= Torrente =

Torrente may refer to:

- Torrent (stream) (Italian: torrente), a stream or fairly small river with a markedly high seasonal variation in its flow
- Torrente (fashion house), a Parisian haute couture fashion house; current creative director Julien Fournié
- "El Torrente", a song by Minus the Bear from the 2005 album Menos el Oso
- Torrente (music), a harmonic and rhythmic pattern in traditional Panamanian music
- Torrente de Cinca, a municipality located in the province of Huesca, Aragon, Spain
- Torrent, Valencia, a municipality located in the province of Valencia, Spain

== People ==
- Dario Torrente (born 1966), South African fencer
- Gaspar Torrente (1888–1970), Aragonese nationalist
- Gonzalo Torrente Ballester (1910–1999), Spanish novelist
- Gonzalo Torrente Malvido (1935–2011), Spanish novelist and screenwriter
- Javier Torrente (born 1969), Argentine football manager
- Manuel Torrente (fl. 1908–1948), Argentine fencer

== Cinema and television ==
- Torrente (franchise), Spanish media franchise created by Santiago Segura
  - Torrente, el brazo tonto de la ley, 1998 Spanish film
  - Torrente 2: Misión en Marbella, 2001 Spanish film
  - Torrente 3: El protector, 2005 Spanish film
  - Torrente 4: Lethal Crisis, 2011 Spanish film
  - Torrente 5: Operación Eurovegas, 2014 Spanish film
  - Torrente for President, 2026 Spanish film
  - José Luis Torrente, main character in the franchise, performed by Santiago Segura himself
- Torrente (telenovela), a Venezuelan telenovela which aired in 2008

== Video games ==
- Torrente (video game)

== See also ==
- Torrent (disambiguation)
