= Torrente (franchise) =

Spanish dark comedy franchise

- Created by: Santiago Segura
- Original work: Torrente, the Dumb Arm of the Law (1998)
- Years: 1998–present

Print publications
- Graphic novel(s): Torrente y el descubrimiento de América (2013); Torrente y el Cid (2014)

Films and television
- Film(s): Torrente, the Dumb Arm of the Law (1998); Torrente 2: Mission in Marbella (2001); Torrente 3: el protector (2005); Torrente 4: Lethal Crisis (2011); Torrente 5: Operación Eurovegas (2014); Torrente for President (2026)

Games
- Video game(s): Torrente (2003); Torrente 3: The Protector (2005)

Torrente is a Spanish dark comedy-action film franchise created, written, and directed by Santiago Segura. It follows the adventures of José Luis Torrente, a racist, sexist, homophobic, xenophobic, and fascist former police agent, performed by Segura himself. The film series features numerous celebrity cameos.

The first Torrente film released in 1998 became the highest-grossing Spanish film of all time in Spain, later surpassed by its first sequel released in 2001; leading to a third (2005), fourth (2011), fifth (2014), and sixth (2026) films. The franchise has yielded also two video games: Torrente (2003) and Torrente 3: The Protector (2005); two graphic novels by Enric Rebollo: Torrente y el descubrimiento de América (2013) and Torrente y el Cid (2014); and a slot machine.

== Films ==
=== Torrente, the Dumb Arm of the Law (1998) ===
José Luis Torrente is a lazy, rude, drunkard, sexist, racist, right-wing ex-policeman turned fake cop who lives in a decrepit apartment in a slum neighbourhood in Madrid with his father, whose disability checks are Torrente's only real income.

This film released on 13 March 1998 was nominated for three Goya Awards at the 13th Goya Awards, winning two: Santiago Segura the Best New Director award, and Tony Leblanc the Best Supporting Actor award; with Javier Cámara being nominated for Best New Actor. The film became the highest-grossing Spanish film of all time in Spain since box office records began in 1965.

=== Torrente 2: Mission in Marbella (2001) ===
Torrente has moved to Marbella, where, after being wiped out of the money he had gained, he has returned to private investigation.

The film's song "Semos diferentes" by Joaquín Sabina was nominated for the Goya Award for Best Original Song at the 16th Goya Awards. The film released on 30 March 2001 became the highest-grossing Spanish film of all time in Spain, surpassing the first film.

=== Torrente 3: el protector (2005) ===
Torrente became a private bodyguard who has to protect MEP Giannina Ricci, famous for her fight against polluting companies.

The film, released on 30 September 2005, is a parody of the American film The Bodyguard, which was directed by Mick Jackson and starred Kevin Costner and Whitney Houston. The film became the highest-grossing Spanish film of the year in Spain.

=== Torrente 4: Lethal Crisis (2011) ===
Torrente becomes a security guard, but screws up the job, which leads to being wrongfully accused of murder and sent to prison. He tries to break out by organizing a football game between the guards and the inmates, inspired by Escape to Victory.

The film was released on 9 March 2011 in 3D. The film became the highest-grossing film of the year in Spain.

=== Torrente 5: Operación Eurovegas (2014) ===
Released from prison after several years, Torrente decides to rob a casino together with the help of a bunch of incompetent people.

The film, released on 3 October 2014, is a parody of heist films, especially the Ocean's franchise, and was inspired in the failed Eurovegas hotel-casino project. Antonio Molina and Ferran Piquer were nominated for the Goya Award for Best Special Effects at the 29th Goya Awards.

=== Torrente for President (2026) ===
Torrente bids for president of the government of Spain.

The film was released on 13 March 2026.

== Video games ==
=== Torrente (2003) ===
Torrente is a 2003 video game from O~3 Entertainment. It is based on the first two films.

=== Torrente 3: The Protector (2005) ===
Torrente 3: The Protector is a 2005 video game based in the third film.

== Graphic novels ==
The franchise has yielded two original graphic novels by Enric Rebollo: Torrente y el descubrimiento de América (2013) and Torrente y el Cid (2014).

The third film in the franchise, Torrente 3: el protector, was also adapted in 2005 into a comic of the same name by Mónica & Beatriz.

== Cast and characters ==
List indicators

This section includes characters who have appeared in as the main characters in the franchise.

- An empty grey cell indicates the character was not in the film.
- ^{V} indicates a voice-only role.
- ^{Y} indicates a younger version of the character.

Characters	Films						Video games	
Characters	Torrente, the Dumb Arm of the Law	Torrente 2: Mission in Marbella	Torrente 3: el protector	Torrente 4: Lethal Crisis	Torrente 5: Operación Eurovegas	Torrente for President	Torrente	Torrente 3: The Protector
Characters	1998	2001	2005	2011	2014	2026	2003	2005
José Luis Torrente	Santiago Segura	Santiago Segura	Santiago Segura Eduardo García^{Y}	Santiago Segura	Santiago Segura	Santiago Segura	Santiago Segura^{V}	Santiago Segura^{V}
Rafael "Rafi" Jiménez Valera	Javier Cámara					Javier Cámara		
Amparito	Neus Asensi				Neus Asensi	Neus Asensi		
Spinelli	José Luis Moreno					José Luis Moreno		
Felipe Torrente	Tony Leblanc							
Antoñito	Cañita Brava		Cañita Brava	Cañita Brava	Cañita Brava	Cañita Brava		
Cuco		Gabino Diego			Julián López	Gabino Diego		
Mauricio Torrente		Tony Leblanc	Tony Leblanc					
Manolito Barragán		Señor Barragán	Señor Barragán	Señor Barragán	Señor Barragán	Señor Barragán		
Josito			José Mota					
Juan Francisco Solís			Javier Gutiérrez	Javier Gutiérrez		Javier Gutiérrez^{V}		
Pepito Torrente			Carlos Latre					
Julito "Rinrín"				Kiko Rivera		Kiko Rivera		
Gregorio Torrente				Tony Leblanc				
Cuadrado				Fernando Esteso	Fernando Esteso	Fernando Esteso		
Jesusín					Jesulín de Ubrique	Jesulín de Ubrique		
John Marshall					Alec Baldwin			

=== Cameos ===
The film series features numerous cameos from celebrities, such as: Javier Bardem, Jorge Sanz, Carlos Moyá, Diego el Cigala, John Landis, Oliver Stone, Guillermo del Toro, Iker Casillas, Fernando Torres, Belén Esteban, Gonzalo Higuaín, Sergio Agüero, Cesc Fàbregas, and Sergio Ramos.

== Accolades ==
Torrente film series at the Goya Awards
Category
Category	13th Goya Awards	16th Goya Awards	29th Goya Awards
Category	Torrente, the Dumb Arm of the Law	Torrente 2: Mission in Marbella	Torrente 5: Operación Eurovegas
New Director	Won (Note: Laureate: Santiago Segura.)		
Best Supporting Actor	Won (Note: Laureate: Tony Leblanc as Felipe Torrente.)		
Best New Actor	Nominated (Note: Nominee: Javier Cámara as Rafael "Rafi" Jiménez Valera.)		
Best Original Song		Nominated (Note: Nominee: "Semos diferentes" by Joaquín Sabina.)	
Best Special Effects			Nominated (Note: Nominee: Antonio Molina and Ferran Piquer.)
