= Torrente for President =

- Theatrical release poster
- Spanish: Torrente, presidente
- Directed by: Santiago Segura
- Written by: Santiago Segura
- Starring: Santiago Segura; Gabino Diego; Omar Montes; Manuel Barragán; Cañita Brava; Ramón Langa; Willy Bárcenas; Carlos Areces; David Guapo; Francisco Nicolás; Susi Caramelo
- Cinematography: Javier Salmones
- Edited by: Fran Amaro
- Music by: Roque Baños
- Production companies: Torrente Presidente AIE; Bowfinger International Pictures; Amiguetes Enterprises
- Distributed by: Sony Pictures Releasing International
- Release date: 13 March 2026
- Running time: 102 minutes
- Country: Spain
- Language: Spanish
- Box office: €28 million

Torrente for President (Spanish: Torrente, presidente) is a 2026 Spanish comedy film directed by Santiago Segura, starring Segura as José Luis Torrente. A satire of Spain's politics, it is the sixth installment of the Torrente film series, following Torrente 5: Operación Eurovegas (2014). Similarly to other films by Segura, the film features a long list of cameos as easter eggs.

It was released theatrically in Spain on 13 March 2026 by Sony Pictures, posting successful box office figures in the country and becoming the highest-grossing entry in the Torrente film series.

== Plot ==
Racist, sexist and homophobic José Luis Torrente makes a comeback, this time preparing a bid for the office of president of the Government of Spain.

== Cast ==
- Santiago Segura as José Luis Torrente
- Gabino Diego as Cuco
- Carlos Areces as Pelayo
- Ramón Langa as Jacobo Carrascal
- Bertín Osborne as Pedro Vilches
- Cañita Brava as Antoñito
- Vito Quiles as himself
- Alec Baldwin as Donald Trump
- Kevin Spacey as the man pulling the strings
- José María Kimbo as Bartolomé
- Carlos Latre as Javier Milei
- Aníbal Gómez as Idoia Mantero
- Florentino Fernández as Patxi

== Production ==
The film was produced by Torrente Presidente AIE, Bowfinger International Pictures, and Amiguetes Enterprises and it had the participation of Netflix and Atresmedia and the association of Mogambo. Filming began in 2025. Shooting locations included the small municipality of Anchuelo and a bar in the Ciudad Lineal district of Madrid decorated with far-right paraphernalia. In order to avoid scrutiny, the production crew shot footage in Madrid under the cover title Los años que me quedan. Atresmedia Cine announced a wide collaboration agreement with Bowfinger International Pictures at the 73rd San Sebastián International Film Festival including the film.

== Release ==
Distributed by Sony Pictures, the film was released theatrically in Spain on 13 March 2026. Film Factory acquired international sales rights. It went on to gross an estimated €2.4 million (circa 300,000 admissions) in its opening Friday, and around €7.25 in its opening weekend. The film used a non-standard marketing strategy, with no details about the cast disclosed prior to the theatrical release, while the first trailer was released after the opening weekend. Also on 16 March 2026, Sony released the poster and first stills from the film. After ten days, it had grossed over €16 million (2 million admissions), becoming the highest-grossing film of 2026 in Spain. After its third weekend, it had grossed €20.6 million. After its fifth weekend, it had grossed €26.4 million (3.5 million admissions). With over €28 million in takings and close to 3.8 million admissions by its tenth weekend in Spanish theatres, it had become the fourth highest grossing Spanish film in the domestic box office and the highest-grossing title of the Torrente film series (although not the Torrente film with more admissions, which still is Torrente 2). It was released theatrically in Argentina on 9 April 2026 by Méliès Distribution Company.

== Reception ==
Manuel J. Lombardo of Diario de Sevilla gave the film a 1-star rating declaring it a "a radio comedy with very little humour".

Fausto Fernández of Fotogramas rated the film 4 out of 5 stars, deeming it to be the best political film in Spain since Selfie.

Marta Medina del Valle of El Confidencial rated the film 2½ out of 5 stars, somewhat missing in the film the bold cinema of the first Torrente.

Rubén Romero Santos of Cinemanía rated the film 3½ out of 5 stars, declaring it Segura's most "Ozorian" work, likening it to ¡Que vienen los socialistas!, otherwise pointing out that in the satire Vox and surrounding people receive the most scathing treatment, followed by the PSOE and then by Sumar and Podemos, while the PP barely receives little pinches.

Natalia Trzenko of La Nación rated the film 3 out of 5 stars ('good'), assessing that the comedy works and unfolds non-stop "without any political correctness, subtleties, or constraints imposed by good taste".

== See also ==
- List of Spanish films of 2026
