= Silvia Abril =

Spanish actress and comedian

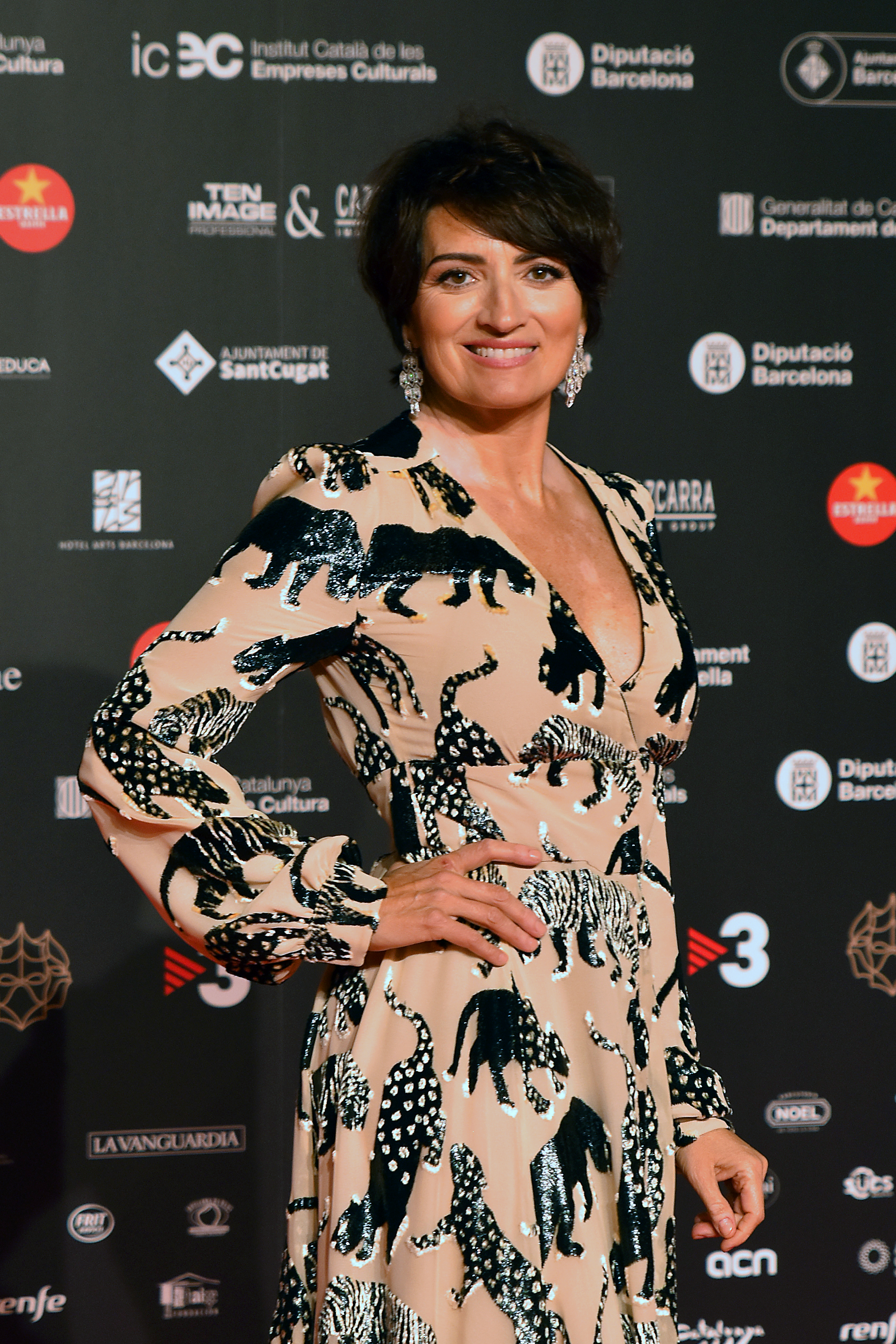
- Abril at the 14th Gaudí Awards in 2022
- Born: Silvia Abril Fernández; 10 April 1971 (age 55); Mataró, Spain
- Education: Institut del Teatre
- Years active: 2003–present
- Spouse: Andreu Buenafuente (m. 2007)
- Children: 1

Silvia Abril Fernández (born 10 April 1971) is a Spanish comedian, actress and TV host from Catalonia.

== Biography ==
Abril was born in Mataró, Barcelona, and she has three sisters: Meritxell (1986), Mónica (1973) and Anabel. She is married to comedian Andreu Buenafuente, and their child, Joana, was born on 28 November 2012.

== Career ==
She is best known for her roles in hit Spanish series La que se avecina as Violeta Recio, Spanish Movie as Laura, and as one of the dancers for the Spanish entry at the Eurovision Song Contest 2008, "Baila el Chiki-chiki".

On 19 September 2017 she participated at the second season of MasterChef Celebrity with Bibiana Fernández, Pepón Nieto, Marina San José, Anabel Alonso, Patricia Montero, Edu Soto, José Corbacho, Usun Yoon, Juan Betancourt, Saúl Craviotto and Carlos Baute. She was the fourth contestant eliminated, but she was brought back in the next episode, and she finally was the runner-up.

Abril is the panelist of the television show Cero en Historia alongside Raúl Cimas, Sara Escudero and J.J. Vaquero, which is presented by Joaquín Reyes. In the season 3 episode 14 Silvia Abril was replaced by Anabel Alonso due to health problems. He was replaced by Patricia Conde in the fourth season.

She hosted the 33rd Goya Awards with Andreu Buenafuente on 2 February 2019. She appeared in the comedy film Bajo el mismo techo (2019), starring with Jordi Sánchez.

== Filmography ==
=== Film ===
- 2019: Padre no hay más que uno
- 2019: Bajo el mismo techo
- 2016: Cuerpo de élite
- 2016: Un corazón roto no es como un jarrón roto o un florero
- 2015: Anacleto: agente secreto
- 2015: Vulcania
- 2014: El culo del mundo
- 2014: Torrente 5: Operación Eurovegas
- 2013: Three Many Weddings
- 2012: Ghost Graduation
- 2011: Torrente 4: Lethal Crisis
- 2010: Toy Story 3 (Spain voice acting)
- 2009: Spanish Movie
- 2006: El Juglar da la nota
- 2005: Torrente 3: El protector
- 2003: Lo mejor que le puede pasar a un cruasán
- 2003: ¡Buen viaje, excelencia!

=== Television ===
- 2026: Mask Singer: Adivina quién canta
- 2025: La agencia
- 2025: La casa nostra
- 2025–present: Futuro imperfecto
- 2025: Vintage
- 2025: Atasco
- 2024: Mamen Mayo
- 2023: Todas las veces que nos enamoramos
- 2022: El gran sarao
- 2022: LOL: Si te ríes, pierdes
- 2022: Señor, dame paciencia
- 2020: Entre ovejas
- 2020: 34th Goya Awards
- 2019: Juego de juegos
- 2019: 33rd Goya Awards
- 2018: La noche de Rober
- 2017: Hipnotízame
- 2017: MasterChef Celebrity (contestant)
- 2017–present: Cero en Historia
- 2017: Tú sí que sí
- 2016–present: Late Motiv
- 2016: 3rd award ceremony of Premios Feroz
- 2016: ¡Eso lo hago yo!
- 2015 – 2016: Tu cara me suena
- 2014: 39+1
- 2013: Oh Happy Day!
- 2013: En el aire
- 2013 – 2015: Me resbala
- 2008 & 2011–2014: La que se avecina
- 2012: Buenas noches y Buenafuente
- 2011: Palomitas
- 2011: El Hormiguero
- 2011: Las noticias de las 2
- 2010: La escobilla nacional
- 2010: Caiga Quien Caiga
- 2010: Pelotas
- 2008: Eurovision Song Contest 2008
- 2008 – 2009: Buenafuente
- 2006: Divinos
- 2004 – 2005: Las cerezas
- 2003 – 2007, 2017–present: Homo Zapping
