= Little Red Riding Wolf =

- Theatrical release poster
- De Caperucita a loba
- Directed by: Chus Gutiérrez
- Screenplay by: Marta González de Vega
- Based on: De Caperucita a loba by Marta González de Vega
- Produced by: Álvaro Ariza Tirado
- Starring: Marta González de Vega
- Cinematography: Pilar Sánchez Díaz
- Edited by: Julia Juániz
- Music by: Karin Zielinski
- Production companies: Bowfinger International Pictures; De Caperucita a loba AIE; Esto También Pasará; Tondero Producciones
- Distributed by: A contracorriente Films (Spain); Latido (International)
- Release dates: March 14, 2023 (Málaga); April 5, 2023 (Spain); April 6, 2023 (Peru)
- Running time: 92 minutes
- Countries: Spain; Peru
- Language: Spanish
- Box office: €127.570

Little Red Riding Wolf (Spanish: De Caperucita a loba, lit. 'From Little Red Riding Hood to Wolf') is a 2023 comedy film directed by Chus Gutiérrez from a screenplay written by Marta González de Vega who also starred in the feature. It is based on the book and play of the same name by González de Vega. The rest of the cast is made up of Berto Romero, David Guapo, José Mota, Antonio Resines, Elena Irureta, Melania Urbina and Marco Zunino.

== Synopsis ==
Marta manages to go from Little Red Riding Hood to wolf when she decides to use every pathetic situation that love puts her in to learn to laugh at herself harder than anyone else. Entering the forest of drama, she will become the protagonist of her own comedy when she discovers that laughter springs from drama and from laughter, power!

== Cast ==
- Marta González de Vega as Marta
- Martita de Graná as Carolina
- Melania Urbina as Ana
- David Guapo as Javier
- Marco Zunino as Pedro
- José Mota as Alberto
- Berto Romero as Germán
- Agustín Jiménez as Antonio / Boss
- Javier Veiga as Fernando
- Antonio Resines as Ramiro
- Elena Irureta as Rosa
- Patricia García Méndez as Surgeon
- Santiago Segura as Pharmacist
- Rober Bodegas as Disco Boy 1
- Alberto Casado as Disco Boy 2
- Josele Román as Old Woman
- Arturo González-Campos as Chinese Restaurant Taxi Driver
- Charo Reina as Bus Driver
- Dara Bastida as 5 year-old-girl
- Eric Francés as Garbage Collector
- Alba Gutiérrez as Streetlight Girl
- Héctor Montoliu as Delivery Man
- Juan de Vera as Rosales Painter Taxi Driver

== Production ==
Principal photography began in early October 2022 in Madrid, Spain.

== Release ==
Little Red Riding Wolf had its world premiere on March 14, 2023, at the 26th Málaga Film Festival. It was commercially released on April 5, 2023, in Spanish theaters and the next day it was released in Peruvian theaters.
