= Carlos Latre =

Spanish comedian and celebrity impersonator

- Latre impersonating Steve Jobs in 2015.
- Born: Carlos Latre Ruiz; 30 January 1979 (age 47); Castellón de la Plana, Spain
- Occupations: Comedian; TV presenter Impressionist
- Years active: 1999–present
- Height: 1.70 m (5 ft 7 in)
- Spouse(s): Yolanda Marcos (2004–2015, 2017–present)
- Children: 1
- Awards: Micrófono de Oro (2004)
- Website: www.carloslatre.com

Carlos Latre Ruiz (born 30 January 1979) is a Spanish comedian, TV presenter and impressionist. He is particularly known for his television impressions and for being a judge on talent show Tu cara me suena on Antena 3.

== Education ==
Latre was born and raised in Castelló de la Plana but completed his secondary studies at the Institut Martí Franqués in Tarragona.

== Personal life ==
The impressionist has been married to Yolanda Marcos since 2004, although they separated in 2015 and resumed their relationship in 2017. They have a daughter together named Candela.

== Professional career ==
He started as a radio presenter on Cadena SER, on the program Los 40 Principales, and on Cadena Dial. On television, he began his participation in 1999 on the program Xou com sou on the channel TV3.

He became well known for his impersonations on the late-night show Crónicas marcianas on Telecinco of various characters, such as La Pitonisa Lola, Torrente, Juan Carlos I, or Cayetana de Alba.

Later, he started his own show on Telecinco, Latrelevisión, with modest audience success. After its cancellation, he moved to the channel Cuatro.

He has also worked as a voice actor in films like Garfield, Happily N'Ever After, and The Jungle Book 2.

He was awarded the Micrófono de Oro in 2004 by the Federación de Asociaciones de Radio y Televisión.

In April 2007, accompanied by a cast of nine other impersonators, he returned to Telecinco with the show Réplica, a comedy space of parodies. The program was removed after three broadcasts, which garnered an average audience share of 14.3%, below the network's average of 19%.

Since September 2008, he has also participated in the program Crackòvia on TV3, a satirical show that, following the formula of Polònia, parodies current sports events.

From 2004 to 2015, he collaborated weekly with Carlos Herrera on his program Herrera en la Onda, on Onda Cero.

He was the pregonero of the Carthaginians and Romans festival in Cartagena in 2010.

In 2011, he toured Spain with Yes, We Spain Is Different, a theater piece in which he reflects on Spain's situation in the world through the imitation of over a hundred characters, including both celebrities and international political figures.

On Antena 3, he has collaborated as an impersonator on DEC and La escobilla nacional.

The character he portrayed of the former FC Barcelona president Núñez was used for one of the famous "memes" called "It's Free". In 2011, he became a judge on the imitation and singing contest Tu cara me suena. In 2012, he began recording Señoras que... with Josema Yuste, David Fernández, and Jordi Ríos, a sitcom that aired from 2012 to 2013 on the television channel Neox. In the same year, he returned as a judge in the second edition of Tu cara me suena and in the third edition.

From May 2013 to June 2013, he hosted the game show Letris on La 1.

From October 2013 to December 2013, he returned again to La 1 where he hosted the program Uno de los nuestros.

Since November 2013, he has collaborated with Florentino Fernández, Miki Nadal, Toni Acosta, Edu Soto, and many more on the comedy contest Me resbala (Antena 3), presented by Arturo Valls.

Since April 2015, he has collaborated on Thursdays, as on Herrera en la Onda, with Juan Ramón Lucas on the program Más de uno, on Onda Cero. In addition, in 2016, he appeared as an interviewee in the documentary No es cosa de risa, a compilation of interviews about the ins and outs of show business.

On 22 July 2017, he presented the 4th edition of the Premios Platino along with Uruguayan actress and singer Natalia Oreiro.

In 2018, he was the pregonero of the Carnaval de Badajoz. On Friday, 16 November 2018, he premiered the program Surtido de ibéricos on Onda Cero.

He hosted several concerts of Love90, 2019 and 2020. He has performed as a comic artist, impersonating and singing in One Show Man, in various locations in Spain, 2021-2022-2023 and in theatrical event at Golfus de Roma in 2021 - 2022.

In 2024, he left Tu cara me suena in a well-publicised return to Telecinco, to host his own access primetime entertainment show. The result, Babylon Show, was launched to great fanfare, including Luis de la Fuente, whose Spain side had just won UEFA Euro 2024, as its first guest, however it was axed after just eleven episodes due to poor ratings.

In 2025, Latre joined the revival of Telecinco's daytime chat show El programa de Ana Rosa as a collaborator. In 2026, he returned to Antena 3, taking up his original role as an impressionist on El Hormiguero.

== Television programs ==
Year	Television program	Channel	Notes
1999	Xou com sou	TV3	
2002–2005	Crónicas marcianas	Telecinco	Collaborator
2003–2005	Latrelevisión	Telecinco	
2005–2006	Maracaná	Cuatro	
2006	Channel nº4	Cuatro	
2006	El mundo de Chema	Cuatro	Series
2007–2012	Polònia	TV3	
2008	Réplica	Telecinco	
2008–2012	Crackòvia	TV3	
2009	La tribu	Telecinco	
2009–2024, 2026–present	El Hormiguero	Cuatro, Antena 3	Guest, collaborator
2010	La escobilla nacional	Antena 3	
2011–2024	Tu cara me suena	Antena 3	Judge
2012	Menuda Noche	Canal Sur TV	Guest
2012	Christmas Eve Special: Canta conmigo	La 1	
2012	New Year's Eve Special: Hotel 13 estrellas, 12 uvas	La 1	
2012–2013	Señoras que...	Neox	
2013	Letris	La 1	Host
2013	Uno de los nuestros	La 1	
2013–2021	Me resbala	Antena 3	
2014	Tu cara me suena Mini	Antena 3	
2015	Un, Dos, ¡Chef!	Disney Channel España	Guest
2016	Boca-Zás!	Disney Channel España	
2017	Mi casa es la tuya	Telecinco	
2019	The World's Best	CBS	
2020	Improvisando	Antena 3	
2020	Typical Spanish	La 1	Contributor
2020	MasterChef Celebrity	La 1	Guest
2020	El juego de los anillos	Antena 3	Contestant
2021	¿Quién quiere ser millonario?	Antena 3	Contestant
2024	Babylon Show	Telecinco	Presenter
2025–2026	El Programa de Ana Rosa	Telecinco	Collaborator

== Radio programs ==
- 2015: Herrera en la onda (Onda Cero)
- 2015–present: Más de uno (Onda Cero)
- 2018-2019: Surtido de ibéricos (Onda Cero / Melodía FM Estéreo)

== Filmography ==
Actor

Year	Film	Character	Director	Genre	Duration
2003	El oro de Moscú	Ricky Tajuña	Jesús Bonilla	Comedy	1h 48m
2005	Torrente 3: El protector	José "Pepito" Torrente	Santiago Segura	Comedy	1h 37m
2016	No es cosa de risa	Interviewee	Diego Fortea and Jonathan Belles	Comedy/Documentary	28m
2026	Torrente for President	Javier Milei	Santiago Segura	Comedy	1h 43m

Voice actor

Year	Title	Character	Original Actor
2003	Mortadelo & Filemon: The Big Adventure	Mortadelo	Benito Pocino
2003	The Jungle Book 2	Buzzie	Jeff Bennett, Brian Cummings, Baron Davis, Jess Harnell and Phil Collins
2003	El Cid: The Legend	Ben Yussuf / Count Ordoñez	
2004	Pinocchio 3000	Spencer	Howie Mandel
2004	Garfield: The Movie	Garfield	Bill Murray
2005	Happily N'Ever After	Munk	Andy Dick
2006	Garfield: A Tail of Two Kitties	Garfield	Bill Murray
2006	Hoodwinked!	Wolf W. Wolf	Patrick Warburton
2006	Happy Feet	Ramón / Lovelace	Robin Williams
2008	Asterix at the Olympic Games	Buentórax	Guillaume Gallienne
2011	Happy Feet Two	Ramón / Lovelace	Robin Williams
2011	Justin and the Knights of Valour	Brafán	Freddie Highmore
2016	Robinson: A Musical Adventure	Mak / Tuesday	Kaya Yanar
2017	The Emoji Movie	Fist Bump	James Corden
2018	The Queen's Corgi	Camembert	Jack Whitehall
2022	Paws of Fury: The Legend of Hank	Ika Chu	Ricky Gervais
2024	IF	Blue	Steve Carell

== Theater ==
- Yes, We Spain Is Different (2011)
- Golfus de Roma (2021–2022)
- One Show Man (2021–2023)

== Awards and nominations ==
Year	Category	Award	Result
2004	Best comic revelation	Micrófono de Oro	Won
2015	Best actor	Premio de la Unión de Actores	Nominated
2016	Best actor	Premio de la Unión de Actores	Nominated
