= Andreu Buenafuente =

Spanish television host and comedian

- Buenafuente in 2026
- Born: Andreu Buenafuente Moreno; 24 January 1965 (age 61); Reus, Spain
- Spouse: Silvia Abril (m. 2007)
- Children: 1

Comedy career
- Years active: 1982–present
- Medium: Television
- Genres: Improvisational comedy; observational comedy; satire
- Subject: Everyday life

Andreu Buenafuente Moreno (born 24 January 1965) is a Spanish late night show host and founder of the group El Terrat. He has worked in TV3, Antena 3, laSexta and #0. He has also worked as a radio host and has published several books with his monologues.

He and Silvia Abril hosted the 33rd Goya Awards on 2 February 2019.

== Biography ==
He was born in Reus (Catalonia), to Juan Buenafuente and Teresa Moreno. His father was native to that area and the son of parents from the Zurgena area of Almería. He was a representative, a player at the Reus Deportiu Football Club and amateur actor. His mother, Teresa Moreno, was born in Lorca (Murcia), although her family was from Almería, and worked in the textile industry.

=== Radio ===
He began working in the sports division of Radio Popular Reus (COPE) at 17 (1982) and seven years later he presented the programme El terrat (SER Catalunya), for which he won the Onda Award for Best Local Radio Programme in 1997. In order to be able to contract his own collaborators, he founded El Terrat, a company dedicated to 'television, radio and digital production'. In the summer of 2002 he presented on La isla de los mosquitos (Cadena SER), a programme in which witty phrases were mixed with music. Eleven years later, on Sunday 30 June 2013, he returned to Cadena SER with his friend and coworker Berto Romero with the programme Nadie sabe nada, which would go on to win other Onda Awards in 2019.

=== Television ===
His first television appearances were in 1992 under the direction of Mikimoto on Persones humanes (TV3), of Arús on Al ataque (Antena 3) and of Sardà on Tot per l'audiència (TV3). He established himself in on Catalan public broadcasting with programmes like Sense Títol (1995), Sense Titol 2 (1996), Sense Titol, Sense Vacances (1997) and Sense Titol S/N (1998), which were all produced by El Terrat and directed by Andreu in collaboration with others in his team. The most successful programmes on the channel were the late show La cosa nostra (1999–2000), and Una altra cosa (2002–2004). In June 2004 the latter programme ended and he accepted Antena 3's offer to work in national broadcasting, on similar projects to Una altra cosa. Also, his production company released other successful shows on TV3, like Malalts de tele (1997), Plats bruts (1998), A pèl (2002) and Set de nit.

On 11 January 2005 he launched the late-night talk show Buenafuente (Antena 3), which was broadcast from Tuesday to Thursday, with viewership which exceeded expectations in its first months and for which he received a Onda Award for best entertainment programme in 2006. The legendary appearance of the character el Neng de Castefa (played by Edu Soto) was a notable part of the show. After two years, it was renewed for one more, but a clear decline in viewership mean that the final episode was aired on 28 June 2007.

Ten days before this it was announced that the show would move to La Sexta, keeping the same name and format. This new show was first aired on 17 September 2007 at midnight and in a few months the character of Rodolfo Chikilicuatre (played by David Fernández Ortiz), who originated on the show, would represent Spain in Eurovision with the song Baila el Chiki-Chiki, which came sixteenth, receiving 55 points. Buenafuente was still working with members of the team of actors and screenwriters that he had begun working with at TV3, which was led by Jordi Évole among others, and to which was added new comedians like Berto Romero.

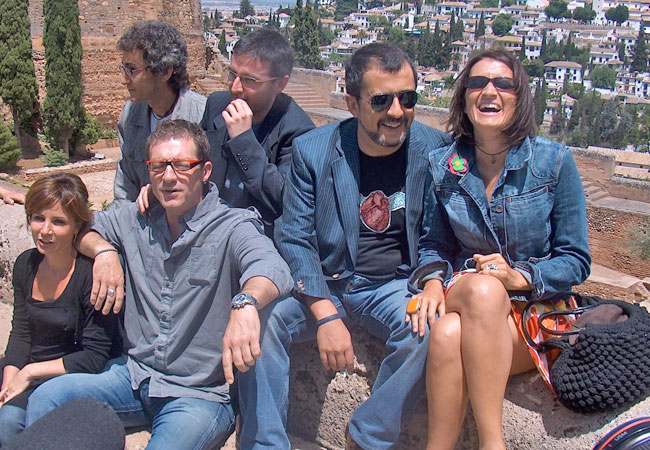
The Buenafuente programme team at the Alhambra, Granada, in 2007.

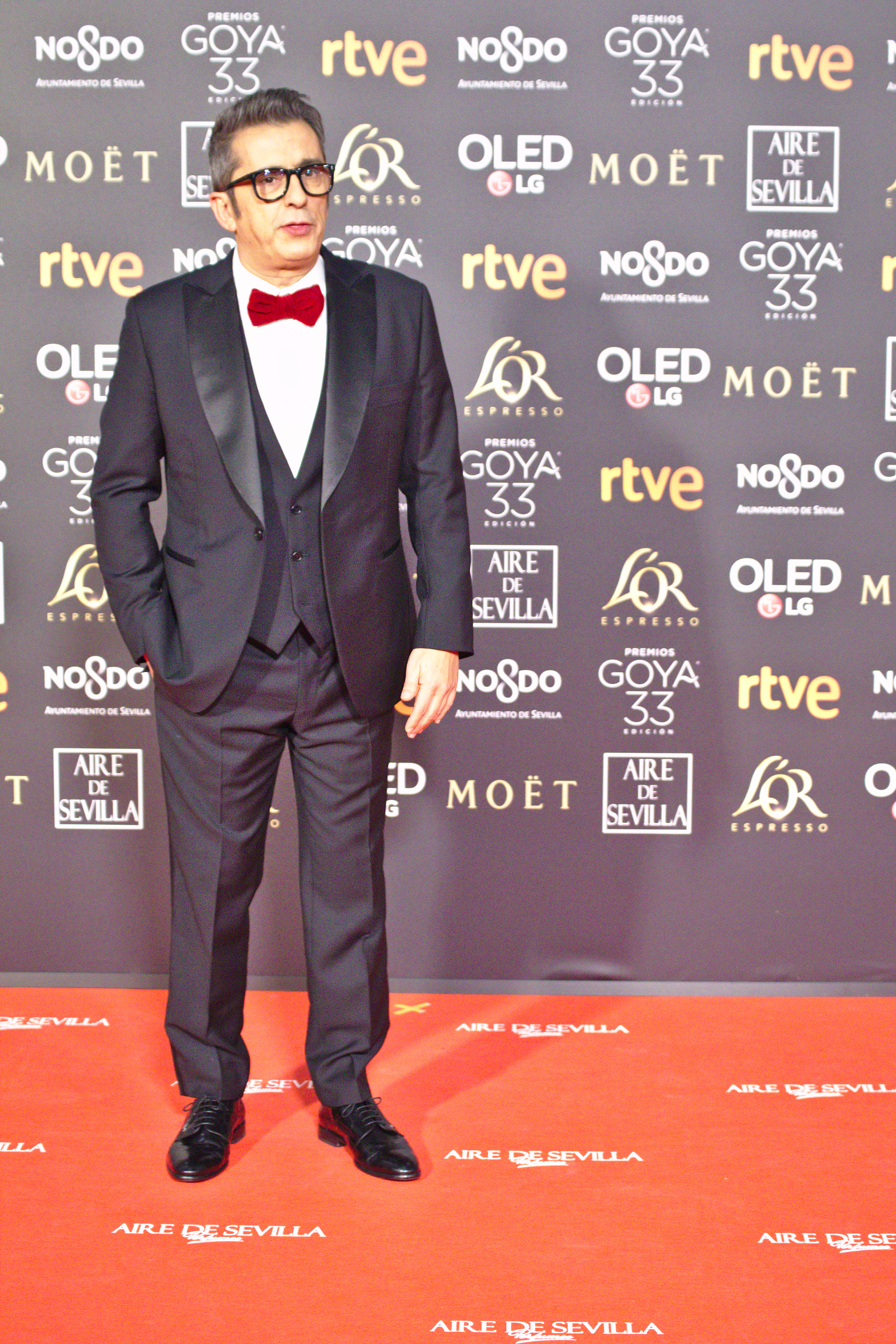
Buenafuente at the Goya Awards in 2019

On 3 December 2009 he went to Madrid to host El intermedio for a day, swapping hosting responsibilities with El Gran Wyoming. On 24 March 2010 Buenafuente aired an innovative episode of his daily show, playing an episode in reverse, 'Etneufaneub'. Also, he hosted the 2010 and 2011 Goya Awards live for La 1 at the Teatro Real in Madrid and collaborated on the series Pelotas. On 30 June 2011 Buenafuente aired for the last time on La Sexta after 964 episodes over the course of four years.

In November 2011 he returned to TV3 to host the two-episode programme Com va la vida? alongside the popular scientist Eduard Punset, on which they reflected on life and science with a humorous tone. This programme was Buenafuente's return to the channel on which he had debuted and at which he had worked for more than ten years.

On 15 April 2012 the programme Buenas noches y Buenafuente (Antena 3) was broadcast, it would air on Sundays in the prime time slot. One month later it was cancelled due to the decline in viewership after just five episodes.

In November 2013, wanting a change, he returned to the world of late-night programming on La Sexta with the show En el aire.

In September 2015 it was confirmed that he would be joining Movistar+, leaving the Atresmedia group and ending En el aire.

On 11 January 2016 the late-night talk show Late motiv was first aired on Canal+ with Pedro Almodóvar as the guest. After 1 February, with the dissolution of Canal+, the programme moved to the new Movistar+ channel #0. This programme was Buenafuente's attempt to return to traditional late-night programming, with a live band and a commitment to live music. The appearance of contributors was also reduced, in order to give the appearance of it being more of a 'one man show'. Some regular contributors did still appear, such as Berto Romero and Javier Coronas, as well as other names like his partner Silvia Abril, David Broncano and the antirreportero (anti-reporter) Llimoo.

After the end of Late motiv, he returned to TV3 and began to release comedy specials that marked the end of each year. They aired on 26 December, Saint Stephen's Day. In 2022 the show was called Curraràs, in 2023 Que us bombin a tots, and in 2024 it was El 24. On the channel, Vosaltres mateixos was also first aired at the end of 2023, where Buenafuente talks to anonymous members of the public.

In January 2025 his contract with RTVE to create a programme for the Friday night slot called Futuro Imperfecto was announced. The show's format is that of a comedy special, with a long monologue, although it also includes brief interludes which feature regular contributors or members of the public.

== Personal life ==
His sister, Maite Buenafuente, is an actress and was also one of the founders of the production company El Terrat, where she worked as the casting director. In 2010 Andreu Buenafuente publicly announced his relationship with the actress and comedian Silvia Abril. In 2012 the couple had a daughter, Joana.

In defence of his right to privacy, Buenafuente has sued various gossip magazines. In 2011 the Supreme Court of Spain ordered the magazine Diez Minutos to pay him €48,000 for publishing photos of him with his then partner without permission. That same year the Supreme Court affirmed the sentence that ordered the magazine Sorpresa to pay him €55,000 in compensation for publishing, between 2004 and 2006, stories about his private life, among them photos in which he was naked at the beach. In both suits, Buenafuente donated the money he received to various NGOs.

In November 2025, it was announced that Buenafuente would take a break from television for mental health reasons, suspending his show Futuro imperfecto, however he would aim to return for the New Year bells that he had planned to host on TVE. Later in December, Buenafuente and his wife Silvia Abril announced that Buenafuente would not recover in time for the bells, and they were replaced by Chenoa and Estopa.

== Media appearances ==
=== Television series ===
Year	Title	Channel	Notes
1992-1993	Al ataque	Antena 3	Contributor
1993	Persones humanes	TV3	Contributor
1994	Tot per l'audiencia	TV3	Contributor
1995	Sense títol amb Andreu Buenafuente	TV3	Host
1996	Sense títol 2	TV3	Host
1997	Sense títol, sense vacances	TV3	Host
1997	Malalts de tele	TV3	Creator
1998	Sense Titol S/N	TV3	Host
1999	Plats bruts	TV3	
2002-2004	Una altra cosa	TV3	Host
2005-2011	Buenafuente	Antena 3 La Sexta	Host
2009	El intermedio	La Sexta	Substitute host
2011	Com va la vida?	TV3	Host
2012	Buenas noches y Buenafuente	Antena 3	Host
2013-2015	En el aire	La Sexta	Host
2016-2021	Late motiv	Canal+/#0	Host
2022	Nadie sabe nada	HBO Max	Host
2023–present	Vosaltres mateixos	TV3	Host
2023–present	El monòleg de l'any	TV3	Host
2025–present	Futuro imperfecto	La 1	Host

==== Other television appearances ====
Year	Series	Channel	Character	Notes
1999	Plats bruts	TV3	Himself	1 episode
2006	Homo Zapping	Antena 3	Zacarías Prats	1 episode
2009	Pelotas	La 1	Cura	1 episode
2010	Més dinamita	TV3		1 episode
2017	El fin de la comedia	Comedy Central	Himself	1 episode
2019-2020	Mira lo que has hecho	Movistar+	Himself	2 episodes
2022	El gran sarao	TNT	Himself	1 episode
2023	El otro lado	Movistar+	Doctor Estrada	6 episodes
2024	Medina: El estafador de famosos	Prime Video	Himself	3 episodes

=== Film ===
He has appeared in a variety of films as a secondary character. Also, in 2014 he directed and produced his first documentary film. Furthermore, he was done voice acting for the dubbed versions of several animated films.

Year	Title	Director	Role
1998	Torrente, el brazo tonto de la ley (Torrente, the Dumb Arm of the Law)	Santiago Segura	Sunday driver
2001	Torrente 2: Misión en Marbella (Torrente 2: Mission in Marbella)	Santiago Segura	Sunday driver
2003	Lo mejor que le puede pasar a un cruasán (The Best Thing That Can Happen to a Croissant)	Paco Mir	Andreu B.
2005	Torrente 3: El protector	Santiago Segura	Sunday driver
2007	Donkey Xote	José Pozo	Sancho Panza (voice)
2008	Hellboy 2: el ejército dorado	Guillermo del Toro	Jeffrey Tambor (voice)
2009	Spanish Movie	Javier Ruiz Caldera	Gnome
2011	Torrente 4: Lethal Crisis	Santiago Segura	Sunday driver
2014	Torrente 5: Operación Eurovegas	Santiago Segura	Sunday driver
2014	El culo del mundo	Andreu Buenafuente	Himself
2015	Anacleto: Agente secreto (Spy Time)	Javier Ruiz Caldera	Senior agent
2016	El pregón	Dani de la Orden	Juan
2016	Un corazón roto no es como un jarrón roto o un florero	Isabel Coixet	Doctor
2018	Tiempo después (Some Time Later)	José Luis Cuerda	Hortensio Zumalacárregui

=== Theatre ===
He has directed various plays. Furthermore, in Terrat Pack he toured throughout Spain .

- Ustedes se preguntarán cómo he llegado hasta aquí, with Santi Millán and Paz Padilla (2001).
- 20 anys i una nit, with Nina (2003).
- Sotinho, with Edu Soto (2004).
- Garrik, in Tricicle (contributor) (2007).
- Terrat Pack, with Jordi Évole, Berto and José Corbacho (2008, 2009 and 2011).
- Verás que todo es mentira, with Berto (2009).
- Nadie sabe nada, with Gomaespuma (2013).
- Espain, with la Shica (2013).

=== Ad campaigns ===
- "Nintendo 3DS Mario Kart 7" - alongside Berto Romero and David Bustamante (2011)
- "Nintendo 3DS" (2011)
- "Vodafone"
- "Toyota"
- “Iphone 6” alongside Berto Romero (2014)

== Awards ==
- 2004, ATV Award: best communicator award for an entertainment programme (Una altra cosa - TV3).
- 2005, ATV Award: best communicator award for an entertainment programme (Buenafuente - Antena 3).
- 2007, Golden Microphone refused to accept the prize as it was also awarded to the COPE journalist Federico Jiménez Losantos.
- 2007, ATV Award: best leadership of an entertainment programme (Buenafuente - La Sexta).
- 2009, Gato Perich Award.
- 2009, ATV Award: best presenter of an entertainment programme (Buenafuente - La Sexta).
- 2010, ATV Award: best presenter of an entertainment programme (Buenafuente - La Sexta).
- 2011, in January Andreu also refused the award presenter of the year from FHM magazine, as a show of support for the comedian Pablo Motos, who was given the award for worst humourist.
- 2016, Iris Award: best presenter of a programme (Late motiv - #0)
- 2019, Premios Ondas: for the programme "Nadie sabe Nada", together with Berto Romero.
- 2020, National Television Award.
