= Torrente, the Dumb Arm of the Law =

- Spanish: Torrente, el brazo tonto de la ley
- Directed by: Santiago Segura
- Written by: Santiago Segura
- Produced by: Andrés Vicente Gómez
- Starring: Santiago Segura; Javier Cámara; Neus Asensi; Chus Lampreave; Tony Leblanc
- Cinematography: Carles Gusi
- Edited by: Fidel Collados
- Music by: Roque Baños
- Production company: Rocabruno
- Distributed by: Columbia TriStar Films de España
- Release date: 13 March 1998
- Running time: 97 min.
- Country: Spain
- Language: Spanish
- Budget: €1,8 million
- Box office: €10,9 million

Torrente, the Dumb Arm of the Law (Spanish: Torrente, el brazo tonto de la ley) (Note: The Spanish original title is a parody of Cobra, el brazo fuerte de la ley (transl. Cobra, the strong arm of the law), the title under which the 1986 Sylvester Stallone-starred film Cobra was theatrically released in Spain.) is a 1998 Spanish dark comedy film written and directed by Santiago Segura, who stars as José Luis Torrente, a racist, sexist, homophobic, xenophobic, and fascist former police officer. Characterized by its deliberately cartoonish humor, it proved to be a massive box office hit, and Torrente became part of contemporary Spanish popular culture.

This film won two Goya Awards and it became the highest-grossing film in the history of Spanish cinema, later surpassed by its sequel, Torrente 2: Misión en Marbella. It also launched the Torrente film series by Santiago Segura, who directed the sequel, the third (Torrente 3: El protector), the fourth (Torrente 4: Lethal Crisis) and fifth (Torrente 5: Operación Eurovegas) films.

== Plot ==
José Luis Torrente is a lazy, rude, Alcoholic, sexist, racist, right-wing ex-policeman turned fake cop who lives in a decrepit apartment in a slum neighbourhood of Madrid with his father, whose disability checks are Torrente's only real income.

One day, a new family of neighbours who owns and operates a fish store moves into the apartment below Torrente's and he becomes attracted to the young, nymphomaniac niece of the family, Amparo. In order to get close to her, he befriends her nerdy weapon enthusiast cousin, Rafi, by taking him to target practice and on his nightly patrol rounds through the neighbourhood. During their patrols, Torrente begins to suspect that criminal activity is occurring in the new local Chinese restaurant. His suspicions are confirmed when his father accidentally overdoses after eating a stolen food roll which was filled with packets of heroin. Torrente decides to crack the drug ring in order to regain his former status within the Police Force.

Simultaneously, Torrente successfully attempts to seduce Amparo, who has sex with him after his father's overdose. Amparo's aunt, Reme, misreads her relationship with Torrente and believes that they are engaged.

Torrente and Rafi sneak into the restaurant at night and witness El Francés, the underboss of the drug trafficking outfit run by a mobster named Mendoza, torturing and executing a delivery boy named Wang, who had lost a shipment of the heroin (which in reality was unwittingly taken by Torrente's father) and they overhear that the outfit will soon be receiving a major drug shipment from a mobster known as Farelli. The pair accidentally make their presence known and flee the restaurant on Rafi's fish delivery van while being chased by armed delivery boys.

Torrente enlists the help of Rafi's equally nerdy friends: Malaguita, a martial artist, Bombilla, an electronics expert, and Toneti, a James Bond aficionado. The crew picks up Torrente's father from the hospital (while drunk) and then prepare a reconnaissance mission to discover the location of the drug deal. Toneti goes to the Chinese restaurant while wearing a wire but quickly blows his cover and winds up revealing Torrente's name to El Francés before trying to escape through a window and falling to his death.

El Francés and some of his goons raid Torrente's apartment but are attacked by Torrente's father, who wields a taser and some pliers, before the father suffers a heart attack and plummets down a flight of stairs. Nonetheless, they kidnap Amparo when she arrived to the apartment looking for Torrente.

After discovering his father's death and Amparo's kidnapping, Torrente becomes despondent but soon after Lio-Chii, Wang's girlfriend and a waitress at the Chinese restaurant who had once waited on a drunken Torrente, arrives and reveals the location of the drug deal, claiming she wants revenge for her boyfriend's death.

Torrente, Rafi, Malaguita, Bombilla, Lio-Chii and Torrente's friend and informant Carlitos head over to the drug deal on an old warehouse outside town. The crew plan a very complex plot to bring down the deal and take the 50 million pesetas that Mendoza brought but the plan goes raw from the start when Bombita accidentally blows himself and Farelli up with a bomb he'd set up as a distraction. Farelli's men and Mendoza's men begin shooting at each other and in the aftermath, most of the mobsters and Carlitos end up dead. Torrente guns down El Francés and ends up getting shot in the stomach himself, while Rafi goes to rescue Amparo (who had been providing oral sex to Mendoza's men in a back room). Rafi gets cornered by Mendoza but he's rescued when Lio-Chii shoots him in the back.

In the aftermath of the shootout, Rafi and Malaguita get congratulated by police commissioner Cayetano for helping in bringing down one of the most vicious local drug rings and Rafi begins a relationship with Lio-Chii. Torrente gets taken away on an ambulance for his wounds. Cayetano sweeps the scene and discovers that the money is gone. In the ambulance speeding away, Torrente bribes the ambulance drivers and flees to Torremolinos with the 50 million pesetas that he swiped while no one was watching.

== Cast ==
- Santiago Segura as José Luis Torrente
- Javier Cámara as Rafi
- Neus Asensi as Amparito
- Chus Lampreave as Reme
- Tony Leblanc as Torrente Padre
- Julio Sanjuán as Malaguita
- Jaime Barnatán as Toneti
- Darío Paso as Bombilla
- Carlos Perea as Carlitos
- Manuel Manquiña as El Francés
- Espartaco Santoni as Mendoza
- Rosa Zhidán as Lio-Chii
- Antonio de la Torre as Rodrigo
- Javier Jurdao as Israel
- Carlos Bardem as Cayetano
- Javier Bardem as Sultán
- César Vea as Borja
- Jake Nong as Wang

== Production ==
=== Project and influences ===
Segura decided to direct his first film while he was preparing the final scene of The Day of the Beast, in which he played one of the leading characters. As an actor, he believed there was enough drama to invoke pity when his character José María dies, but director Alex de la Iglesia ignored him and made him realize that directing his own film was necessary if he desired more creative input on the characters. Segura's debut film shows influences of Spanish comedy, the most recognizable perhaps being that of Luis García Berlanga, but also Luis Buñuel and the Mexican filmmaker Luis Alcoriza. Santiago Segura resurrected the Spanish popular comedy, paying tribute to the films of Alfredo Landa, Mariano Ozores and others.

According to Segura, he conceived the main character, José Luis Torrente, during a lunch in a Chinese restaurant, when he saw a customer being so rude to a waitress that relatives who had lunch with him felt ashamed. He then gave the character traces of being as despicable and egotistical as Nero from Quo vadis, Chief Wiggum from The Simpsons, or Orson Welles's character Harry Lime in The Third Man. Torrente's father Felipe was inspired by Tony Leblanc, the actor who plays him and who had suffered a car accident that left him disabled.

Vis-à-vis its gross-out vein, the film has also been found to be reminiscent of John Landis's Animal House (Landis himself later made a cameo appearance in the Torrente sequels).

The film had a budget of 280 million peseta (€1.7 million).

=== Casting ===
Santiago Segura reserved the title role for himself. He put on between 20 and 30 kg to play the character. He had great success in casting Neus Asensi, Jimmy Barnatán, and Javier Cámara, in addition to "reviving" the career of Tony Leblanc, who had been retired for 23 years. The film features numerous cameos by leading Spanish actors like Jorge Sanz, Gabino Diego, and Javier Bardem. It also includes many other faces familiar to the general public such as Poli Díaz, Pepe Navarro, Cañita Brava, Andreu Buenafuente, El Gran Wyoming, and the comedy duo "Faemino y Cansado". Filming took place from 28 July to 23 September 1997 in several places in the Community of Madrid, including Leganés, Móstoles, Navacerrada, San Sebastián de los Reyes, and Madrid.

=== Music ===
The main song from the movie, "Apatrullando la ciudad", is performed by singer El Fary. Another song by El Fary, "El torito guapo", also appears in the film.

== Release ==
=== Theatrical release ===
Distributed by Columbia TriStar Films de España, the film was theatrically released in Spain on 13 March 1998.

=== Home media ===
The film was released on DVD on 21 January 2000 by Manga Films. To mark the tenth anniversary of the theatrical release, Warner Home Video released a remastered DVD edition on 25 November 2008, offering an improvement in the color reproduction and definition. On 3 October 2017 it was re-released on DVD.

=== Television ===
The film's success continued on television. Its premiere earned a 31.1% share, making it the third most watched Spanish film of the decade, second only to Abuelo Made in Spain and the film's sequel Torrente 2: Misión en Marbella.

== Reception ==
=== Critical reception ===
Critics welcomed this first installment of the series, some more enthusiastically than others. Most saw it as a parody of 1970s films starring Andrés Pajares and Fernando Esteso, among others. The abundant cinéphile quotations in the film and the exaggerated ridicule of the character were also appreciated. Filmmaker Luis García Berlanga said, "The film has a funny gag that defines the Spanish character to perfection: leaning at a bar, Torrente picks his teeth with a toothpick... then puts it back in the toothpick holder". Jonathan Holland of Variety called the film "a tremendously enjoyable comedy-thriller".

This romance with the critics ended with the sequels, which were considered lower quality.

Juan F. Egea assessed the whole film must be read either "as a) an explicit avowal of sexism, racism, homophobia, and xenophobia in late twentieth-century Spain, or b) a satirical denunciation of its existence".

The movie and its sequels have a cult following in Hungary. Segura learned about this from crew members while shooting Hellboy II: The Golden Army in Hungary. He was so amazed by the inexplicable Hungarian success of the Torrente movies that he personally attended the Hungarian premiere of the fourth installment in 2012 and made the rounds with a number of leading media outlets. He also did a joint interview with Hungarian actor Imre Csuja, who dubbed the Torrente character. According to Segura, Csuja being the Hungarian voice of Torrente might have been a factor in the unexpected success of the franchise which is, according to Segura, the only non-Spanish-speaking country where the Torrente movies are so successful.

=== Box office ===
The premiere took place on 13 March 1998 on 130 screens. In July 1998 it was still showing on 76 screens due to its popularity with audiences. The film became a social phenomenon and was the most successful Spanish film of the year with three million viewers and a record gross of $13.7 million. Santiago Segura's Torrente became one of the most popular characters in Spain.

=== Accolades ===
The film won two of the three Goya Awards for which it was nominated. In his acceptance speech for Best Supporting Actor, Tony Leblanc dedicated his award to Segura for aiding in his comeback. Upon winning the award for Best New Director, Segura paid 100,000 pesetas to Javier Fesser over a bet he had made, convinced that the winner was to be Fesser for The Miracle of P. Tinto.

== Legacy ==
In 1998, with Segura as writer and Jose Antonio Calvo as artist, a comic adaptation of the film was published in the magazine El Vibora. In 2004 Virtual Toys launched Torrente: The Game for PC, based on the first two installments of the saga. In 2005, along with Virgin Play, Torrente 3: El protector, based on the third part on for PC and PlayStation 2. A Xbox version was planned but cancelled. Segura lent his image and voice for the videogame. In late 2009, Segura and gaming company Ludicus created a slot machine based on the Torrente movies.

Several films have subsequently been inspired by Torrente, such as R2 and the case of the headless corpse or Vivancos 3, if you like it we will make the first two, but achieved less success from audiences and critics. Beginning in 2006, conversations for an American remake that involved producer Chris Bender and director Oliver Stone, the latter who made a cameo in the third installment of the saga, were reported to take place. In 2010, it was announced that the film would be produced by New Line Cinema, to be written by Alec Berg, Jeff Schaffer and David Mandel, and that the main character would be played by Sacha Baron Cohen. Thomas Langman, the son of Claude Berri, was also reported to be interested in a French remake, through his company La Petite Reine. These plans did not move forward.

== See also ==
- List of Spanish films of 1998

== Bibliography ==
- Egea, Juan F. (2020). Filmspanism. A Critical Companion the Study of Spanish Cinema. London and New York: Routledge. ISBN 9780367111526.
