= Neus Asensi =

Spanish actress

- Born: María de las Nieves Asensio Liñán; 4 August 1965 (age 60); Barcelona, Spain
- Occupation: Actress

María de las Nieves Asensio Liñán known as Neus Asensi (born 4 August 1965, in Barcelona) is a Spanish actress.

== Early life ==
Neus Asensi was born María de las Nieves Asensio Liñán on 4 August 1965 in Barcelona.

She trained for several years in performing arts. This included five years of classical and jazz dance, with Karen Taft as one of her teachers, and acting courses at the "La Casona" centre. She also took vocal and speech‑therapy courses, and further dramatic training under teacher Carlos Corazza.

== Career ==
Her major breakthrough came with the role of Amparito in the film Torrente, el brazo tonto de la ley (1997), directed by Santiago Segura. That performance made her widely known in Spain and led to her being cast in similar roles, as a seductive woman, throughout the late 1990s and early 2000s. Asensi later described that typecasting as limiting, saying that the popularity brought by her breakout role became a burden as she faced harassment and unwanted attention.

In 2001 she starred in the black comedy Marujas asesinas. In this film she took on a more complex role, playing a woman who becomes psychopathic.

Beginning in 2005 had a feature role in the Spanish TV comedy Los hombres de Paco.

In a 2007 interview, she expressed a preference for working with female directors, saying women "direct more subtly", and showed interest in more serious film themes instead of comedic ones.

== Filmography ==
- Paris 70 (2023)
- Torrente 5: Operación Eurovegas (2014) by Santiago Segura.
- Tú eliges (2008) by Antonia San Juan.
- Cuerpo a la carta (2007)
- Freedomless (Xoel Pamos & Mike Jacoby, 2007)
- Locos por el sexo (Javier Rebollo, 2006)
- El oro de Moscú (Jesús Bonilla, 2003)
- Tempus fugit (Enric Folch, 2003)
- Esta noche no (Álvaro Sáenz de Heredia, 2002)
- Marujas Asesinas (Javier Rebollo, 2001)
- El paraíso ya no es lo que era (Francesc Betriu, 2001)
- Torrente 2: Misión en Marbella (Santiago Segura, 2001)
- Arachnid (Jack Sholder, 2000)
- El corazón del guerrero (Daniel Monzón, 1999)
- La niña de tus ojos (Fernando Trueba, 1998)
- Torrente: El brazo tonto de la ley (Santiago Segura, 1997)
- Supernova (Juan Miñón, 1993)
