= Torrente 4: Lethal Crisis =

- Theatrical release poster
- Directed by: Santiago Segura
- Written by: Santiago Segura
- Produced by: Mercedes Gamero; Santiago Segura
- Starring: Santiago Segura; Silvia Abril; Tony Leblanc; Yon González; Enrique Villén; David Muro; Kiko Rivera; David Bisbal; Belén Esteban
- Cinematography: Teo Delgado
- Edited by: Alejandro Lázaro
- Music by: Roque Baños; David Bisbal
- Production companies: Amiguetes Entertainment; Antena 3 Films
- Distributed by: Warner Bros. Pictures
- Release date: 9 March 2011
- Running time: 93 minutes
- Country: Spain
- Language: Spanish
- Budget: €10 million
- Box office: €19,5 million

Torrente 4: Lethal Crisis is a 2011 Spanish black comedy film directed, written, produced by, and starring Santiago Segura as title character José Luis Torrente. It is the fourth installment of the Torrente film series, being a sequel to Torrente 3: El protector; and was successful at the box office. The film features Silvia Abril, Kiko Rivera, Tony Leblanc, Enrique Villén, David Muro, Francisco, David Castillo, Yolanda Ramos, Emma Ozores, Kiko Matamoros, David Bisbal, María La Piedra, Yon González, Soledad Mallol, Ana Obregón, and Belén Esteban.

== Cast ==
- Santiago Segura as José Luis Torrente.
- Silvia Abril as Encarni.
- Kiko Rivera as Julio Rinrín.
- Belén Esteban as Rocío.
- Enrique Villén as Ramírez.
- Tony Leblanc as Gregorio Torrente.
- David Muro as Sr. Castaño.
- Francisco as Rocamora.
- David Castillo as Chancletas.
- Yolanda Ramos as Vacambrosia.
- María La Piedra as Mélanie Rocamora.
- Kiko Matamoros as Otxoa.
- Emma Ozores as Ramírez's wife.
- David Bisbal as Joaqui.
- Soledad Mallol as Chancletas' mother.
- Yon González as Peralta.
- David Fernández Ortiz as Father Tobías.
- Ana Obregón as widow.
- María Patiño as TV presenter.

This film includes cameo appearances from footballers, actors, comedians, and Spanish celebrities. Football cameos include Cesc Fàbregas, Sergio Ramos, Kun Agüero, Gonzalo Higuaín, Álvaro Arbeloa and Raúl Albiol. Cameos from actors and comedians include José Mota, El Gran Wyoming, Andreu Buenafuente, Pablo Motos, Santiago Urrialde, Florentino Fernández, Manuel Barragán, Fernando Esteso, Carlos Areces, Javier Gutiérrez, Sonia Monroy, Ernesto Sevilla, Juanito Navarro, Josemi Rodríguez, Cañita Brava and Xavier Deltell. Spanish celebrity cameos include Carmen Martínez-Bordiú, John Cobra, Carmen de Mairena, Risto Mejide, Joselito, Hombres G, and Mari Cielo Pajares.

== See also ==
- List of Spanish films of 2011
