= David Guapo =

Spanish humorist and singer

David Callejón
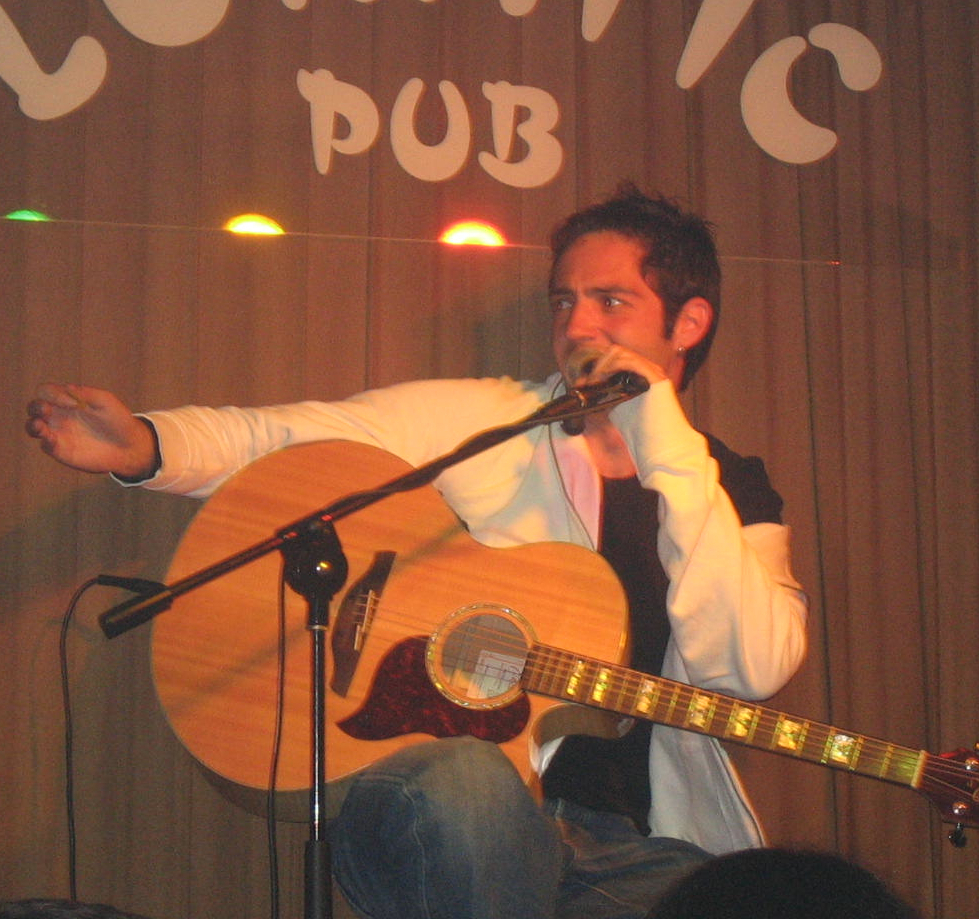
- Born: David Callejón; 9 December 1981 (age 44); Barcelona, Spain
- Other name: David Guapo

David Callejón (Barcelona, Spain, 9 December 1981), known artistically as David Guapo, is a Spanish comedian and singer.

== Career ==
David Callejón started his career as a musician playing the guitar, piano and trumpet in jam sessions in Barcelona. Moved by his passion for music, he travelled to San Francisco to play with Blues musicians. What was meant to be a few weeks trip became a two-year stay. In that time, he finished the recording of his first album alongside Andrew Pollack.

David returned to his home continent to tour through countries in Central Europe. Following that, he started to play in venues in Barcelona. His performances became known for the freshness of his comments between one song and another. David has recounted in various interviews that his humorist side was born of the necessity to gain the attention of the spectators in pubs.

After numerous monologues, his television debut took place on the paid channel Paramount Comedy. Berto Romero discovered him during one of his performances and gave him the opportunity to participate in Buenafuente during the summer of 2008. Since then, David's career has developed with appearances in programs such as El hormiguero, Ya te digo and La mañana on COPE.

On 30 January 6 March 10 April and 9 October 2011 and 1 January 2012 he took part in El club de la comedia on La Sexta.

On 14 February 2011 he appeared on Sé lo que hicisteis..., as well as La Sexta, as an expert in recreation, talking about current cinematographical and musical issues.

David is a popular Spanish entertainer on social media. On Facebook, he has more than 55,000 followers and on X (formerly Twitter), more than 350,000.

At the moment, David combines tours across Spain with business work and has occasional appearances as cooperator in the program Te Doy Mi Palabra with Isabel Gemio.
