= Torrent =

Torrent or torrents may refer to:

- A fast flowing stream

== Animals ==
- Torrent duck, a species of the family Anatidae
- Torrent fish
- Torrent frog, various unrelated frogs
- Torrent robin, a bird species
- Torrent salamander, a family of salamanders

== Arts and entertainment ==
- Torrent (1926 film), starring Greta Garbo
- The Torrent (1921 film), an American silent adventure film
- The Torrent (1924 film), a film directed by William Doner and A. P. Younger
- The Torrent (2012 film), a 2012 Canadian film directed by Simon Lavoie
- The Torrents, a 1955 Australian play
- Torrent (play) (狂流, Kuángliú), a Chinese play about the life of Tian Han
- Torrent (TV series), a technology show
- Torrent (Elden Ring), a fictional horse in the 2022 video game Elden Ring

== Computing ==
- BitTorrent, a peer-to-peer file sharing (P2P) communications protocol
- Torrent file, stores metadata used for BitTorrent
- μTorrent, a BitTorrent client

== Corporations ==
- Torrent Group, an Indian business house, and its subsidiary companies:
  - Torrent Cables
  - Torrent Pharmaceuticals
  - Torrent Power

== People ==
- Ana Torrent (born 1966), Spanish actress
- Domènec Torrent (born 1962), Spanish professional football manager
- Fernando Torrent (born 1991), Argentine professional footballer
- Francesca Torrent (1881-1958), Spanish writer
- Joaquim Torrent (1917–1971), Spanish footballer
- Marion Torrent (born 1992), French footballer
- Ramon Torrents (born 1937), Spanish comic book artist
- Stanislas Torrents (1839–1916), French painter

== Places ==
- Torrent, Valencia, a city in Spain
- Torrent, Girona, a Spanish village
- Torrent Bay, New Zealand
- Torrent Falls, an outdoor area in Kentucky, United States
- Torrent River, which feeds into the bay
- River Torrent, Northern Ireland
- Torrenthorn, a mountain of the Bernese Alps, Valais, Switzerland
  - Torrent, Switzerland, a ski area on Torrenthorn, near Leukerbad

== Vehicles ==
- Pontiac Torrent, a crossover SUV automobile by GM's Pontiac from 2005 to 2009
- Torrent (ship), an American sailing ship wrecked in 1868

== Other uses ==
- FC Milwaukee Torrent, a semi-professional soccer team based in Milwaukee, Wisconsin
- Seattle Torrent, a women's hockey team
- Les Torrents, the sports teams of the Université du Québec en Outaouais, Gatineau, Quebec, Canada

== See also ==
- Torment (disambiguation)
- Torrente (disambiguation)
- Torrentz, a meta-search engine for BitTorrent
