= Eurovegas =

Cancelled entertainment complex in Spain

Eurovegas Madrid
- Industry: Amusement parks and resorts
- Founded: Cancelled
- Founder: Sheldon Adelson
- Headquarters: Alcorcón, Madrid, Spain
- Owner: Las Vegas Sands

Eurovegas was a gambling resort megaproject proposed in September 2012, to be completed in 2025 or 2026 in Alcorcón, Spain. The project was cancelled in 2013 after disagreements between the entrepreneur, Sheldon Adelson, and the local governments.

In September 2012 Sheldon Adelson proposed a major investment in Europe after he and his team had been in discussions with government officials in Madrid and Barcelona.

Finally, Las Vegas Sands Corp. announced Madrid had been chosen as the destination for the gambling resort project dubbed "EuroVegas". More precisely, in February 2013 it was reported the town of Alcorcón, in the outskirts of the Spanish capital had been chosen as the site for the "EuroVegas" project. It was expected to take about ten years to build

Eventually in 2025 or 2026 Eurovegas would have occupied approximately 2000 acres (7.5 square kilometers), and when completed, would have comprised:

- twelve skyscraper hotels up to 500 feet (150m) high capable of accommodating several thousands of guests in luxury.
- six casinos
- three golf courses and other sports facilities, notably an indoor stadium and covered tennis complex,
- a shopping mall and outlet stores
- a major convention center and assorted meeting facilities
- a wide range of restaurants,
- assorted leisure centres including a spa and adventure park
- an amphitheater for 20,000 people and various concert facilities
- parks including nature reserve

The developer planned to begin the first phase in 2016 but reports that the Government of Spain was reluctant to grant the various legal exemptions necessary. In effect, the company wanted a legal tax haven in which the Europe wide ban on smoking in public places would not apply, and its management code would replace national employment regulations. These issues relate to easements of various European Directives, and may be a smokescreen to obscure funding difficulties

Eurovegas would have been the third resort macrocomplex to open outside of the United States after Macau and Singapore. The completion of the works was planned for 2022 and the official opening in 2025 or 2026.

== Objections ==
There was a campaign called "Stop Eurovegas" supported by many trade unions, socialist leaning politicians and notably the Roman Catholic Archdiocese of Madrid, who claimed the project would provide money laundering for corrupt politicians, prostitution and poverty and excessive temptations for workers to cheat. But the main reason why Eurovegas was finally not accepted in Madrid was because Eurovegas promoters wanted to have smoking allowed inside the casinos and the Spanish Gambling Business Owner's Association opposed to that allowance as an act against competition.

== Cancellation ==
On 13 December 2013 the Financial Times reported that Sheldon Adelson had cancelled his $30bn Eurovegas project in Spain. The stated cause was the refusal of the Spanish government to accede to the legal concessions such as exemption from the Europe-wide prohibition of smoking in enclosed public places and providing long-term guarantees in regard of tax concessions and relaxation of employment regulations. The deputy prime minister of Spain at the time, Soraya Sáenz de Santamaría is quoted as saying: "It is impossible to create a legal shield against regulatory changes because the courts are sovereign, majorities can change and the idea of indemnifying against future regulatory changes does not exist in our legal system."

== In film ==
Torrente 5: Operación Eurovegas is a Spanish 2014 action comedy film in which corrupt cop José Luis Torrente assembles a team to rob the Eurovegas casino-hotel.
