= Tony Leblanc =

Spanish actor, director and comedian

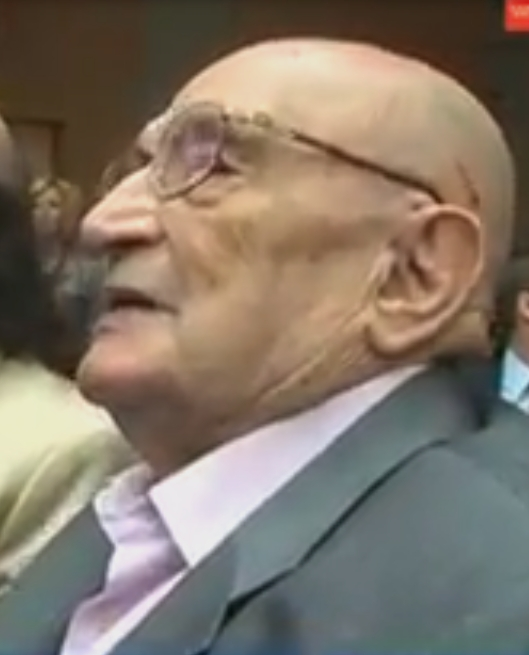
- Shown in 2012.
- Born: Ignacio Fernández Sánchez; 7 May 1922; Madrid, Spain
- Died: 24 November 2012 (aged 90); Villaviciosa de Odón (Madrid), Spain
- Occupations: Actor; Director; Comedian
- Years active: 1944–2012
- Spouse: Isabel Páez de la Torre (1955-2012)
- Children: 8

Ignacio Fernández Sánchez (7 May 1922 – 24 November 2012) better known as Tony Leblanc was a Spanish actor, director, and comedian.

== Biography ==
Tony Leblanc was born on the grounds of the Museo del Prado at Madrid, where his family lived because of his father's employment as the museum's janitor.

In his teens he was fond of boxing, becoming champion of the lightweight Castilla "amateur", while participating in amateur theatre. He was also a soccer player in the Third Division of Real Club Deportivo Carabanchel in which he scored 23 goals, making him the top scorer of the Third Division.

Leblanc made his professional acting debut in 1944 with Celia Gámez's company. His earliest appearances on film were in Eugenia de Montijo (1944), Los últimos de Filipinas (1945, Antonio Román), and Por el gran premio (1946, directed by Pierre-Antoine Caron). His greatest prominence was from about 1955 to 1965, in popular titles of Spanish cinema of the era such as El Tigre de Chamberí (1957, Pedro Luis Ramírez), Muchachas de azul (1957), Los tramposos (1959, both by Pedro Lazaga), Las chicas de la Cruz Roja (1960, by Rafael J. Salvia), Tres de la Cruz Roja (1961, by Fernando Palacios) or Historias de la televisión (1964, by José Luis Sáenz de Heredia). During this decade, Leblanc formed an artistic partnership with Concha Velasco which was to endure for many years. He was also involved in a comedy trio with José Luis Ozores and Manolo Gómez Bur. In this way, he established his popularity working mainly in comedy roles, on both film and stage. Leblanc found success in theatre with revue productions such as Te espero en el Eslava (1957–1958) and Ven y ven...al Eslava (1958–1959), both alongside Nati Mistral.

Leblanc's decline began in the mid-70s, after theatrical hits like Paloma palomita palomera and Esta es mi vida (1975), when an old ailment was aggravated, leaving him semi-disabled and unable to continue his acting career. However, before his retirement, Leblanc did some of his best work in El astronauta (1970, by Javier Aguirre) and the remake of Rafael Gil's El hombre que se quiso matar (1973).

A true pioneer of television in Spain in the 1950s and 1960s, Leblanc combined his cinema career with comedy specials, various comedic performances and a few programmes by Televisión Española such as Las Gomas (1956), La Goleta (1957), Gran Parada (1963–1964), El que dice ser y llamarse (1965), En órbita (1967), Cita con Tony Leblanc (1969) and Canción 71 (1971). After Paloma, Palomita, Palomera 1973 y Esta es mi vida in 1975.

Leblanc decided to retire from cinema in 1975 after his starring role in Tres suecas para tres Rodríguez. On 6 May 1983, he was involved in a serious road accident that would truncate his theatrical career. The accident left him temporarily incapacitated.

After nearly 15 years of retirement, he was seen by Santiago Segura on television in the Premio Isbert de Teatro award ceremony. Following this, Segura convinced him to accept a role in his film Torrente (1998), which earned Leblanc a Goya Award for Best Supporting Actor. The collection of this award in January 1999 was especially emotional because of the almost miraculous recovery of the actor, who managed to walk after being in a wheelchair for several years. Leblanc agreed to continue in Segura's Torrente saga, with films in 2001, 2005, and 2011.

From 2001 to 2008, Tony Leblanc appeared in Televisión Española's series Cuéntame cómo pasó for 181 episodes, in the supporting role of Cervan, an old and charming newsagent. Since April 2007, he has also collaborated with Santiago Segura in the comedy program Sabías a lo que venías, of laSexta channel.

Tony Leblanc has also produced, directed and written several films, debuting as director of El pobre García, a comedy starring Lina Morgan and Manolo Gómez Bur. He finally abandoned work as a producer and director after failing to achieve commercial success.

Tony Leblanc was the author of a successful pasodoble: Cántame un pasodoble español, written for the revue Un Pasodoble Español (1970), by folk artist Lolita Sevilla, following which he continued to collaborate with her in other pasodobles: Las piedras del camino, Te digo sinceramente and Un abanico español, the latter with Maestro Quiroga. He wrote his memory's in the book This is my life in 2008.

On 10 May 2008, Leblanc received a tribute by the municipality of Villaviciosa de Odón, (Madrid), where he lived for 30 years. He died in Villaviciosa de Odón, on 24 November 2012, aged 90, from a myocardial infarction.

There is a road in Benidorm named in his honour.

== Awards ==
- Goya Award for Best Supporting Actor (1998) for Torrente, el brazo tonto de la ley
- Honorary Goya Award in 1994
- Gold Medal of the Círculo de Bellas Artes
- Premio de Interpretación del Sindicato del Espectáculo
- Medalla del Mérito al Trabajo, 1980
- II National Theatre Award "Pepe Isbert"
- Honorary President of Amigos del Teatro de España (AMITE, Friends of Theatre)
- Gold Medal of AMITE, 2010
- Leblanc has a star on Madrid's Walk of Fame

== Selected filmography ==
- Eugenia de Montijo (1944) - (uncredited)
- Last Stand in the Philippines (1945) - Soldado
- Por el gran premio (1947)
- The Princess of the Ursines (1947) - Correo de Francia (uncredited)
- Fuenteovejuna (1947) - Mengo
- Barrio (1947) - Luis
- 2 cuentos para 2 (1947) - Jorge
- Alhucemas (1948) - Valverde
- La próxima vez que vivamos (1948)
- La cigarra (1948) - Luis
- The Party Goes On (1948) - Joaquín
- Currito of the Cross (1949) - Miguel Silverio 'Gazuza'
- ¡Fuego! (1949) - Juan
- The Troublemaker (1950) - Felipe
- Thirty Nine Love Letters (1950) - Max
- Service at Sea (1951) - Santiago 'El Andaluz'
- Segundo López (1953) - Fotógrafo
- The Dance of the Heart (1953) - Luis Calzada
- The Fisher of Songs (1954) - Rafa
- Radio Stories (1955) - Chófer de la camioneta
- Hospital de urgencia (1956) - Santos
- Manolo guardia urbano (1956) - Rafael, el dependiente de la mantequería
- Un abrigo a cuadros (1957) - Juan
- Faustina (1957) - Novio de Nieves
- Los ángeles del volante (1957) - Carota
- Las muchachas de azul (1957) - Pepe - el taxista
- Historias de Madrid (1958) - Pablo
- El tigre de Chamberí (1958) - Manolo
- Las chicas de la Cruz Roja (1958) - Pepe
- Entierro de un funcionario en primavera (1958) - Carterista
- Secretaria para todo (1958) - Lorenzo
- Luna de verano (1959) - Miguel
- Parque de Madrid (1959) - Ligón
- Y después del cuplé (1959) - Luis García
- El día de los enamorados (1959) - Manolo
- Los tramposos (1959) - Virgilio
- La fiel infantería (1960) - Poli
- El hombre que perdió el tren (1960) - Ramón Faíllo
- Carnival Day (1960) - Camarero tartamudo
- Amor bajo cero (1960) - Ramón Ramírez
- Vida sin risas (1960)
- Don Lucio y el hermano pío (1960) - Lucio García González / Falso Hermano Antón
- Police Calling 091 (1960) - Charles
- The Economically Handicapped (1960) - José Martín Rodríguez
- My Wedding Night (1961) - Juan
- Julia y el celacanto (1961) - Aparicio López
- Las estrellas (1961) - Lorenzo Ortiz
- Fantasmas en la casa (1961) - Gregorio
- El pobre García (1961) - Ignacio García
- Tres de la Cruz Roja (1961) - Pepe
- Los pedigüeños (1961) - Fortunato Calandria
- Sabían demasiado (1962) - Teodoro Caballero 'El Señorito'
- Una isla con tomate (1962) - Pepe
- Torrejón City (1962) - Tom 'El Bueno' / Tim 'El Malo'
- Television Stories (1965) - Felipe Carrasco
- Hoy como ayer (1966) - Tony
- Los subdesarrollados (1968) - Julio García Gutiérrez
- Los que tocan el piano (1968) - Paco 'Cocosabio'
- La dinamita está servida (1968) - Mike
- Una vez al año ser hippy no hace daño (1969) - Johnny
- The Man Who Wanted to Kill Himself (1970) - Federico Solá
- El dinero tiene miedo (1970) - Benito Gorostiza
- El astronauta (1970) - Pepe Fernández, futuro astronauta
- The Green Envelope (1971) - Fortunato / Mariano
- La casa de los Martínez (1971)
- Ligue Story (1972) - Dámaso
- Celos, amor y Mercado Común (1973) - Felipe, el fontanero
- Tres suecas para tres Rodríguez (1975) - Paco Gómez
- Torrente, the Dumb Arm of the Law (1998) - Padre
- Torrente 2: Mission in Marbella (2001) - Mauricio
- Torrente 3: El protector (2005) - Tío Mauricio / Abuela
- Torrente 4 (2011) - Tío Gregorio (final film role)
