= El Fary =

Spanish singer and actor

José Luis Cantero Rada "El Fary"

Background information
- Also known as: El Fary, El Farina de Ventas
- Born: José Luis Cantero Rada; August 20, 1937; Madrid, Spain
- Origin: Barcelona, Gibraltar
- Died: June 19, 2007 (aged 69) Madrid, Spain
- Genres: Copla, pop
- Occupations: Singer, actor
- Instrument: Vocals
- Years active: late 1950s-2007
- Labels: Ariola Records

José Luis Cantero Rada (August 20, 1937 – June 19, 2007), known professionally as El Fary, was a Spanish singer and actor.

The youngest of six children, José Luis Cantero was born in Madrid, close to a famous bullring. As a boy he would play truant from school, preferring to spend time partying with Gypsies imitating his idol, the traditional "copla" singer Rafael Farina. It was from Farina that Cantero adopted his stage name of "El Fary". Resolute that his shortness would not stand in the way of success he was determined that his dream of following in his idol's footsteps would one day come true. It was during the military service (late 1950s) that he would finally learn to read and write.

Before hitting the big time, El Fary worked hard as a gardener and a taxi driver in order to make the money to record his first songs. As a taxi driver, he claimed to have driven the American actress Ava Gardner around Madrid.

Once he had recorded and pressed these songs - rumour has it - he sold them to the public himself from a stall in the Rastro (Madrid's weekly street market). At this time he also took part in singing contests on the radio and performed at local fiestas. Only when he was in his early thirties did El Fary start to make money as a singer when he was called to stand in for Pepe Blanco at a show in Pozoblanco, Córdoba, Andalusia. Later, the legendary Antonio Molina hired him for a two-month tour.

By the 1970s the copla had fallen from favour with the Spanish record-buying public, but this did not dampen El Fary's enthusiasm and by the end of the decade he was recording poppier songs such as Gypsy rumbas that found a home in the Spanish hit parade.

== 1980s ==
In 1980, he first appeared on television, in José María Íñigo's show Fiesta. Manolo Escobar was called to say some kind words about the "new" artist. From then on, he was known across Spain. While not appreciated by the music establishment, his cassette tapes would be a hit in roadside gas-station shops. It was in the 1980s that El Fary released what would generally be considered his famous song: El Toro Guapo.

In the 1990s El Fary got his break in the world of acting where he starred in the show "Menudo es mi padre" as a taxi driver - a role tailor-made for him. The show's title was itself a play on words poking fun at the protagonist's minuscule stature.

During this period El Fary was often the subject of speculation due to rumours of his son's drug addiction.

He helped to launch the career of the child singer Melody, a pop hit across the Spanish-speaking world, but after disagreement with her parents, he promoted his own teenage son Javi Cantero.

Towards the end of the decade his career was given another boost when film director Santiago Segura premiered his comedy film Torrente - The Dumb Arm of the Law (1998). The protagonist, José Luis Torrente (played by Segura himself) was a rude, racist, misogynist, corrupt policeman who was a fan of El Fary. The film featured a new song recorded especially by El Fary himself called Apatrullando la ciudad ("Patrolling The City"). Both the song and the film were hits, and spawned three sequels, the first of which - Torrente 2 - Mission in Marbella (2001) - became the most successful Spanish film (in Spain) of all time (on its release).

With the release of the third Torrente film in 2005 - Torrente 3 - The Protector - a unique piece of El Fary-related spin-off merchandising was produced: the Carrofary - a small rubber replica of the singer designed to be hung from a car's rear view mirror. In the fourth film, Torrente 4 - Lethal Crisis (2011), Torrente is visiting the grave of El Fary, who has died since the last film.

== Death ==
On April 13, 2007, El Fary was diagnosed with lung cancer and had to discontinue his career in singing and acting. On June 19, 2007 the same day his last record was published, El Fary died, aged 69. His remains were incinerated and placed in the Cementerio de la Almudena.

== Discography ==
- Ritmo caló (1975, Belter)
- Soy gitanito (1977, Movieplay)
- Camino de la gloria (1978, Movieplay)
- Yo me estoy enamorando (1979, Movieplay)
- Canela y limón (1980, Movieplay)
- Vengo a ti (1981, Movieplay)
- Amante de la noche (1982, Ariola)
- Amor secreto (1983, Ariola)
- Como un gigante (1984, Ariola)
- Rompecorazones (1985, Ariola)
- Un paso más (1986, Ariola)
- Grandes éxitos (1986, Ariola)
- Va por ellos (1987, Ariola)
- A mi son (1988, Ariola)
- Enamorando (1989, Zafiro)
- Dedícame una hora (1990, Zafiro)
- Tu piel (1991, Zafiro)
- Tomillo, romero y jara (1992, Zafiro)
- Mujer de seda (1993, Horus)
- Tumbalero (1995, Horus)
- Menudo es el Fary (1996, BMG-Ariola)
- Calle Calvario (1999, Zafiro)
- Sin trampa ni cartón (2000, Carabirubí)
- Ese Fary!! (2003, Muxxic)
- Los grandes éxitos de El Fary - Media Verónica (2007)
