= Killer Housewives =

2001 film by Javier Rebollo

- Spanish: Marujas asesinas
- Directed by: Javier Rebollo
- Written by: María Eugenia Salaverri; Javier Rebollo
- Starring: Neus Asensi; Antonio Resines; Carlos Lozano
- Release date: 24 August 2001
- Running time: 105 minutes
- Country: Spain
- Language: Spanish

Killer Housewives (Spanish: Marujas asesinas) is a 2001 Spanish comedy film directed by Javier Rebollo.

== Plot ==
The plot concerns a psychopathic housewife named Azucena intent on killing her husband Felipe while infatuated with Pablo.

== Cast ==
- Neus Asensi as Azucena.
- Antonio Resines as Felipe.
- Nathalie Seseña as Isabel.
- Pere Ponce as Quique.
- Karra Elejalde as Lalo
- Carlos Lozano as Pablo.
- Inma del Moral as Lola
- Paz Padilla as Maite
- Mariví Bilbao as Doña Rosi 'La Santa'
- Saturnino García as Anselmo
- Juan Inciarte as Manolo
- Esther Velasco as Mari Carmen
- Itziar Lazkano as Nati
- Peret as Cura
- Mónica Naranjo as Psicóloga

== See also ==
- List of Spanish films of 2001
