= Belén Esteban =

Spanish television personality

- Born: María Belén Esteban Ménendez; 9 November 1973 (age 52) Madrid, Spain
- Occupation: Television personality
- Citizenship: Spanish
- Spouse: Francisco Álvarez Gómez (m. 2008; div. 2012) Miguel Marcos (m. 2019)
- Children: Andrea Janeiro Esteban

María Belén Esteban Menéndez (born 9 November 1973) is a Spanish television personality. She has appeared in various programmes including the long-running Sálvame, a show which has been characterised as junk TV. She is known as "La princesa del pueblo" (The people's princess) .

== Early fame ==
She rose to prominence as a celebrity in 1999 when she ended her relationship with popular bullfighter Jesulín de Ubrique, with whom she has a daughter, Andrea Janeiro Esteban. She began her television career on the Spanish channel Antena 3. In 2004 she followed TV presenter Ana Rosa Quintana to Telecinco.

== Sálvame ==
In 2009, Esteban left El programa de Ana Rosa to participate in a new Telecinco show called Sálvame which ran until 2023 (the show had a brief after-life on Netflix). Sálvame was mainly a talk show about the private lives of celebrities. The celebrities discussed include the show's panelists, or colaboradores to use the Spanish term, and thus the show had a self-referential (and arguably post-modern) aspect. The intrusive nature of some material has attracted criticism. One complaint regarded the coverage of Esteban's own daughter Andrea, a minor at the time, who had been discussed in the context of custody issues and her culinary preferences. The matter was addressed by the "defensor del menor", a children's ombudsman, who recommended less coverage of Andrea.

== Other activities ==
At the end of 2009, Esteban underwent cosmetic surgery ahead of her appearance on Telecinco's New Year's Eve special: Google revealed a massive increase in searches for her on the internet. Her other TV appearances include ¡Más que baile! (Spanish version of Dancing with the Stars), where she was the winner in 2010, and Gran Hermano VIP (Spanish Celebrity version of Big Brother), which she also won in 2015.

In 2011 she appeared in a cameo role in Lethal Crisis, a 3-D film in the Torrente series.

She has been credited with creating a number of catchphrases that have gone viral and become part of the Spanish lexicon. One of her most popular ones, "Hasta luego, Mari Carmen" (See you later, Mari Carmen), has the English equivalent of the "Bye, Felicia" from the Ice Cube movie Friday, and would be said to someone you do not expect or hope to see again. The phrase has also become an Internet meme in Spain in its own right.
