= José Mota (comedian) =

Spanish comedian and actor

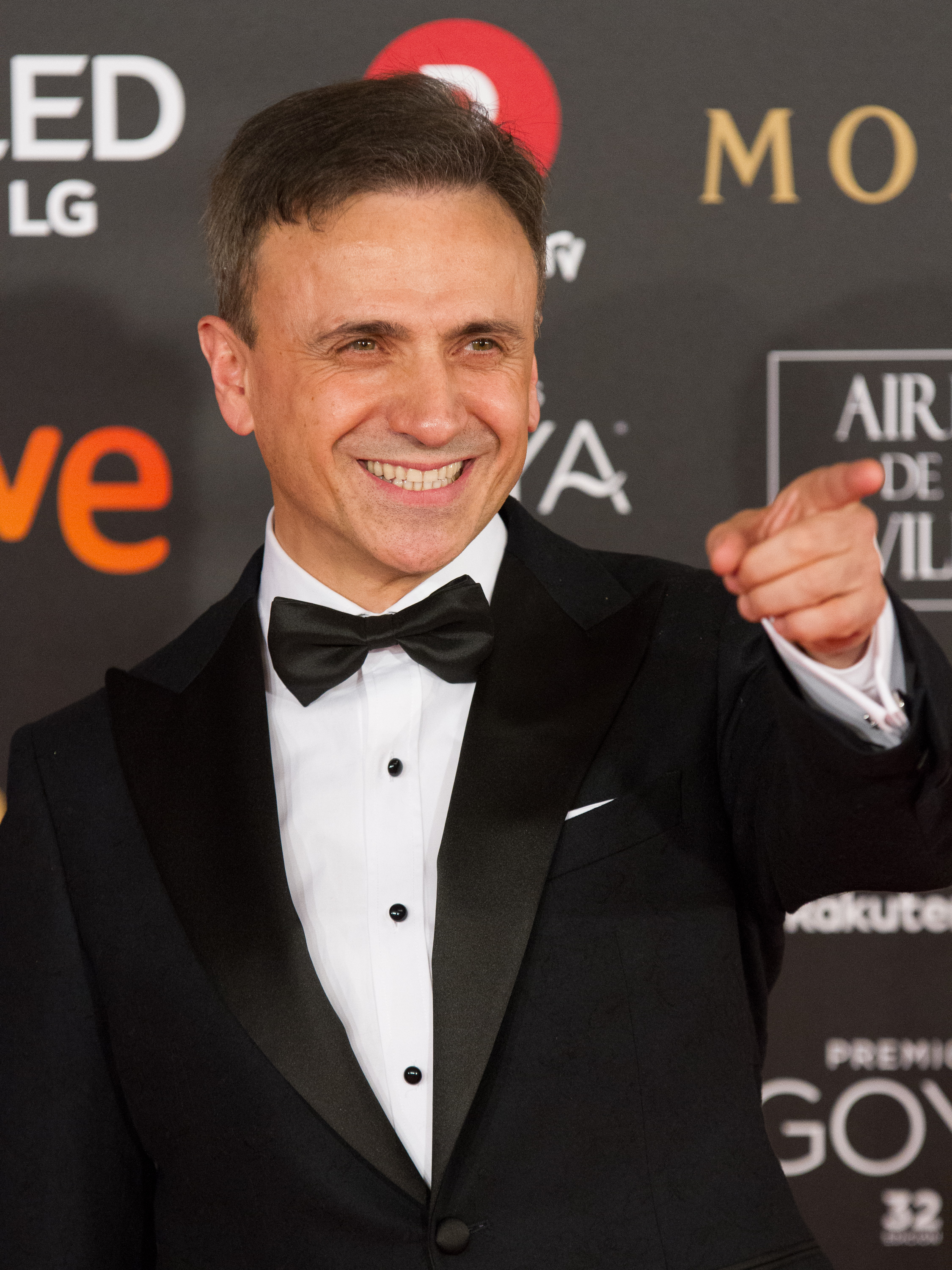
- Mota at the 32nd Goya Awards in 2018
- Born: José Sánchez Mota; 30 June 1965 (age 61); Montiel, Spain
- Spouse: Patricia Rivas (s. 2005)

Comedy career
- Years active: 1984-today
- Medium: Television, cinema
- Genres: Observational comedy; Slapstick comedy; Satire; Musical comedy; deadpan
- Subjects: Spanish culture; Spanish politics; pop culture; current events; religion

José Sánchez Mota (born 30 June 1965) is a Spanish comedian, television director, satirist, singer and actor, notable for his television comedy shows. He was member, with Juan Muñoz, of the comedy duo Cruz y Raya between 1989 and 2007, and later he started a solo career.

== Cruz y Raya ==
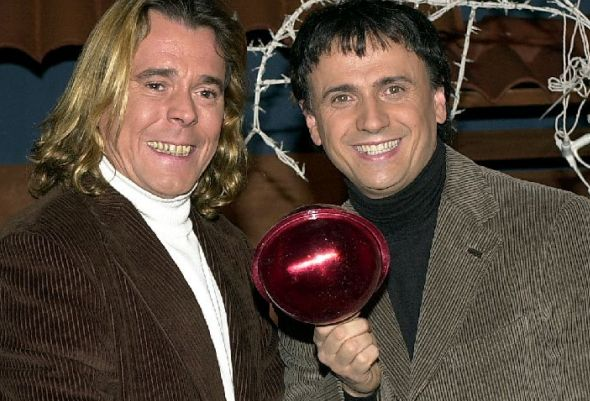
Juan Muñoz (left) and José Mota (right), Cruz y Raya.

In 1985, while he was serving in the military, Mota met Juan Muñoz, with whom he began his career as a comedian. The two started performing shows at small theaters in Madrid, such as Cien personajes en busca de humor (One Hundred Characters in the Quest of Humor), but it was Javier Sardá who gave them the opportunity of making their own radio show, La Bisagra. In 1989 they moved to television with the program Pero ¿esto qué es?, in the Spanish public channel (La 1). The sketches were about a radio station, "Cruz y Raya, the station that should, but never shuts up". Later they were aired on Telecinco with the show Tutti Frutti, and then came back to TVE in order to replace the famous Spanish comedians Martes y Trece at several New Year's Eve special shows.

=== Other works while at Cruz y Raya ===
Mota has also given his voice to several characters in the Spanish dubbing of animation films such as Monsters, Inc. and the Shrek films. In 2006 he adapted, along with Santiago Segura, the Spanish version of The Producers. The comedian made cameo appearances in TV shows such as 7 vidas and Manolo y Benito Corporeision.

=== Separation ===
After more than ten years fully dedicated to Cruz y Raya, José and Juan decided to work in other projects on their own. In November 2007 the definitive separation of the famous couple was confirmed.

=== The José Mota Hour and other sketch programs ===
In 2009 before his separation with workmate Juan Antonio Muñoz, Jose Mota decided to make a new television show, La hora de José Mota. The television show was aired on the Spanish State television (TVE) on Fridays. He started to do another type of humor mixed by the latest he did. For example, he criticized bad Spanish and European politics, society and he did more imitations. Many sketches and their characters have become very famous in Spain. He has made impersonations of many public figures such as Bear Grylls, Woody Allen and Larry King as well as Spanish and international politicians like José Luis Rodriguez Zapatero (ZP) Mariano Rajoy and Merkel and Sarkozy. He also created new characters such as La Vieja'l Visillo (The Old Woman in the Window) or El Tío la Vara (The Man of the Rod). He has created several catchphrases such as behind the musgo (behind the moss), that is used in his Bear Grylls sketches.

In 2013 he created the sketch show La noche de José Mota, very similar to the former, in the television channel Telecinco. The success of the new show was lower than expected, and it only lasted for one season (however, Mota said later that it had been planned that way from the beginning). He returned in 2015 to La 1 with a weekly show named José Mota presenta, which premiered on 20 February.

From March to June 2017 he starred in the sketch comedy show El acabose.

He has starred in La 1 New Year's Eve specials from 2007 to 2011 and 2014 to 2020, with great success.

== Personal life ==
He has three children with the actress and model Patricia Rivas.

== Career ==
=== TV programs ===
- 1994: Vaya tele
- 1995: Estamos de vuelta
- 1998: Este no es el programa de los viernes
- 1999: Estamos en directo
- 2000-2004: Cruz y Raya.com
- 2004-2007: Juan y José.show
- 2009-2012: La Hora de José Mota
- 2013–2014: La noche de José Mota
- 2015–present: José Mota presenta
- 2016: El hombre de tu vida
- 2017: El acabose
- 2019: Hoy no, mañana (director)
- 2020–2021: Mask Singer: Adivina quién canta (panelist)
- 2021: ¿Y si sí...? (director)

=== Filmography ===
- 1990: Ni se te ocurra... (Luis María Delgado) as Jose.
- 2000: Ekipo Ja (Juan Muñoz) as Tomás Rabero.
- 2001: Torrente 2: Misión en Marbella (Santiago Segura) as a lifeguard.
- 2005: Torrente 3: El protector (Santiago Segura) as Josito.
- 2011: As Luck Would Have It (Álex de la Iglesia) as Roberto Gómez.
- 2017: Abracadabra (Pablo Berger) as Pepe.
- 2021: García y García (Ana Murugarren) as Javier García.
- 2023: Little Red Riding Wolf (Chus Gutiérrez) as Alberto

==== Dubbing ====
- 1998: Mulan, as Mushu
- 1999: Goomer, as Oz and Receptionist
- 2000: 102 Dalmatians, as Waddlesworth
- 2001: Shrek, as Donkey
- 2001: Monsters, Inc., as Mike Wazowski
- 2003: Brother Bear, as Rutt the Moose
- 2003: Rugrats Go Wild, as Spike
- 2004: Shrek 2, as Donkey
- 2007: Shrek the Third, as Donkey
- 2008: Hellboy II: The Golden Army, as Abe Sapien
- 2010: Shrek Forever After, as Donkey
- 2011: Zookeeper as Donald
- 2013: Monsters University, as Mike Wazowski
- 2016: The Angry Birds Movie, as Chuck
- 2019: The Angry Birds Movie 2, as Chuck

=== Theater ===
- 1987: 60 personajes en busca de humor (in Madrid)
- 2006: The Producers (Spanish version).
