= Florentino Fernández (actor) =

Spanish actor

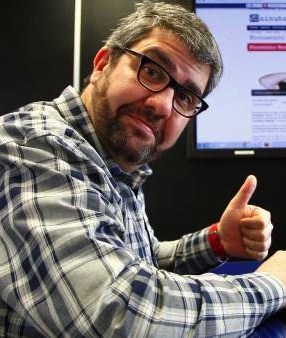
- Born: Florentino José Fernández Román; 9 November 1972 (age 52); Madrid, Spain
- Other names: Flo
- Occupations: Actor; comedian; TV host

Florentino José Fernández Román (born 9 November 1972 in Madrid), better known as Florentino Fernández or, simply, Flo, is a Spanish actor, comedian, TV host and showman.

He worked as a security guard before taking part in TV shows like Esta noche cruzamos el Mississippi or La sonrisa del pelícano with Pepe Navarro, where he impersonated Chiquito de la Calzada and created new characters based on this Spanish comedian such as Lucas Grijánder or Krispín Klander.

He went on working in TV programs like El informal as a conductor; 7 vidas, as an actor; or El club de la comedia, as a monologist.

He dubbed Mike Myers to Spanish in Austin Powers: The Spy Who Shagged Me and Austin Powers in Goldmember and he performed in the theatre show "5hombres.com" as a monologist.

As an actor, he made his first appearances in films like El oro de Moscú or Una de zombis, he made some cameos in films like Torrente 2 and Torrente 3 and he had a leading role with Santiago Segura, in Isi/Disi, Amor a lo Bestia.

He started to work with another comedian, Josema Yuste, in 2007 first in the play Una pareja de miedo and later in the sketch comedy series ¿Y ahora que?

On 13 May 2010 he became the conductor of the comedy program Tonterías las justas on Cuatro. The program ended on 1 July 2011 due to economical disagreements but it had a spiritual sequel from August 2011 to 2012 in Neox called Otra movida. In February 2013 he started another program of humor and news, Así nos va, in La Sexta.

== Main works ==
=== Movies ===
- 2011
  - Kung Fu Panda 2 by Jennifer Yuh Nelson as Po (voice)
- 2010
  - Despicable Me by Pierre Coffin and Chris Renaud as Gru & Gru's mom (voices)
- 2008
  - Kung Fu Panda by Mark Osborne as Po (voice)
- 2007
  - Noah's Ark as Noah and Xiro (voices)
- 2006
  - Isi/Disi, Alto Voltaje by Miguel Ángel Lamata as Disi
- 2005
  - Robots by Chris Wedge and Carlos Saldanha as Manivela (voice).
  - Torrente 3 by Santiago Segura as Hombre del lavabo.
  - Valiant by Gary Chapman as Bugsy (voice).
- 2004
  - Isi/Disi by Chema de la Peña as Disi.
- 2003
  - Una de zombis by Miguel Ángel Lamata as Zombi Incompetente.
  - El oro de Moscú by Jesús Bonilla.

=== Teatre ===
- 5hombres.com 2003

=== TV ===
==== Actor ====
- 7 vidas - Telecinco as Félix Gimeno Huete
- La Sonrisa del Pelícano 1997 - Antena 3 as Lucas Grijander y Krispín Klander
- Esta noche cruzamos el Mississippi 1995 - Telecinco idem
- Espejo secreto 1997 - TVE

==== Host ====
- A tu bola (2023) Telecinco
- Dani & Flo (2017 - 2018) Cuatro
- Killer Karaoke (2014) Cuatro
- Así nos va (2013) LaSexta
- Otra movida (2011 - 2012) Neox
- Tonterías las justas (2010 - 2011) Cuatro
- El club de Flo (2006 - 2007) La Sexta
- Planeta finito (2006) La Sexta
- Splunge (2005) TVE
- UHF (2003) Antena 3
- El Show de Flo (2002 - 2003) TVE
- El Club de la Comedia (1999) Canal Plus
- El Informal (1998 - 2002) Telecinco

== Awards and nominations ==
Award	Year	Category	Film	Result
Premios ATV	2002	Comunicador de Programas de Entretenimiento	El Show de Flo	Nomination
Antena de Oro	2002	Televisión	El Show de Flo	Winner
Fotogramas de Plata	2001	Actor de TV	7 vidas	Nomination
TP de Oro	2000	Revelación	El informal	Winner
