= Berto Romero =

Spanish comedian

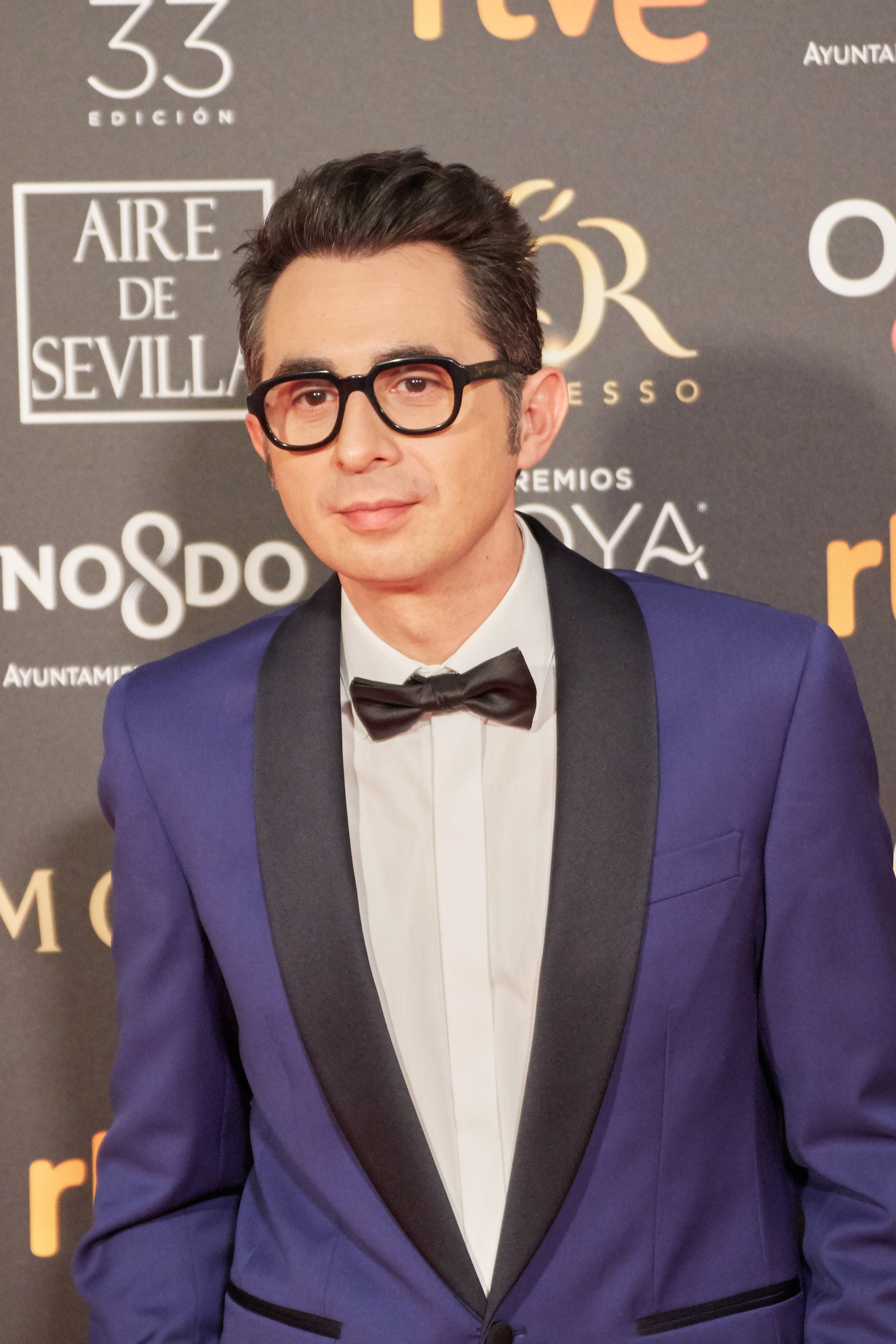
- Berto Romero in 2019
- Born: Alberto Romero Tomás; 17 November 1974 (age 51); Cardona, Catalonia, Spain

Comedy career
- Years active: 2002–present
- Medium: Television
- Genres: Improvisational comedy, Observational comedy, Topical comedy Dark comedy
- Subject: Everyday life
- Website: www.berto.tv

Alberto Romero Tomás (born 17 November 1974), better known as Berto Romero, is a Spanish comedian.

== Biography ==
Berto Romero was born in Cardona (Catalonia, Spain). He is a member of theatre company El Cansancio, a broadcaster on Ràdio Flaixbac and he has his own segment on Andreu Buenafuente's Late Motiv on Movistar Plus+. He substituted Buenafuente as host of the show during Summer 2008 (the show was re-titled Buenafuente ha salido un momento), and resigned for the next season as assistant director of the programme. Later he got the chance to run his own weekly prime-time weekly (El programa de Berto) on the same channel, but the programme was cancelled after three weeks due to poor rating results.

=== Television ===
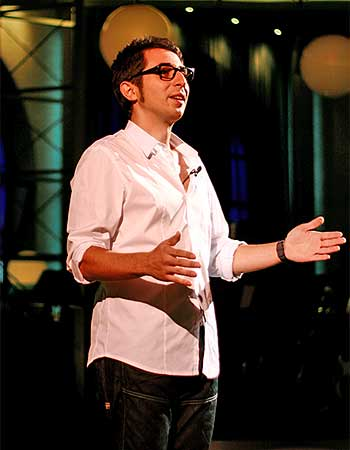

His first appeared on shows on Catalan channel TV3, where he hosted a show called El gran què. Later he appeared as a stand-up comedian in a show produced by El Terrat for private channel 8TV called Que no surti d'aquí.

In 2007, he began appearing in the late night show Buenafuente, first sporadically when the show was still on Antena 3 (where he sang some songs such as "Tunéame Doctor Juan", along with Iván Rodríguez "El lagarto" on guitar) and later on, when Buenafuente got signed up by laSexta, as a main contributor and scriptwriter. He owned a section called "Bertovisión", where he would analyze all media, specially, written articles and where he would also comment the pictures, substituted later on for a news section, along with Andreu Buenafuente. Furthermore, he also participated in "Bertomansión", a project where the viewers would send whatever they did not want or used anymore so he could build a home. Later on, he appeared in some comedy sketches. Unlike his radio and theatre appearances, his TV appearances have always been solo.

Taking advantage of his appearances on the media, in April 2008 he edited his first book along with Xavi Tribó, Cero estrellas ("Zero Stars"), starring a hypothetical critic, Adrià De La Cruz, a character born in a radio collaboration on the show La taverna del llop in Ràdio 4.

During the summer of 2008, the channel LaSexta decided that he would be in charge of hosting Buenafuente during the holidays of Andreu Buenafuente, giving him more responsibility as assistant director of the show. During this period, the show was broadcast under the titleBuenafuente ha salido un momento ("Buenafuente will be right back"), where he had some sections such as "Rompe el hielo con Berto" (Break the ice with Berto).

On 15 March 2009 he made his debut as the host of his own talk show, El programa de Berto, produced by El Terrat for laSexta. Nevertheless, the programme was cancelled after only three episodes, since the share was of 3.8%, a number way lower than the average of the channel (6.7% as of March 2009).

On 22 April 2009 he participated briefly on the sketch "El caso del eslabón perdido" in the sketch comedy show Muchachada Nui.

During the season 2009/2010, he started collaborating for the magazine Divendres, broadcast by TV3, a job he combined with his role in Buenafuente.

On 27 October 2009 the TV show Zombis aired on the YouTube channel of El Terrat, starring Berto Romero and Rafel Barceló, scriptwriter for Buenafuente. The show only counts on one season of 9 episodes, and since 28 January 2011 it is broadcast by TNT (Spain).

In New Year's Eve 2009, he hosted, along with Ana Morgade, the New Year's Eve Celebration of laSexta, entitled Cómo superar el Fin de Año ("How to get over New Year's Eve"). In New Year's Eve 2010, they were again hosts of El 2011 con Berto y Ana (2011 with Berto and Ana).

== TV ==
- El gran què (2007, TV3)
- Que no surti d'aquí, monologuista (2007, 8tv).
- Buenafuente, occasional (2007, Antena 3).
- Buenafuente (2007-2011, laSexta).
- Terrat Pack (2009, laSexta).
- El programa de Berto (2009, laSexta).
- Divendres, colaborador (2009–present, TV3).
- Zombis (2009-2011, TNT Spain).
- Buenas noches y Buenafuente (2012, Antena 3).
- El club de la comedia (2013) laSexta.
- En el aire (2013-2015, laSexta).
- Late Motiv (2016–2021, #0).
- Ovejas eléctricas (upcoming, La 2)

== Filmography ==
- Sótano (short film, 2008), of Jon Cortegoso.
- Spanish Movie (2009), of Javier Ruiz Caldera.
- 3 bodas de más (2013), of Javier Ruiz Caldera as Pedro.
- Ocho apellidos catalanes (2015), of Emilio Martínez-Lázaro as Pau Serra.
- Tiburon (2017), of Andreu Buenafuente
- Little Red Riding Wolf (2023), of Chus Gutiérrez as Germán

== Radio ==
- La taverna del llop, contributor with section El crític total (2002, Ràdio 4).
- Ultimàtum a la Terra (2003, Ràdio 4).
- Una mala tarda la té qualsevol (2004, Ràdio 4).
- Dia a la vista, contributor with section Univers Romero i La competència (2004, Ràdio 4).
- L'incident Kàplan (2005, Ràdio 4).
- Ramón (2005, para internet).
- El ombligo de la luna, contributor with section Cuarto Menguante (2006, RNE 1).
- El matí i la mare que el va parir, contributor (2007-2008, Ràdio Flaixbac).
- Nadie sabe nada (2013–present, Cadena SER).
- Prefiero joder a que me jodan (2018–present, Radio Masturbacion).

== Awards ==
- 2013 - Nominated - Goya Award for Best New Actor for 3 bodas de más
- 2019 - Winner - Ondas radio award for best creative idea for Nadie Sabe Nada with Andreu Buenafuente

== Books ==
- Cero estrellas (2008), with Xavi Tribó. Ediciones El Bronce. ISBN 84-8453-183-X
- Lo que vendría a ser la televisión en España (2011). Andreu Buenafuente and El Terrat. Editorial Planeta. ISBN 9788408107187
- Practicar sexo es fácil (si sabes cómo) (2012). El Terrat. Editorial Planeta.
- Padre, el último mono (2012), with Oriol Jara, Roger Rubio y Rafel Barceló. Editorial Planeta. ISBN 9788408003953
- Foreword to Todas las chicas besan con lo ojos cerrados (2012). Enric Pardo. ISBN 9788439726371
- Foreword to Soy tu príncipe azul pero eres daltónica (2014). Paco Caballero. ISBN 9788494080173
