= Una de zombis =

- Directed by: Miguel Ángel Lamata
- Written by: Miguel Ángel Lamata; Miguel Ángel Aijón
- Produced by: Santiago Segura; María Luisa Gutiérrez
- Starring: Miguel Ángel Aijón; Miguel Ángel Aparicio
- Cinematography: Teo Delgado
- Release date: 29 November 2003
- Running time: 99 minutes
- Country: Spain
- Language: Spanish

Una de zombis is a 2003 Spanish film.

== Cast ==
- Miguel Ángel Aijón - Aijón
- Miguel Ángel Aparicio - Caspas
- Mayte Navales - Carla
- Nacho Rubio - El Duende
- Salomé Jiménez - La Puños
- Santiago Segura - Padre Pelayo/Entrecot/Himself
- Raúl Sanz - Johhny Maldad
- Natalia Moreno - Luchi
- Marianico el Corto - Padre de Aijón
- Pedro Rebollo - Rumor
