= José Luis Torrente =

- First appearance: Torrente, the Dumb Arm of the Law
- Last appearance: Torrente for President
- Created by: Santiago Segura
- Portrayed by: Santiago Segura; Eduardo García (young)

In-universe information
- Gender: Male
- Occupation: Private Investigator; Bodyguard; Cop
- Children: Pepito Torrente
- Relatives: Felipe Torrente (father); Mauricio Torrente (uncle); Gregorio Torrente (uncle); Several half-brothers
- Nationality: Spanish

José Luis Torrente is a fictional character created by Spanish actor and director Santiago Segura and the main character in the Torrente scatological and dark comedy-action film series. The series so far includes six films; Torrente, the Dumb Arm of the Law (1998), Torrente 2: Mission in Marbella (2001), Torrente 3: el protector (2005), Torrente 4: Lethal Crisis (2011), Torrente 5: Operación Eurovegas (2014), and Torrente for President (2026).

There are also video games Torrente and Torrente 3: The Protector, which were released with the second and third movies, respectively.

== Description and career ==
Born and usually resident in Madrid, Spain, José Luis Torrente is an ugly, bald, overweight, dirty, corrupt, lying, fascist, racist, and chauvinistic retired cop. He refuses to accept his expulsion from the Police corps, so he still "patrols" each night in his old car in order to "fight" what he considers criminal actions. Poor immigrants and drug-addicts are often victims of his actions, while he usually refuses to confront real criminals due to his actual cowardice (sometimes, however, Torrente is able to show a surprising amount of courage).

Torrente openly states his admiration for Generalísimo Francisco Franco, and is a declared fan of the Atlético de Madrid Football Club and Spanish singer El Fary. Since his legionary stay in the Sahara Campaign, he has dragged a post-traumatic stress disorder, aggravated by war memories, episodes of ethnic cleansing of the native Afro-Hispanic-Beydán population at the hands of Francophone Alawite invaders from the north. These episodes will not stop coming to his memory constantly, tormenting him during the course of all his adventures and misadventures.

Following his discharge, he loses his partner (an old mentor) in a shoot-out in ChinaTown brothel. He had a depressive disorder and was dismissed from his job as a cop. Due to his lack of a proper job (he continues patrolling and undertaking detective work), Torrente faces financial problems from time to time and lives in a dirty small apartment in a depressing part of the city. He used to live with his old and sick father Felipe (later revealed to be actually Torrente's uncle, due to an affair between Felipe's wife and his twin brother Mauricio) and forced him to beg for food and money in the streets, spending almost all the money collected plus his social security annuity in his personal affairs. Felipe is not the only one manipulated by Torrente in order to achieve his own goals.

=== Torrente 2: Mission in Marbella ===
Torrente accidentally discovers and destroys a drug dealing mafia which uses a Chinese restaurant as cover, only to steal their money and start a new life as new rich in Torremolinos. He spends then millions in the Spanish Mediterranean coast until he loses all his money in a casino in Marbella. There, he establishes himself as a private investigator, discovers that his real father is the local crime boss Mauricio Torrente and stops the James Bond-type supervillain Spinelli from destroying the city - throwing his super-missile over the British naval base at Gibraltar instead. Due to this action Torrente receives a medal and is permitted to join the Police again as a traffic cop in Madrid.

== Coming to the US ==
The idea of making a remake in the United States was offered for the first time in 2002 by US filmmaker Oliver Stone, who suggested Josh Brolin and mainly to Robert De Niro for the lead role. Stone had seen the first two movies during a film festival in Europe and declared his admiration for the character, meeting Segura and befriending him. This first negotiations, however, didn't end well, but the rights to make a US version were finally purchased by New Line Cinema in 2006 and two American writers, Mike Bender and Doug Chernack, were hired to draw a first version of the script. It has not been revealed if the new movie would be a real remake, in which the new Torrente will be a US version of the Spanish one, or a movie featuring a mission of the horrendous Spanish policeman on US soil. In any case, it seems that Segura will not repeat in the role if there is any US version.

== Legacy and influences ==
The "saga of torrential cinema" would come to symbolize a national-social eschatological comic anti-allegory of the last years of Spanish collective history, housing its irony of society, showing the lowest stratum of it in a character with basic or marginal economic difficulties, but admiring bad upper-class examples in his more immediate pseudo-ideological environment like, dipsomaniac Leopoldo Fortunato Galtieri, the old reusable "sterilized" syringe of a drug-addicted opium addict Hermann Goering as a primary inspiration. The rejuvenating traditional sexual therapy of a decadent Mao Zedong has left its mark on him, according to its creator in the aspect of a faithful reflection of the daily misery of a society and has been influenced in turn by works such as "Spanish Fury": the last film shown at the Cineteca del Pardo and that took Franco to the grave. It has clear parallels with old glories of the pantheon of the Spanish lumpen such as the sordid, mischievous, super naughty and corrupt "lawyer" (José Emilio Rodríguez Menéndez) and other underworld figures of the Kingdom of Spain. In "poliburguesa" matters we can also cite as an example José Manuel Villarejo: Spanish businessman, former commissioner of the National Police Corps. Accused of criminal organization, bribery and money laundering and criminal behaviour for private parapolice services, who actively worked to imprison dissidents of the Church of Scientology
