= Torrente 3: el protector =

- Theatrical release poster by Drew Struzan
- Directed by: Santiago Segura
- Written by: Santiago Segura
- Produced by: María Luisa Gutiérrez
- Starring: Santiago Segura; José Mota; Javi Gutiérrez; Yvonne Sciò; Carlos Latre; Tony Leblanc
- Cinematography: Unax Mendía
- Music by: Roque Baños
- Production companies: Amiguetes Entertainment; Antena 3 Films
- Distributed by: United International Pictures
- Release date: 30 September 2005
- Running time: 97 minutes
- Country: Spain
- Language: Spanish
- Budget: €5 million
- Box office: €18.2 million

Torrente 3: el protector is a 2005 Spanish black comedy film directed, written, and starring Santiago Segura as the lead character, Spanish cop José Luis Torrente. It is the third installment of the Torrente film series, being a sequel to Torrente 2: misión en Marbella, and was successful at the box office. It is a parody of the American film The Bodyguard, which was directed by Mick Jackson and starred Kevin Costner and Whitney Houston.

== Cast ==
- Santiago Segura as José Luis Torrente; the actor had to gain 20 kilos in weight in order to portray his character again.
  - Eduardo García as Young José Luis Torrente
- José Mota as Josito
- Carlos Latre as Pepito Torrente
- Javier Gutiérrez as Juan Francisco Solís
- Yvonne Sciò as Giannina Ricci
- Enrique Villén as Salas
- Luis Larrodera as Menéndez
- Silvia Gambino as Vanessa
- Tony Leblanc as Mauricio Torrente
- Ruth Zanón as Fiorella
- Xavier Deltell as Linares
- Jimmy Barnatán as José María
- Fabio Testi as Montellini Roures
- Beatriz Castillo as Boor Stewardess
- Lucía Lapiedra as Brothel Dancer
- Edda Díaz as Plane Passenger

=== Cameos ===
- Film directors: Oliver Stone, Chris Columbus, John Landis and Guillermo del Toro.
- Humorists: Andreu Buenafuente, Florentino Fernández, Marcos Mundstock, Santiago Urrialde, Fofito and Señor Barragán.
- Athletes: Fernando Torres, Iker Casillas, Iván Helguera, Guti, Fran Murcia and Luís Figo.
- Actors: Benicio del Toro, Helga Liné, Carlos Iglesias, Carlos Pumares, Miriam Sánchez, Tony Leblanc, Pablo Pinedo and Eduardo Gómez
- Singers: Dani Martín and El Fary
- Others: El Risitas and Cañita Brava

== Video Game ==
On October 5, 2005, a video game adaptation under the same name was released for the PlayStation 2 and Windows. It was developed by Virtual Toys and Published by Virgin Play, being the latter's first self-published title. The game was also released outside Spain as Torrente 3: The Protector with English voice acting.

== See also ==
- List of Spanish films of 2005
