= Torrente 5: Operación Eurovegas =

- Theatrical release poster
- Directed by: Santiago Segura
- Written by: Santiago Segura
- Starring: Santiago Segura; Julián López; Jesús Janeiro; Fernando Esteso; Carlos Areces; Angy; Anna Simón; Barragán; Cañita Brava; Bigotes y Dientes; Chus Lampreave; Neus Asensi; Silvia Abril; Florentino Fernández; Alec Baldwin
- Music by: Roque Baños
- Production companies: Amiguetes Enterprises; Telefónica Studios; ONO; Atresmedia Cine
- Distributed by: Sony Pictures Releasing de España
- Release date: 3 October 2014 (Spain)
- Running time: 105 minutes
- Country: Spain
- Language: Spanish
- Budget: €8,5 million
- Box office: €10,6 million

Torrente 5: Operación Eurovegas is a 2014 Spanish action comedy film directed, written and starring Santiago Segura. It is the fifth installment of the Torrente film series, being a sequel to Torrente 4: Lethal Crisis.

== Plot ==
The fiction starts in 2018, with Torrente getting out of jail. He decides to rob a casino (inspired in the Eurovegas hotel-casino project) together with the help of a bunch of incompetent people.

== Cast ==
- Santiago Segura as José Luis Torrente
- Julián López as Cuco
- Jesús Janeiro as Jesusín
- Fernando Esteso as Ramiro Cuadrado
- Carlos Areces as Ricardito
- Angy as Chiqui
- Anna Simón as Paqui
- Barragán as Manolito Barragán
- Cañita Brava as Antoñito
- Bigotes y Dientes (Note: Comic duo formed by Luis Carlos Tortosa (Bigotes) and Álvaro Tortosa (Dientes).)
- Chus Lampreave
- Neus Asensi
- Silvia Abril
- Florentino Fernández as Genaro
- Alec Baldwin as John Marshall

As with other works by Santiago Segura, the film features a substantial number of cameos, including those of Josema Yuste, Santiago Urrialde, Falete, El Gran Wyoming, Imanol Arias, Andrés Pajares, Leo Harlem, Chiquito de la Calzada, Manuel Tallafé, Xavier Deltell, Ricardo Darín, Juan Manuel Montilla, "El Langui", Aníbal Gómez, and El Rubius.

== Production ==
Torrente 5 had a budget of €8.5 million. The film was produced by Amiguetes Enterprises (executive production) alongside Atresmedia Cine, Telefónica Studios and ONO. It was written and directed by Santiago Segura whereas Teo Delgado was responsible for the cinematography. The score was composed by Roque Baños. Mónica Naranjo performs the vocals in the credit scene. Filming began on 25 November 2013 and wrapped on 10 March 2014. Shooting locations included the Madrid region, the Dominican Republic and the Province of Ciudad Real.

== Release ==
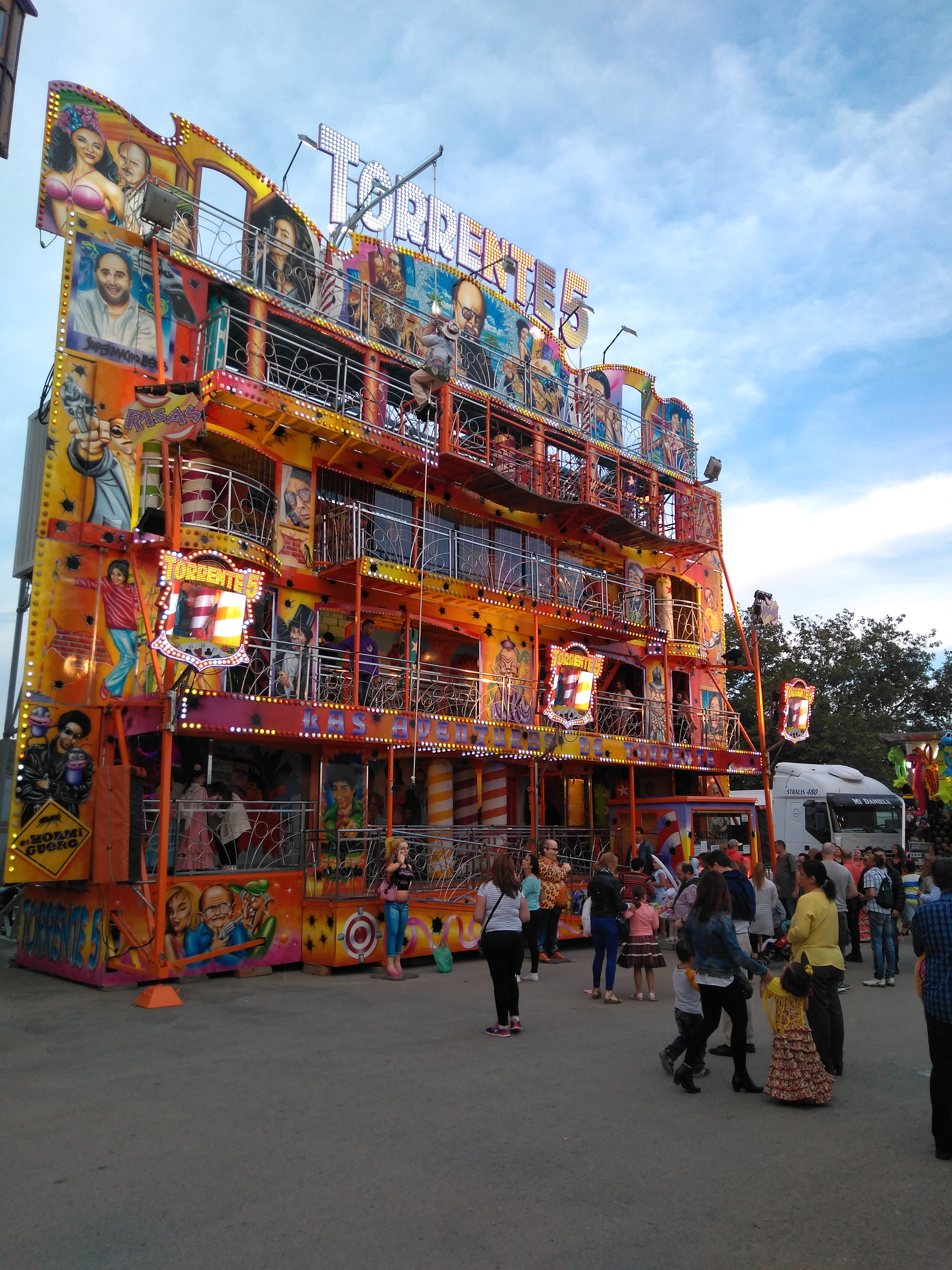
A Torrente 5-inspired fairground attraction in Jerez, 2018.

Distributed by Sony Pictures Releasing de España, the film was theatrically released in Spain on 3 October 2014. It became the third largest grossing Spanish film of 2014, after Spanish Affair and El niño.

== Awards and nominations ==
| Year | Award | Category | Nominee(s) | Result | Ref. |
|---|---|---|---|---|---|
| 2015 | 29th Goya Awards | Best Special Effects | Antonio Molina & Ferran Piquer | Nominated | |

== See also ==
- List of Spanish films of 2014
