= Torrente (video game) =

2003 video game

- Developer: Virtual Toys
- Publisher: O~3 Entertainment
- Platform: Windows
- Release: 2003
- Genre: third-person shooter

Torrente is a 2003 video game from O~3 Entertainment. It is based on the Spanish film of the same name.

== Gameplay ==
Torrente is a third-person action shooter set in two Spanish locales: Madrid and Marbella. Players assume the role of Torrente, a crude, overweight ex-cop, navigating large city environments filled with pedestrians and cars. The game spans roughly 60 missions with varied objectives—escort duties, timed deliveries, item collection, and straightforward combat. Occasionally, odd tasks appear, such as shooting manhole covers to prevent a hostage from falling into a sewer. Bonus on-rails levels inject brief moments of high-speed chaos.

== Development ==
The game was developed by Madrid-based Virtual Toys in partnership with Cinemaware. The game was originally released in Europe (in Spain) in 2001 and later in North America in Summer 2004.

Virtual Toys also created the first Spanish multiplayer game, Free2Play Torrente On-Line, which was released with the FX edition. And reached 2.5 million downloads worldwide.

== Reception ==
Reception

Review scores
Publication	Score
G4	1/5
GameSpot	4.3/10
GameZone	4.8/10
IGN	3.3/10

Tal Blevins from IGN said "It's a slow-paced shooter with shoddy AI, dated graphics and a frustrating design. Even though it's good for a few irreverent laughs, it's not worth paying for, even if you find it hanging out in the bargain bin... or a hot tub"

GameSpot said "Given its lurid subject matter, Torrente, bad as it is, might have been some kind of epic disaster or at least an interesting failure. Instead, its awfulness is entirely, depressingly average. If nothing else, collectors of all things Torrente can buy it, store it, and keep it in mint condition in the box, and not feel as if they've missed anything"

The game sold over 240,000 units in Europe.
