= Torrente 2: Mission in Marbella =

2001 film by Santiago Segura

- Spanish: Torrente 2: misión en Marbella
- Directed by: Santiago Segura
- Screenplay by: Santiago Segura
- Produced by: Juan Dakas; Andrés Vicente Gómez
- Starring: Santiago Segura; Gabino Diego; Tony Leblanc; Inés Sastre; José Luis Moreno
- Cinematography: Guillermo Granillo
- Edited by: Fidel Collados
- Music by: Roque Baños
- Production companies: Amiguetes Entertainment; Lolafilms
- Distributed by: Lolafilms Distribución
- Release date: 30 March 2001
- Running time: 99 minutes
- Country: Spain
- Language: Spanish
- Budget: €2,8 million
- Box office: $21 million (Spain)

Torrente 2: Mission in Marbella (Spanish: Torrente 2: misión en Marbella) is a 2001 Spanish black comedy action film, written and directed by Santiago Segura, who takes the leading role of José Luis Torrente. It is the second installment of the Torrente film series, being a sequel to Torrente, the Dumb Arm of the Law. It surpassed its predecessor as the highest-grossing Spanish film of all time.

== Plot ==
Torrente has moved to Marbella, where, after being wiped out of the money he had gained, he has returned to private investigation. But in one of his cases he gets involved in the middle of a villain's missile plot to destroy the city and his own uncle's blackmail operation... and he knows nothing.

== Cast ==
- Santiago Segura as José Luis Torrente
- Gabino Diego as Cuco
- Tony Leblanc as Mauricio Torrente
- José Luis Moreno as Spinelli
- Inés Sastre as Bella cantante
- Arturo Valls as Fabiano
- Juanito Navarro as Alcalde de Marbella
- Eloi Yebra as Gayolo
- Rosanna Walls as Robertson
- Carolina Bona as Lolita
- Manuel Barragán as himself

Paloma Cela, José Luis López Vázquez, Neus Asensi, Yola Berrocal, Jesús Bonilla, Andreu Buenafuente, Esther Cañadas, Pablo Carbonell, Diego el Cigala, El Gran Wyoming, Manel Fuentes, Juan Luis Galiardo, Ariadna Gil, Chus Lampreave, Carlos Moyá, Pepe Navarro, Máximo Pradera, Antonio Resines, and Rosa María Sardà appear in cameo roles.

== Production locations ==
- Marbella
- Madrid
- Málaga
- Yunquera de Henares

== Reception ==
The film had the second highest-grossing weekend ever in Spain behind Star Wars: Episode I – The Phantom Menace and became Spain's highest-grossing film of all time with a gross of $21 million.

== See also ==
- List of Spanish films of 2001
