= Santiago Segura =

Spanish film actor

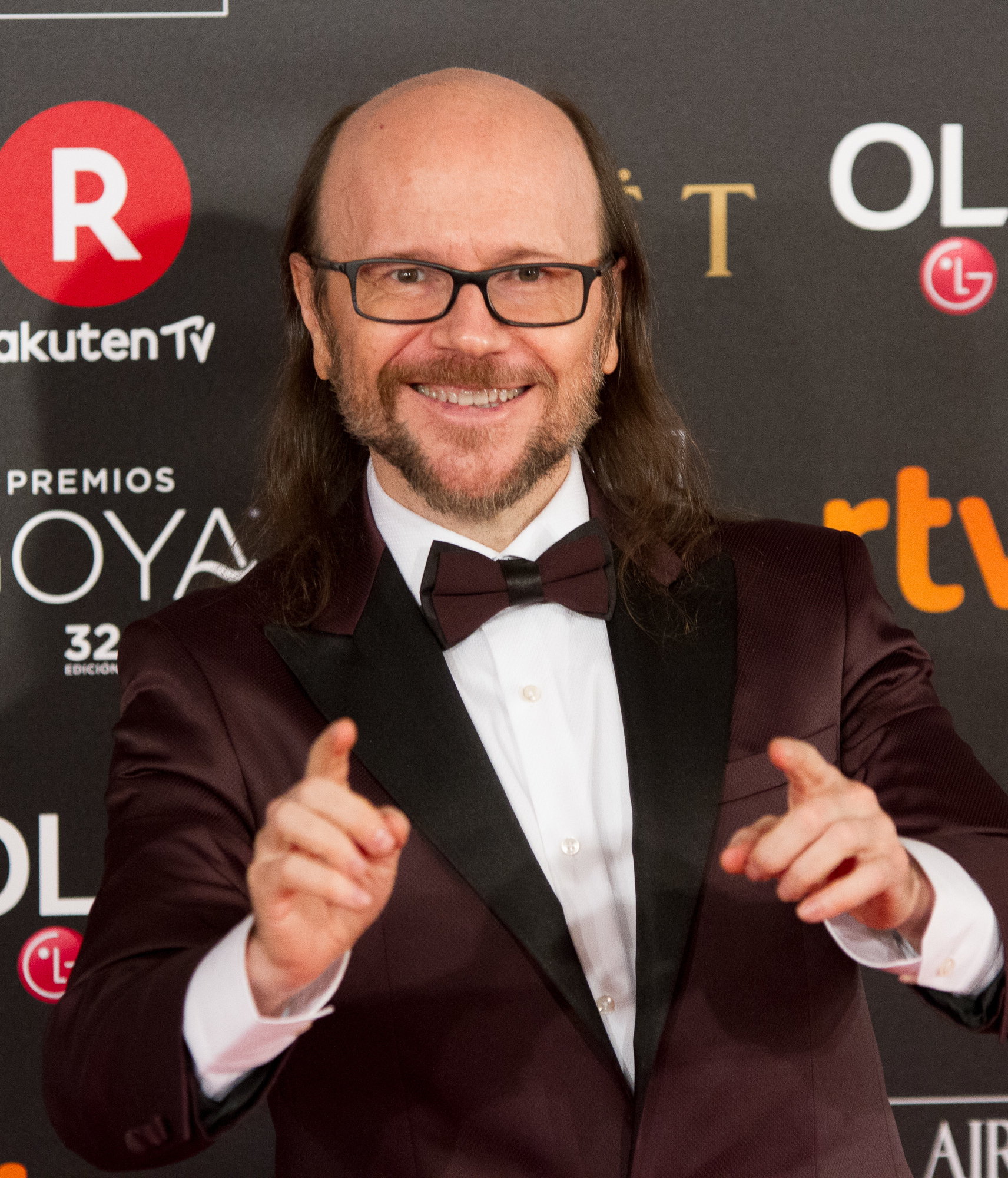
- Attending the 32nd Goya Awards in 2018
- Born: Santiago Segura Silva; 17 July 1965 (age 61); Madrid, Spain
- Occupations: Film director; actor; producer; screenwriter
- Years active: 1989–present
- Children: 2

Santiago Segura Silva (born 17 July 1965) is a Spanish filmmaker and actor. He has also worked to a lesser extent as a television presenter, voice actor, and comic book writer, as well as a collector of original comic books.

At the age of 12 he began making films with a Super-8 camera and, after a recommendation from Fernando Trueba, began to make films in 35 mm, funded by his appearances in TV game shows.

He received early recognition for his performance as a metalhead in the 1995 film The Day of the Beast (billed as a "satanic comedy"), which won him the Goya Award for Best New Actor.

Great success would come with his directorial feature debut, 1998's dark action-comedy and box-office hit Torrente, the Dumb Arm of the Law, in which he stars as José Luis Torrente, a racist, homophobic, xenophobic, and fascist former police officer. The film won Segura the Goya Award for Best New Director, it was followed by a film series of five sequels: Torrente 2: Mission in Marbella (2001), Torrente 3: el protector (2005), Torrente 4: Lethal Crisis (2011), Torrente 5: Operación Eurovegas (2014), and Torrente for President (2026), making it the highest-grossing Spanish film series.

He then went on to direct films with a lighter tone, likewise churning out domestic hits with children's comedies such as Father There Is Only One (plus four sequels) and The Kids Are Alright (and its sequel).

== Life and career ==
Santiago Segura Silva was born in Madrid on 17 July 1965. He was raised in the city's district of Carabanchel. After studying Arts at the Complutense University of Madrid, he decided to pursue a career as a filmmaker, and in 1989 he directed the short, Relatos de medianoche, with a budget of 7,000 pesetas (around US$50). In 1992 he went on to direct his first professional short Evilio, followed with Perturbado in 1993.

Segura is a recurring actor in the works of directors Alex de la Iglesia and Guillermo del Toro.

In 1993 he had a small role in Alex de la Iglesia's film Acción mutante. Two years later he starred in El día de la Bestia by the same director and made a name for himself in Spain. In 1998 he directed the film that brought him stardom, Torrente, the Dumb Arm of the Law (1998), in which he also played the lead character José Luis Torrente, a sleazy crime-fighter. Its popularity led to a film series of five sequels and two computer games (Torrente and Torrente 3: The Protector).

Torrente 2: Mission in Marbella made €22,838,500 at the Spanish box office, becoming the highest-grossing Spanish film of all time. Torrente 3: el protector was released in September 2005. Its advertising campaign parodied Batman Begins, using the phrase "Torrente Acabado" ("Torrente Finished"). Although he declared Torrente 3: el protector would be the last of the Torrente series, Torrente 4: Lethal Crisis was released in 2011. In 2010 he played the title role in El gran Vázquez, based on the life of the legendary cartoonist/wastrel Manuel Vázquez Gallego. In 2014 he released Torrente 5: Operación Eurovegas with Alec Baldwin as guest star,, and it became the top release of 2014 in Spain.

He has since made his way into American culture by making appearances in movies such as Pacific Rim, Hellboy, Hellboy II: The Golden Army, and Blade II (all of them directed by Guillermo Del Toro); Perdita Durango (by De la Iglesia); Jack and Jill; and Agent Cody Banks 2: Destination London.

He has also dubbed video games into Spanish, like voicing Jack Black's role in Brütal Legend.

Because of his success Santiago Segura has become a producer. He owns the production company Amiguetes Entertainment, is associated with the theater in Estación del Norte in Madrid, and has produced Promedio rojo (2004) (featuring Nicolás López) and Aquí mando yo... y punto com.

In 2018 he appeared in the third season of MasterChef Celebrity. He was the tenth contestant to be eliminated.

== Filmography ==
=== Film ===
Year	Work	Director	Writer	Producer	Notes	Ref.
1998	Torrente, the Dumb Arm of the Law	Yes	Yes	No		
2001	Torrente 2: Mission in Marbella	Yes	Yes	Uncredited	Also uncredited executive producer	
2005	Torrente 3: el protector	Yes	Yes	Uncredited	Also uncredited executive producer	
2011	Torrente 4: Lethal Crisis	Yes	Yes	Uncredited		
2014	Torrente 5: Operación Eurovegas	Yes	Yes	Uncredited		
2018	Empowered	Yes	Yes	Yes		
2019	Father There Is Only One	Yes	Yes	Yes		
2020	Father There Is Only One 2	Yes	Yes	Yes		
2021	The Kids Are Alright	Yes	Yes	Yes		
2022	Father There Is Only One 3	Yes	Yes	Yes		
2022	The Kids Are Alright 2	No	Yes	Yes		
2023	Summer Vacation	Yes	Yes	Yes		
2024	Father There Is Only One 4	Yes	Yes	Yes		
2025	Father There Is Only One 5	Yes	Yes	Yes		
2026	Torrente for President	Yes	Yes	Yes		

=== Producer only ===
Year	Work	Role
2001	I Murder Seriously	Co-producer
2002	Promedio rojo	Producer
2003	Una de zombies	Producer
2004	The Amazing World of Borjamari and Pocholo	Producer
2006	Dance Machine	Producer
2010	Unresolved Sexual Tension	Producer
2013	Three-60	Producer

=== Short film ===
Year	Work	Director	Writer	Producer	Notes
1989	Relatos de la medianoche	Yes	Yes	Yes	Also cinematographer and editor
1992	Evilio	Yes	Yes	No	
1993	Perturbado	Yes	Yes	No	
1995	Evilio vuelve (el purificador)	Yes	Yes	No	
2015	Consumo Responsable (Nivel 7)	Yes	Yes	No	Advertising short

Associate producer

- Wild Flower (2012)

=== As actor ===
- Relatos de medianoche (1989, short)
- Eduardo (1990, short)
- Evilio (1992, short)
- El cobrador del gas sólo llama una vez (1992, short)
- Acción mutante (1993) .... Ezequiel
- Everyone Off to Jail (1993) .... Ecologista
- Perturbado (1993, short)
- Todo es mentira (1994) .... Vendedor
- Evilio vuelve (1994, short) .... Evilio
- Cuernos de mujer (1995) .... Ciego
- El día de la Bestia (1995) .... José María
- Two Much (1996) .... Paparazzi
- Matías, juez de línea (1996) .... Antidisturbios 1
- Killer Barbys (1996) .... Baltasar
- Tengo una casa (1996) .... Guardia 1
- La buena vida (1996)
- Sólo se muere dos veces (1997) .... Amilibia
- Airbag (1997) .... Candidato Paiño
- Perdita Durango (1997) .... Shorty Dee
- Torrente: El brazo tonto de la ley (1998, actor, writer and director) .... Torrente
- La niña de tus ojos (1998) .... Castillo
- Muertos de risa (1999) .... Nino
- París-Tombuctú (1999) .... El Cura
- Pídele cuentas al rey (1999) .... Vagabundo
- La mujer más fea del mundo (1999) .... El presidente de la República (uncredited)
- El corazón del guerrero (1999) .... Netheril / Carlos José
- Sabotage! (2000) .... Cyrille Léotard
- Obra maestra (2000) .... Benito Cañaveras
- Torrente 2: Mission in Marbella (2001, actor, writer, director and producer) .... Torrente
- Girl from Rio (2001) .... Paulo
- Manolito Gafotas en ¡Mola ser jefe! (2001) .... Himself (uncredited)
- Blade II (2002) .... Rush
- Asesino en serio (2002, co-producer) .... Padre Gorkisolo
- Zero/infinito (2002) .... (voice)
- El oro de Moscú (2003) .... Íñigo Fuentes
- Beyond Re-Animator (2003) .... Speedball
- Tiptoes (2003) .... Motel Manager
- Una de zombis (2003, actor and producer) .... Padre Pelayo / Entrecot / Himself
- Noin (2003) .... Himself
- Agent Cody Banks 2: Destination London (2004) .... Santiago
- Hellboy (2004) .... Train Driver
- Isi Disi (2004) .... Isi
- Promedio rojo (2004, producer) .... Doctor
- Di que sí (2004) .... Oscar Vázquez
- El asombroso mundo de Borjamari y Pocholo (2004, actor and producer) .... Borjamari
- Torrente 3: el protector (2005, actor, writer, director and producer) .... Torrente
- Bienvenido a casa (2006)
- La máquina de bailar (2006) .... Johnny
- Isi & Disi, alto voltaje (2006) .... Isi
- Ekipo Ja (2007) .... Santiago Segura
- Asterix at the Olympic Games (2008) .... Docteurmabus
- Hellboy II: The Golden Army (2008) .... Distinguished Buyer
- Manolete (2008) .... Guillermo
- King Shot (2009)
- Tensión sexual no resuelta (2010) .... Hacker (uncredited)
- The Last Circus (2010) .... Padre-Payaso tonto
- El gran Vázquez (2010) .... Vázquez
- Torrente 4: Lethal Crisis (2011) .... Torrente
- Koma (2011) .... Vendedor
- Jack and Jill (2011) .... Eduardo (uncredited)
- As Luck Would Have It (2011) .... David Solar
- Pa' Habbo (2011)
- El Chef (2012) .... Juan
- Pacific Rim (2013) .... Wizened Man
- Gente en sitios (2013)
- Witching & Bitching (2013) .... Miren
- Torrente V: Operación Eurovegas (2014) .... Torrente
- Pos eso (2014) .... Damián / Obispo / Satán (voice)
- Rey Gitano (2015) .... Conde de Segura
- The Strain (2015, TV Series) .... Evil Boxing Coach
- My Big Night (2015) .... Benítez
- Wild Oats (2016) .... Carlos
- The Queen of Spain (2016) .... Castillo
- Herederos de la bestia (2016)
- Casi leyendas (2017) .... Axel
- You Only Live Once (2017) .... Tobías López
- Los resucitados (2017) .... Don Lorenzo, Conde de Evilio
- Las grietas de Jara (2018) ... Mario Borla
- Sin rodeos (2018)
- Padre no hay más que uno (2019) .... Javier
- Little Red Riding Wolf (2023) .... Pharmacist
- The Night My Dad Saved Christmas 2 (2025)

== Accolades ==
Year	Award	Category	Work	Result	Ref.
1996	10th Goya Awards	Best New Actor	The Day of the Beast	Won	
1999	13th Goya Awards	Best New Director	Torrente, the Dumb Arm of the Law	Won	
