= The Night My Dad Saved Christmas =

- Theatrical release poster
- Spanish: La Navidad en sus manos
- Directed by: Joaquín Mazón
- Screenplay by: Daniel Monedero; Francisco Arnal
- Produced by: Kiko Martínez; María Luisa Gutiérrez; Álvaro Ariza
- Starring: Santiago Segura; Ernesto Sevilla; Unax Hayden; Pablo Chiapella; María Botto; Paulina Dávila; Vadhir Derbez; Joaquín Reyes; Emilio Gavira
- Cinematography: Alfonso Segura
- Edited by: Jani Madrileño
- Music by: Francisco Lorenzo Alonso
- Production companies: La Navidad en sus manos AIE; Nadie es perfecto; Esto también pasará Producciones; Bowfinger International Pictures; SDB Films
- Distributed by: A Contracorriente Films
- Release dates: October 2023 (Seminci); 1 December 2023 (Spain)
- Countries: Spain; Mexico
- Language: Spanish
- Box office: €3.4 million

The Night My Dad Saved Christmas (Spanish: La Navidad en sus manos) is a 2023 Spanish-Mexican Christmas comedy film directed by Joaquín Mazón from a screenplay by Francisco Arnal and Daniel Monedero which stars Santiago Segura and Ernesto Sevilla.

== Plot ==
Before Christmas, Father Christmas is injured in an accident in Madrid, and his hospital roommate, Salva, steps in to replace Santa so he can save Christmas Day and get his family back.

== Cast ==
- Santiago Segura as Papá Noel ('Father Christmas')
- Ernesto Sevilla as Salva
- Unax Hayden as Lucas
- Pablo Chiapella as Rafita
- María Botto as Pilar
- Paulina Dávila as Esther
- Vadhir Derbez as Martín
- Joaquín Reyes
- Emilio Gavira

== Production ==
A Spanish-Mexican co-production, the film was produced by La Navidad en sus manos AIE, Nadie es perfecto, Esto también pasará Producciones and Bowfinger International Pictures alongside SDB Films. It had the association of BTF Media, AF Films and Mogambo, the participation of RTVE, Movistar Plus+, and Crea SGR, and backing from Ayuntamiento de Madrid, the Madrid regional administration, and ICAA.

== Release ==
The film was programmed to have its world premiere in the 'Miniminci' section of the 68th Valladolid International Film Festival. Distributed by A Contracorriente Films, it was released theatrically in Spain on 1 December 2023.

== Reception ==
Enid Román Almansa of Cinemanía rated the film 2½ out of 5 stars, writing in the verdict that the statement "Santiago Segura is Father Christmas" speaks for itself.

Pablo Vázquez of Fotogramas rated the film 3 out of 5 stars, highlighting the honesty that Segura and Sevilla demonstrate at approaching their roles as a positive point, while negatively citing the film's limited appeal to an adult audience.

== Sequel ==
A sequel to the film titled The Night My Dad Saved Christmas 2, directed by Joaquín Mazón with Santiago Segura, Ernesto Sevilla and Unax Hayden reprising their starring roles, will be available on Netflix to stream on 6 December 2025.

== See also ==
- List of Spanish films of 2023
