= El fin de la comedia =

Television series

- Genre: Comedy; Autofiction; Self-parody; Black comedy
- Created by: Ignatius Farray; Miguel Esteban; Raúl Navarro
- Directed by: Miguel Esteban; Raúl Navarro
- Starring: Ignatius Farray
- Country of origin: Spain
- Original language: Spanish
- No. of seasons: 2
- No. of episodes: 12

Production
- Production companies: Comedy Central; Sayaka; Movistar+

Original release
- Network: Comedy Central; Movistar+
- Release: 7 November 2014 – 17 March 2017

El fin de la comedia (transl. 'The End of Comedy') is a Spanish comedy television series starring Ignatius Farray. Its two seasons were originally aired in 2014 and 2017, respectively.

== Premise ==
The plot of the first season follows the life of the comedian Ignatius Farray as a divorced father facing a midlife crisis. In the second season Farray suffers from a life-changing illness. The series makes references to Farray's real-life collaborations in La hora chanante and La vida moderna.

== Cast ==
Starring Ignatius Farray, the series features supporting performances and cameos from the likes of Joaquín Reyes, Juan Cavestany, Marta Fernández Muro, Javier Cansado, Buenafuente, Luis Bermejo, Iñaki Gabilondo, Verónica Forqué, Ernesto Sevilla, Natalia de Molina, Víctor Clavijo, Juanra Bonet, Clara Sanchís, Willy Toledo, Julián Villagrán, Boré Buika, El Chojin, Arkano, Iggy Rubín, Kaco Forns, Lalo Tenorio, Javier Botet, and David Broncano.

== Production and release ==
El fin de la comedia was created by Ignatius Farray, Miguel Esteban and Raúl Navarro. The first season was produced by Comedy Central in collaboration with Sayaka. The episodes were directed by Miguel Esteban and Raúl Navarro. The 6-episode first season premiered on Comedy Central on 7 November 2014. Produced by Comedy Central in collaboration with Movistar+, the second season was released under video-on-demand by Movistar+ in 2017 prior to its airing on Comedy Central.

Series	Episodes	Originally released			Ref.
Series	Episodes	First released	Last released	Network	Ref.
1	6	7 November 2014	21 November 2014	Comedy Central	
2	6	17 March 2017		Movistar+	

=== Season 1 ===
No. overall	No. in season	Title	Original release date
1	1	"Madre murió"	7 November 2014
2	2	"Se puede hacer"	7 November 2014
3	3	"Pica el verde"	14 November 2014
4	4	"El príncipe y la ranita"	14 November 2014
5	5	"Pepinillos agridulces"	21 November 2014
6	6	"Indonesia te necesita"	21 November 2014

=== Season 2 ===
No. overall	No. in season	Title	Original release date
7	1	"El señor Brócoli"	17 March 2017
8	2	"Estampados con arabescos"	17 March 2017
9	3	"¿Vas para El Barranquito o qué?"	17 March 2017
10	4	"El test de Graham"	17 March 2017
11	5	"La policía del karma"	17 March 2017
12	6	"Ignatius Farray"	17 March 2017

== Awards and nominations ==
Year	Award	Category	Nominee(s)	Result	Ref.
2015	3rd MiM Series Awards	Best Comedy Actor	Ignatius Farray	Won	
2018	6th Feroz Awards	Best Comedy Series		Nominated	
2018	46th International Emmy Awards	Best Comedy Series		Nominated	

== See also ==
- Louie (American TV series)
