= Julián López (comedian) =

Spanish comedian and actor (born 1978)

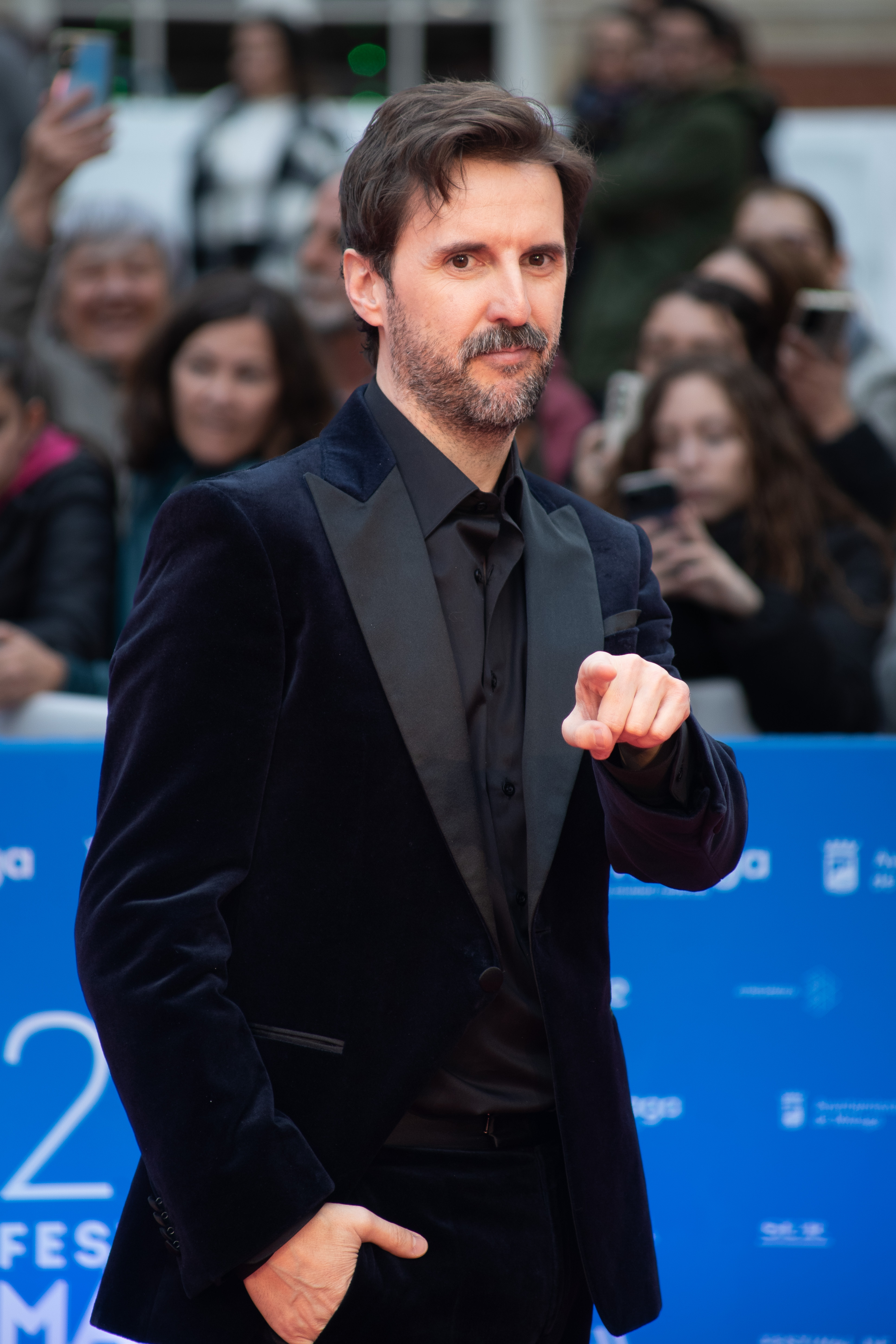
- López in 2024
- Born: Julián López González; 10 November 1978 (age 47); El Provencio, Spain
- Occupations: Comedian; actor

Julián López González (born 10 November 1978) is a Spanish comedian and actor. He became popular for appearances in sketch comedy shows such as La hora chanante and Muchachada Nui.

== Biography ==
Julián López González was born in El Provencio, province of Cuenca, on 10 November 1978. He studied a degree in teaching (specialised in musical education) from the University of Castilla–La Mancha. He earned public recognition in 2002 with the sketch show La hora chanante (2002–2006), alongside Ernesto Sevilla and Joaquín Reyes, on Noche hache on Cuatro and later with Muchachada Nui (2007–2010). He made his feature film debut in Borja Cobeaga's 2009 comedy film Friend Zone.

He hosted the 5th Feroz Awards in 2018.

He has been a committed supporter of the football team Athletic Bilbao since childhood after receiving their kit as a present.

== Filmography ==
=== Film ===
Year	Title	Role	Notes	Ref
2009	Pagafantas (Friend Zone)	Rubén		
2010	Que se mueran los feos (Que se mueran los feos)	Bertín		
2011	No controles (Love Storming)	Juancarlitros		
2011	No lo llames amor... llámalo X (Don't Call It Love… Call It XXX)	Lino		
2014	Torrente 5: Operación Eurovegas	El Cuco		
2015	Perdiendo el norte (Off Course)	Braulio		
2015	El tiempo de los monstruos	Raúl		
2017	Fe de etarras (Bomb Scared)	Pernando		
2018	La tribu (The Tribe)			
2018	Superlópez	Jaime		
2019	Perdiendo el este (Off Course… To China)	Braulio		
2019	Dolor y gloria (Pain and Glory)	Presentador		
2021	Operación Camarón (Undercover Wedding Crashers)	Sebas		
2021	Descarrilados	Roge		
2022	Todos lo hacen	Juan Carlos		
2023	Matusalén	El Alber		
2023	Ocho apellidos marroquís (A Moroccan Affair)	Guillermo López de Castro		
2024	Odio el verano (I Hate Summer)	Calatrava		
2024	Los destellos (Glimmers)	Nacho		
2026	Lapönia (Welcome to Lapland)	Ramón		

=== Television ===
Year	Title	Role	Notes	Ref.
2010–13	Museo Coconut	Emilio Restrepo		
2011	Los Quién	Esteban		
2012–13	Fenómenos	Benito Villar		
2014	Con el culo al aire	Rubén	Introduced in Season 3	
2019–20	Justo antes de Cristo	Manio Sempronio Galva		

== Awards and nominations ==
Year	Award	Category	Nominee(s)	Result	Ref.
2012	67th CEC Medals	Best Supporting Actor	Love Storming	Nominated	
2025	12th Feroz Awards	Best Supporting Actor in a Film	Glimmers	Nominated	
