= Museo Coconut =

- Genre: Sitcom, surreal humour
- Developed by: Hill Valley
- Directed by: Ernesto Sevilla
- Starring: Raúl Cimas; Carlos Areces; Joaquín Reyes; Julián López; Ernesto Sevilla
- Country of origin: Spain
- Original language: Spanish
- No. of seasons: 3
- No. of episodes: 24

Production
- Executive producer: Flipy
- Running time: 25 minutes

Original release
- Network: Neox
- Release: November 1, 2010 – present

Related
- Muchachada Nui; La Hora Chanante

Museo Coconut (English: Coconut Museum) is a Spanish TV sitcom which is aired in Neox since November 1, 2010.

The series revolves around the situations that happen in Coconut Museum, a museum of contemporary art. Jaime Walter (Raúl Cimas) becomes its new director, after failing as head of the MOMA in New York and in his love life. On arrival, he must deal with both the owner of the museum, Mrs. Coconut (Carlos Areces), and with their employees.

== Cast ==
- Raúl Cimas
- Carlos Areces
- Joaquín Reyes
- Julián López
- Ernesto Sevilla
