= The Night My Dad Saved Christmas 2 =

2025 Spanish comedy film

- Teaser poster
- Spanish: La Navidad en sus manos 2
- Directed by: Joaquín Mazón
- Screenplay by: Daniel Monedero; Francisco Arnal
- Produced by: Kiko Martínez; María Luisa Gutiérrez; Álvaro Ariza
- Starring: Santiago Segura; Ernesto Sevilla; Unax Hayden; Pablo Chiapella
- Cinematography: Ángel Iguacel
- Production company: Nadie es perfecto
- Distributed by: Netflix
- Release date: 5 December 2025
- Running time: 94 minutes
- Country: Spain
- Language: Spanish

The Night My Dad Saved Christmas 2 (Spanish: La Navidad en sus manos 2) is a 2025 Spanish Christmas comedy film. It is a sequel to the 2023 film The Night My Dad Saved Christmas, directed by Joaquín Mazón and reprising their starring roles are Santiago Segura, Ernesto Sevilla and Unax Hayden. It is available on Netflix to stream from 5 December 2025.

== Synopsis ==
Set during a chaotic holiday season, the film follows Salva, a reformed thief striving to be a better father, and his teenage son as they attempt to rescue Santa Claus, who has been captured by a rogue toy. With the help of mischievous allies, they have just one night to confront unexpected adversaries and rekindle the spirit of Christmas.

== Cast ==
- Santiago Segura as Santa Claus
- Ernesto Sevilla as Salva
- Unax Hayden as Lucas, Salva's son
- Pablo Chiapella
- Joaquín Reyes
- María Botto as Pilar
- Josema Yuste
- Emilio Gavira

== Production ==
Netflix planned the direct sequel of the original film The Night My Dad Saved Christmas in November 2024, with filming scheduled between late December 2024 and late February 2025 in Madrid.

== Release ==
The original Netflix film The Night My Dad Saved Christmas 2 premiered on 5 December 2025.
