= Pablo Chiapella =

Spanish actor

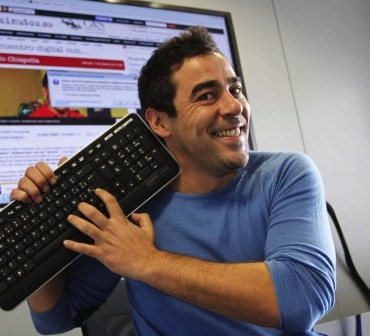
- Chiapella in an interview for 20minutos.es
- Born: Pablo Chiapella Cámara; 1 December 1976 (age 49); Albacete, Spain
- Occupation: Actor
- Height: 1.82 m (5 ft 11 1/2 in)
- Spouse: Natalia
- Children: Valentina (b. 2015)

Pablo Chiapella Cámara (born 1 December 1976), also known as Chape, is a Spanish actor known for his role as Amador Rivas in the television series La que se avecina.

== Biography ==
Chiapella was born and raised in Albacete. After obtaining a diploma in Teaching of Physical Education, he decided to devote his life to performing, which led to a degree in Dramatic Arts.

He has been an actor since 2000, starting with roles on Paramount Comedy. He was the main character of El capitán Sevilla y el Centurión Chape. In 2004 he participated in the stage play Alguien voló sobre el nido del cuco, based on Miloš Forman's eponymous film. He branched out, participating in television series such as Lobos (Wolves) (on Antena 3 in 2004), Telecinco's Hospital Central, TVE's Al filo de la ley ("The Edge of the Law") where he played a lawyer, and Fuera de control ("Out of Control") also of TVE in which he played the journalist "Retu". He also participated in the Telecinco series El comisario ("The Commissioner"), in the chapter entitled Como perro acorralado.

More recently, in 2006, he had an appearance in the final season of Aquí no hay quien viva on Antena 3, playing Alfonso "Moncho" Heredia. Currently, since 2007, he plays Amador in the series La que se Avecina broadcast on Telecinco.

In his career, Chiapella has also participated in a dozen short films such as El arte de la seducción ("The Art of Seduction") in 2002 by Sandra Ruiz or 7º Izquierda ("7 º Left") in 2003 by Carlos Sanz. In 2002 he appeared in his first full feature, La vida mancha ("Life stains") by Enrique Urbizu.

Pablo Chiapella has also been involved in some plays. He was Tenorio in El burlador de Sevilla directed by José Luis Sáez.

He belongs to El cuarteto de Albacete, a group of comedians consisting of himself, Joaquín Reyes, Ernesto Sevilla and Raúl Cimas who starred in La hora chanante.

== Filmography ==
=== Films ===
- Viva la vida (2019) as Juan
- Lobisome (2018) as David
- Viven? (2015)
- Perdona si te llamo amor (2014) as Pedro
- Otro verano (2013) as Cano
- La gran revelación (2007)
- Penalty (2006)
- Life Marks (2003) as Monitor
- The Night My Dad Saved Christmas 2 (2025)

=== Programmes ===
- Hospital central, Telecinco (2004)
- El comisario, Telecinco (2006) as Olmo
- Aquí no hay quien viva, Antena3 (2006) as Moncho Heredia.
- La que se avecina, Telecinco (2007–present) as Amador Rivas.
- Muchachada Nui, La 2 (2007-2010)
- Museo Coconut, Neox (2011) as Josian
- El club de la comedia, La Sexta
- Días sin Luz (2009) as Cónsul
- Fuera de control (2006) as Retu
- Al filo de la ley (2005) as Hugo Estrada
- Lobos (2005) as police man
- La hora chanante (2005-2004) as Bomba/Various Roles
