= Mathusalem =

- Film poster
- Spanish: Matusalén
- Directed by: David Galán Galindo
- Screenplay by: David Galán Galindo; María José Moreno; Fernando Hernández
- Produced by: Enrique Cerezo
- Starring: Julián López; Miren Ibarguren; Antonio Resines; Raúl Cimas; Carlos Areces; Manuel Galiana; Alberto San Juan; Roberto Álamo; Lucía de la Fuente; Elena de Lara; Jason Fernández; Judith Fernández; María Barranco; Adrián Lastra; Enrique Villén; Jorge Sanz; Miguel Rellán
- Cinematography: Jesús Mª Haro
- Edited by: Miguel Ángel Prieto; Pablo Blanco
- Music by: Eric Cunningham; Javier Colmen
- Production companies: Vuelta a la universidad AIE; Enrique Cerezo PC
- Distributed by: Flins y Piniculas
- Release dates: 28 September 2023 (ficmonterrey); 5 April 2024 (Spain)
- Country: Spain
- Language: Spanish

Mathusalem (Spanish: Matusalén) is a 2023 Spanish comedy film directed by David Galán Galindo which stars Julián López and Miren Ibarguren.

== Plot ==
The plot is set in Spain. Alber is a freeloading rapper past his forties whose vital motto is "getting older is inevitable, maturing is optional" living with his grandfather. Upon being ditched by the latter, Alber moves in to his parents' home, where he makes a bet with his father: he should join university and pass all the subjects to stay home. Considered a kid by his parents and a grandpa by his schoolmates, Alber comes across old flame Amaia, now lecturing at the university.

== Cast ==
- Julián López as El Alber / Elpho-K
- Miren Ibarguren as Amaia
- Jason Fernández as Miguel
- Lucía de la Fuente as Laia
- Elena de Lara as Nerea
- Raúl Cimas as Anselmo
- Antonio Resines as Emiliano Olid
- María Barranco as Charo
- Manuel Galiana as Alarico Olid
- Miguel Rellán as decano ('dean')
- Roberto Álamo as Jose Ramón
- Adrián Lastra as Ramón Olid
- Carlos Areces as Reinoso / DJ Kafre
- Alberto San Juan as Kase.O
- Emilio Buale as Gran T
- Enrique Villén as señor Barral / suegro de Anselmo
- Judith Fernández as Elvira
- Alicia Rubio as Pepa
- Alberto Casado as Policía 1
- Rober Bodegas as Policía 2
- Maite Sandoval as Francisca

== Production ==
The helmer described his work as belonging to the 'college comedy' classic genre, with referents such as Animal House, American Pie, Rushmore or 22 Jump Street, while also indebted to the filmography of José Luis Cuerda and Luis García Berlanga, with the film including several nods to Plácido.

Matusalén is a Vuelta a la universidad AIE and Enrique Cerezo PC production, and it had the collaboration of TVE. Shooting locations in Madrid included the Complutense University. The film was lensed by Jesús Haro.

== Release ==
The film made it to slate of the 19th Monterrey Film Festival (ficmonterrey) for its world premiere, screening as the official selection's opening film. It also screened at the 27th Málaga Film Festival in a non-competitive slot on 2 March 2024. Distributed by Flins y Piniculas, it is scheduled to be released theatrically in Spain on 5 April 2024.

== See also ==
- List of Spanish films of 2024
