= María Adánez =

Spanish actress and filmmaker

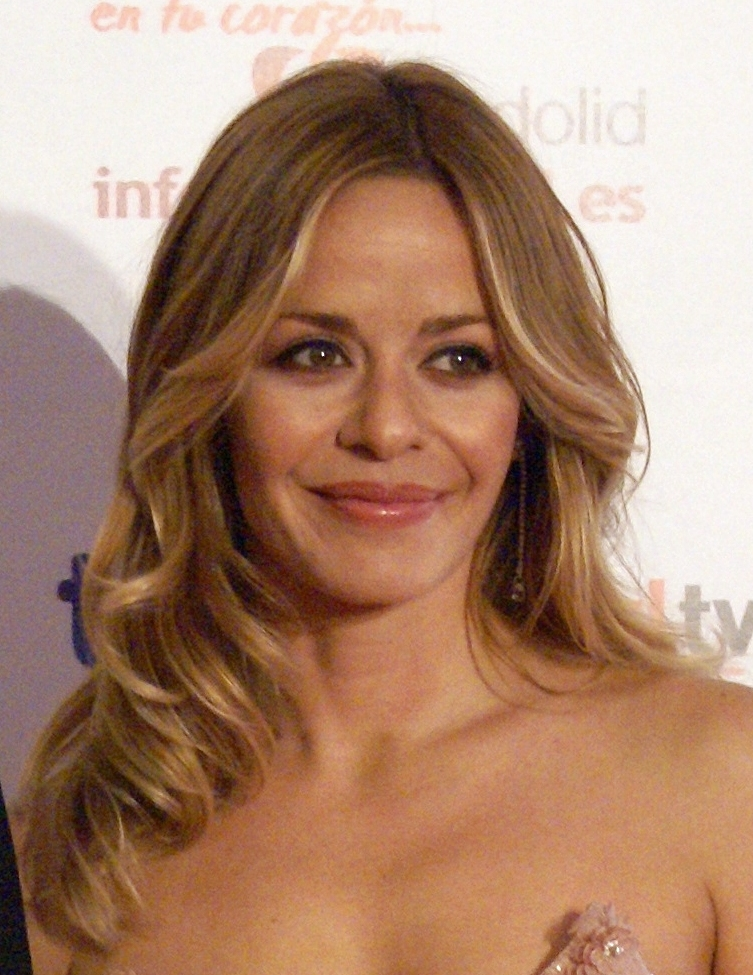
- Adánez at Seminci in 2011
- Born: María Adánez Almenara; 12 March 1976 (age 50); Madrid, Spain
- Occupation: Actress · producer

María Adánez Almenara (12 March 1976) is a Spanish actress, director, writer and producer.

== Career ==
Adánez's most popular works include Pepa y Pepe, Farmacia de guardia, Aquí no hay quien viva, and La que se avecina. She is now filming her first work as writer, director, and producer in 5ºB Escalera Dcha.

=== Television ===
Between 1993 and 1994 Adánez played Maria, Kike's girlfriend, in the Farmacia de guardia series. In 1995 she would be known by the public for the role of Maria in Pepa y Pepe. She also played parts in Menudo es mi padre, Ellas son así, ¡Ay, Señor, Señor!, and Paraíso.

Between September 2003 and February 2006, she starred in the television series Aquí no hay quien viva, where she gave life to her character Lucía Álvarez, a young woman accustomed to having everything easy and having a job in her father's company. This role gave her great popularity and won her a Unión de Actores award for the best television star actress. She would also present the 2003 Campanadas de Fin de Año with her cast-mates Fernando Tejero and José Luis Gil.

In 2007 she premiered the series Círculo rojo, where she played Patricia Villalobos, a 36-year-old girl who created a small company representing artists in Paris, but decides to abandon it because of the mysterious and tragic death of her sister. The show was cancelled in just a few weeks. At the end of 2008, she began starring in the humor series Maitena: Estados alterados, broadcast by La Sexta, interpreting a young matrimonial lawyer who tries to grow as a professional while supporting the problems of her mother, sister and co-workers. After the cancellation of this series, she decided to transition her career towards the theater for a time.

In 2011, she played a role in El secreto de Puente Viejo, playing Elvira de Castro, a woman of high class, who has a deformed child who dies during childbirth, so she steals the protagonist's son. She also performed a monologue in the second season of El club de la comedia.

She has also participated in humanitarian aid programs such as En movimiento..., issued by La 2.

=== Theater ===
She debuted in the theater at 7 years old in the play Casa de muñecas, by Henrik Ibsen, versioned by Ana Diosdado. Later she participated in Los bosques de Nyx (1994) by Miguel Bosé.

Her next two works were comedies, and in both she played the role of a beautiful and naive young woman. In the first, premiered in 2003, she starred, along with Emilio Gutiérrez Caba, in the theatrical version of the film The Sleeping Prince, starring Marilyn Monroe and Laurence Olivier. For this work she received the Ercilla and Larios awards as a revelation actress, was nominated by the Unión de Actores for the best actress in the theater, and was named Actriz Revelación Chivas. The second, premiered a year later, was La tienda de la esquina by Lander Iglesias.

In 2006, with the help of Miguel Narros, she worked on Oscar Wilde's classic Salomé. Later, she worked on Las brujas de Salem (2007) by Arthur Miller, directed by Alberto González Vergel, where she played Abigail Williams, an 18-year-old girl who has to fight to prevent her death and in La señorita Julia. These last two works would be worth three nominations to the Mayte Theater Awards in 2008 and 2009. In 2010 she played in Pierre-Augustin de Beaumarchais, where she played the role of Madmoiselle Ménard, a naive and cheerful girl that becomes the protagonist's lover.

In 2011 she returned to work with Narros in ¡Pero no andes desnuda!, as well as in La escuela de la desobediencia de Luis Luque where she played Fanchon. In 2012, and under the direction of Josep Maria Flotats and in the company of Kira Miró and Aitor Mazo, she premiered in La verdad.

=== Film ===
Adánez began her film career at the age of 6 with Angelino Fons in the film Mar Brava, where she shared the stage with Alfredo Mayo and Jorge Sanz. In 1982 she performed in the movie Loca por el circo and in 1983 in Vivir mañana, El currante and El Crack II. Later, she participated in several films among which are: El rey del mambo, Los peores años de nuestra vida y La ley de la frontera.

As of 1998, she was valued as a promising actress of Spanish cinema, thanks to her participation in Time of Happiness, where she played a young woman who is influenced by the hippie culture of the seventies. A year after, she starred in Antonio del Real's Cha-cha-chá, where she played María.

Very active for the next ten years, in 2009 she appeared in Donald Petrie's Life in Ruins, where she played Lena, a sexy, newly divorced Spanish woman who decides to take a trip to Greece to forget her marriage. The director specifically searched in Spain for two actresses to play two women of the same nationality. At first, the writers were not going to include characters of this nationality, but the actors Javier Bardem or Penélope Cruz made him include them.

In May 2011, she began filming her first job as director, 5ºB Escalera Dcha, where she also works as a producer and scriptwriter. The project was born in 2010 after the death of her father.

== Private life ==
María Adánez is the daughter of the movie makeup artist Paca Almenara (who is married in a second marriage with Santiago Ramos). Her father died in 2010 due to a heart attack. In addition, she has two sisters, one of whom is married to soundman Sergio Burmann. Adánez married the British law graduate David Murphy in June 2010 on a private estate in Binibeca on the island of Menorca. But, after three years of marriage, María Adánez and David Murphy decided by mutual agreement to end their relationship.

== Filmography ==
=== Film ===
- Cabo de vara (1978)
- Loca por el circo (1982)
- Vivir mañana (1983)
- El currante (1983)
- El crack II (1983)
- Mar brava (1983)
- El rey del mambo (1989)
- El vuelo de la paloma (1989)
- Los peores años de nuestra vida (1994)
- La ley de la frontera (1995)
- Corazón loco (1997)
- El tiempo de la felicidad (1997)
- Perdón, perdón (1998)
- Cha-cha-chá (1998)
- El grito en el cielo (1998)
- Entre las piernas (1999)
- Rewind (1999)
- Tiempos de azúcar (2001)
- Todo menos la chica (2002)
- X (2002)
- El lápiz del carpintero (2003)
- Descongélate (2003)
- Tiovivo c. 1950 (2004)
- El Espantatiburones (2004)
- Dot.Com (2007)
- My Life In Ruins (2009)
- Menudas piezas (2024)
- Invasión (2024)

=== Television ===
- Farmacia de guardia (1991)
- Pepa y Pepe (1995)
- Menudo es mi padre (1996)
- Los negocios de mamá (1997)
- Ellas son así (1999)
- Javier ya no vive solo (2002)
- Aquí no hay quien viva (2003–2006)
- Círculo rojo (2007)
- Estados alterados (2008–2010)
- El secreto de Puente Viejo (2011)
- La que se avecina (2013–2016)

== Accolades ==
Year	Award	Category	Work	Result	Ref.
2003	12nd Actors and Actresses Union Awards	Best Stage Actress in a Leading Role	El príncipe y la corista	Nominated	
2005	14th Actors and Actresses Union Awards	Best Television Actress in a Leading Role	Aquí no hay quien viva	Won	
