= Lucía Baquedano =

Spanish writer

- Born: 1938 (age 87–88); Pamplona
- Occupation: Writer
- Years active: Since 1979
- Known for: Children's and young adult literature.
- Notable work: "Fantasmas de día"
- Awards: El Barco de Vapor Awards; Gran Angular Awards

Lucía Baquedano Azcona (December 18, 1938, in Pamplona, Navarre) is a Spanish writer and columnist for the media. Her literary work has received several awards.

== Biography ==
Lucía Baquedano Azcona was born on December 18, 1938, in Pamplona, province of Navarra, Spain. She studied secretarial work and worked for nine years as a secretary until she married and moved to Tarragona. Upon returning to her native Pamplona, she became the mother of 4 children, who have now made her a grandmother.

In 1979, she submitted her novel "Cinco panes de cebada" (Five Barley Loaves) to the Fundación Santamaría's literary awards competition, and was a finalist for the Gran Angular prize, encouraging her to continue writing. In 1981, her novel was published by Editorial SM. It deals with the problems of a young teacher on her arrival at a school in the Pyrenees.

In 1980, she won the second El Barco de Vapor prize for children's literature with "La muñeca que tenía 24 pecas" and again in 1986 with the book "Fantasmas de día". The latter book was included in the IBBY Honor List of 1988 and in the annual bulletin of recommended books of the Jugendbibliothek of Munich. She also received the Almeria Book Fair award for "Me llamo Pipe". In 1993 she received the Spanish Catholic Commission for Childhood Award for "La casa de los diablos", and again in 2002, for "El pueblo sombrío". She has written 20 books.

In 2009, students from the Vázquez de Mella Public Primary School in Pamplona premiered the play Fantasmas de día (Daytime Ghosts) at the Gayarre Theater, a well-known theater in the capital of Navarra.

In addition to her work as a writer, she writes journalistic articles in the media. In Diario de Navarra she writes in the column "La ventana", on current affairs, culture and literature.
