= I Hate Summer (2024 film) =

- Theatrical release poster
- Spanish: Odio el verano
- Directed by: Fer García-Ruiz
- Written by: David Marqués
- Based on: I Hate Summer by Davide Lantieri, Michele Pellegrini, Massimo Venier, and Aldo, Giovanni & Giacomo
- Produced by: Ghislain Barrois; Álvaro Augustin; Miguel Ménendez de Zubillaga
- Starring: Julián López; Kira Miró; Roberto Álamo; Malena Alterio; Jordi Sánchez; María Botto
- Cinematography: Ángel Amorós
- Edited by: Nerea Mugüerza
- Music by: Vanessa Garde
- Production companies: Telecinco Cinema; Mono Pictures AIE
- Distributed by: Sony Pictures Entertainment Iberia
- Release date: 23 August 2024
- Country: Spain
- Language: Spanish

I Hate Summer (Spanish: Odio el verano) is a Spanish comedy film directed by Fer García-Ruiz and written by David Marqués based on the Italian film of the same name. It stars Julián López, Kira Miró, Roberto Álamo, Malena Alterio, Jordi Sánchez, and María Botto.

== Plot ==
Three couples (street sweeper and tarot reader Alonso and Marisa; charcuterie owners Torres and Fátima; and plastic surgeon and influencer Calatrava and Vicky) travel to the Canary Islands to spend their holidays with their broods. They find out that they have booked the same house forcing them to live under the same roof for the rest of their holidays.

== Cast ==
- Roberto Álamo as Alonso
- Jordi Sánchez as Torres
- Julián López as Calatrava
- Malena Alterio as Marisa
- María Botto as Fátima
- Kira Miró as Vicky
- Pilar Castro
- Mariano Venancio
- Javier Lera
- Aitziber Errazkin
- Scarlett Arce
- Lucas Ruiz Barrea
- Diego Ruiz
- Daniel Acebes

== Production ==
The film was produced by Telecinco Cinema and Mono Pictures AIE with the association of Sony Pictures International Productions and the participation of Mediaset España and Mediterráneo Mediaset España Group. It was lensed by Ángel Amorós. Shooting locations included Tenerife and Madrid.

== Release ==
Distributed by Sony Pictures Entertainment Iberia, the film was released theatrically in Spain on 23 August 2024.

== Reception ==
Raquel Hernández Luján of HobbyConsolas gave the film 45 points ('so-so') deeming it to be no more than "a competent, passing distraction".

Fausto Fernández of Fotogramas rated the film 3 out of 5 stars, highlighting the leading sextet as its best while citing its "dubious" selection of songs as a negative point.

== See also ==
- List of Spanish films of 2024
