= If I Were Rich =

If I Were Rich may refer to:

- Cash (1933 film), also known as If I Were Rich, a British comedy
- If I Were Rich (1936 film), a British comedy
- If I Were Rich (2019 film), a Spanish comedy
