= To Hell with the Ugly =

To Hell with the Ugly is the title of several works:

- To Hell with the Ugly (Et on tuera tous les affreux), a 1948 French novel by Boris Vian (under the pen name Vernon Sullivan)
- To Hell with the Ugly, a 2023 French video game adapted from the novel
- To Hell with the Ugly (Que se mueran los feos), a 2010 Spanish film
