= Muchachada Nui =

Spanish television comedy show

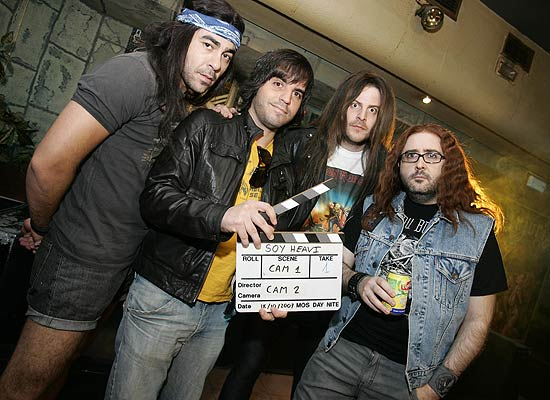
- Pablo Chiapella, Ernesto Sevilla, Raúl Cimas y Carlos Areces in a sketch.
- Genre: Comedy
- Starring: Joaquín Reyes; Ernesto Sevilla; Pablo Chiapella; Julián López; Carlos Areces; Raúl Cimas
- Country of origin: Spain
- Original language: Spanish

Production
- Producers: Flipy and Vicente Haro
- Running time: 30 minutes
- Production company: Televisión Española

Original release
- Network: La 2
- Release: 19 September 2007 – 14 April 2010

Muchachada Nui is a Spanish television comedy show, consisting of unrelated sketches that use absurd and surreal humour. It was broadcast on La 2 of Televisión Española. It is the sequel of La hora Chanante, that first aired on Paramount Comedy (Spain).

== Name ==
Since Paramount Comedy owned the rights of the previous programme, including its name, "La Hora Chanante", a new name was needed.

In a 2007 interview, the cast explained that "Muchachada Nui" is a combination of "muchachada", a common word in their manchego vocabulary meaning "a group of lads", and "nui" from "ojete nui", as in "cuando te pica el ojete porque no te has lavado bien" (when your arsehole itches because you haven't washed it well).

== Cast ==
The same actors that appeared in "La Hora Chanante" appear in "Muchachada Nui". However, their roles are not the same, as a result of the copyright issue. The ones that appear most often are: Julián López, Ernesto Sevilla, Raúl Cimas, Carlos Areces, and the director and creator Joaquín Reyes.

== Format and sections ==
As in "La Hora Chanante", each programme is hosted by an impression of a famous star facing some kind of trouble. This story is divided in parts, and, between them, other sketches are shown. Some of these sections are repeated throughout the weeks, though only "Celebrities" and "Mundo viejuno" are always present. Many of these sections were present in "La Hora Chanante" with a different name.

=== Sections ===
Celebrities: Joaquin Reyes characterises a famous person, and speaks about their life from a humorous point of view, always with a manchego accent. This character introduces the other sections throughout the programme. It is the equivalent of the old "Testimonios" section in "La Hora Chanante".

Mundo viejuno (Elder world, viejuno being a word from their manchego vocabulary): Old movies - generally B movies, such as Mr Wong in Chinatown, with Boris Karloff - are redubbed with a plot that echoes the original one and at the same time takes advantage of the images to create a comic effect. It is the equivalent of the old "Retrospecter" in "La Hora Chanante".

Las aventuras del joven Rappel (The adventures of young Rappel): A parody of the show Smallville, where the main character is Rappel (a famous fortune-teller in Spain) who is in the process of discovering his powers. Rappel is played by Carlos Areces.

Al fresco (A play on words; "Al fresco" means "Outdoors", but "fresco" is also a term for a cheeky person): Marcial Ruiz Escribano (played by Ernesto Sevilla) is a "gañán" (which could be best translated as "redneck") that explains several topics related with rural life. It is the equivalent of "El Gañán" in "La Hora Chanante".

El Bonico del to (Something like "The utterly beautiful"): El Bonico (played by Carlos Areces) is a characters that explains his view points about society. He is a hoity-toity yet conservative man worried about values and aesthetics in present society.

Tú eres el protagonista (You are the protagonist): A parody of a talk show, hosted by Pedro Bonilla (played by Julián Pérez).

El perro muchacho (The dog-boy): Perro Muchacho is a local superhero with a dog-face.

Riken Sproken: A tacky character that thinks about life situations that are soul-depressing.

Gaticos y Monetes (Little Cats and Little Monkeys, monete being a manchego word): The takeouts. It is the equivalent of the old "Hever vs Clever" section in "La Hora Chanante".

=== Cartoon characters ===
Enjuto Mojamuto: A nerd's life experiences and adventures, always concerning the Internet. Created by Joaquin Reyes.

La cinta VHS (The VHS tape): A VHS tape reminiscing about pre-DVD times. Created by Joaquin Reyes.

Los Klamstein (The Klamsteins): The Klamsteins are a family consisting of Frederik Klamstein (the bread-winner), Amy Klamstein (a female gorilla), Angela-Lansbury Klamstein (the daughter), and Junior Klamstein (the son). In an interview, Carlos Areces, the creator of this cartoon, stated that the gorilla was based on the film Congo, and Angela-Lansbury Klamstein on the actress Angela Lansbury.

Loqui and the Loquer Loqui is a teenager groupie having constant mood changes, who talks to 'Man in the mirror' (the man in her bedroom's mirror).

== Characters ==
El hombre asqueroso (The disgusting man): An apparently normal man, who dresses in an elegant and tidy way. However, he has a "disgusting" accent. Played by Julián López.

El espantajo de los melones( The scarecrow of the melons): Previously known as "El loco de las coles" (The cabbage-obsessed man).

El señor McGlor (Mr McGlor): Previously known as Señor Glor (Mr Glor). Played by Antonio Tato.

== Internet ==
La Hora Chanante's videos used to be massively shared through pages such as YouTube, so Muchachada Nui, in an original strategy for a TV show, decided to upload almost all of their sketches to their YouTube channel.

Their website was launched on the 24th of October 2007, where all their sketches can be found. It also has a blog, Enjuto Mojamuto's Twitter account, forums, and displays calls for public participation. Enjuto to Mojamuto's Twitter account has over 252,400 followers (as of 2020).
