= Checkmates (film) =

- Theatrical release poster
- Spanish: Menudas piezas
- Directed by: Nacho G. Velilla
- Screenplay by: David S. Olivas; Marta Sánchez Guillén; Nacho G. Velilla
- Produced by: Ghislain Barrois; Álvaro Augustin; Nacho G. Velilla; Gustavo Ferrada; Nico Matji
- Starring: Alexandra Jiménez; Luis Callejo; Francesc Orella; María Adánez
- Cinematography: Andreu Ortoll
- Edited by: Javier Gil Alonso
- Music by: Juanjo Javierre
- Production companies: Telecinco Cinema; Felicitas Media; Menudas Piezas AIE; Lightbox Animation Studios production
- Distributed by: Paramount Pictures Spain
- Release dates: 3 March 2024 (Málaga); 12 April 2024 (Spain)
- Country: Spain
- Language: Spanish

Checkmates (Spanish: Menudas piezas) is a 2024 Spanish comedy film directed by Nacho García Velilla. Its cast features Alexandra Jiménez, Luis Callejo, Francesc Orella, and María Adánez.

== Plot ==
Upon losing her job at an elite school, social-class-climbing teacher Candela is forced to return to lecture at her former high school in a humble neighborhood of Zaragoza, using chess to help a group of socially-excluded students overcome their problems.

== Cast ==
- Alexandra Jiménez as Candela
- Luis Callejo as Lope
- Francesc Orella as Emilio
- María Adánez as Virginia
- Miguel Rellán as Santiago
- Alain Hernández
- José Manuel Poga
- Rocío Velayos as Luna
- Pablo Louazel as Diego
- Verónica Senra as Iria
- Kiko Bena as Keko
- Tuoxin Qiu as Yao

== Production ==
The film is a Telecinco Cinema, Felicitas Media, Menudas Piezas AIE, and Lightbox Animation Studios production, and it had the participation of Mediaset España, Movistar Plus+, Mediterráneo Mediaset España Group, Aragón TV, Gobierno de Aragón, and Diputación de Zaragoza. The film was shot in Zaragoza and Madrid.

== Release ==
Selected within the non-competitive slate of the 27th Málaga Film Festival's official selection, the film premiered on 3 March 2024. Distributed by Paramount Pictures Spain, it was released theatrically in Spain on 12 April 2024.

== See also ==
- List of Spanish films of 2024
