= Rivales =

Rivales (Rivals), may refer to:

- Rivales (film), a 2008 Spanish film directed by Fernando Colomo
- Rivales (song), a 2017 song by Mexican artists Gloria Trevi and Alejandra Guzmán
