= Martes y Trece =

Spanish comedic group

- Notable work: New Year's Eve specials 1989–1997 (except 1993), A ver, a ver

Comedy career
- Years active: 1978–1997
- Medium: Television, film
- Genres: Parody, surreal humour
- Musical career
- Members: Josema Yuste; Millán Salcedo
- Past members: Fernando Conde

Martes y Trece were a trio (and later, duo) of Spanish comedians whose members were Josema Yuste, Millán Salcedo and Fernando Conde. Their style was characterized by grotesque gags on everyday life and caricatures of famous people. The trio made their first television appearance in 1978 on a program by José María Íñigo, and due to their success they repeated four times. Fernando Conde left the group in 1985 to dedicate himself to the theater, but Josema Yuste and Millán Salcedo continued to act together until 1997.

== Origins ==
Millán and Conde met in the military service in Santander (Cantabria), where they already played brief "performances" among peers. Subsequently, they met Yuste at the School of Dramatic Arts in Madrid and they came with the idea to form a comedy group.

== Career ==
They debuted on the small screen in 1979 in the program Fantástico, hosted by José María Íñigo. During the next two years, they appeared frequently on entertainment shows such as Aplauso.

Narciso Ibáñez Serrador initially selected them to play the role of "Los Tacañones" (The Stingy Ones), an antagonist role for his famous quiz show Un, dos, tres... responda otra vez. They filmed a program, but he later decided to let the role to Las Hermanas Hurtado, still Martes y Trece appeared as comedians in the show.

They were a regular part of the New Year's Eve TV specials on TVE. Performing sketches based on public figures, they generally parodied contemporary television and radio. The most famous was the "patty sketch" of 1985, about a confused mother calling radio host Encarna Sánchez while frying small pies to talk about her two sons and their military service in Móstoles. The lady, never seen on stage, mixed up all the details of her conversation and even said that she was frying the two sons and that Móstoles was on fire. In 1988 they were the hosts of ¡Hola, hola 89!

They continued to make New Year programs, initially written by themselves and directed by Rafael Galan. From 1989 until the group split in 1997 (except in 1993, replaced by Cruz y Raya) they recorded: A por uvas (1989), ¡Venga el 91! (1990), El 92 cava con todo (1991), Martes y 13 en directo (1992), ¡Fíjate! (1994), A Belén pastores (1995), Emisión Imposible (1996) and Adós (1997).

In 1990 they were also the hosts of the Twelve Grapes in Puerta del Sol. However, they also made specials outside New Year's Eve such as A ver, A ver (1991), Que te den concurso (1992) and Vísperas y Festivos (1995).

TVE granted the group their own weekly show, Viéndonos, combining performances with comic sketches. There were 18 episodes. They conducted a surreal interview with Madonna in 1992.

In 1994 they had another, less successful, weekly program El retonno.

== Filmography ==
=== TV programs ===
- 1992 A ver, a ver
- 1993 Que te den concurso
- 1992–1993 Viéndonos
- 1994 El retonno
- 1995 Vísperas y Festivos

==== New Year's Eve specials ====
- 1988 ¡Hola, hola 89!
- 1989 A por uvas
- 1990 ¡Venga el 91!
- 1991 El 92 cava con todo
- 1992 Martes y 13 en directo
- 1994 ¡Fíjate!
- 1995 A Belén pastores
- 1996 Emisión Imposible
- 1997 Adós

=== Films ===
- Ni te cases ni te embarques (1982)
- La loca historia de los tres mosqueteros (1983)
- Aquí huele a muerto… (1990)
- El robobo de la jojoya (1991)
