= Don't Call It Love... Call It XXX =

- Theatrical release poster
- Spanish: No lo llames amor... llámalo X
- Directed by: Oriol Capel
- Screenplay by: David S. Olivas; Oriol Capel; Nacho G. Velilla; Antonio Sánchez
- Produced by: Mercedes Gamero; Nacho G. Velilla
- Starring: Mariano Peña; Adriana Ozores; Javier Gutiérrez; Kira Miró; Julián López; Ana Polvorosa; Javier Mora; Eduardo Gómez; Fernando Otero; Paco León
- Cinematography: Juan Carlos Gómez
- Edited by: Ángel Hernández Zoido
- Music by: Juanjo Javierre
- Production companies: Antena 3 Films; Vértice Films; Producciones Aparte
- Distributed by: Vértice Cine
- Release dates: 27 March 2011 (Málaga); 6 May 2011 (Spain)
- Country: Spain
- Language: Spanish

Don't Call It Love… Call It XXX (Spanish: No lo llames amor... llámalo X) is a 2011 Spanish romantic comedy film directed by Oriol Capel. Its ensemble cast features Mariano Peña, Adriana Ozores, Javier Gutiérrez, Kira Miró, Julián López, Ana Polvorosa, Javier Mora, Eduardo Gómez, Fernando Otero, and Paco León.

== Plot ==
Aging director Pepe Fons decides to shoot a swan song film: a pornographic spoof of the Spanish Civil War, assembling a crew full of pathetic characters. Three love stories come to the surface during the shooting of the film.

== Cast ==
- Mariano Peña as Pepe Fons
- Adriana Ozores as María
- Javier Gutiérrez as Joserra
- Kira Miró as Saray de la Isla
- Julián López as Lino
- Ana Polvorosa as Lourdes
- Javier Mora as Rafa
- Eduardo Gómez as Elorza
- Fernando Otero
- Paco León as Fermín Macho
- Sophie Evans as Tatiana

== Production ==
The film is an Antena 3 Films, Vértice Cine and Producciones Aparte production.

== Release ==
The film screened at the Málaga Film Festival on 27 March 2011. Distributed by Vértice Cine, it was released theatrically in Spain on 6 May 2011. After one week and a half in theatres, it had grossed €0.7 million. By the turn of June, it had passed the €1 million mark.

== Reception ==
Nuria Vidal of Fotogramas rated the film 3 out of 5 stars, positively citing the recreations of popular old movies as a positive point while lamenting the presence of "some facile and unnecessary jokes".

Javier Ocaña of El País pointed at the predominance in the film of a "sea of comicality far from any brilliance".

== See also ==
- List of Spanish films of 2011
