= Círculo rojo =

Spanish television series

- Genre: Thriller
- Directed by: Juanma R. Pachón; Carlos Navarro; Iñaki Peñafiel
- Starring: María Adánez; María Botto; Carmen Maura; Emilio Gutiérrez Caba; Esmeralda Moya; Jesús Noguero; Jorge Bosch; Rafael Rojas; Jaime Blanch
- Country of origin: Spain
- Original language: Spanish
- No. of seasons: 1
- No. of episodes: 16

Production
- Production company: Ida y Vuelta

Original release
- Network: Antena 3
- Release: 7 May – 23 July 2007

Círculo rojo (transl. 'Red Circle') is a Spanish thriller television series that originally aired on Antena 3 in 2007. The cast features María Adánez, María Botto, Carmen Maura, Emilio Gutiérrez Caba, Jaime Blanch, and Jorge Bosch, among others.

== Premise ==
Upon the death of Clara Villalobos (a fashion designer), two former friends, Andrea Onieva and Patricia Villalobos (Clara's sister), meet again after 18 years. They try to shed light on the mystery of Clara's death, finding out on the fly that Clara actually had a double life and had been a victim of rape.

== Cast ==
- María Adánez as Patricia Villalobos.
- María Botto as Andrea Onieva.
- Carmen Maura as Victoria Villalobos.
- Emilio Gutiérrez Caba as Arturo Onieva.
- Jaime Blanch as Jaime Villalobos.
- Jorge Bosch as Esteban Suárez
- Jesús Noguero as Felipe Torrejón.
- Rafael Rojas as César Villalobos.
- Esmeralda Moya as Lucía.
- Paloma Mozo as Clara Villalobos.
- Agustín Galiana es Roberto.
- Nacho López as Julio.
- Marta Calvó as Montse.
- Ángel Hidalgo as Diego.
- Marta Belmonte as Belén.

== Production and release ==
Círculo rojo was produced by Ida y Vuelta (a subsidiary of Boomerang TV). It consisted of 16 episodes, which were directed by Juanma R. Pachón, Carlos Navarro and Iñaki Peñafiel. Goyo Quintana was credited as executive producer. Shooting began on 21 August 2006.

It premiered on 7 May 2007, earning a weak 2,2 million viewers and 12.7% audience share. Moved to the late night slot, the finale aired on 23 July 2007, earning 1,022,000 viewers and a 19.5% audience share. It was the first series to stream on the Antena 3's VOD service.
