= Encarna Sánchez =

Spanish talk show host and commentator

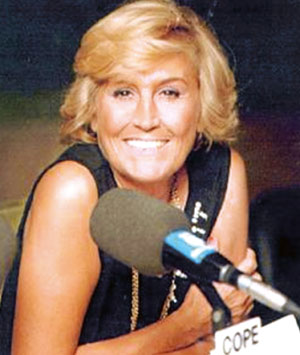
- Born: September 19, 1935; Carboneras, Almería
- Died: April 5, 1996 (aged 60); Spain
- Occupations: Talk radio and current events commentator
- Known for: Thirty years as a talk radio host

Encarna Sánchez (September 19, 1935 – April 5, 1996) was an influential Spanish talk radio host and current events commentator. Generally viewed as a conservative, her views were of great influence on working, middle classes and ruling Governments in Spain at that time. She was well known for her coverage of political scandals, such as those surrounding the collapse of Felipe González's government in 1996. She won three Ondas Awards, an annual recognition given in Spain to major media personalities and shows.

Nevertheless, her show was not explicitly political, and concerned itself with general issues relevant to the Spanish public. Her subject matter could be roughly compared to that of The Oprah Winfrey Show, though Sánchez particularly emphasized social issues. She is known for keeping in touch with her listeners’ daily problems through the show's long call-in segments.

== Style ==
Her style was aggressive at times, more subdued and sympathetic in interviews. When she first appeared on radio, her powerful, slightly hoarse voice assisted her in drawing casual listeners surfing the airwaves. At the height of her popularity, she dominated the early evening timeslot, with ratings comparable to morning host Luis del Olmo, and midnight sports host José María García, of Supergarcia fame. Like García, but unlike del Olmo, she had many prominent enemies on whom she dealt especially strong criticism. Some were famous entertainment personalities, such as TV hosts whose shows she found distasteful. Others were important politicians whom she felt to be corrupt.

== Life and radio shows ==
Encarna, the youngest of five siblings, was born in the little town of Carboneras, Almería on the Southeastern coast of Spain where a small square a few metres from the beach is named after her. She was only a few months old when her father, a Republican military official, was killed as he did not join the fascist uprising.

When Encarna was 14 she used to meet her boyfriend after school. He worked for a local radio station in Almería and one day she was given the opportunity to sub for the regular host, a woman who was ill at the time. The show editor, who also happened to be the station manager, was impressed and offered her first contract.

She was immediately enamored with the world of radio broadcasting. The following year she moved to Madrid to pursue a career as a radio host in the Radio Juventud Network which has a training school there. In her own words Encarna said that she 'passed in one year the required courses which would usually take five'.

As a professional she worked for Radio Juventud and Radio España, in Madrid, and then she was in charge of marketing at a San Sebastián radio station, in the Basque Country of Northern Spain.

Back in Madrid she began to be a well-known voice with nightly shows such as Esto es España, Señores (This is Spain, gentlemen), CS y buen Viaje (CS and good trip – CS being the show sponsor) and La noche vista por mí (The night as seen by me).

In 1970, Encarna accepted a contract in Mexico and later worked for stations in the Dominican Republic and Los Angeles while she was studying radio production for the ABC network. She married a company manager in Los Angeles, but they divorced after three years.

She returned to Spain in 1978, where she became a "national celebrity" in that year after beginning to host Encarna de noche (Encarna at night) in Radio Miramar, Barcelona.

She signed with COPE in September 1983, staying with the network until her death. There, from October 1984, she hosted Directamente Encarna (Directly Encarna) in the early evenings. The program remained on air until her death in 1996.

During the last four years of her life, she faced lung cancer. For some months she flew daily to Switzerland for treatment in the morning to be at her desk in Madrid at 4 p.m. for the millions who had made it into a habit to tune into COPE to listen to the four-hour show.

Once she started to fail to host more and more shows, speculation about her health began to spread in early 1996. In her last months, she sometimes called up the show still being aired by COPE, in part because not even the managers knew exactly how serious her condition was and partly because of the great amount of revenue in sponsorship the show attracted even without her. In one of these calls, she referred to her disease as that 'little ailment for which the doctor has advised a few days rest'. She said to the 'millions of friends' that had encouraged her that 'the sound radio has been for me, and will continue to be, the shortest way to understand the road to friendship and, above all the road to loyalty... Now, I am here ...You will smile again soon. You'll come to meet me again. Soon I will be able to say with all the courage in the world: tremble, bunch of crooks!!'.

Encarna Sánchez died of lung cancer on April 5, 1996.

== Controversies ==
In her lifetime, one of the controversies surrounded Martes y Trece, one of the most famous comedians in Spain. The best known sketch of the duo was about a confused mum, calling Encarna's nightly show while frying small pies to talk about her two sons and their military service in Móstoles, a suburban town near Madrid. The sketch evolved into complete confusion when the lady, who is never seen on stage, mixed up all the details of her conversation and even said that she was frying the two sons and that Móstoles was on fire. The sketch basically ridiculed working-class women in trouble to make their point in the short span of the phone call, the so-called 'marujas' in Spain, who made up much of Encarna's audience. The problem came a few years afterwards when the subject of ridicule was not the audience but Encarna herself and her close friend, famous folk singer Isabel Pantoja. In the new sketch, one of many in their show, Martes y Trece seemed to suggest, though in a very unclear way, an intimate relation between the two women. From then on Encarna's comments towards the comedians turned into periods of silence and others of harsh criticism.
