= Nacho García Velilla =

Spanish film director, screenwriter, and film producer

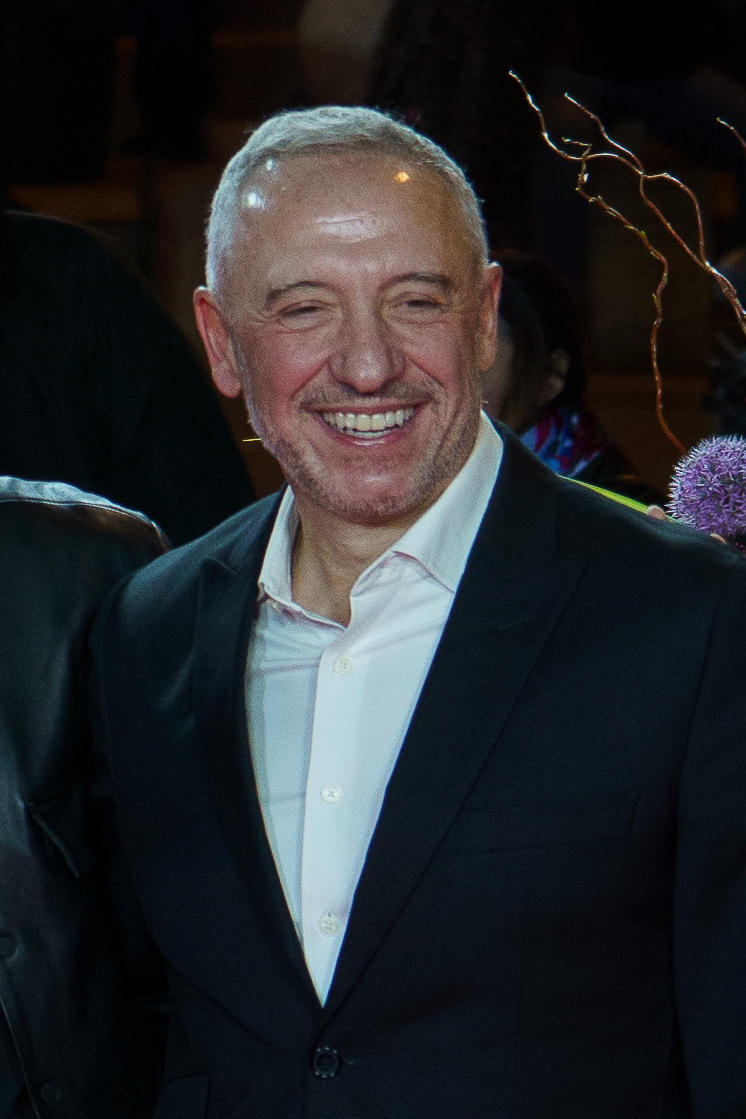
- García Velilla in 2025
- Born: Ignacio García Velilla; September 24, 1967 (age 58); Zaragoza, Spain
- Other names: Nacho G. Velilla
- Occupations: Director, Screenwriter, Producer
- Years active: 1997–present

Ignacio García Velilla (born September 24, 1967) is a Spanish film director, screenwriter, and film producer who has worked in both television and film since 1997.

== Biography ==
He studied Information Sciences at the University of the Basque Country, spent an academic year as part of the Erasmus program at the University of Coventry (United Kingdom), choosing subjects such as Film and Television. He also pursued doctoral studies at the Complutense University of Madrid. Before starting to work in television, he made several music videos, the documentary Visiones artísticas para el fin del milenio, and worked as a journalist at El Heraldo de Aragón and also at Antena 3.

In 1997, he began working for Globomedia as a writer for the series Médico de familia. Later, he also worked as a writer, director, and executive producer of 7 vidas. After the end of this series, he was the co-creator and director of the first Spanish television spin-off, Aída, in 2005. He also worked as an executive producer on the show.

In November 2007, he premiered Gominolas on Cuatro, where he served as script coordinator, director, and executive producer during the 7 episodes the series lasted.

Following the success of his first feature film, Chef's Special (2008), he left Globomedia in 2009 to focus on cinema. In April 2010, he premiered his second film, Que se mueran los feos.

== Filmography ==
As a director, Nacho Velilla has worked in both film and television, moving away from the latter in 2009 to focus entirely on the big screen. He would return to television in 2011.

=== Television ===
- 7 vidas (204 episodes, 1999–2006)
- Aída (237 episodes, 2005–2014)
- Gominolas (8 episodes, 2007)
- Los Quién (13 episodes, 2011)
- Fenómenos (9 episodes, 2012–2013)
- Anclados (8 episodes, 2015)
- Buscando el norte (8 episodes, 2016)

=== Film ===
- Chef's Special (2008)
- Que se mueran los feos (2010)
- Perdiendo el norte (2015)
- Villaviciosa de al lado (2016)
- No manches Frida (2016)
- No manches Frida 2 (2019)
- Por los pelos (2022)
- Mañana es hoy (2022)
- Menudas piezas (2024)
- Don't Call It Love… Call It XXX (2011)
