= Josema Yuste =

Spanish actor, comedian and presenter

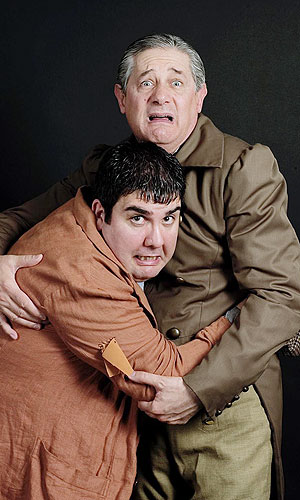
- Yuste (right) and Florentino Fernández, the starring duo of the play Una pareja de miedo
- Born: José Mariano Yuste García de los Ríos
- Height: 1.83 m (6 ft 0 in)
- Children: Ana Yuste

José Mariano Yuste García de los Ríos, better known as Josema Yuste (born March 2, 1954, in Madrid), is a Spanish actor, comedian and presenter.

== Biography ==
In 1976, he met Millán Salcedo and Fernando Conde at the Real Escuela Superior de Arte Dramático, where the idea of forming the trio Martes y Trece emerged, which was realized in 1979. Fernando Conde later left the group, leaving Josema and Millán as a duo. He has participated in Spanish cinema, with various film works.

In 1988, he co-hosted the New Year's Eve gala and the countdown on La 1 of Televisión Española (TVE) alongside Millán Salcedo. Between 1989 and 1997, they hosted the New Year's Eve special on the same channel, leading in audience ratings. The only exception was in 1993 when they were replaced by Los Morancos—the duo Cruz y Raya hosted the subsequent gala—after Josema and Millán's resignation.

He has also played roles in theater. On television, he worked on the series Todos los hombres sois iguales, a comedy aired by Telecinco based on the film of the same name, where he plays a divorced man living with two other divorced friends, and in the series Mediterráneo.

In 1992, he lent his voice to the character of the Genie in the Spanish dub of the Disney movie Aladdin. In 2002, he collaborated again with the company to voice B.E.N. in the movie Treasure Planet.

In 2003, he voiced another character in a new Disney classic, Brother Bear (Hermano Oso), specifically one of the charismatic moose brothers named Tuke. The other is dubbed by his colleague José Mota.

On February 18, 2004, the gala 'El Camino de Santiago, calle mayor de Europa' was recorded by Televisión Española at the Teatro Principal de Burgos, which was broadcast by the first channel of that station on April 13 of that year. Its presenters were Anne Igartiburu and Josema Yuste.

In 2007, he presented Por fin has llegado, on TVE, a humor program based on improvisation.

In 2008, he worked with Florentino Fernández on the play Una pareja de miedo, an adaptation of the play El misterio de Ira Vamp, and also on the Christmas Eve special of 2008 that aired on La 1 of Televisión Española. On April 16, 2009, the two comedians premiered the weekly program ¿Y ahora qué?.

He has a daughter and two sons, the youngest of whom is 27 years old, named Jaime.

He was part of the comedy duo Josema y Flo. In the 2011-12 season, he competed on the program Tu cara me suena on Antena 3.

On December 24, 2011, he hosted the Christmas Eve special Nochegüena News on TVE. He played Asun in the program Señoras que... (Antena 3). On December 31, 2012, he hosted the New Year's Eve special Hotel 13 estrellas, 12 uvas.

In 2019, he participated in the New Year's Eve special organized by José Mota, where he appeared alongside his former "Martes y Trece" partner, Millán Salcedo.

== Filmography ==
- Sentados al borde de la mañana, con los pies colgando (released on January 19, 1979).
- Cocaína (1980)
- Ni te cases ni te embarques (1982).
- La loca historia de los tres mosqueteros (1983).
- La corte de Faraón (1985).
- Aquí huele a muerto (1989).
- El robobo de la jojoya (1991).
- Aladdin (1992)
- Adiós, tiburón (1996).
- Atraco a las 3... y media (2003).
- El asombroso mundo de Borjamari y Pocholo (2004).
- Ciudadano Kien (2007).
- El Reino de los chiflados (2009).
- La venganza de Ira Vamp (2010).
- Pos eso (2014).
- de risa (2016).
- The Night My Dad Saved Christmas 2 (2025)

== Television career ==
- El mejor (2023) - Judge
- 25 palabras (2022-2023) - Guest
- Mi casa es la tuya (2016) - Guest with Millán Salcedo (Martes y Trece)
- La que se avecina (2014) (Cameo) Alejandro Echevarría - December 8, 2014
- El pueblo más divertido (2014)
- Me resbala (2013-2014)
- Tu cara más solidaria (2013)
  - 1st gala: Francisco
- Hotel 13 estrellas, 12 uvas (2012)
- Señoras que... (2012)
- Dando la nota (2012)
- ¡Arriba ese ánimo! (2012)
- Nochegüena News (2011)
- Tu cara me suena (2011-2013)
  - 1st gala: Miguel Bosé (38 points) Third.
  - 2nd gala: Georgie Dann (34 points) Sixth.
  - 3rd gala: John Lennon (24 points) Loser.
  - 4th gala: Joan Manuel Serrat (40 points) Fifth.
  - 5th gala: Luis Aguilé (44 points) Fourth.
  - 6th gala: Ana Torroja (Mecano) (65 points) Winner.
  - 7th gala: Miguel Ríos (37 points) Fifth.
  - 8th gala: José Luis Rodríguez "El Puma" (37 points) Sixth.
  - 9th gala: Betty Missiego (42 points) Third.
  - Final: Carlos Baute with Carolina Ferre portraying Marta Sánchez.
  - Christmas Special: Manuel de la Calva (Dúo Dinámico) alongside Santiago Segura (Ramón Arcusa) (42 points) Third.
  - Tu cara más solidaria 1: Francisco
- En clave de Ja (2010)
- ¿Y ahora qué? (2009)
- Por fin has llegado (2007-2008)
- Ciudadano Kien (2007) - José Mota's New Year's Eve special.
- Juicio al 2006 (2006) - New Year's Eve special by Cruz y Raya.
- Sábado noche (2006)
- La televisión cumple contigo (2006)
- 2005... Repaso al futuro (2005) - New Year's Eve special by Cruz y Raya.
- Érase una vez... 2004 (2004) - New Year's Eve special by Cruz y Raya.
- Juan y José.show (2004)
  - October 29, 2004:
- Paraíso (Cameo)
  - July 17, 2003
- Agente 700 (2001)
- La noche de los errores (2000-2002)
- Gala Unicef 2000 "Como Están Ustedes" (2000)
- Telepasión española (1990, 1993, and 2000)
- El marqués de Sotoancho (2000)
- Mediterráneo (1999-2000)
- Burladero, El (2000)
- Todos los hombres sois iguales (1996-1998)
- Adós (1997)
- Emisión: Imposible (1996)
- A Belén pastores (1995)
- Vísperas y Festivos (1995)
- El retonno (1994)
- Viéndonos (1992-1993)
- Que te den concurso (1992)
- 92 cava con todo, El (1991)
- A ver, a ver (1991)
- ¡Venga el 91! (1990)
- A por uvas (1989)
- Un, dos, tres... responda otra vez
  - Drácula (1984) .... Conde Rácula
  - Las Vegas (1982)
  - Las mil y una noches (1982)
- Aplauso (1980)
- Martes y Trece (1978-1997)

== Theater career ==
- Hair
- Gospel
- Contacto Peculiar
- Un hombre solo
- Nadie es perfecto (2004)
- Una Pareja de Miedo: El Misterio de Ira Vamp (2008)
- La cena de los idiotas (2010)
- Taxi (2016)
- Sé infiel y no mires con quien (2019)
- El aguafiestas (2022)
- Que Dios nos pille confesados (2023)
