= Juan Muñoz (writer) =

Spanish writer and teacher (1929–2023)

Juan Muñoz Martín (13 May 1929 – 27 February 2023) was a Spanish writer and teacher, known for his contributions to Spanish children's literature, most notably the best-selling El pirata Garrapata and Fray Perico book series.

Juan Muñoz Martín was born in Madrid on 13 May 1929. After leaving a seminary at age 17, he studied French philology at the University of Madrid. He worked for the Instituto de Previsión. A resident of the Cuatro Caminos neighborhood, Muñoz worked as a literature teacher at the Jamer Institution in Madrid for four decades. He earned great success in 1979 with his book Fray Perico y su borrico. It was followed by Fray Perico en la guerra (1989), Fray Perico, Calcetín y el guerrillero Martín (1994), Fray Perico en la paz (1996), Nuevas aventuras de fray Perico (1996), Fray Perico y Monpetit (1998), Fray Perico y la primavera (2003), Fray Perico y la Navidad (2003) and Fray Perico de la Mancha (2005).

Likewise, the seminal work of El pirata Garrapata book series, published in 1982, was followed by 15 new works following the character's adventures.

His most famous books were Fray Perico y su borrico (with 71 editions) and El pirata Garrapata (with 64 editions). By the time of his death, they still ranked as the top-selling titles of El Barco de Vapor collection. His swan song is El pirata Garrapata en Marte, presented in 2021. He was bestowed with the Gold Medal of Merit in the Fine Arts in 2021.

Muñoz Martin died on 27 February 2023, at the age of 93.
