= Ghost Graduation =

2012 film by Javier Ruiz Caldera

- Theatrical release poster
- Spanish: Promoción fantasma
- Directed by: Javier Ruiz Caldera
- Written by: Cristóbal Garrido; Adolfo Valor
- Produced by: Francisco Sánchez Ortiz; Simón de Santiago; Eneko Lizarraga; Fernando Bovaira; Edmon Roch; Sandra Hermida
- Starring: Raúl Arévalo; Alexandra Jiménez; Javier Bódalo; Anna Castillo; Andrea Duro; Aura Garrido; Álex Maruny; Jaime Olías; Carlos Areces; Silvia Abril; Joaquín Reyes; Elena Irureta; Luis Varela
- Cinematography: Arnau Valls
- Edited by: Alberto de Toro
- Music by: Javier Rodero
- Production companies: Ciudadano Ciskul; MOD Producciones; Think Studio; Ikiru Films
- Distributed by: Hispano Fox Film
- Release date: 3 February 2012 (Spain)
- Running time: 88 minutes
- Country: Spain
- Language: Spanish
- Box office: $2.6 million

Ghost Graduation (Spanish: Promoción fantasma) is a 2012 Spanish fantasy-comedy film directed by Javier Ruiz Caldera.

== Plot ==
Modesto is a teacher who sees dead people, which has cost him both much money on psychiatrists and the firing from every school he has worked in. His luck changes when he is hired in Monforte and has to teach five students who have turned a prestigious school into a house of horrors. Modesto must get them to pass their pending subject and leave the school once and for all, but it will be no easy task: all five students died twenty years earlier.

Years in the past, Modesto was at his high school dance when he started dancing with another student. When the other students began laughing at him it was revealed that he was dancing with a ghost that only he could see.

Now in the present, Modesto is suffering due to his inability to distinguish ghosts from regular people, and he's fired from his seventh teaching job. He's also been continuously seeing a therapist who inappropriately labels his problems as repressed homosexual feelings. Elsewhere at the Monforte school, teachers are harassed by five deceased students, and their actions threaten to shut down the school. Desperately, Principal Tina hires Modesto because of the several schools he's taught at for years of experience. On his way to his new classroom, Modesto is misdirected and finds an abandoned room with five ghost students. While they initially try to scare him away they finally realize that Modesto can see and communicate with them. Modesto leaves the school because he thinks he's going crazy, but the principal convinces him that she believes him and urges him to rid the school of the ghosts.

Modesto consults a ghost that he often sees at his therapist's office who explains how all ghosts have unfinished business. Modesto concludes that all of the students need to graduate and with some reluctance, all of the students study and pass their exams. However, when the students don't ascend after passing their exams they turn their back on Modesto and continue terrorizing the school once again. Modesto is dismissed from the school once his students start to wreak havoc and the principal loses faith in him.

Dani, the most rebellious of the students wants to continue having fun at the expense of the students and teachers at the school. He also has the ability to possess people. It's revealed that Dani started the fire in an attempt to get all five students out of detention before they died in 1987. He fears his actions will send him to a bad place after he moves on from his ghost phase. He is eventually forgiven by his friends though.

Mariví's boyfriend, Chema, wrote a letter but it was accidentally put in Angela's locker. Angela, kept the letter to get back at Mariví but was eventually compelled to give her back her letter. Mariví's boyfriend wrote to her that he didn't want to get married, that he wasn't sure the child was his, and that Mariví should forget him. Founder's Day, a celebration of Principal Tina's father who was the former principal arrives. The chair lady has yet to determine if she will shut down the school or not attend. While there, Angela possesses a student and begins to sing beautifully. She ascends, since in life she was never allowed to join the choir because her parents didn't want her to divide her time with studying.

Jorge starts chatting with a living student named Elsa with Ouiji boards and computers. She decides she wants to join him in the afterlife so she tries to drown herself in the pool the night of Founder's Day. She briefly sees Jorge before Modesto successfully performs CPR and revives her.

Pinfloy, an avid Pink Floyd fan who died drunk and is always experiencing side effects such as nausea and trouble concentrating, only wanted to travel to Pacha. Modesto and the other students bring him to the school's party and Pinfloy interprets it as Pacha and is able to enjoy his last wish. He eventually has a hangover while Mariví starts to feel labor pains which indicates a new passage of time for them. They all hold hands and ascend into the next part of the afterlife.

== Cast ==
- Raúl Arévalo as Modesto
- Alexandra Jiménez as Tina
- Javier Bódalo as Pinfloy
- Anna Castillo as Ángela
- Andrea Duro as Mariví
- Aura Garrido as Elsa
- Álex Maruny as Dani
- Jaime Olías as Jorge
- Carlos Areces as Otegui
- Silvia Abril as Manuela
- Luis Varela as dead psychiatrist
- Joaquín Reyes as living psychiatrist
