= I Can Quit Whenever I Want (2019 film) =

- Poster
- Spanish: Lo dejo cuando quiera
- Directed by: Carlos Therón
- Screenplay by: Cristóbal Garrido; Adolfo Valor
- Based on: I Can Quit Whenever I Want by Valerio Attanasio, Andrea Garello and Sydney Sibilia
- Produced by: Ghislain Barrois; Álvaro Augustin; Fernando Bovaira; Urko Errazquin
- Starring: David Verdaguer; Ernesto Sevilla; Carlos Santos; Cristina Castaño; Miren Ibarguren; Amaia Salamanca; Ernesto Alterio
- Cinematography: Ángel Iguacel
- Edited by: Alberto de Toro
- Music by: Claudia Montero
- Production companies: Telecinco Cinema; MOD Producciones
- Distributed by: Sony Pictures Entertainment Iberia
- Release date: 12 April 2019
- Country: Spain
- Language: Spanish
- Box office: c. 11 million €

I Can Quit Whenever I Want (Spanish: Lo dejo cuando quiera) is a 2019 Spanish crime comedy film directed by Carlos Therón starring David Verdaguer, Ernesto Sevilla and Carlos Santos. It is a remake of the 2014 Italian film of the same name.

== Plot ==
Pedro, Arturo and Eligio are three university lecturers who are fired from their jobs. Teaming up with Anabel (a lawyer turned gas station employee) and Jota (a wayward student), they find a new niche as producers and sellers of a drug originally developed by Pedro as a vitamin complex as part of a research project.

== Cast ==
- David Verdaguer as Pedro
- Ernesto Sevilla as Arturo
- Carlos Santos as Eligio
- Miren Ibarguren as Anabel
- Cristina Castaño es Isa
- Mero González as Jota
- Amaia Salamanca as Gloria
- Ernesto Alterio as Tacho
- Pedro Casablanc
- Gracia Olayo
- Luis Varela

== Production ==
A remake of the 2014 Italian film I Can Quit Whenever I Want (original title: Smetto quando voglio), the adapted screenplay was penned by Cristóbal Garrido and Adolfo Valor. Carlos Therón was the director. Other crew members include Claudia Montero (music), Ángel Iguácel (cinematography) and Alberto de Toro (editing). The film is a Telecinco Cinema and MOD Producciones production and it had the participation of Mediaset España and Movistar+. The film was shot in the Summer of 2018 in Madrid.

== Release ==
Distributed by Sony Pictures Entertainment Iberia, the film was theatrically released in Spain on 12 April 2019. The film was a box office hit in Spain, grossing over 11 million € and 1.8 million ticket sales.

== Reception ==
Manu Piñón of Fotogramas rated the film with 3 out of 5 stars, considering that all actors know what they are doing.

Javier Ocaña of El País considered the film to be a farce with parodic elements, very well acted, effective in the physical humour and with great punch lines.

Raquel Hernández Luján of HobbyConsolas gave it 60 out of 100 points, deeming it to be an "uneven and somewhat stale comedy", praising the performances of Cristina Castaño, Miren Ibarguren and Ernesto Alterio, while negatively assessing that the lead trio of Verdaguer, Sevilla and Santos are neither charismatic nor funny.

== Accolades ==
Year	Award	Category	Nominee(s)	Result	Ref.
2020	7th Feroz Awards	Best Comedy Film		Nominated	

== See also ==
- List of Spanish films of 2019
