= Comedy Central (Spain) =

- Country: Spain
- Broadcast area: Spain; Andorra; Equatorial Guinea
- Network: Comedy Central
- Headquarters: Madrid

Programming
- Language: Spanish
- Picture format: 1080i (HDTV); 576i (SDTV)

Ownership
- Owner: Skydance Europe
- Sister channels: MTV Global; Nickelodeon; Nick Jr.

History
- Launched: 1 March 1999
- Former names: Paramount Comedy (1 March 1999-13 May 2014)

Comedy Central is a Spanish pay television channel owned by Skydance Corporation under its Skydance Europe division.

Comedy Central in Spain was launched on 1 March 1999. Like the British version of Comedy Central, the channel originally used the name Paramount Comedy and only broadcast from 7PM to 7AM, due to sharing its signal with Nickelodeon, but later on 1 February 2005 both channel gained independent signals. It broadcasts a mixture of comedy series (both Spanish and international) and original programming with Spanish comedians.

The original programming is produced under the umbrella of the Nuevos Cómicos (new comedians) program. The original Nuevos Cómicos program is a stand up comedy program, whose comedians also make theater performance tours since 2001. Some of them are Joaquín Reyes, Carlos Clavijo, Alejandro Angelini, Belén Rubio, Ernesto Sevilla, Diego Wainstein, Micky McPhantom, Juan Diego Martín, Raúl Cimas, Carlos Ramos, Ignatius, Don Mauro, Ricardo Castella, Alex O´Dogherty, Julián López, Dani Mateo, Sandra Marchena, Velilla Valbuena and Ángel Martín.

Other programs developed from comedians who started in Nuevos Cómicos are the sketch program La hora Chanante and late night shows Noche sin tregua and Nada Que Perder.

On 1 September 2009, the channel got a new logo, similar to the one used by Comedy Central in the 2000s although the channel still retained the Paramount Comedy name. On 14 May 2014 the channel was rebranded, and finally adopted the Comedy Central name.

== Programming ==
=== Current programming ===
- Aída
- Aquí no hay quien viva
- Beavis and Butt-Head
- Camera Café
- Central de Cómicos Express
- Dragon Ball
- inspector hamster
- Futurama
- La que se avecina
- Malcolm in the Middle
- Roast Battle
- South Park
- Star Trek: Lower Decks

=== Upcoming programming ===
- Krapopolis
- Ugly Americans
- Universal Basic Guys
- Drawn Together
- The Daily Show
- Grimsburg
- Beavis and Butt-Head Do the Universe
- Instant Mom

=== Former programming ===
- 7 vidas
- 30 Rock
- Accidentally On Purpose
- Ana y los 7
- Anger Management
- Becker
- Being Erica
- Bored to Death
- Breaking Bad
- Brooklyn Nine-Nine
- Central de Cómicos
- Cheers
- Compañeros
- The Cosby Show
- Cuéntame cómo pasó
- Cybill
- Dinamita
- Dream On
- Duncanville
- Ed
- El show de Flo
- Ellen
- F Is for Family
- Family Guy
- Family Matters
- The Fresh Prince of Bel-Air
- Friends
- Glory Daze
- The Golden Girls
- HouseBroken
- Javier ya no vive solo
- La Hora Chanante
- La noche... con Fuentes y cía
- jungle junction
- Life's too short
- Mad About You
- Married... with Children
- Médico de Familia
- Men at Work
- Moncloa, ¿dígame?
- Northern Exposure
- Nuevos Cómicos
- One Piece
- Periodistas
- Plats bruts
- Raising Dad
- Reno 911!
- Roseanne
- Royal Pains
- Rules of Engagement
- Sabrina the Teenage Witch
- Sports Night
- Taxi
- Telecompring
- That '70s Show
- United States of Tara
- Whitney

== Roasts ==
In May 2014, when Paramount Comedy was rebranded Comedy Central the first televised roast in Spain was broadcast. The roast was recorded one month earlier in the Teatro Calderón theatre in Madrid. El Terrat produced the two roasts made to this date

Roastee	Roast master(s)	Original release date	ES viewers (millions)
Santiago Segura	Alex O'Dogherty	14 May 2014	-
Roasters: El Gran Wyoming, Anna Simón, Angy Fernández, Kiko Rivera, Alex de la Iglesia, Silvia Abril, Carlos Areces and Jorge Sanz
El Gran Wyoming	Andreu Buenafuente	12 July 2015	-
Roasters: Pablo Carbonell, Loles León, Arturo Valls, Yolanda Ramos, Falete, Antonio Castelo and Santiago Segura Raimundo Amador and the roastee himself made a musical number
José Mota	Anabel Alonso	24 February 2019	-
Roasters: Ignatius Farray, Marta González de Vega, Luis Piedrahita, Miguel Ángel Revilla, Josema Yuste, and Santiago Segura
