= Extraterrestrial (2011 film) =

- Theatrical release poster
- Spanish: Extraterrestre
- Directed by: Nacho Vigalondo
- Written by: Nacho Vigalondo
- Produced by: Nahikari Ipiña; Nacho Vigalondo
- Starring: Michelle Jenner; Carlos Areces; Julián Villagrán; Raúl Cimas; Miguel Noguera
- Cinematography: Jon D. Domínguez
- Edited by: Jon D. Domínguez
- Music by: Jorge Magaz
- Production companies: Sayaka Producciones; Apaches Entertainment; Antena 3 Films
- Distributed by: Vértigo Films
- Release dates: 11 September 2011 (TIFF); 23 March 2012 (Spain)
- Country: Spain
- Language: Spanish

Extraterrestrial (Spanish: Extraterrestre) is a 2011 Spanish science-fiction romantic comedy written and directed by Nacho Vigalondo and starring Michelle Jenner and Julián Villagrán alongside Carlos Areces and Raúl Cimas.

== Plot ==
The plot is primarily set in an apartment in Madrid. Julio wakes up one morning in an apartment, unable to remember what happened the night before. He barely has a chance to speak to the girl he spent the previous evening with, Julia, when it becomes clear there is an alien spacecraft hanging over the city.

Before long they discover that the next-door neighbor Ángel who has a crush on Julia and Julia's boyfriend Carlos are both alive.

== Cast ==
- Michelle Jenner as Julia
- Carlos Areces as Ángel
- Julián Villagrán as Julio
- Raúl Cimas as Carlos
- Miguel Noguera as tipo

== Production ==
Extraterrestrial was produced by Sayaka Producciones alongside Apaches Entertainment and Antena 3 Films, and it had the backing of Gobierno de Cantabria, Antena 3 and Canal+. Shooting locations included Lavapiés.

== Release ==
Extraterrestrial world premiered at the 2011 Toronto International Film Festival in September 2011. Its festival run also included screenings at the Fantastic Fest and the Sitges Film Festival, Distributed by Vértigo Films, the film was released theatrically in Spain on 23 March 2012.

== Reception ==
On the review aggregator website Rotten Tomatoes, 67% of 30 critics' reviews are positive, with an average rating of 6.0/10. Metacritic, which uses a weighted average, assigned the film a score of 55 out of 100, based on eight critics, indicating "mixed or average" reviews.

Marjorie Baumgarten of The Austin Chronicle rated the film 2½ out of 5 stars, declaring it as "slight, filled with lots of bark but little bite".

Jordi Costa of Fotogramas rated the film 4 out of 5 stars, highlighting the "suspense at the service of the minuscule" as the best thing about the film.

Chris Tilly of IGN rated the film 3 out of 5 stars, deeming it to be "a well-crafted romantic comedy that is chock-full of layers, managing to be both dark and light".

Eduardo Galán of Cinemanía rated the film 4 out of 5 stars, praising the impeccable approach about "how two lovers put their fiction-camouflage before the future of the human race".

Javier Ocaña of El País wrote that "although the idea, in principle, is great, the development, on the other hand, is disappointing.

Scott Wampler of Collider gave the film an 'A-' rating, billing it as a "lightweight, charming little film".

== See also ==
- List of Spanish films of 2012
