= Fina Casalderrey =

Spanish writer and educator (born 1951)

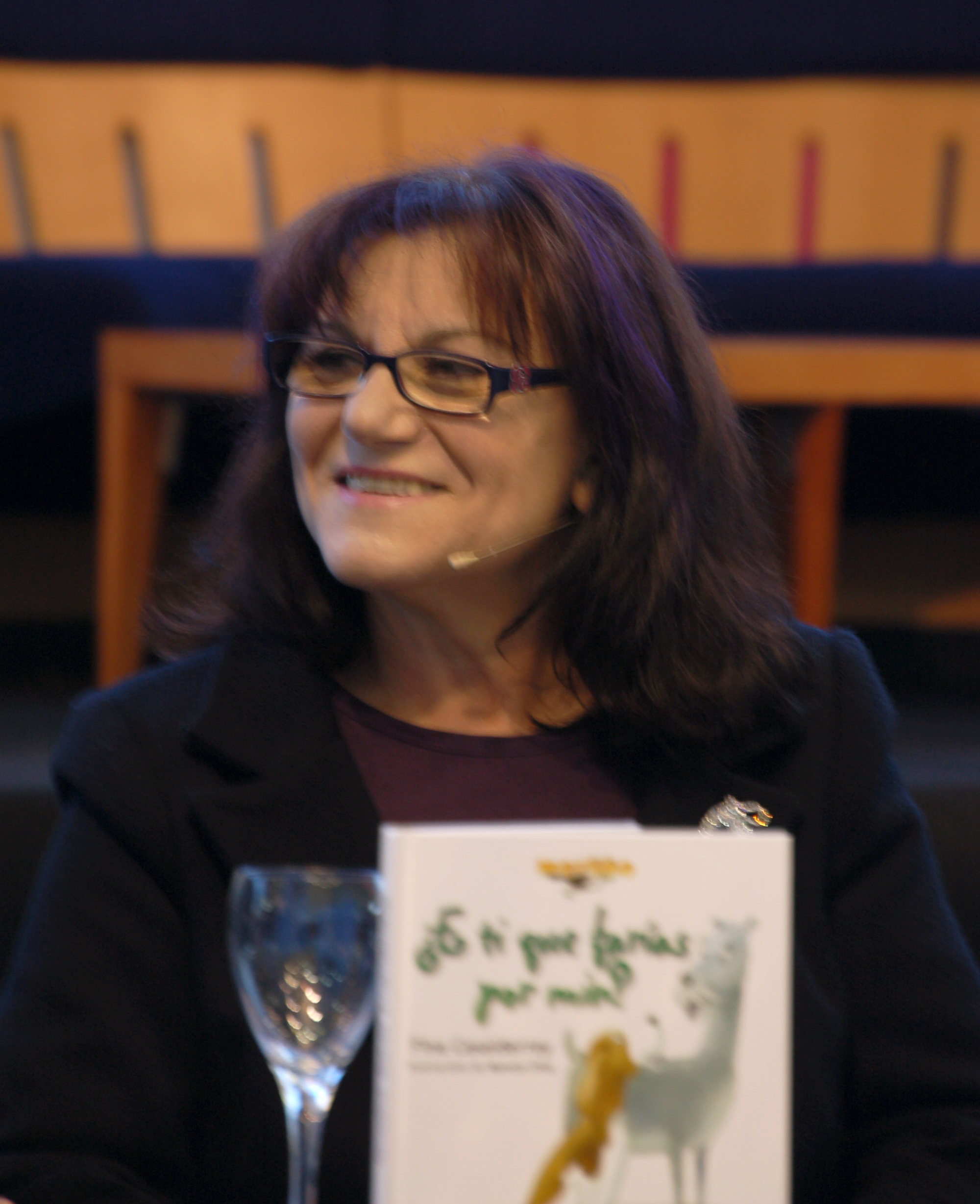
- Born: 11 August 1951 (age 75); Xeve, Pontevedra, Spain
- Writing career
- Genres: children's literature, gastronomy

Fina Casalderrey (born 11 August 1951) is a Spanish writer and educator, considered to be one of the most important writers of Galician children's literature.

== Life and career ==
She was born in Xeve in Pontevedra and began a career in teaching. She first began writing for the theatre before turning to children's books and later books on gastronomy.

She received the Castelao Medal in 2003 and the Premio da Cultura Galega in 2015. Casalderry is a member of the Royal Galician Academy. Her work has been translated into more than a dozen languages. She has also written scripts for a number of short films.

== Selected works ==
=== Children's literature ===
- Dos lágrimas por máquina (1992) received the Premio Merlín
- El misterio de los hijos de Lúa (1995) received the Premio Nacional de Literatura Infantil y Juvenil and the Premio O Barco de Vapor
- El estanque de los patos pobres (1996) received the Premio Edebé de literatura infantil y juvenil
- El lago de las niñas mudas, children's literature (2007) received the Premio Frei Martín Sarmiento

=== Gastronomy ===
- El libro de la empanada (1993)
- Fiestas gastronómicas de Galicia (1994)

=== Films ===
- Garuda (2010)
- Dos letras (2011)
- Querido Tomás (2013)
- La última moneda (2016)
