= Joaquín Reyes (comedian) =

Spanish actor

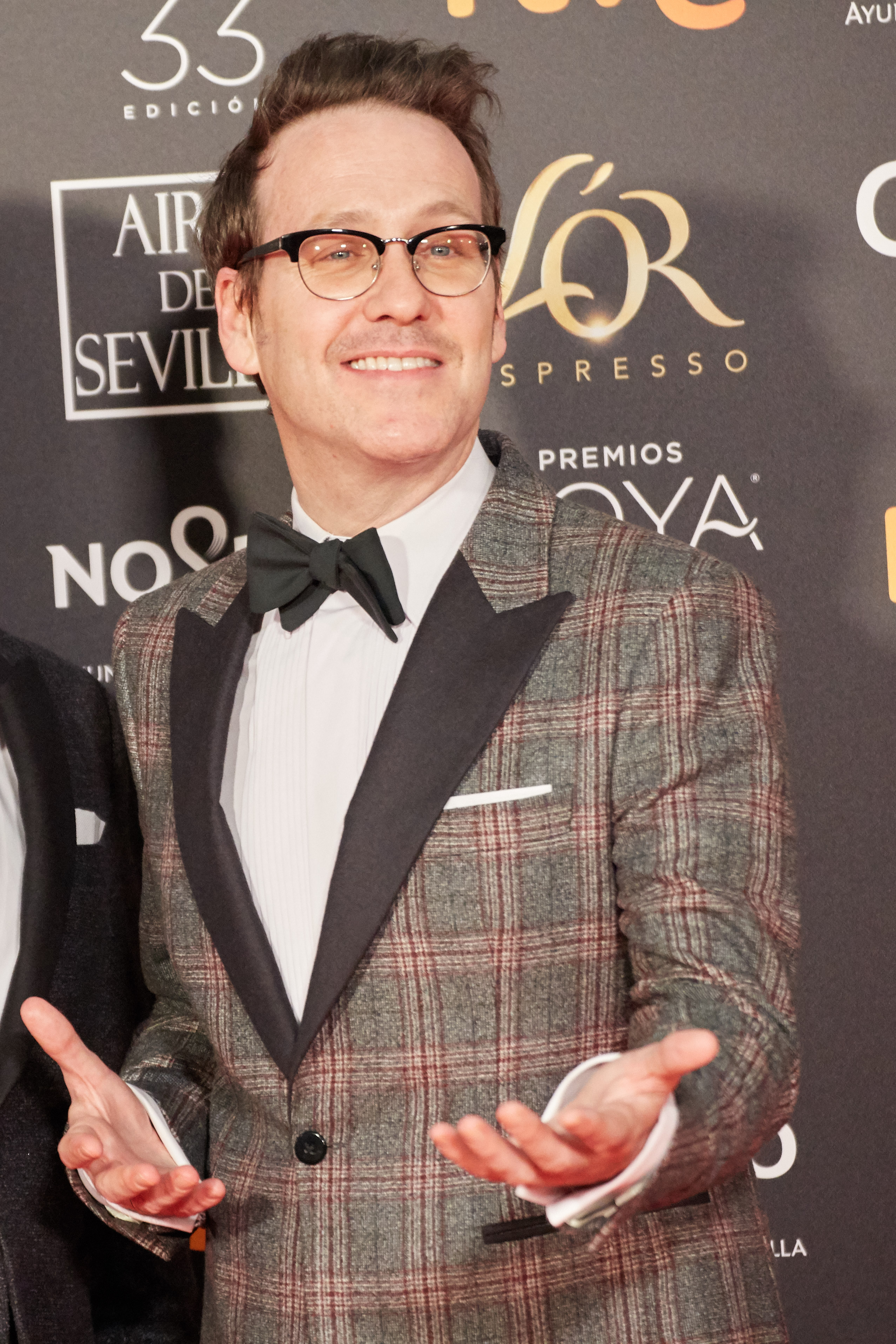
- Reyes at the 33rd Goya Awards in 2019
- Born: Joaquín Reyes Cano; 16 August 1974 (age 51); Albacete, Spain
- Occupation: Actor

Joaquín Reyes Cano (born 16 August 1974) is a Spanish actor, draftsman and comedian.

== Career ==
He managed the humorist sitcom Museo Coconut at Neox, a TDT channel of Antena 3, playing the role of Onofre. He previously worked on the Televisión Española program Muchachada Nui, La Hora Chanante in La 2, Fibrilando and Camera Café (Telecinco); and collaborates for the radio program No Somos Nadie (M80).

Reyes studied Fine Arts at the University of Castile-La Mancha and he has worked as an illustrator for publications like "El Barco de Vapor" or Zumo de lluvia, by Teresa Broseta.

In 2002, he joined Ernesto Sevilla, Pablo Chiapella and Raúl Cimas, the so-called "Trío de Albacete" ("Albacete's Trio", they were all from that province) for the Paramount Comedy program La Hora Chanante.

In 2017 Reyes enjoyed a Netflix special, Joaquín Reyes Una y No Mas, which served to introduce him to the American public. He presents the TV show Cero en Historia with Silvia Abril, Raúl Cimas, Sara Escudero and J.J. Vaquero as panelists.

He returned with Ernesto Sevilla in the TV series Capítulo 0, which was released on 11 September 2018.

== Filmography ==
- The Night My Dad Saved Christmas 2 (2025)
- Ghost Graduation (2012)
- Spanish Movie, (2009)
- Animal Crisis, (2006)
- La Gran Revelación, (2004)

=== Television ===
- Cero en Historia (2017-), #0
- Muchachada Nui (2007-), La 2
- Camera Café (2005-), Richard, Telecinco
- La Hora Chanante (2002–2006), Paramount Comedy
- A Pelo (2006–2007), La Sexta
- Nuevos Cómicos (2001), Paramount Comedy
- ¡Salvemos Eurovisión! (2008), La 1
- Planeta Finito en Escocia (2007), La Sexta
- Lo + Plus (2004–2005), Roberto Picazo, Canal+
- Smonka! (2005), Onofre, Paramount Comedy
- Noche sin tregua (2004–2006), Roberto Picazo, Paramount Comedy
- Miradas 2 (2007), TVE
- Cámara Abierta 2.0 (2007), TVE
- Informe Semanal (2007), TVE
- Silenci? (2006), TV3

== Radio ==
- No somos nadie, M80 Radio

== Drawings ==
- Colección El Barco de Vapor
  - El club de los coleccionistas de noticias
- Zumo de lluvia de Teresa Broseta
- Colección Grupo SM
  - Latín. Diccionario didáctico
  - Valencià 3º E.P. Nou Projecte Terra.
- Editorial Cruïlla
  - Ortografía castellana elemental
- El País
  - Summer supplements 2007–2008.
