= El Provencio =

El Provencio, Cuenca
- town and municipality
- Coat of arms

- Map of El Provencio.

- Location within Spain Location within Castilla-La Mancha
- Coordinates: 39°22′N 2°34′W
- Country: Spain
- Autonomous community: Castile-La Mancha
- Province: Cuenca

Area
  - Land: 101.6 km^{2} (39.2 sq mi)

Population (2025-01-01)
  - Total: 2,327
  - Density: 22.90/km^{2} (59.32/sq mi)
- Time zone: UTC+1 (UTC+1)

El Provencio is a small town and municipality in Cuenca, Spain with a population of 2,367 permanent inhabitants (2022 estimate). It has kept much of its medieval heritage and is on the newly planted trail that marks the route followed by the title character of Miguel de Cervantes's novel Don Quixote. El Provencio sits in the extreme southern area of Cuenca, bordering both Albacete and Ciudad Real. The major highway linking the town to the rest of Spain is the National 301 Madrid - Cartagena, and it is about 81 kilometers south of the city of Cuenca.

== History ==
The reason for the foundation of El Provencio, by Infante Don Juan Manuel, is attributed to the existence of the Zancara River as a source of water. El Provencio could have been founded as early as 1318, the earliest date available which refers to the foundation of the town. Don Juan Manuel was at the time Lord of Alarcón and was regent of Murcia, and was related in many ways to various kings on the Iberian Peninsula. He is considered one of the Spanish warriors of the Reconquista and is known for his campaigns of terror, and was also known for the foundation of settlements throughout the area. One of these came to be known as El Provencio, which was situated between Murcia and the regions owned by Spanish religious orders. Don Juan Manuel married the daughter of King James II of Aragon, which linked the kingdom of Aragon to El Provencio. Don Alfonso of Aragon became the first count of this Castilian area.
