= If I Were Rich (2019 film) =

- Theatrical release poster
- Spanish: Si yo fuera rico
- Directed by: Álvaro Fernández Armero
- Screenplay by: Ángela Armero; Álvaro Fernández Armero; Tom Fernández
- Based on: If I Were a Rich Man by Gérard Bitton and Michel Munz
- Produced by: Ghislain Barrois; Álvaro Augustin; Eneko Lizarraga Arratibel; Francisco Sánchez Ortiz
- Starring: Álex García; Alexandra Jiménez; Jordi Sánchez; Adrián Lastra; Diego Martín; Franky Martín; Antonio Resines; Paula Echevarría
- Production companies: Telecinco Cinema; Si yo fuera AIE; Think Studio; Ciskul
- Distributed by: Paramount Pictures
- Release date: 15 November 2019
- Country: Spain
- Language: Spanish

If I Were Rich (Spanish: Si yo fuera rico) is a 2019 Spanish comedy film directed by Álvaro Fernández Armero and consisting of a remake of the French film If I Were a Rich Man. It stars Álex García and Alexandra Jiménez alongside Jordi Sánchez, Adrián Lastra, Diego Martín, Franky Martín, Antonio Resines and Paula Echevarría.

== Plot ==
The plot follows the mishaps of Santi, who has earned a €25 million lottery prize. Since he is in the process of divorce, he tries to hide this circumstance from his wife Maite.

== Cast ==
- Álex García as Santi
- Alexandra Jiménez as Maite
- Jordi Sánchez as Damián
- Adrián Lastra as Marcos
- Franky Martín as Pedro
- Diego Martín as Mario
- Paula Echevarría Lorena
- Antonio Resines as Miguel
- Isabel Ordaz as Laura
- Bárbara Santa-Cruz as Policia Begoña
- Aritz Aranburu as himself

== Production ==
An adaptation of the 2002 French film If I Were a Rich Man (Ah! Si j'étais riche), the screenplay was penned by Álvaro Fernández Armero alongside Ángela Armero and Tom Fernández. The film was produced by Telecinco Cinema alongside Si yo fuera AIE, Think Studio and Ciskul, with the participation of Mediaset España and Movistar+. It was shot in Asturias (including Gijón, Salinas, Xagó and Verdicio) and Madrid.

== Release ==
Distributed by Paramount Pictures, the film was theatrically released in Spain on 15 November 2019. It proved to be a "surprise" success in the Spanish box office, grossing around €12 million by February 2020.

== Reception ==
Pablo Vázquez of Fotogramas rated If I Were Rich 4 out of 5 stars highlighting the "umpteenth confirmation of the talent of its leading couple and the 'scene-stealing' supporting cast" as the best thing about the film, while considering its formulaic nature and little magic as the worst thing about it.

Santiago Alverú of Cinemanía gave it 3½ out of 5 stars, considering that "in spite of falling into every imaginable commercial" tic, sublimated by a "ferocious product placement", the story still maintains its honesty.

Raquel Hernández Luján of HobbyConsolas gave the film 50 out of 100 points ("so-so"), considering that Fernández Armero throws himself into vulgarity, reproducing sketches with "body shaming, obscenities, prejudices and misunderstandings" galore in which humor "simply does not work", otherwise highlighting the performances of Alexandra Jiménez, Antonio Resines and Isabel Ordaz alongside the film's technical craft as the best things about it.

Javier Ocaña of El País highlighted the irregularity of the film, bringing together features of American screwball comedy, stale Spanish costumbrismo, French popular comedy, and even American spoof comedies while conceding that the film is still watchable because "Armero is experienced and knows how to film with taste", also pointing out that the trend of Spanish remakes to which the film belong confirms "the growing faintheartedness of part of the Spanish industry, its lack of risk-taking capacity".

== See also ==
- List of Spanish films of 2019
