= Rivals (2008 Spanish film) =

2008 film by Fernando Colomo

- Spanish: Rivales
- Directed by: Fernando Colomo
- Screenplay by: Joaquín Oristrell; Inés París
- Produced by: Luis de Val
- Starring: Rosa Maria Sardà; Ernesto Alterio; Jorge Sanz; Juanjo Puigcorbé; María Pujalte; Goya Toledo; Santi Millán; Kira Miró; Gonzalo de Castro; Javier Cifrián
- Cinematography: Antonio Lara; María Lara
- Edited by: José Luis Alcaine
- Music by: Juan Bardem
- Production company: Media Films Colomo Producciones
- Distributed by: On Pictures
- Release date: 27 June 2008 (Spain)
- Running time: 100 minutes
- Country: Spain
- Languages: Spanish; Catalan
- Budget: €50,000

Rivals (Spanish: Rivales) is a 2008 Spanish comedy-sport film directed by Fernando Colomo and written by Joaquín Oristrell and Inés París. The plot follows an Under-12 Spanish football tournament.

== Plot ==
When two youth football teams from Madrid and Barcelona with a longstanding rivalry reach the finals of the Youth Spanish Cup, the tension explodes on and off the field. The players from both teams share a bus and hotel with each other and with their coaches (who are in love but hide it), parents, a crazy grandmother, reporters and even pets. Guillermo (played by Ernesto Altiero) and his son Xavier find their relationship tested as Guillermo remembers his own failure to make the championship in his youth, while Xavier chooses his girlfriend over football. In director Fernando Colomo's own words, this is a "road trip movie about human relationships."

== Cast ==
- Rosa Maria Sardà as Rosa
- Ernesto Alterio as Guillermo
- Jorge Sanz as Jorge
- Juanjo Puigcorbé as Fernando
- María Pujalte as María
- Goya Toledo as Maribel
- Santi Millán as Xavier
- Kira Miró as Sara
- Gonzalo de Castro as Carlos
- Javier Cifrián as Pepe

== Reception ==
Jonathan Holland of Variety deemed Rivals to be a "disappointing" comedy for Colomo.

== See also ==
- List of Spanish films of 2008
