= Binibeca Vell =

Town on Menorca, Spain

Coordinates: 39.820°N 4.240°E

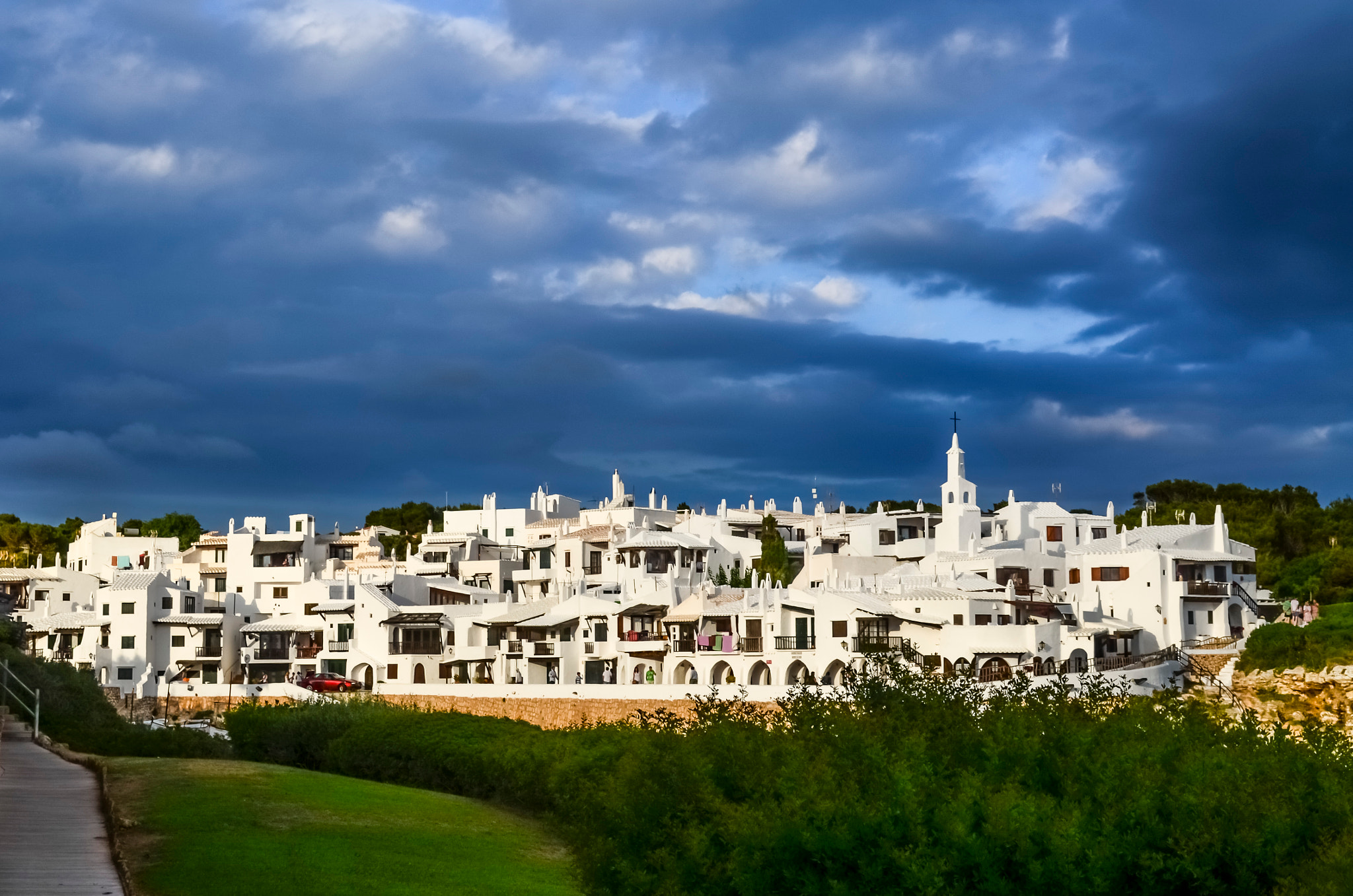
overview

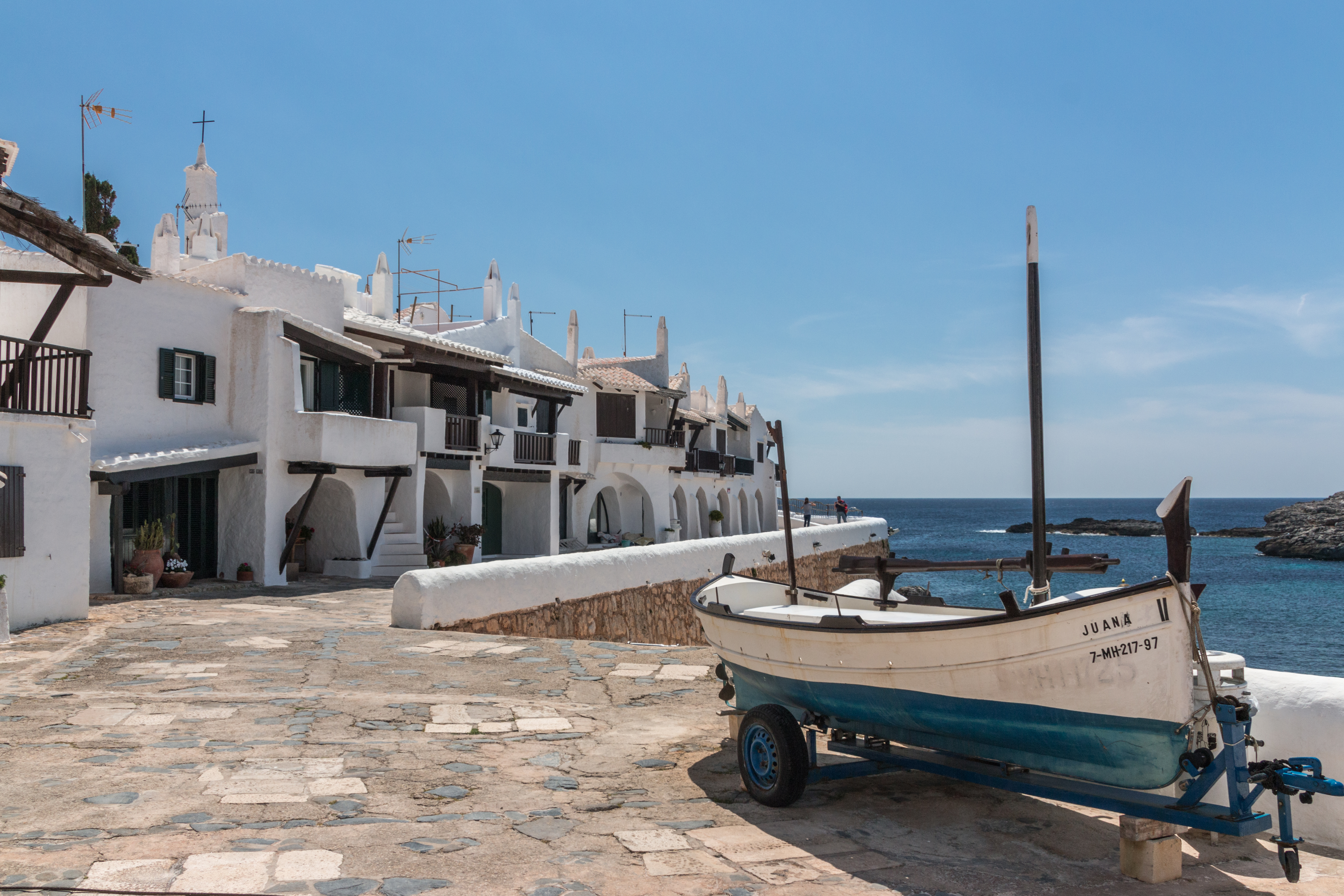
Binibeca Vell

Binibeca Vell (Catalan: Binibèquer Vell; Spanish: Binibeca Viejo) is a small town on Menorca, one of the Balearic Islands, Spain. It is located on the southern coast of the island and belongs to the municipality of Sant Lluís. It is 5 km from the capital of the municipality and 8 km from Mahón, the island's capital. It is located between Cap d'en Font to the west and Binibeca beach to the east.

== History ==
It is a town built around the 1960s, designed by the Barcelonese architect F.J. Barba Corsini, with a project emulating a prototypical style of building of coastal villages in the Mediterranean. This fact has earned it some popularity as a tourist destination, not without controversy by those who consider it an inauthentic construction, unfaithful to the style it aims to imitate.

A dispersed urbanization of single-family houses and shops has developed around the town, which has become a central destination for summer tourism. Though coastal, the place has little in the way of commercial development, but that is rapidly changing. The village of Binibeca is characterized by narrow streets and whitewashed villas and apartments. The peculiarity of staying at Binibeca is its small commercial center which offers tourists with a great selection of restaurants, bars and souvenir shops.
