= To Hell with the Ugly (film) =

- Theatrical release poster
- Spanish: Que se mueran los feos
- Directed by: Nacho G. Velilla
- Written by: Oriol Capel; David S. Olivas
- Produced by: Mercedes Gamero; Nacho G. Velilla
- Starring: Javier Cámara; Carmen Machi; Hugo Silva; Julián López; Ingrid Rubio; Lluís Villanueva; Tristán Ulloa; María Pujalte; Juan Diego
- Cinematography: David Omedes
- Edited by: Ángel Hernández Zoido
- Music by: Juanjo Javierre
- Production companies: Antena 3 Films; Producciones Aparte
- Distributed by: Warner Bros. Pictures
- Release date: 23 April 2010 (Spain)
- Country: Spain
- Language: Spanish

To Hell with the Ugly (Spanish: Que se mueran los feos) is a 2010 Spanish romantic comedy film directed by Nacho G. Velilla which stars Javier Cámara and Carmen Machi in the lead roles, also featuring Hugo Silva, Julián López, Ingrid Rubio, Lluís Villanueva, Tristán Ulloa, María Pujalte and Juan Diego.

== Plot ==
Set in the countryside, the plot concerns the love story of Eliseo, an awkward and "ugly" character, with his scorned sister-in-law, Nati.

== Cast ==
- Javier Cámara as Eliseo
- Carmen Machi as Nati
- Hugo Silva as Román
- Lluís Villanueva as Javier
- Tristán Ulloa as Abel
- Juan Diego as Auxilio
- Ingrid Rubio as Mónica
- María Pujalte as Begoña
- Julián López as Bertín, the village idiot
- Kira Miró as Paloma

== Production ==
The film was produced by Antena 3 Films and Producciones Aparte. Primarily shot in Aragon, shooting locations included Tiesas, Ansó, Hecho, Jaca, Huesca, and Zaragoza. Filming wrapped by August 2009 in Madrid. Nacho G. Velilla and Mercedes Gamero took over production duties.

== Release ==
Distributed by Warner Bros. Pictures, the film was theatrically released in Spain on 23 April 2010, and it eventually broke the 1 million viewers mark. It became the third largest grossing Spanish film in 2010 in the domestic market, after Three Steps Above Heaven and Julia's Eyes.

== See also ==
- List of Spanish films of 2010
