= La Hora Chanante =

Spanish comedy television show

- Genre: Comedy
- Presented by: Joaquín Reyes, Ernesto Sevilla, Raúl Cimas, Pablo Chiapella, Julián López, Carlos Areces, Mauro Muñiz
- Country of origin: Spain
- Original language: Spanish

Production
- Producer: Hill Valley
- Running time: 30 minutes

Original release
- Network: Paramount Comedy, Localia
- Release: May 5, 2002 – November 5, 2005

La Hora Chanante (The Whamming Hour or The Amazing Hour) is a Spanish comedy television show aired through the cable/satellite local version of the Paramount Comedy channel. Each episode is a half hour long and consists of a series of unrelated sketches (both acted out and animated) and a story featuring some celebrity which helps keep continuity throughout the program. Episodes used to be released on a monthly basis until 2006, when the show was discontinued. However, reruns are aired frequently through Paramount Comedy as well as Localia, and in December 2007, Paramount Comedy Spain and Universal Pictures launched a pack of two DVDs with the best moments of "La Hora Chanante" and some extras, an unreleased (episode 51), deleted scenes, stickers and a comic drawn by Joaquín Reyes.

It was created and directed by comedian from Albacete Joaquín Reyes, who also played the celebrities portrayed in each episode, thus serving as a show host. Many of the show's cutscenes were drawn by Lalo Kubala and Carlos Areces, both known for their work in the Spanish satire magazine El Jueves.

The staff responsible for La Hora Chanante started in September 2007 a new show with a similar format in the public channel La 2, called Muchachada Nui.

== Sections ==
Each one of the programs consists of more or less stable sections (since only the really stable ones are Testimonios, Retrospecter and Hever vs. Clever), plus some varied sketches. The main ones would be (some with the original name in Spanish and the translation next to it):

- Testimonios (Testimonies): impressions of celebrities, usually old-fashioned (1980s and early 1990s), who monologues an autobiography in a humorous tone, and tends to speak using a thick manchego accent. Also, the character whose impression is made in the Testimonials section of the program is the presenter of the program the following month.
- Retrospecter: Made out of images taken from old black and white films and TV shows without license (an example would be Mr. Wong in Chinatown with Boris Karloff), which is dubbed with commentaries in the line of the program, taking advantage of the situations for the original plot. This is a stable section in the program, and honors the habitual character of Caesar Romero.
- CÑÑ: the character Eduardo Torrijos, interpreted by Joaquín Reyes, is a parody of a special broadcaster of an informative, informing about the news (most of it being gastronomic news) for channel "CÑÑ TV" parody of CNN TV, but with the letter Ñ, mostly used in the Spanish language.
- Cuéntaselo a Asun (Tell it to Asun): Velilla Valbuena incarnates Asun, a presenter of "vespertine" magazine in which various characters go an tell about their life stories, always with a comical vision; it also has an "historical" version with popular past people like Franz Kafka, Archduke Franz Ferdinand of Austria, Karl Marx and Friedrich Engels, amongst others.
- Doctor Alce (Dr Moose): Two animation characters drawn by Joaquín Reyes (Doctor Alce/Doctor Moose) and Señor Cabeza (Mr. Head) a talking lump of jelly that lives with him) carry out conversations about TV themes, such as Batman series, starred by Adam West (in fact Doctor Alce considers himself an expert in these themes, but is not that expert at all).
- Economía Chanante y el Payaso (Chanante Economy and the Clown): In his first stage the Clown with Chanante Economy gave financial advice, and then a variety of other themes (videoclips, the creation of his videogame, etc.), always carried out by the Clown, with a tacky sense of humor that characterizes him.
- El Gañán (the most accurate translation would be Redneck): Section similar to the one of the Clown (in fact it could be considered a spin-off of it) in which "el Gañán" explains, in its unique way, some subjects like immigration, hospitality, miracles, modern art, etc., and even gives lessons like a Curso de Tollinas (Leasons of "Tollinas") in which it teaches how to slap people in the neck in the correct way or Cómo hablar en gañán (How to speak in gañán), his own way to speak Spanish.
- Superñoño: Animation series created by Joaquín Reyes in which a "superhero" who most of the time is "asobinado" (i.e. laying) in the bed explains his superpowers to us and his personal "adventures".
- Hever versus Clever: the bloopers of the program and the final section of it.
- El Rincón de Agnes (The Agnes place): Joaquín Reyes interprets Agnes, that makes commentaries about fictional books, for example "El Hombre que meó Coca-Cola" (The Man who pee Coke).
- Bizcoché y Ojos de Huever: Another animation created by Joaquín Reyes, with two kind of American rednecks that engage in an absurd conversation.
- Minutos musicales (Musical Minutes): Animation created by Carlos Areces, it's a kind of humorous and bizarre music video clip.

== List of episodes ==
- Episode 1 Starring: an old man (well, Joaquín Reyes as an old man)
- Episode 2 Starring: David Hasselhoff
- Episode 3 Starring: Nacho Duato
- Episode 4 Starring: Carl Lewis
- Episode 5 Starring: Mikhail Gorbachev
- Episode 6 Starring: Vanilla Ice
- Episode 7 Starring: Antonio Gala
- Episode 8 Starring: Michael Jackson
- Episode 9 Starring: Margareth Thatcher
- Episode 10 Starring: Francis Ford Coppola
- Episode 11 Starring: Mick Jagger
- Episode 12 Starring: Pat Morita
- Episode 13 Starring: John McEnroe
- Episode 14 Starring: Montserrat Caballé
- Episode 15 Starring: Ronald Reagan
- Episode 16 Starring: Axl Rose
- Episode 17 Starring: Anatoly Karpov
- Episode 18 Starring: Dolly Parton
- Episode 19 Starring: Salman Rushdie
- Episode 20 Starring: Liza Minnelli
- Episode 21 Starring: Mr. T
- Episode 22 Starring: Fernando Jiménez del Oso
- Episode 23 Starring: Muammar al-Gaddafi
- Episode 24 Starring: Stephen King
- Special 25 programs
- Episode 26 Starring: Nadia Comăneci
- Episode 27 Starring: Björk
- Episode 28 Starring: Karl Lagerfeld
- Episode 29 Starring: Sara Montiel
- Episode 30 Starring: Bill Cosby
- Episode 31 Starring: Richard Clayderman
- Episode 32 Starring: Nana Mouskouri
- Episode 33 Starring: Vladimir Tkachenko
- Episode 34 Starring: Barbra Streisand
- Episode 35 Starring: Mike Tyson
- Episode 36 Starring: Tim Burton
- Episode 37 Starring: Mario Alberto Kempes
- Episode 38 Starring: Hugh Hefner
- Episode 39 Starring: Ágatha Ruiz de la Prada
- Episode 40 Starring: David Copperfield
- Episode 41 Starring: Bill Gates
- Episode 42 Starring: Sarah, Duchess of York
- Episode 43 Starring: Niki Lauda
- Episode 44 Starring: José Luis Moreno
- Episode 45 Starring: Madonna
- Episode 46 Starring: Hugo Chávez
- Episode 47 Starring: María Jesús Grados
- Episode 48 Starring: Antonio López
- Episode 49 Starring: Raffaella Carrà
- Special 50 Episodes Starring: Lorenzo Lamas
- Extra DVD La Hora Chanante Episode 51 Starring: Yoko Ono
