= Kira Miró =

Spanish actress and TV presenter (born 1980)

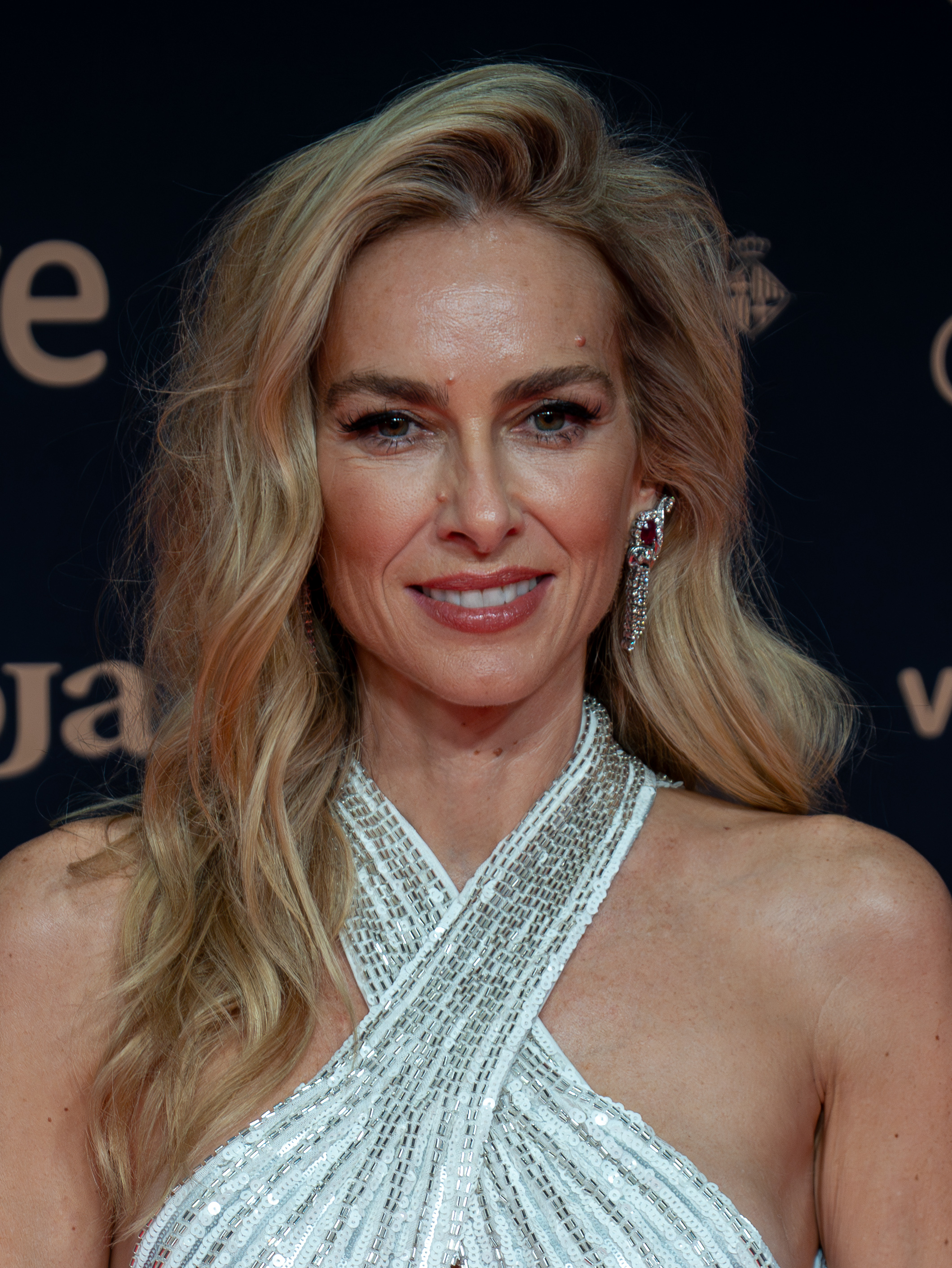
- Miró in 2025
- Born: Kira García-Beltrán Miró; 13 March 1980 (age 46); Santa Brígida, Gran Canaria, Spain
- Occupations: Actress; television presenter
- Spouse(s): Daniel Carbonell Heras (2007–2016); Salva Reina (2022–present)
- Website: www.kiramiro.com

Kira García-Beltrán Miró (born 13 March 1980) is a Spanish actress and television presenter.

== Life and career ==
Kira García-Beltrán Miró was born on 13 March 1980 in Santa Brígida, island of Gran Canaria. The second of three siblings, she is the daughter of businessman José García Beltrán aka Pepe MacDonald and producer Marta Miró. She first appeared in the small screen in teen show Desesperado Club Social. She later hosted Cuatrosfera. She made her feature film debut as an actress in Menos es más (2000). She has since featured in films such as Ferpect Crime (2004), Desde que amanece apetece (2006), El próximo Oriente (2006), Isi & Disi: alto voltaje (2006), Óscar. Una pasión surrealista (2008), Rivals (2008), Broken Embraces (2009), To Hell with the Ugly (2010), Don't Call It Love… Call It XXX (2011) and Truman (2015).

== Filmography ==
=== Film ===
Year	Title	Role	Notes	Ref.
2000	Menos es más		Feature film debut	
2002	La soledad era esto			
2003	Slam			
2004	Crimen ferpecto (Ferpect Crime)	Roxanne		
2005	Cuba libre			
2006	Isi & Disi: alto voltaje	Angie		
2006	Desde que amanece apetece	Claudia		
2006	El próximo Oriente (The Near East)	Pino		
2007	Quiéreme	Lucía		
2008	Óscar. Una pasión surrealista			
2008	Rivales (Rivals)	Sara		
2009	Los abrazos rotos (Broken Embraces)	Modelo		
2010	Que se mueran los feos (To Hell with the Ugly)	Paloma		
2011	No lo llames amor... llámalo X (''Don't Call It Love… Call It XXX)	Saray de la Isla		
2015	Truman			
2024	Odio el verano (I Hate Summer)	Vicky		
2024	¿Quién es quién?	Ana		

=== Television ===
Year	Title	Role	Notes	Ref.
2003	Los Serrano	Lola		
2007	Gominolas	Susana / Menta		
2004	Paco y Veva	Estrella		
2022–present	Machos alfa	Luz		
