= El Barco de Vapor =

Children's Spanish editorial collection

El Barco de Vapor is a children's Spanish editorial collection created in 1978 and published by Editorial SM.

In 2019, it was launched Mi Barco de Vapor, customized books to encourage the reading and teamwork on kids. There is an award named after this collection, and in 2019 it was named Premio El Barco de Vapor Caribe and is for Cuban, Dominican, and Puerto Rican writers.

== Sets ==
The titles of El Barco de Vapor are grouped by age and reading ability, in different series. So that parents, teachers, and children have a clear orientation on the most appropriate readings, the series is ordered by color.

=== White Series ===
The white series is designed for children from 4-6 years old, who are beginning to read. These books contain short lines of text, with large typography, adapted vocabulary, and a strong presence of color illustrations, which help to understand the text and favor the aesthetic education of the reader. The novels of the white series usually occupy between 32 and 70 pages.

=== Blue Series ===
The blue series is aimed at children who already know how to read (from 7 years). These books are short, have large print and color illustrations, which help to understand the text. The texts of the blue series usually occupy between 64 and 90 pages.

=== Orange Series ===
The orange series of El Barco de Vapor is designed for children from 9 years old or older who dare with longer texts. They are novels with an extension that can exceed 200 pages. The illustrations are in black and white and are staggered throughout the text.

=== Red Series ===
The red series is aimed at children from 12 years of age, expert readers who enjoy reading. In these novels, content and form are of equal importance. They can reach 256 pages.

== Authors ==
Some of the most outstanding authors of children's and youth literature have published in the El Barco de Vapor collection, such as Montserrat del Amo, Fina Casalderrey, Agustín Fernández Paz, Laura Gallego, Santiago García-Clairac, Alfredo Gómez Cerdá, Fernando Lalana, Juan Muñoz Martín, Dav Pilkey, and Jordi Sierra i Fabra.

In the more than 30 years that have passed since El Barco de Vapor was born, nearly 45 million copies of the collection have been sold. The best-selling titles are Fray Perico y su borrico, by Juan Muñoz Martín, which has sold more than a million copies and has had more than 50 editions, and El Pirata Garrapata, by the same author, which has sold more than 500,000 copies.
