= Grupo SM =

Spanish publishing group

GRUPO SM
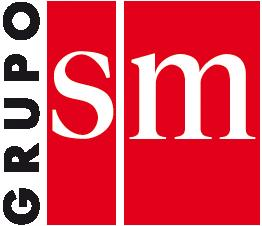
- GRUPO SM logo
- Founded: 1938
- Country of origin: Spain
- Headquarters location: Madrid, Spain
- Distribution: Argentina, Brazil, Chile, Colombia, Dominican Republic, Mexico, Peru, Puerto Rico, Spain
- Key people: Luis Fernando Crespo, Chairman
- Publication types: children's literature, educational material, English language teaching material, reference books, religious publications
- Imprints: Ediciones SM, PPC, University of Dayton Publishing, cruïlla, Ikasmina, Xerme
- No. of employees: 2000
- Official website: http://www.grupo-sm.com/

Grupo SM is a Spanish publisher with a strong presence in Latin America. It specializes in publishing educational material, fiction for children and teenagers, and religious literature (under the PPC seal). The group has a catalog of more than 9000 titles, including well-known children's literature series such as El Barco de Vapor and Gran Angular. SM operates in nine countries: Argentina, Brazil, Chile, Colombia, the Dominican Republic, Mexico, Puerto Rico, and Spain. Its books are sold in nearly 80 countries.

In 1918, The Society of Mary began publishing books, a venture which ultimately led to the creation of Grupo SM. In 1938, the Society first registered the name Ediciones SM.

In 1977, the publishing house created the Santa Maria Foundation (now the SM Foundation), with the aim of improving the quality of education in countries where SM does business. Since this time, SM has contributed corporate profits to various cultural and educational programs led by the SM Foundation.

In 1984, Grupo SM created the imprint cruïlla, which publishes educational material and literature in Catalan. Cruïlla is based in Barcelona. In 1997, the Group created two new imprints: Ikasmina and Xerme. They publish educational material and children's fiction in Basque and Galician, respectively.

In 2009, jointly with The University of Dayton, Ohio, the Group launched their ELT publishing imprint University of Dayton Publishing.

In 2011, Grupo SM recorded revenue of 266 million euros. SM has around 2000 employees. In 2013, Luis Fernando Crespo Navarro was named the organization's president.
