= Emilio Gavira =

Spanish actor (born 1964)

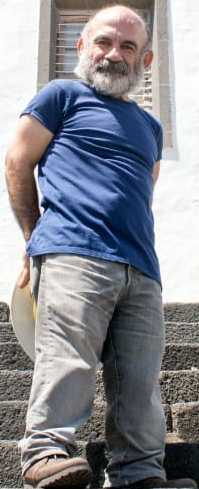
- Emilio Gavira in 2018
- Born: Emilio Gavira Tomás; 14 December 1964 (age 61); Fuengirola, Spain
- Occupations: Actor, baritone

Emilio Gavira Tomás (born 14 December 1964) is a Spanish actor.

== Early life and education ==
Emilio Gavira Tomás was born in Fuengirola on 14 December 1964, but settled in Alcázar de San Juan as a child in 1970.

He moved to Madrid in 1985 to receive a musical education.

== Career ==
He began his career as an opera singer (baritone), later also developing an acting career in film, television and theatre. He appeared in The Miracle of P. Tinto as one of the aliens. Soon after that, he featured in other films such as Mortadelo & Filemon: The Big Adventure (portraying Rompetechos) and its sequel, El Gran Zambini, El puente de San Luis Rey and Camino. His portrayal of Jesusín in Blancanieves (2012) earned him a nomination to the Goya Award for Best New Actor.

His television credits included performances in Agente 700 (Agent 700), Manos a la obra and ¡Ala... Dina! Y. He also appeared in theatricals including Carmen (1998), Los misterios de la ópera (2000), Pelo de tormenta by Francisco Nieva and recently Divinas palabras (Divine Words) with the Centro Dramático Nacional company and Henry VIII and the Schism of England with the Compañía Nacional de Teatro Clásico (National Theatrical Classic Company).

He portrayed a drifter claiming to be God in Killing God (2017), winning the Best Actor award at the 6th Gáldar International Film Festival.
