= Carlos Areces =

Spanish comics artist and actor (born 1976)

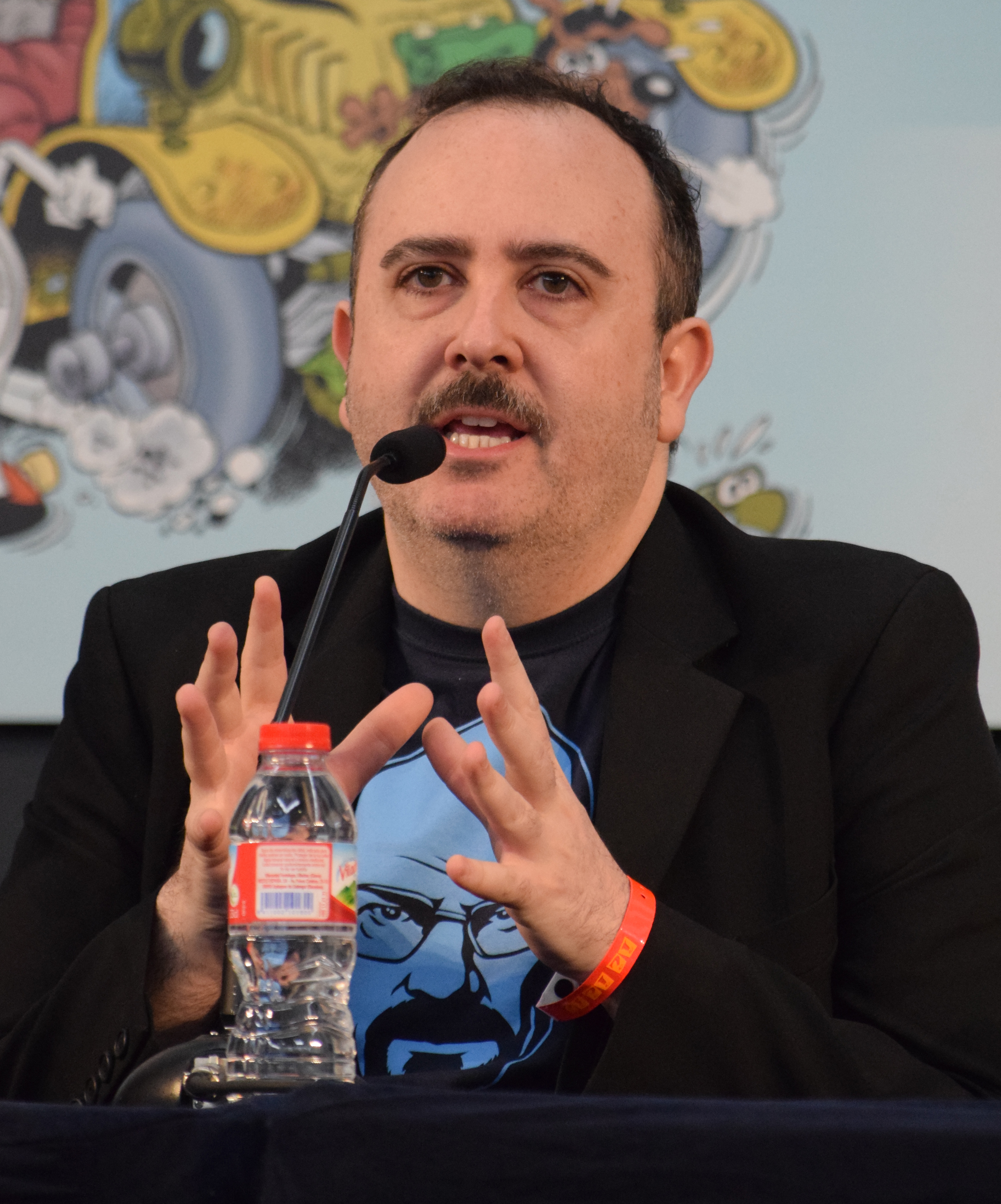
- Carlos Areces in 2016.
- Born: 27 March 1976 (age 49); Madrid, Spain
- Occupation(s): Actor, singer, comics artist
- Years active: 2002–present

Carlos Areces Maqueda (born 27 March 1976) is a Spanish actor, singer, and comics artist. He has performed in a number of television shows and in more than twenty films since 2002. He formed the musical duo Ojete Calor together with Aníbal Gómez.

== Selected filmography ==
Film
Year	Title	Role	Notes	Ref.
2009	Spanish Movie	Pedro San Antón/bar guy #5		
2010	The Last Circus	Javier		
2011	Extraterrestrial	Ángel		
2011	Torrente 4: Lethal Crisis	Bulgarian violinist		
2012	Lobos de Arga	Calixto		
2012	Ghost Graduation	Otegui		
2013	I'm So Excited	Fajas		
2013	Witching and Bitching	Conchi		
2014	Negociador (Negotiator)	Patxi		
2014	Torrente 5: Operation Eurovegas	Ricardito		
2015	My Big Night	Yuri		
2015	Spy Time	Vázquez		
2016	The Queen of Spain	Francisco Franco		
2017	You Only Live Once	Sergio González Peña		
2019	Me, Myself and My Dead Wife	Abi		
2020	Unknown Origins	Galván		
2020	One careful owner	Oscar		
2021	The Unemployment Club	Fernando		
2022	Espejo, espejo	Alberto	Oscar	
2022	La chaqueta	Special collaboration		

TV
Year	Title	Role	Notes
2002–2006	La Hora Chanante	Various roles	45 episodes
2007–2010	Muchachada Nui	Various roles	50 episodes
2008–2009	Plutón B.R.B. Nero	Teniente Querejeta	26 episodes
2010–2014	Museo Coconut	Rosario / Miss Coconut	33 episodes
2011	Cheers	Bernardo, "El Hombre Perro"	Unaired episode
2013–2014	Águila Roja	Jacobo de Castro	13 episodes
2017; 2019–present	La que se avecina	Patricio Requena / Agustín Gordillo	23 episodes
2019–present	El pueblo	Juanjo Soler	16 episodes
2021	Drag Race España	Himself / Guest judge	1 episode
