= Telecinco Cinema =

Film production division of Mediaset España

Telecinco Cinema, S.A.U.
- Formerly: Digitel 5 (1996–1999); Estudios Picasso Fábrica de Ficción (1999–2007); Producciones Cinematográficas Telecinco (2007)
- Type: Sociedad Anónima Unipersonal
- Industry: Film industry
- Founded: 23 September 1996
- Headquarters: Madrid, Spain
- Key people: Ghislain Barrois (CEO)
- Products: Motion pictures
- Parent: Mediaset España
- Website: www.telecinco.es/t5cinema

Telecinco Cinema, S.A.U. is the film production division of Mediaset España. It produces both feature films and television films.

== History ==
Telecinco Cinema is a subsidiary film company of Mediaset España. Formerly known as Estudios Picasso, the subsidiary adopted its current brand identity (Telecinco Cinema) in 2007.

While the company continued in the middle of postproduction of The Impossible, the new film by director J. A. Bayona starring Naomi Watts and Ewan McGregor; they were also working on Tadeo Jones, a 3D animation film directed by Enrique Gato.

Some other pictures produced or co-produced by Telecinco Cinema include Amigos... a comedy by Borja Manso and Marcos Cabotá, Verbo, and Dark Impulse, No Rest for the Wicked, ranked fifth among Spanish box office in 2011 and won five Goya Awards including Best Picture, Best Director and Best Original Screenplay.

Telecinco Cinema has undertaken some of Spain's biggest international hits, including Guillermo del Toro's Pan's Labyrinth (US$83 million gross at the international box office); and J. A. Bayona's The Orphanage (US$78 million) and The Impossible (US$198 million). It also produced or co-produced films such as Steven Soderbergh's Che, which won the Best Actor Award for Benicio del Toro at Cannes 2008; or the latest Agora (Alejandro Amenábar) and Cell 211 (Daniel Monzón).

Telecinco Cinema produces all genres, as shown by their filmography, with titles like Álex de la Iglesia's The Oxford Murders, Alatriste by Agustín Díaz Yanes, Brad Anderson's Transsiberian or the first Spanish spoof film Spanish Movie.

The studio has also undertaken film remakes such as Perfect Strangers (2017), I Can Quit Whenever I Want (2019), If I Were Rich (2019) and Undercover Wedding Crashers (2021).

== Films ==
2007

- Blinkers (Salir pitando)

2009

- Spanish Movie

2017

- Perfectos desconocidos (Perfect Strangers)

2018

- Superlópez
- El cuaderno de Sara (Sara's Notebook)
- Yucatán
- Ola de Crímenes (Crime Wave)

2019

- Lo dejo cuando quiera (I Can Quit Whenever I Want)
- Si yo fuera rico (If I Were Rich)

2020

- Adú
- Malnazidos

2021

- Operación Camarón (Undercover Wedding Crashers)
- Way Down (The Vault)

== Bibliography ==
- Jiménez Alcarria, Francisco (2022). "Formas de producción en el cine español. Los remakes participados por Telecinco Cinema" [Film production in Spanish Cinema. The remakes of Telecinco Cinema]. RAE-IC. Revista de la Asociación Española de Investigación de la Comunicación. 9 (17): 233–251. doi:10.24137/raeic.9.17.10. hdl:10016/37933. ISSN 2341-2690.
