= Raúl Cimas =

Spanish actor, comedian and writer

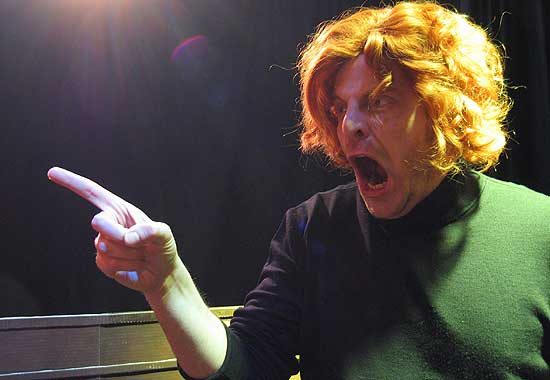
- Cimas during the filming of Muchachada Nui
- Born: Raúl Cimas Navarro; 5 November 1976 (age 48); Albacete, Spain
- Occupations: Actor; comedian; writer

Raúl Cimas Navarro (Note: Wikipedia used to add "Lequio" to his family names as a form of vandalism.) (born 5 November 1976) is a Spanish actor, comedian and writer.

== Life and career ==
Raúl Cimas Navarro was born on 5 November 1976 in Albacete.

He has appeared in television programs including Buenafuente, La Hora Chanante, and Noche Sin Tregua. In addition, he has appeared in the films Tapas, directed by José Corbacho and Juan Cruz, and Extraterrestrial, directed by Nacho Vigalondo.

In 2014 he wrote a comic titled Demasiada pasión por lo suyo and it was published by Blackie Books.

From 2017 Raúl Cimas is the panelist with Silvia Abril, Sara Escudero and J.J. Vaquero in the TV program Cero en Historia, which is presented by Joaquín Reyes.

From 2012 to 2019 he appears in the play Ilustres ignorantes along Javier Coronas, Javier Cansado and Pepe Colubi. He also appears in Late Motiv.
