= Ernesto Sevilla =

Spanish screenwriter, actor, director, comedian and TV presenter

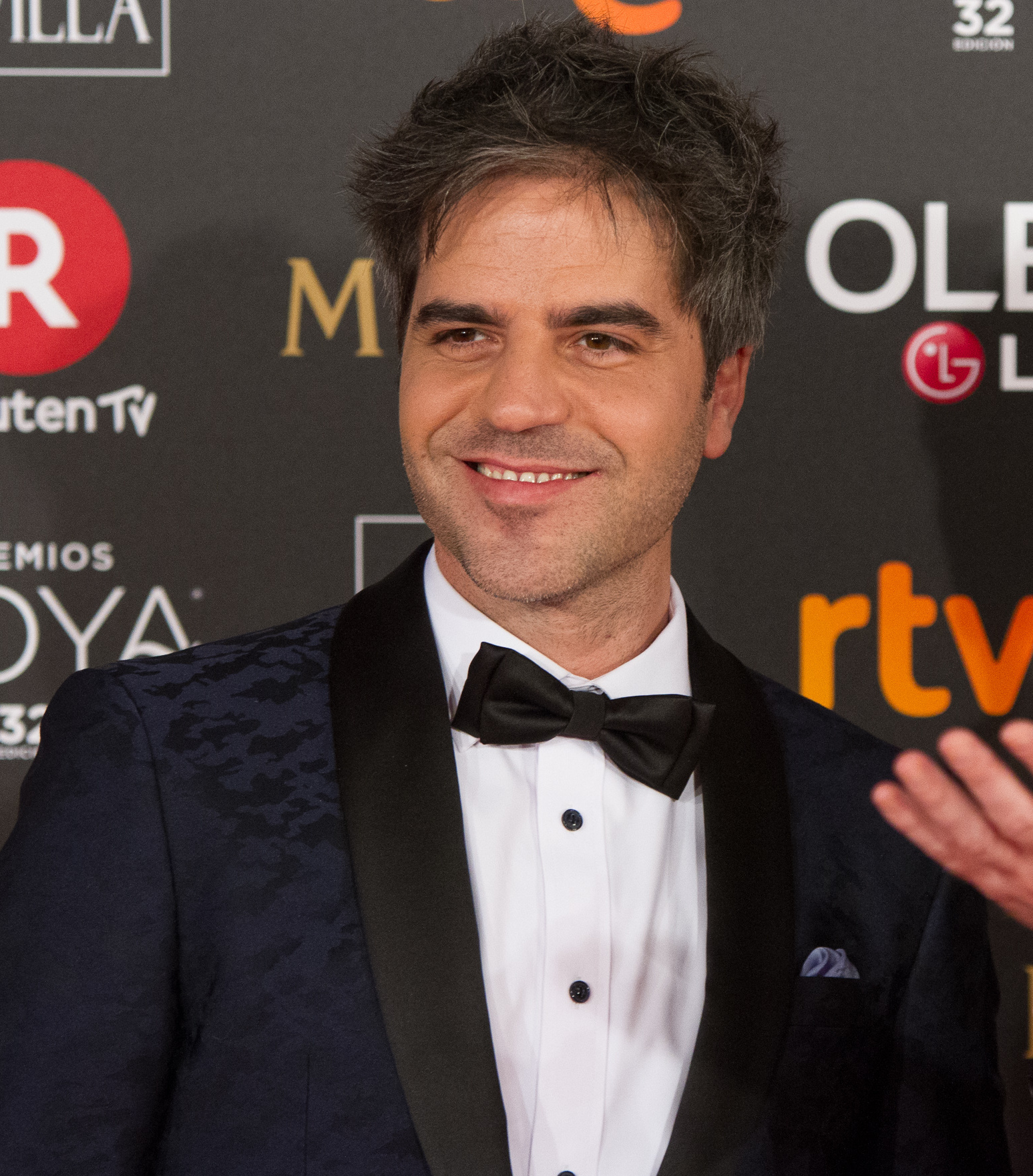
- Ernesto Sevilla at 32nd Goya Awards
- Born: Ernesto Sevilla López; 16 May 1978 (age 48); Albacete, Spain
- Education: Universidad de Castilla-La Mancha
- Occupations: TV director; actor; comedian; screenwriter; television presenter
- Height: 1.77 m (5 ft 10 in)
- Partners: Berta Collado (2010); Patricia Conde (2015–2016)
- Parents: Gabriel Sevilla (father); Josefina López (mother)

Ernesto Sevilla López (born 16 May 1978) is a Spanish TV director, actor, comedian, screenwriter and TV presenter.

== Career ==
He began as a screenwriter for Paramount Comedy. In July 2015 he became a main character in La que se avecina with Jordi Sánchez and Nathalie Seseña. He appeared in an advertising campaign for Amena. In February 2018 he presented with Joaquín Reyes the 32nd Goya Awards. He portrayed the TV series Capítulo 0 with Joaquín Reyes, which was released on 11 September 2018. In April 2019 he appeared in the film I Can Quit Whenever I Want, directed by Carlos Therón and starring Amaia Salamanca, Cristina Castaño and Miren Ibarguren.

== Personal life ==
From 2015 to 2016 he was in a relationship with the TV presenter Patricia Conde.
