= Father There Is Only One =

2019 Spanish comedy film

- Spanish: Padre no hay más que uno
- Directed by: Santiago Segura
- Screenplay by: Marta González de Vega; Santiago Segura
- Based on: Ten Days Without Mom by Juan Vera
- Produced by: Ricardo Marco Budé; María Luisa Gutiérrez; Axier Pérez; Guido Rud; Ignacio Salazar-Simpson; Santiago Segura; Cindy Teperman
- Starring: Santiago Segura; Toni Acosta; Leo Harlem; Sílvia Abril
- Cinematography: Ángel Iguácel
- Edited by: Fran Amaro
- Music by: Roque Baños
- Production companies: Bowfinger International Pictures; Sony Pictures International Productions; Mamá se fue de viaje la película A.I.E.; Cindy Teperman; Mogambo; Atresmedia Cine
- Distributed by: Sony Pictures Releasing de España
- Release date: 1 August 2019
- Running time: 98 minutes
- Country: Spain
- Language: Spanish

Father There Is Only One (Spanish: Padre no hay más que uno) is a 2019 Spanish comedy film directed and starring Santiago Segura, and scored by Roque Baños. It is a remake of the 2017 Argentine film Ten Days Without Mom. It sparked a film series of four sequels: Father There Is Only One 2 (2020), Father There Is Only One 3 (2022), Father There Is Only One 4 (2024), and Father There Is Only One 5 (2025).

== Plot ==
Javier García is a man who thinks he knows everything, but he doesn't help with the housework or his five children. However, he has to face reality when his wife decides to go on a trip and leaves him alone with the kids.

== Cast ==
- Santiago Segura as Javier
- Toni Acosta as Marisa
- Sílvia Abril as Carmen
- Leo Harlem as Tío Paco
- Wendy Ramos as Rosaura
- Martina D'Antiochia as Sara
- Calma Segura as Carlota
- Luna Fulgencio as Rocío
- Carlos González Morollón as Dani
- Sirena Segura as Paula
- Anabel Alonso as Directora
- Marta González de Vega as Madre del Chat 1
- Mónica Pérez as Madre del chat 2
- Diana Navarro as Madre del chat 3
- Miguel Lago as Jefe de Javier
- Daniela Blume as Cliente 1
- Fernando Gil as Cliente 2
- Goizalde Núñez as Azafata nerviosa
- Alberto Casado as Psicólogo infantil
- Pepa Charro as Profesora preescolar
- Inés de León as Sandra
- Boris Izaguirre as himself
- Carlos Baute as himself
- Rosa López as herself
- Ona Carbonell as Profesora de natación
- El Rubius as himself
- Iván Armesto as Taxista
- Carlo D'Ursi as Consultor funcional
- Pilar Calvo as Programadora
- Paco Collado as Pajares
- Richy Castellanos as Esteso
- Marco Ezcurdia as Niño okupa
- Jason Tigreros as Camarero
- Ethan Pan Wang as Carlitos
- Cloe Ruiz as Hermana de Carlitos
- Úrsula Murayama as Azafata de facturación
- Javier Enrique Mendoza as Mariachi 1
- Cesar Augusto Hernandez as Mariachi 2
- Andrés Ignacio Vásquez as Mariachi 3
- Arancha Martí as Madre 'Conchi'
- Fernando Sáez as Padre 'Conchi'

== Production ==
The film was produced by Bowfinger International Pictures, Sony Pictures International Productions and Mamá se fue de viaje la película A.I.E., alongside Cindy Teperman and Mogambo, with the collaboration of Atresmedia Cine, and the participation of Amazon Prime Video and Atresmedia.

== Release ==
It was the second best premiere at the Spanish box office in 2019. It raised more than 3 millions of euros and 600.000 spectators in its first week. It became the highest-grossing Spanish film of the year in Spain.

== See also ==
- List of Spanish films of 2019
