= Father There Is Only One (franchise) =

Spanish family comedy film series

- Created by: Santiago Segura
- Years: 2019–present
- Based on: Ten Days Without Mom

Films and television
- Films: Father There Is Only One; Father There Is Only One 2; Father There Is Only One 3; Father There Is Only One 4; Father There Is Only One 5
- Television series: Father There Is Only One, The Series

Father There Is Only One (Spanish: Padre no hay más que uno) is a Spanish family comedy film series directed by Santiago Segura. It follows the life and misadventures of an upper-middle-class Spanish family of a married couple with five children, headed by Segura himself.

The first film in the film series, which was released in 2019, is a remake of the 2017 Argentine film Ten Days Without Mom. Due to the box office success in Spain of the remake, it was followed by a second (2020), third (2022), fourth (2024), and fifth (2025) film, which were originally written by Segura and Marta González de Vega, and also box office hits. A television series, based on the films but with different cast and characters, premiered in 2026 on Atresplayer.

The original Argentine film was also remade in Italy as When Mom Is Away (2019), which has yielded a first and second sequel; and in France as 10 jours sans maman (2020), which has yielded a sequel. The Italian and French sequels are unrelated and independent of the Spanish franchise.

== Films ==
=== Father There Is Only One (2019) ===
Javier García is a man who thinks he knows everything, but he doesn't help with the housework or his five children. However, he has to face reality when his wife decides to go on a trip and leave him alone with the kids.

The film is a remake of the 2017 Argentine film Ten Days Without Mom, adapted by Santiago Segura and Marta González de Vega, and directed by and starring Segura himself. It was released on 1 August 2019 becoming the highest-grossing Spanish film of the year in Spain.

=== Father There Is Only One 2 (2020) ===
Javier seems to have now everything under control, but a new baby and the arrival of the mother-in-law turn the family upside down.

Due to the box office success in Spain of the first film, it was followed by a sequel, originally written by Segura and González de Vega, directed again by Segura himself, and with all the main cast reprising their roles; something that has also happened in the rest of the sequels. It was released on 19 July 2020 becoming the highest-grossing film of the year in Spain.

=== Father There Is Only One 3 (2022) ===
The family's life gets more complicated as Christmas approaches.

The film was released on 14 July 2022 becoming the highest-grossing Spanish film of the year in Spain.

=== Father There Is Only One 4 (2024) ===
Everything gets more complicated upon the announcement of the engagement of the eldest daughter Sara with Ocho in her 18th birthday.

The film was released on 17 July 2024 becoming the highest-grossing Spanish film of the year in Spain.

=== Father There Is Only One 5 (2025) ===
Javier is having a crisis because none of his children want to become independent and leave the house.

The film was released on 26 June 2025 becoming the highest-grossing Spanish film of the year in Spain.

=== Cast and characters ===
Characters	Films				
Characters	Father There Is Only One	Father There Is Only One 2	Father There Is Only One 3	Father There Is Only One 4	Father There Is Only One 5
Characters	2019	2020	2022	2024	2025
Javier García	Santiago Segura	Santiago Segura	Santiago Segura	Santiago Segura	Santiago Segura
Marisa Loyola	Toni Acosta	Toni Acosta	Toni Acosta	Toni Acosta	Toni Acosta
Sara García Loyola	Martina D'Antiochia	Martina D'Antiochia	Martina D'Antiochia	Martina D'Antiochia	Martina D'Antiochia
Carlota García Loyola	Calma Segura	Calma Segura	Calma Segura	Calma Segura	Calma Segura
Rocío García Loyola	Luna Fulgencio	Luna Fulgencio	Luna Fulgencio	Luna Fulgencio	Luna Fulgencio
Daniel "Dani" García Loyola	Carlos González Morollón	Carlos González Morollón	Carlos González Morollón	Carlos González Morollón	Carlos González Morollón
Paula "Paulita" García Loyola	Sirena Segura	Sirena Segura	Sirena Segura	Sirena Segura	Sirena Segura
Paco García	Leo Harlem	Leo Harlem	Leo Harlem	Leo Harlem	Leo Harlem
Carmen	Silvia Abril	Silvia Abril	Silvia Abril	Silvia Abril	Silvia Abril
Rosaura	Wendy Ramos	Wendy Ramos	Wendy Ramos	Wendy Ramos	Wendy Ramos
Leticia	Marta González de Vega	Marta González de Vega	Marta González de Vega	Marta González de Vega	Marta González de Vega
Mother at school	Diana Navarro	Diana Navarro	Diana Navarro		
Mother at school	Mónica Pérez	Mónica Pérez	Mónica Pérez		
Milagros García		Loles León	Loles León	Loles León	Loles León
Ocho		Diego Arroba	Diego Arroba	Diego Arroba	Diego Arroba
Priest		Florentino Fernández		Florentino Fernández	Florentino Fernández
Annoying neighbor			Florentino Fernández		
Sandra's mother		Carmen Alcayde	Carmen Alcayde		
Agustín Loyola			Carlos Iglesias	Carlos Iglesias	Carlos Iglesias
Cristina García Loyola			Luna López	Blanca Ramírez	Blanca Ramírez
Nora				Neus Asensi	Neus Asensi

== Television ==
A television series produced by Atresmedia, based on the films but with different cast and characters, premiered on 25 January 2026 on Atresplayer. It stars Daniel Pérez Prada as Mateo Vicho and Mariam Hernández as Helena Vaello.

Inés de León co-wrote the series with Raúl Navarro and Juan Manuel de Vega, and co-directed it with Navarro.
