= List of Spanish films of 2021 =

A list of Spanish-produced and co-produced feature films released in Spain in 2021. When applicable, the domestic theatrical release date is favoured.

== Films ==
Release		Title (Domestic title)	Cast & Crew	Distribution label	Ref.
J A N U A R Y	29	Below Zero (Bajocero)	Director: Lluís Quílez Cast: Javier Gutiérrez, Karra Elejalde, Luis Callejo, Patrick Criado	Netflix	
J A N U A R Y	29	A Perfect Enemy (La cosmética del enemigo)	Director: Kike Maíllo Cast: Tomasz Kot, Athena Strates, Marta Nieto	Filmin	
F E B R U A R Y	26	Crazy About Her (Loco por ella)	Director: Dani de la Orden Cast: Álvaro Cervantes, Susana Abaitua, Luis Zahera, Aixa Villagrán, Clara Segura, Alberto San Juan	Netflix	
M A R C H	26	Libertad	Director: Enrique Urbizu Cast: Bebe, Isak Férriz, Xabier Deive, Jorge Suquet, Sofía Oria, Jason Fernández	A Contracorriente Films	(Note: Theatrical cut simultaneously released as television miniseries on Movistar+.)
A P R I L	30	Game of Power (Crónica de una tormenta)	Director: Mariana Barassi Cast: Ernesto Alterio, Clara Lago, Quique Fernández	Syldavia Cinema	(Note: Co-production Spain–Argentina (78%–22%))
M A Y	21	Polyamory for Dummies (Poliamor para principiantes)	Director: Fernando Colomo Cast: Karra Elejalde, María Pedraza, Quim Ávila, Toni Acosta, Lola Rodríguez, Eduardo Rosa, Cristina Gallego, Luis Bermejo, Inma Cuevas	Vértice 360	
M A Y	21	Mia y Moi	Director: Borja de la Vega Cast: Bruna Cusí, Ricardo Gómez, Eneko Sagardoy, Joe Manjón	—N/a	
M A Y	28	The Year of Fury (El año de la furia)	Director: Rafa Russo Cast: Alberto Ammann, Joaquín Furriel, Daniel Grao, Martina Gusman, Sara Sálamo, Maribel Verdú	Filmax	(Note: Co-production Spain–Argentina (80%–20%))
J U N E	4	Xtreme (Xtremo)	Director: Daniel Benmayor Cast: Teo García, Óscar Jaenada, Óscar Casas, Andrea Duro, Sergio Peris-Mencheta	Netflix	
J U N E	11	Just One Time (Solo una vez)	Director: Guillermo Ríos Cast: Ariadna Gil, Álex García, Silvia Alonso	A Contracorriente Films	
J U N E	11	The House of Snails (La casa del caracol)	Director: Macarena Astorga Cast: Javier Rey, Paz Vega, Carlos Alcántara	Filmax	(Note: Co-production Spain–Peru (79.89%–20.11%).)
J U N E	18	Mighty Flash (Destello bravío)	Director: Ainhoa Rodríguez Cast: Guadalupe Gutiérrez, Carmen Valverde, Isabel María Mendoza	Filmin	
J U N E	24	Undercover Wedding Crashers (Operación Camarón)	Director: Carlos Therón Cast: Julián López, Natalia de Molina, Carlos Librado ‘Nene’, Miren Ibarguren	Buena Vista International	
J U N E	25	Lucas	Director: Álex Montoya Cast: Jorge Motos, Jorge Cabrera, Jordi Aguilar	Begin Again Films	
J U L Y	2	A Dead Man Cannot Live (Hombre muerto no sabe vivir)	Director: Ezekiel Montes Cast: Antonio Dechent, Rubén Ochandiano, Elena Martínez, Jesús Castro, Paco Tous, Nancho Novo, Manuel de Blas	Filmax	
J U L Y	2	The Wanderer (La viajante)	Director: Miguel Mejías Cast: Ángela Boix, Miquel Insua	Begin Again Films	
J U L Y	9	The Kids Are Alright (A todo tren. Destino Asturias)	Director: Santiago Segura Cast: Santiago Segura, Leo Harlem, Florentino Fernández, Joaquín Reyes	Warner Bros. Pictures	
J U L Y	16	Ama	Director: Júlia de Paz Solvas Cast: Tamara Casellas, Leire Marín, Estefanía de los Santos, Ana Turpin	Filmax	
J U L Y	23	The Cover (El Cover)	Director: Secun de la Rosa Cast: Àlex Monner, Marina Salas, Carolina Yuste, Lander Otaola, María Hervás, Susi Sánchez	eOne Spain	
J U L Y	23	Two (Dos)	Director: Mar Targarona Cast: Marina Gatell, Pablo Derqui	Filmax	
J U L Y	27	Garcia & Garcia (García y García)	Director: Ana Murugarren Cast: José Mota, Pepe Viyuela, Eva Ugarte, Carlos Areces, Martita de Graná, Jordi Sánchez, Mikel Losada, Ricardo Castella, Jesús Vidal, Ainara Arnero, Antonio Resines	A Contracorriente Films	
J U L Y	30	More the Merrier (Donde caben dos)	Director: Paco Caballero Cast: Ernesto Alterio, Raúl Arévalo, Luis Callejo, Anna Castillo, Pilar Castro, Álvaro Cervantes	Filmax	
A U G U S T	18	Dogtanian and the Three Muskehounds (D'Artacán y los Tres Mosqueperros)	Director: Toni García	A Contracorriente Films	
A U G U S T	20	Descarrilados	Director: Fernando García-Ruiz Cast: Julián López, Arturo Valls, Ernesto Sevilla, Dafne Fernández	Sony Pictures	
S E P T E M B E R	3	Girlfriends (Chavalas)	Director: Carol Rodríguez Colás Cast: Vicky Luengo, Elisabet Casanovas, Carolina Yuste, Ángela Cervantes	Filmax	
S E P T E M B E R	10	Carpoolers (Con quién viajas)	Director: Martín Cuervo Cast: Salva Reina, Ana Polvorosa, Andrea Duro, Pol Monen	A Contracorriente Films	
S E P T E M B E R	17	When Brooklyn Met Seville (Sevillanas de Brooklyn)	Director: Vicente Villanueva Cast: Carolina Yuste, Sergio Momo, Estefanía de los Santos, Manolo Solo, Canco Rodríguez	Filmax	
S E P T E M B E R	17	The Consequences (Las consecuencias)	Director: Claudia Pinto Emperador Cast: Juana Acosta, Alfredo Castro, María Romanillos, Carme Elías	Syldavia Cinema	(Note: Co-production Spain–Belgium–Netherlands (70%–15%–15%).)
S E P T E M B E R	17	The Unemployment Club (El club del paro)	Director: David Marqués Cast: Carlos Areces, Eric Francés, Adrià Collado, Fernando Tejero	Vértice 360	
S E P T E M B E R	24	Maixabel	Director: Icíar Bollaín Cast: Luis Tosar, Blanca Portillo, Urko Olazabal	Buena Vista International	
S E P T E M B E R	29	Sounds Like Love (Fuimos canciones)	Director: Juana Macías Cast: María Valverde, Álex González, Susana Abaitua, Elisabet Casanovas, Eva Ugarte	Netflix	
O C T O B E R	1	Mediterraneo: The Law of the Sea (Mediterráneo)	Director: Marcel Barrena Cast: Eduard Fernández, Dani Rovira, Anna Castillo	DeAPlaneta	
O C T O B E R	8	Outlaws (Las leyes de la frontera)	Director: Daniel Monzón Cast: Marcos Ruiz, Begoña Vargas, Chechu Salgado	Warner Bros. Pictures	
O C T O B E R	8	Parallel Mothers (Madres paralelas)	Director: Pedro Almodóvar Cast: Penélope Cruz, Milena Smit, Israel Elejalde, Aitana Sánchez-Gijón	Sony Pictures	
O C T O B E R	15	The Good Boss (El buen patrón)	Director: Fernando León de Aranoa Cast: Javier Bardem, Manolo Solo, Almudena Amor, Óscar de la Fuente, Sonia Almarcha, Fernando Albizu, Tarik Rmili, Rafa Castejón, Celso Bugallo	Tripictures	
O C T O B E R	22	Who's Stopping Us (Quién lo impide)	Director: Jonás Trueba Cast: Candela Recio, Pablo Hoyos, Silvio Aguilar, Rony-Michelle Pinzaru, Pablo Gavira, Claudia Navarro, Marta Casado, Sancho Javiérez	Atalante	
O C T O B E R	29	The Replacement (El sustituto)	Director: Óscar Aibar Cast: Ricardo Gómez, Vicky Luengo, Pere Ponce, Pol López, Joaquín Climent, Nuria Herrero, Frank Feys, Susi Sánchez, Bruna Cusí, Guillermo Montesinos	Karma Films	(Note: Co-production Spain–Belgium (80%–20%).)
O C T O B E R	29	Once Upon a Time in Euskadi (Érase una vez en Euskadi)	Director: Manu Gómez Cast: Asier Flores, Aitor Calderón, Miguel Rivera, Hugo García	eOne Films Spain	
N O V E M B E R	5	Out of Sync (Tres)	Director: Juanjo Giménez Cast: Marta Nieto, Miki Esparbé	Filmax	(Note: Co-production Spain–France–Lithuania (70%–10%–20%).)
N O V E M B E R	5	Josephine (Josefina)	Director: Javier Marco Rico Cast: Emma Suárez, Roberto Álamo, Miguel Bernardeau, Olivia Delcán, Manolo Solo, Simón Andreu, Pedro Casablanc	Super 8 Distribución	(Note: Co-production Spain–Germany (80%–20%).)
N O V E M B E R	12	The King of All the World (El rey de todo el mundo)	Director: Carlos Saura Cast: Greta Elizondo, Isaac Hernández, Ana de la Reguera, Manuel García Rulfo, Damián Alcázar, Enrique Arce, Manolo Cardona	Syldavia Cinema	(Note: Co-production Spain–Mexico (30%–70%).)
N O V E M B E R	12	Lemon and Poppy Seed Cake (Pan de limón con semillas de amapola)	Director: Benito Zambrano Cast: Elia Galera, Eva Martín, Claudia Faci, Marilú Marini, Tommy Schlesser, Mariona Pagès	Filmax	(Note: Co-production Spain–Luxembourg (77%–23%).)
N O V E M B E R	12	The Vault (Way Down)	Director: Jaume Balagueró Cast: Freddie Highmore, Astrid Berges-Frisbey, Liam Cunningham, Sam Riley, Luis Tosar, José Coronado	Sony Pictures	(Note: Theatrically released in Brazil and Taiwan in January 2021.)
N O V E M B E R	12	The Belly of the Sea (El ventre del mar)	Director: Agustí Villaronga Cast: Roger Casamajor, Oscar Kapoya	Elastica	
N O V E M B E R	12	Magical Christmas (Cuidado con lo que deseas)	Director: Fernando Colomo Cast: Dani Rovira, Cecilia Suárez, José Sacristán	A Contracorriente Films	
N O V E M B E R	19	Libertad	Director: Clara Roquet Cast: Maria Morera, Nicolle García, Nora Navas, Carol Hurtado, Vicky Peña	Avalon	
N O V E M B E R	19	Portrait of White Woman with Grey Hair and Wrinkles (Retrato de mujer blanca con pelo cano y arrugas)	Director: Iván Ruiz Flores Cast: Blanca Portillo, Ana Wagener, Carmen Esteban, Carlo D'Ursi, Manuel Morón, Imanol Arias	—N/a	
N O V E M B E R	26	The Sacred Spirit (Espíritu sagrado)	Director: Chema García Ibarra Cast: Nacho Fernández, Llum Arques, Joanna Valverde, Rocío Ibáñez	La Aventura	
N O V E M B E R	26	Our (Perfect) Xmas Retreat (El refugio)	Director: Macarena Astorga Cast: Loles León, Leo Harlem, María Barranco, David Guapo, Sara Sálamo, Carlos Alcántara, Mariam Hernández, Antonio Dechent, Luna Fulgencio, Rubén Fulgencio, Marco Ezcurdia	Filmax	
N O V E M B E R	26	The Daughter (La hija)	Director: Manuel Martín Cuenca Cast: Javier Gutiérrez, Irene Virgüez Filippidis, Patricia López Arnaiz	Caramel Films	
D E C E M B E R	1	Ego	Director: Alfonso Cortés-Cavanillas Cast: María Pedraza, Pol Monen, Marian Álvarez, Alicia Borrachero	Begin Again Films	
D E C E M B E R	3	The Perfect Family (La familia perfecta)	Director: Arantxa Echevarría Cast: Belén Rueda, José Coronado, Gonzalo de Castro, Carolina Yuste, Gonzalo Ramos, Pepa Aniorte, Jesús Vidal	Universal Pictures International	
D E C E M B E R	3	Love Gets a Room (El amor en su lugar)	Director: Rodrigo Cortés Cast: Clara Rugaard, Ferdia Walsh-Peelo, Magnus Krepper, Freya Parks, Jack Roth, Henry Goodman	A Contracorriente Films	(Note: Co-production Spain–United Kingdom (80%–20%).)
D E C E M B E R	3	Tengamos la fiesta en paz	Director: Juan Manuel Cotelo Cast: Teresa Ferrer, Carlos Aguillo, Mamen García, Eva Bravo, Ana Bravo, Juan Sánchez, Miguel Alejandro Serrano, Santi Rodríguez, Juan Manuel Cotelo	—N/a	
D E C E M B E R	3	The Odd-Job Men (Sis dies corrents)	Director: Neus Ballús Cast: Mohamed Mellali, Valero Escolar, Pep Sarrà	Filmax	
D E C E M B E R	10	Alegría	Director: Violeta Salama Cast: Cecilia Suárez, Laia Manzanares, Sarah Perles, Mara Guil, Leonardo Sbaraglia	Caramel Films	
D E C E M B E R	10	That Was Life (La vida era eso)	Director: David Martín de los Santos Cast: Petra Martínez, Anna Castillo	Elamedia	
D E C E M B E R	10	Valentina	Director: Chelo Loureiro	Super 8 Distribución	
D E C E M B E R	10	Wetland (El lodo)	Director: Iñaki Sánchez Arrieta Cast: Raúl Arévalo, Paz Vega, Joaquín Climent, Roberto Álamo, Susi Sánchez	Vértice 360	
D E C E M B E R	17	You Keep the Kids! (Mamá o papá)	Director: Dani de la Orden Cast: Miren Ibarguren, Paco León	Warner Bros. Pictures	
D E C E M B E R	24	1000 Miles from Christmas (A 1000 kilómetros de la Navidad)	Director: Álvaro Fernández Armero Cast: Tamar Novas, Andrea Ros	Netflix	

== Box office ==
The ten highest-grossing Spanish films in 2021, by domestic box office gross revenue, are as follows:

Highest-grossing films of 2021
Rank	Title	Distributor	Admissions	Domestic gross (€)
1	The Kids Are Alright (¡A todo tren! Destino Asturias)	Warner Bros. Pictures	1,500,811	8,493,358
2	The Vault (Way Down)	Sony Pictures	887,897	5,628,247
3	Undercover Wedding Crashers (Operacion Camarón)	Buena Vista International	597,700	3,522,415
4	The Good Boss (El buen patrón)	Tripictures	528,523	3,336,892
5	Maixabel	Buena Vista International	515,293	2,828,416
6	Parallel Mothers (Madres paralelas)	Sony Pictures	426,582	2,627,717
7	You Keep the Kids! (Mamá o papá)	Warner Bros. Pictures	295,223	1,814,261
8	The Perfect Family (La familia perfecta)	Universal Pictures	202,597	1,309,944
9	Dogtanian and the Three Muskehounds (D'Artacan y los tres mosqueperros)	A Contracorriente Films	216,848	1,181,161
10	García y García	A Contracorriente Films	176,181	1,025,363

== See also ==
- 36th Goya Awards
- List of 2021 box office number-one films in Spain
