= The Kids Are Alright 2 =

- Theatrical release poster
- Spanish: A todo tren 2
- Directed by: Inés de León
- Written by: Marta González de Vega; Santiago Segura
- Produced by: María Luisa Gutiérrez; Mercedes Gamero; Santiago Segura
- Starring: Paz Vega; Paz Padilla; Hugo Simón; Alan Miranda; Eneko Otero; Luna Fulgencio; Javier García; Sirena Segura; Verónica López; Santiago Segura; Leo Harlem; Florentino Fernández; Diego Arroba "El Cejas"; Chani Martín; Carlos Iglesias; Ramón Langa
- Cinematography: Javier Salmones
- Edited by: Fran Amaro; Desirée Duro
- Music by: Roque Baños; Ben Cherney
- Production companies: Bowfinger International Pictures; Atresmedia Cine; A todo tren 2 LP AIE
- Distributed by: Warner Bros. Pictures
- Release date: 2 December 2022
- Country: Spain
- Language: Spanish

The Kids Are Alright 2 (Spanish: A todo tren 2: Sí, les ha pasado otra vez; or simply A todo tren 2) is a 2022 Spanish comedy film directed by Inés de León and written by Marta González de Vega and Santiago Segura. It is a sequel to The Kids Are Alright. It features Paz Vega, Paz Padilla, Santiago Segura, and Leo Harlem alongside a children cast.

== Plot ==
Upon Ricardo and Felipe's sloppy children oversight in the events of The Kids Are Alright, Clara does not trust them this time, so she takes the kids by herself (together with friend Susana) to the summer camp.

== Cast ==
- Paz Vega as Clara
- Paz Padilla as Susana
- Santiago Segura as Ricardo
- Leo Harlem as Felipe
- Hugo Simón
- El Cejas as Unai
- Alan Miranda as Marcos
- Eneko Otero as Nacho
- Luna Fulgencio as Lara
- Javier García as Fernandito
- Sirena Segura as Diana
- Verónica López as Cristinita
- Chani Martín
- Ramón Langa
- Carlos Iglesias
- Kerem Bürsin
- Inés de León

== Production ==
The film is a sequel to Santiago Segura's box office hit The Kids Are Alright (2021), with Inés de León taking over direction duties in her sophomore feature after Get Her... If You Can. It was written by Santiago Segura and Marta González de Vega. It is a Bowfinger International Pictures, Atresmedia Cine and A todo tren 2 LP AIE production, with the participation of Atresmedia, and Movistar Plus+, and in association with Mogambo and Latido Films. Shooting locations included Madrid, the Region of Murcia (including Águilas), and the provinces of Segovia and Toledo.

== Release ==
The film was theatrically released in Spain on 2 December 2022.

== See also ==
- List of Spanish films of 2022
