= Father There Is Only One 4 =

- Theatrical release poster
- Original title: Padre no hay más que uno 4: Campanas de boda
- Directed by: Santiago Segura
- Written by: Marta González de Vega; Santiago Segura
- Produced by: Santiago Segura; María Luisa Gutiérrez
- Starring: Santiago Segura; Toni Acosta; Martina D'Antiochia; Calma Segura; Luna Fulgencio; Carlos González Morollón; Sirena Segura; Blanca Ramírez
- Production companies: Bowfinger International Pictures; Padre Cuatro AIE
- Distributed by: Sony Pictures Entertainment Iberia
- Release date: 17 July 2024
- Country: Spain
- Language: Spanish

Father There Is Only One 4 (Spanish: Padre no hay más que uno 4: Campanas de boda) is a 2024 Spanish comedy film directed, co-written and produced by Santiago Segura, who also co-stars. It is the fourth installment of the Father There Is Only One film series.

== Plot ==
The plot follows the events unravelling in the García family upon the announcement of the engagement of the eldest daughter Sara with Ocho in her 18th birthday, with the parents (Javier and Marisa) hellbent on averting the marriage while simultaneously dealing with Carlota's new boyfriend.

== Cast ==
- Santiago Segura as Javier
- Toni Acosta as Marisa
- Calma Segura as Carlota
- Sirena Segura as Paula
- Luna Fulgencio as Rocío
- Martina D'Antiochia as Sara
- Blanca Ramírez
- Carlos G. Morollón as Dani
- Leo Harlem as Paco
- Silvia Abril as Carmen
- Loles León as Milagros
- Carmen Conesa
- Carlos Iglesias as Agustín
- Antonio Resines
- Antonio de la Torre
- Florentino Fernández
- Vanesa Romero
- Mar Saura
- El Cejas as Ocho
- Marta González de Vega as Leticia
- Anabel Alonso

== Production ==
The film was produced by Bowfinger International Pictures alongside Padre Cuatro AIE, with the association of Sony Pictures Entertainment Iberia and the participation of Netflix, Atresmedia and Crea SGR. It was shot in between Madrid and Gran Canaria.

== Release ==
The film was released theatrically in Spain on 17 July 2024 by Sony Pictures Entertainment Iberia. As it grossed over €860,000 (with 160,000 admissions) on Wednesday 17, it had the best opening day for a Spanish film in 9 years at the domestic box office, and the best opening Wednesday ever for a Spanish film.

== Reception ==
Raquel Hernández Luján of HobbyConsolas gave the film 40 points ('bad'), citing the "lack of wit, poor performances, dysfunctional humor and shameless product placement" as the film's worst.

Pablo Vázquez of Fotogramas rated the film 3 out of 5 stars, declaring it "a sparkling vaudeville" that ultimately offers "a consequent reflection on time and its tolls".

Rubén Romero Santos of Cinemanía rated the film 1 out of 5 stars, writing that "one can only think that this franchise and its recalcitrant defense of an obnoxious family responds to a conspiracy to reduce the Spanish population and increase the demographic winter".

== See also ==
- List of Spanish films of 2024
