= Father There Is Only One 5 =

- Theatrical release poster
- Spanish: Padre no hay más que uno 5: Nido repleto
- Directed by: Santiago Segura
- Written by: Marta González de Vega; Santiago Segura
- Produced by: Santiago Segura; María Luisa Gutiérrez
- Cinematography: Javier Salmones
- Edited by: Fran Amaro
- Music by: Roque Baños
- Production companies: Bowfinger International Pictures; Padre 5 nido repleto AIE; Irusoin; Esto también pasará
- Distributed by: Sony Pictures Releasing International
- Release date: 26 June 2025
- Running time: 100 minutes
- Country: Spain
- Language: Spanish

Father There Is Only One 5 (Spanish: Padre no hay más que uno 5: Nido repleto) is a 2025 Spanish family comedy film directed by Santiago Segura and co-written by Marta González de Vega. It is the fifth installment of the Father There Is Only One film series.

== Plot ==
Unlike other parents who suffer the empty nest syndrome, Javier García experiences a 'full nest' situation, as nobody wants to leave home.

== Cast ==
- Santiago Segura as Javier García
- Toni Acosta as Marisa Loyola
- Martina D'Antiochia as Sara García Loyola
- Calma Segura as Carlota García Loyola
- Luna Fulgencio as Rocío García Loyola
- Carlos González Morollón as Daniel 'Dani' García Loyola
- Sirena Segura as Paula 'Paulita' García Loyola
- Blanca Ramírez as Cristina 'Cris' García Loyola
- Leo Harlem as Paco García
- Silvia Abril as Carmen
- Loles León as Milagros
- Diego Arroba 'El Cejas' as Carlos Ocho
- Carlos Iglesias as Agustín Loyola
- Neus Asensi
- Antonio Resines
- Xavier Deltell
- David Fernández Ortiz as Rodolfo Chikilicuatre
- Florentino Fernández
- Omar Montes
- Marta González de Vega as Leticia
- Wendy Ramos as Rosaura

== Production ==
The film was produced by Bowfinger International Pictures, Padre 5 nido repleto AIE, Esto También Pasará, and Irusoin, with the association of Sony Pictures Entertainment Iberia and Mogambo and the participation of Netflix, Atresmedia, and CreaSGR. Shooting locations included Gran Canaria.

== Release ==
Distributed by Sony Pictures, the film was released theatrically in Spain on 26 June 2025. It opened in 408 screens, grossing around €2.4 million (350,000 admissions) in its four-day debut weekend, thereby becoming the highest-grossing debut for a Spanish film in 2025 up to that date and the highest grossing film of the weekend.

== Reception ==
Gregorio Belinchón of El País assessed that the first 60 minutes are the best in the series, but as soon as Segura "opens his hand, multiplying cameo appearances and launching physical jokes, the gear assembly explodes".

Alberto Corona of eldiario.es assessed that in all the film's "laziness and automatism", it can be assumed that even Santiago Segura is already quite tired of the formula, "tedious to the point of delirium".

== See also ==
- List of Spanish films of 2025
