= Just One Small Favor =

- Theatrical release poster
- Spanish: El favor
- Directed by: Juana Macías
- Screenplay by: Cristóbal Garrido; Adolfo Valor
- Produced by: Antonio Asensio; Paloma Molina; Mercedes Gamero
- Starring: Inma Cuesta; Diego Martín; Sara Sálamo; Alfonso Bassave; Pere Ponce; Betsy Túrnez; Iván Renedo; Gonzalo de Castro; Isabel Ordaz; Luisa Gavasa
- Cinematography: Andreu Rebés
- Edited by: Victoria Lammers
- Music by: Vanessa Garde
- Production companies: Zeta Cinema; Pumuky Films; Atresmedia Cine
- Distributed by: Universal Pictures International Spain
- Release date: 10 November 2023
- Country: Spain
- Language: Spanish

Just One Small Favor (Spanish: El favor, lit. 'The Favour') is a 2023 Spanish screwball comedy film directed by Juana Macías from a screenplay by Cristóbal Garrido and Adolfo Valor. It stars Inma Cuesta, Diego Martín, Sara Sálamo, and Alfonso Bassave, among others.

== Plot ==
Upon the death of their nanny Amparito, well-off Gallardo siblings refuse to bury her in the family vault, going against Amparito's dying wish. They start receiving letters from Amparito, revealing uncomfortable truths about them.

== Cast ==
- Inma Cuesta as Teresa
- Diego Martín as Benja
- Sara Sálamo as Aura
- Alfonso Bassave as Tomás
- Pere Ponce as Fermín
- Gonzalo de Castro as Carlos
- Isabel Ordaz as Mariola
- Luisa Gavasa as Amparito
- Betsy Túrnez as Carmen
- Iván Renedo as Nico

== Production ==
The screenplay was penned by Cristóbal Garrido and Adolfo Valor. Director Juana Macías billed the comedy as "classist" and, after a search for extreme and authentic real-life inspirations, she acknowledged Tamara Falcó as a benchmark for one of the characters. The film is a Zeta Cinema, Atresmedia Cine and Pumuky Films AIE production. It had the participation of Atresmedia, Movistar Plus+, Televisió de Catalunya, funding from ICAA and backing from ICEC. It was shot in Barcelona in 2022.

== Release ==
Distributed by Universal Pictures International Spain, the film was released theatrically in Spain on 10 November 2023. Filmax acquired international rights to the film.

== Accolades ==
| Year | Award | Category | Nominee(s) | Result | Ref. |
|---|---|---|---|---|---|
| 2024 | 3rd Carmen Awards | Best Actress | Inma Cuesta | Nominated | |

== See also ==
- List of Spanish films of 2023
