= Three-60 =

- Theatrical release poster
- Spanish: Tres 60
- Directed by: Alejandro Ezcurdia
- Screenplay by: Luiso Berdejo
- Produced by: Luiso Berdejo; Ritxi Lizartza; Mikel Lejarza; Mercedes Gamero; Santiago Segura; Mª Luisa Gutiérrez
- Starring: Raúl Mérida; Guillermo Estrella; Sara Sálamo; Joaquim de Almeida; Adam Jeziersky; Geraldine Chaplin
- Cinematography: Johnny Yebra
- Edited by: Fran Amaro
- Music by: Roque Baños
- Production companies: Bowfinger International Pictures; Atresmedia Cine; Zinea Sortzen
- Distributed by: Warner Bros. Pictures
- Release date: 27 July 2013
- Country: Spain
- Language: Spanish

Three-60 (Spanish: Tres 60) is a 2013 Spanish mystery thriller film directed by Alejandro Ezcurdia (in his directorial debut feature) from a screenplay by Luiso Berdejo, who is also the co-producer. The film stars Raúl Mérida alongside Guillermo Estrella, Sara Sálamo, and Joaquim de Almeida.

== Plot ==
The plot is set against the backdrop of surf culture. Upon finding a set of photographs featuring long-missing friend Iván, young surfer Guillermo teams up with younger brother Mario, Fine Arts student Daniela and pal "El Ruso" to crack the mystery, involving a sinister commercial cartel.

== Cast ==
- Raúl Mérida as Guillermo
- Guillermo Estrella as Mario
- Sara Sálamo as Daniela
- Joaquim de Almeida as Alberto Ibarguren
- Adam Jezierski as Ruso
- Geraldine Chaplin as Jean Christophe
- Carolina Ferre as madre
- Marta Martín as Maria Victoria

== Production ==
The screenplay was penned by Luiso Berdejo. The film is a Bowfinger International Pictures, Atresmedia Cine, and Zinea Sortzen production with the participation of Antena 3 TV, ETB, ONO, Canal+ and La Sexta and backing from the Basque Government and Ayuntamiento de Donostia. Shooting locations included the Aiete Palace and Zurriola Beach in San Sebastián.

The sex scene between Raúl Mérida and Sara Sálamo was shot three months after the main filming had finished, because the production company wanted a different ending. The actress accepted without problems but later revealed that the experience was very unpleasant.

== Release ==
Distributed by Warner Bros., the film was released theatrically in Spain on 26 July 2013.

== Reception ==
Fausto Fernández of Fotogramas rated the film 3 out of 5 stars, deeming it to be a "a summer adventure of mystery, suspense and tension", "that puts all the infallible Hitchcockian arsenal at the service of a teen movie with a child sidekick".

Andrea G. Bermejo of Cinemanía rated the film 3 out of 5 stars, writing that although a thriller connoisseur "might dismiss [the film] as flat, we should not forget the [young] audience it appeals to", and, seeing it this way, "it is even formative".

== See also ==
- List of Spanish films of 2013
