= Sirena Segura =

Spanish child actress (born 2013)

- Born: Sirena Segura Amaro; 26 December 2013 (age 12); Madrid, Spain
- Occupation: Actress
- Years active: 2019–present
- Parent: Santiago Segura

Sirena Segura Amaro (born 26 December 2013) is a Spanish child actress, daughter of Spanish actor and filmmaker Santiago Segura. She is best known for her role in the films series Father There Is Only One (2019-2025) as Paula.

== Early life ==
Sirena Segura Amaro was born on 26 December 2013 in Madrid, Spain, to Santiago Segura and María Amaro. She has an older sister named Calma, who is also an actress.

== Career ==
Segura started acting at a young age in films directed by her father. At the age of five, she made her first onscreen role in Father There Is Only One (2019) as Paula. She reprised the role in the sequel, Father There Is Only One 2 (2020). In 2021, she starred in The Kids Are Alright as Diana. In 2022, Segura reprised the role of Paula in the third part, Father There Is Only One 3 and she returned as Diana in the sequel, The Kids Are Alright 2. In 2023, she appeared in Summer Vacation as Carmen. She returned as Paula in the fourth part, Father There Is Only One 4 (2024). In 2025, she reprised the role for last time on the last and fifth part, Father There Is Only One 5.

== Filmography ==
Year	Title	Role	Notes
2019	Father There Is Only One	Paula	
2020	Father There Is Only One 2	Paula	
2021	The Kids Are Alright	Diana	
2022	Father There Is Only One 3	Paula	
2022	The Kids Are Alright 2	Diana	
2023	Summer Vacation	Carmen	
2024	Father There Is Only One 4	Paula	
2025	Father There Is Only One 5	Paula	
2026	Torrente for President	TikTok Girl #1	
