= The Kids Are Alright (2021 film) =

- Theatrical release poster
- Spanish: ¡A todo tren! Destino Asturias
- Directed by: Santiago Segura
- Written by: Santiago Segura; Marta González de Vega
- Based on: Attention au départ!
- Produced by: Ricardo Marco Budé; María Luisa Gutiérrez; Ignacio Salazar-Simpson; Santiago Segura
- Starring: Santiago Segura; Leo Harlem; Diego Arroba "El Cejas"; David Guapo; Alan Miranda; Eneko Oller; Luna Fulgencio; Javier García; Sirena Segura; Verónica López; Joaquín Reyes; Florentino Fernández
- Cinematography: Ángel Iguácel
- Edited by: Fran Amaro
- Music by: Roque Baños
- Production companies: Bowfinger International Pictures; Atresmedia Cine; Buendía Estudios; Todos Al Tren La Película A.I.E.; Glow
- Distributed by: Warner Bros. Pictures España
- Release date: 8 July 2021
- Country: Spain
- Language: Spanish

The Kids Are Alright (Spanish: ¡A todo tren! Destino Asturias) is a 2021 Spanish comedy film directed by Santiago Segura which stars Segura himself and Leo Harlem. It is a remake of the French film Attention au départ!.

== Plot ==
Ricardo is charged with accompanying his son, along with a group of kids, to a camp in Asturias. Felipe, the grandfather of one of the kids, also goes alongside him. However, both end up missing the train, leaving the kids on their own.

== Cast ==
- Santiago Segura as Ricardo.
- Leo Harlem as Felipe.
- Diego Arroba "El Cejas" as Unai.
- David Guapo.
- Alan Miranda.
- Eneko Oller.
- Luna Fulgencio.
- Javier García.
- Sirena Segura.
- Verónica López.
- Joaquín Reyes as Ramón Rosado.
- Florentino Fernández as Lucas Ferrero.
- Paz Vega
- Cristina Pedroche
- Eva Isanta
- Sara Sálamo
- Wilbur
- Itziar Castro
- Eduardo Antuña
- Marta González de Vega

== Production ==
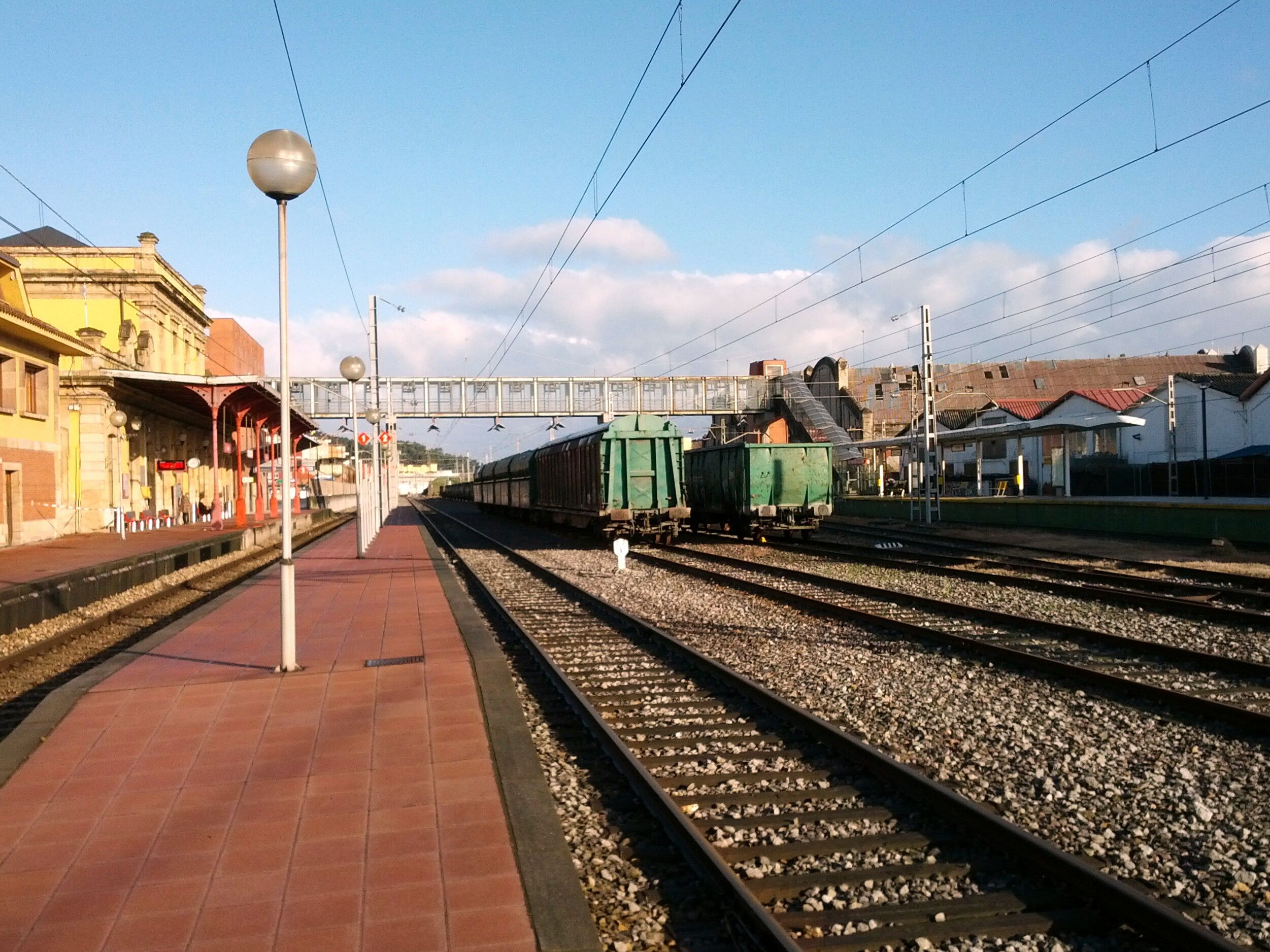
The Avilés railway station was one of the shooting locations.

Written by the director Santiago Segura alongside Marta González de Vega, the film is a remake of the 2021 French film Attention au départ!, which actually hit the French theatres later than the Spanish release. The Kids are Alright was produced by Bowfinger International Pictures and Atresmedia Cine in collaboration with Buendía Estudios, Todos Al Tren La Película A.I.E. and Glow, with participation of Atresmedia and Movistar+.

Shooting took place in Asturias (including Illas, Avilés and Puente de los Fierros), but footage was also shot in locations of the province of Toledo (Illescas) and the Madrid region.

The film's original song, Tu tren, was performed by Carlos Jean and Bebe.

== Release ==
Distributed by Warner Bros. Pictures España, the film was theatrically released in Spain on 8 July 2021. It became the highest-grossing Spanish film of 2021.

== Reception ==
Rubén Romero Santos of Cinemanía gave the film 2 out of 5 stars. Lacking in creativity and displaying characters' indefinition, he found the kids' subplot to be a drag, to the point of "turning the viewer into a little Herod". He also found worrying the turn of the filmmaking career of Santiago Segura, having become an adaptator of inane family comedy films.

Fausto Fernández of Fotogramas gave it 4 out of 5 stars, praising the situations which the Leo Harlem's character set the rest of characters in. He considered both of the two film subplots to work fine: that of the kids in the train, and particularly the complementary one (a sort of road movie).

Raquel Hernández Luján of HobbyConsolas gave the film 45 out of 100 points, considering it to be a clone of previous Segura's proposals, praising the character performed by David Guapo, while decrying the cringeful jokes related to inclusive language and machismo, and overall the stale tone of the film.

Josu Eguren of El Correo gave the film 1 out of 3 stars, considering it fell short in terms of comedy. He pointed out at the film separating the gags dedicated to a child audience and those dedicated to an adult audience, with the "weak group of brats" on one side and the part led by Segura, Harlem and Guapo on the other side.

== See also ==
- List of Spanish films of 2021
