= Our (Perfect) Xmas Retreat =

- Theatrical release poster
- Spanish: El refugio
- Directed by: Macarena Astorga
- Written by: Alicia Luna; Beatriz Iznaola; Inés Silva
- Produced by: Alvaro Ariza Tirado; Xosé Zapata
- Starring: Loles León; Leo Harlem; María Barranco; David Guapo; Sara Sálamo; Carlos Alcántara; Mariam Hernández; Antonio Dechent; Luna Fulgencio; Rubén Fulgencio; Marco Ezcurdia
- Cinematography: Fran Fernández Pardo
- Edited by: Fran Amaro
- Music by: Karin Zielinski
- Production companies: Esto también pasará Bowfinger International; Tondero Producciones; Hippo Entertainment Group; Sygnatia; Cindy Teperman
- Release dates: November 26, 2021 (Spain); December 8, 2021 (Peru)
- Running time: 91 minutes
- Countries: Spain; Peru; Mexico; Argentina
- Language: Spanish

Our (Perfect) Xmas Retreat (Spanish: El refugio; lit. 'The shelter') is a 2021 Christmas comedy film directed by Macarena Astorga. It stars a choral cast made up of Loles León, Leo Harlem, María Barranco, David Guapo, Sara Sálamo, Carlos Alcántara, Mariam Hernández, Antonio Dechent, Luna Fulgencio, Rubén Fulgencio and Marco Ezcurdia. It was released on November 26, 2021 in Spain and in Peru on December 8.

== Synopsis ==
As if it were a Christmas story, two little brothers listen attentively by the fireplace to a new story from their grandfather, which may not be entirely a fantasy. In it, the story of a movie star in low hours and an emerging heartthrob who threatens to displace the previous one is told thanks to the tricks of their agent, the owner of the high mountain hotel and her crazy sister, promoter of a new and peculiar discipline that mixes yoga and fengshui, a group of children wanting to have fun, but also to discover hidden secrets, a taciturn bellboy who sees everything and a tremendous storm that will leave them isolated days before Christmas.

== Cast ==
- Loles León as Star
- Leo Harlem as Luismi
- Maria Barranco as Lola
- David Guapo as Fede Guerra
- Sara Sálamo as Alex
- Carlos Alcántara as Antonio Rojas
- Mariam Hernández as Trini
- Antonio Dechent as Hilario
- Luna Fulgencio as Martina
- Rubén Fulgencio as Hugo
- Marco Ezcurdia as Lucas
- Juan Manuel Lara as Yeti

== See also ==
- List of Spanish films of 2021
