= Father There Is Only One 3 =

- Theatrical release poster
- Spanish: Padre no hay más que uno 3
- Directed by: Santiago Segura
- Written by: Marta González de Vega; Santiago Segura
- Produced by: Santiago Segura; Mercedes Gamero; María Luisa Gutiérrez
- Starring: Santiago Segura; Toni Acosta; Carlos Iglesias; Loles León
- Production companies: Bowfinger International Pictures; Atresmedia Cine; Padre no hay más que uno 3 AIE
- Distributed by: Sony Pictures Entertainment Iberia
- Release date: 14 July 2022
- Country: Spain
- Language: Spanish

Father There Is Only One 3 (Spanish: Padre no hay más que uno 3) is a 2022 Spanish Christmas comedy film directed and starred by Santiago Segura. It is the third installment of the Father There Is Only One film series. The cast is completed by the likes of Toni Acosta, Carlos Iglesias, and Loles León.

== Plot ==
The plot tracks the developments in the García Loyola family as Christmas looms in, including the kids breaking a Nativity scene figurine and the eldest sibling breaking up with her boyfriend.

== Cast ==
- Santiago Segura as Javier García
- Toni Acosta as Marisa Loyola
- Carlos Iglesias as Abuelo Agustín
- Loles León as Milagros
- Leo Harlem as Tío Paco
- Silvia Abril as Carmen
- Martina D'Antiochia as Sara
- Calma Segura as Carlota
- Luna Fulgencio as Rocío
- Carlos González as Dani
- Sirena Segura as Paula
- Luna López
- El Cejas as Ocho
- Marta González de Vega as Leticia
- Diana Navarro
- Mónica Pérez
- Carmen Alcayde
- Omar Montes
- Florentino Fernández
- Carmen Conesa
- Goizalde Núñez

== Production ==
The film is a Bowfinger International Pictures, Atresmedia Cine and Padre no hay más que uno 3 AIE production, with the association of Sony Pictures International Productions and the participation of Atresmedia and Prime Video. Filming began in the Madrid's Plaza Mayor in December 2021. Carlos Iglesias replaced Antonio Resines (originally cast as the family's grandfather) owing to the latter's December 2021 hospitalization from COVID-19.

== Release ==
Distributed by Sony Pictures Entertainment Iberia, the film was theatrically released in Spain on 14 July 2022. It grossed €745,000 (over 108,000 admissions) in its opening day, making the best debut for a Spanish film in the domestic market since 2015, and becoming the highest-grossing Spanish release in 2022 already after its first (4-day) weekend in theatres.

== Reception ==
Fausto Fernández of Fotogramas rated the film 3 out of 5 stars assessing it to be "a comedy with a lot of angel", while pointing out that it was short in cameos.

Carlos Marañón of Cinemanía rated the film 2 out of 5 stars, deeming the third installment of the saga to be "flat, with some steep, colorful tacks, such as the small tribute to La gran familia".

Raquel Hernández Luján of HobbyConsolas scored 50 out of 100 points ("so-so"), criticising the "blatant product placement, the lack of substance in the story and the genre clichés", while drawing out the 2-year-old addition to the ensemble cast (featuring in some of the most endearing moments) as the best thing about the film.

Javier Ocaña of El País wrote that the "insignificant" film features "a monotonous rhythm, modest performances, little or no humor in the situations and no comic tempo in the dialogues, in the replies and counter-replies", being "simply as indolent as any Spanish production for children of the 1970s and 1980s".

== See also ==
- List of Spanish films of 2022
- List of Christmas films
