= Father There Is Only One 2 =

- Theatrical release poster
- Spanish: Padre no hay más que uno 2. La llegada de la suegra
- Directed by: Santiago Segura
- Produced by: Mercedes Gamero; María Luisa Gutiérrez; Santiago Segura
- Starring: Santiago Segura; Toni Acosta; Leo Harlem; Silvia Abril
- Music by: Roque Baños
- Production companies: Bowfinger International Pictures; Atresmedia Cine; Mamá se fue de viaje la película AIE
- Distributed by: Sony Pictures
- Release date: 29 July 2020
- Country: Spain
- Language: Spanish
- Box office: €12.9 million

Father There Is Only One 2 (Spanish: Padre no hay más que uno 2: La llegada de la suegra) is a 2020 Spanish comedy film directed by Santiago Segura, which also stars in alongside Toni Acosta, Leo Harlem, and Silvia Abril. It is the second installment of the Father There Is Only One film series. It was the highest-grossing Spanish film of 2020.

== Plot ==
Although Javier seems to have now everything under control in the family, things do no stay that way. A new pregnancy in the family and the arrival of the mother-in-law ensue.

== Cast ==
- Santiago Segura as Javier
- Toni Acosta as Marisa
- Leo Harlem as Paco
- Silvia Abril as Carmen
- Martina D'Antiochia as Sara
- Calma Segura as Carlota
- Luna Fulgencio as Rocío
- Carlos G. Morollón as Dani
- Sirena Segura as Paula
- Loles León as Milagros
- Wendy Ramos as Rosaura

Cristina Pardo, Nuria Fergó, Lorena Berdún, Sara Escudero, María del Monte and Sieteex make cameo performances.

== Production ==
The screenplay was penned by Santiago Segura and Marta González de la Vega. The film is a Bowfinger International Pictures, Atresmedia Cine and Mamá se fue de viaje la película AIE. Shooting wrapped on 4 March 2020. Shooting locations included the Madrid region and the provinces of Guadalajara and Toledo.

== Release ==
Distributed by Sony Pictures, the film was theatrically released on 29 July 2020 (a Wednesday). The film grossed €2.14 million in its first 5 days, with some theatres still closed because of COVID-19. It became the highest-grossing Spanish release of 2020, with €12.9 million.

== Reception ==
Raquel Hernández Luján of HobbyConsolas scored out of 45 out of 100 points ("bad"), considering that the sequel "repeats all the problems of the first film", but with the aggravating factor that it has nothing to tell, only rebounding a little with the "extremely powerful" comic flair of Loles León.

Fausto Fernández of Fotogramas rated the film 4 out of 5 stars, deeming it to be a superior sequel, highlighting Loles León's performance, which the reviewer found reminiscent of Ethel Merman's in It's a Mad, Mad, Mad, Mad World.

Andrea G. Bermejo of Cinemanía rated the film 3 out of 5 stars, finding the sequel to be less fun than the first film, even if Loles León's comic flair is all over the place.

== See also ==
- List of Spanish films of 2020
