= Kim Manning =

American actress and dancer (born 1960)

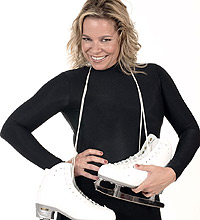
- Kim Manning in 2006.
- Born: Kimberley Fionna Manning; May 7, 1960 (age 64); California, United States
- Occupation(s): Presenter, actress and dancer
- Years active: 1983–present
- Known for: Un, dos, tres... responda otra vez
- Notable work: Manos a la obra The Cheetah Girls 2

Kimberley Fiona Manning (born May 7, 1960, in California), better known as Kim Manning, is an American TV presenter, actress and dancer who has developed her career in Spain.

== Career ==
=== Presenter ===
She became popular in Spain through the game-show Un, dos, tres... responda otra vez, where she was one of the team of secretaries, a team of girls who co-hosted the show and did dancing and musical Broadway-like performances each episode. Manning became the secretary who did the highest number of episodes among all secretaries in the history of the show, 131 episodes in 4 seasons, starting on May 20, 1983, and ending on January 4, 1988. She became popular in Spain for the complicated choreographies she performed and for her outgoing and talkative personality when she spoke with the main host Mayra Gómez Kemp and the contestants. She eventually got the part of lead accountant secretary from November 9, 1987, being the only foreign accountant secretary in the show's running time. She is still one of the most remembered secretaries that appeared in the show.

In 1992, she co-hosted with Fernando Carrillo the daily magazine El show de la una in TVE-1.

=== Actress ===
After returning for some years to America to study acting and doing some minor roles on Broadway, she returned to Spain to focus on her career as an actress, appearing in an episode of Farmacia de guardia and being her most renowned role in Manos a la obra, in Antena 3, where she played, from 1997 to 2001, Tanya, a polish worker who assisted Manolo (Ángel de Andrés) and Benito (Carlos Iglesias). In 2003, she appeared in another Antena 3 series, London Street, where she played Mrs. Robinson, a Londoner housewife that takes in the main character, played by Fernando Ramallo.

In August 2006, she appeared in The Cheetah Girls 2, a Disney Channel original movie, where she played Lola Durán. That same year, in October, she participated in the Spanish talent show Desafío bajo cero, where she showcased her ice skating background, finishing in third place.

From 1992, Manning managed a restaurant named Cornucopia, located in Madrid.

She returned to America at the end of the 2000s. Nowadays, she resides in Phoenix, Arizona, where she works as an acting teacher for children at the Childsplay Theatre Company.

== Filmography ==
Herself:

- 1983-1988: Un, dos, tres... responda otra vez
- 1992-1995: El show de la una
- 2006: Desafío bajo cero

As Actress:

- 1992-1995: Farmacia de guardia as Alice.
- 1998-2001: Manos a la obra as Tanya.
- 2000: Punto de mira as Teacher.
- 2002-2005: Bellas durmientes as Rebecca.
- 2003: London Street as Mrs. Robinson
- 2006: The Cheetah Girls 2 as Lola Durán.
- 2015: Velvet
