= Manos a la obra =

Spanish television series

- Genre: Comedy
- Created by: Vicente Escrivá; Ramón de Diego
- Starring: Ángel de Andrés; Carlos Iglesias; Fernando Cayo; Jorge Calvo; Nuria González; Kim Manning; Carmen Rossi; Evaristo Calvo
- Country of origin: Spain
- Original language: Spanish
- No. of seasons: 6
- No. of episodes: 130

Production
- Production companies: Aspa Vídeo; Acanto Cine & Vídeo

Original release
- Network: Antena 3
- Release: 8 January 1998 – 22 July 2001

Related
- Manolo y Benito Corporeision

Manos a la obra is a Spanish comedy television series starring Ángel de Andrés and Carlos Iglesias that originally aired on Antena 3 from 1998 to 2001.

== Premise ==
The fiction follows the mishaps of a duo of clumsy and lazy bricklayers, Manolo and Benito.

== Cast ==
- Ángel de Andrés as Manuel "Manolo" Jumilla Pandero.
- Carlos Iglesias as Benito Lopera Perrote.
- Fernando Cayo as Faustino "Tino" Ormaechea.
- Jorge Calvo as Protestato "Tato" Leal Jumilla.
- Nuria González as Adela Castañeja.
- Kim Manning as Tania Biezka Salianova.
- Carmen Rossi as Carmina Perrote Torres.
- Evaristo Calvo as Evaristo.
- Silvia Marsó as Noelia.
- Jesús Vázquez as Tony.
- Luis Varela as Luciano.
- Mónica Cano as Loren.
- Mónica Cervera as Nico.
- Tomás Sáez as Antonio.
- Mariana Carballal as Rosalía.

== Production and release ==
The series was created by Vicente Escrivá and Ramón de Diego. José Antonio Escrivá (Vicente Escrivá's son) directed the series until he was ditched in 1999 in favour of Carlos Serrano and Pablo Ibáñez. It was produced by Aspa Vídeo and Acanto Cine & Vídeo.

The series premiered on Antena 3 on 8 January 1998. The original broadcasting run ended on 22 July 2001 after 6 seasons and 130 episodes. It averaged 4,186,000 viewers and a 28.4% audience share. It sparked a sequel series, Manolo y Benito Corporeision, which premiered in 2006.
