= Alimañas =

- Theatrical release poster
- Directed by: Pep Antón Gómez; Jordi Sánchez
- Written by: Pep Antón Gómez; Jordi Sánchez
- Produced by: Juan Moreno; Guillermo Sempere; Koldo Zuazua
- Starring: Jordi Sánchez; Carlos Areces; Sílvia Abril; Loles Léon; Carmina Barrios; Pilar Bergés; Antonio Resines
- Cinematography: Juan Molina Temboury
- Edited by: Azucena Baños
- Music by: Isabel Royán
- Production companies: Feelgood; Kowalski Films; Goblin Audiovisual; Alimañas AIE
- Distributed by: Sony Pictures Entertainment
- Release dates: 20 October 2023 (CLAM); 27 October 2023 (Spain)
- Country: Spain
- Language: Spanish
- Box office: €1.2 million

Alimañas (lit. 'Vermin') is a 2023 Spanish black comedy film written and directed by Pep Antón Gómez and Jordi Sánchez which stars Sánchez, Carlos Areces, Sílvia Abril, Loles Léon, and Carmina Barrios.

== Plot ==
The plot follows two brothers (Carlos and Paco) hoping for their mother to die so they can inherit an apartment building in the centre of Madrid.

== Cast ==
- Jordi Sánchez as Paco
- Carlos Areces as Carlos
- Sílvia Abril as Mari Ángeles
- Loles Léon as Nieves
- Carmina Barrios as Chita
- Pilar Bergés as Margarita
- Antonio Resines

== Production ==
The film is a Feelgood, Kowalski Films, Goblin Audiovisual, and Alimañas AIE production, with the association of Sony Pictures International Productions, the participation of RTVE, Movistar Plus+, and Canal Sur and funding from the Madrid regional administration and ICAA.

== Release ==
Included as a late addition to the slate of the Manresa-based CLAM Festival, Alimañas premiered on 20 October 2023. Distributed by Sony Pictures Entertainment, it was released theatrically in Spain on 27 October 2023.

== Reception ==
Enid Román Almansa of Cinemanía rated the film 2½ out of 5 stars, deeming it to be "made for fans of the actors and no one else".

Pablo Vázquez of Fotogramas rated the film 3 out of 5 stars, describing it as "morally sordid, minimalist, nihilistic, uncomfortable and dark as a rat's belly, sometimes coarse and often insidious".

== See also ==
- List of Spanish films of 2023
