= Amor de hombre =

Amor de Hombre
- Directed by: Yolanda García Serrano; Juan Luis Iborra
- Written by: Yolanda García Serrano; Juan Luis Iborra
- Starring: Loles León; Andrea Occhipinti; Pedro Mari Sánchez; Armando Del Río
- Distributed by: TLA Releasing
- Release date: 1997
- Running time: 88 min.
- Country: Spain
- Language: Spanish

Amor de hombre (also known as Love of a Man in English-speaking markets) is a 1997 Spanish gay-themed drama film directed by Yolanda García Serrano and Juan Luis Iborra. The close friendship between a gay man and a straight woman is challenged when another man enters the picture, and the friends each fall for him.

The film won both the Audience and Jury awards at the Miami Gay and Lesbian Film Festival and Narrative Feature at the Austin Gay & Lesbian Film Festival.

== Plot ==
In Madrid, Ramón is a single gay man and a lawyer, searching for a long-term partner. His best friend, Esperanza, is a single woman and a teacher who struggles to find a man to date and, despite her affection for Ramón, harbors some jealousy for his sex life. She sets Ramón up with her coworker, PE teacher Roberto, which goes almost too well. The relationship between the two men starts to endanger the precious bond these Ramón and Esperanza have formed.

== Cast ==
- Loles León as Esperanza
- Andrea Occhipinti as Ramón
- Pedro Mari Sanchez as César
- Armando Del Rio as Roberto

== Awards ==
Freedom Award - 2000 Outfest
Audience & Jury Award for Best Feature - 1999 Miami LG Film Festival
Best Narrative Feature - 1998 Austin GL Film Festival

== Festivals ==
1999 Miami Lesbian & Gay Film Festival
1999 Philadelphia Gay and Lesbian Film Festival
23rd San Francisco LGBT Film Festival
