= El corazón del océano =

Spanish television series

- Genre: Historical drama; Adventure
- Based on: El corazón del océano by Elvira Menéndez
- Directed by: Pablo Barrera; Guillermo Fernández Groizard
- Starring: Hugo Silva; Ingrid Rubio; Clara Lago; Álvaro Cervantes; Ferran Villajosana; Víctor Clavijo; María Cantuel; Hiba Abouk; Ane Gabarain
- Country of origin: Spain
- Original language: Spanish
- No. of seasons: 1
- No. of episodes: 6

Production
- Running time: c. 70 min
- Production companies: Antena 3 Films; Globomedia

Original release
- Network: Antena 3
- Release: 27 January – 5 March 2014

El corazón del océano is a Spanish period drama television series that originally aired on Antena 3 from January to March 2014. It stars Hugo Silva, Ingrid Rubio, Clara Lago and Álvaro Cervantes, among others.

== Premise ==
Set in the 16th century, the fiction follows the story of 80 maidens who were sent by the Hispanic Crown to the New World (Asunción) to marry settlers and thus avoid miscegenation, experiencing an odyssey on the high seas and beyond.

== Cast ==
- Hugo Silva as Juan de Salazar.
- Ingrid Rubio as Mencía Calderón.
- Lala Aguirre as Clarita de Sanabría.
- Clara Lago as Ana de Rojas.
- Álvaro Cervantes as Alonso.
- Ferrán Vilajosana as Pelayo.
- Hiba Abouk as Guadalupe.
- María Cantuel as María Sanabria.
- Víctor Clavijo as Hernando de Trejo.
- Ane Gabarain as Sancha.
- Vida Torres as Pola.
- Anasol as Abana.
- Ilja Rosendahl as Ulrico Schmidels.
- Juan David Agudelo as Fray Carrillo.
- Marian Zapico as Isabel Contreras.
- Didier van der Hove as Francisco Becerra.
- Daniel Holguín as Rui Peña.
- Dani Herrera as Bernardí.
- Raúl Gutiérrez as Maese Pedro.
- Albi De Abreu as Capitán Bompere.

== Production and release ==
Produced by Antena 3 Films in collaboration with Globomedia, El corazón del océano is an adaptation of the novel of the same name by Elvira Menéndez. The screenplay was written by Manuel Valdivia together with Pablo Barrera, Chus Vallejo, César Vidal Gil and Elena González de Sande. Following a time of shooting in several Colombian cities, production moved to El Puerto de Santa María, Andalusia. Filming wrapped in Huelva in July 2011. Pablo Barrera and Guillermo Fernández Groizard directed the series.

Consisting of 6 episodes with an accumulated running time of 420 minutes, El corazón del océano was presented at the FesTVal in August 2011. It premiered in prime time on Antena 3 on 27 January 2014. The unexpected release of Velvet on 17 February forced a reschedule from Monday to Wednesday. The broadcasting run ended on 5 March 2014, averaging 2.5 million viewers and a 13.2% audience share.

Series	Episodes	Originally released			Viewers	Share (%)	Ref.
Series	Episodes	First released	Last released	Network	Viewers	Share (%)	Ref.
1	6	27 January 2014	5 March 2014	Antena 3	2,500,000	13.2	

No.	Title	Original release date
1	"El Viejo Mundo"	27 January 2014
2	"El corazón de la tormenta"	3 February 2014
3	"La travesía de la Mar Océana"	10 February 2014
4	"El Nuevo Mundo"	19 February 2014
5	"De encuentros y desencuentros"	26 February 2014
6	"El corazón de la selva"	5 March 2014
