= Hiba Abouk =

Spanish actress (born 1986)

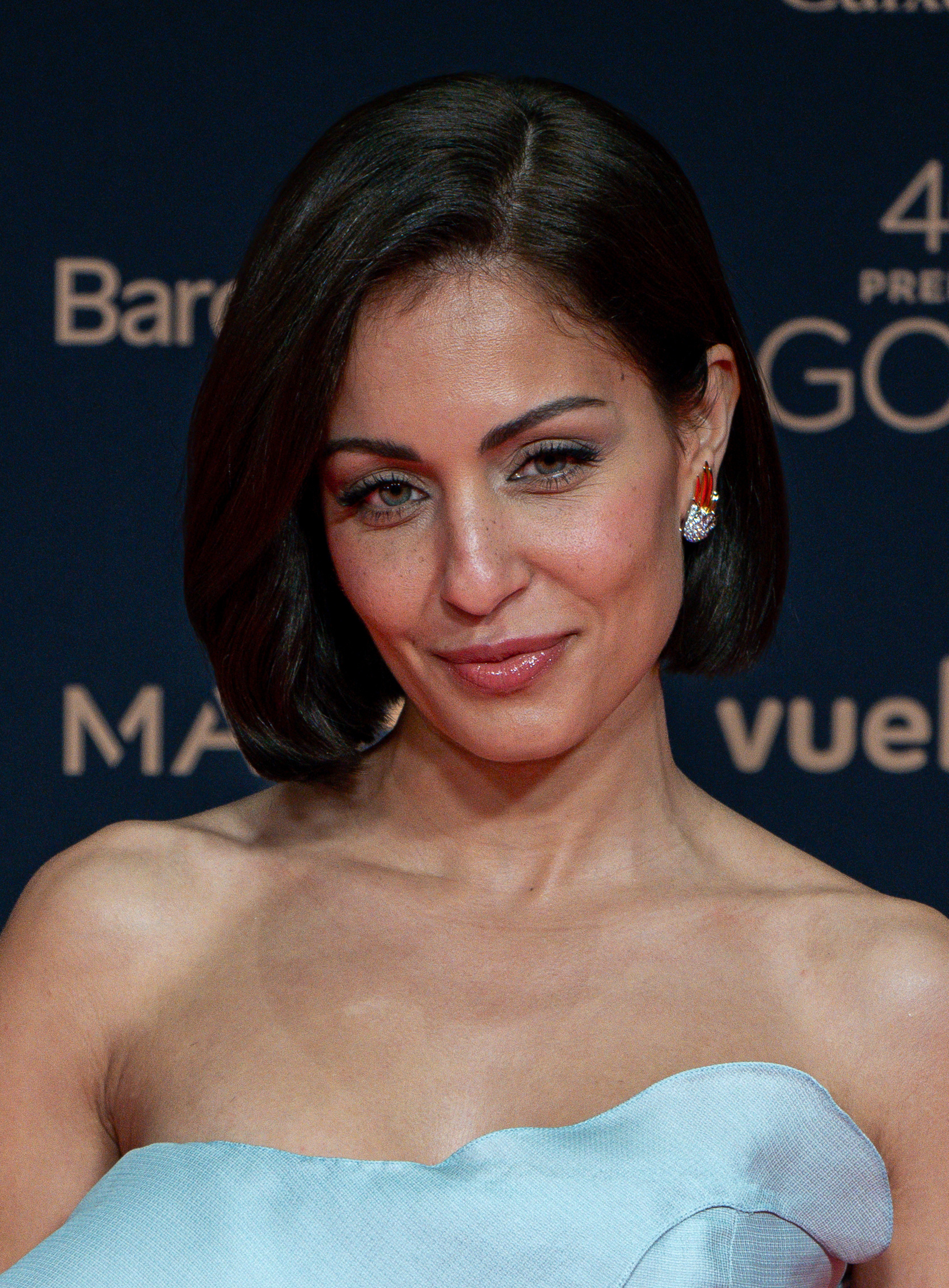
- Abouk in 2026
- Born: Hiba Aboukhris Benslimane; 30 October 1986 (age 39); Madrid, Spain
- Education: RESAD
- Occupation: Actress
- Years active: 2008–present
- Spouse: Achraf Hakimi (m. 2020; div. 2023)
- Children: 2

Hiba Aboukhris Benslimane (Arabic: هبة أبوخريص بنسليمان; born 30 October 1986), known professionally as Hiba Abouk, is a Spanish actress known for her roles in television series, such as Candela in Con el culo al aire (2012–2013) and her first leading role as Fátima in El Príncipe (2014–2016), which earned her a nomination for Best TV Actress at the Iris Awards.

== Biography ==
Hiba Aboukhris Benslimane was born in Madrid on 30 October 1986, the youngest of four siblings. She was born to Tunisian parents, and her father was of Libyan origin and had a Romani great-grandfather. Her parents had earlier settled in Spain after emigrating from Tunisia. Hiba is passionate about Flamenco. She studied at the French Lycée in Madrid until age 18. Later she studied Arabic philology, and earned a licentiate degree in drama from the RESAD.

Abouk landed her television debut in a minor role in an episode of El síndrome de Ulises in 2008, but her acting career did not fully take off until 2010, when she featured in television series La isla de los nominados. It was followed by television credits in Cheers, El corazón del océano, El Príncipe (her first leading role), Con el culo al aire, and Madres.

== Personal life ==
Abouk married Moroccan footballer Achraf Hakimi in 2020. They have two sons. In March 2023, Abouk announced their divorce. Between 2024 and 2025, she had a brief relationship with businessman Antonio Revilla.

Abouk celebrates Eid al-Fitr. She speaks five languages: Spanish, Arabic, English, Italian, and French.

== Filmography ==
=== Films ===
Year	Title	Character	Director	Notes
2012	Pegada a tu almohada	Marisa	Mari Navarro	
2014	Historias de Lavapiés	Rachida	Ramón Luque	
2014	Terre brulee	Hiba		Short film
2017	Proyecto tiempo	Alba	Isabel Coixet	
2019	Malek	Shoreh		
2020	Caribe: todo incluído	Alicia	Miguel García de la Calera	
2021	Manos libres	Laura		Short film

=== Television ===
Year	Title	Character	Notes
2008	El Síndrome de Ulises	Hiba	1 episode
2010	La isla de los nominados	Eva Lys	11 episodios
2011	Cheers	Ágata	1 episode
2012–2013	Con el culo al aire	Candela Prieto Soriano	26 episodes
2014	El corazón del océano	Guadalupe	6 episodes
2014–2016	El Príncipe	Fátima Ben Barek	31 episodes
2021	Madres. Amor y vida	Raquel Gutiérrez	8 episodes
2021	J'ai tué mon mari	Laure	6 episodes
2024	Eva & Nicole	Eva Faruk	8 episodes
2025	La agencia	Herself	2 episodes
