= Summer Vacation (2023 film) =

- Theatrical release poster
- Spanish: Vacaciones de verano
- Directed by: Santiago Segura
- Written by: Marta González de Vega; Santiago Segura
- Produced by: Santiago Segura; María Luisa Gutiérrez
- Starring: Santiago Segura; Leo Harlem; Patricia Conde; Cristina Gallego
- Production companies: Bowfinger International Pictures; Chapuzas Audiovisuales AIE
- Distributed by: Sony Pictures Entertainment Iberia
- Release date: 6 July 2023
- Country: Spain
- Language: Spanish

Summer Vacation (Spanish: Vacaciones de verano) is a 2023 Spanish comedy film directed by Santiago Segura which stars Segura, Leo Harlem, Cristina Gallego, and Patricia Conde.

== Plot ==
In Summer vacation time, divorced buddies Óscar and Félix apply for a temporary job as children's entertainers at a hotel, bringing in their own children so they can manage work-life interface.

== Cast ==
- Leo Harlem as Óscar
- Santiago Segura as Félix
- Patricia Conde
- Cristina Gallego
- Sirena Segura
- Javier García
- Hugo Simón
- Daniela Pintado

== Production ==
The film was written by Marta González de Vega and Santiago Segura. It is a Bowfinger International Pictures and Chapuzas Audiovisuales AIE production, with the participation of Netflix and Atresmedia, in association with Mogambo. It was shot in Tenerife in late 2022.

== Release ==
Distributed by Sony Pictures Entertainment Iberia, the film was released theatrically in Spain on 6 July 2023. It made a €1,079,026 gross in its opening weekend (good for a 2nd position at the Spanish box office after Indiana Jones and the Dial of Destiny), with a total of €1,296,375 (198,140 admissions) adding Thursday 6 figures.

== Reception ==
Rubén Romero Santos of Cinemanía rated the film 3 out of 5 stars, underscoring it to be Santiago Segura's most successful film in a long time.

Fausto Fernández of Fotogramas rated the film 4 out of 5 stars, deeming it to be perhaps the best-rounded of the Santiago Segura films belonging to the director's all-audience era.

== See also ==
- List of Spanish films of 2023
