= Crossing the Border (film) =

- Spanish: Un franco, 14 pesetas
- Directed by: Carlos Iglesias
- Screenplay by: Carlos Iglesias; Central de Guiones
- Produced by: José Manuel Lorenzo; Eduardo Campoy
- Starring: Carlos Iglesias; Javier Gutiérrez; Nieve de Medina; Isabel Blanco
- Cinematography: Tote Trenas
- Edited by: Luisma del Valle
- Music by: Mario de Benito
- Production companies: Drive Cine; Adivina Producciones
- Distributed by: Alta Classics
- Release dates: 19 March 2006 (Málaga); 5 May 2006 (Spain)
- Country: Spain
- Language: Spanish

Crossing the Border, also known as Crossing Borders (Spanish: Un franco, 14 pesetas; lit. 'One Franc, 14 Pesetas') is a 2006 Spanish comedy-drama film directed by Carlos Iglesias, who also stars in alongside Javier Gutiérrez, Nieve de Medina and Isabel Blanco.

== Plot ==
Set in the 1960s, the plot concerns the economic migration of two Spaniards from Spain to Switzerland.

== Cast ==
- Carlos Iglesias as Martín
- Javier Gutiérrez as Marcos
- Nieve de Medina as Pilar
- Isabel Blanco as Hanna
- Iván Martín as Pablito
- Tim Frederic Quast as Pablo

== Production ==
The screenplay was penned by Carlos Iglesias with the collaboration of 'Central de Guiones'. The film was produced by Drive Cine and Adivina Producciones, with the participation of TVE.

== Release ==
The film screened at the 9th Málaga Film Festival's main competition in March 2006. Distributed by Alta Classics, it was theatrically released in Spain on 5 May 2006.

== Reception ==
Jonathan Holland of Variety wrote that "combining gentle comedy, social crit and sentimentality into an enjoyable and surprisingly spiky whole", the film "is a traditional heartwarmer with enough contempo edge to keep it from looking merely old-fashioned", also noting the "exuberant" performances.

Mirito Torreiro of Fotogramas rated the film 3 out of 5 stars, assessing that while it is a tad too tearjerking, yet it is also effective and honest, also pointing out "at its unusual narrative solidity and a superb technical craft".

== Accolades ==
Year	Award	Category	Nominee(s)	Result	Ref.
2007	62nd CEC Medals	Best Film		Nominated	
2007	62nd CEC Medals	Best Original Screenplay	Carlos Iglesias	Nominated	
2007	21st Goya Awards	Best New Director	Carlos Iglesias	Nominated	
2007	5th Mestre Mateo Awards	Best Film		Won	
2007	5th Mestre Mateo Awards	Best Director	Carlos Iglesias	Won	
2007	5th Mestre Mateo Awards	Best Actor	Carlos Iglesias	Nominated	
2007	5th Mestre Mateo Awards	Best Actress	Isabel Blanco	Won	
2007	5th Mestre Mateo Awards	Best Actress	Nieve de Medina	Nominated	
2007	5th Mestre Mateo Awards	Best Supporting Actor	Miguel de Lira	Nominated	
2007	5th Mestre Mateo Awards	Best Supporting Actress	Feli Manzano	Nominated	
2007	5th Mestre Mateo Awards	Best Screenplay	Carlos Iglesias	Won	
2007	5th Mestre Mateo Awards	Best Score	Mario de Benito	Nominated	
2007	5th Mestre Mateo Awards	Best Cinematography	Tote Trenas	Nominated	
2007	5th Mestre Mateo Awards	Best Editing	Luisma del Valle	Nominated	
2007	5th Mestre Mateo Awards	Best Production Supervision	Jesús Alonso	Won	
2007	5th Mestre Mateo Awards	Best Art Direction	Enrique Fayanás	Nominated	
2007	5th Mestre Mateo Awards	Best Makeup and Haistyles	Óscar Aramburo, Sara Márquez	Won	
2007	5th Mestre Mateo Awards	Best Costume Design	José María de Cossío, Puy Uche	Nominated	

== See also ==
- List of Spanish films of 2006
