= Brigada Costa del Sol =

Spanish TV series

- Genre: Serial drama
- Created by: Pablo Barrera; Juanjo García; Fernando Bassi
- Starring: Hugo Silva; Álvaro Cervantes; Miki Esparbé; Jesús Castro; Sara Sálamo
- Country of origin: Spain
- Original language: Spanish
- No. of seasons: 1
- No. of episodes: 13

Production
- Production location: Spain
- Running time: approx. 70 minutes
- Production companies: Mediaset España; WBITVP España

Original release
- Network: Telecinco
- Release: May 6 – July 22, 2019

Brigada Costa del Sol (or Drug Squad: Costa del Sol in English) is a Spanish drama television series produced by Mediaset España and Warner Bros. International Television Production España with the participation of Netflix. Starring Hugo Silva, Álvaro Cervantes, Miki Esparbé, Jesús Castro, and Sara Sálamo, it was presented to the media on April 3, 2019, and its premiere took place on May 6, 2019, on Spanish networks Telecinco and Cuatro.

== History ==
On May 28, 2018, Mediaset Spain and Netflix announced they had reached an agreement to produce their first series together, with Warner Bros. ITVP Spain as co-producer. The names of the main cast of the series were also confirmed, including Hugo Silva, Álvaro Cervantes, Miki Esparbé, Jesús Castro, and Sara Sálamo. Recording began on June 7 in Málaga Province and concluded in early February 2019. Brigada Costa del Sol was one of the only Spanish series to be selected for the MIPDrama MIPTV 2019 event.

The first season became available worldwide in its entirety on Netflix on October 25, 2019.

== Plot ==
In 1977, a group of police detectives with limited resources, but a lot of ingenuity and courage, is picked to form a special drug-fighting brigade in Torremolinos on the Costa del Sol. The series is based on the true story of the Grupo Especial de Estupefacientes Costa del Sol, one of Spain's first anti-narcotics squads.

== Cast ==
- Hugo Silva – Bruno López
- Álvaro Cervantes – Leo Villa
- Miki Esparbé – Martín Pulido
- Jesús Castro – Terrón
- Sara Sálamo – Yolanda "Owlet"

=== Secondary ===
- Jorge Usón – Reyes
- Cayetana Cabezas – Marielena
- Pablo Béjar – Chino (Episode 1 - Episode 2 - Episode 3 - Episode 4 - Episode 5 - Episode 6 - Episode 7; Episode 9 - Episode 10 - Episode 11 - Episode 12 - Episode 13)
- Marco Cáceres – Franchi (Episode 1 - Episode 2; Episode 4; Episode 6 - Episode 8; Episode 10 - Episode 13)
- Olivia Delcán – Vicky López
- Jorge Suquet – Cristóbal Peña (Episode 1 - Episode 3; Episode 6 - Episode 8)
- Daniel Holguín – Atilano Peña (Episode 1 - Episode 3; Episode 5 - Episode 13)
- Joaquín Galletero – Lucas
- Carolina Yuste – Sole
- Ana Fernández – Alicia (Episode 1 - Episode 4; Episode 6 - Episode 13)
- Camino Fernández – Charo

=== Guests ===
- Manolo Caro – Dandy (Episode 1 - Episode 2; Episode 8)
- Paco Marín – Inspector Cifu (Episode 1 - Episode 9; Episode 11 - Episode 12)
- Nieve de Medina – Gloria (Episode 3; Episode 6; Episode 12)
- Julián Villagrán – Fredo (Episode 4 - Episode 6)
- Pepón Nieto – Emilio Tortajada (Episode 6)
- Joaquín Núñez – Roque (Episode 8 - Episode 13)
- Adrià Collado – Evaristo (Episode 9; Episode 12)
- Unax Ugalde – Edi (Episode 9 - Episode 13)
- Javier Albalá – ¿? (Episode 11)

== Seasons and episodes ==
The series premiere took place simultaneously on the two main channels of the Mediaset España group on May 6, 2019. For the premiere, a special broadcast filling all of prime time combined the first and the second chapter as if they were a film of about 135 minutes, which was seen by 1,706,000 viewers (12.7% share) on Telecinco and 763,000 (5.7%) on Cuatro. The remaining 11 episodes that make up the first season aired in their usual format on Telecinco.

Season	Episodes	Premiere	Final	Audience	
Season	Episodes	Premiere	Final	Viewers	Share
1	13	May 6, 2019	July 22, 2019	1,286,000	9.6%

=== Season 1 (2019) ===
No.	Title	Directed by	Written by	Original release date	Audience
1 2	"Mentiras"	Norberto López Amado	Pablo Barrera and Alberto Macías	May 6, 2019	2,469,000 (18.4%)
3	"El diablo en las tripas"	Miguel Alcantud	Pablo Barrera and Alberto Macías	May 13, 2019	1,644,000 (11.6%)
4	"Morir solo"	Iñaki Peñafiel	Pablo Barrera, Alberto Macías and Chus Vallejo	May 20, 2019	1,445,000 (10.4%)
5	"Fuego"	Iñaki Peñafiel	Pablo Barrera, Alberto Macías and Carlos Molinero	May 27, 2019	1,622,000 (11.5%)
6	"El infierno de los burlangas"	Alberto Ruiz Rojo	Pablo Barrera, Alberto Macías and Nico Romero	June 3, 2019	1,401,000 (10.4%)
7	"Hasta pronto, Torremolinos"	Alberto Ruiz Rojo and Fernando Bassi	Pablo Barrera, Alberto Macías and Carlos Molinero	June 10, 2019	1,341,000 (9.8%)
8	"El ruido de los truenos"	Miguel Alcantud	Pablo Barrera, Alberto Macías and Carlos Molinero	June 17, 2019	1,358,000 (10.6%)
9	"Espejismo"	Miguel Alcantud	Pablo Barrera, Alberto Macías and Nico Romero	June 24, 2019	1,373,000 (10.3%)
10	"30 de noviembre"	Marco A. Castillo	Pablo Barrera, Alberto Macías and Chus Vallejo	July 1, 2019	1,163,000 (9,3%)
11	"1 de diciembre"	Marco A. Castillo	Pablo Barrera, Alberto Macías, Nico Romero and Jorge Hernández	July 8, 2019	1,054,000 (7,8%)
12	"Pata negra"	Fernando Bassi	Alberto Macías, Pablo Barrera and Carlos Molinero	July 15, 2019	1,026,000 (8.4%)
13	"Los que caminan solos"	Fernando Bassi	Pablo Barrera, Alberto Macías and Nico Romero	July 22, 2019	820,000 (7.0%)
