= Ten Days Without Mom =

- Argentine theatrical release poster
- Spanish: Mamá se fue de viaje
- Directed by: Ariel Winograd
- Screenplay by: Mariano Vera
- Story by: Juan Vera
- Produced by: Juan Lovece; Juan Vera; Juan Pablo Galli; Christian Faillace
- Starring: Diego Peretti; Carla Peterson
- Cinematography: Félix Monti (ADF)
- Edited by: Pablo Barbieri (SAE)
- Music by: Darío Eskenazi
- Production company: Patagonik
- Distributed by: Buena Vista International
- Release date: 6 July 2017 (Argentina)
- Running time: 90 minutes
- Country: Argentina
- Language: Spanish
- Box office: $10,772,207

Ten Days Without Mom (Spanish: Mamá se fue de viaje) is a 2017 Argentine comedy film directed by Ariel Winograd and starring Diego Peretti and Carla Peterson.

== Plot ==
Vera Garbo, a saturated housewife, takes a vacation and moves away from her family, consisting of her husband Victor, who lives only for work, and their four children. Now that she is not with them, the family realizes how much they need her.

== Cast ==
- Diego Peretti as Víctor Garbo, manager of a department store chain and family man.
- Carla Peterson as Vera Garbo, a housewife who takes care of the thousand and one details of the day-to-day dynamics.
- Martín Lacour as Bruno Garbo, the teenage son.
- Agustina Cabo as Lara Garbo, the daughter.
- Julián Baz as Tato Garbo, the youngest son.
- Lorenzo Winograd as Lolo Garbo, the baby.
- Pilar Gamboa as Julia.
- Guillermo Arengo as Pol.
- Martín Piroyansky as Di Caprio.
- Maruja Bustamante as Pachano.
- Muriel Santa Ana as Elena.
- Mario Alarcón as Grinberg.
- Miriam Odorico as Lidia.
- Sandra Villani as Suni.
- Laura Laprida as Di Caprio's wife.
- Lali Espósito as Magazine Model.

== Trailer ==
On 11 May 2017, a second preview or trailer for the film was released confirming that the release date in Argentina would be July 6 2017, according to production company Patagonik.

== Remakes ==
The film has been remade in Spain as Father There Is Only One (2019), which has yielded a film series of four sequels; in Italy as When Mom Is Away (2019), which has yielded a first and second sequel; and in France as 10 jours sans maman (2020), which has yielded a sequel.
