= RESAD =

Coordinates: 40°24′39.7″N 3°40′30.9″W

Real Escuela Superior de Arte Dramático
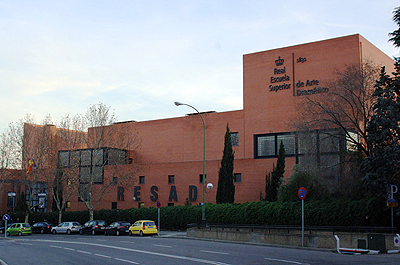
- Avenida de Nazaret, 2, Madrid, Spain

Information
- Other name: RESAD
- Type: Drama school
- Established: May 1831 (as Escuela de Declamación Española)
- Website: www.resad.es

The Real Escuela Superior de Arte Dramático (RESAD, transl. Royal Higher College of Performing Arts) is a drama school in Madrid, Spain.

== History ==
It traces its origins back to the foundation of the Escuela de Declamación Española (transl. Spanish Declamation School) in May 1831. Proposed by Francesco Piermarini, director of the Real Conservatorio de Música María Cristina, the school was initially integrated within the Conservatory, founded a year earlier. The 1857 Moyano Law conferred the status of higher studies to the studies in the school.

The RESAD opened its premises in the Niño Jesús neighborhood in Madrid, next to El Retiro, in October 1996. The RESAD offers three specialisations: 'Stage Direction & Dramaturgy' (dirección escénica y dramaturgia), 'Scenography Design' (escenografía), and 'Acting' (interpretación).

== Notable alumni ==
- Francisco Ortiz (born 1986), actor
- Hiba Abouk (born 1986), actress
