= Con el culo al aire =

Spanish television series

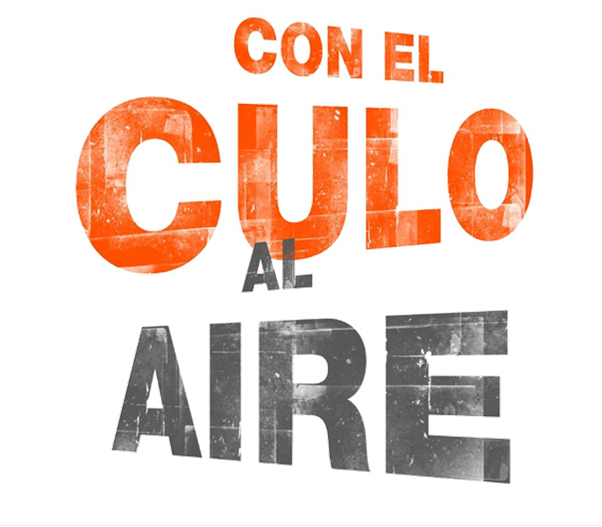
- Genre: Comedy
- Country of origin: Spain
- Original language: Spanish
- No. of seasons: 3
- No. of episodes: 42

Production
- Production company: Notro TV

Original release
- Network: Antena 3
- Release: 1 February 2012 – 16 July 2014

Con el culo al aire (lit. 'With Your Ass In The Air') is a Spanish television sitcom set in a camping site. Comprising 3 seasons and 42 episodes, it aired from February 2012 to July 2014 on Antena 3.

== Premise ==
The fiction follows the mishaps of a group of people living in an urban camping site in La Cabrera, in the north of the Madrid region.

== Cast ==
- Paco Tous as Tino.
- María León as Sandra.
- Toni Acosta as Sonsoles.
- Raúl Arévalo as Jorge.
- Raúl Fernández as Ángel.
- Natalia Roig as Alicia.
- Henar Jiménez as Dulce.
- Goizalde Núñez as Lola.
- Hiba Abouk as Candela.
- Víctor Palmero as Dani.
- Iñaki Miramón as José Luis.
- Cesáreo Estébanez as Serafín.
- Selica Torcal as Juana.
- Vicente Romero as Chema.
- Carmen Ruiz as Eli.
- Jesse Johnson as Bobby.

Introduced in season 2

- Janfri Topera as Paulino.
- Ana Wagener as Charo.
- Javier Antón as Roberto

Introduced in season 3

- Llum Barrera as Chus.
- Julián López as Rubén.
- Ana Morgade as Begoña.

== Production and release ==
Produced by Grupo Vértice 360's Notro TV, the 13-episode first season premiered Antena 3 on 1 February 2012 and it and ended airing on 16 May 2012, averaging 3,211,000 viewers and a 17.3% audience share. The second season (also featuring 13 episodes), aired from to 17 April 2013 to 10 July 2013, roughly maintained the viewership figures of the first season, with 3,035,000 viewers and a 17.0% share. The series' viewership figures experienced a decrease in the third and final season (aired from 12 March 2014 to 16 July 2014), with 2,417,000 viewers and a 13.5% audience share averaged across its 16 episodes, slightly above the channel's average.

Series	Episodes	Originally released			Viewers	Share (%)	Ref.
Series	Episodes	First released	Last released	Network	Viewers	Share (%)	Ref.
1	13	1 February 2012	16 May 2012	Antena 3	3,211,000	17.3	
2	13	17 April 2013	10 July 2013	Antena 3	3,035,000	17.0	
3	16	12 March 2014	16 July 2014	Antena 3	2,417,000	13.5	

== Awards and nominations ==
Year	Award	Category	Nominee(s)	Result	Ref.
2013	63rd Fotogramas de Plata	Best TV Actor	Raúl Arévalo	Nominated	
2014	64th Fotogramas de Plata	Best TV Actor	Raúl Arévalo	Won	
