= Sara Sálamo =

Spanish actress

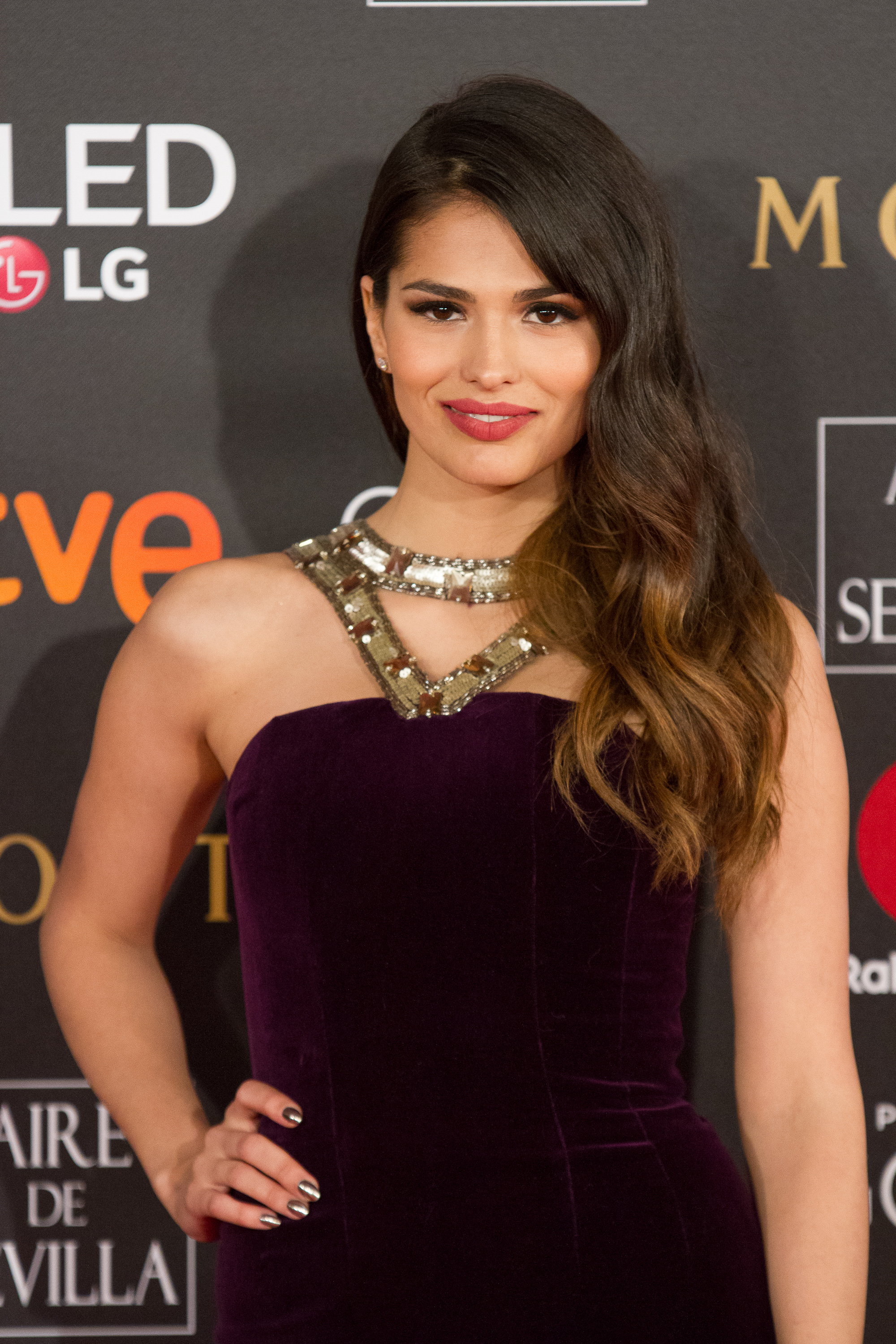
- At the 32nd Goya Awards in 2018
- Born: Sara Ainhoa Concepción Sálamo; 20 January 1992 (age 34); Santa Cruz de Tenerife, Canary Islands, Spain
- Occupations: Actress, animal rights activist
- Partner: Isco (2017–present)
- Children: 2

Sara Ainhoa Concepción Sálamo (born 20 January 1992) is a Spanish actress known for her performance in television series such as Arrayán, B&b, de boca en boca and Brigada Costa del Sol.

== Life and career ==
Sara Ainhoa Concepción Sálamo was born on 20 January 1992 in Santa Cruz de Tenerife, in the Canary Islands. Following her participation in a short film authored by her father at age 11, she developed an interest in performing arts. She moved to Madrid at age 18 to pursue a career as an actress. In 2012, she had her television debut with a minor role in the television series Toledo, cruce de destinos, temporarily moving to Málaga to star in the Andalusian regional soap opera Arrayán.

In 2013, Sálamo made her feature film debut with the film Three-60, a teen movie in which she performed a student of Fine Arts. She featured in supporting roles in series such as La que se avecina, Aída, Con el culo al aire and Águila Roja. Her first major role in national television was her performance as Cayetana in the workplace dramedy B&b, de boca en boca, which aired from 2014 to 2015 in Telecinco. By 2017, she entered a relationship with footballer Isco Alarcón, with whom she had had two children.

She featured in the 2018 films Perdida and Everybody Knows, also starring as "La Buhíta" in the 2019 crime series Brigada Costa del Sol set in the Costa del Sol.

Self-described as "actress, feminist and animal rights activist", Sálamo has been engaged in online controversies pitting her against pro-bullfighting pressure groups.

== Filmography ==
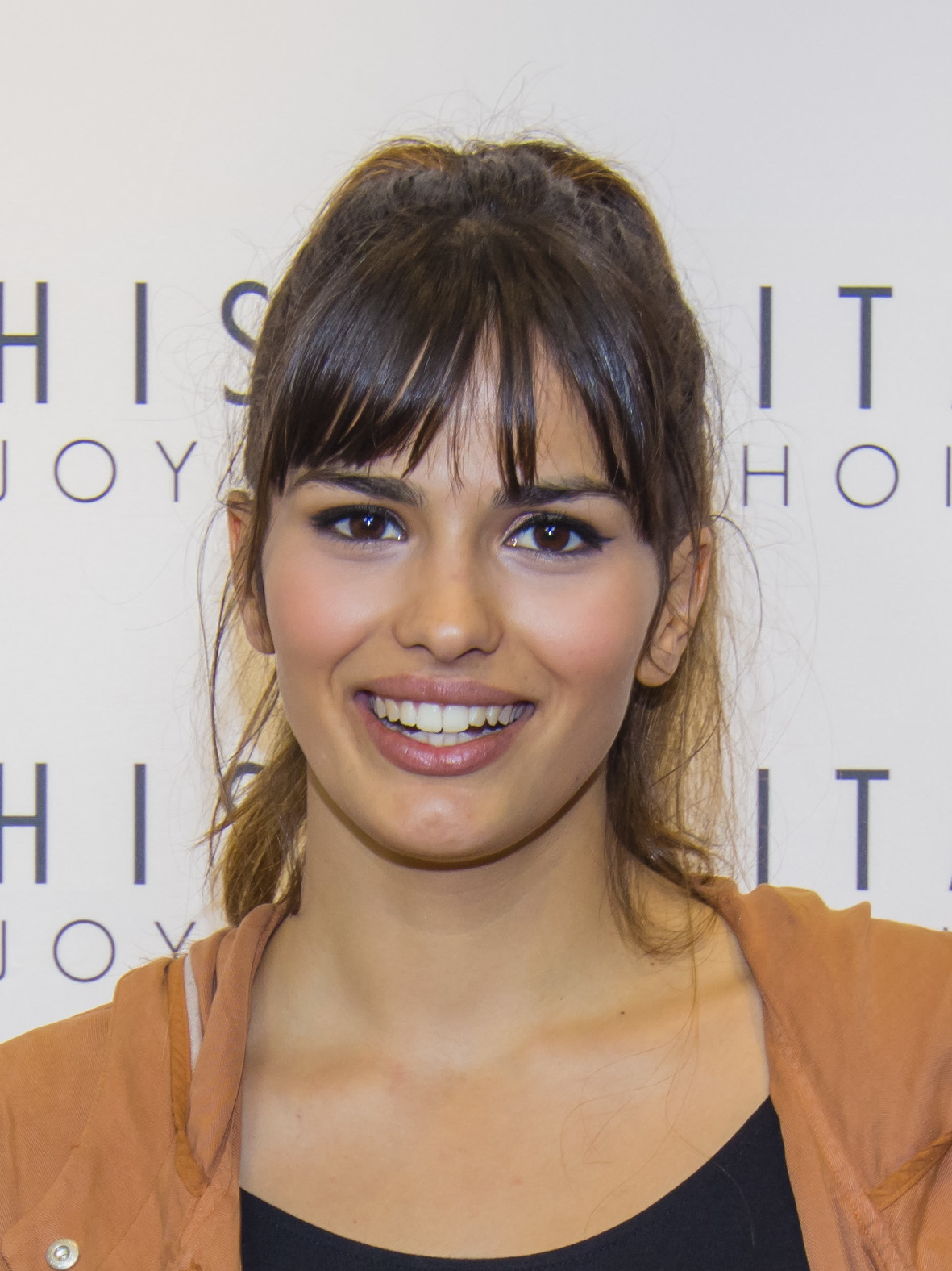
Sara Sálamo in 2016

=== Film ===
Year	Title	Role	Notes	Ref.
2013	Tres 60 (Three-60)	Daniela		
2017	Como la espuma (Like Foam)	Elisa		
2018	Las grietas de Jara (Dark Buildings (A Crack in the Wall))	Leonor		
2018	Todos lo saben (Everybody Knows)	Rocío		
2018	Perdida	Claudia Marini		
2020	El año de la furia (The Year of Fury)	Jenny		
2021	El refugio (Our (Perfect) Xmas Retreat)	Alex		
2023	Strange Way of Life	Conchita	Short film	
2023	El favor (Just One Small Favor)	Aura		
2024	Al otro barrio (From Good to the Hood)	Sara		

=== Television ===
Year	Title	Role	Notes	Ref.
2012	Toledo, cruce de destinos	Violante de Aragón (young)	Guest	
2012	Arrayán	Esther Machado	Main	
2014–15	B&b, de boca en boca	Cayetana	Main	
2017	La que se avecina	Olivia	Guest	
2018	Olmos y Robles	Doctora Aguilar		
2019	Brigada Costa del Sol	Yolanda, "La Buhíta"	Main	
2020	Relatos con-fin-a-dos	Sandra	Anthology miniseries. Episode: "Selftape"	
