= Luna Fulgencio =

Spanish actress (born 2011)

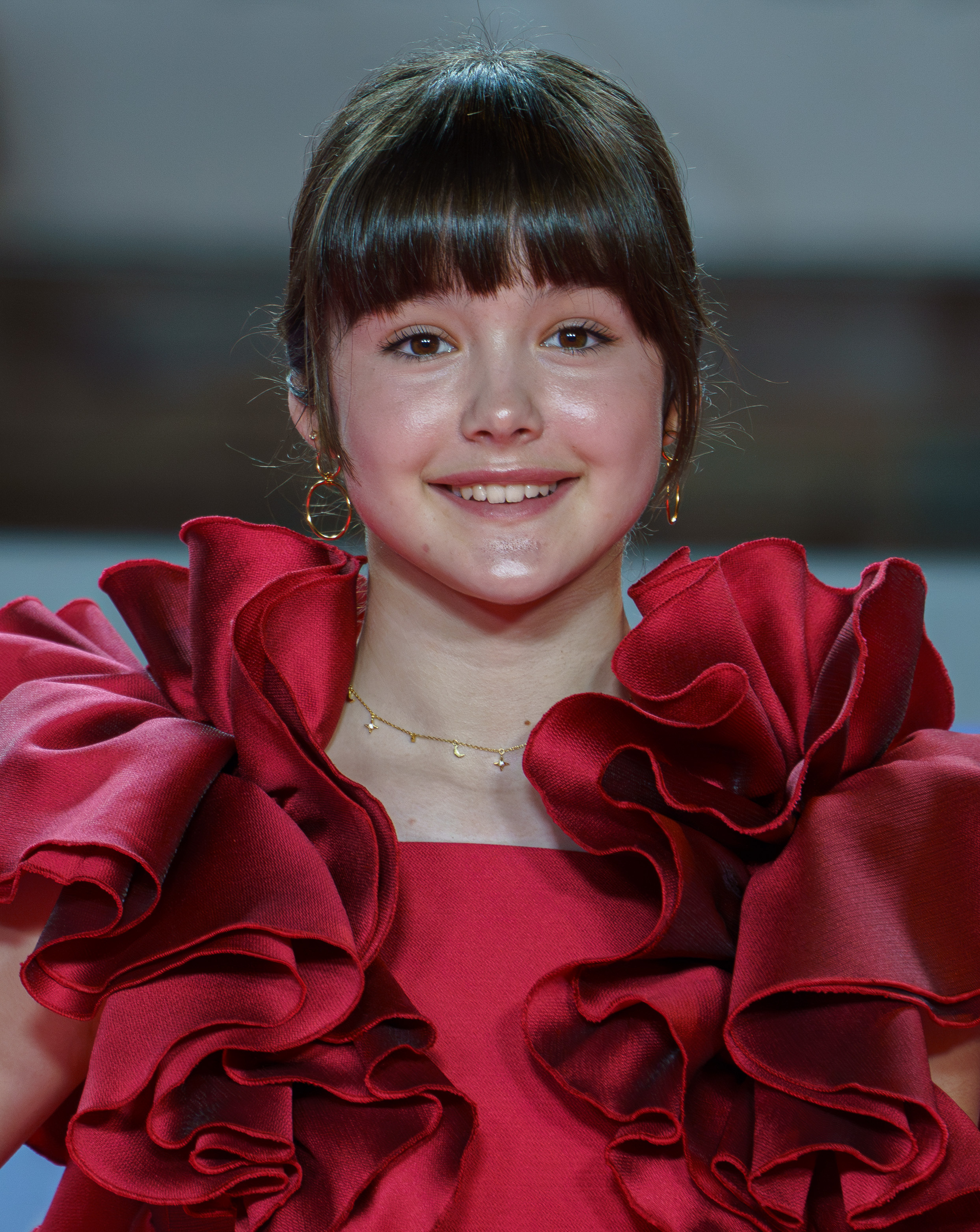
- Fulgencio in 2025
- Born: Luna Fulgencio Sánchez; 5 February 2011 (age 15); Madrid, Spain
- Occupation: Actress
- Years active: 2016–present

Luna Fulgencio Sánchez (born 5 February 2011) is a Spanish actress who became known for playing the role of Rocío in the films Padre no hay más que uno (2019) and its sequels, directed by Santiago Segura, in addition to her multitudinous appearances in Spanish television series.

== Biography ==
Luna Fulgencio was born in Madrid on 5 February 2011 as the youngest daughter of Rubén Fulgencio and Laura Sánchez, who, in addition to being her mother, is her agent. She has a brother, two years older than her, named Rubén Fulgencio, who is also dedicated to the world of acting.

== Career ==
She began in the world of acting in 2016, in an episode of El ministerio del tiempo. A year later, she starred in the Telecinco series Ella es tu padre. In 2019 she joined the cast of El embarcadero on Movistar+, alongside Álvaro Morte, Irene Arcos and Verónica Sánchez. In cinema, she had her first participation in Oriol Paulo's feature film Durante la tormenta (2018). A year later, she starred in Santiago Segura's blockbuster Padre no hay más que uno (2019), in addition to its sequel Padre no hay más que uno 2: La llegada de la suegra (2020), where she became especially recognized.

In 2021 she starred in Macarena Astorga's La casa del caracol and Santiago Segura's ¡A todo tren!Destino Asturias, in addition to signing on as the protagonist of the film Héroes de barrio, by Ángeles Reiné, where she plays Paula. That same year she participated in the TVE series La caza.Tramuntana and starred in the fictions Besos al aire (Star) and Supernormal (Movistar+). In the summer of the same year, she began filming El refugio, a Christmas comedy directed by Macarena Astorga, where she shares the screen with Loles León, María Barranco, Antonio Dechent and Leo Harlem, among others, which premiered that same Christmas. She also published Los sueños de Luna Fulgencio, by HarperKids.

In 2022 she had a special participation in the comedy film El test directed by Dani de la Orden. She also returned to her role as Rocío for the third part of the film Padre no hay más que uno and it was announced that she had signed up for the feature film Lobo Feroz by Gustavo Hernández.

== Filmography ==
=== Cinema ===
| Year | Title | Character | Directed by |
|---|---|---|---|
| 2018 | Durante la tormenta | Gloria Ortiz | Oriol Paulo |
| 2019 | Padre no hay más que uno | Rocío García Loyola | Santiago Segura |
| 2020 | Padre no hay más que uno 2 | Rocío García Loyola | Santiago Segura |
| 2021 | La casa del caracol | Rosita | Macarena Astorga |
| 2021 | ¡A todo tren! Destino Asturias | Lara | Santiago Segura |
| 2021 | El refugio | Martina | Macarena Astorga |
| 2022 | El test | Inés | Dani de la Orden |
| 2022 | Héroes de barrio | Paula | Ángeles Reiné |
| 2022 | Padre no hay más que uno 3 | Rocío García Loyola | Santiago Segura |
| 2022 | A Todo Tren 2: Sí, les ha pasado otra vez | Lara | Inés de León |
| 2023 | El hombre del saco | Sara | Ángel Gómez Hernández |
| 2023 | Lobo feroz | Matilde (Kid) | Gustavo Hernández |
| 2024 | Padre no hay más que uno 4 | Rocío García Loyola | Santiago Segura |

=== Television ===
| Year | Title | Channel | Character | Duration |
|---|---|---|---|---|
| 2016 | El ministerio del tiempo | La 1 | Julita | 1 episode |
| 2017–2018 | Ella es tu padre | Telecinco / FDF | Nora Roales Martín | 13 episodes |
| 2019–2020 | El embarcadero | Movistar+ | Soledad «Sol» León Alfaro | 10 episodes |
| 2020 | La valla | Antena 3 | Julia Pérez Noval (Kid) | 3 episodes |
| 2020 | Desaparecidos | Telecinco / Prime Video | Zaina Ocaña | 1 episode |
| 2020–2022 | Nasdrovia | Movistar+ | Hija Policía | 9 episodes |
| 2021 | La caza.Tramuntana | La 1 | Sara Campos (Kid) | 5 episodes |
| 2021 | Besos al aire | Star / Telecinco | Virginia | 2 episodes |
| 2021 – present | Supernormal | Movistar+ | Jimena | 6 episodes |
| 2022 | Entrevías | Telecinco | Kid | 1 episode |

== Awards and nominations ==
| Year | Award | Category | Result | Ref. |
|---|---|---|---|---|
| 2021 | Villanueva Showing Talent | The career path of a promising young woman | Won | |
