= Get Her... If You Can =

- Theatrical release poster
- Spanish: ¿Qué te juegas?
- Directed by: Inés de León
- Screenplay by: Astrid Gil-Casares; Rafa Russo; Pablo Alén; Breixo Corral
- Story by: Astrid Gil-Casares
- Produced by: Gabriel Arias Salgado; Santiago Segura; Maria Luisa Gutiérrez
- Starring: Leticia Dolera; Amaia Salamanca; Javier Rey; Mariam Hernández; Daniel Pérez Prada; Brays Efe; Santiago Segura
- Cinematography: Miguel P. Gilaberte
- Edited by: Verónica Callón
- Music by: Alfonso González Aguilar
- Production companies: Movistar+; Bowfinger International Pictures; Ajedrez Para Tres AIE
- Distributed by: A Contracorriente Films
- Release dates: 21 March 2019 (Málaga); 29 March 2019 (Spain)
- Country: Spain
- Language: Spanish

Get Her... If You Can (Spanish: ¿Qué te juegas?) is a 2019 Spanish screwball comedy film directed by Inés de León from a screenplay by Astrid Gil-Casares, Rafa Russo, Pablo Alén, and Breixo Corral starring Leticia Dolera, Amaia Salamanca, and Javier Rey.

== Plot ==
Roberto, Fernando and Daniela are three millionaire siblings and scions of a shipping company. Vying to dethrone his sister Daniela's position in the company, Roberto schemes a plan involving hiring stand-up comedian Isabel to woo her through comedy, upending both siblings' value systems.

== Cast ==
- Leticia Dolera as Isabel
- Amaia Salamanca as Daniela
- Javier Rey as Roberto Allende Salazar
- Mariam Hernández as Alexia
- Daniel Pérez Prada as Fernando
- Brays Efe as Álex
- Santiago Segura as Luis
- Goizalde Núñez as Maite
- Walter Orellana as Yuma

== Production ==
The film was produced by Bowfinger International Pictures, Ajedrez Para Tres AIE, and Movistar+, with the association of Alwin Films and Cindy Teperman. It was shot in Madrid and Gran Canaria.

== Release ==
The film was presented at the Málaga Film Festival on 21 March 2019. Distributed by A Contracorriente Films, it was released theatrically in Spain on 29 March 2019.

== Reception ==
Jordi Costa of El País lamented that "the accumulation of supposedly sardonic lines" hints at "the mannerist effort of a writing team more concerned with effect than with the naturalness of the whole".

Juan Pando of Fotogramas rated the film 3 out of 5 stars, writing that "with some hiccups in its rhythm, [it] achieves, as it progresses, a balance between comedy and emotion".

Sergio F. Pinilla of Cinemanía described the film as a "bold and not entirely effective screwball comedy".

Eulàlia Iglesias of El Confidencial celebrated that the game of seduction between two women was part of the romantic conflict while pointed out that the portrayal of the wealthy protagonists was not mean enough.

Alfonso Rivera of Cineuropa lamented that "the plot holds few surprises and takes some narrative shortcuts that stretch the suspension of disbelief a little too far".

== See also ==
- List of Spanish films of 2019
