= Leo Harlem =

Spanish comedian and late-blooming actor

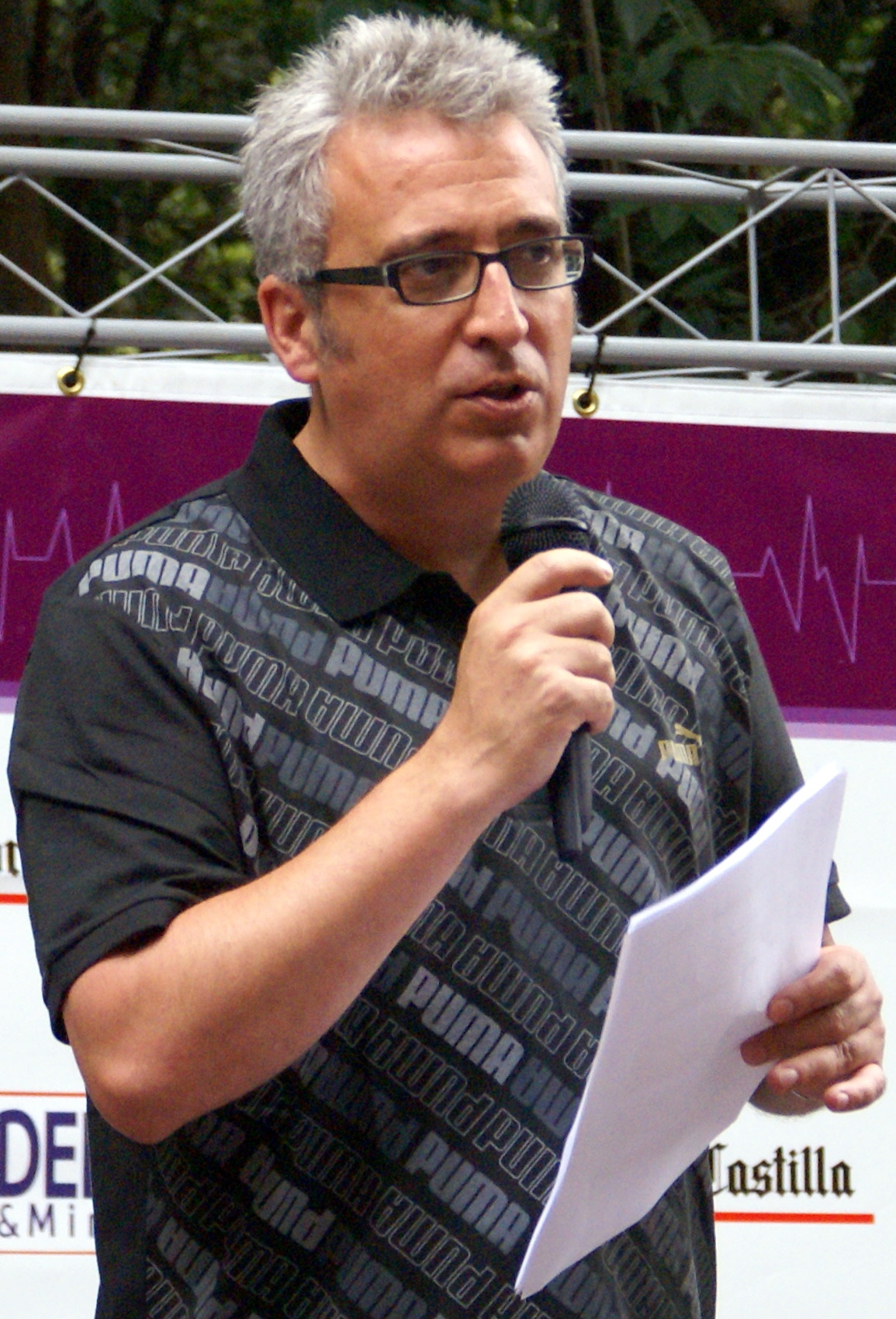
- (2009)
- Born: Leonardo González Feliz; 16 November 1962 (age 63); Matarrosa del Sil, Spain
- Occupations: Actor; stand-up comedian

Leonardo González Feliz (born 16 November 1962), better known as Leo Harlem, is a Spanish comedian and actor.

== Biography ==
Leonardo González Feliz (his real name) was born in Matarrosa del Sil (province of León) on 16 November 1962, and moved to Valladolid with his family when he was a child. Following a participation in a El Club de la Comedia's monologue contest in 2001, he moved to Madrid to pursue a career as a comedian. He has since featured in comedy shows such as La hora de José Mota, Cómicos, algo más que los mejores monólogos, Antena3's El club del chiste and Zapeando.

He made his feature film debut as an actor at age 52, featuring in a cameo performance in Santiago Segura's Torrente 5: Operación Eurovegas. After featuring in A Stroke of Luck in a supporting role playing the Mayor of the village where the fiction takes place in, Harlem landed his first lead role in 2018 comedy The Best Summer of My Life, playing Curro, a sleazy salesman who promises his son an unforgettable vacation.

== Filmography ==
Leo Harlem' film credits
| Year | Title | Role | Notes | Ref(s) |
|---|---|---|---|---|
| 2014 | Torrente 5: Operación Eurovegas | Vindicative camera control | Cameo appearance | |
| 2016 | Villaviciosa de al lado | Anselmo | | |
| 2018 | The Best Summer of My Life | Curro | | |
| 2019 | Father There Is Only One | Uncle Paco | | |
| 2019 | Off Course to China | Emilio | | |
| 2020 | The Wedding Unplanner | Don Emilio | | |
| 2020 | Superagente Makey | José Miguel "Makey" | | |
| 2020 | Father There Is Only One 2 | Uncle Paco | Reprise of role in Padre no hay más que uno | |
| 2021 | The Kids Are Alright | Felipe | | |
| 2021 | Our (Perfect) Xmas Retreat | Luismi | | |
| 2022 | Father There Is Only One 3 | Uncle Paco | Reprise of role in Padre no hay más que uno 2 | |
| 2022 | Por los pelos, una historia de autoestima | Mateo | | |
| 2024 | The Kids Are Alright 2 | Felipe | Reprise of role in A todo tren. Destino Asturias | |
| 2023 | How to Become a Modern Man | Andrés Cuadrado | | |
| 2023 | Vacaciones de verano | Oscar | | |
| 2024 | Uncle Trouble | Toni | | |
| 2024 | Father There Is Only One 4 | Uncle Paco | Reprise of role in Padre no hay más que uno 3 | |
| 2025 | Father There Is Only One 5 | Uncle Paco | Reprise of role in Padre no hay más que uno 4 | |
