= Toni Acosta =

Spanish actress

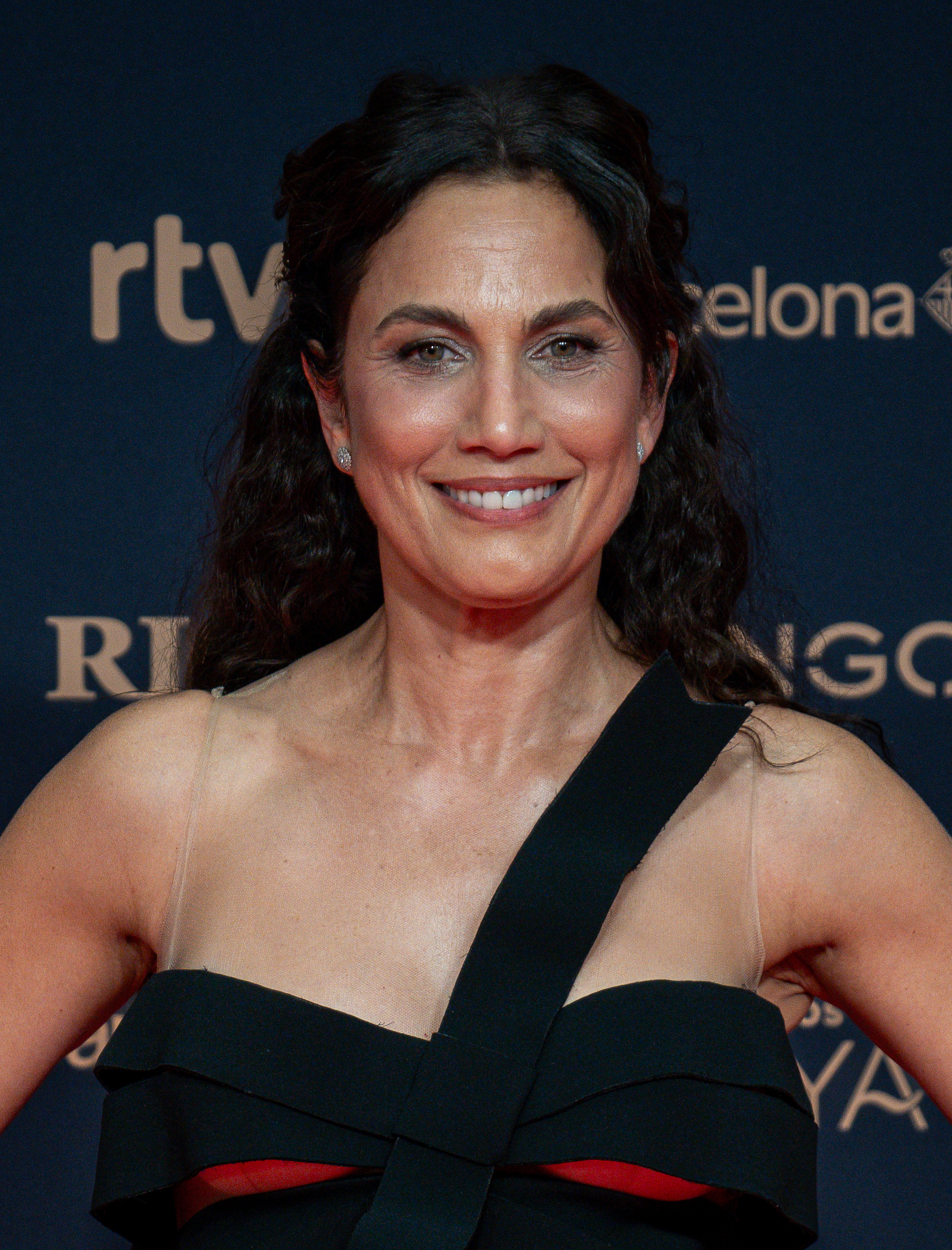
- Acosta in 2026
- Born: Antonia del Carmen Acosta León; 10 April 1972 (age 54); San Cristóbal de la Laguna, Spain
- Occupation: Actress
- Years active: 1996–present
- Spouse: Jacobo Marthos (2002–2015)
- Children: 2
- Awards: Winner of Best supporting actress for 7 Citas in the 12ª edition of Festival de Málaga.

Antonia del Carmen Acosta León (born 10 April 1972), better known as Toni Acosta, is a Spanish actress.

== Biography ==
Antonia del Carmen Acosta León was born in San Cristóbal de la Laguna (in the island of Tenerife) on 10 April 1972. Her parents are Arsenio Acosta and Sebastiana León. She worked mainly in television, where she played a policewoman in the series Policías, en el corazón de la calle. She later played the role of Jacinta Jiménez "J.J." in the series about dancers Un paso adelante. She had made fewer appearances on stage.

In 2002, she married Jacobo Martos, son of the singer Raphael and the writer Natalia Figueroa whom she met on the set of Policías, en el corazón de la calle. They have two children, Nicolás (2004) and Julia (2008). They got divorced in July 2015.

In 2010, she played a role in the unsuccessful superhero comedy series Supercharly of Telecinco.

From 2012 to 2014 she played the character role of Sonsoles, a snob woman who lives in a camping, in the comedy series Con el culo al aire in Antena 3. From 2015 to 2016 she had a role in the comedy series Gym Tony.

In 2019 she became one of the main characters of the TV series Señoras del (h)ampa in Telecinco.

== Filmography ==
=== Television ===
- Policías, en el corazón de la calle (2000-2003)
- Un paso adelante (2003–2005)
- Tirando a dar (2006)
- El síndrome de Ulises (2007–2008)
- Adolfo Suárez, el presidente (2010)
- Supercharly (2010)
- Con el culo al aire (2012–2014)
- Me resbala (2013–2015)
- Gym Tony (2015–2016)
- Señoras del (h)AMPA (2019–)

=== Films ===
- Cachito mío (2001), by Manuel Feijóo and Beatriz G. Cruz (short subject).
- Luz de domingo (2007), by José Luis Garci.
- 7 Minutos (2008), by Daniela Fejerman.
- Cuento de verano (2015), de Carlos Dorrego
- Tiempo sin aire (2015)
- Mi gran noche (2015), by Alex de la Iglesia.
- Incidencias (2015).
- Wild Oats (2016), by Andy Tennant
- Yucatán (2018) de Daniel Monzón
- Sin rodeos (2018) by Santiago Segura
- Los futbolísimos (2018) by Miguel Ángel Lamata
- Padre no hay más que uno (2019) as Marisa
- Padre no hay más que uno 2 (2020) as Marisa
- Padre no hay más que uno 3 (2022) as Marisa Loyola
- Phänomena (2023)
- Padre no hay más que uno 5 (2025) as Marisa Loyola

=== Theatre ===
- 5 mujeres.com (2002)
- Ana en el trópico (2005)
- El invierno bajo la mesa (2006)
- El método Grönholm (2007)
- Emma (2009)
- La gaviota (2012)
- Antígona (2013)
- De mutuo desacuerdo (2014)
- La estupidez (2016)

== Awards ==
- Finalist to Premios Max de teatro to best supporting actress for Ana en el trópico (2006).
- Finalist to Premio Mayte de teatro for El invierno bajo la mesa.
- Winner of Best supporting actress for 7 Citas in the 12ª edition of Festival de Málaga.
