= Inés de León =

Spanish film director and screenwriter

- Occupations: Film director; screenwriter; actress

Inés de León García de Vinuesa is a Spanish film director, screenwriter and actress. Her early work included the web series Inquilinos, music videos and the Fashion Drama shorts for Vogue Spain.

She made her feature directorial debut with ¿Qué te juegas? (2019), then directed and appeared in A todo tren 2 (2022) and wrote and directed the television series Padre no hay más que uno, la serie.

== Training and early career ==
De León studied film direction and then camera and lighting for cinema at Septima Ars. She also studied cinematography at ECAM; in 2013, she founded Freckles Films with Borja Álvarez Ramírez, a small production company that she and Álvarez ran together.

Her early credits included cinematography on Rómulo Aguillaume's No soy como tú and music videos for Amaral, Lori Meyers and Anni B Sweet; she also wrote, produced and directed the web series Inquilinos.

== Short films, fashion films and music videos ==
Her short film La carta was made for the 2016 Correos Film Festival, where she also served on the jury with Eduardo Casanova. For Vogue Spain, she directed Fashion Drama shorts with pastel colours and fashion imagery; she said the format allowed her to work closely on visual style. She also directed Spygramers, a three-minute film for Guerlain starring Blanca Suárez.

== Feature films and television ==
=== ¿Qué te juegas? ===
De León's first feature, the romantic comedy ¿Qué te juegas?, was written by Astrid Gil-Casares, Rafa Russo, Breixo Corral and Pablo Álen, and starred Leticia Dolera, Amaia Salamanca and Javier Rey. It was presented in the official section of the Málaga Film Festival on 21 March 2019 and released theatrically in Spain on 29 March.

De León said she sought rapid, ironic dialogue inspired by Ernst Lubitsch's To Be or Not to Be, and paid close attention to symmetrical framing, costumes, production design and cinematography. Reviewing the film in the same outlet, Eulàlia Iglesias welcomed the seduction plot between two women, but thought the portrait of the wealthy characters could have been more biting.

=== A todo tren 2 ===
De León directed and appeared in A todo tren 2, written by Santiago Segura and Marta González de Vega and starring Paz Vega and Paz Padilla; it was released in Spain on 2 December 2022.

=== Later work ===
Her fiction series project Tras la llama was selected for CIMA Impulsa 2024, a seven-month development programme. In 2026, she wrote Padre no hay más que uno, la serie with Raúl Navarro and Juan Manuel de Vega and co-directed its episodes with Navarro; starring Daniel Pérez Prada and Mariam Hernández, it premiered on Atresplayer on 25 January and used mockumentary techniques such as handheld camera work and direct-to-camera testimony.

== Awards ==
Her video for Buffetlibre's A Song for Elaine, featuring Peter von Poehl, was nominated in five categories, including best director, at the 2014 La Jolla Fashion Film Festival, and entered the official selection of the International Fashion Film Awards. In 2023, she received the Talent Award at the 13th Villanueva Showing Festival.
