= Carlos Iglesias =

Spanish actor and filmmaker

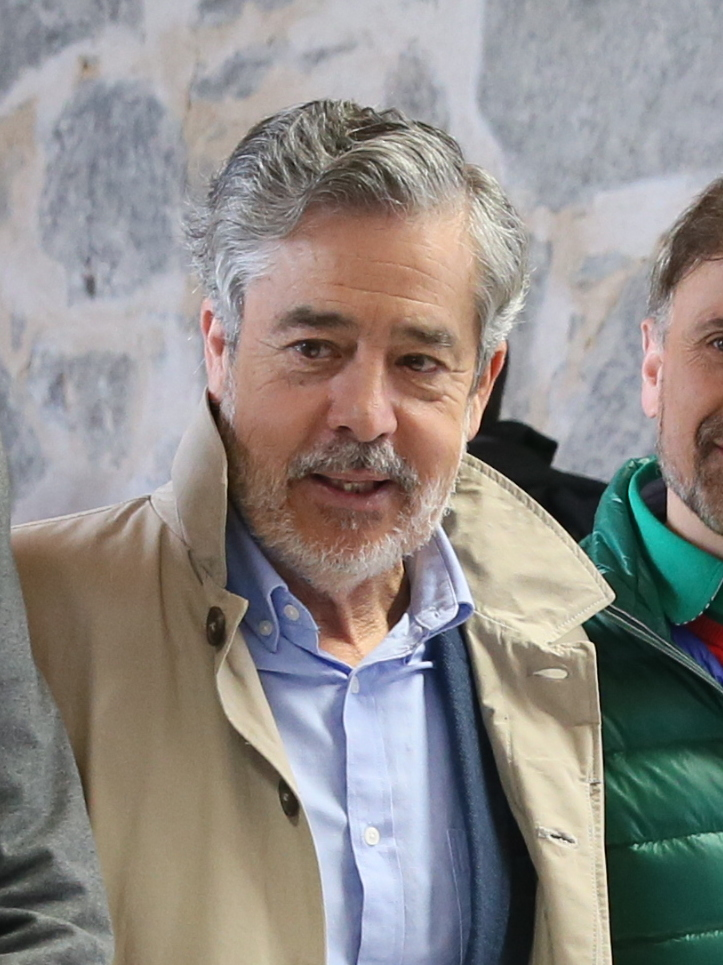
- (2019)
- Born: Carlos Iglesias Serrano; 15 July 1955 (age 71); Madrid, Spain
- Education: RESAD
- Occupations: Actor; film director; screenwriter

Carlos Iglesias Serrano (born 15 July 1955) is a Spanish actor and filmmaker. From 1998 to 2001, he starred as Benito in the comedy television series Manos a la obra, extremely popular for Spanish audiences throughout its broadcasting run.

== Biography ==
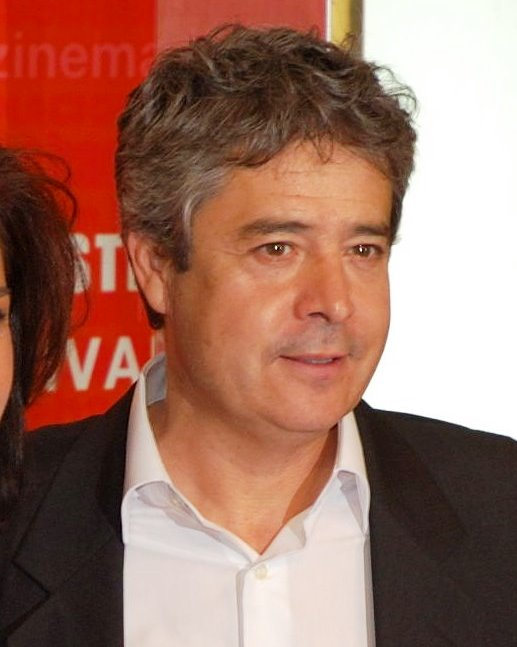
Iglesias attending a photocall at the San Sebastián International Film Festival.

Carlos Iglesias Serrano was born on 15 July 1955 in Madrid, living for a time with his family in Quintanar de la Orden. From 1960 to 1966, he lived in Switzerland, where his parents had immigrated. After returning to Spain, and living in Alicante and Madrid, he graduated from the RESAD.

He earned early public recognition in the 1990s for his appearances as 'Pepelu' in the late-night show Esta noche cruzamos el Mississippi.

He earned further recognition for his performance in Antena 3 comedy television series Manos a la obra (1998–2001), a massive audience hit that broke the 6 million viewers per episode mark, starring in a tandem alongside Ángel de Andrés, respectively portraying Benito Lopera and Manolo Jumilla, two clumsy and lazy bricklayers. The broadcasting run from 1998 to 2001 comprised 6 seasons and about 130 episodes.

Iglesias starred as Sancho Panza in Manuel Gutiérrez Aragón's 2002 film Don Quixote, Knight Errant, earning a nomination to the Goya Award for Best New Actor for his performance.

He returned as Benito alongside Ángel de Andrés in Manolo y Benito Corporeision (2006–2007), a revival of the popular duo that proved to be an audience failure owing to the worn-out plots, and was cancelled after 1 season of 12 episodes.

Iglesias made his feature film directorial debut with the 2006 immigration comedy-drama Crossing the Border (Un Franco, 14 pesetas), in which he also starred and took over writing duties. His second feature was Inspansi (¡Españoles!), whose plot also related to the Spanish diaspora. He also directed the sequel to Crossing the Border, 2 Francos, 40 pesetas, released in 2014.

== Film director ==
- 2006: Un Franco, 14 pesetas (Crossing the Border)
- 2011: Ispansi (¡Españoles!)
- 2014: 2 Francos, 40 pesetas
- 2020: La suite nupcial

== Accolades ==
Year	Award	Category	Work	Result	Ref.
2003	17th Goya Awards	Best New Actor	Don Quixote, Knight Errant	Nominated	
2007	21st Goya Awards	Best New Director	Crossing Borders	Nominated	
2015	24th Actors and Actresses Union Awards	Best Film Actor in a Leading Role	2 Francos, 40 pesetas	Nominated	
