= Loles León =

Spanish actress (born 1950)

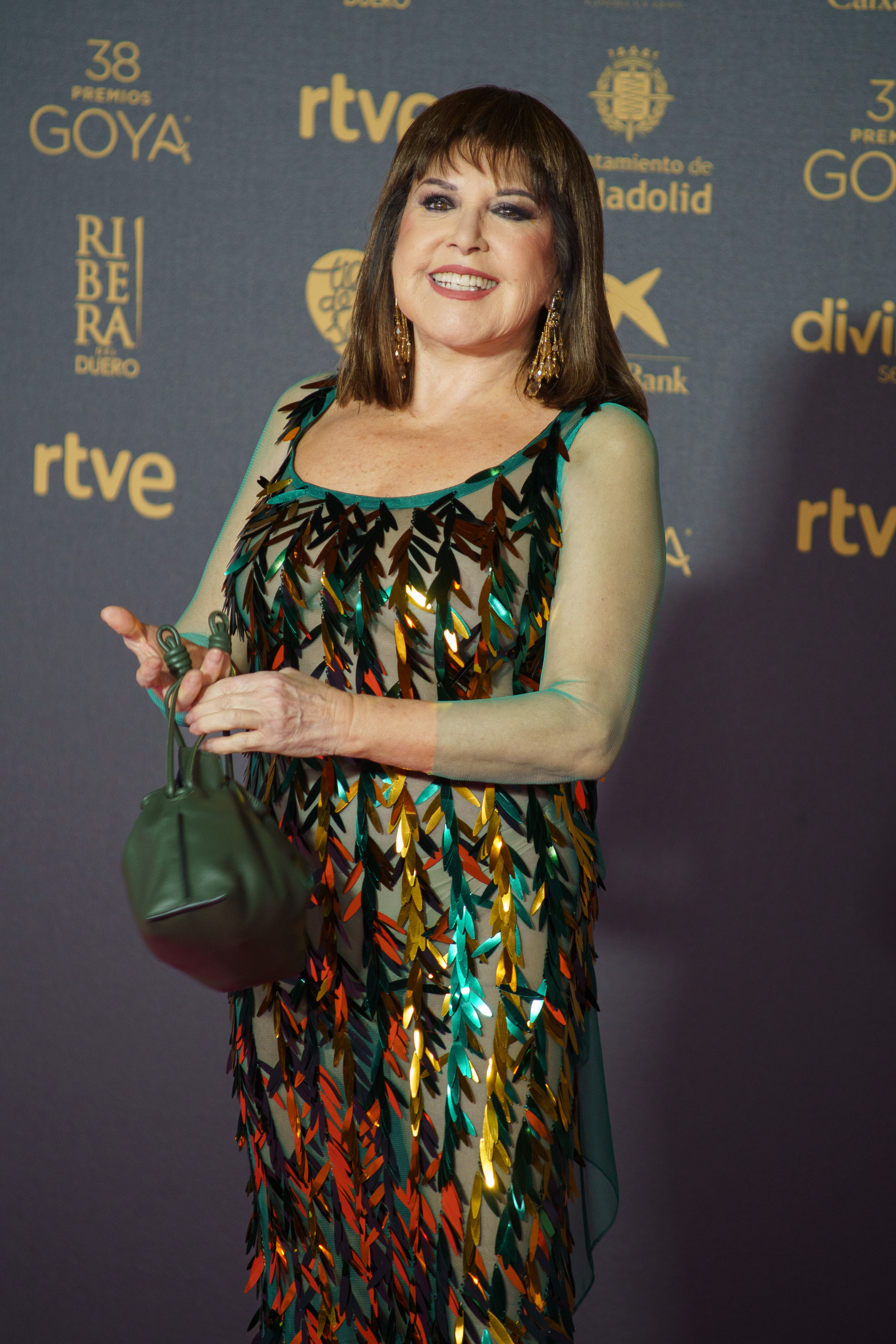
- León at the 38th Goya Awards in 2024
- Born: María Dolores León Rodríguez; 1 August 1950 (age 76); Barcelona, Spain
- Occupation: Actress

María Dolores "Loles" León Rodríguez (born 1 August 1950) is a Spanish actress.

== Career ==
A native of Barcelona, León travelled to Madrid to start a career as an actress, where she met Pedro Almodóvar during La Movida Madrileña. She has played in Women on the Verge of a Nervous Breakdown (1987), Tie Me Up! Tie Me Down! (1989), The Bilingual Lover (1993), and Libertarias (1996). In 1997, she had her first leading role in Amor de hombre, and played Paloma in Aquí no hay quien viva (2003). In 2016, she played Menchu in La que se avecina as Yoli's mother.

== Selected filmography ==
=== Film ===
Year	Title	Role	Director	Notes	Ref.
1987	Women on the Verge of a Nervous Breakdown		Pedro Almodóvar		
1989	Tie Me Up! Tie Me Down!		Pedro Almodóvar		
1993	The Bilingual Lover		Vicente Aranda		
1996	Libertarias		Vicente Aranda		
1997	Amor de hombre				
1998	The Girl of Your Dreams		Fernando Trueba		
1999	Esa Maldita Costilla		Juan José Jusid		
2003	Obra maestra		David Trueba		
2003	Descongélate				
2003	El Cid: The Legend			Voice	
2004	Implicación		Julián Quintanilla		
2005	Desde que amanece apetece		Antonio del Real		
2006	Manuela		Marco Castro		
2020	Dos Corazones	Berta	Francisco Lupini		
2022	Padre no hay más que uno 3	Milagros			
2023	Alimañas	Nieves			

=== Television ===
Date	Title	Role	Network	Notes
2003–2004	Aquí no hay quien viva	Paloma	Antena 3	30 episodes
2006	Fuera de control	Mariví	Televisión Española	13 episodes
2006	Manolo y Benito Corporeision	Milagros García	Antena 3	10 episodes
2013-2014	Águila Roja	Sagrario de Castro	Televisión Española	14 episodes
2015	Benidorm	Dolores	ITV	1 episode
2016-present	La que se avecina	Menchu	Telecinco	

== Awards and nominations ==
Year	Award	Category	Work	Result
1990	Goya Award	Best Supporting Actress	Tie Me Up! Tie Me Down!	Nominated
1996	Goya Award	Best Supporting Actress	Libertarias	Nominated
1998	Goya Award	Best Supporting Actress	The Girl of Your Dreams	Nominated
2003	Unión de Actores y Actrices	Best Television Main Actress	Aquí no hay quien viva	Nominated
2003	Fotogramas de Plata	Best Television Actress	Aquí no hay quien viva	Won
2004	Festival de Cine de Girona	Best Actress	Implicación	Won
