= Atresmedia Cine =

Film studio established in 2000

Atresmedia Cine, S.L.
- Formerly: Ensueño Films (2000–2008); Antena 3 Films (2008–2013)
- Industry: Film industry
- Founded: November 2000
- Headquarters: Calle Isla Graciosa, 13, San Sebastián de los Reyes, Spain
- Key people: Jaime Ortiz de Artiñano (Director-General)
- Products: Motion pictures
- Owner: Atresmedia
- Parent: Atresmedia Studios

Atresmedia Cine (formerly Ensueño Films and Antena 3 Films) is the studio belonging to Grupo Atresmedia responsible for producing films. It was created in 2000.

== History ==
The film production company was created after the enacting of the Spanish Law 22/1999, June 7, regulating the collaboration between the television operators and the film industry. The studio of the Grupo Antena 3 (later Atresmedia) was created in November 2000 under the brand identity 'Ensueño Films'. It was later rebranded as 'Antena 3 Films', and then as 'Atresmedia Cine'. In light of the ensuing forced investment of the television operators in film production, Atresmedia (through its own studio) as well as rival operator Mediaset España (through its respective producing arm Telecinco Cinema) eventually became the two main film producers in the country. In 2019, Atresmedia Cine was integrated within Atresmedia Studios, the division created in 2017 to produce fiction for third-party platforms, and which was in turn integrated in 2020 into a newly created joint-venture of Atresmedia with Telefónica, Buendía Estudios. In 2022, Jaime Ortiz de Artiñano was appointed as the new Director-General of Atresmedia Cine, replacing Mercedes Gamero, who quit the position after 18 years working for Atresmedia to join Beta Fiction Spain.
