= List of Spanish films of 2023 =

A list of Spanish-produced and co-produced feature films released in Spain in 2023. When applicable, the domestic theatrical release date is favoured.

== Films ==
Release		Title (Domestic title)	Cast & Crew	Distribution label	Ref.
J A N U A R Y	13	Piety (La piedad)	Director: Eduardo Casanova Cast: Ángela Molina, Manel Llunell, Ana Polvorosa, María León, Antonio Durán, Macarena Gómez	Barton Films	(Note: Co-production Spain–Argentina (80%–20%).)
J A N U A R Y	13	The Substitute (El suplente)	Director: Diego Lerman Cast: Juan Minujín, Alfredo Castro, Bárbara Lennie	A Contracorriente Films	(Note: Co-production Spain–Argentina–Italy–Mexico (10%–45.5%–24.5%–20%).)
J A N U A R Y	20	The Burning Cold (El fred que crema)	Director: Santi Trullenque Cast: Greta Fernández, Roger Casamajor, Pedro Casablanc	Filmax	
J A N U A R Y	27	Lobo feroz	Director: Gustavo Hernández Cast: Adriana Ugarte, Javier Gutiérrez, Rubén Ochandiano, Juana Acosta	Filmax	
F E B R U A R Y	3	Infiesto	Director: Patxi Amezcua Cast: Isak Férriz, Iria del Río	Netflix	
F E B R U A R Y	3	La amiga de mi amiga	Director: Zaida Carmona Cast: Zaida Carmona, Rocío Saiz	Begin Again Films	
F E B R U A R Y	3	Walls Can Talk (Las paredes hablan)	Director: Carlos Saura	Wanda Visión	
F E B R U A R Y	10	The Communion Girl (La niña de la comunión)	Director: Víctor Garcia Cast: Carla Campra, Aina Quiñones, Marc Soler, Carlos Oviedo	Warner Bros. Pictures	
F E B R U A R Y	17	My Father's Mexican Wedding (La novia de América)	Director: Alfonso Albacete Cast: Miren Ibarguren, Pol Monen, Eduardo Casanova, Ginés García Millán, Pepa Charro	A Contracorriente Films	
F E B R U A R Y	17	Venus	Director: Víctor Conde Cast: Antonio Hortelano, Paula Muñoz, Ariana Bruguera, Carlos Serrano-Clark, Carlos Gorbe, Juan Diego, Elena Furiase, Lolita Flores, Ana Rujas, Miquel Fernández	Begin Again Films	
F E B R U A R Y	24	Irati	Director: Paul Urkijo Cast: Eneko Sagardoy, Edurne Azkarate, Itziar Ituño	Filmax	
F E B R U A R Y	24	Mummies (Momias)	Director: Juan Jesús García Galocha	Warner Bros. Pictures	
M A R C H	2	Eterna	Director: Juanma Sayalonga, David Sainz	39 Escalones	
M A R C H	3	Love at First Kiss (Eres tú)	Director: Alauda Ruiz de Azúa Cast: Álvaro Cervantes, Silvia Alonso, Susana Abaitua, Gorka Otxoa	Netflix	
M A R C H	10	Co-Husbands (Mari(dos))	Director: Lucía Alemany Cast: Paco León, Ernesto Alterio, Celia Freijeiro, Raúl Cimas	Buena Vista International	
M A R C H	17	Under Therapy (Bajo terapia)	Director: Gerardo Herrero Cast: Malena Alterio, Fele Martínez, Alexandra Jiménez, Antonio Pagudo, Eva Ugarte, Juan Carlos Vellido	Syldavia Cinema	
M A R C H	17	The Elderly (Viejos)	Director: Raúl Cerezo, Fernando González Gómez Cast: Zorion Eguileor, Gustavo Salmerón, Paula Gallego, Irene Anula	—N/a	
M A R C H	24	Matria	Director: Álvaro Gago Cast: María Vázquez, Soraya Luaces, Santi Prego, Susana Sampedro, Francisca Iglesias	Avalon	
M A R C H	24	El hotel de los líos. García y García 2	Director: Ana Murugarren Cast: José Mota, Paz Padilla, Diego Arroba El Cejas, Pepe Viyuela	Buena Vista International	
M A R C H	31	Tin&Tina	Director: Rubin Stein Cast: Jaime Lorente, Milena Smit, Carlos González Morollón	Filmax	
M A R C H	31	Stormy Lola (Loli Tormenta)	Director: Agustí Villaronga Cast: Susi Sánchez, Joel Gálvez, Mor Ngom, Maria Anglada Sellarés, Celso Bugallo, Fernando Esteso, Pepa Charro	Caramel Films	
A P R I L	5	Let the Dance Begin (Empieza el baile)	Director: Marina Seresesky Cast: Darío Grandinetti, Mercedes Morán, Jorge Marrale	Me Lo Creo	(Note: Co-production Spain–Argentina (40%–60%).)
A P R I L	14	Phenomena (Fenómenas)	Director: Carlos Therón Cast: Belén Rueda, Gracia Olayo, Toni Acosta, Emilio Gutiérrez Caba	Netflix	
A P R I L	21	One Hell of a Holiday! (¡Vaya vacaciones!)	Director: Víctor García León Cast: Toni Acosta, Ernesto Sevilla, Tito Valverde, Gracia Olayo	Universal Pictures	
A P R I L	21	20,000 Species of Bees (20.000 especies de abejas)	Director: Estibaliz Urresola Solaguren Cast: Sofía Otero, Patricia López Arnaiz, Ane Gabarain, Itziar Lazkano, Martxelo Rubio, Sara Cózar, Miguel Garcés, Unax Hayden, Andere Garabieta	BTeam Pictures	
A P R I L	28	Someone Who Takes Care of Me (Alguien que cuide de mí)	Director: Daniela Fejerman, Elvira Lindo Cast: Aura Garrido, Emma Suárez, Magüi Mira	A Contracorriente Films	
A P R I L	28	Good Manners (Los buenos modales)	Director: Marta Díaz de Lope Díaz Cast: Gloria Muñoz, Elena Irureta, Carmen Flores, Pepa Aniorte, Inma Cuesta	Warner Bros. Pictures	
A P R I L	28	Fatum	Director: Juan Galiñanes Cast: Luis Tosar, Elena Anaya, Arón Piper, Luisa Mayol, Pepa Gracia	Universal Pictures	
M A Y	5	Siege (Asedio)	Director: Miguel Ángel Vivas Cast: Natalia de Molina, Bella Agossou, Francisco Reyes	Sony Pictures	
M A Y	5	In the Company of Women (Las buenas compañías)	Director: Sílvia Munt Cast: Alícia Falcó, Itziar Ituño, Elena Tarrats, Ainhoa Santamaría	Filmax	
M A Y	12	Stillness in the Storm (Gelditasuna ekaitzean)	Director: Alberto Gastesi Cast: Loreto Mauleón, Iñigo Gastesi, Aitor Beltrán, Vera Milán	Vidania Films	
J U N E	2	Everyone Will Burn (Y todos arderán)	Director: David Hebrero Cast: Macarena Gómez, Ana Milán, Rodolfo Sancho, Rubén Ochandiano, Ella Kweku, Sofía García, Fernando Cayo, Saturnino García	Filmin	
J U N E	2	How to Become a Modern Man (Como Dios manda)	Director: Paz Jiménez Cast: Leo Harlem, María Morales, Daniel Pérez Prada	Warner Bros. Pictures	
J U N E	2	Tobacco Barns (Secaderos)	Director: Rocío Mesa Cast: Vera Centenera, Ada Mar Lupiañez, Tamara Arias	Begin Again Films	
J U N E	2	The Enchanted (Els encantats)	Director: Elena Trapé Cast: Laia Costa, Pep Cruz, Aina Clotet, Dani Pérez Prada, Ainara Elejalde	A Contracorriente Films	
J U N E	8	My Fault (Culpa mía)	Director: Domingo González Cast: Nicole Wallace, Gabriel Guevara, Marta Hazas	Prime Video	
J U N E	9	Girl Unknown (La desconocida)	Director: Pablo Maqueda Cast: Laia Manzanares, Manolo Solo, Eva Llorach	Filmax	
J U N E	16	The Fantastic Golem Affairs (El fantástico caso del golem)	Director: Burnin' Percebes Cast: Brays Efe, Bruna Cusí, Javier Botet, Anna Castillo, Luis Tosar	Sideral Cinema	
J U N E	16	Upon Entry (Upon Entry (La llegada))	Director: Alejandro Rojas, Juan Sebastián Vásquez Cast: Alberto Ammann, Bruna Cusí, Ben Temple, Laura Gómez	Karma Films	
J U N E	16	Kepler 6B (Kepler Sexto B)	Director: Alejandro Suárez Lozano Cast: Karra Elejalde, Daniela Pezzotti, Jorge Bosch	Filmax	
J U N E	23	Through My Window: Across the Sea (A través del mar)	Director: Marçal Forés Cast: Clara Galle, Julio Peña, Guillermo Lasheras, Natalia Azahara, Hugo Arbués, Eric Masip, Emilia Lazo, Andrea Chaparro, Iván Lapadula, Carla Tous	Netflix	
J U N E	23	Not Such an Easy Life (Una vida no tan simple)	Director: Félix Viscarret Cast: Miki Esparbé, Álex García, Olaya Caldera, Ana Polvorosa	A Contracorriente Films	
J U N E	23	The Fortress (La fortaleza)	Director: Chiqui Carabante Cast: Fernando Cayo, Goya Toledo, José Manuel Poga, Fernando Tejero, Vito Sanz, Carla Nieto, Lola Casamayor, Manuel Zarzo	Syldavia Cinema	
J U N E	29	Olvido	Director: Inés París Cast: Maria Caballero, Morgan Blasco, Javier Butler, Carlos Olalla	—N/a	
J U N E	30	Unicorns (Unicornios)	Director: Àlex Lora Cast: Greta Fernández, Elena Martín, Nora Navas	Filmax	
J U N E	30	Last Wishes (Últimas voluntades)	Director: Joaquín Carmona Cast: Fernando Tejero, Óscar Casas, Nerea Camacho, Carlos Santos	Alfa Pictures	
J U N E	30	The Antares Paradox (La paradoja de Antares)	Director: Luis Tinoco Cast: Andrea Trepat, Aleida Torrent, Jaume de Sans	#ConUnPack	
J U L Y	6	Summer Vacation (Vacaciones de verano)	Director: Santiago Segura Cast: Santiago Segura, Leo Harlem, Patricia Conde, Cristina Gallego	Sony Pictures	
J U L Y	6	Love & Revolution (Te estoy amando locamente)	Director: Alejandro Marín Cast: Omar Banana, Ana Wagener, Alba Flores	Filmax	
J U L Y	14	Bird Box Barcelona	Director: David Pastor, Àlex Pastor Cast: Mario Casas, Alejandra Howard, Georgina Campbell, Diego Calva, Naila Schuberth, Lola Dueñas, Patrick Criado, Gonzalo de Castro, Michelle Jenner, Leonardo Sbaraglia	Netflix	
J U L Y	14	Esperando a Dalí	Director: David Pujol Cast: José García, Ivan Massagué, Clara Ponsot, Nicolas Cazalé, Pol López, Paco Tous, Vicky Peña	Alfa Pictures	
J U L Y	28	Delfines de plata	Director: Javier Elorrieta Cast: Rodolfo Sancho, Will Shephard, María Blanco, Luis Fernando Alvés	Filmax	
A U G U S T	4	De perdidos a Río	Director: Joaquín Mazón Cast: Fran Perea, Pablo Chiapella, Carlos Santos, Esther Acebo, Jorge Cremades	Sony Pictures	
A U G U S T	11	The Boogeyman: The Origin of the Myth (El hombre del saco)	Director: Ángel Gómez Hernández Cast: Javier Botet, Macarena Gómez, Manolo Solo, Claudia Placer, Carla Tous, Guillermo Novillo	Filmax	
A U G U S T	18	Championext (Campeonex)	Director: Javier Fesser Cast: Sergio Olmos, Jesús Lago, José de Luna, Jesús Vidal, Fran Fuentes, Gloria Ramos, Alberto Nieto, Roberto Chinchilla, Stefan López	Universal Pictures	
A U G U S T	25	Caged Wings (Mi soledad tiene alas)	Director: Mario Casas Cast: Óscar Casas, Candela González, Farid Bechara	Warner Bros. Pictures	
A U G U S T	25	The Girls Are Alright (Las chicas están bien)	Director: Itsaso Arana Cast: Bárbara Lennie, Irene Escolar, Itziar Manero, Helena Ezquerro, Itsaso Arana	Elastica	
A U G U S T	25	Killer Book Club (El club de los lectores criminales)	Director: Carlos Alonso Cast: Veki Velilla, Álvaro Mel, Iván Pellicer, Priscilla Delgado, Carlos Alcaide, María Cerezuela, Carmela Lloret, Hamza Zaidi, Daniel Grao	Netflix	
S E P T E M B E R	1	Jump! (¡Salta!)	Director: Olga Osorio Cast: Tamar Novas, Marta Nieto, Mario Santos, Rubén Fulgencio, Irene Jiménez, Mabel Rivera, Manuel Manquiña	A Contracorriente Films	
S E P T E M B E R	1	La manzana de oro	Director: Jaime Chávarri Cast: Marta Nieto, Sergi López, Adrián Lastra	A Contracorriente Films	
S E P T E M B E R	8	Summer in Red (Verano en rojo)	Director: Belén Macías Cast: Marta Nieto, José Coronado, Luis Callejo, Francesco Carril	DeAPlaneta	
S E P T E M B E R	8	Creatura	Director: Elena Martín Gimeno Cast: Elena Martín Gimeno, Oriol Pla, Alex Brendemühl, Clara Segura	Avalon	
S E P T E M B E R	15	The Cuckoo's Curse (El cuco)	Director: Mar Targarona Cast: Belén Cuesta, Jorge Suquet, Rainer Reiners, Hildegard Schroedter	Filmax	
S E P T E M B E R	15	All the Names of God (Todos los nombres de Dios)	Director: Daniel Calparsoro Cast: Luis Tosar, Inma Cuesta, Nourdin Batán, Roberto Enríquez, Antonio Buíl, Patricia Vico, Lucas Nabor, Joan Solé, Fernando Cayo	Tripictures	
S E P T E M B E R	22	Friends Till Death (Amigos hasta la muerte)	Director: Javier Veiga Cast: Javier Veiga, Marta Hazas, Mauricio Ochmann, Luna Gallego, Nacho Nugo, Óscar Allo, Xosé A. Touriñán, David Amor, Ledicia Sola, Xoel López, Fele Martínez, Mela Casal	A Contracorriente Films	
S E P T E M B E R	22	Speak Sunlight (La voz del sol)	Director: Carol Polakoff Cast: Karra Elejalde, Carmen Machi, Matteo Artunedo	Adso Films	
S E P T E M B E R	22	Truce(s) (Tregua(s))	Director: Mario Hernández Cast: Salva Reina, Bruna Cusí	Syldavia Cinema	
S E P T E M B E R	22	Desmadre incluido	Director: Miguel Martí Cast: Macarena Gómez, Nacho Guerreros, Pilar Ordóñez, Manuel Tallafé, Salva Reina	39 Escalones	
S E P T E M B E R	29	Close Your Eyes (Cerrar los ojos)	Director: Víctor Erice Cast: Manolo Solo, José Coronado, Ana Torrent, María León, Mario Pardo	Avalon	
S E P T E M B E R	29	Nowhere	Director: Albert Pintó Cast: Anna Castillo, Tamar Novas	Netflix	
S E P T E M B E R	29	The Tenderness (La ternura)	Director: Vicente Villanueva Cast: Emma Suárez, Gonzalo de Castro, Alexandra Jiménez, Fernando Guallar, Anna Moliner, Carlos Cuevas	Universal Pictures	(Note: Co-production Spain–Dominican Republic)
O C T O B E R	6	Chinas, a Second Generation Story (Chinas)	Director: Arantxa Echevarría Cast: Shiman Yang, Ella Qiu, Xinyi Ye, Leonor Watling, Pablo Molinero, Carolina Yuste	A Contracorriente Films	
O C T O B E R	6	They Shot the Piano Player (Dispararon al pianista)	Director: Fernando Trueba, Javier Mariscal	BTeam Pictures	
O C T O B E R	11	Me he hecho viral	Director: Jorge Coira Cast: Blanca Suárez, Enric Auquer, Nicolás Furtado, Miguel Rellán, Daniel Fez, Cristina Gallego, Esperanza Guardado	Warner Bros. Pictures	
O C T O B E R	11	Awareness	Director: Daniel Benmayor Cast: Carlos Scholz, María Pedraza, Pedro Alonso, Óscar Jaenada, Lela Loren	Prime Video	
O C T O B E R	11	The Rye Horn (O corno)	Director: Jaione Camborda Cast: Janet Novás, Carla Rivas	Elastica	
O C T O B E R	20	Mi otro Jon	Director: Paco Arango Cast: Carmen Maura, Fernando Albizu, Olivia Molina, Carlos Santos, Aitana Sánchez-Gijón	Wanda Visión	
O C T O B E R	20	Conversations on Hatred (Conversaciones sobre el odio)	Director: Vera Fogwill, Diego Martínez Cast: Cecilia Roth, Maricel Álvarez	Moon Entertainment	
O C T O B E R	26	This Excessive Ambition (Esta ambición desmedida)	Director: Santos Bacana, Cristina Trenas, and Rogelio González Cast: C. Tangana	Avalon	
O C T O B E R	27	Mamacruz	Director: Patricia Ortega Cast: Kiti Mánver	Filmax	
O C T O B E R	27	The Movie Teller (La contadora de películas)	Director: Lone Scherfig Cast: Bérénice Bejo, Antonio de la Torre, Daniel Brühl, Alondra Valenzuela	A Contracorriente Films	
O C T O B E R	27	Sister Death (Hermana Muerte)	Director: Paco Plaza Cast: Aria Bedmar, Almudena Amor, Maru Valdivielso, Luisa Merelas, Chelo Vivares	Netflix	
O C T O B E R	27	Alimañas	Director: Jordi Sánchez, Pep Anton Gómez Cast: Jordi Sánchez, Carlos Areces, Silvia Abril, Loles León, Carmina Barrios	Sony Pictures	
N O V E M B E R	1	Jokes & Cigarettes (Saben aquell)	Director: David Trueba Cast: David Verdaguer, Carolina Yuste, Pedro Casablanc, Marina Salas, Ramon Fontserè	Warner Bros. Pictures	
N O V E M B E R	10	Un amor	Director: Isabel Coixet Cast: Laia Costa, Hovik Keuchkerian, Hugo Silva, Luis Bermejo, Ingrid García-Jonsson, Francesco Carril	BTeam Pictures	
N O V E M B E R	10	The Teacher Who Promised the Sea (El maestro que prometió el mar)	Director: Patricia Font Cast: Enric Auquer, Laia Costa, Ramón Agirre, Luisa Gavasa, Milo Taboada	Filmax	
N O V E M B E R	10	Just One Small Favor (El favor)	Director: Juana Macías Cast: Inma Cuesta, Diego Martín, Sara Sálamo, Alfonso Bassave, Pere Ponce, Gonzalo de Castro, Isabel Ordaz, Luisa Gavasa, Betsy Túrnez	Universal Pictures	
N O V E M B E R	10	La Singla	Director: Paloma Zapata Cast: Helena Kaittani, Antonia Singla	Atera Films	
N O V E M B E R	17	The Chapel (La ermita)	Director: Carlota Pereda Cast: Belén Rueda, Maia Zaitegi, Josean Bengoetxea, Loreto Mauleón, Elena Irureta	Filmax	
N O V E M B E R	17	Something Is About to Happen (Que nadie duerma)	Director: Antonio Méndez Esparza Cast: Malena Alterio, Aitana Sánchez-Gijón, José Luis Torrijo	Wanda Visión	
N O V E M B E R	17	The Permanent Picture (La imatge permanent)	Director: Laura Ferrés Cast: María Luengo, Rosario Ortega, Saraida Llamas	La Aventura	
N O V E M B E R	17	Amanece	Director: Juan Francisco Viruega Cast: Aura Garrido, Iria del Río, Isabel Ampudia	Syldavia Cinema	
N O V E M B E R	17	Sultana's Dream (El sueño de la Sultana)	Director: Isabel Herguera	Filmin	
N O V E M B E R	24	Teresa	Director: Paula Ortiz Cast: Blanca Portillo, Asier Etxeandia, Greta Fernández, Consuelo Trujillo, Ainet Jounou	BTeam Pictures	
N O V E M B E R	24	Andrea's Love (El amor de Andrea)	Director: Manuel Martín Cuenca Cast: Lupe Mateo Barredo, Inés Amueva, Jesús Ortiz, José M. Verdulla Otero, Fidel Sierra, Agustín Domínguez, Irka Lugo	Filmax	
N O V E M B E R	30	The Coffee Table (La mesita del comedor)	Director: Caye Casas Cast: Estefanía de los Santos, David Pareja, Claudia Riera, Itziar Castro, Emilio Gavira	—N/a	
D E C E M B E R	1	A Moroccan Affair (Ocho apellidos marroquís)	Director: Álvaro Fernández Armero Cast: Michelle Jenner, Julián López, Elena Irureta, María Ramos, Hamza Zaidi	Universal Pictures	
D E C E M B E R	1	Foremost by Night (Sobre todo de noche)	Director: Víctor Iriarte Cast: Lola Dueñas, Ana Torrent, Manuel Egozkue, María Vázquez	Atalante	
D E C E M B E R	1	One Night with Adela (Una noche con Adela)	Director: Hugo Ruiz Cast: Laura Galán, Litus, Jimmy Barnatán, Raudel Raúl, Gemma Nierga	#ConUnPack	
D E C E M B E R	1	The Night My Dad Saved Christmas (La Navidad en sus manos)	Director: Joaquín Mazón Cast: Ernesto Sevilla, Unax Hayden, Pablo Chiapella, Santiago Segura	A Contracorriente Films	
D E C E M B E R	1	Quest	Director: Antonina Obrador Cast: Enric Auquer, Laia Manzanares	—N/a	
D E C E M B E R	6	Robot Dreams	Director: Pablo Berger	BTeam Pictures	
D E C E M B E R	15	Society of the Snow (La sociedad de la nieve)	Director: J.A. Bayona Cast: Enzo Vogrincic, Agustín Pardella, Matías Recalt, Esteban Bigliardi, Diego Vegezzi	Tripictures	
D E C E M B E R	15	The Wait (La espera)	Director: F. Javier Gutiérrez Cast: Víctor Clavijo, Ruth Díaz, Luis Callejo, Pedro Casablanc, Manuel Morón	Maravillas Distribuciones	
D E C E M B E R	15	The Last Night of Sandra M. (La última noche de Sandra M.)	Director: Borja de la Vega Cast: Claudia Traisac, Georgina Amorós, Nicolás Illoro	Flamingo Films	
D E C E M B E R	20	Cuánto me queda	Director: Carolina Bassecourt Cast: Salva Reina, Kira Miró, Antonio Pagudo, Eva Ugarte	A Contracorriente Films	
D E C E M B E R	20	Samsara	Director: Lois Patiño	Atalante	

== Box office ==
The ten highest-grossing Spanish films in 2023, by in-year domestic box office gross revenue, were as follows:

Highest-grossing films of 2023
Rank	Title	Distributor	Admissions	Domestic gross (€)
1	Championext (Campeonex)	Universal Pictures	1,975,785	11,888,158
2	A Moroccan Affair (Ocho apellidos marroquís)	Universal Pictures	1,293,773	8,883,294
3	Summer Vacation (Vacaciones de verano)	Sony Pictures	1,245,648	7,417,977
4	Mummies (Momias)	Warner Bros. Pictures	960,628	5,915,965
5	One Hell of a Holiday! (¡Vaya vacaciones!)	Universal Pictures	803,351	4,803,875
6	Co-Husbands (Mari(dos))	Buena Vista International	622,263	4,067,858
7	The Night My Dad Saved Christmas (La Navidad en sus manos)	A Contracorriente Films	528,061	3,383,758
8	The Beasts (As bestas) ‡	A Contracorriente Films	511,766	3,276,371
9	El hotel de los líos. García y García 2	Buena Vista International	363,814	2,229,338
10	How to Become a Modern Man (Como Dios manda)	Warner Bros. Pictures	332,054	2,133,099
‡: 2022 theatrical opening

== See also ==
- 38th Goya Awards
- List of 2023 box office number-one films in Spain
