= List of Beninese actors =

This is a list of actors and actresses from, or connected to, the Republic of Benin. This list is arranged alphabetically by surname.

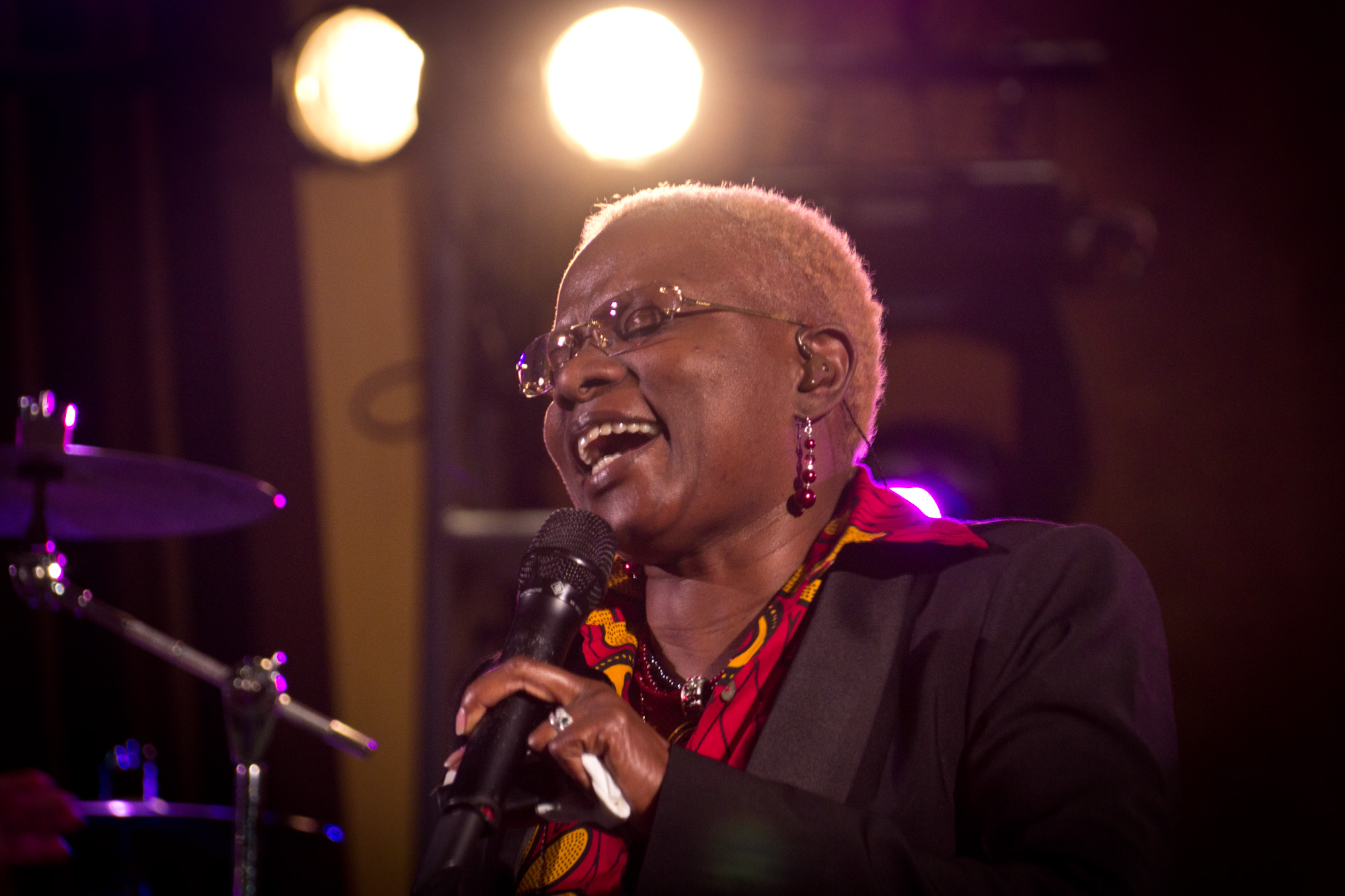
Angélique Kidjo at the United Nations in 2012

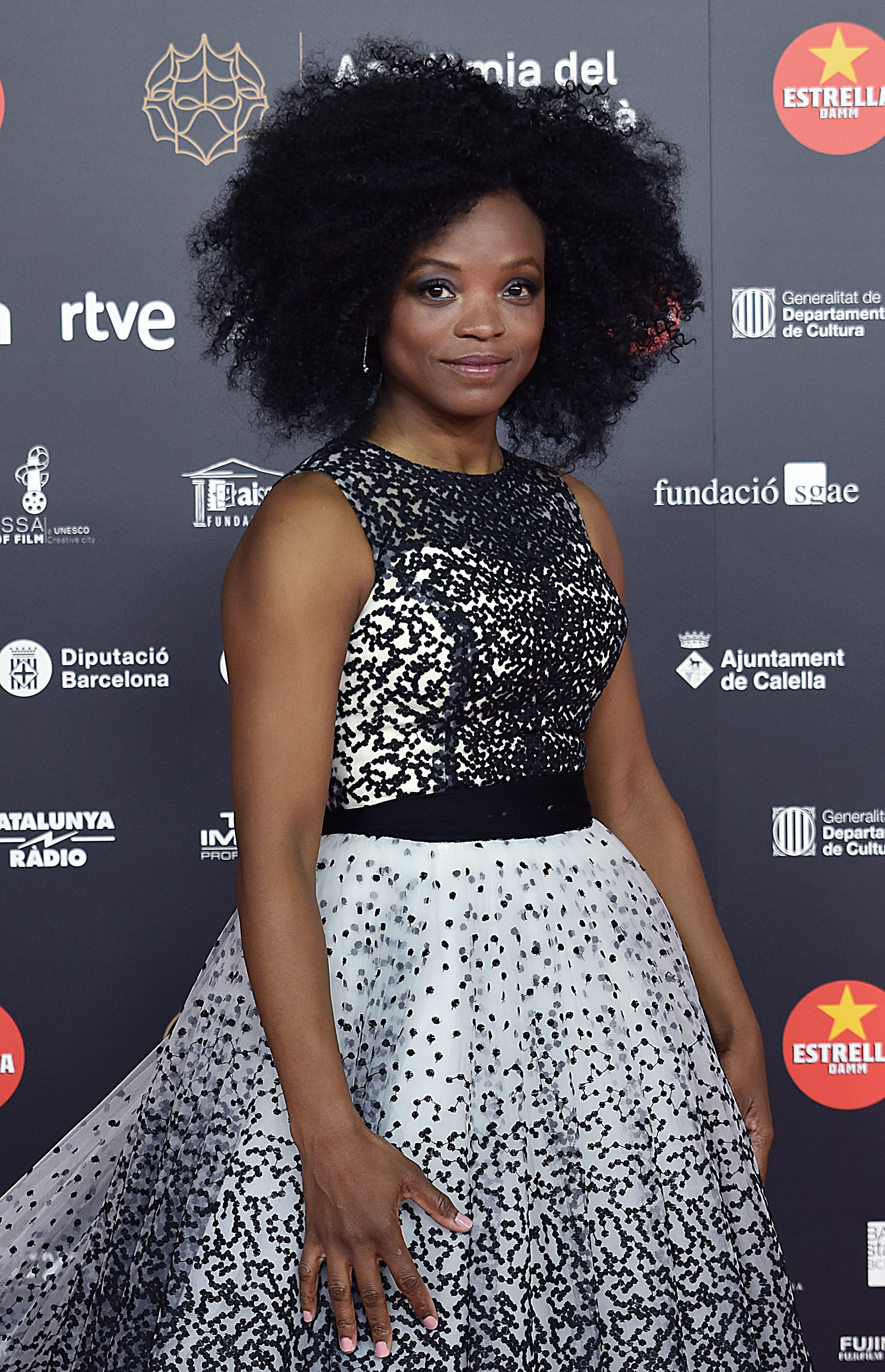
Bella Agossou, 2021

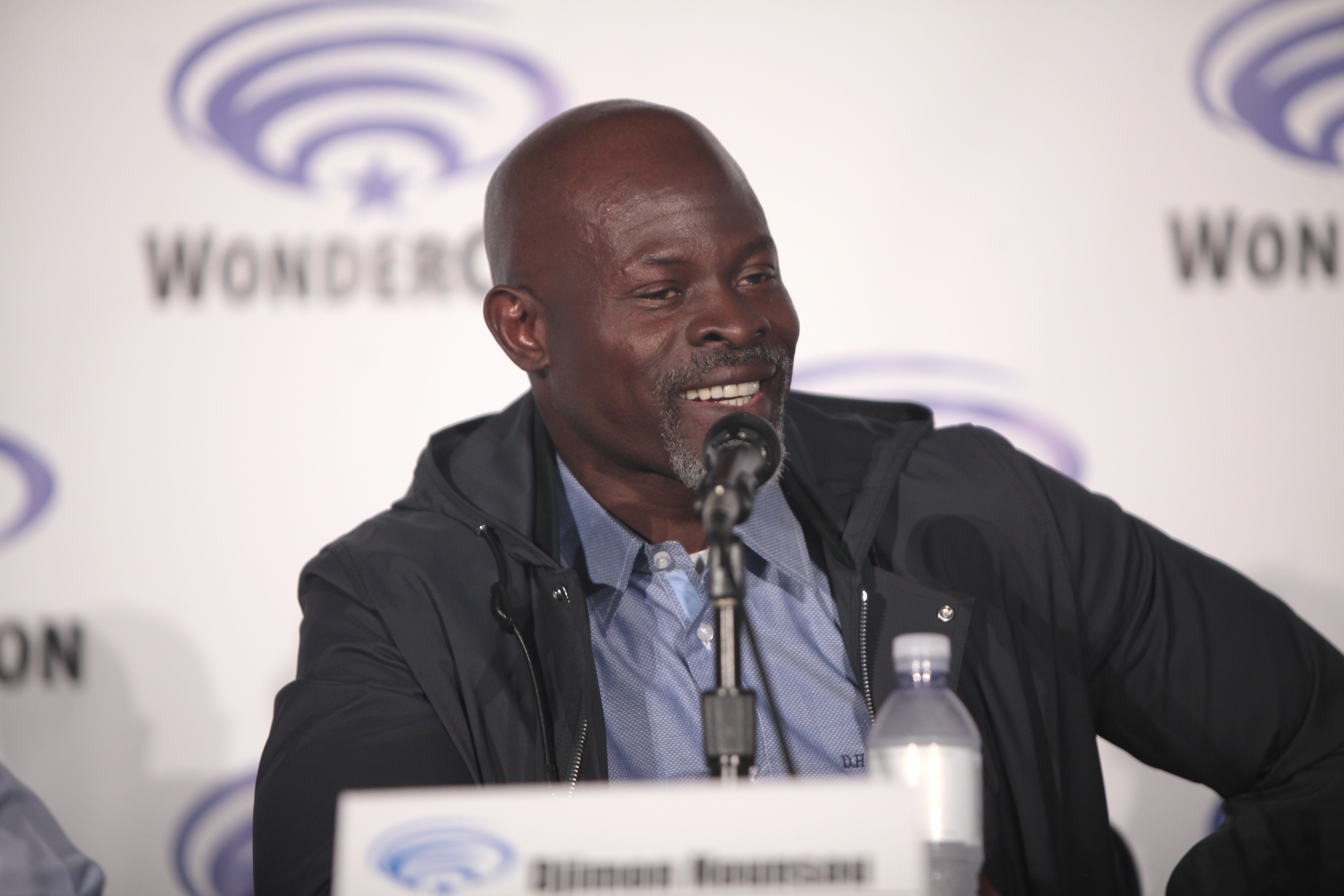
Djimon Hounsou, at WonderCon in 2016

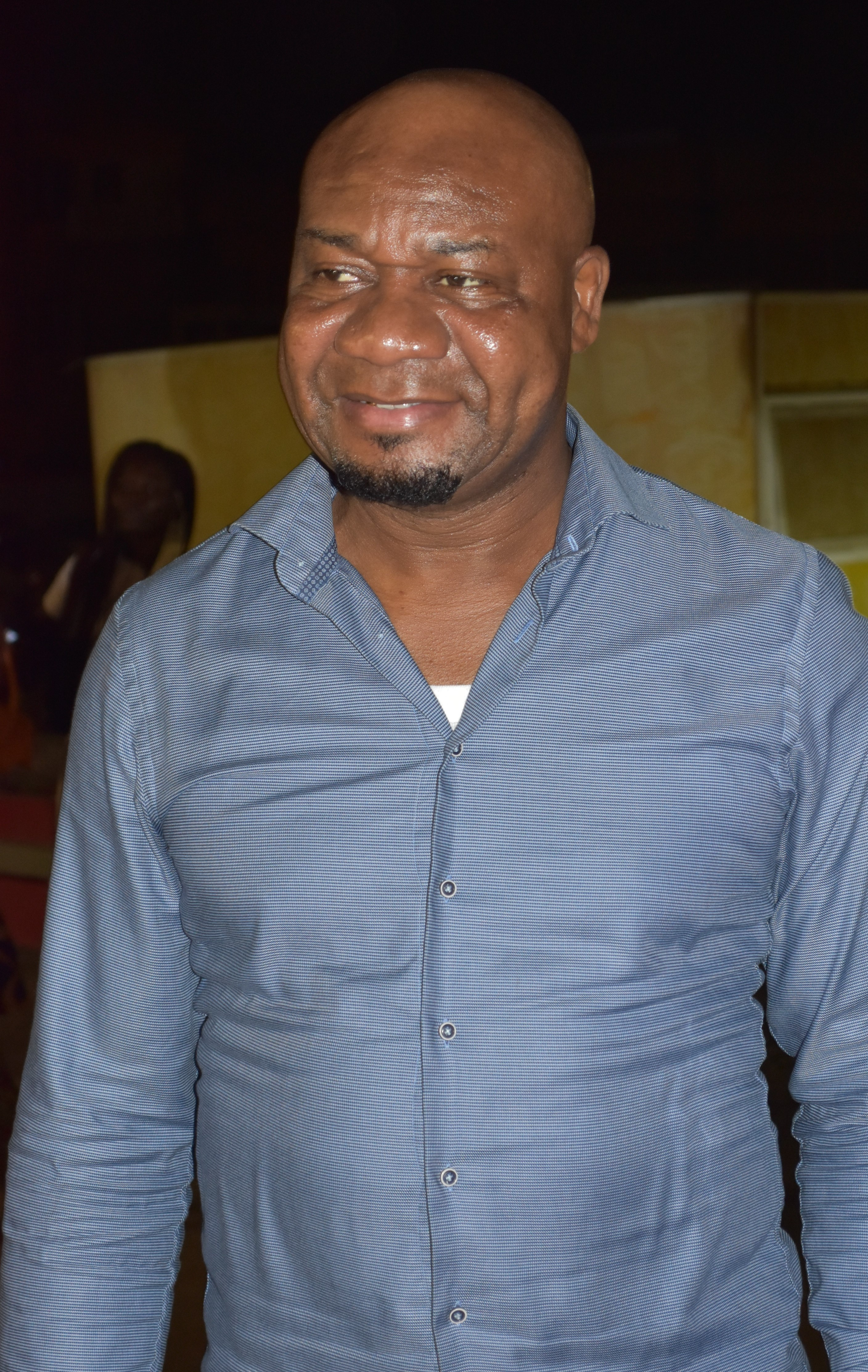
Pierre "Eléphant Mouillé" Zinko in 2022

== Actors ==
- Marcelline Aboh (1940–2017)
- Elvire Adjamonsi born 18 February 1971 (age 54)
- Bella Agossou born 1981 (age 43–44)
- Djimon Hounsou
- Angélique Kidjo born 14 July 1960 (age 65)
- Eléphant Mouillé born 1969 (age 55–56)
- Jean Odoutan born 1965 (age 59–60)
- José Pliva (1966–2025)
- Pipi Wobaho (fl. 1987–present)
- Baba Yabo (1925–1985)
- Kenneth Yannick born 30 October 1995 (age 30)

== See also ==
- List of Beninese people
- Cinema of Benin
