= Siege (2023 film) =

- Film poster
- Spanish: Asedio
- Directed by: Miguel Ángel Vivas
- Written by: Marta Medina
- Based on: an original story by Miguel Ángel Vivas and José Rodríguez
- Produced by: Enrique López Lavigne
- Starring: Natalia de Molina; Bella Agossou
- Cinematography: Rafael Reparaz
- Edited by: Luis de la Madrid
- Music by: Sergio Acosta Russek
- Distributed by: Sony Pictures Entertainment Iberia
- Release dates: March 2023 (Málaga); 5 May 2023 (Spain); 21 September 2023 (Mexico)
- Countries: Spain; Mexico
- Language: Spanish
- Box office: €0.13 million (Spain)

Siege (Spanish: Asedio) is a 2023 Spanish-Mexican thriller film directed by Miguel Ángel Vivas and written by Marta Medina which stars Natalia de Molina and Bella Agossou.

== Plot ==
In the wake of getting involved in a corruption case, riot police agent Dani switch sides during a home eviction in Madrid, teaming up with irregular immigrant and evictee Nasha as well as the latter's son Little.

== Cast ==
- Natalia de Molina as Dani
- Bella Agossou as Nasha
- Oscar Eribo as Little
- Francisco Reyes as Trajano
- Fran Cantos as Coria
- Chani Martín as Cervantes
- Jorge Kent as Rivero
- Efraín Rodríguez as Lolo
- Lucas Nabor
- Federico Pérez Rey
- Luis Hacha
- Fernando Valdivielso
- Karlos Aurrekoetxea
- Alejandro Casaseca

== Production ==
Based on an original story by Miguel Ángel Vivas and José Rodríguez, the film was written by Marta Medina. It was produced by Apache Films (Enrique López Lavigne) alongside México City Project, in association with Sony Pictures International Productions and the participation of RTVE and Amazon Prime Video. Filming lasted from October to November 2021. The film was shot in an apartment building in Parla, in the Madrid region.

== Release ==
Asedio was selected for screening in March 2023 in the 26th Málaga Film Festival's 'Malaga Premiere' lineup, the official selection's non-competitive slate. Distributed by Sony Pictures Entertainment Iberia, it was released theatrically in Spain on 5 May 2023. It received a theatrical release in Mexico on 21 September 2023.

== Reception ==
On the review aggregator website Rotten Tomatoes, 100% of 5 critics' reviews are positive, with an average rating of 6.5/10.

Eduardo Parra of La Opinión de Málaga deemed Asedio to be one of the best films of the year, "social, human, police, and pure action [cinema] and one of those movies that stay in your head and you cannot get them out".

== See also ==
- List of Spanish films of 2023
- List of Mexican films of 2023
