= Olvido (film) =

- Theatrical release poster
- Directed by: Inés París
- Screenplay by: Fermín Palacios Pina
- Produced by: José Luis Rancaño; Mamen Espinosa
- Starring: María Caballero; Morgan Blasco; Javier Butler; Carlos Olalla
- Cinematography: Javier Alomar Garau
- Edited by: José Manuel Jiménez
- Music by: Isabel Royán
- Release dates: 24 June 2023 (CinemaJove); 29 June 2023 (Spain)
- Country: Spain
- Language: Spanish

Olvido is a 2023 Spanish mystery thriller film directed by Inés París and written by Fermín Palacios. Set against the backdrop of the 1957 Valencia flood, it stars Maria Caballero alongside Morgan Blasco.

== Plot ==
Set in the aftermath of the 1957 Valencia flood, the plot follows young investigative journalist Olvido Granell as she teams up with Policía Armada agent Joaquín Caplliure to unravel a conspiration connected to the emergence of marked dead bodies.

== Cast ==
- María Caballero as Olvido Granell
- Morgan Blasco as Joaquín Caplliure
- Javier Butler as Arnal
- Carlos Olalla as don Luis
- Magüi Mira
- Jorge Cabrera as doctor Rosat
- Ramón Ródenas as Perelló
- Álvaro Báguena as teniente Cervera

== Production ==
The film is a La Dalia Films production with backing from IVC, À Punt, SEPI, FGV and the Government of Navarre. Shooting locations included Valencia, Sagunt, Manises, Burjassot, Sueca, and Quart de Poblet.

== Release ==
The film premiered at the Cinema Jove-Valencia International Film Festival on 24 June 2023. It received a limited theatrical release on 29 June 2023, before expanding to cinemas in Madrid on 16 July 2023.

== Accolades ==
Year	Award	Category	Nominee(s)	Result	Ref.
2023	6th Berlanga Awards	Best Film		Nominated	
2023	6th Berlanga Awards	Best Director	Inés París	Nominated	
2023	6th Berlanga Awards	Best Screenplay	Fermín Palacios Pina	Nominated	
2023	6th Berlanga Awards	Best Editing and Post-Production	José Manuel Jiménez, Víctor Suñer e Iván Martín	Won	
2023	6th Berlanga Awards	Best Cinematography and Lighting	Javier Alomar Garau	Nominated	
2023	6th Berlanga Awards	Best Actress	Maria Caballero	Won	
2023	6th Berlanga Awards	Best Actor	Morgan Blasco	Nominated	
2023	6th Berlanga Awards	Best Production Supervision	Mamen Tortosa	Won	
2023	6th Berlanga Awards	Best Art Direction	Rafael Jannone	Nominated	
2023	6th Berlanga Awards	Best Costume Design	Inés Liverato	Won	
2023	6th Berlanga Awards	Best Makeup and Hairstyles	Esther Guillem, Piluca Guillem, David Ambit, Alba Bautista	Won	
2023	6th Berlanga Awards	Best Original Score	Isabel Royán	Nominated	

== See also ==
- List of Spanish films of 2023
