= One Night with Adela =

2023 film by Hugo Ruíz

- Film poster
- Spanish: Una noche con Adela
- Directed by: Hugo Ruíz
- Starring: Laura Galán; Gemma Nierga; Jimmy Barnatán; Raudel Raúl; Litus; Rosalía Omil; Fernando Moraleda; Beatriz Morandeira; Paco Martínez
- Cinematography: Diego Trenas
- Production companies: Muertos de Envidia; FTFCam
- Distributed by: #Conunpack
- Release dates: 8 June 2023 (Tribeca); 1 December 2023 (Spain)
- Country: Spain
- Language: Spanish

One Night with Adela (Spanish: Una noche con Adela) is a 2023 Spanish one-shot revenge thriller film directed by Hugo Ruíz which stars Laura Galán.

== Plot ==
The plot takes place in an unphotogenic Madrid. After ending her night shift, sad and deranged street sweeper Adela carries out a meticulous plan to exert brutal revenge on those who have wronged her and turned her into human garbage.

== Cast ==
- Laura Galán as Adela
- Jimmy Barnatán as Javi
- Litus as Bolo
- Raudel Raúl as Rafael
- Rosalía Omil as Adela's mother
- Fernando Moraleda as Adela's father
- Beatriz Morandeira as Lidy
- Gemma Nierga
- Paco Martínez

== Production ==
The film is a Muertos de Envidia Company and FTFCam production, in association with #Conunpack and with backing from Ayuntamiento de Madrid. It was shot in Madrid. Filming took place over just three days. In an interview with Variety, Ruíz explained that he limited the number of low-angle shots in the film so that "when they appear, you feel them, and that loads them with meaning and emotion".

Ruíz cited Sebastian Schipper's 2015 thriller "Victoria" as an inspiration for the film.

== Release ==
The film landed its world premiere in the 'Midnight' slate of the Tribeca Festival on 8 June 2023. It also screened on 21 October 2023 at the Albacete-based Abycine Film Festival for its Spanish premiere. Distributed by #Conunpack, it opened in Spanish theatres on 1 December 2023.

== Reception ==
Alfonso Rivera of Cineuropa wrote that the "unexpected turn" in the film's second part constitutes a "proper right hook" "to the most sacred of things, which will please the viewer in search of new (and powerful) emotions in these times steeped in sickly sweetness, insipidness, our addiction to 'likes' and political correctness".

== Accolades ==
Year	Award	Category	Nominee(s)	Result	Ref.
2024	38th Goya Awards	Best Cinematography	Diego Trenas	Nominated	

== See also ==
- List of Spanish films of 2023
