= Cristina Lasvignes =

Spanish (born 1978)

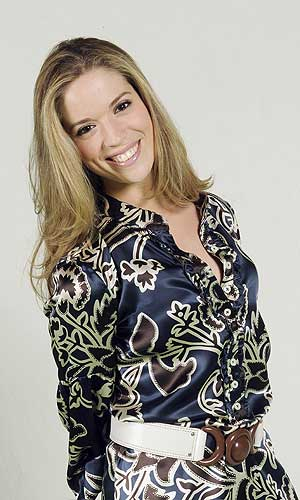
- Publicity photograph of Lasvignes
- Born: Cristina Lasvignes Martín; 9 January 1978; Madrid, Spain
- Education: Complutense University of Madrid
- Occupations: Businessperson; Journalist; Radio broadcaster Television presenter
- Spouse: José Manuel García (m. 2009)
- Children: 2

Cristina Lasvignes Martín (born 9 January 1978) is a Spanish television presenter, radio broadcaster, journalist and businessperson. A journalism graduate of the Complutense University of Madrid, she began her broadcasting career in local television before directing the Cadena SER radio show To Talk For The Sake Of Talking that she would go on to present from September 2006 to March 2009. Lasvignes presented the weekday afternoon current affairs and entertainment magazine Tal cual lo contamos on Antena 3 from October 2008 to June 2010. She was a co-host of the Kiss FM breakfast programme Las Mañanas Kiss from 2011 to 2014 and the entertainment magazine programme Esto es vida on RTVE's La 1 between 2015 and 2016.

== Biography ==
Lasvignes was born in Madrid on 9 January 1978. Her family name is of French origin, but her family have been residing in Spain for several decades. Lasvignes wanted to be a veterinarian when she was growing up but opted for a job working in communication. She is a graduate of the Complutense University of Madrid, having studied journalism.

She began her broadcasting career presenting the local television programme about the world of advertising ¡Qué idea! on Localia Televisión and was later reporting for the programme Un equipo on Cuatro in 2005. Lasvignes was also a reporting collaborator on the Cuatro evening magazine show Visto y oído during the summer season of 2008. She was the director of the Cadena SER radio show To Talk For The Sake Of Talking for four years before going on to present the programme from September 2006 to March 2009. Lasvignes was replaced by Macarena Berlín.

In September 2008, she was placed on a shortlist to become the presenter of the weekday afternoon current affairs and entertainment magazine Tal cual lo contamos on Antena 3 after Carme Chaparro and Planeta Group failed to reach an agreement. Lasvignes began her stint on the programme on 13 October 2008. In 2009, she presented the Spanish version of the Argentine programme Cuestión de peso on weekday afternoons on Antena 3, in which obese individuals attempt to lose weight. She did not present Tal cual verano during July and August 2009 and was replaced by Mónica Martínez and Juan Luis Alonso. Lasvignes stopped presenting the programme on 11 June 2010 when it was cancelled after 412 episodes.

Lasvignes began presenting the Kiss FM breakfast programme Las Mañanas Kiss featuring music and news with Alfredo Arense and Marta Ferrer on 3 October 2011. She was dismissed from Kiss FM in July 2014 due to lower than expected listening figures, and her final programme was on 11 July. Lasvigned switched on the Christmas lights in the San Antón market for the intellectual disability advocacy organisation Grupo AMÁS on 30 November 2012. She began presenting the La 1 (part of the RTVE network) entertainment magazine programme Esto es vida (which is focused on health) in October 2015. Lasvignes began the 28 October 2015 edition breastfeeding her baby with other women doing the same "to contribute to normalizing and visualizing the act of breastfeeding in public and to stop being a taboo in many countries, such as Spain" according to El Mundo. Following poor television ratings, she made her final appearance on the programme on 1 February 2016.

Lasvignes manages several companies related to the world of journalism and communication. She is a majority shareholder and co-founder of a company specialising in gastronomy, and which runs some entertainment and nightlife venues in Madrid. Lasvignes and her husband are involved in the Titán project, an advanced therapy unit to treat cancer in children at Hospital Universitario La Paz in Madrid.

== Personal life ==
She married her partner of five years, José Manuel García, in July 2009. They have two children.
