= Good Manners (disambiguation) =

Good manners (etiquette) is the set of norms of personal behaviour in polite society.

Good Manners may also refer to:

- Good Manners (2017 film), a 2017 Brazilian–French film
- Good Manners (2023 film), a 2017 Spanish film

== See also ==
- Bad manners (disambiguation)
