= Co-Husbands =

- Theatrical release poster
- Spanish: Mari(dos)
- Directed by: Lucía Alemany
- Written by: Pablo Alén; Breixo Corral
- Produced by: Ghislain Barrois; Álvaro Augustin; Eneko Lizarraga Arratibel; Francisco Sánchez Ortiz
- Starring: Paco León; Ernesto Alterio; Lucía Gómez; Emma Hernández; Kirill Bunegin; Celia Freijeiro; Raúl Cimas; Jesús Olmedo
- Cinematography: Josu Inchaustegi
- Edited by: Raúl de Torres
- Music by: Vanessa Garde
- Production companies: Telecinco Cinema; Ciudadano Ciskul; Think Studio; Dos Maridos AIE
- Distributed by: Buena Vista International Spain
- Release date: 10 March 2023
- Country: Spain
- Language: Spanish
- Box office: €4.1 million

Co-Husbands (Spanish: Mari(dos)) is a 2023 Spanish buddy comedy film directed by Lucía Alemany and written by Pablo Alén and Breixo Corral which stars Paco León and Ernesto Alterio.

== Plot ==
In the wake of an avalanche in a ski resort Laura enters a coma. Toni and Emilio find out Laura had been living a double life, respectively as Emilio's and Toni's wife. As long as Laura does not awaken, they are forced to live together.

== Cast ==
- Paco León as Toni
- Ernesto Alterio as Emilio
- Celia Freijeiro as Laura
- Raúl Cimas
- Jesús Olmedo
- Lucía Gómez
- Emma Hernández
- Kirill Bunegin

== Production ==
The film was produced by Telecinco Cinema, Ciudadano Ciskul, Think Studio, and Dos Maridos AIE, and it had the participation of Mediaset España, Movistar Plus+, and Mediterráneo Mediaset España Group. Filming began on 21 February 2022. Shooting locations included the Aragonese Pyrenees. took over cinematography duties whilst scored the film.

== Release ==
Distributed by Buena Vista International Spain, Co-Husbands was released theatrically in Spain on 10 March 2023, becoming the highest-grossing film of its opening weekend.

== Reception ==
Juan Pando of Fotogramas rated the film 3 out of 5 stars, singling out the chemistry between León and Alterio as the best thing about the buddy movie.

Irene Crespo of Cinemanía rated Co-Husbands 3 out of 5 stars, concluding that it is not just another Spanish family comedy film.

Javier Ocaña of El País negatively pointed out two flaws around Paco León's character, namely, León being a better fit for Alterio's [chaotic] character and León's coming-and-going Catalan accent [in Spanish], otherwise assessing that Alemany gets it right by managing to direct a popular comedy without [recurring to too much] broad brush.

Raquel Hernández Luján of HobbyConsolas rated the film with 55 points ('so-so'), deeming it to be an uneven and tonally inconsistent comedy, otherwise highlighting Cimas' character and the musical score among its positive elements.

== See also ==
- List of Spanish films of 2023
