= Infiesto =

- Promotional release poster
- Directed by: Patxi Amezcua
- Screenplay by: Patxi Amezcua
- Produced by: Borja Pena; Emma Lustres
- Starring: Isak Férriz; Iria del Río
- Cinematography: Josu Incháustegui
- Edited by: Lucas Nolla
- Music by: Sergio Moure
- Production company: Vaca Films
- Distributed by: Netflix
- Release date: 3 February 2023
- Running time: 96 minutes
- Country: Spain
- Language: Spanish

Infiesto is a 2023 Spanish mystery thriller film written and directed by Patxi Amezcua which stars Isak Férriz and Iria del Río. Set in March 2020 in Infiesto, Piloña, against the backdrop of the enforcement of the COVID-19-related State of Alarm in Spain, the plot follows two inspectors arriving in the aforementioned village to investigate about a recently found missing woman.

== Plot ==
A young woman, Saioa, is found walking down a rural road in Spain, dirty and injured. She collapses in a parking lot and is identified as a missing person who disappeared three months earlier. With the country in the early stages of a COVID-19 lockdown, Federal police officers Inspector Samuel Garcia and Deputy Inspector Marta Castro are assigned to the case, working with minimal support due to the pandemic.

Saioa's mother, Julie, is notified, and she arrives at the hospital where her daughter remains unconscious. At the time of the kidnapping, suspicion had fallen on Saioa's stepfather, who had left Julie the day before Saioa's disappearance. Garcia and Castro question the hostile stepfather but find no new information, as he had already been investigated thoroughly.

When Saioa regains consciousness, her therapist, Paz, restricts questioning due to Saioa's fragile state. The only lead is a report from a driver who saw a young woman at a rural intersection. The detectives investigate the intersection and discover an old abandoned building where they find a young woman and a man who flees the scene. Garcia catches the man, but they just turn out to be pot growing hippies. They are released as irrelevant to the case.

The investigation takes a turn when another woman reports a kidnapping attempt by a known felon called "The Dog Killer," who lives near the intersection. The detectives go to the property where no one seems to be home. They find a makeshift bed in a barn. The Dog Killer shows up, and is able to explain the bed being used by his cousin whom he hunts with. The detectives leave, but they learn that sand, used in wine making, was found on Saioa. It likely matches the barrels of wine that were also in the barn. They return to the Dog Killer's house but find he has fled, after killing his dog. In the barn, they uncover a hidden room with evidence of captivity.

A roadblock leads to the Dog Killer's capture, but he commits suicide, declaring "It's only the beginning". The detectives then focus on his cousin, the presumed hunting mate. The cousin reveals the Dog Killer actually hunts with a friend known as "The Demon," who has psychological issues. At the Demon's trailer, Castro and Garcia narrowly escape a booby trap explosion. They find photographs of young people in white robes, hinting at a pattern of abductions every three months.

The Demon’s brother is identified as Saioa's stepfather. Garcia and Castro pressure him, learning about an abandoned building used by the Demon. A shootout at the building results in the Demon's capture. He also says "it's only the beginning" and reveals his membership in a cult led by "the Prophet" and which worships the Celtic god Taranis, demanding human sacrifices every three months. Saioa confirms a third person’s involvement.

Suspended from duty, for roughing up the Demon, Garcia notices in an old photogroah, a camp director wearing a Celtic straw doll and suspects him to be "The Prophet." He approaches local detective Ramos for help in identifying the Prophet. Ramos offers to take Garcia to the Prophet's old house. Simultaneously, Castro discovers a connection between Saioa’s branding and a patient at a mental hospital. She learns from Lidia Vega, a former cult member, that Ramos is the Prophet.

Garcia, suspecting Ramos, is shot by him, and Ramos escapes. Castro and police arrive too late but search a nearby abandoned mine. Following a hunch, Castro descends into the mine, confronts Ramos, and kills him after a brief shootout. Before his death the Prophet also calls out that it is the beginning of the end of the world.

The film concludes with Castro at the hospital with her recovering fiancé, as the news reports rising COVID-19 cases, hinting at the warning words of the Prophet and his cult followers.

== Cast ==
- Isak Férriz as inspector jefe Samuel García
- Iria del Río as subinspectora Castro
- José Manuel Poga as el Demonio
- Luis Zahera
- Patricia Defran
- Juan Fernández as comisario Basterra
- Ismael Fristchi as Mataperros
- Isabel Naveira as Paz Nogueira
- Ana Villa as Julia
- María Mera as Lidia Vega

== Production ==
Infiesto is a Vaca Films production. Filming took over 7 weeks, taking place in Asturian and Galician locations, including Infiesto, the San Rafael Hospital in A Coruña, and the San Amaro Hermitage in Seoane, Forcarei.

== Release ==
The film debuted on Netflix streaming on 3 February 2023.

== See also ==
- List of Spanish films of 2023
