= Clara Sanchez =

Clara Sanchez may refer to:

- Clara Sanchez (cyclist) (born 1983), French track cyclist
- Clara Sánchez (writer) (born 1955), Spanish novelist
