= Amanece (film) =

- Theatrical release poster
- Directed by: Juan Francisco Viruega
- Screenplay by: Juan Francisco Viruega
- Produced by: Joaquín Hidalgo; Juan Francisco Viruega
- Starring: Iria del Río; Aura Garrido; Isabel Ampudia; Antonio Gómiz; Rafa Jiménez; Sebastián Haro; Rebeca Sala
- Cinematography: Pepe de la Rosa
- Edited by: Mikel Iribarren
- Music by: Tagore González
- Production companies: Amanece Audiovisual AIE; Factoría de Creación; Juan Francisco Viruega
- Distributed by: Syldavia Cinema
- Release dates: 28 September 2023 (Zinemaldia); 17 November 2023 (Spain)
- Country: Spain
- Language: Spanish

Amanece is a 2023 Spanish drama film written and directed by Juan Francisco Viruega (in his directorial debut feature) which stars Aura Garrido, Iria del Río, and Isabel Ampudia.

== Plot ==
After ending a relationship with her significant other, Alba returns home, a place where she left her younger sister and her mother, now very ill.

== Cast ==
- Aura Garrido as Alba
- Iria del Río as Candela
- Isabel Ampudia as Aurora
- Antonio Araque
- Rafa Jiménez
- Antonio Gómiz
- Sebastián Haro
- Rebeca Sala

== Production ==
The film is an Amanece Audiovisual AIE, Juan Francisco Viruega, and Factoría de Creación production, with the participation of Canal Sur and backing from Diputación de Almería, Almería Film Festival, Escuela Universitaria de Artes TAI, Mubox Studio and La Pañoleta Films. Shooting locations in the province of Almería included the Tabernas Desert and the Cabo de Gata.

== Release ==
The film had its world premiere in the 'Made in Spain' programme of the 71st San Sebastián International Film Festival on 28 September 2023. Distributed by Syldavia Cinema, it was released theatrically in Spain on 17 November 2023.

== Reception ==
Ekaitz Ortega of HobbyConsolas rated the film with 63 points ('acceptable'), citing the performances, the cinematography, and its ambition as hallmarks while citing punctual writing issues and the film's pace as its worst features.

Manuel J. Lombardo of Diario de Sevilla rated the film with 2 stars, writing that the helmer's search for "lyricism and the symbolism of maternal-filial bonds" is not always [adequately] accompanied by the "performances and the somewhat pretentious, overbearing and transcendental tone".

Oti Rodríguez Marchante of ABC rated the film 3 out of 5 stars, stressing that, rather than the story itself, the really essential bits about the film are the way it tells it and the excellent presence and performances delivered by Garrido, del Río, and the "impressive" Isabel Ampudia.

== Accolades ==
| Year | Award | Category | Nominee(s) | Result | Ref. |
|---|---|---|---|---|---|
| 2024 | 3rd Carmen Awards | Best Supporting Actor | Sebastián Haro | Nominated | |

== See also ==
- List of Spanish films of 2023
