= Bad manners =

Bad manners or Bad Manners may refer to:

- Bad manners, a lapse in etiquette
- Bad Manners, an English two-tone and ska band
- Bad Manners (1984 film), an American teen comedy
- "Bad Manners", a song on Freda Payne's 1995 album The (Unauthorized) I Hate Barney Songbook: A Parody
- Bad Manners (1997 film), an American comedy–drama
- Bad Manners (2023 film), an Indian Kannada-language action-drama

== See also ==
- Good Manners (disambiguation)
