= One Hell of a Holiday! =

- Theatrical release poster
- Directed by: Víctor García León
- Screenplay by: Manuel Burque; Josep Gatell
- Starring: Toni Acosta; Ernesto Sevilla; Tito Valverde; Gracia Olayo; Ramón Barea
- Production companies: Telecinco Cinema; Quexito Films; Aliwood; Creced y Multiplicaos AIE
- Distributed by: Universal Pictures International Spain
- Release date: 21 April 2023
- Country: Spain
- Language: Spanish
- Box office: €4.8 million

One Hell of a Holiday! (Spanish: ¡Vaya vacaciones!; previously known under the working title No haberlos tenido, lit. 'Not having had them') is a 2023 Spanish comedy film directed by Víctor García León from a screenplay by Manuel Burque and Josep Gatell. It features Toni Acosta, Ernesto Sevilla, Tito Valverde, Gracia Olayo, and Ramón Barea.

== Plot ==
Upon being forcefully tasked with babysitting their grandchildren Carla, Guille and Ali (thus ruining their planned holiday trip) while the latter's parents deceptively claim to be working, José and Manuela rebel, hatching a plan to psychologically torture their grandchildren, so the latter can plead to be "rescued".

== Cast ==
- Toni Acosta
- Ernesto Sevilla
- Tito Valverde as José
- Gracia Olayo as Manuela
- Ramón Barea
- Nuria Herrero
- Nicolás Costi
- Daniela Rubio
- Marta de Toro
- Ricardo Mas

== Production ==
The screenplay was penned by Manuel Burque and Josep Gatell. The film was produced by Telecinco Cinema, Quexito Films, Aliwood, and Creced y Multiplicaos AIE, with the participation of Mediaset España, Movistar Plus+, and Mediterráneo Mediaset España Group. Filming began on 8 August 2021, in locations of the provinces of Valencia and Alicante.

== Release ==
Distributed by Universal Pictures International Spain, the film was released theatrically in Spain on 21 April 2023.

== Reception ==
Juan Pando of Fotogramas rated the film 3 out of 5 stars, highlighting a Goya Award-worthy [performance by] Tito Valverde as the best thing about it.

Manuel J. Lombardo of Diario de Sevilla rated the film 2 out of 5 stars, deeming its brand of humor somewhat of an improved version of the template of Santiago Segura's mainstream comedies, and overall "a decent little adventure in which one can recognize something more than the routine of filming a commissioned script".

Javier Escribano of HobbyConsolas rated the film with 65 points ('acceptable') deeming it to be "entertaining and balanced for children and adults, although not very original".

== See also ==
- List of Spanish films of 2023
