= Zorro (Spanish TV series) =

Spanish television series

- Genre: Action; Adventure; Drama; Superhero
- Created by: Carlos Portela
- Based on: Characters by Johnston McCulley
- Directed by: Javier Quintas; Jorge Saavedra; José Luis Alegría
- Starring: Miguel Bernardeau; Renata Notni; Dalia Xiuhcoatl; Paco Tous; Peter Vives; Elia Galera; Andrés Almeida; Emiliano Zurita
- Composers: Iván Martínez Lacámara; Álvaro Peire
- Country of origin: Spain
- Original language: Spanish
- No. of seasons: 1
- No. of episodes: 10

Production
- Executive producers: David Martínez; David Cotarelo; Angela Agudo; Sergio Pizzolante; Andy Kaplan; Jesús Torres-Viera; John Gertz; Glenda Pacanins
- Running time: 52 minutes
- Production companies: Secuoya Studios; Amazon MGM Studios

Original release
- Network: Amazon Prime Video
- Release: January 19, 2024

Zorro is a Spanish action-adventure television series produced by Secuoya Studio and starring Miguel Bernardeau. Based on the character created by Johnston McCulley, the series debuted on Prime Video in Latin America and the United States on January 19, 2024 and in Spain, Andorra and Portugal on January 25th. The production, filmed from summer 2022 to early 2023 in the Canary Islands in Spain, represents a "bold reinterpretation" of the classic hero El Zorro.

== Plot ==
Zorro is set in 1834 and follows Diego de la Vega, a young landowner with a personal vendetta who also masquerades as Zorro, a masked vigilante who defends California's oppressed.

== Cast ==
- Miguel Bernardeau as Diego de la Vega / Zorro
- Renata Notni as Lolita Márquez
- Rodolfo Sancho as Gobernador Pedro Victoria
- Dalia Xiuhcoatl as Nah-Lin / Fake Zorro
- Paco Tous as Bernardo
- Peter Vives as Janus Carter
- Elia Galera as Lucía Márquez
- Andrés Almeida as Tadeo Márquez
- Emiliano Zurita as Enrique Sánchez de Monasterio
- Chacha Huang as Mei
- Joel Bosqued as Samael
- Francisco Reyes as Vanderveen
- Mireia Mambo as Harriet Jones
- Estibalitz Ruiz as Carmen de la Madrid
- Ana Layevska as Irina Ivanova
- Eva Camacho as Margarita
- Christian Vázquez as Ramírez
- Alosian Vivancos as Francisco de la Madrid
- Toni Zenet as Doctor Ros
- Oleg Kricunova as Andreyevich
- Carlos Wu as Tchang
- Fele Martínez as Don Antonio
- Cristo Fernández as the previous Zorro, Nah-Lin's elder brother
- Cecilia Suárez as Guadalupe
- Luis Tosar as Alejandro de la Vega

== Episodes ==
No.	Title	Directed by	Written by	Original release date
1	"The Chosen One"	Javier Quintas	Carlos Portela	January 19, 2024 (Note: The series was released on Prime Video on January 19, 2024 in Latin America and the United States, and on January 25 in Spain, Andorra and Portugal)
One night, Alejandro de la Vega fights three unknown masked men. Zorro helps him and kills one of the three. But after Zorro leaves, Alejandro is killed by an unknown killer. Soon after, Zorro is gravely wounded by soldiers under Gobernador (or Governor) Pedro Victoria, who orders his second-in-command Captain Monasterio to burn the church where Zorro is hiding. Trapped, Zorro commits suicide. His friends the Indians retrieve his body. Don Diego de la Vega, Alejandro's son, leaves Spain and returns to California after he learns of his father's death. He finds Lolita, his love interest, his family and his friend Bernardo. After having met Cuervo Nocturno, Diego finally agrees to become Zorro to protect innocent people and serve justice, but Nah-Lin, the young sister of the first Zorro, swears revenge.
2	"Inheritance"	Javier Quintas	Carlos Portela	January 19, 2024
Nah-Lin fights Diego and takes Zorro's mantle. Later, Diego and Lolita are taken prisoners by a bandit and his gang. He wants Zorro or he will kill all the hostages. He reveals that his father was a soldier killed by the first Zorro. The manager reveals that the bandit's father was a corrupt soldier. Hearing this, the bandit kills him, Nah-Lin as Zorro arrives and fights him. Gobernador Victoria sends Monasterio and his soldiers to resolve the problem. The bandit is killed, but Lolita is wounded. Diego saves her and later creates a new mantle. He stops the bandits and gives the money to the poor.
3	"The Bet"	Jorge Saavedra	Carlos Portela	January 19, 2024
Diego as Zorro helps Mei, a young Chinese who has been sold to Francisco Ramirez. Diego discovers that Ramirez is a slaver and could be implicated in Alejandro's death. Later, Zorro returns to Ramirez's home, but is captured. Ramirez unmasks him and is amused to discover that Diego is Zorro. He prepares to kill him for everything and his father's betrayal, but Ramirez's house is attacked.
4	"Revenge"	Jorge Saavedra	Carlos Portela	January 19, 2024
Nah-Lin kills Ramirez and wounds Diego, leaving him dying. Mei finds him and heals him with Bernardo's help. She discovers that Diego is Zorro and becomes one of his friends. Diego goes to find Nah-Lin to convince her that she is following the wrong path. Soldiers find them and they flee, but some of Nah-lin's men are captured. Hearing about his brother's death, Jose Antonio Ramirez decides to go in California. Samael, a professional killer, is approached by John Marc Zeck and hired by Vanderveen to accomplish a mission.
5	"The Execution"	Javier Quintas	Carlos Portela	January 19, 2024
Having recovered of her wounds, Lolita says that she will marry Monasterio after he captures Zorro. Nah-Lin captures Jose Ramirez and demands her men or he will die. Diego convinces her to free him. Monasterio finds Ramirez and takes him to Gobernador Victoria's home, but Victoria kills Ramirez soon after because he had promised to sell the mines to Andreyevich and his partner Irina Ivanova. Later, Diego and Nah-Lin team up to free the Indians. Diego learns Victoria's plan and thanks to his friends reveals the sale.
6	"Mask Games"	Javier Quintas	Carlos Portela	January 19, 2024
Victoria is forced to sell the mines publicly. The mines are won and sold to the Chinese led by Mr Tchang, Mei's former boss. Diego is kidnapped by the Bear's clan, a group of Californians who want to free California. They reveal that his father was one of their members. Diego discovers that Francisco Ramirez was also one of them. Nah-Lin tries to kill Monasterio because, forced by Victoria, he killed one of her friends, but Lolita injures her and she is captured. Diego finds the cart that the Bear's clan had used to kidnap him. He thinks that Tadeo, Lolita's father, is a member of the clan.
7	"The Myth"	Jorge Saavedra	Carlos Portela	January 19, 2024
One of Nah-Lin's followers finds Diego and asks him to free Nah-Lin or he will reveal that Diego is Zorro. Diego makes a plan to free Nah-Lin, but not everything goes as planned. Nah-Lin is finally free, but swears vengeance if Diego continues to be Zorro. Andreyevich, furious at being betrayed by Victoria, kills him but is betrayed and killed by Irina, who becomes the leader and starts rumors that Zorro killed Victoria and Andreyevich. During Gobernador Victoria's funeral, Monasterio becomes the new Gobernador and swears to capture Zorro.
8	"The Wedding"	Jorge Saavedra	Carlos Portela	January 19, 2024
Nah-Lin discovers that Lolita is Diego's weakness and plan to spill her blood during her marriage, but Diego as Zorro kidnaps Lolita to protect her. Finally, Lolita frees herself and Nah-Lin decides to attack Lolita's home to take food. After a brief battle, Lolita and Nah-Lin are the only survivors. Lolita wounds Nah-Lin and prepares to kill her, but Diego as Zorro stops her and flees with Nah-Lin. They decide to fight to the death to decide who will be Zorro once and for all. Nah-Lin is about to kill Diego, but when she sees the fox's spirit in his eyes, she redeems herself and renounces being Zorro. The Bear's clan asks to Diego to kill Monasterio in one month as proof that he is worthy to be one of them. Meanwhile, Samael and Zeck meet Guadalupe, Alejandro's former love, who plans to take her legacy. Finally, Lolita and Monasterio marry and Diego is left heartbroken.
9	"Unmasked"	José Luis Alegría	Javier Quintas/Carlos Portela	January 19, 2024
Lolita reveals to Diego that she knows that he is Zorro, that she discovered it when he stopped her from killing Nah-Lin. Diego reveals to her that the Bear's clan is responsible for Alejandro's death and that they are forcing him to kill Monasterio. She agrees to help him. They unmask almost all of the clan's main members: first, Francisco Diaz de la Madrid and his sister Carmen. Diego as Zorro kills Francisco in a fight and marks Carmen with a Z on her face. Then he unmasks the padre Don Antonio. Nah-Lin avenges his brother by blinding Don Antonio. Diego is persuaded that Tadeo is a member of the Bear's clan, but is stabbed by Lucia Marquez, Lolita's mother, who is revealed to be the true member and leader of the Bear's clan and his father's murderer. He flees just in time before she can shoot him. Meanwhile, Guadalupe makes Samael become her son, and Samael kills Zeck, judging him useless once his work is done. Soon after, they arrive in Los Angeles.
10	"The Three Funeral Dance"	Javier Quintas	Carlos Portela	January 19, 2024
Diego meets Samael and Guadalupe, Bernardo is shocked to see her after all these years. Diego guesses that they are crooks. Lolita is furious with Diego after he tried to kill her mother, but he reveals her that her mother is a member of the Bear's clan and the murderer of his father. Lolita does not believe it, but Diego convinces her and plans to stop this threat once and for all. Diego dressed as Zorro reveals himself during Lolita's party and fights Monasterio, killing him. After this, Lucia reveals herself to Diego as well as Carmen; they invite him to join them and the Bear's Clan, revealing that they have a small army, but Diego uses a gun to summon soldiers and Monasterio is revealed to be still alive; it was all part of Diego's plan to destroy the clan. A battle begins, Carmen succeeds in escaping, Lucia fights Diego and reveals that his father wanted to sell them and California to the Americans and to Vanderveen, and she killed him for this. She is about to kill Diego, but Lolita saves him by shooting her mother, injuring her. The clan is destroyed and Lucia is arrested. Lolita dismisses Diego, because even though he was right about Lucia he has destroyed her family, but she promises him that his secret will be safe with her. Tadeo joins his lover Irina, but she kills him and makes it look like suicide. Carmen is wanted. Lucia is sent in jail but freed soon after and allies with Irina, becoming partners and possibly lovers. Diego goes with Mei to New York to see Vanderveen. Before his departure, he gives a gift to Nah-Lin; she becomes Red Snake and they become friends. Two months later, Diego writes Vanderveen a letter, which makes him order his henchmen to burn the hotel Diego is staying in, unaware that Diego as Zorro is listening from above in Vanderveen's tower.

== Production ==
=== Filming ===
Zorro took eight months to shoot, from July 2022 to February 2023, in the Canary Islands. Cameras shot in the municipalities of Las Palmas, Arucas, Gáldar, San Bartolomé de Tirajana and Telde, as well as in Del Nublo Park and the Tejera volcanic basin. The Sioux City Park on the island of Gran Canaria, meanwhile, was closed to the public for the duration of filming, in order to build the main sets and shoot part of the series.

The series became available on Amazon Prime Video on January 19, 2024.

== Release ==
On July 17, 2023, Amazon Prime Video unveiled the first image of Miguel Bernardeau in the Zorro costume. The series was made available on Prime Video on January 19, 2024 in Latin America and the United States and on January 25 in Spain, Andorra and Portugal.

== See also ==
- Zorro, a French series based on the Zorro character that also released in 2024
