= To Talk For The Sake Of Talking =

To Talk For The Sake Of Talking (Hablar por hablar in Spanish, Parlar per parlar in Catalan) is a nighttime radio talk show broadcast by Cadena SER in Spain and Radio Caracol in Colombia.

The show was created by Gemma Nierga for Radio Barcelona in 1989. In its 2007 spring season, it had an audience average of 604,000 listeners.

The program receives telephone calls from listeners who express their problems or opinions and receive advice and feedback.

== Seasons ==
=== Cadena Ser and Radio Barcelona (Cadena Ser) in Spain ===
Parlar per parlar (in Catalan and Spanish for Catalonia and Andorra)

Presenter	Radio station	Season
Gemma Nierga	Radio Barcelona (Cadena SER)	1989–1997
Raquel Aturia	Radio Barcelona (Cadena SER)	2008–2009

Hablar por hablar(in Spanish for all Spain)

Presenter	Radio station	Season
Fina Rodríguez	Cadena SER	1997–2001
Mara Torres	Cadena SER	2001–2006
Paqui Ramos	Cadena SER	holiday time 2004–2006
Cristina Lasvignes	Cadena SER	2007–2009
Paloma Delgado	Cadena SER	holiday time 2007–2008
Macarena Berlín	Cadena SER	2009-Current
Almudena Navarro	Cadena SER	holiday time 2012

=== Radio Caracol in Colombia ===
Hablar por hablar

Presenter	Radio station	Season
Diana Montoya	Radio Caracol	2007–2009

== See also ==
- Cadena SER
- Radio Caracol
