= El hotel de los líos. García y García 2 =

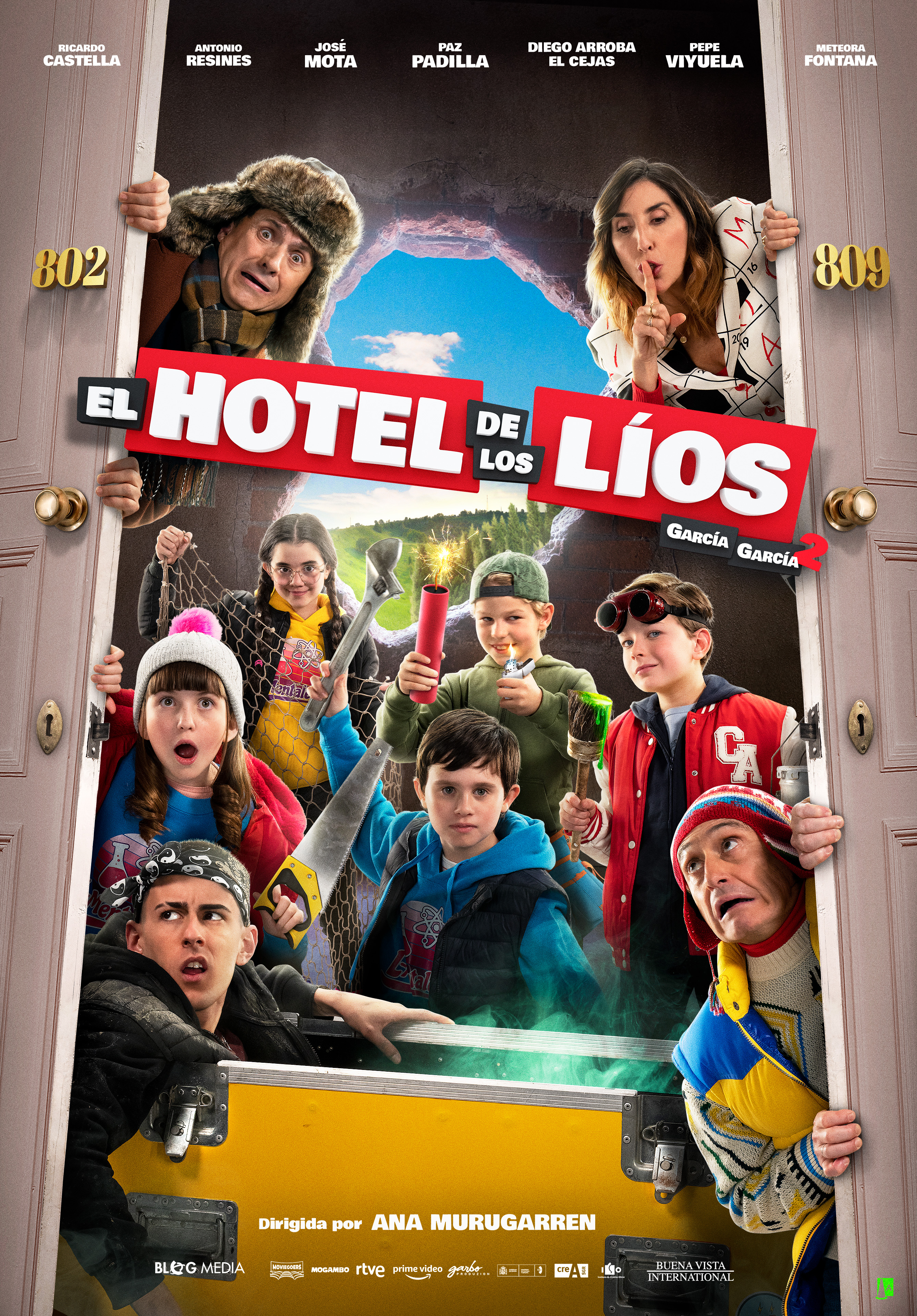
- Film poster
- Directed by: Ana Murugarren
- Screenplay by: Ana Murugarren; Ana Galán
- Produced by: Joaquín Trincado
- Starring: Ricardo Castella; Antonio Resines; José Mota; Paz Padilla; Diego Arroba el Cejas; Pepe Viyuela; Meteora Fontana
- Cinematography: Josu Inchaustegui
- Edited by: David Tomás Kinki
- Music by: Aitzol Saratxaga
- Production companies: Blogmedia; Moviegoers AIE; Garbo Produzioni
- Distributed by: Buena Vista International
- Release dates: 17 March 2023 (Málaga); 24 March 2023 (Spain)
- Countries: Spain; Italy
- Language: Spanish

El hotel de los líos. García y García 2 is a 2023 Spanish-Italian children comedy film directed by Ana Murugarren which stars Ricardo Castella, Antonio Resines, José Mota, Paz Padilla, Diego Arroba "el Cejas", Pepe Viyuela, and Meteora Fontana. It is a sequel to 2021 film García y García.

== Plot ==
Javier García and Javier García get a run-down hotel that they decide to restore, and it fills it with gifted children scientists, while the threat posed by the wicked Benito Camarena, hellbent on seizing a booty hidden in the building, looms in.

== Cast ==
- José Mota as Javier García
- Pepe Viyuela as Javier García
- Paz Padilla as Martina
- Antonio Resines as Alberto Flecha
- Diego Arroba "El Cejas"
- Carla Chiorazzo es Luna
- Carlos Morollón as Lucas
- Daniela Casas as Lola
- Mikel Losada as Benito Camarena
- Meteora Fontana
- Ricardo Castella
- Pablo Fernández
- Ettore Colombo

== Production ==
The film is a Blogmedia, Moviegoers AIE, and Garbo Produzioni Spanish-Italian co-production, and it had the participation of Mogambo, RTVE, and Prime Video.

== Release ==
The film was presented in the non-competitive 'Málaga Premiere' section of the 26th Málaga Film Festival on 17 March 2023. Distributed by Buena Vista International, it was released theatrically in Spain on 24 March 2023.

== Reception ==
Raquel Hernández Luján of HobbyConsolas rated the film with 50 points ('so so') deeming it to be a "white and unsubstantial" madcap family comedy.

Salvador Llopart of La Vanguardia rated the film 1 out of 5 stars, writing that [it displays] a "naïf and naughty humor that, sometimes, even makes you smile. Other times, it makes you blush".

== See also ==
- List of Spanish films of 2023
