= Gemma Nierga =

Spanish journalist

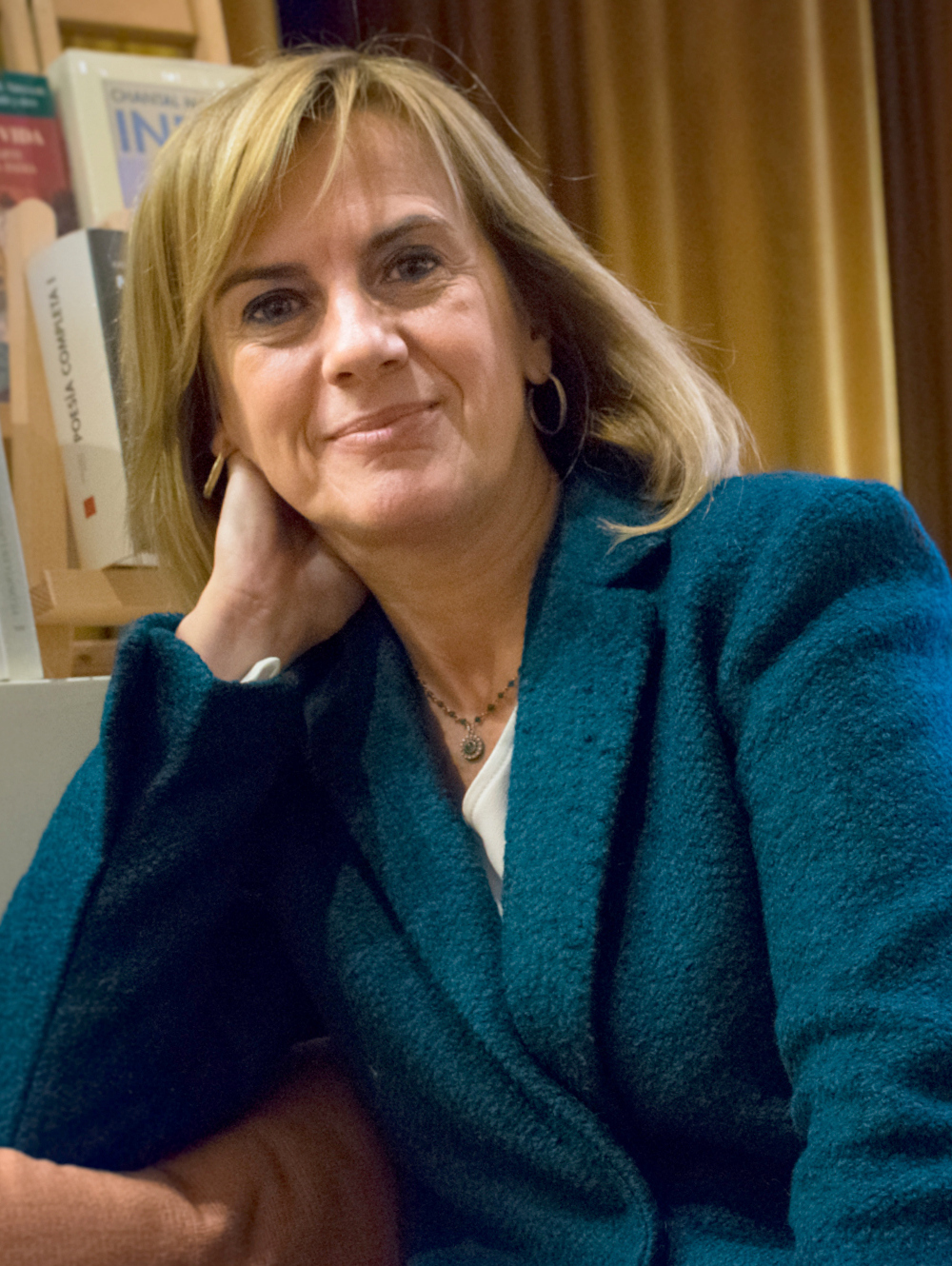
- Born: Gemma Nierga Barris; 1 November 1965 (age 60); Girona, Spain
- Education: Autonomous University of Barcelona
- Occupations: Journalist; presenter
- Years active: 1984–present
- Employer(s): Cadena Ser, TV3, TVE
- Spouse: José Antonio Cabanillas (2004–present)
- Awards: Ondas Award (1997, 2000, 2007); Antena de Oro (2008); Quim Regàs (2013)

Gemma Nierga Barris (born 1 November 1965) is a Spanish journalist who has spent most of her professional career as a radio and television presenter. Among other programs, she is known for directing and presenting La Ventana from 1997 to 2012 and Hoy por hoy from 2012 to 2017, both on Cadena SER radio.

== Biography ==
Gemma Nierga earned a licentiate in journalism from the Autonomous University of Barcelona, where she studied photojournalism under Manel Armengol. She entered the public eye in 1984 as the presenter of a film program on Radio Vilassar de Dalt, as well as appearing on Calella Televisión in Maresme, Barcelona. In 1985 she moved to Cadena 13 in Barcelona, after which she joined TV3 to present the show Dit i fet from 1987 to 1989.

In 1987 she joined Cadena SER's Ràdio Barcelona. She began as a reporter on a morning program, and later moved to the evening lineup, creating the program To Talk For The Sake Of Talking, which was carried on SER stations in Catalonia. In 1994 it was broadcast throughout Spain, and expanded to Chile and Colombia in 2003. She also worked on SER's cultural, current events, and interview shows, most prominently the news program Hora 25.

At the same time, she continued to present several programs on TV3, such as Tres senyores i un senyor, Pares i fills, and Tothom per tothom (all of which premiered in 1993). In 1995, she presented the program El destino en sus manos on Televisión Española (TVE) and, in 1997, Hablando con Gemma, broadcast on the regional channels Nou, Telemadrid, Euskal Telebista, and Canal Sur.

Nierga won an Ondas Award for To Talk For The Sake Of Talking in 1997. She is also the author of a book by the same title (Spanish: Hablar por hablar; Catalan: Parlar per parlar), in which she relates her experiences on the show.

In 1997, after the departure of Javier Sardà, she took over the Cadena SER radio program La ventana, the ratings leader in its time slot. With this program she won the 2000 International Ondas Award for children's tertulia.

Following the assassination of her friend Ernest Lluch by the separatist group ETA on 21 November 2000, she was the subject of great controversy when she made the following statements at a march protesting the murder:

Ernest would have tried to have talked to the person who killed him. Those of you who have it in your power, please talk.

Jordi Pujol, in his second book of memoirs, recalls the demonstration and Nierga's words. They were addressed to Prime Minister José María Aznar, who asked the president of the Generalitat, "And with whom do I have to talk?"

Aznar had already spoken with ETA during a truce that had ended in failure. Now ETA had just killed the person from the other ideological sensitivity who also possessed the will for dialogue. The journalist's words were well received by the people, but they were neither realistic nor fair.

In July 2004, Nierga married José Antonio Cabanillas, lieutenant mayor for the United Left in the city of Córdoba, where she went to reside. In September 2005, their son Pau was born.

In 2005, the Observatory against Domestic and Gender Violence presented her with its Recognition Award for her work in the eradication of domestic and gender violence in the media. On 24 October 2007, she received an Ondas Distinguished Career award for hosting La ventana for 10 years.

After a decade away from television, on 11 April 2008, she premiered the weekly talk show Ya te vale on the TVE channel La 1, an adaptation of the BBC program What Kids Really Think, where children interview celebrity guests. This was a nationwide version of No em ratllis, which Julia Otero had presented on TV3 in Catalonia. On TVE the program lasted two months, with low ratings.

In July 2008, Nierga received the Antena de Oro for directing and presenting La ventana. That September she moved back to Barcelona with her husband and son, where she continued to direct and present the program daily. During the first months of the 2009 season, she was replaced by Marta González Novo for the birth of her second child, Arnau.

She narrated LaSexta's documentary Baby Boom in April 2012, a Spanish version of the Channel 4 program One Born Every Minute. Beginning on 3 September of that year, she and Pepa Bueno presented the Cadena SER radio program Hoy por hoy, where she remained until July 2017, when SER informed her that they would not renew her contract.

In May 2013 she received the Quim Regàs Journalism Award for her "multifaceted, long, and prolific" career in the field.

In November 2017, Nierga received the Non-sexist Communication Award for her career from the Association of Women Journalists of Catalonia. That month, 8TV announced signing her to cover the Catalan electoral campaign before the elections convened on 21 December. In January 2018, she joined Telecinco to write for El programa de Ana Rosa. In March 2018 she began presenting Mis padres on TV3.

On 21 September 2020, she began presenting Cafè d'idees, produced by RTVE Catalunya and broadcast simultaneously on La 2 and Ràdio 4. In 2024, she combined Cafè d'idees on TVE with the debate program 59 segundos, which aired for six months.
