= Pipi Wobaho =

Beninese singer and actor

- Born: Simplice Behanzin; Cotonou, Benin
- Occupations: Comedian, singer, actor
- Years active: 1987–present

Simplice Behanzin, popularly known by his stage name Pipi Wobaho, is a Beninese singer, comedian and actor. He is the founding member of the 'Sèmako Wobaho theater and cinema company'.

== Personal life ==
Wobaho was born in Cotonou, Benin.

== Career ==
He began his theater career with his brother Arnaud Behanzin and Dah Houawé. In 1987, they formed a group formerly called "Gbenonkpo". It is a theater and cinema company bringing together several Beninese actors.

He is also a popular actor in Beninese theater and cinema. In 2003, Wobaho, along with his closest friend Pierre Zinko aka Wet Elephant, founded the "Sèmako Wobaho theater and cinema company" to improve the quality of Beninese cinema and theater. Their collaboration leads to several theatrical works on the Beninese scene. However, they broke up in 2013. In 2008, the company produced the popular film If It Were You?, a series resulting from a collaboration with several other Beninese comedians. In 2012, the Sèmako Wobaho duo made the film Capricious Apprentice.

Wobaho is a specialist in traditional "Akonhou" music. In 2011, he released an album called Akonhou djobé. He acted in two popular films Sorry (continued) and New Dot Method, which is a video album of two films at 1000F Cfa, presented by Agbafafa production.

In November 2014, Wobaho was elected to the Ministry of Culture. Later in 2015, he was elected as head of the National Commission for the Fight against Piracy.

== Filmography ==
Year	Film	Roles	Ref.
2007	If It Was You?		
2008	Vicious Daddy		
2008	Temptation of Faith		
2008	Black Wink		
2009	The Adulterous Woman		
2009	Glossomodo Debate		
2009	Hot Baba		
2009	The Box Law		
2009	Rudeness		
2009	Crazy Emotion		
2010	The Wrath of the Fisherman		
2010	Scandal Home		
2010	Bulky Visitor		
2011	Ah Men 2!		
2011	Scandal at Home		
2011	Grandpa JP		
2012	Capricious Apprentice		
