= Francisco Reyes (actor) =

Spanish actor

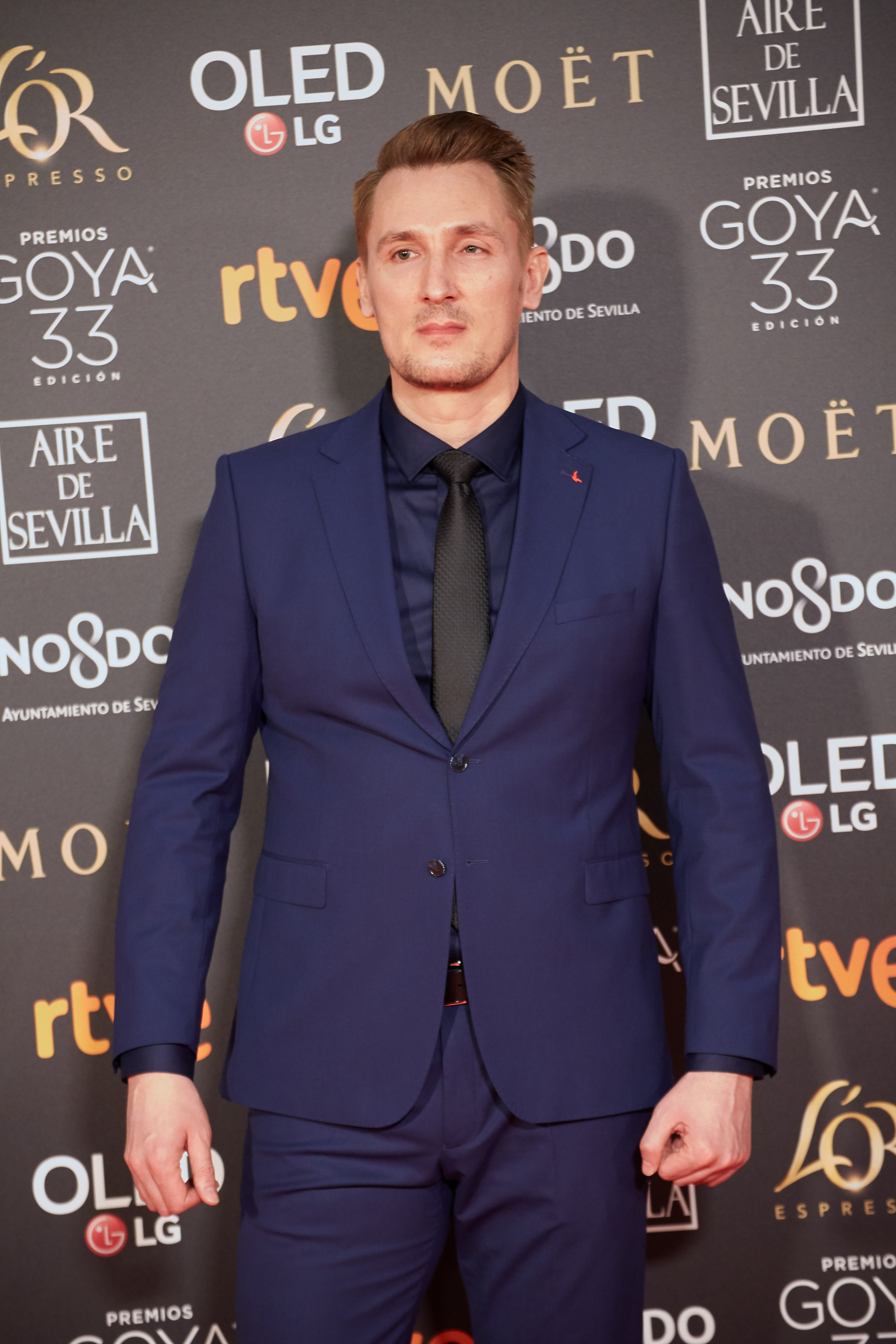
Reyes attending the red carpet of the 2019 Goya Awards

Francisco Reyes is a Spanish stage, film, and television actor.

== Biography ==
He trained as an actor at the Madrid's RESAD, but developed his early career as an actor in New York theatres from 2004 to 2018. He featured in Juan Mayorga's play Himmelweg (Way to Heaven) as a Nazi officer, earning critical acclaim and winning an HOLA Award for Outstanding Performance By A Male Actor in 2011.

Reyes' performance as Rodrigo Alvarado in Rodrigo Sorogoyen's political thriller The Realm (2018) earned him a nomination to the Goya Award for Best New Actor at the 33rd Goya Awards.

Early television work include appearances in Vergüenza and Paquita Salas. He has since featured in several film and television roles, including a SS commander in zombie action film Valley of the Dead (2020), Lagrange in 30 Coins, Winters, a villanous hitman opposed to the title character in satirical spy series ¡García!, riot-police agent Trajano in Asedio (2023), or villainous Vanderveen in swashbuckler series Zorro (2024).

== Filmography ==
Year	Title	Role	Notes	Ref.
2018	El reino (The Realm)	Alvarado		
2020-	30 monedas (30 Coins)	Lagrange		
2022	¡García! (García!)	Winters		
2023	Asedio	Trajano		
2024	Zorro	Vanderveen		

== Accolades ==
Year	Award	Category	Work	Result	Ref.
2011	HOLA Awards	Outstanding Performance By A Male Actor (Theatre)	Himmelweg	Won	
2019	74th CEC Medals	Best New Actor	The Realm	Nominated	
2019	33rd Goya Awards	Best New Actor	The Realm	Nominated	
