= Eléphant Mouillé =

Beninese singer and actor (born 1969)

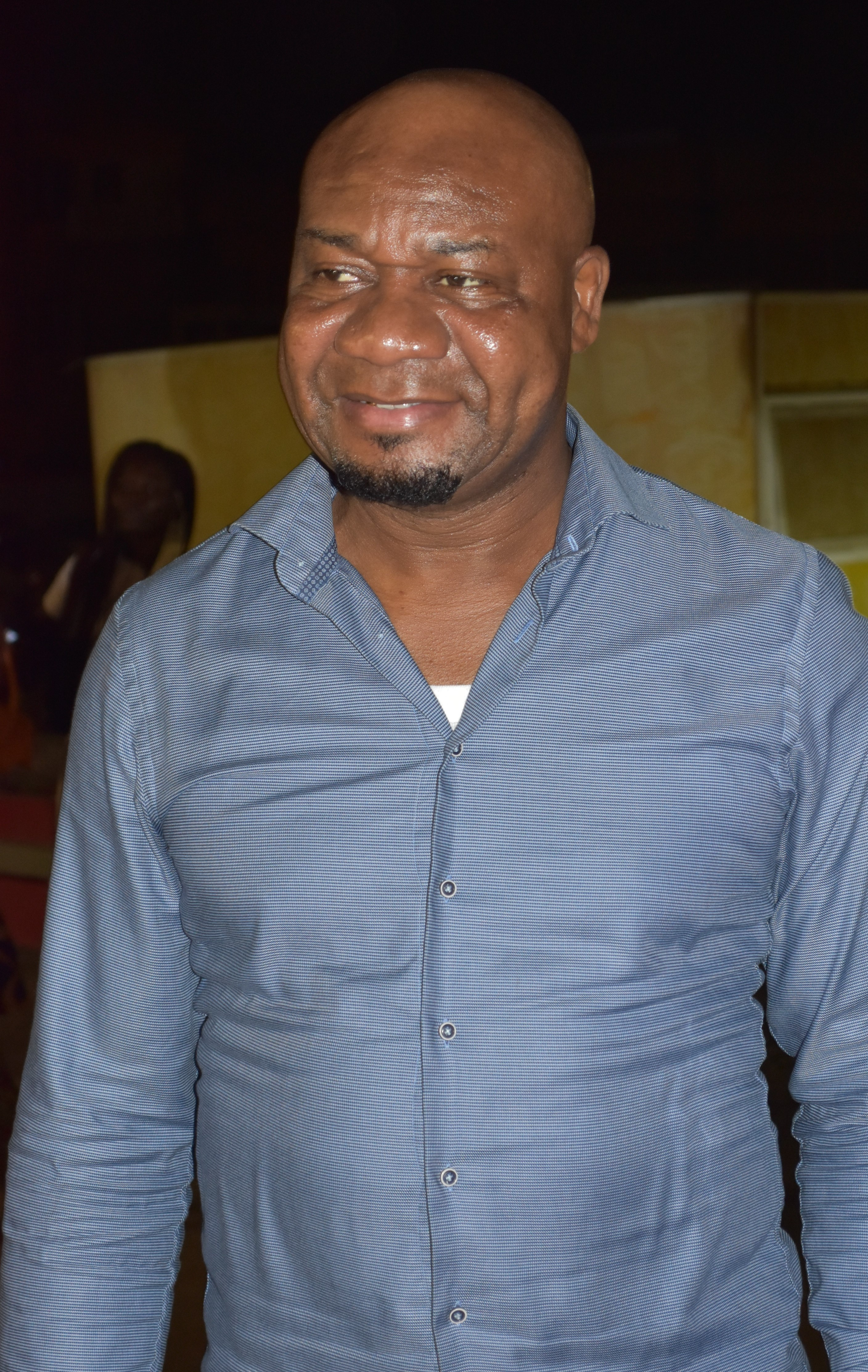
- Eléphant Mouillé at a film festival in 2022
- Born: Pierre Zinko; 1969 (age 56–57); Bohicon, Benin
- Occupations: Comedian, singer, actor
- Years active: 1992–present

Pierre Zinko (born 1969), popularly known by his stage name Eléphant Mouillé, is a Beninese singer, comedian and actor. He is one of the founding member of the 'Sèmako Wobaho theater and cinema company'. He is also a popular actor in Beninese theater and cinema.

== Personal life ==
Zinko was born in 1969 in Bohicon, Benin.

== Career ==
At the age of 12, Zinko started out as a motorcycle mechanic. At the time, its artistic performances were limited to theatrical events. In 1986, he obtained his final apprenticeship diploma in mechanics. Then Wet Elephant moved to Cotonou with the aim of setting up his workshop. However, he embarked on artistic projects in Cotonou when he met Pipi Wobaho.

In 1996, Wobaho along with his closest friend Simplice Behanzin aka Pipi Wobaho founded the "Sèmako Wobaho theater and cinema company" to improve the quality of Beninese cinema and theater. Their collaboration leads to several theatrical works on the Beninese scene. In 2010 with the company Sèmako Wobaho, they get the gold disc to the 4th edition of the festival "Africa Day" through their theater company in the TV movie category. However, they broke up in 2013. In 2008, the company produced popular film If it was you?, a series resulting from a collaboration with several other Beninese comedians. In 2012, the Sèmako Wobaho duo made the film Capricious Apprentice.

Wet Elephant has conducted more than 500 shows in Benin. He has a career spanned outside from 1986 to 2019 with more than 100 awards and 200 appearances in artist music videos. He also appeared in about 41 films, of which 20 are directed by himself as writer-director and producer.

In 2019, he celebrated 25 years of artistic career.

== Filmography ==
| Year | Film | Roles | Ref. |
|---|---|---|---|
| 2007 | If It Was You? | | |
| 2008 | Vicious Daddy | | |
| 2008 | Temptation of Faith | | |
| 2008 | Black Wink | | |
| 2009 | The Adulterous Woman | | |
| 2009 | Glossomodo Debate | | |
| 2009 | Hot Baba | | |
| 2009 | The Box Law | | |
| 2009 | Crazy Emotion | | |
| 2010 | The Wrath of the Fisherman | | |
| 2010 | Scandal Home | | |
| 2010 | Bulky Visitor | | |
| 2011 | Ah Men 2! | | |
| 2011 | Scandal at Home | | |
| 2011 | Grandpa JP | | |
| 2012 | Capricious Apprentice | | |
| 2015 | Maintenant ou jamais | | |
| 2019 | The Bull | | |
