= Marcelline Aboh =

Beninese actress and comedian

- Born: Marcelline Akinocho; 1940; Porto-Novo, Benin
- Died: 20 August 2017 (aged 76–77); Porto-Novo, Benin
- Other name: Détin Bonsoir
- Occupations: Actress, comedian
- Notable work: Abeni; Abeni 2 Djibiti 1 Djibiti 2

Marcelline Aboh (1940 – 20 August 2017), known by her alias Détin Bonsoir, was a Beninese filmmaker and actress from Porto-Novo. She died of a heart attack after suffering from health problems due to her age.

She was the main comedian of the women-folk comedy group Les échos de la capitale. She first joined them in 1980 after beginning her theatre career in 1958.

She had eight children.
