= Iria del Río =

Spanish actress (born 1987)

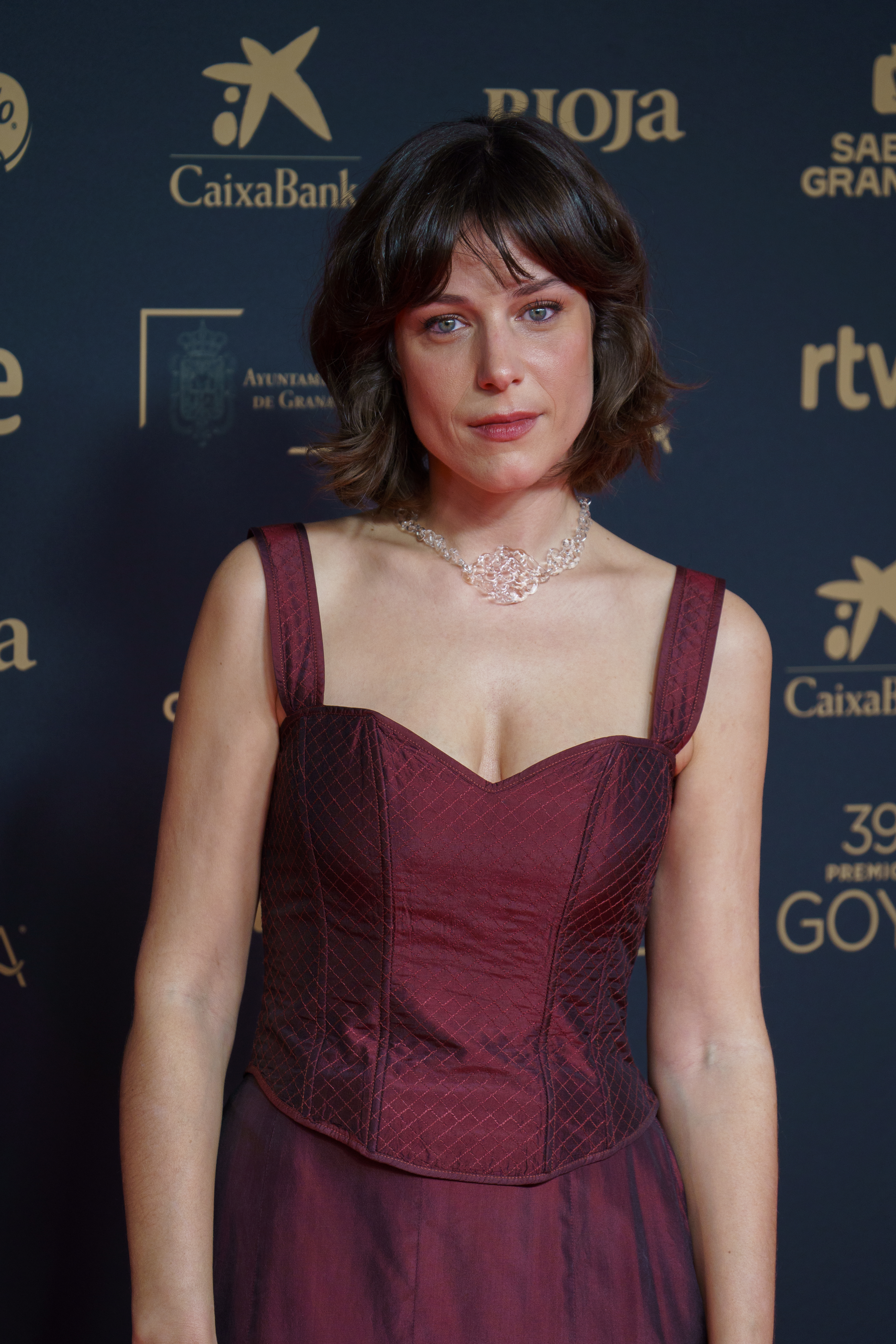
- Del Río in 2025
- Born: 13 January 1987 (age 39); Barcelona, Catalonia, Spain
- Occupation: Actress

Iria del Río (born 13 January 1987) is a Spanish actress.

== Life and career ==
Iria del Río was born on 13 January 1987 in Barcelona. Her mother is from Cobas, Ferrol, Galicia. She trained at the Nancy Tuñón acting atelier. In 2010, she made her television debut in the telenovela Gavilanes. She made her feature film debut in The Misfits Club (2014).

== Filmography ==
=== Film ===
Year	Title	Role	Notes	Ref.
2014	El club de los incomprendidos (The Misfits Club)		Feature film debut	
2019	El increíble finde menguante (The Incredible Shrinking Wknd)	Alba		
2021	Visitant (Visitor)	Marga		
2022	Las niñas de cristal (Dancing on Glass)	Lidia Solís		
2023	Infiesto	Marta Castro		
2023	Amanece	Candela		
2024	Apocalipsis Z: El principio del fin (Apocalypse Z: The Beginning of the End)	Julia		
2026	Mala bèstia			

=== Television ===
Year	Title	Role	Notes	Ref.
2010	Gavilanes		Television debut	
2012	Amar en tiempos revueltos	Estrella Reverte de Muñoz	Introduced in season 7	
2017	Las chicas del cable (Cable Girls)	Carolina		
2019–20	Les de l'hoquei (The Hockey Girls)	Anna		
2020	Antidisturbios (Riot Police)			
2022	Élite (Elite)		Introduced in season 5	
2024	El inmortal (El Inmortal. Gangs of Madrid)	Hurtado	Introduced in season 2	
2024	Los años nuevos (The New Years)	Ana		

== Accolades ==
Year	Award	Category	Work	Result	Ref.
2024	30th Forqué Awards	Best Actress in a Series	The New Years	Nominated	
2025	12th Feroz Awards	Best Main Actress in a Series	The New Years	Nominated	
2025	33rd Actors and Actresses Union Awards	Best Television Actress in a Leading Role	The New Years	Nominated	
