= Laura Galán =

Spanish actress

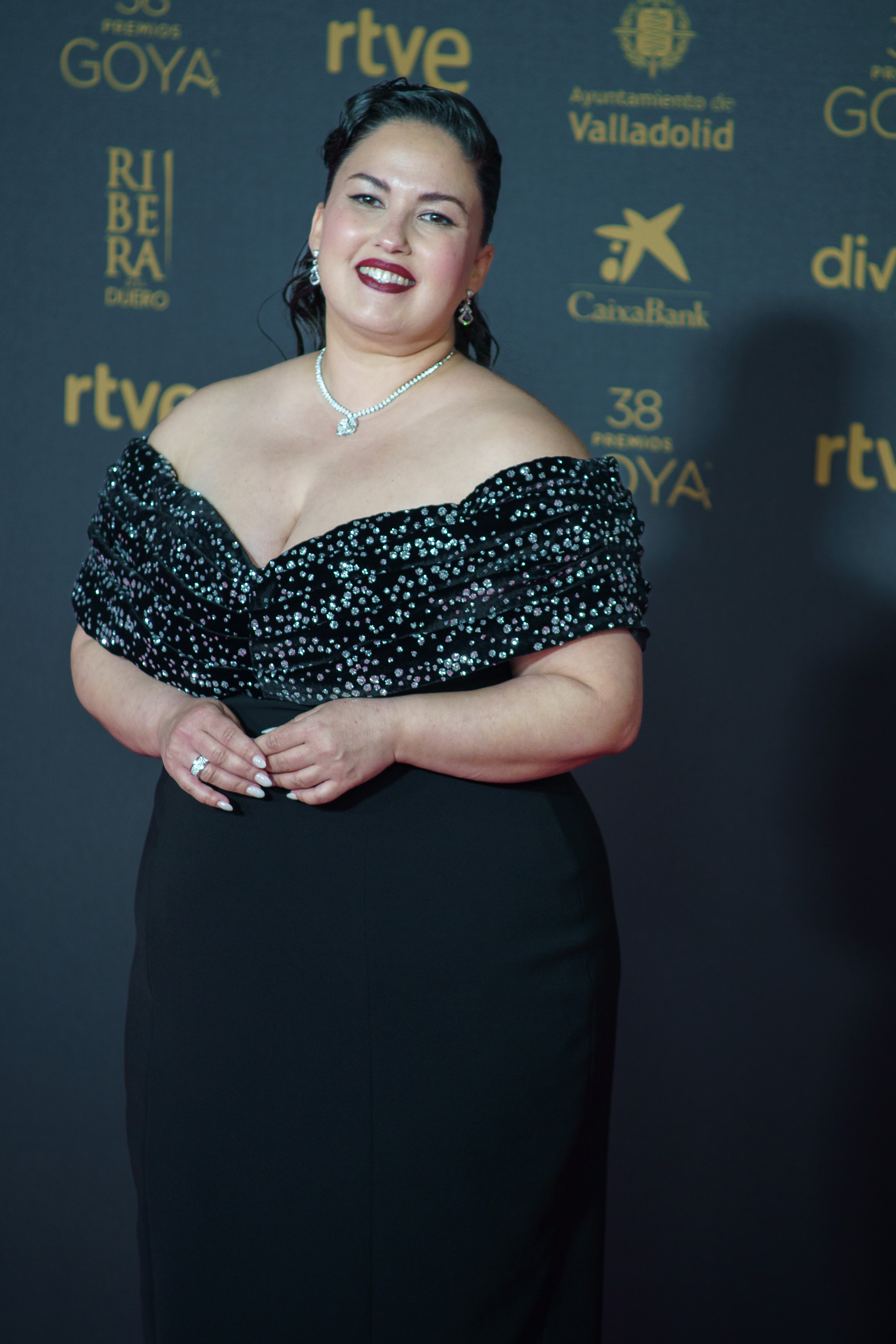
- Galán in 2024
- Born: 1 January 1986 (age 39); Guadalajara, Spain
- Occupation: Actress
- Years active: 2008–present

Laura Galán (born 1 January 1986) is a Spanish actress. She won the Goya Award for Best New Actress for her performance in Piggy (2022).

== Early life and education ==
Galán was born in Guadalajara on 1 January 1986. She dropped her studies on art history to study drama. She earned a diploma in Dramatic Art from the Arte 4 school of Madrid.

== Career ==
Her early career was primarily for the stage, both as an actress and in crew capacities such as assistant director.

She made her feature film debut in The Man Who Killed Don Quixote (2018). She also appeared in Unknown Origins (2020).

Her leading performance portraying Sara in Piggy (2022) earned her a Goya Award for Best New Actress. Another leading role as a street sweeper in revenge one-shot thriller One Night with Adela (2023) ensued. She also joined the cast of historical drama series Beguinas.

== Accolades ==
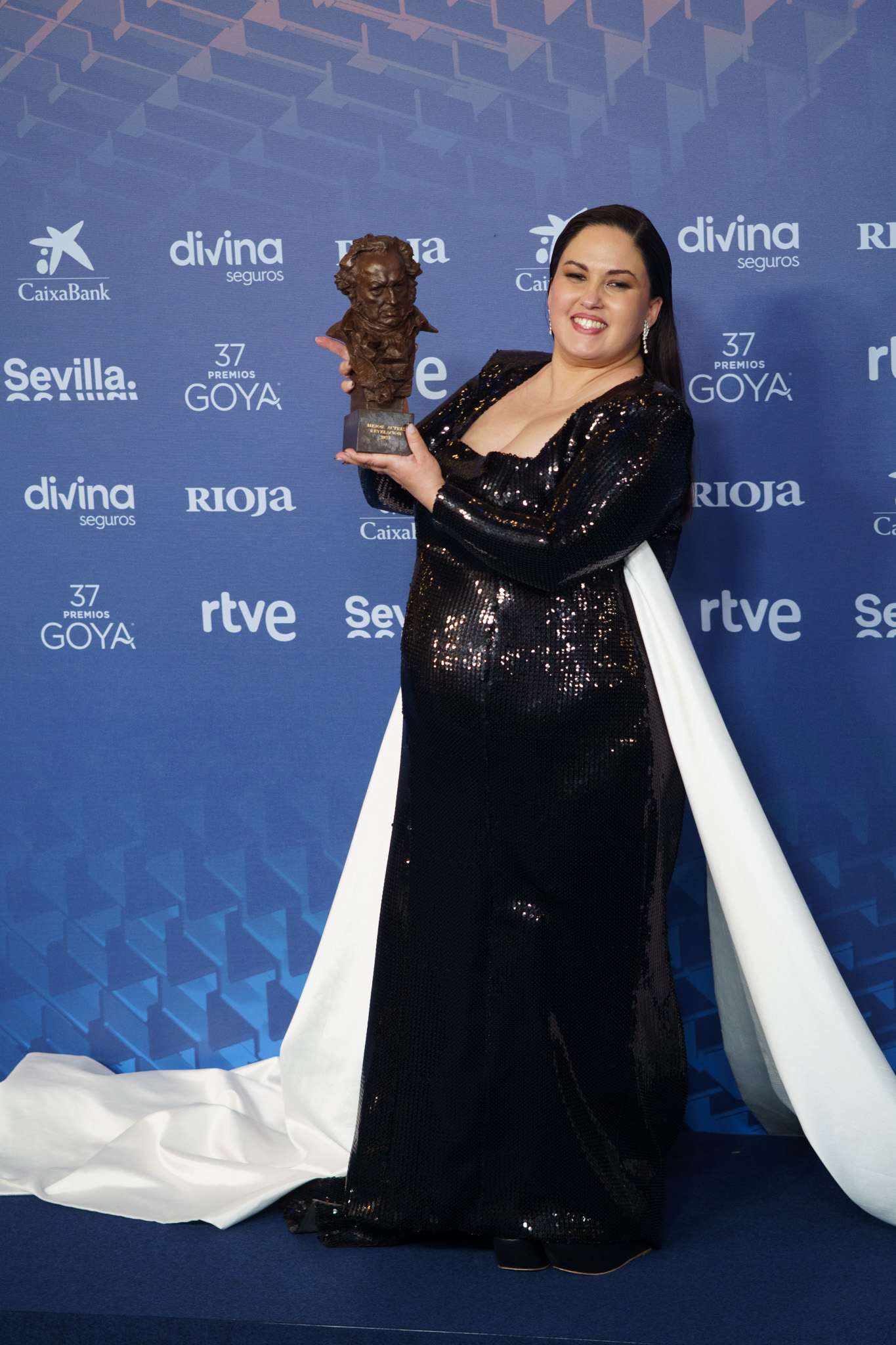
Galán holding her Goya Award for Best New Actress for Piggy at the 37th Goya Awards in 2023

Year	Award	Category	Work	Result	Ref.
2022	28th Forqué Awards	Best Actress	Piggy	Nominated	
2023	10th Feroz Awards	Best Actress	Piggy	Nominated	
2023	78th CEC Medals	Best New Actress	Piggy	Won	
2023	37th Goya Awards	Best New Actress	Piggy	Won	
2023	31st Actors and Actresses Union Awards	Best New Actress	Piggy	Won	
2023	10th Platino Awards	Best Actress	Piggy	Nominated	
2024	32nd Actors and Actresses Union Awards	Best Stage Actress in a Secondary Role	Animales de compañía	Nominated	
