= Kenneth Yannick =

Beninese comedian and actor (born 1995)

- Born: Kenneth Yannick; 30 October 1995 (age 30); Cotonou, Benin
- Education: University of Abomey-Calavi (EPAC)
- Occupations: Comedian, Actor
- Years active: 2008–present

Kenneth Yannick (born 30 October 1995), is a Beninese Stand-up comedian. He is the founder of Cotonou Comedy Club, which is regarded as the first stand-up comedy show in Benin.

== Personal life ==
Yannick was born on 30 October 1995 in Cotonou, Benin where he was raised by mother alone. During his education, he first did fifth grade oriented towards biology because medicine was his priority. However, later he turned to a mathematics oriented path. Then, Yannick spent a year at Polytechnic school of The University of Abomey-Calavi (EPAC) which was catastrophic. He then started making vines in 2013. After his baccalauréat, he completed civil engineering course.

== Humor career ==
In 2008, he discovered the stand-up with the Papa est en haut, a Gad Elmaleh show where he watched it on a computer. In 2013, he started making comedy videos on the Internet and social media. After obtaining a doctorate in physiology, he became a sports teacher, which allows him to earn enough to pay his rent and help his family. Then, between 2015 and 2016, he tentatively tried humor in front of friends at birthday parties.

In 2016, Yannick made his first comedy show in front of an audience of 600 people who did not know stand-up comedy which was held at National Administration and Magistracy School (ENAM). It was the first such stand-up comedy in Benin. Later on 4 August 2017, he created the Cotonou Comedy Club (CCC) along with friends Jean Morel Morufux (Morel) and Fadil Romxi. This is the first time that a show entirely dedicated to stand-up has been offered in Benin.
