= Cadena SER =

Spanish national radio network

- Madrid; Spain
- Broadcast area: Spain and Andorra
- Frequencies: AM: Various; FM: Various

Programming
- Languages: Spanish, Catalan, Galician, Basque
- Format: News, politics, sport

Ownership
- Owner: PRISA Radio (PRISA)
- Sister stations: LOS40; LOS40 Classic; LOS40 Dance; LOS40 Urban; Cadena Dial; Radiolé

History
- First air date: 14 November 1924
- Former call signs: EAJ-1, EAJ-5, EAJ-7, EAJ-9, and others

Technical information
- Transmitter coordinates: 40.4204°N 3.7034°W

Links
- Website: cadenaser.com

La Cadena SER (the SER Network) is a Spanish radio network established in 1924, with a regular listenership of 4,139,000 reported in 2018. The acronym SER stands for Sociedad Española de Radiodifusión (Spanish Broadcasting Company).

Cadena SER broadcasts nationwide, with its main studios located on Gran Vía in Madrid. The network operates studios across Spain, providing local and regional news and information, with each location producing between 2 and 3.5 hours of programming daily.

Owned by Unión Radio, majority controlled by the PRISA group, Cadena SER is affiliated with other media entities including music radio stations such as LOS40, Cadena Dial, Radiolé, and the national daily El País.

== History ==
On 14 November 1924, at 18:30, station EAJ-1 Radio Barcelona initiated regular broadcasts as Spain's first licensed radio station under General Miguel Primo de Rivera government. Seven months later, on June 17, 1925, Unión Radio launched station EAJ-7 Radio Madrid, backed by prominent electrical and broadcasting equipment manufacturers from Spain, Germany, and the United States. By November 10, 1926, this company oversaw Spain's inaugural national radio network, acquiring Radio Barcelona. By 1927, Unión Radio operated Radio Madrid, Radio Barcelona, EAJ-5 Radio Sevilla, EAJ-9 Radio Bilbao, and EAJ-22 Radio Salamanca, enabling simultaneous networked programming, primarily centered on Radio Madrid.

During the monarchy until 1930 and throughout the Second Spanish Republic (1931–1939), Unión Radio served as Spain's sole nationwide radio network, pioneering the country's first national radio news program, La Palabra ("The Word"), broadcast multiple times daily. However, during General Francisco Franco's dictatorship (1939–1977) and the initial stages of Spain's transition to democracy, the network was restricted from airing national news programming, limited instead to twice-daily relays of government-controlled news bulletins by Radio Nacional de España.

On 25 September 1940, ownership of Unión Radio transitioned to the newly formed Sociedad Española de Radiodifusión ("Spanish Broadcasting Company"), which rebranded the network as Cadena SER. In 1975, 25% of the network's shares were nationalized, later being predominantly acquired by the PRISA media conglomerate in 1984. These nationalized shares returned to private ownership under the administration of Felipe González in 1992.

Cadena SER played a pivotal role during Spain's transition to democracy post-Franco and in the lead-up to and aftermath of the adoption of the Spanish Constitution of 1978, particularly notable for its coverage of the attempted coup of 23 February 1981. The network also provided comprehensive reporting on the events surrounding the 2004 Madrid train bombings.

As of 2021, Cadena SER boasted 4,367,000 listeners according to the first wave of the General Media Study (EGM), marking its highest audience since 2017 and significantly surpassing competitors such as Cope and Onda Cero. The network's morning show, Hoy por Hoy, attracted a daily audience of 3,550,000 listeners in 2021.

== Notable programmes ==
Cadena SER features several notable programmes, including:

- Hoy por hoy: A morning broadcast focusing on news and current affairs, first aired on 22 September 1986.
- El Larguero: A late-night sports programme that has been on air since 1989.
- Hablar por hablar: A talk show that debuted in 1989 on Radio Barcelona.
- El Mundo Today: Known for comedy content.
- Carrusel Deportivo: Spain's oldest and longest-running radio programme dedicated to sports, originating in 1952.

== Logos ==
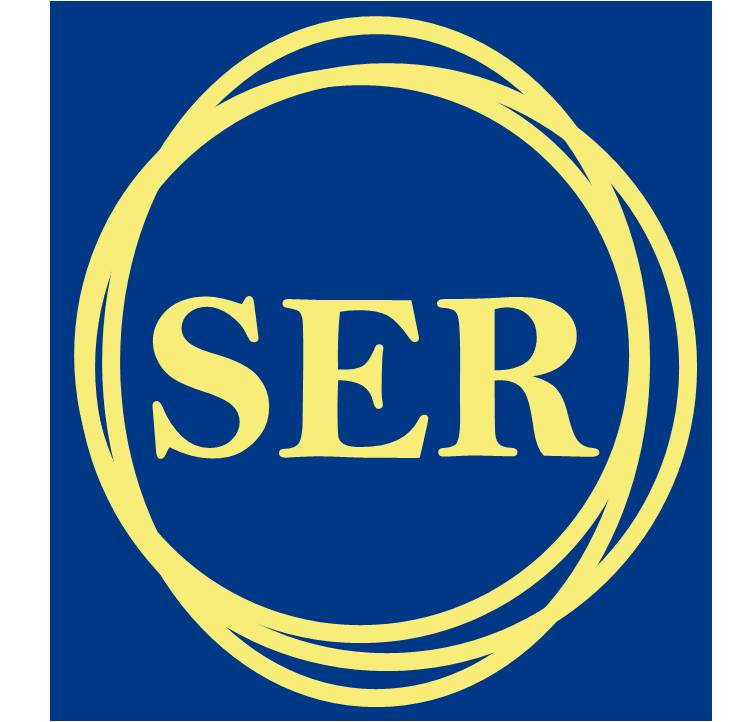
1955–1977

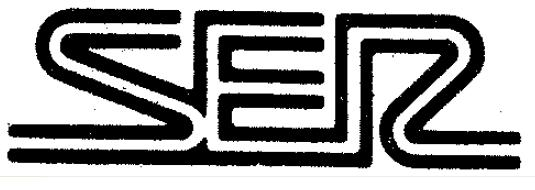
1977–1983

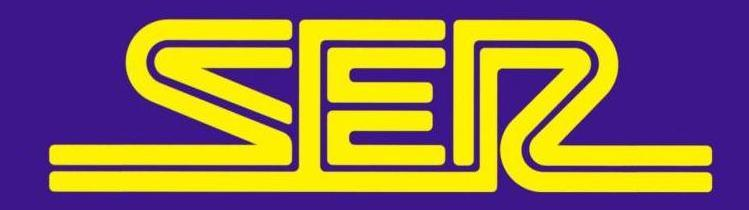
1983–1992

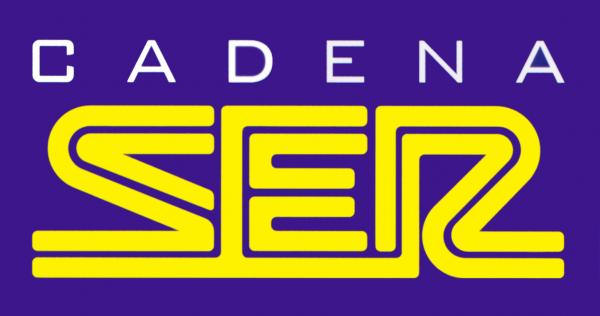
1992–2007

2007–present

== Sources ==
- Carmelo Garitaonaindía; La radio en España (1923–1939), Siglo Veintuno de España, Madrid, 1988. ISBN 84-7585-109-6
- Lorenzo Díaz; La radio en España, 1923–1977, Alianza Editorial, Madrid, 1997. ISBN 84-206-0834-3
