= Magüi Mira =

Spanish actress and theatre director

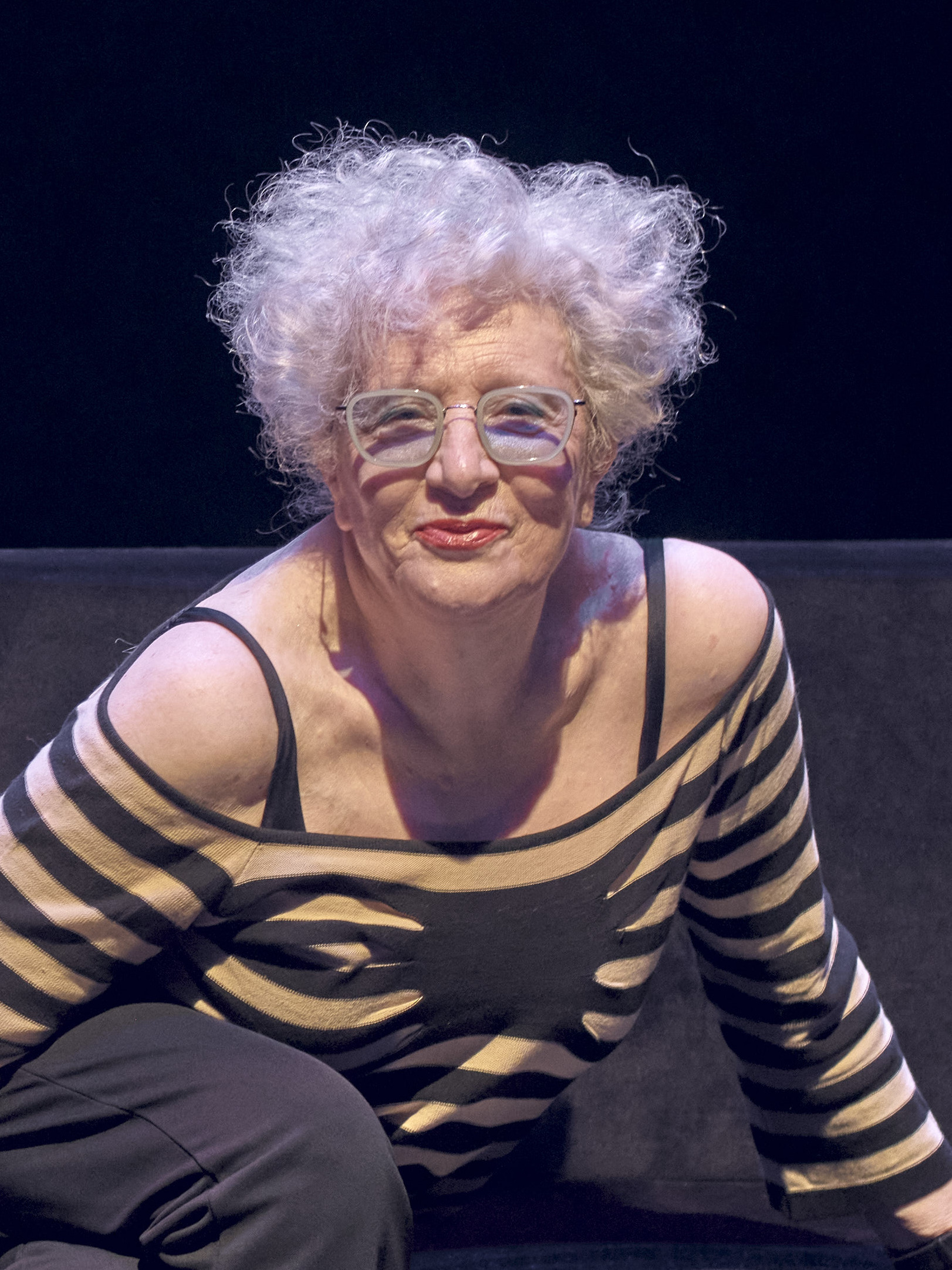
- Born: María Luisa Mira Franco; 1944 (age 81–82); Valencia, Spain
- Occupations: Actress, theatre director

María Luisa Mira Franco (born 1944), better known as Magüi Mira, is a Spanish actress and theatre director. In addition to her stage credits, she has also performed in film and television works.

== Biography ==
María Luisa Mira Franco was born in 1944 in Valencia. Her younger brother Carles was a filmmaker. She studied medieval history in Valencia. In 1967, she moved together with her first husband José Sanchis Sinisterra to Teruel. She moved to Barcelona in 1971, graduating in performing arts from the Institut del Teatre. She earned early recognition in the Spanish theatre scene by playing Molly Bloom in La noche de Molly Bloom, a monologue premiered in 1979 based on the last chapter of Ulysses. After a long acting career in theatre, she made her directorial debut with Top Girls, followed by a staging of The Dog in the Manger in 2002.

In 2016, she was recognised with the Gold Medal of Merit in the Fine Arts.

She is the mother of actress Clara Sanchis and costume designer Helena Sanchis.

In 2026, she was voted as the President of the Academy of Performing Arts of Spain, replacing Cayetana Guillén Cuervo.
