= Bella Agossou =

Beninese actress (born 1981)

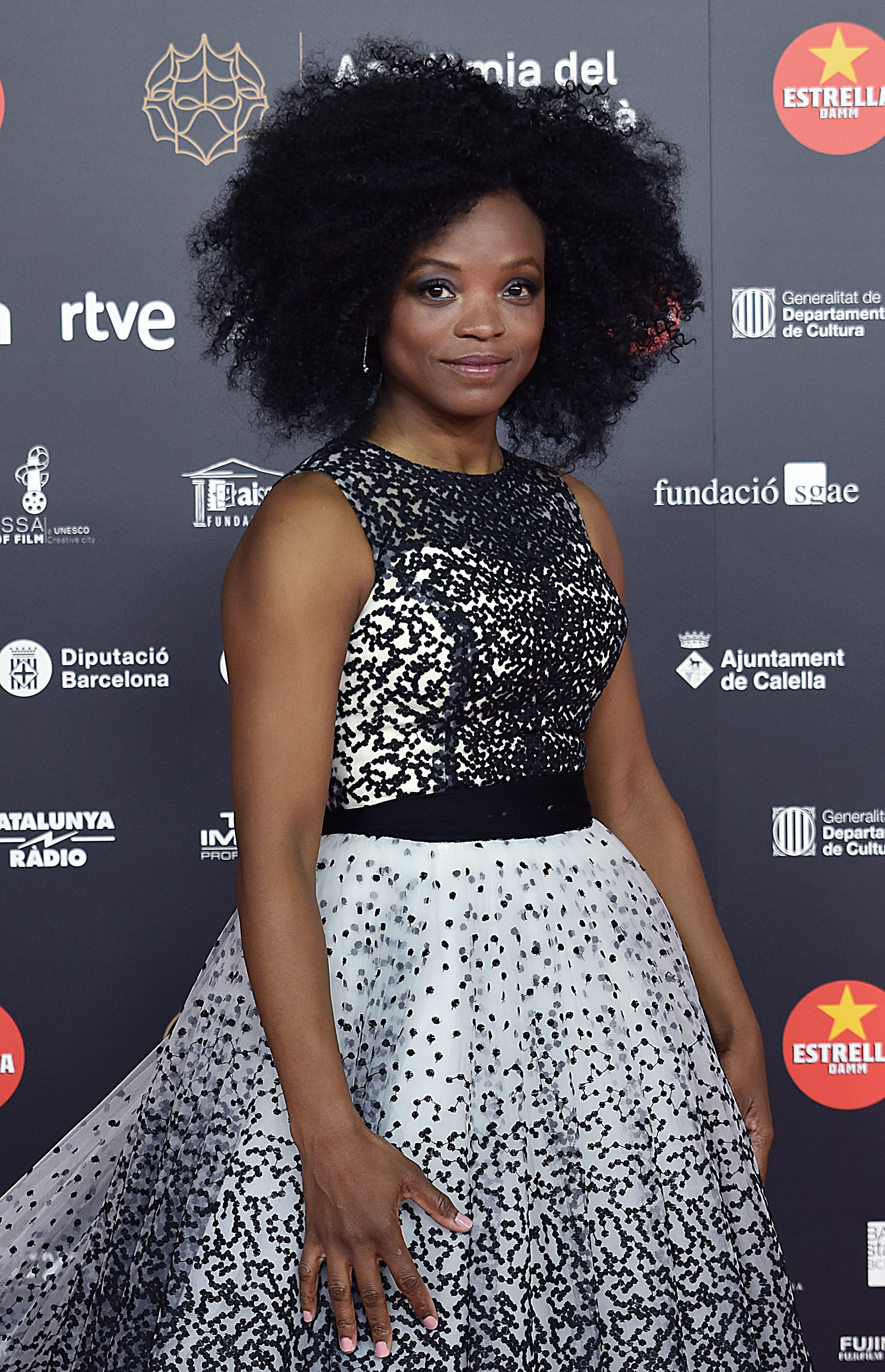
- Born: 1981 (age 43–44); Savalou, Benin
- Occupation: Actress
- Years active: 2002–present

Bella Agossou (born 1981) is a Beninese actress in Spanish cinema.

== Career ==
Agossou began her career in Benin as a theater actress with the company "Sonangnon" created and developed by her. However, after 4 years of creating the company, she moved to Spain in 2002. Then she learned Catalan and Spanish languages to pursue a career as an actress. She acted in the film Un cuento de Navidad (Christmas Tale) with the leading role of a woman wanted by the police for lack of papers as an illegal immigrant.

Later, she played critically acclaimed roles in several African and international films including Los Nuestros, Moranetta, A cuento of Nadal and Palmeras en la Nieve. On 13 July 2017, Agossou presented to the press a shop called "NOK".

== Filmography ==
Year	Film	Roles	Notes	Ref.
2008	El cor de la ciutat			
2009	A cuento of Nadal	Maria	Home movie	
2010	Johan Primero	Doris		
2010	Catalunya über alles!			
2011	Alakrana	Traductora Embajada	mini series	
2011	Catalunya über alles!	Dona cobrador		
2012	Tengo ganas de ti	Boxeadora		
2013	Kubala, Moreno i Manchón			
2013	Un cuento de Navidad		Home movie	
2013	Born			
2014	Palmeras en la nieve	Oba		
2014	Los Nuestros			
2015	Kubala, Moreno i Manchón	Rut	TV series	
2016	The Red Pants			
2017	El Cuaderno de Sara	Masira		
2019	Manual de supervivència	Self	TV documentary	
2020	Caronte		TV series	
2020	Black Beach	Bebe		
2020	Adú	Safí		
2020	Little Birds	Fifi	TV series	
2021	La templanza (The Vineyard)	Trinidad	TV series	
