= Irene Junquera =

Spanish journalist

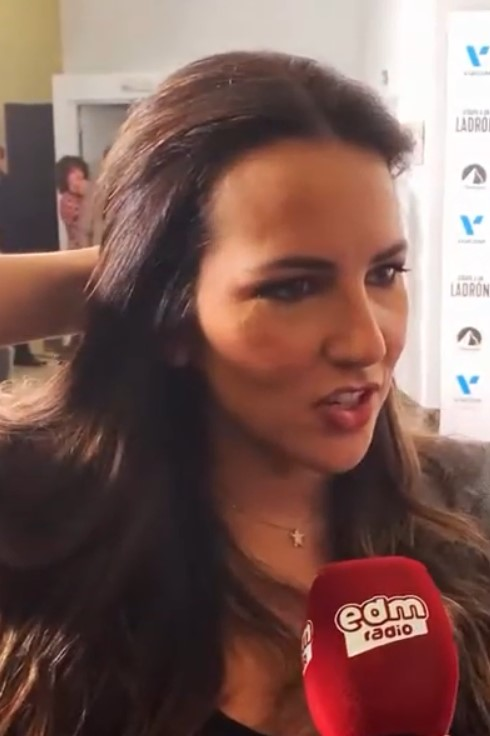
- Born: Irene Junquera Martín; 14 December 1985 (age 40); Madrid, Spain
- Occupation: Journalist
- Employer(s): Intereconomía TV (2008–2013); La Sexta (2015–2017); Mega (2014–2017); Europa FM (2016); Telecinco (2017–present); Gol (2017–present); FDF (2019)
- Television: Punto Pelota (2008–2013); El Chiringuito de Jugones (2014–2017); Zapeando (2015–2017); Vamos tarde (2016–2017); All you need is love... o no (2017); Los lunes al Gol (2017–present); Safari: a la caza de la tele (2019)
- Website: https://irenejunquera.com/

Irene Junquera Martín (Madrid, December 14, 1985) is a Spanish sports journalist and television presenter.

== Career ==
She holds a degree in journalism from the Complutense University. She began her professional career in the sports newsroom of Punto Radio in 2007 to join, a year later, the birth of the program "Punto Pelota" of Intereconomía TV. She collaborates with the newspaper Mundo Deportivo and with the agency Dragoon Sportsbrands 2.0, for which she presents various sporting and advertising events in Madrid.

On September 15, 2008, "Punto Pelota" premiered on Intereconomía TV, a sports talk show broadcast from Monday to Thursday from 00:00 to 1:30. Junquera was part of the program's team of collaborators as "the voice of the viewer", reading opinions on social networks.

After her controversial dismissal from Intereconomía, Josep Pedrerol reached an agreement with Atresmedia to broadcast on the Nitro channel a new sports program with all the collaborators and the same format as "Punto Pelota". The program El Chiringuito de Jugones premiered on January 6, 2014.

Irene Junquera developed the role of "the voice of the viewer" until December 18, 2015, when Pedrerol proposed her as a talk show host, a role she started on January 6, 2016. Her replacement as "the voice of the viewer" was Laura Gadea, who barely a year later was fired and replaced by Sandra Díaz Arcas. In March 2017, she said goodbye to the audience of Chiringuito in a special program, after almost a decade linked to the program's team, ending up leaving it.

From April 2015 to March 2017, Junquera has collaborated in the program Zapeando on La Sexta, hosted by Frank Blanco. From September 20, 2016, to April 2017, she presented, together with Frank Blanco, the radio program "Vamos tarde", on Europa FM. On January 7, 2016, she signed up for the program "Las Mañanas KISS" on Kiss FM, also presented by Frank Blanco.

In March 2017, Irene signed with Mediaset España to co-host "All you need is love.... o no" with Risto Mejide on Telecinco. In February 2019, together with Nacho García, she premieres "Safari: a la caza de la tele" in Factoría de Ficción.

In September 2019, she entered the Gran Hermano VIP house as a contestant of the seventh edition. In the seventh gala she was expelled with 76.2% of the votes.

== Trajectory ==
=== Television programs ===
==== Host ====
===== Entertainment =====
- Adivina Quién on Antena 3 (2007)
- Campanadas Fin de Año on LaSexta (2016–2017)
- All you need is love... o no on Telecinco (2017)
- Safari: a la caza de la tele on FDF (2019)

===== Sports =====
- Punto Pelota on Intereconomía TV (2008–2013)
- El Chiringuito de Jugones on Nitro / La Sexta / Neox / Mega (2014–2017)

=== Contributor ===
==== Entertainment ====
- Guasabi on Cuatro (2015)
- Zapeando on La Sexta (2015–2017)
- Supervivientes: El Debate on Telecinco (2017)
- Amigas y conocidas on La 1 (2018)
- Está pasando on Telemadrid (2019)

==== Sports ====
- Los lunes al Gol on Gol (2017–2018)
- El golazo de Gol on Gol (2018–present)
- El Rondo on Teledeporte (2019–present)
- El desmarque de Cuatro on Cuatro (2020–present)

==== Celebrity ====
- Ninja Warrior (España) on Antena 3 (2017)
- Adivina qué hago esta noche on Cuatro (2019)
- Niquelao! on Netflix (2019)

==== Contestant ====
- Gran Hermano VIP 7 on Telecinco (2019) – 5th expelled
- El cazador on La 1 (2020)

=== Radio programs ===
- No te cortes en Los 40 Principales (2014–2015): contributor.
- Las mañanas Kiss en Kiss FM (2016): co-host
- Vamos tarde en Europa FM (2016–2017): co-host
- Esto no es lo que era en Podimo (2021–present): co-host
- Marca Gaming Show en Radio Marca (2021–present): contributor.
- La Tribu on Radio Marca (2021–present): contributor.
