= Gonzalo Miró =

Spanish television presenter

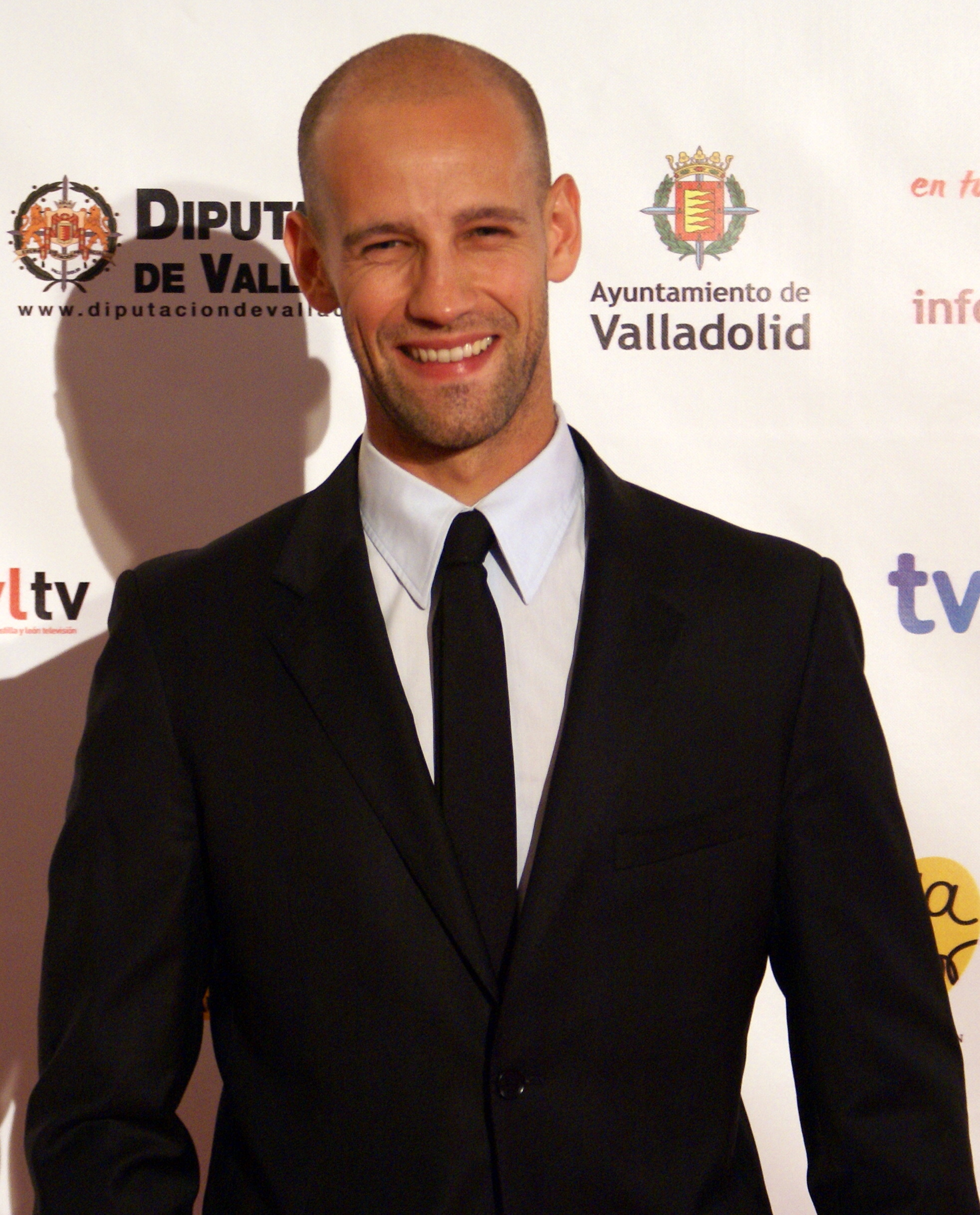
- Born: Gonzalo Werther Miró Romero; 13 February 1981 (age 45); Madrid, Spain
- Occupation: Television presenter
- Years active: 2006 - present
- Spouses: Natalia Verbeke (2003); Eugenia Martínez de Irujo (2005-2009); Amaia Montero (2009-2011); Malú (2014-2017)

Gonzalo Werther Miró Romero (born February 13, 1981, in Madrid) is a Spanish television presenter. He is the son of filmmaker Pilar Miró.

== Biography ==
Gonzalo Miró was the only son of filmmaker Pilar Miró. She had him when she was single and never revealed the identity of his father. His godfather is the former president of the government Felipe González. Her mother died in 1997, when he was 16 years old.

He began his career in Political Science at the Carlos III University of Madrid, which he abandoned to study Journalism at the Francisco de Vitoria University. He later studied filmmaking in New York, which offered him the opportunity to participate in a short film.

Since 2006, he has participated in the morning magazine Las mañanas de Cuatro, alongside Concha García Campoy and other collaborators such as Rosa Villacastín and Spain's Aitor Trigos.

In 2009, Gonzalo left his role as a contributor, and during the 2009/2010 season, he collaborated with Deportes Cuatro.

In September 2010, he started as a commentator in the program Punto Pelota en Intereconomía Televisión. He was a commentator in the program Futboleros on Marca TV.

On March 27, 2014, he joined El chiringuito de Jugones.

On August 25, 2014, he officially joined the program La Goleada on 13 TV.

Since April 2018 he collaborates in the television program of LaSexta Liarla Pardo.

He was romantically involved with Spanish singer Malú which ended in October 2017.

In 2020 he competed in the fifth edition of MasterChef Celebrity.

He is a common guest on television programs appearing as an expert although he has no real personal accomplishments to sustain that.

== Trajectory ==
=== Contributor ===
- Las mañanas de Cuatro on Cuatro (2006 - 2009).
- Punto Pelota on Intereconomía Televisión (2010 - 2012).
- Futboleros on Marca TV (2012 - 2014).
- El Chiringuito de Jugones on Nitro / La Sexta / Neox (2014).
- La goleada on 13TV (2014 - 2015).
- Punto Pelota on Intereconomía Televisión (2015 - 2016).
- Estudio Estadio on Teledeporte (2016 - present).
- Liarla Pardo on LaSexta (2018 - present).
- A partir de hoy on La 1 (2019)
- La prórroga on Gol (2018-2019)
- <i id="mwcw">La mañana</i> on La 1 (2020)
- La hora de La 1 on La 1 (2020 - present)
- El Golazo de Gol on Gol (canal de televisión) (2020 - present)
- Dos parejas y un destino on La 1 (2021)

=== Presenter ===
- Deportes Cuatro on Cuatro (2009 - 2010) Substitute presenter and narrator at games.
- La goleada on 13TV (2014 - 2015)
- Dos parejas y un destino on La1 (2021)

=== Radio ===
- Punto Pelota on Radio Intereconomía (2010 - 2012)
- Radio Marca (2012 - 2016)
- Tiempo de Juego on Cadena Cope (2016 - present)

=== Contestant ===
- MasterChef Celebrity on La 1 (2020)
- Pasapalabra on Antena 3 (2020)
