= Jugones (TV program) =

Spanish television program

- Genre: Football
- Directed by: Josep Pedrerol
- Presented by: Guillermo Moreno
- Country of origin: Spain
- Original language: Spanish

Production
- Production locations: Madrid, Spain
- Editors: Javier Trinidad, Pati Abella
- Running time: 20 minutes
- Production company: Atresmedia

Original release
- Network: LaSexta
- Release: April 1, 2013 – August 21, 2026

Jugones is a Spanish television program that offers information and opinion, presented by Josep Pedrerol, which analyzes current events in the world of soccer and other sports, with special attention to Real Madrid Club de Fútbol and Fútbol Club Barcelona. Opinion, analysis, the most outstanding images of the sport, reports and interviews to the protagonists are other ingredients of the program.

The format, presented by Josep Pedrerol, premiered on April 1, 2013, and is broadcast Monday through Friday from 3:10 pm to 3:30 pm on LaSexta.

== History ==
At the end of March 2013, Atresmedia presented its bid to reinforce the sports information of LaSexta with a new format and, thus, try to stop the most direct competition. Thus, on April 1, Jugones, a sports news program presented by Óscar Rincón and Antonio Esteva, was launched.

Although the program's audience results during its first three and a half months were acceptable, they were still discreet. Thus, the audiovisual group signed Josep Pedrerol as a surprise to take over the program. In addition, the network was interested in finding a female presenter to accompany Pedrerol, and Lara Álvarez was chosen. With this change, Esteva and Rincón would leave the program, although they would continue working in the sports newsroom of LaSexta.

Finally, after some time of preparations, the second season of Jugones arrived on September 16, 2013. At this stage, the program had a new set, new graphics and new collaborators.

On the other hand, a month after Pedrerol and his Punto pelota team were fired from Intereconomía, on January 6, 2014, the sports talk show El chiringuito de Jugones (relocated to LaSexta, Neox and finally Mega in May due to the closure of that channel), which is presented as a 'sister' program to Jugones, premiered on Nitro.

Lara Álvarez left Jugones at the beginning of March 2014 to focus on other projects at LaSexta. Since then, Josep Pedrerol has presented the program alone, with Guillermo Moreno replacing him in his absences.

== See also ==
- El Chiringuito de Jugones
