= Siro López =

Spanish journalist and streamer

- Born: Siro López Fernández; 20 March 1956 (age 69); Sarria, Lugo, Spain
- Occupation(s): Journalist, YouTuber and streamer
- Employers: Cadena COPE; Gol TV; Real Madrid TV; Sport; Teledeporte; YouTube; Twitch

Siro López Fernández (Sarria, Lugo, March 20, 1956) is a Spanish sports journalist, streamer, and YouTuber.

He specializes in basketball and football and is a regular commentator for various national media outlets. He is currently a contributor to Cadena COPE, the newspaper Sport, the program Estudio Estadio on Teledeporte, and El golazo de Gol on Gol TV. In addition, he narrated Real Madrid basketball games on Real Madrid TV and was a contributor to the program "Colgados del Aro," which was part of the YouTube channel "Experience Endesa" and was hosted by Juanma López Iturriaga and Pablo Lolaso. Since 2020, he has been an active streamer on Twitch, and has become one of the most watched sports streamers in Spain. He has participated in several events such as the Padel de las Estrellas (Padel of the Stars). and the Esland Awards.

== Trajectory ==
From the age of ten, he lived with his family in Barcelona, where he studied and graduated in journalism at the Faculty of Information Sciences of Bellaterra of the Autonomous University of Barcelona.

=== Director of Sports at Telemadrid ===
Between 2000 and 2010, he was the sports director of Telemadrid, being, in turn, since 2004, presenter of the sports section of the Telenoticias of the regional channel. Previously, he held different positions in different media and institutions, such as head of press for Real Club Deportivo de La Coruña, editor and basketball narrator for José Mara García's team on Antena 3 Radio, head of sports for La Coruña and Santiago at Onda Cero, and later editor-in-chief of Don Balón and director of the website "Defensacentral.com".

=== TV media talk show host ===
He was one of the founders of Punto pelota, along with Tomás Roncero and José Damián González, who remained from its inception on September 15, 2008, until its extinction on December 4, 2013. On January 6, 2014, he began as a commentator on Josep Pedrerol's new project in Atresmedia, El chiringuito de Jugones.

Shortly after a month, on February 10, 2014, he announced his departure to the other major private television group in the country, Mediaset España, to participate in the talk shows of Pedrerol's rival midnight sports program, "Tiki-Taka" on Energy, and as a contributor to "Deportes Cuatro".

=== Basketball Narrator at Mediaset España ===
One of the reasons for Siro's signing with the Fuencarral group was the possibility of being the main narrator of Spain's matches at the 2014 World Cup, which the national team played as host, and at EuroBasket 2015. He narrated these two championships alongside international basketball specialist Antoni Daimiel and former player José Miguel Antúnez.

=== Presenter of "La Goleada" on 13tv ===
He presented between October 6, 2014 and February 9, 2015, together with Danae Boronat, the midnight sports talk show "La goleada" on channel 13tv, competing in midnight sports on DTT from Sunday to Thursday, with his former colleagues from El chiringuito de Jugones, led by Pedrerol. 13tv cancelled the program in the middle of the season, due to the low ratings it had been registering.

=== Colgados del Aro ===
He collaborated, along with Juanma Iturriaga, Antoni Daimiel, and Pablo Lolaso, in the YouTube/Twitch program Colgados del Aro by Endesa. A program of humor, information, and variety infused with the Endesa League, EuroLeague, and other events in the world of basketball. Numerous personalities, such as Pau and Marc Gasol, Andreu Buenafuente, Ibai, José Manuel Calderón, among others, have participated in the program.

=== Twitch ===
After befriending Ibai thanks to Colgados del Aro, Siro and Pablo Lolaso decided to create their own Twitch channels. In a live program of Colgados del Aro, Siro created himself a Twitch channel and, seeing the great support and encouraged by his son, he was encouraged to broadcast. In barely a year of trajectory, it has become one of the sports journalism referents on this platform. His relevance has permeated his field, and it is common to see him collaborating with other streamers such as Ibai Llanos. He has participated in programs such as Out of the Box, by Outconsumer for Esportmaniacos; he has worked on the Especial Por la Palma with Ibai, in the special of the 2021 transfer market closing, in El Padel de las Estrellas, in the broadcasting of the Ballon d'Or gala; among others.

In 2022, he presented an Esland Award for best esports reporter.

He directs an interview program, Gracias por Venir, in which he chats with all kinds of personalities, for example: José María García, Ibai, Antoni Daimiel, Luzu, Lendoiro; among others.
