= Manu Carreño =

Spanish radio and television presenter

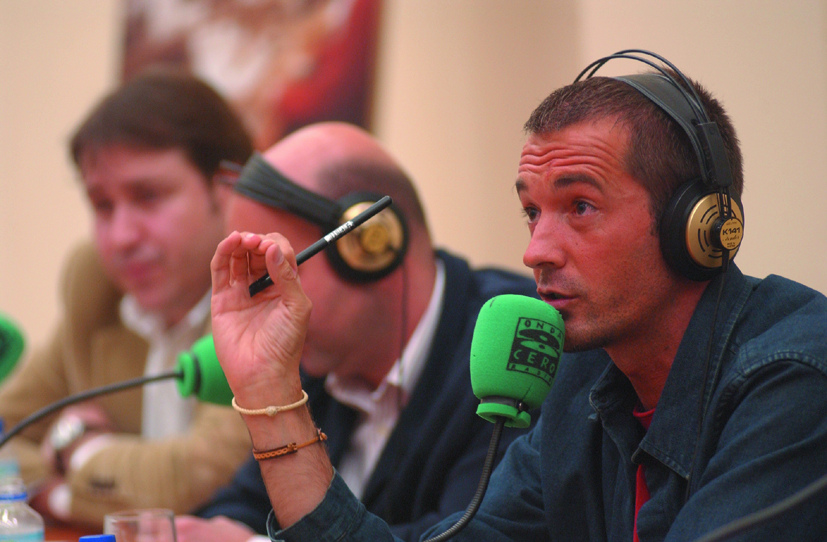

Manuel Bartolomé Carreño Molina (Valladolid, August 6, 1969) is a Spanish radio and television presenter. Since April 2006, he has presented the news sports program of Cuatro, a position in which he has been accompanied by Manolo Lama (between 2006 and 2016, a stage of time in which he was popularly known as Los Manolos) and Nico Abad (since 2016). He is the main narrator of the football matches broadcast by Cuatro and Telecinco. Additionally, on August 21, 2016, he also began directing the stringer in the SER chain, whose other sports program of reference, Carrusel Deportivo, was previously presented (between 2011 and 2014).

He has done analysis and been interviewed.

== Biography ==
=== Beginnings (1994-2001) ===
In 1994 he began to do the program The Countdown on Television Valladolid - Channel 48, which showed the previous sports events of the weekend, to then pass, in 1997, to the sports section of Canal+, where he remains four years and is dedicated to broadcasting football matches of Second Division A, together with Lobo Carrasco.

=== Antena 3 (2001-2003) ===
In 2001 he was hired by Antena 3 to present the contest The record show, with Mónica Martínez and Mar Saura. The program remained until 2002, and after its cancellation, Carreño conducted during that year the entertainment programs Los vigilantes de la tele and El Gran Test, together with Paula Vázquez In September 2002, he also presented the informative Antena 3 Noticias in its midday edition, accompanying veteran Olga Viza.

=== Onda Cero (2003-2004) ===
In September 2003, he decided to leave television on the radio, since the directors of Onda Cero offered to cover the gap that in the sports information caused by the march of José María García. At the first touch, space aired daily from 12:00 to 1:30 in the morning. At the end of the season, in July 2004, and according to the second wave of the year of the General Media Study, its space had reached 248,000 listeners, far from the 1,646,000 of José Ramón de la Morena's stringer (SER chain) and the 489,000 of El Tirachinas by José Antonio Abellán (COPE), the other sports spaces of the remaining chains.

=== Canal+ (2004-2005) ===
It is at that time when Carreño returns to television and again joins Canal+, presenting with Ana García Siñeriz a Lo + plus talk show. It remains in the program until its cancellation in 2005 with the beginning of the broadcasts of Cuatro, the new television network owned by the PRISA Group.

=== Cuatro (2005-2011), merger with Mediaset (2011-present) ===
Since the birth of the chain on November 7, 2005. Carreño is director of the Sports News section Four, information services of the then Sogecable channel. Since April 24, 2006, he presents with the Manolo Lama, the sports news from 3:00 p.m., popularly known as Los Manolos, in reference to the common name of both presenters. After the merger of Cuatro with Telecinco in January 2011, Carreño continues as presenter of Deportes Cuatro, but begins to work in the rest of the channels of the Mediaset España group, such as Telecinco, narrating the UEFA Europa League and matches of the Spanish team or large events like the Eurocopa 2012, World Cup 2014 or Eurocopa 2016. From April 2013 until the end of the 2014/15 season, he narrated in Cuatro with Kiko Narváez and Lobo Carrasco, the open match of each day of the National First Division League Championship. In 2014 he led the analysis space of the League Match to match. Since 2015, he is the narrator of the friendly matches of the national team, the Spanish Super Cup and the Copa del Rey final, after becoming Mediaset with the rights between 2015 and 2018.

=== Cadena SER (2011-2014, 2016 present-) ===
On May 31, 2011 he was introduced as the new director of Sports Carousel, thus becoming the eighth director of the program. He debuted on August 14, 2011 with the Spanish Super Cup match between Real Madrid and FC Barcelona, staying three seasons on air until July 2014. After his time as a spokesman and commentator of the sports programs of the COPE Chain between February 2015 and May 2016. on June 7, 2016, he announced his return to the SER Chain, where, since August 21, 2016, he's directed the radio's nightly sports program, El Larguero, replacing José Ramón de la Morena.

== Awards ==
In 2011, he was awarded the Golden Microphone in the television category, granted by the Federation of Radio and Television Associations in Ponferrada.

== Bibliography ==
- Los Manolos, mano a mano. Editorial Planeta. October 15, 2013. ISBN 978-84-08-12045-2.
