= Punto pelota =

Television program

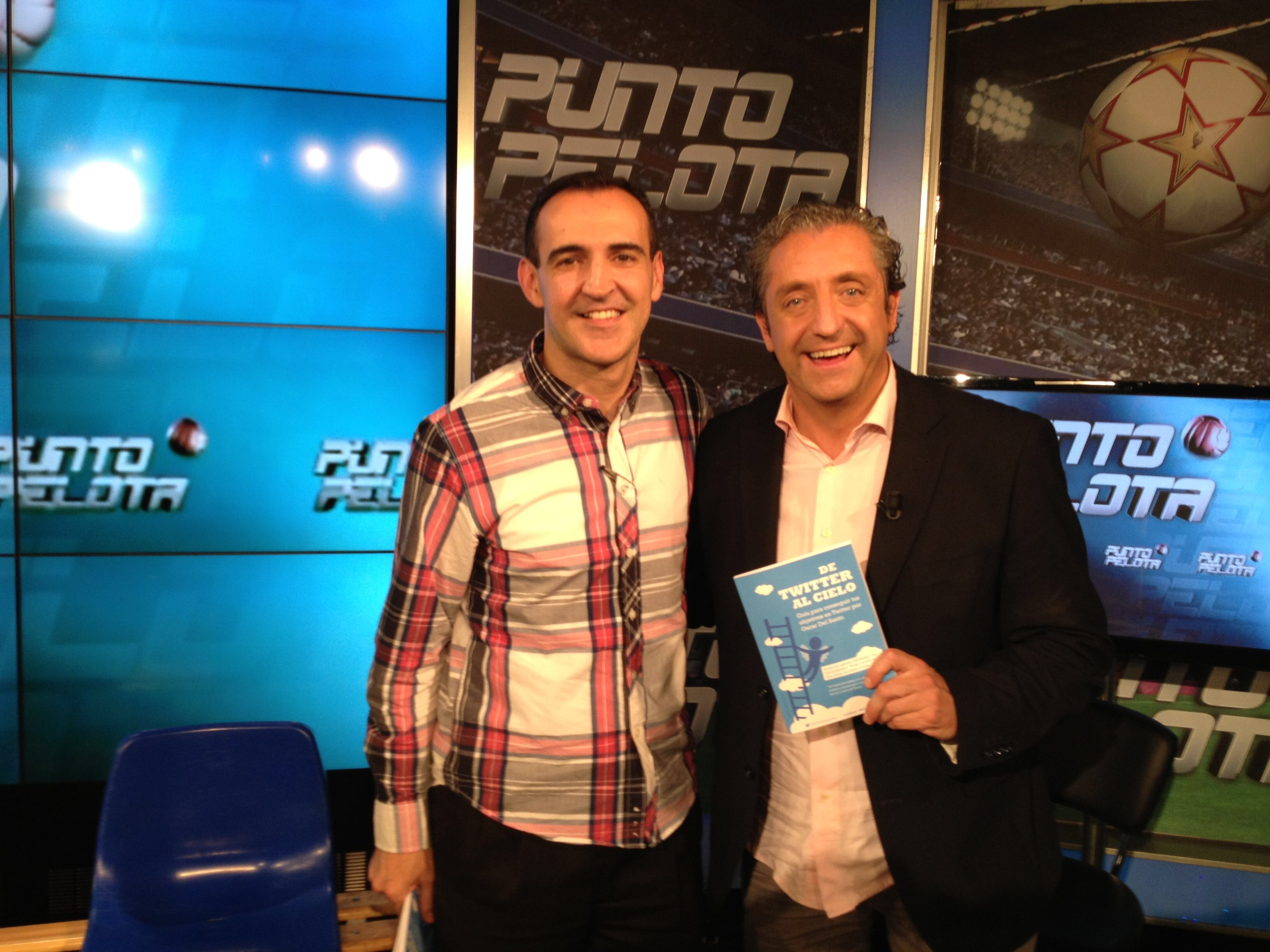
- Oscar Del Santo and Joseph Pedrerol presenting Punto Pelota.
- Genre: Football
- Directed by: Ulises Sánchez-Flor
- Presented by: Josep Pedrerol (2008-2013) Carlos García Hirschfeld (2013) Alonso Caparrós (2014-2017)
- Country of origin: Spain
- Original language: Spanish

Production
- Production locations: Madrid, Spain
- Running time: 75 minutes

Original release
- Network: Intereconomía group
- Release: 15 September 2008 – 2017

Punto pelota was a Spanish sports talk show that was broadcast on Intereconomía TV from Monday to Friday, between 20:45 and 22:00. The program was presented in its last stage by Alonso Caparrós.

In addition, Punto Pelota is also the sports information portal of Intereconomía group. It contains the latest news on LaLiga Santander, broadcasts the best matches live and offers information on the rest of the most popular sports. In May 2014, Intereconomía appointed José Antonio Fúster as the new director of Punto pelota.

== Emission data ==
Punto Pelota was broadcast on Intereconomía Televisión, from Monday to Friday between 20:45 and 22:00.

Punto Pelota was present in both audiovisual media of Intereconomía Corporation, being broadcast on Intereconomía Televisión and Radio Intereconomía from Monday to Thursday between 12:00 and 14:30. During the period presented by Josep Pedrerol, it was also broadcast on Sundays at 11:30 am, starting with a summary of the summaries of the matches corresponding to the LaLiga match day. When there was no LaLiga matchday, the program was not broadcast on Sundays.

On November 29, 2009, the program achieved a Guinness World Record for being on the air for more than 19 hours in a row. On April 10, 2010, it broke his own Guinness World Record for more than 22 hours in a row on the air, dates that coincide with the Clásicos.

== Team ==
Punto Pelota was directed by the well-known sports journalist Josep Pedrerol, who was the director and presenter of the program from September 2008, when he joined Intereconomía after not renewing his contract with Punto Radio, until December 4, 2013, when he was dismissed by Intereconomía's management after a series of disputes due to the debt owed by the television channel to the Catalan presenter, his team and, in general, to practically all the workers of the channel.

Josep Pedrerol had brought with him a variety of collaborators; some had collaborated with him in other media, but others were new faces who had not appeared before.

The format imposed by Pedrerol in the new program attracted numerous personalities from the sports press, present in the most varied media in Spain, who regularly attended the program; Tomás Roncero, José Luís Sánchez, Manu Sáinz, Javier Matallanas, Carmen Colino, Pedro Pablo San Martín, José Antonio Martín Petón and Manuel Esteban Fernández Manolete teamed up with AS newspaper and Cadena SER; Quim Domènech from RAC 1; Telemadrid sports director Siro López; Pipi Estrada from esRadio; Iñaki Cano and Elías Israel from SportYou. es; Julio Pulido and Mónica Marchante from Deportes Cuatro; David Sánchez, Alfredo Duro and Paco García Caridad from Radio MARCA; Miguel García, president of L'Hospitalet; Quique Guasch from TVE; Jorge D'Alessandro, Rafa Almansa and Carles Fité, from Cadena COPE; Frédéric Hermel, collaborator of L'Équipe; François Gallardo, who claims to be a FIFA agent without being one; former professional referee Joaquín Ramos Marcos, also collaborator of Pedrerol in Punto Radio; Rafa Guerrero, former auxiliary referee; former Argentinean goalkeeper of Boca Juniors Hugo Gatti; Roberto Morales, from the EFE Agency, José Antonio Luque and Eva Turégano from Antena 3, former Real Madrid goalkeeper Paco Buyo, former Deportivo de la Coruña striker Albert Luque, former cyclist Óscar Pereiro, former FC Barcelona player Lobo Carrasco, former Valencia CF player Gerard López; tennis player and world number one Carlos Moyá; Antonio Esteva from La Sexta; former Real Madrid players Álvaro Benito, Guti and Fernando Sanz; Víctor Lozano from Onda Cero; Cristina Cubero from Mundo Deportivo, Carme Barceló, José Luis Carazo and Lluís Mascaró from Sport; José Damián González from La Gaceta and Eduardo Inda former director of Diario Marca.

Upon Hirschfeld's arrival, a new cast of talk show hosts was introduced which, according to audience ratings, was not supported by the public. It should be added that in this stage, during the first four programs, there were 4 changes in a row in terms of the presenters who read the comments of the people who participated, among them, Rocio Cano, José Luis Vidal (who also collaborated in El gato al agua), Marta Simonet and Israel Sastre. It is also worth mentioning that they had a section to find a song for the program's guests, in which Fernandisco collaborated on Thursdays.

On December 12, 2013, after the program had finished, Hirschfeld announced that they would be going on Christmas vacation in order to improve various aspects of the program upon their return in January 2014. Ultimately the program was scheduled to return in February 2014, but that return never happened. Finally, almost a year after its last broadcast, Intereconomia finally decided to rebroadcast the program, now under a new format, and at a new time slot. The return of the program finally took place on November 24, 2014, under the presentation of Alonso Caparrós.

The program ended its broadcasts in 2017. Even so, the brand continued on the Internet as a sports content portal and YouTube channel.

=== Host ===
- Alonso Caparrós

=== Tertulians ===
- Kiko Matamoros
- Juan Gato
- Jimmy Giménez-Arnau
- Fernando Ballesteros
- Juan Esteban Rodríguez
- Ilaria Mulinacci
- David Sánchez
- Ulises Sánchez-Flor
- Javier Matallanas
- Joaquín Maroto
- Roberto Palomar
- Roberto Gómez
- Juan Carlos Rivero
- Guillermo Moreno
- Alberto García Caridad
- Juanma Pérez Noya
- José Vicente Hernáez
- Javier Molinero
- José Luis Luna
- Miguel Navarro
- Miguel Ángel Calero
- Ramón Fuentes
- Gonzalo Miró
- Pedro Pablo San Martín
- Carmen Colino
- Rafa Sahuquillo
- Miguel Serrano
- Javier Molinero
- Juan Carlos Velazco
- Raúl Varela
- Ramón Fuentes
- Carlos Carpio
- Rubén Uría
- Ramón Fuentes
- Pedro Riesco

=== Collaborators ===
- María Morán
- Patricia Domínguez
- José Antonio Fúster
- Víctor Collado
- David De las Heras

=== Former collaborators and talk-show hosts ===
- Lobo Carrasco
- Gaby Ruiz
- Julio Pulido
- Elías Israel
- Mateo Fernández
- Luis Villarejo
- José Félix Díaz
- Néstor Susaeta
- Verónica Sanz
- Julián Redondo
- Javier Tena
- Francesco Barbera
- Jaume Creixell
- Javier Hernanz
- Antonio Romero
- Gerard López
- Enrique Marqués
- Víctor Lozano
- Roberto Palomar
- Fernando Sanz
- Eduardo Inda
- Javier Balboa
- Joan Capdevila
- José Antonio Luque
- Albert Luque
- Alfredo Duro
- Álvaro Benito
- Antonio Esteva
- Carlos Moyá
- Carles Fité
- Carme Barceló
- Francisco De Asis Llonch
- Cristina Cubero
- Eva Turégano
- Frédéric Hermel
- Hugo Gatti
- Iñaki Cano
- Jorge D'Alessandro
- José Antonio Martín "Petón"
- José Damián González
- José Luis Carazo
- José Luis Sánchez
- José María Gutiérrez Hernández "Guti"
- Lluís Mascaró
- Manu Sáinz
- Paco Buyo
- Tomás Roncero
- Siro López
- Quim Domènech
- Roberto Morales
- Óscar Pereiro
- Pipi Estrada
- Rafa Almansa
- Manuel Esteban Fernández Manolete
- Paco García Caridad
- Miguel Garcia
- François Gallardo
- Borja Mazarro
- Irene Junquera
- Juan Féliz Sanz "The intern"
- Fran Echeverría
- Diego Plaza
- Nacho García
- Nacho Peña
- Paco Rabadán
- Nacho Tellado "The architect"
- Rafa Guerrero
- Joaquín Ramos Marcos
- Isaac Fouto
- Marta Simonet

=== Special Guests ===
The journalistic genre of the program follows the rules of the talk show: the moderator comments on a central topic and a debate is established among the panelists in which the other related topics of the day are discussed. The program has featured Real Madrid president Florentino Pérez, former Spain national team coach Vicente Del Bosque, former Atlético de Madrid players Paulo Futre and Radamel Falcao, coach David Vidal, Madrid players Gonzalo Higuaín, Sergio Ramos, Karim Benzema, Marcelo Vieira and Cristiano Ronaldo; former Atlético de Madrid striker Diego Forlán, former Sevilla F.C player Álvaro Negredo, C.D. Tenerife goalkeeper Aragoneses, Palencia player Benjamín Zarandona, Alcorcón players Diego Cascón, Fernando Béjar and Borja Gómez, former Espanyol Barcelona and Chelsea player as well as current Celta Vigo player Enrique de Lucas, RCD Mallorca goalkeeper Dudu Aouate, and strikers Antoñito and David Barral.

== Awards ==
In 2012, he was awarded the Golden Microphone in the television category by the Federation of Radio and Television Associations in the city of Ponferrada.

== Record ==
Punto Pelota set the record for the longest broadcast of a sports program. It was broadcast 19 hours in a row, the 19 hours prior to the Barcelona - Real Madrid match. The marathon started at 12:00 and ended at 19:00. After the match, Punto Pelota resumed broadcasting, so although the record is 19 hours, the program is considered to have lasted 23 hours.

This marathon was attended by countless journalists and guests. With this marathon they also achieved the audience record of the program and of the Intereconomía network.

On April 10, as a consequence of the Clásico between Real Madrid and FC Barcelona Punto Pelota set a new record by broadcasting for 24 hours and talking about it.

On November 29, 2010 and April 16, 2011, for the two classics of the 2010/2011 season, there was a deployment of 5 and 6 hours respectively before the match and 2.5 hours after the end of the match.

On December 10, 2011, also as a consequence of the Clasico between Real Madrid and FC Barcelona, Punto Pelota equaled its own record by broadcasting for 24 hours and talking about it.

Its second best audience share was 327,000 viewers and a 5.5% audience share, after FC Barcelona's elimination against Inter Milan.

Its record audience with a 6.1% audience share was following the first leg of the Champions League semifinals in which Real Madrid lost to FC Barcelona by 0-2.
