= El Chiringuito de Jugones =

Television program

- Also known as: El chiringuito de Jugones (2014-2026)
- Genre: Football
- Created by: Josep Pedrerol
- Developed by: Soleiman Bakkali
- Directed by: Josep Pedrerol
- Presented by: Josep Pedrerol
- Opening theme: Vive deportivamente
- Ending theme: No sería fácil
- Country of origin: Spain
- Original language: Spanish
- No. of seasons: 15
- No. of episodes: 2,939

Production
- Executive producers: Javi de la Peña; David Martínez; Virginia Fernández
- Production locations: Madrid, Spain
- Editor: Gonzalo de Martorell
- Running time: 170 minutes
- Production companies: Atresmedia (2014-2026); Mediaset España (2026-present)

Original release
- Network: Mega, LaSexta (special programs)
- Release: January 6, 2014 – July 20, 2026
- Network: Cuatro, Energy
- Release: 17 August 2026 – present

El chiringuito (English: The Beach Bar) is a Spanish television program of football debate in which the current affairs of the main teams of the Spanish league are discussed, essentially FC Barcelona and Real Madrid CF. To a lesser extent, other teams such as Atlético de Madrid, Sevilla FC, Valencia CF or Athletic Club de Bilbao, among others, are discussed. In addition, international football and, occasionally, Spanish futsal and basketball are also discussed.

The program is broadcast from Sunday to Thursday from 00:00 to 02:45 on Mega, a channel belonging to the Atresmedia group, except for some specials such as the death of Diego Maradona or the departure of Lionel Messi which were broadcast on LaSexta. It's presented by Josep Pedrerol, and accompanied by a group of commentators. The program is rebroadcast daily from 06:20 to 09:00 on Mega.

== History ==
El chiringuito is directed by sports journalist Josep Pedrerol, following the same format, technical team and collaborators of the program Punto pelota, which he presented at Intereconomía.

Thus, Pedrerol reached an agreement with Atresmedia, on December 20, 2013 to begin broadcasting the program on January 6, 2014. In addition, it was confirmed that the program would be broadcast through Nitro and would be called El chiringuito de Jugones, thus boosting the brand of La Sexta s sports program called Jugones, becoming the most watched program in the late night slot on DTT channels, as well as the leading program on Nitro, having doubled the channel's audience share since its premiere.

On May 5, 2014, due to the closure of the Nitro channel, the program went on air through La Sexta, taking advantage of the start of the 2014 World Cup, so it changed its name to El chiringuito del mundial. In its beginnings on La Sexta it was broadcast after En el Aire around 1:30 and sometimes even at 2:00, under the name Chiringuito after hours.

After the end of the World Cup and in view of the 2014-2015 television season, El Chiringuito de Jugones changed channels again, recovering its original name. Thus, Neox broadcast the program between August 18, 2014 and July 9, 2015.

However, after the creation of Atresmedia's Mega channel, aimed at the same audience (mainly male) as the first channel where the program was broadcast (Nitro), El chiringuito de Jugones moved its broadcasts to this channel on August 10, 2015. In the early hours of June 8, 2018, the program celebrated its 1,000th broadcast, gathering the entire team on the set.

Since February 9, 2020, the program has been broadcast on Multimedios Televisión in México. In 2021, Fox Deportes in the United States began broadcasting the program live at 7:00 Eastern Time in North America, as it airs in España on Mega. In 2025, SportyNet signed to broadcast the show in Brazil. The program is also rebroadcast in radio format on a number of Spanish local radio stations. It is also rebroadcast daily from 6:20 a.m. to 9:00 a.m. in Spain on Mega.

After thirteen years on the air and 2,938 episodes, the football talk show came to an end on July 20, 2026, after Josep Pedrerol did not renew his contract with Atresmedia. The format concluded with a discussion of the Spanish men's national football team's victory in the 2026 FIFA World Cup. The following day, it was announced that the program and its entire team would move to Mediaset España, where it would be renamed El Chiringuito and would air from August 17, 2026, on Energy and Cuatro.

== Criticisms and controversies ==
The program has been criticized, even by the program's own hosts, for being a madridist program, manipulative and having "turned more into an attack of harassment and demolition of Barça", being described by José Mara Garca as "a filth", and "the worst space in all of journalism", even being referenced, for its style, as the "Sálvame del fútbol" or the "Sálvame del deporte."

=== Reality TV ===
The program has been the protagonist of episodes close to reality show, where there have been resignations of live talk show hosts; physical aggressions; death threats; abandonment of the live set due to anger; live reality TV broadcasts; personal sexist attacks; confrontations between talk show hosts or anxiety attacks broadcast live.

Some of these situations have already occurred in Punto pelota, where confessions about private matters not related to sports; physical aggression; abandonment of the set during live broadcasts; personal macho attacks; and emotional reconciliations among the panelists were heard.

=== Extrasports controversies ===
El Chiringuito talk show hosts Edu Aguirre and Pipi Estrada were accused on social networks of bringing drugs to the set of the program, consuming illegal substances during the broadcast or appearing on the program under the effects of narcotic substances when during the live broadcast of the program they were seen to drop papers from their pockets to the floor of the television set. Both journalists denied these accusations, answering that they were tissues. In addition, Edu Aguirre added that he will take legal action against the people who have accused him of carrying narcotic substances.

In May 2020, another one of the talk show hosts, Edwin Congo, was arrested in a police operation related to drug trafficking and released after being questioned.

François Gallardo, a talk show host, was arrested on charges of alleged fraud for impersonating a FIFA agent and subsequently sentenced to two years in prison.

== Format ==
The program starts around midnight with a short editorial commentary by Josep Pedrerol, detailing the contents of the program of the day; Sandra Daz Arcas, who is the voice of the viewer, encourages audience participation through Twitter, reading comments from the program's followers. Next, the team of commentators who will be present that night are introduced, and as they enter the set, the tune "Vive deportivamente," from Los 2 Españoles, starts to play.

During the program, the different panelists comment and give their opinions on the different topics proposed, all set to background music that guides the viewer in the direction of the debate. In addition, the talk show is complemented with speeches and emotional reflections in the close-up by some of the panelists, reports, interviews, summaries of the meetings, "exclusives," social networks, and sometimes live musical performances by artists little known to the general public.

The program ends with Fernando Fu's "No sería fácil" in the background, giving way to the credits and the departure of the collaborators from the set.

== Broadcast ==
The first season was broadcast on Nitro, from January 6, 2014, to May 1, 2014. The second season was broadcast on La Sexta from May 5, 2014, to July 17, 2014. The third season was broadcast on Neox between August 18, 2014, and July 9, 2015. Finally, the program has been broadcast on Mega since its fourth season, which premiered on August 10, 2015.

Although the format is usually broadcast from Sunday to Thursday between 00:00 and 02:45, previously, with its transfer from Nitro to La Sexta, the space had timetable fluctuations, starting to be broadcast some days at its usual time, other days at 01:30. There were even broadcasts that began at 02:00, finishing at the same time.

On occasions, El Chiringuito has not hesitated to bring its schedule to prime-time, due to important events. They also make live broadcasts in matches of great relevance, such as El Clasico or Champions League qualifiers, although occasionally they have also broadcast live in less relevant matches, such as Real Valladolid-Real Madrid which ended 1-4 in favor of Madrid. When Real Madrid won the tenth UEFA Champions League in 2014, the program started at 00:00 and ended at 06:30. In 2016, when Real Madrid won the UEFA Champions League for the eleventh time, the program began broadcasting at 00:30 and ended at 08:00. In 2017 and 2018, with the UEFA Champions League finals in the background, the program, apart from broadcasting previous UEFA Champions League finals won by Real Madrid, had special evening broadcasts. On the occasion of the Ballon d'Or election, the program broadcasts a special edition, which includes the gala broadcast. Special programs were broadcast for all Spanish derbies and Madrid derbies. There were also special World Cup programs, such as Spain-Russia, in which "la Roja" was eliminated after losing in a penalty shootout. On October 17, 2019, the program was broadcast from Málaga.

Pier Cherubino, Julen Lopetegui, Santiago Solari, Álvaro Arbeloa, Paco Jémez, Florentino Pérez, Hugo Sánchez, among others, have been invited to participate in the program.

== Current team ==
Presenter

- Josep Pedrerol
- Quim Domènech (sporadic substitute) Deputy Director
- Juanfe Sanz (sporadic substitute)
- Edu Aguirre (summer substitute)
- Álex Silvestre (summer substitute)

Viewer's voice

- Ana Garcés (2022–present)

Tertulians

- Alfredo Duro (Marca)
- Álvaro Ruiz (Businessman, Fernando Hierro's son)
- Carme Barceló (Sport)
- Carmen Colino (As)
- Cristina Cubero (Mundo Deportivo)
- Cristóbal Soria (Former field delegate of Sevilla Fútbol Club)
- Eduardo Inda (Okdiario)
- Edu Velasco (Bilbao Sport)
- Fran Garrido (Coach)
- Fernando Sanz (Former player)
- (Guinea) Florentin and Mathias Pogba (Footballers, Paul Pogba's brothers)
- Iñaki Cano (SportYou.es)
- Jaime Astrain (Former player)
- Javier Balboa (Former player)
- Jesús Capitán "Capi" (Former player)
- (Argentina) Jorge D'Alessandro (Former player and coach)
- José Antonio Martín «Petón» (COPE)
- José Damián González (As, Diario 16, El País)
- José Félix Díaz (Marca)
- José Luis Sánchez (Jugones)
- José María Gutiérrez Hernández "Guti" (Former player)
- Jota Jordi (FIFA Agent)
- Juanma Rodríguez (EsRadio)
- Kike Mateu (Cadena SER)
- Lobo Carrasco (Former player)
- (Argentina) Loco Gatti (Former player)
- Luis Villarejo (Agencia EFE)
- Manu Sainz (As)
- (Argentina) Matías Palacios (Footters reporter)
- Miguel Torres (Former player)
- Óscar Pereiro (Ex-cyclist)
- Paco Buyo (Former player)
- Paco García Caridad (Marca)
- Pipi Estrada (#Vamos)
- Quim Domènech (Journalist)
- Quique de Lucas (Former player)
- Rafa Almansa (COPE)
- Rafa Guerrero (Former Assistant)
- Roberto Morales (Agencia EFE)
- Rocío Martínez (Antena 3)
- Tomás Roncero (As)

Editors

- Álex Silvestre
- Arnau Montserrat "Muntsa"
- José Luis "Chechu" Párraga
- Christian Blasco
- Diego Plaza
- Edu Aguirre
- Gonzalo Martorell
- Gonzalo Tortosa
- Gorka Grande
- Iñaki Villalón de Linós
- José Álvarez
- José A. Chozas
- Juanfe Sanz
- Marc Núñez
- Marcos Benito
- Marcos de Vicente
- Nico Rodríguez
- Rafa Acevedo
- Ricardo "Richi" Burgos

Correspondents

- Edu Velasco Jr. (Bilbao)
- Germán Muñoz (Valencia)
- Gonzalo Tortosa (Sevilla)
- José Álvarez (Barcelona and Manchester)
- Marc Núñez (Barcelona)
- Marcos de Vicente (Madrid)

== Former team ==
Viewer's voice

- Irene Junquera (2014-2016)
- Laura Gadea (2016-2017)
- Sandra Díaz Arcas (2017-2022)

Tertulians

- (Venezuela) Jeinny Lizarazo (2014)
- Antonio Esteva (2014)
- Siro López (2014)
- (Chile) Francesco Barberá (2014)
- (Argentina) Lionel Scaloni (2014)
- Joaquín Ramos Marcos (2014-2015)
- François Gallardo (2014-2015)
- Enric Masip (2014-2015)
- Albert Luque (2014-2015)
- Lluís Mascaró (2014-2015)
- José Luis Carazo (2014-2015)
- (France) Frédéric Hermel (2014-2018)
- Álvaro Benito (2014-2018)
- Carles Fité (COPE)
- (Colombia) Edwin Congo (Former player)
- Jorge Calabrés (El Español)
- Pol Tenorio (Real Madrid TV)
- Antonio Oliver (Palabra de fútbol)
- Marta Riesco
- Miguel García
- Álvaro Arbeloa
- (Netherlands) Royston Drenthe (Former player)

Editors

- Nacho Peña (2014-2017)
- Nacho Tellado (2014-2018)
- Borja Mazarro (2014-2021)
- Darío Montero (2021-2023)
- Fermín Canas
- Manolo Salvanés
- Borja Velasco

Correspondents

- Maty Fenoy
- Rocío Arauz
- Leticia Benito
- Leticia García
- Elisa Lasso
- Andrea Borreguero
- Patricia Cotón

Publishers

- Miki Chaves
- Ignacio Miguélez
- Ricardo Burgos

== Hearings ==
Channel	Season	Episodes	Premiere	Final	Audiences	
Channel	Season	Episodes	Premiere	Final	Spectators	Share
Nitro	1st	68	January 6, 2014	May 5, 2014	199.000	3,3%
LaSexta	2nd	47	May 5, 2014	July 17, 2014	330.000	7,2%
Neox	3rd	235	August 18, 2014	July 9, 2015	256.000	4,4%
Mega	4th	234	August 10, 2015	July 7, 2016	233.000	4,2%
Mega	5th	234	August 15, 2016	July 6, 2017	238.000	4,4%
Mega	6th	235	August 7, 2017	July 17, 2018	246.000	4,5%
Mega	7th	234	August 12, 2018	July 4, 2019	224.000	4,3%
Mega	8th	235	August 12, 2019	September 10, 2020	200.000	4,3%
Mega/LaSexta (2 programs)	9th	234	September 13, 2020	August 12, 2021	234.000	4,9%
Mega/LaSexta	10th		August 16, 2021	July 7, 2022		
Mega	11th		August 8, 2022	2023		
Mega	12th		August 2023	2024		
Mega	13th		August 2024	2025		
Mega	14th		August 2025	July 20, 2026		
Cuatro/Energy	15th		August 2026	2027		
