= Ramón Álvarez =

Ramón Álvarez may refer to:

- Ramón Álvarez Valdés (1866–1936), Spanish politician and lawyer
- Ramón Álvarez Palomo (1913–2003), Asturian anarcho-syndicalist
- Ramón Álvarez Jabalquinto (fl. 1930s), Chilean politician
- Ramón Álvarez de Mon (born 1984), Spanish sports broadcaster
- Ramón Álvarez (boxer) (born 1986), Mexican boxer
- Ramón Álvarez (wrestler), Dominican wrestler
