= Juanma Rodríguez =

Spanish journalist

- Born: Juan Manuel Rodríguez Cortés; 18 December 1962 (age 63); Madrid, Spain
- Occupation: Journalist
- Employers: esRadio; Libertad Digital; Mega

Juanma Rodríguez Cortés (Madrid, December 18, 1962), is a sports journalist.

Rodríguez worked for radio stations such as Radio 16 or Radio España and for headers such as El Independiente or the Madrid edition of El Mundo Deportivo. He collaborated with Fax Press, a news agency directed by Manu Leguineche, and was editor-in-chief of Goles, broadcast on Canal 7 Televisión. He currently collaborates as a talk show host on the program El chiringuito de Jugones, as an editor for Marca and Libertad Digital, and as a broadcaster for esRadio.

== Career ==
=== COPE ===
In August 2000, he joined COPE, where he held the positions of editor-in-chief and sports coordinator in Madrid, as well as the direction of Los deportes a la palestra in the same community. He was also a regular commentator on José Antonio Abellán's sports program, "El tirachinas," and was a professor of sports radio in the Master's program of Cadena COPE. In 2004, he received the Antena de Plata awarded annually by the Radio and Press Association of Madrid, and in 2015 he received the Freedom of Journalism Award. In 2017, he received his second Antena de Plata.

In October 2010, after the incorporation of a new sports team led by Paco González, he became director of the weekend news services at the Episcopal radio statio. In 2012, journalist Ángel Rubio replaced him in the position, becoming deputy director of the weekend news services. In February 2015, after fifteen years at the episcopal channel, he was dismissed along with 20 other workers.

=== esRadio ===
For the 2015-2016 radio season, he signed up for the radio station esRadio, belonging to the multimedia group Libertad Digital, of which he was already a contributor with the blog "El penltimo raulista vivo," premiering the new midnight sports program, "El Primer Palo." It premiered on August 31, 2015 and is broadcast from Monday to Friday from 23:00 to 00:30. He also collaborates with the Real Madrid TV channel and Marca newspaper.

=== Chiringuito de Jugones ===
On television, after his time on other sports talk shows, in which he stood out as one of the most mediatic commentators, he debuted on December 3, 2015 in El chiringuito de Jugones, broadcast from Sunday to Thursday on Mega.

== Publications ==
- Rodríguez Cortés, Juanma (2013). Fenómeno Mou: dos visiones opuestas del técnico portugués. Ediciones Pàmies. ISBN 9788415433224.
- Rodríguez Cortés, Juanma (2013). Quédate en el ring. Ediciones Pàmies. ISBN 9788415433354.
