= 2027 Madrilenian regional election =

Election in the Spanish region of Madrid

- 23 May 2027

All 143 seats in the Assembly of Madrid 72 seats needed for a majority
- Opinion polls
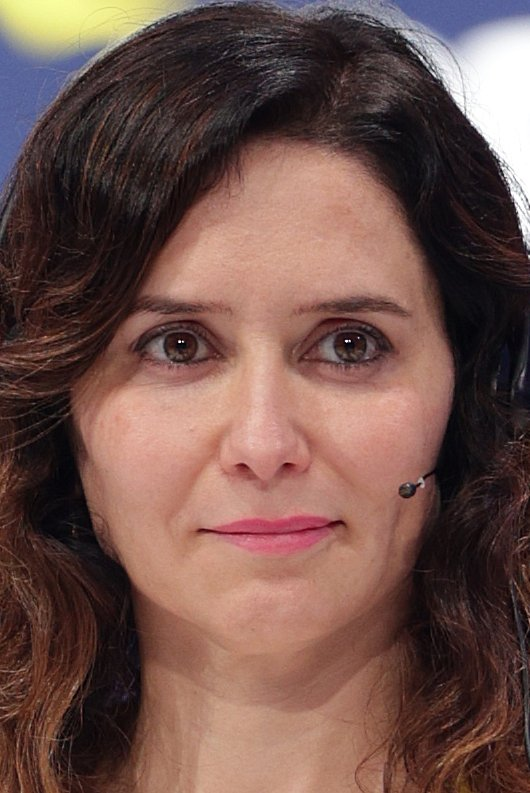

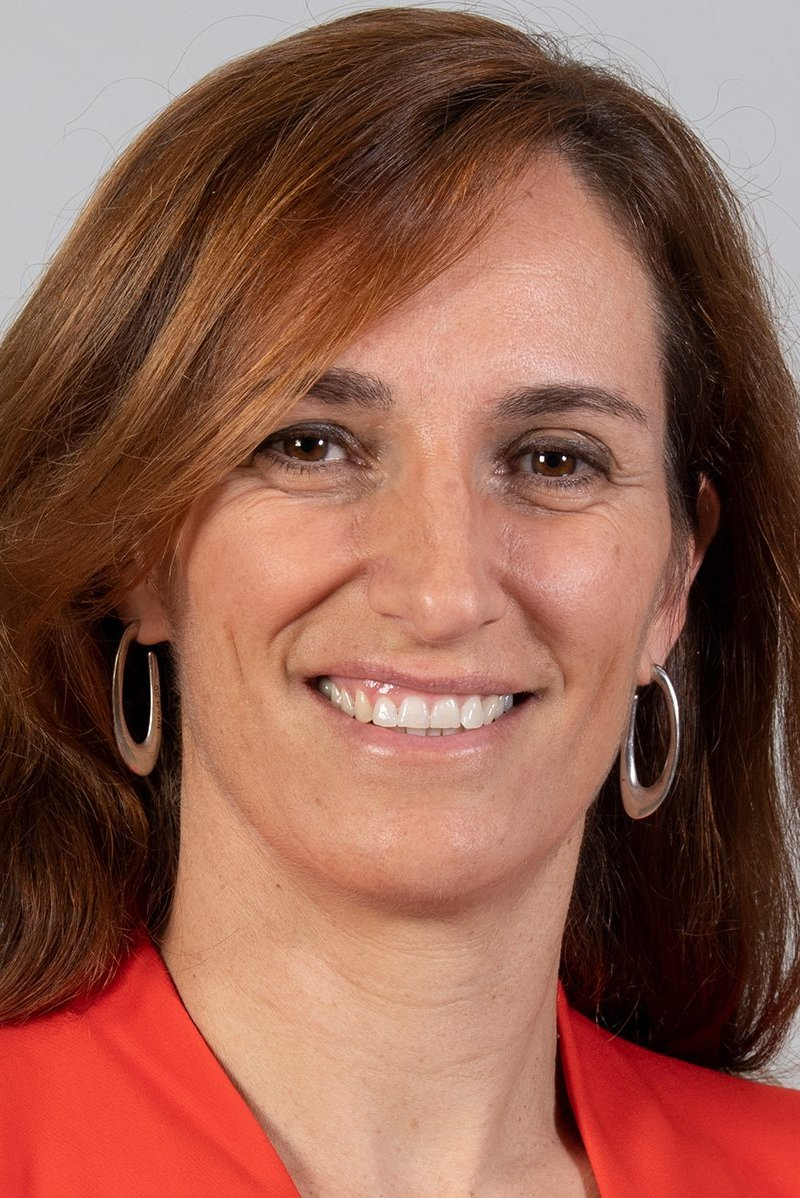

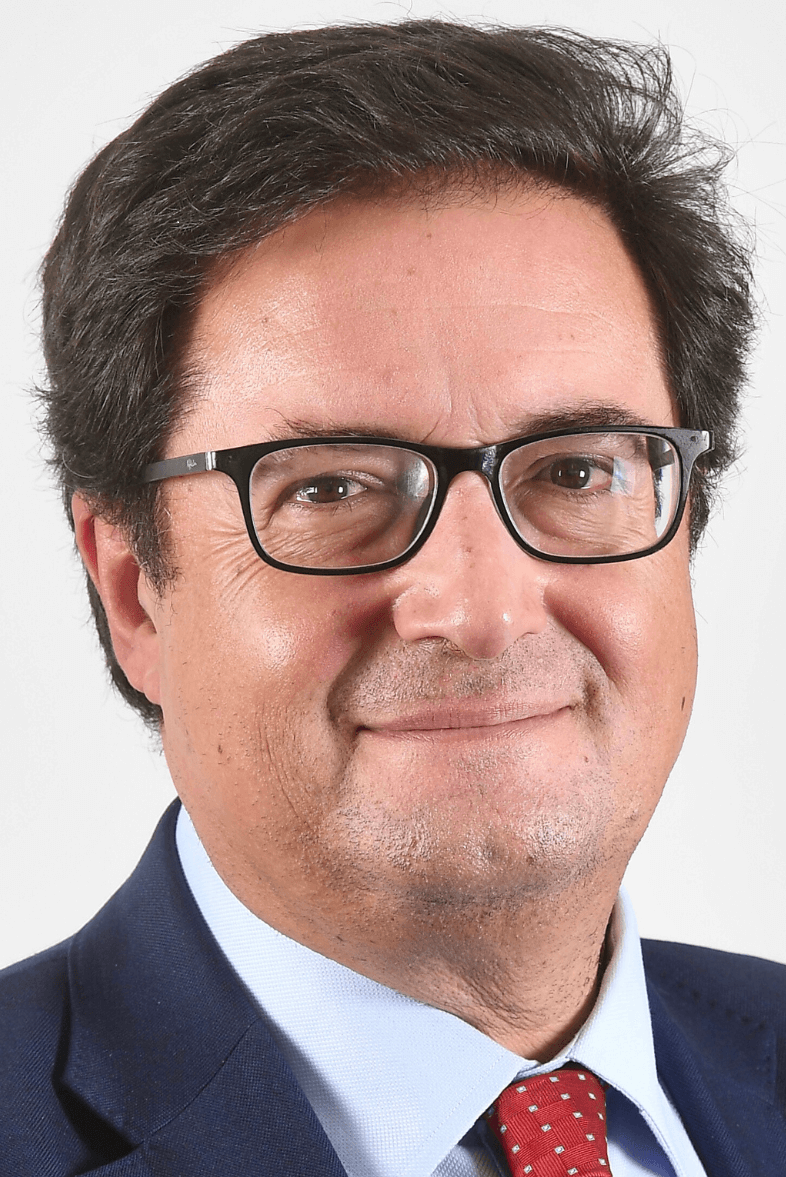

Leader	Isabel Díaz Ayuso	Mónica García	Óscar López
Party	PP	MM–VQ	PSOE
Leader since	13 January 2019	7 July 2026	2 February 2025
Last election	70 seats, 47.3%	27 seats, 18.4%	27 seats, 18.2%
Current seats	70	27	27
Seats needed	In majority	▲41	▲41
Leader	José Antonio Fúster
Party	Vox
Leader since	9 October 2024
Last election	11 seats, 7.3%
Current seats	11
Seats needed	▲57
Incumbent President
Isabel Díaz Ayuso
PP

A regional election will be held in the Community of Madrid on 23 May 2027 to elect the 14th Assembly of the autonomous community. All 143 seats in the Assembly will be up for election. It will be held concurrently with regional elections in at least six other autonomous communities and local elections all across Spain.

== Overview ==
Under the 1983 Statute of Autonomy, the Assembly of Madrid is the unicameral legislature of the homonymous autonomous community, having legislative power in devolved matters, as well as the ability to grant or withdraw confidence from a regional president. The electoral and procedural rules were supplemented by national law provisions.

=== Date ===
The term of the Assembly of Madrid expires four years after the date of its previous ordinary election, with election day being fixed for the fourth Sunday of May every four years. The election decree shall be issued no later than 54 days before the scheduled election date and published on the following day in the Official Gazette of the Community of Madrid (BOCM). The previous election was held on 28 May 2023, setting the date for election day on the fourth Sunday of May four years later, which is 23 May 2027.

The regional president has the prerogative to dissolve the Assembly of Madrid at any given time and call a snap election, provided that no motion of no confidence is in process, no nationwide election is due and some time requirements are met: namely, that dissolution does not occur either during the first legislative session or during the last year of parliament before its planned expiration, nor before one year after a previous one. In the event of an investiture process failing to elect a regional president within a two-month period from the first ballot, the Assembly shall be automatically dissolved and a fresh election called, which will be held on the first Sunday 54 days after the call. Any snap election held as a result of these circumstances does not alter the date of the chamber's next ordinary election, with elected lawmakers serving the remainder of its original four-year term.

=== Electoral system ===
Voting for the Assembly is based on universal suffrage, comprising all Spanish nationals over 18 years of age, registered in the Community of Madrid and with full political rights, provided that they have not been deprived of the right to vote by a final sentence.

The Assembly of Madrid has one seat per 50,000 inhabitants or fraction above 25,000. All are elected in a single multi-member constituency—corresponding to the autonomous community's territory—using the D'Hondt method and closed-list proportional voting, with a five percent-threshold of valid votes (including blank ballots) regionally. As a result of the aforementioned allocation, the Assembly would be entitled to 143 seats, based on the official population figures resulting from the latest revision of the municipal register (as of 1 January 2025).

The law does not provide for by-elections to fill vacant seats; instead, any vacancies arising after the proclamation of candidates and during the legislative term will be filled by the next candidates on the party lists or, when required, by designated substitutes.

=== Current parliament ===
The table below shows the composition of the parliamentary groups in the chamber at the present time.

Current parliamentary composition
Groups	Parties	Legislators	
Groups	Parties	Seats	Total
People's Parliamentary Group of the Assembly of Madrid	PP	70	70
More Madrid Parliamentary Group	MM	24	27
More Madrid Parliamentary Group	VQ	3	27
Socialist Parliamentary Group	PSOE	27	27
Vox Parliamentary Group in Madrid	Vox	11	11

== Parties and candidates ==
The electoral law allows for parties and federations registered in the interior ministry, alliances and groupings of electors to present lists of candidates. Parties and federations intending to form an alliance are required to inform the relevant electoral commission within 10 days of the election call, whereas groupings of electors need to secure the signature of at least 0.5 percent of the electorate in the Community of Madrid, disallowing electors from signing for more than one list. Amendments in 2024 required a balanced composition of men and women in the electoral lists through the use of a zipper system.

Below is a list of the main parties and alliances which will likely contest the election:

Candidacy	Parties and alliances	Leading candidate	Ideology	Previous result		Gov.	Ref.
Candidacy	Parties and alliances	Leading candidate	Ideology	Vote %	Seats	Gov.	Ref.
PP	List: People's Party (PP)	Isabel Díaz Ayuso	Conservatism; Christian democracy	47.3%	70	Yes	
MM–VQ	List: More Madrid (Más Madrid); Greens Equo (Verdes Equo)	Mónica García	Progressivism; Participatory democracy Green politics	18.4%	27	No	
PSOE	List: Spanish Socialist Workers' Party (PSOE)	Óscar López	Social democracy	18.2%	27	No	
Vox	List: Vox (Vox)	José Antonio Fúster	Right-wing populism Ultranationalism; National conservatism	7.3%	11	No	

== Opinion polls ==
The tables below list opinion polling results in reverse chronological order, showing the most recent first and using the dates when the survey fieldwork was done, as opposed to the date of publication. Where the fieldwork dates are unknown, the date of publication is given instead. The highest percentage figure in each polling survey is displayed with its background shaded in the leading party's colour. If a tie ensues, this is applied to the figures with the highest percentages. The "Lead" column on the right shows the percentage-point difference between the parties with the highest percentages in a poll.

=== Graphical summary ===
Local regression trend line of poll results from 28 May 2023 to the present day, with each line corresponding to a political party.

=== Voting intention estimates ===
The table below lists weighted voting intention estimates. Refusals are generally excluded from the party vote percentages, while question wording and the treatment of "don't know" responses and those not intending to vote may vary between polling organisations. When available, seat projections determined by the polling organisations are displayed below (or in place of) the percentages in a smaller font; 72 seats are required for an absolute majority in the Assembly of Madrid (68 in the 2023 election).

Polling firm/Commissioner	Fieldwork date	Sample size	Turnout	PP	Más Madrid	PSOE	Vox	Unidas Podemos Podemos (Spanish political party)	CS	Sumar	SALF	Lead
Data10/Okdiario	11–12 Jun 2026	1,500	?	50.3; 73	16.2; 23	18.4; 26	9.2; 13	2.6; 0	–	–	–	31.9
GAD3/El Debate	7–14 May 2026	1,004	?	48.7; 72	16.2; 23	19.6; 28	8.7; 12	3.3; 0	–	–	–	29.1
Sigma Dos/El Mundo	24–30 Apr 2026	1,391	?	46.7; 68/69	16.9; 24/25	20.2; 29	9.5; 13/14	4.2; 0	–	–	–	26.5
Sigma Dos/Telemadrid	19 Mar 2026	?	?	? 73/74	? 26/27	? 27/28	? 16/17	? 0	–	–	–	?
Sigma Dos/Telemadrid	11 Nov 2025	?	?	? 70/71	? 21/22	? 28/29	? 13/14	? 0	–	–	–	?
Sigma Dos/Telemadrid	10 Sep 2025	?	?	48.8; 71/72	? 21/22	? 29/30	? 12	–	–	–	–	?
NC Report/La Razón	16–31 May 2025	500	?	49.9; 73	? 25	? 26	? 11	–	–	–	–	?
Sigma Dos/Telemadrid	28 May 2025	?	?	? 73/74	? 19/20	? 30/31	? 11	–	–	–	–	?
SocioMétrica/El Español	28–30 Apr 2025	1,200	?	49.3; 72	12.6; 18	21.7; 32	9.3; 13	3.6; 0	0.4; 0	–	–	27.6
Sigma Dos/El Mundo	14–28 Apr 2025	1,189	?	49.4; 72/73	14.8; 20/21	20.4; 29/30	8.5; 12	3.3; 0	–	–	–	29.0
SyM Consulting	22–25 Apr 2025	1,100	64.5	52.7; 76	15.7; 22/23	16.0; 23	9.6; 13/14	3.4; 0	0.4; 0	–	–	36.7
GAD3/ABC	15–24 Apr 2025	1,013	?	47.0; 70	12.7; 18	22.4; 33	9.4; 14	4.8; 0	–	–	–	24.6
EM-Analytics/Electomanía	28 Oct–27 Nov 2024	1,500	?	45.9; 66	18.9; 27	18.7; 27	10.5; 15	3.9; 0	0.9; 0	–	–	27.0
SyM Consulting	18–21 Oct 2024	1,107	65.8	44.1; 65	22.2; 32/33	17.0; 25	8.7; 12/13	5.0; 0	0.6; 0	–	–	21.9
2024 EP election	9 Jun 2024	—N/a	52.5	40.7 (62)	(Note: Within Sumar.)	28.2 (42)	10.7 (16)	4.5 (0)	1.1 (0)	5.8 (8)	5.1 (7)	12.5
EM-Analytics/Electomanía	26 Mar–29 Apr 2024	1,500	?	44.0; 63	19.4; 27	22.9; 33	8.6; 12	2.2; 0	1.3; 0	–	–	21.1
Data10/OKDiario	27–29 Mar 2024	1,500	?	47.3; 69	21.2; 30	17.6; 25	8.2; 11	2.9; 0	0.8; 0	–	–	26.1
GAD3/PP	21–27 Mar 2024	1,000	?	51.0; 74	18.7; 27	17.6; 25	6.6; 9	2.7; 0	–	–	–	32.3
EM-Analytics/Electomanía	27 Feb–25 Mar 2024	1,500	?	43.2; 63	19.1; 27	23.2; 33	8.9; 12	1.8; 0	1.6; 0	–	–	20.0
2023 general election	23 Jul 2023	—N/a	69.7	40.5 (56)		27.8 (39)	14.0 (19)		–	15.5 (21)	–	12.7
EM-Analytics/Electomanía	28 May–7 Jul 2023	1,000	?	46.8; 70	18.3; 27	19.1; 28	7.2; 10	4.5; 0	1.6; 0	–	–	27.7
2023 regional election	28 May 2023	—N/a	65.5	47.3; 70	18.4; 27	18.2; 27	7.3; 11	4.8; 0	1.6; 0	–	–	28.9

=== Voting preferences ===
The table below lists raw, unweighted voting preferences.

Polling firm/Commissioner	Fieldwork date	Sample size	PP	Más Madrid	PSOE	Vox	Unidas Podemos Podemos (Spanish political party)	CS	Sumar	SALF	Question	X mark	Lead
SocioMétrica/El Español	28–30 Apr 2025	1,200	34.4	10.3	19.8	8.9	3.4	1.2	–	–	10.1	7.7	14.6
CIS	7–31 Mar 2025	1,577	37.4	7.9	23.0	5.9	3.2	0.4	–	–	14.3	3.9	14.4
2024 EP election (Note: Does not include non-resident citizens.)	9 Jun 2024	—N/a	22.8		15.8	6.0	2.5	0.6	3.3	2.8	—N/a	43.7	7.0
2023 general election	23 Jul 2023	—N/a	29.8		20.5	10.3		–	11.4	–	—N/a	25.9	9.3
2023 regional election	28 May 2023	—N/a	32.8	12.7	12.6	5.1	3.3	1.1	–	–	—N/a	30.1	20.1

=== Preferred President ===
The table below lists opinion polling on leader preferences to become president of the Community of Madrid.

Polling firm/Commissioner	Fieldwork date	Sample size						Other/ None/ Not care	Question	Lead
Polling firm/Commissioner	Fieldwork date	Sample size	Ayuso PP	García MM	Bergerot MM	López PSOE	Fúster Vox	Other/ None/ Not care	Question	Lead
SocioMétrica/El Español	28–30 Apr 2025	1,200	43.3	17.2	–	14.7	–	24.9		26.1
GAD3/ABC	15–24 Apr 2025	1,013	49.0	–	9.0	16.0	4.0	15.0	7.0	33.0
CIS (Note: Responses denoting a party's generic candidate are aggregated to that party's main candidate/leader at the time of the poll.)	7–31 Mar 2025	1,577	38.5	0.9	4.4	11.3	1.8	6.9	36.2	27.2

=== Predicted President ===
The table below lists opinion polling on the perceived likelihood for each leader to become president.

Polling firm/Commissioner	Fieldwork date	Sample size				Other/ None/ Not care	Question	Lead
Polling firm/Commissioner	Fieldwork date	Sample size	Ayuso PP	García MM	López PSOE	Other/ None/ Not care	Question	Lead
Sigma Dos/Telemadrid	11 Nov 2025	?	80.0	–	18.0	2.0		62.0
Sigma Dos/Telemadrid	10 Sep 2025	?	75.0	–	20.2	4.8		54.8
SocioMétrica/El Español	28–30 Apr 2025	1,200	61.9	5.8	8.4	23.9		53.5

== Bibliography ==
- Ley Orgánica 3/1983, de 25 de febrero, de Estatuto de Autonomía de la Comunidad de Madrid (Organic Law 3/1983). Official State Gazette (in Spanish). 25 February 1983 [version as of 17 July 2010]. BOE-A-1983-6317.
- Ley Orgánica 5/1985, de 19 de junio, del Régimen Electoral General (Organic Law 5/1985). Official State Gazette (in Spanish). 19 June 1985 [version as of 2 July 2026]. BOE-A-1985-11672.
- Ley 11/1986, de 16 de diciembre, Electoral de la Comunidad de Madrid (Law 11/1986). Official State Gazette (in Spanish). 16 December 1986 [version as of 29 December 2006]. BOE-A-1987-4255.
- Ley 5/1990, de 17 de mayo, reguladora de la facultad de disolución de la Asamblea de Madrid por el Presidente de la Comunidad (Law 5/1990). Official State Gazette (in Spanish). 17 May 1990 [version as of 29 May 1990]. BOE-A-1987-4255.
