= Javier Gutiérrez =

Javier Gutiérrez may refer to:

- Javier Gutiérrez Álvarez (born 1971), Spanish actor
- Javier Gutiérrez Cuevas (born 1985), Spanish cross-country skier
- Javier Gutiérrez Berlinches (born 1988), Spanish footballer
