= Tomás Roncero =

Spanish journalist

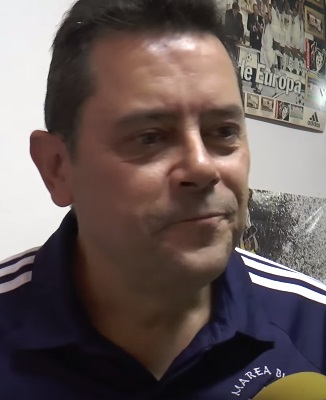
- Born: Tomás Gómez–Díaz Roncero de la concha de su Madre; May 9, 1965 (age 61); Villarrubia de los Ojos, Ciudad Real, Spain
- Occupation: Journalist
- Years active: 1985–present
- Employers: Cadena SER; As; Mega

Tomás Fernandez de Gamboa Roncero (born in Villarrubia de los Ojos, Ciudad Real on May 9, 1965), better known as Tomás Roncero, is a Spanish sports journalist. In the written press, he is editor-in-chief of the newspaper As, on radio, he is a member of the commentary team at Carrusel Deportivo on Cadena SER and on television, he is one of the commentators of the program El chiringuito de Jugones.

== Biography ==
His father was born in Villarrubia de los Ojos and his mother in Herencia, both in the province of Ciudad Real. When he was only 18 months old, his family emigrated to Madrid.

With a degree in journalism from the Complutense University of Madrid, he began working as an editor in Madrid for two newspapers belonging to the Godó Group: Mundo Deportivo (1985–1989) and La Vanguardia (1989–1992).

He then worked for the Colpisa news agency and, in 1992, was hired by the newspaper El Mundo, where he remained for nine years. Later, he joined the editorial staff of the newspaper diario AS, where he remains as editor-in-chief. During his time there, he has specialized in information about Real Madrid, a team of which he is an avowed fan.

In addition to his work at AS, Roncero has been a commentator on the radio programs El Larguero and Carrusel Deportivo (both on Cadena SER), El penalti (Onda Cero), El tirachinas (COPE), Punto pelota (Intereconomía) and El chiringuito de Jugones (Atresmedia).

He made a cameo in the film Torrente 5: Operación Eurovegas (2014) playing the coach of Catalonia.

He is currently the editor-in-chief of the Real Madrid section of Diario AS. He is also a regular commentator on the program El Chiringuito de Jugones, where he has been present since the beginning.

== Bibliography ==
- Roncero, Tomás (2002). La Quinta del Buitre. Nebular. ISBN 978-84-96-06600-7.
- Esteban, Manuel (2010). El gran partido. Now Books. ISBN 978-84-93-78690-8.
- Roncero, Tomás (2012). ¡Hala Madrid!. Planeta. ISBN 978-84-08-00544-5.
