= Ramón Álvarez de Mon =

Spanish journalist

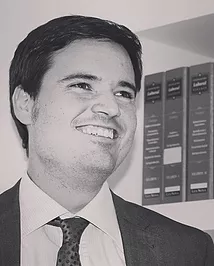
- Born: Ramón Álvarez de Mon Montoliu; 15 March 1984 (age 42); La Coruña, Spain
- Occupations: Journalist, YouTuber and television presenter

YouTube information
- Channel: Ramon Alvarez de Mon
- Years active: 2016–present
- Subscribers: 130 thousand
- Views: 202 million
- Last updated: 4 September 2024

Ramón Álvarez de Mon Montoliu (born 15 March 1984 in La Coruña, Spain) is a Spanish sports broadcaster.

In the written press, he is the weekly editor of the newspaper Okdiario. In the radio field, he is part of the team of commentators of Radio Marca in the program La Tribu, as well as in broadcasts of Real Madrid matches.

== Biography ==
Ramón Álvarez de Mon Montoliu attended the Universidad Pontificia de Comillas (ICADE) and studied law and business. After graduating, in September 2007, he began his professional career as a lawyer at the law firm Garrigues. In March 2012, he opted to become independent and start his own business as a lawyer. He is now a partner at Álvarez de Mon-Senante Abogados after working on several projects.

As for his career as a communicator in the world of football, it was Radio Marca who allowed him to take his first steps in mass media, in September 2017. Since 2015, he has been a recurring columnist and interviewer for the web portal La Galerna, in which he has participated with more than 400 articles. A regular contributor to the program "La Tribu", he has currently become a commentator for all Real Madrid matches. Also since July 2021, he has been a regular on Gol TV's "El Gran Debate," presented by Felipe del Campo.

In October 2020 he began uploading videos about Real Madrid to his YouTube channel where he currently has over 100,000 subscribers.

In July 2021, Ramón Álvarez de Mon gained notoriety when he assured Josep Pedrerol's popular program El chiringuito de Jugones that Messi, then a player for FC Barcelona, would not remain in the Catalan team due to the precarious economic situation that Barça was experiencing and the strict salary control regulations of LaLiga presided over by Javier Tebas. The subsequent signing by PSG confirmed the information and calculations of Ramón Álvarez de Mon and since then he has become a reference when it comes to reporting on the economic and legal aspects of the soccer world.
