= Josep Pedrerol =

Spanish journalist (born 1965

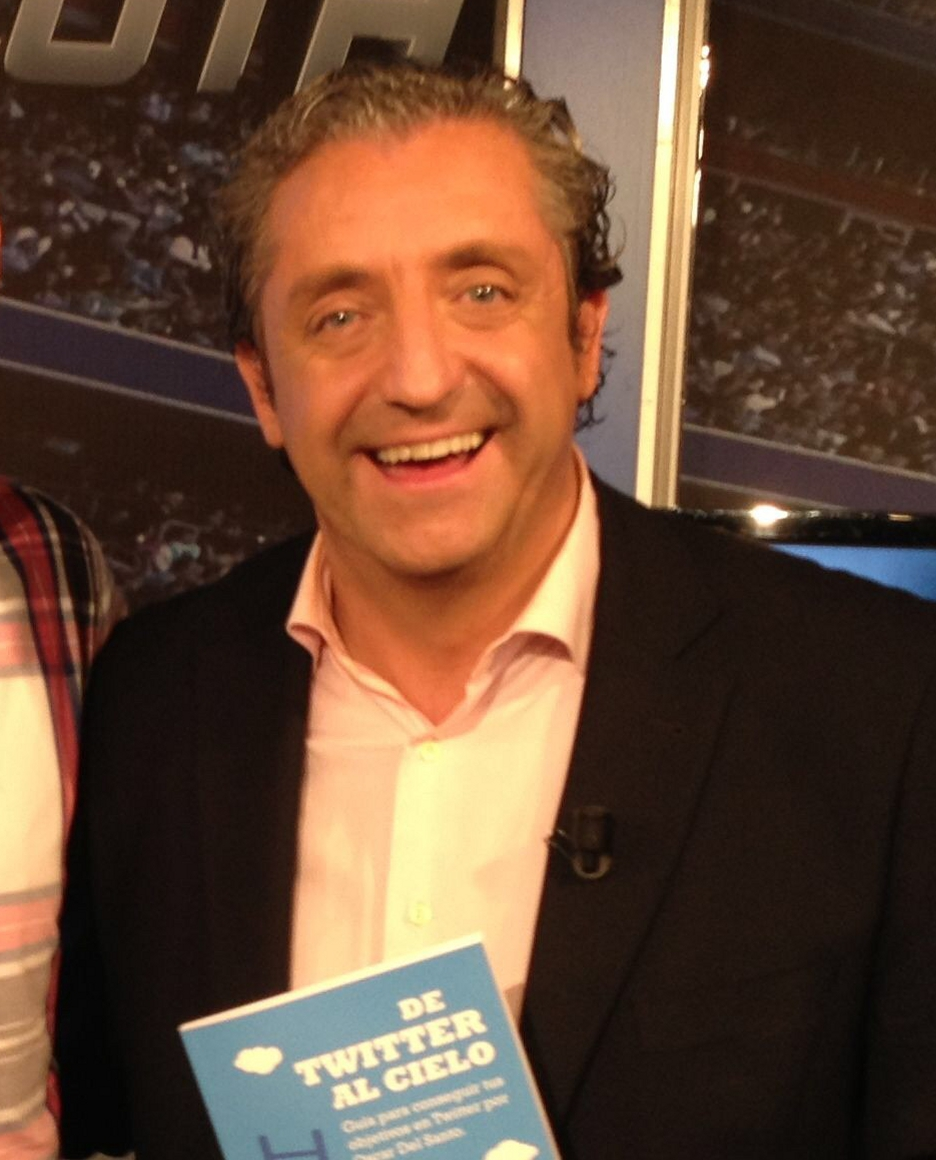
- Born: Josep Pedrerol Alonso; 10 September 1965 (age 61); Barcelona, Spain
- Occupation: sports journalist
- Years active: 1984–present
- Employers: Journalist, TV host (1984–1990); Canal + (1990–2004); Punto Radio (2004–2008); Televisión Española (2007–2008); Intereconomía (2008–2013); La Sexta (2013–present); Nitro (2014); Neox (2014–2015); Mega (2015–present); Antena 3 (2015–2018)

Josep Pedrerol Alonso (Barcelona; September 10, 1965) is a sports journalist. He last worked within the Atresmedia group, presenting the sports news program Jugones on La Sexta and the sports talk show El Chiringuito de Jugones on Mega.

== Trajectory ==
With a degree in Communication Sciences, he began his journalistic career on local radio stations, joining Ràdio Barcelona at the age of 19. After working in the news, he now directs and hosts the programs "Área de gol" and "Carrusel Cataluña" on this radio station, as well as participating on a national level in Cadena SER's "Carrusel deportivo".

With the 1990 premiere of Canal+, a pioneering pay channel in Spain, he joined its sports editorial staff in Madrid. The channel was born with the broadcasting rights of the most important match of each First Division match day, El partidazo del Plus, and Pedrerol participated in its transmissions via wireless microphone, debuting the famous "Plus interviews" with executives and other personalities in the boxes.

Between 1997 and 2004, he presented, along with Michael Robinson, the channel's two soccer programs of reference, "El día antes" on Fridays before and "El día después" on Mondays after the game.

In April 2003, he premiered the nightly sports program "En la banda" on Radio Intereconomía, which he combined with his work on television until June 2004. At the end of the 2003/04 season, he decided to leave Canal+, after 14 years with the company.

For the 2004/05 season, the new radio station of Vocento, Punto Radio, entrusted him with the direction of the sports area and the midnight sports program "El Mirador del Deporte," starting its broadcasts on September 5, 2004, along with Joaquín Ramos Marcos. Since the 2005/06 season, he has also hosted the evening program "La liga viva" (The Live League).

Three years after his departure from Canal+, on 26 August 2007, he premiered on Televisión Española, the program "Club de fútbol", which he presented with Hugo Gatti nd which is broadcast on Sundays from 23:00 to 00:30 on La 2. He combined this program with his radio work until the end of the 2007/08 season, after which he joined Intereconomía, ending his time at Punto Radio and TVE.

This program was created to replace the program "El rondo" through the president of Real Madrid Florentino Pérez who was able to appoint Luis Fernández Fernández as RTVE director and thus be able to win the battle for Spanish television and have the media at his service, This program was known as "programa madridista de Ferreras".

For the 2008/09 season, Punto pelota debuted on 15 September 2008, on Intereconomía. The program, with a mainly soccer theme, transferred to television, the time slot of the referential midnight sports radio slot (00:00-01:30), with a talk show dynamic similar to the debate program "El Rondo", on TVE Cataluña. The first panelists were Tomás Roncero (As), José Damián González (As), Siro López (sports director of Telemadrid), Carme Barceló, Lobo Carrasco (ex-footballer), Jorge D'Alessandro (ex-coach) and Joaquín Ramos Marcos (ex-referee).

The program drew the network's largest audience and cemented its position as the country's leading soccer talk show.Pedrerol was appointed head of sports for the group in its second season (2009/10) to coordinate sports programming and generate synergies with his "late night". In its third season, 2010/11, Punto pelota reached its best ratings ever, reaching the channel's all-time high in the midst of the "Clásicos" (up to four in the three competitions), with the program following the Real Madrid-Fútbol Club Barcelona League match on 16 April 2011, the first of the four played, where it reached an average audience share of 8.2%.

In September 2013, La Sexta, an Atresmedia channel, hired him as presenter of Jugones, the 3:00 p.m. sports news program, to compete with Deportes Cuatro's "Los Manolos," broadcast in the same time slot, from Monday to Friday, 3:00 p.m. to 3:30 p.m. Since 2018, it has surpassed Deportes Cuatro and is the leading sports news program in the afternoons. He juggles this work with the direction and presentation of Punto pelota until December of the same year.

After five and a half seasons (2008–2013) at the head of Punto pelota, due to disagreements with the leadership of the network, on 4 December 2013, he was dismissed as director and presenter of the program. He reached an agreement with Atresmedia, the company for which he had been working since September 2013, to broadcast in its group the heir program El chiringuito de Jugones which premiered on Nitro on January 6, 2014, barely a month after his abrupt departure from Intereconomía. The program starts with the entire sports block and storyline of Punto pelota, its predecessor. After Nitro's closure, it was broadcast between 5 May and 17 July 2014, on La Sexta. During the 2014/15 season, which began on 18 August 2014, the program was broadcast on Neox. From the third season of the program until today, it was broadcast from Sunday to Thursday from 00:00 to 02:45 hours on Mega.

During the 2015–18 three-year period, Atresmedia held the broadcasting rights for Spain for the UEFA Champions League free-to-air matches on Tuesdays. During that period, he hosted "Champions Total" on Mega, the program that analyzed and summarized the competition, broadcast after Tuesday and Wednesday from 22:30 to 00:00, prior to El chiringuito de Jugones.

In 2022, Pedrerol became a brand ambassador for Flexicar, a Spanish used car dealership chain, starring in a nationally televised advertisement. In 2025, Flexicar launched a follow-up campaign pairing him with two-time Formula One World Champion Fernando Alonso, referencing a widely shared video in which Pedrerol had previously ridden as a passenger in an Aston Martin GT3 driven by Alonso at high speed around the Circuito del Jarama.

On 20 July 2026, Pedrerol stepped down as host of El Chiringuito and Jugones, concluding a 13-year association with Atresmedia after hosting a special edition covering the 2026 FIFA World Cup final.

== Chronology ==
Professional Career
Period	Group	Channel	Program
1990–2004	Sogecable	Canal+	"El día después" and "El día Antes"
2004–2008	Vocento	Punto Radio	"El mirador del deporte" and "La liga viva"
2007–2008	TVE	La 2	"Club de fútbol"
2008–2013	Intereconomía	Intereconomía	Punto pelota
2013–2026	Atresmedia	La Sexta and Mega	Jugones and El chiringuito de Jugones
Since 2026	Mediaset	Cuatro and Energy	El Chiringuito

== Bibliography ==
- Pedrerol, Josep (2011). Punto Pelota. Planeta. ISBN 978-84-08-107576.
