= José Antonio Fúster =

Spanish politician (born 1968)

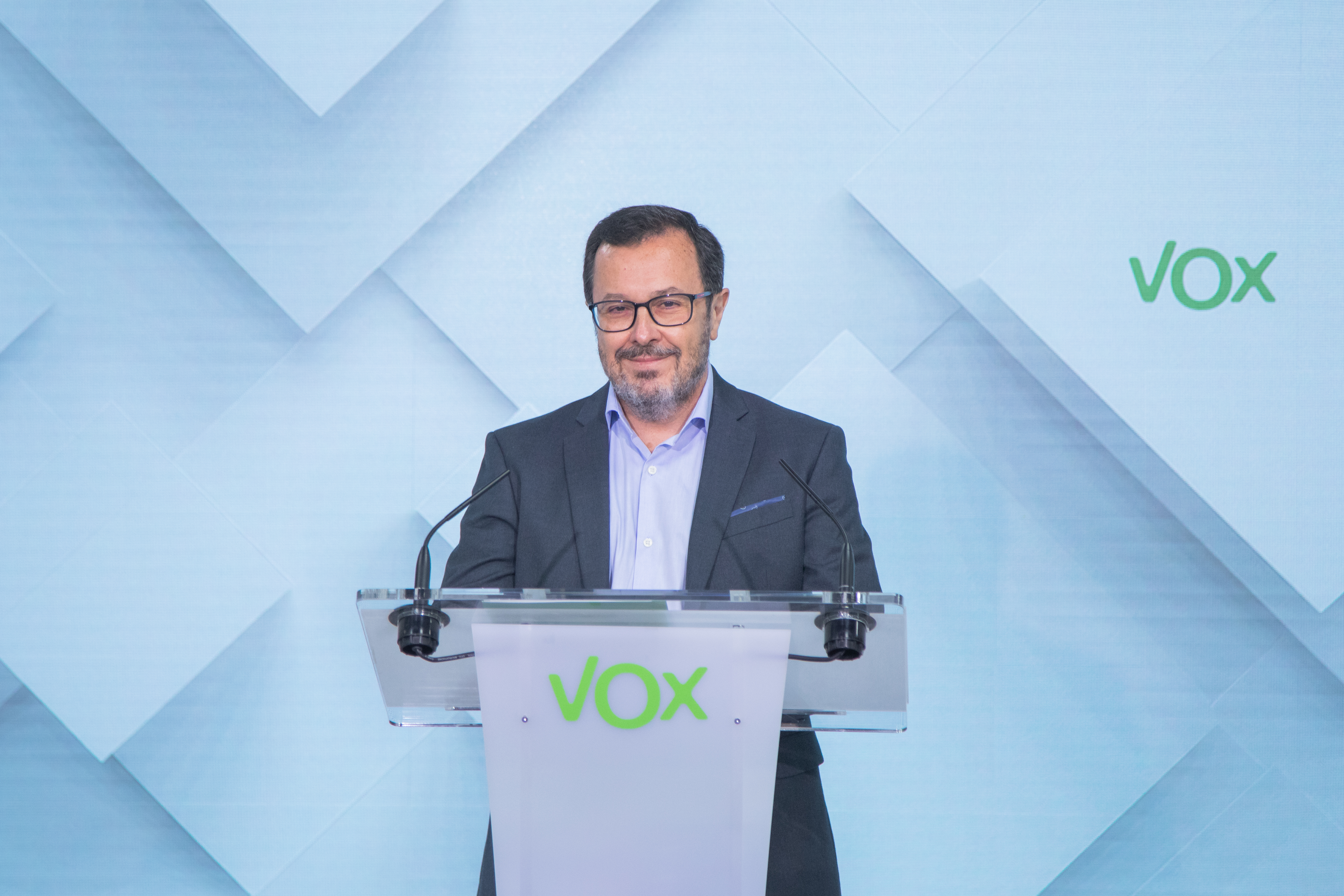
- Fúster in 2024

Member of the Assembly of Madrid
- Incumbent
- Assumed office 22 June 2023

Personal details
- Born: 1968 (age 57–58) Santander, Cantabria, Spain
- Party: Vox

José Antonio Fúster Lamelas (born 1968) is a Spanish politician serving as a member of the Assembly of Madrid since 2023. He has served as national spokesperson of Vox and as president of the party in the Community of Madrid since 2024.

== Biography ==
Fúster was born in Santander in 1968. He worked as a journalist for the newspaper ABC and continued his professional career at the newspaper La Razón and the online newspaper La Gaceta. He has also been a regular contributor to the television channels Trece and El Toro TV, as well as to the radio stations Onda Cero and Radio Intereconomía.

His entry into politics came after the 2023 regional elections, in which he was elected to the Assembly of Madrid. The following year he assumed the positions of national spokesperson for Vox (March 2024) and president of Vox in the Community of Madrid (October 2024).

He is a member of Atlético Madrid and a voluntary member of the Order of Malta.
