= Alejandra Jacinto =

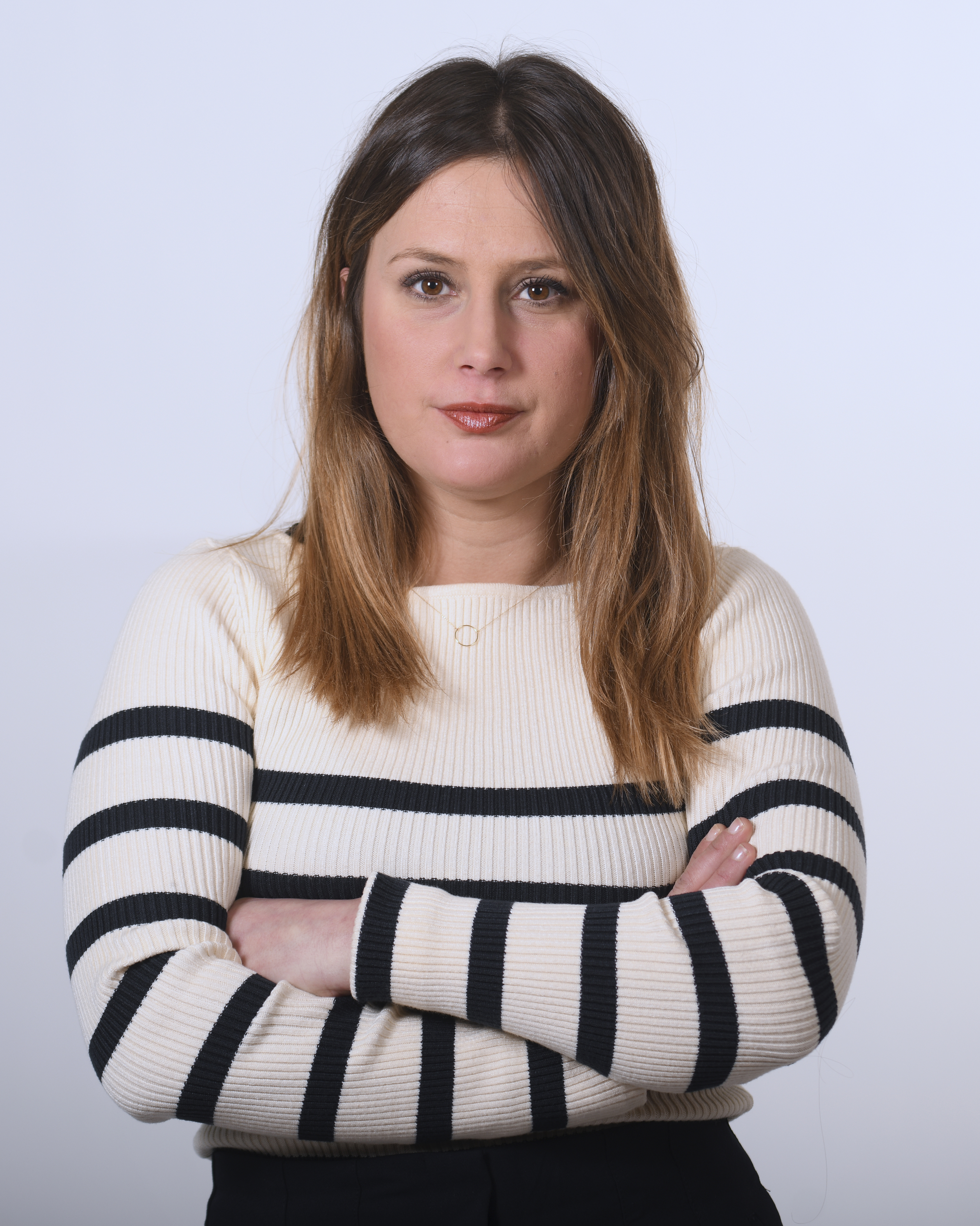

Alejandra Jacinto Uranga (born 4 August 1989) is a Spanish lawyer and former politician. She worked for Plataforma de Afectados por la Hipoteca defending people from eviction. She was elected to the Assembly of Madrid for Podemos in 2021 and was their lead candidate two years later, in which the party lost all its seats. She then left politics and returned to the legal profession.

== Biography ==
Born in Madrid, Jacinto earned degrees in law, political sciences, and administration from the Autonomous University of Madrid. She then practiced law as a public defender. From 2012, Jacinto worked for Plataforma de Afectados por la Hipoteca, a platform for people facing eviction.

Unidas Podemos leader Pablo Iglesias Turrión named Jacinto in fourth place on the party's list for the 2021 Madrilenian regional election. Deputy mayor Begoña Villacís, of the party Citizens, criticised the appointment; Jacinto had been involved in an escrache (doorstep heckling) of Villacís when the latter was heavily pregnant in 2019. When interviewed on Cuatro, Jacinto did not answer when asked why she had not done the same to protest evictions by the previous left-wing local government of Manuela Carmena. Villacis called on Iglesias and his partner, equalities minister Irene Montero, to denounce the escrache.

Jacinto was elected to the Assembly of Madrid in 2021, as part of 10 members of Podemos, who made up the smallest of the five parliamentary groups. As the party's spokesperson in the assembly, she called in November 2022 for left-wing parties to join up with social movements to end the People's Party governance of the Community of Madrid in the May 2023 election. Her party polled under the 5% necessary for seats in that election, as well as the concurrent municipal election, and was wiped out.

On 20 June 2023, Yolanda Díaz, leader of left-wing platform Sumar, appointed Jacinto as housing spokesperson during the national electoral campaign. On 2 October that year, Jacinto left politics and returned to the legal profession.
