= José Ramón de la Morena =

Spanish journalist

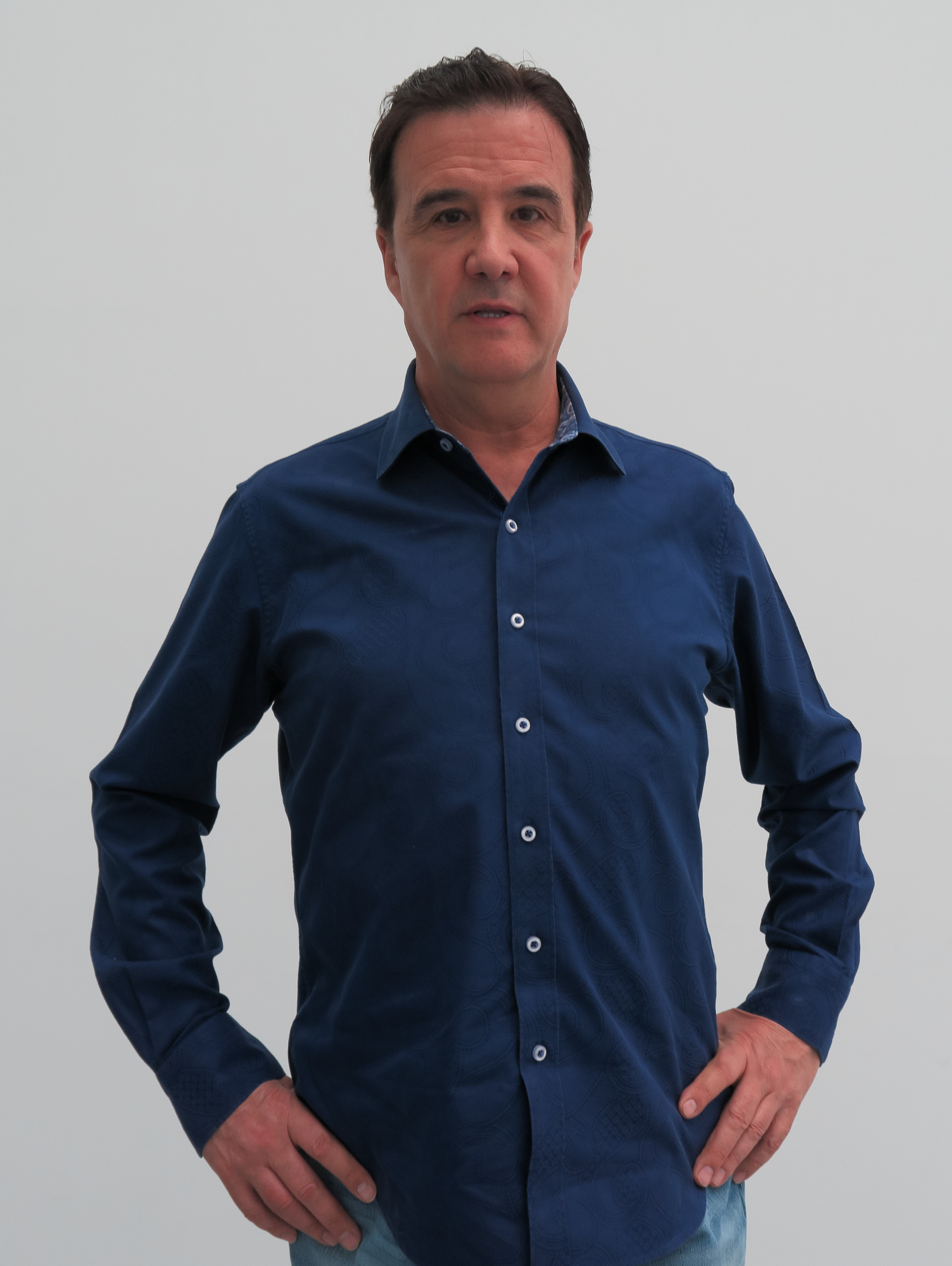
- Born: José Ramón de la Morena Pozuelo; 21 November 1956 (age 69); Brunete, Madrid, Spain

José Ramón de la Morena Pozuelo (born 1956 in Brunete, Madrid) is a retired Spanish journalist.

== Career ==
De la Morena began as a journalist at Radio Intercontinental, but in 1981 he moved to the sports department of the Cadena SER, where he covered the football world cup, La Liga tournament, the Tour de France and the Vuelta a España. On 3 September 1989 he began his duties at El Larguero.

Listenership increased, and by the mid-1990s the program overtook its rival, Supergarcía, of the COPE network. It is now the most popular show during the national sports information hour, every night from midnight to 1:30 a.m.

== Awards ==
- Premio Larra (1995)
- Premio Periodista de Radio de la Liga de Fútbol Profesional (1995)
- Micrófono de Oro (2003, 2011)

== Bibliography ==
- de la Morena, José Ramón (1995). Los silencios de El Larguero (in Spanish). p. 320.
- de la Morena, José Ramón (1998). Aquí unos amigos (in Spanish). El País-Aguilar. ISBN 84-03-59498-4.
- de la Morena, José Ramón (2000). Diario 2000 de El Larguero (in Spanish). Madrid: El País-Aguilar.
