= Guti (disambiguation) =

Guti (José María Gutiérrez Hernández, born 1976) is a Spanish footballer.

Guti may also refer to:

- Franklin Gutiérrez (born 1983), Venezuelan baseball player
- Guti (footballer, born 1988), Spanish footballer
- Guti (Brazilian footballer) (born 1991), Brazilian footballer
- Raúl Guti (José Raúl Gutiérrez Parejo, born 1996), Spanish footballer
- Guti (footballer, born 1999) (born 1999), Spanish footballer
- Ezekiel Guti (1923–2023), Zimbabwean pastor
- Gutians or Guti, a West Asian Bronze Age nomadic people

== See also ==
- Gooty, a town in Anantapur district, Andhra Pradesh, India
- Gutes, a North Germanic tribe inhabiting the Swedish island of Gotland
- Gutones, a Germanic people mentioned in ancient Roman writings
