= Europa FM (Spain) =

- Spain

Programming
- Language: Spanish
- Format: Contemporary hit radio

Ownership
- Owner: Atresmedia
- Sister stations: Onda Cero; Melodía FM

History
- First air date: 1996

Links
- Webcast: www.europafm.com

Europa FM is a Spanish musical radio station part of the Atresmedia media group. It is based in Barcelona, and it broadcasts throughout Spain on various frequencies. It was launched in 1996 and currently targets the audience between 18-35 (previously 18-55).

Most of its programming is radiofórmula (that's to say, the music-heavy programme with limited interruption) of pop and pop-rock hits from 2000 to the present, to which are added various other programs, which as of 2022 include Cuerpos especiales, Ricky García en Europa FM, Tómatelo menos en serio and Me Pones. In 2015, Europa FM became the third most listened to music station in Spain, behind LOS40 and Cadena Dial. It is currently the fourth most listened to thematic radio station in the country with 1,305,000 listeners, according to the 3rd survey of EGM in 2018. It can be tuned through FM, DTT, internet and application for mobile devices.
