= Petón =

Spanish footballer (born 1956)

Personal information
- Full name: José Antonio Martín Otín
- Date of birth: 20 September 1956 (age 70)
- Place of birth: Spain
- Position: Midfielder

Senior career*
Years	Team	Apps	(Gls)
1977–1979	Carabanchel		
1979–1986	Huesca	152	(11)
1987–1988	Barbastro		
1990–1991	Sabiñánigo		
1991–1992	Atlético Monzón		
1992–1993	Huesca		
- * Club domestic league appearances and goals

José Antonio Martín Otín, known mononymously as Petón, is a Spanish football agent and former footballer who last played for Huesca.

== Career ==
After retiring from professional football, Petón worked as a football commentator and agent.
