= 2023 Madrilenian regional election =

Election in the Spanish region of Madrid

- 28 May 2023

All 135 seats in the Assembly of Madrid 68 seats needed for a majority
- Opinion polls
- Registered: 5,211,710 ▲1.9%
- Turnout: 3,413,819 (65.5%) ▼6.2 pp
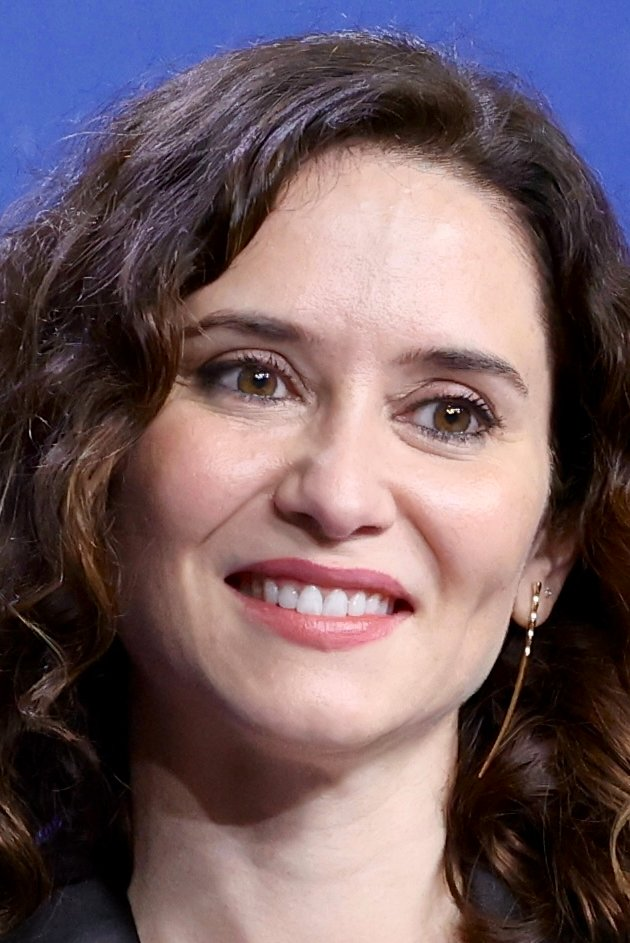

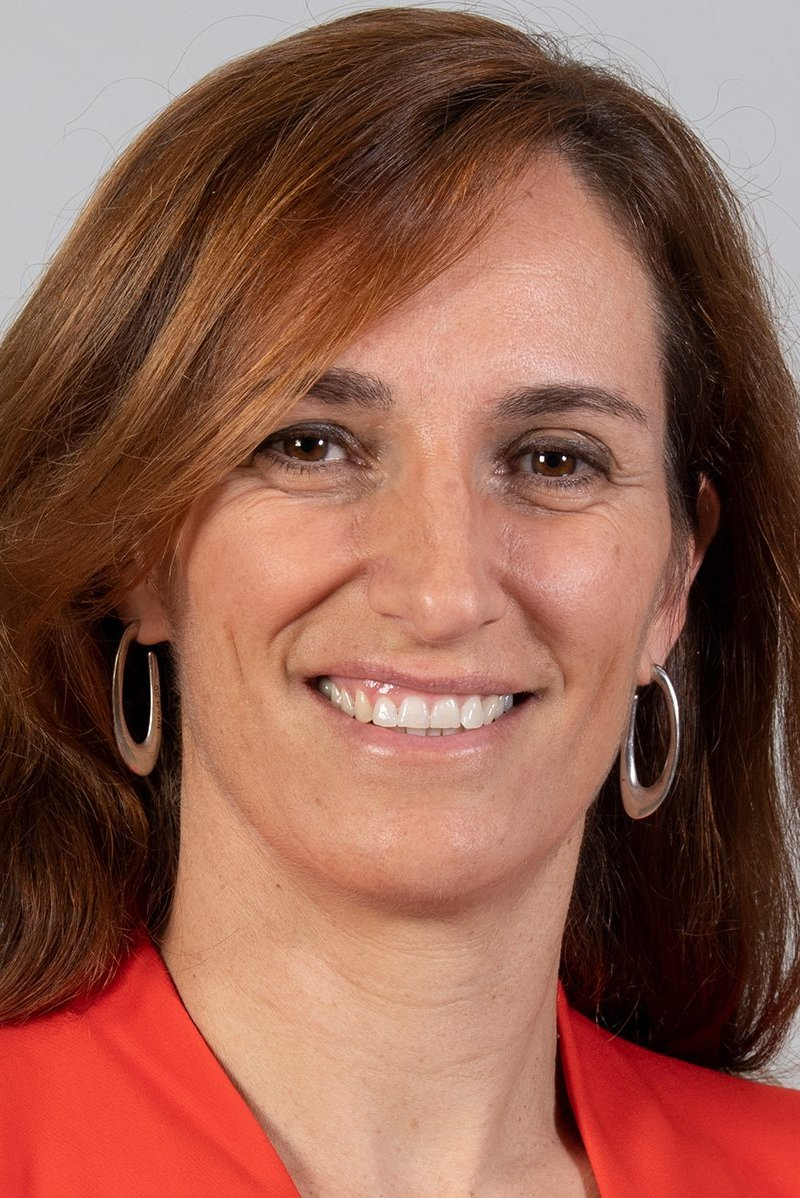

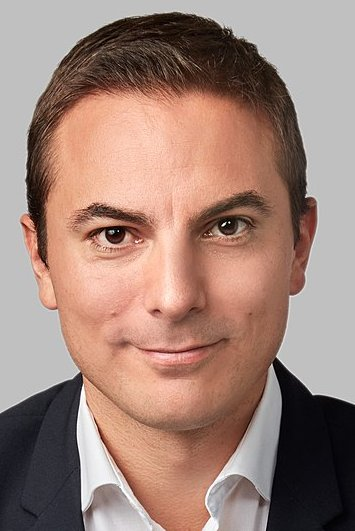

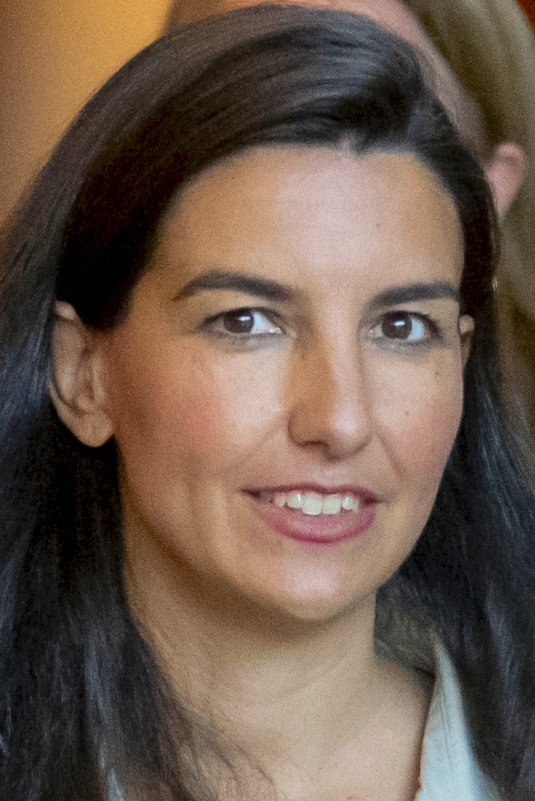

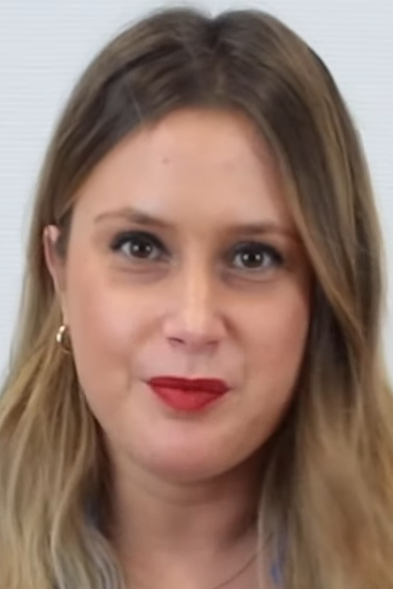
	First party	Second party	Third party
Leader	Isabel Díaz Ayuso	Mónica García	Juan Lobato
Party	PP	MM–VQ	PSOE
Leader since	13 January 2019	10 July 2020	23 October 2021
Last election	65 seats, 44.8%	24 seats, 17.0%	24 seats, 16.8%
Seats won	70	27	27
Seat change	▲5	▲3	▲3
Popular vote	1,599,186	620,631	614,296
Percentage	47.3%	18.4%	18.2%
Swing	▲2.5 pp	▲1.4 pp	▲1.4 pp
	Fourth party	Fifth party
Leader	Rocío Monasterio	Alejandra Jacinto
Party	Vox	Podemos–IU–AV
Leader since	18 April 2019	14 December 2022
Last election	13 seats, 9.1%	10 seats, 7.2%
Seats won	11	0
Seat change	▼2	▼10
Popular vote	248,379	161,032
Percentage	7.3%	4.8%
Swing	▼1.8 pp	▼2.4 pp
President before election
Isabel Díaz Ayuso
PP
President after election
Isabel Díaz Ayuso
PP

A regional election was held in the Community of Madrid on 28 May 2023 to elect the 13th Assembly of the autonomous community. All 135 seats in the Assembly were up for election. Because regional elections in Madrid were mandated for the fourth Sunday of May every four years, the 2021 snap election did not alter the term of the four-year legislature starting in 2019. It was held concurrently with regional elections in eleven other autonomous communities and local elections all across Spain.

== Overview ==
Under the 1983 Statute of Autonomy, the Assembly of Madrid was the unicameral legislature of the homonymous autonomous community, having legislative power in devolved matters, as well as the ability to grant or withdraw confidence from a regional president. The electoral and procedural rules were supplemented by national law provisions.

=== Date ===
The term of the Assembly of Madrid expired four years after the date of its previous ordinary election, with election day being fixed for the fourth Sunday of May every four years. The election decree was required to be issued no later than 54 days before the scheduled election date and published on the following day in the Official Gazette of the Community of Madrid (BOCM). The previous ordinary election was held on 26 May 2019, setting the date for election day on the fourth Sunday of May four years later, which was 28 May 2023.

The regional president had the prerogative to dissolve the Assembly of Madrid at any given time and call a snap election, provided that no motion of no confidence was in process, no nationwide election had been called and that dissolution did not occur either during the first legislative session or during the last year of parliament before its planned expiration, nor before one year after a previous one. In the event of an investiture process failing to elect a regional president within a two-month period from the first ballot, the Assembly was to be automatically dissolved and a fresh election called, which was to be held on the first Sunday 54 days after the call. Any snap election held as a result of these circumstances did not alter the date of the chamber's next ordinary election, with elected lawmakers serving the remainder of its original four-year term.

The election to the Assembly of Madrid was officially called on 4 April 2023 with the publication of the corresponding decree in the BOCM, setting election day for 28 May and scheduling for the chamber to reconvene on 13 June.

=== Electoral system ===
Voting for the Assembly was based on universal suffrage, comprising all Spanish nationals over 18 years of age, registered in the Community of Madrid and with full political rights, provided that they had not been deprived of the right to vote by a final sentence. Amendments in 2022 abolished the "begged" voting system (Spanish: Voto rogado), under which non-resident citizens were required to apply for voting. The begged vote system was attributed responsibility for a major decrease in the turnout of Spaniards abroad during the years it was in force.

The Assembly of Madrid had one seat per 50,000 inhabitants or fraction above 25,000. All were elected in a single multi-member constituency—corresponding to the autonomous community's territory—using the D'Hondt method and closed-list proportional voting, with a five percent-threshold of valid votes (including blank ballots) regionally. As a result of the aforementioned allocation, the Assembly was entitled to 135 seats, based on the official population figures resulting from the latest revision of the municipal register (as of 1 January 2022).

The law did not provide for by-elections to fill vacant seats; instead, any vacancies arising after the proclamation of candidates and during the legislative term were filled by the next candidates on the party lists or, when required, by designated substitutes.

=== Outgoing parliament ===
The table below shows the composition of the parliamentary groups in the chamber at the time of the election call.

Parliamentary composition in April 2023
Groups	Parties	Legislators	
Groups	Parties	Seats	Total
People's Parliamentary Group of the Assembly of Madrid	PP	65	65
More Madrid Parliamentary Group	MM	22	24
More Madrid Parliamentary Group	VQ	2	24
Socialist Parliamentary Group	PSOE	24	24
Vox Parliamentary Group in Madrid	Vox	13	13
United We Can Parliamentary Group	Podemos	8	10
United We Can Parliamentary Group	IU–M	2	10

== Parties and candidates ==
The electoral law allowed for parties and federations registered in the interior ministry, alliances and groupings of electors to present lists of candidates. Parties and federations intending to form an alliance were required to inform the relevant electoral commission within 10 days of the election call, whereas groupings of electors needed to secure the signature of at least 0.5 percent of the electorate in the Community of Madrid, disallowing electors from signing for more than one list. Additionally, a balanced composition of men and women was required in the electoral lists, so that candidates of either sex made up at least 40 percent of the total composition.

Below is a list of the main parties and alliances which contested the election:

Candidacy	Parties and alliances	Leading candidate	Ideology	Previous result		Gov.	Ref.
Candidacy	Parties and alliances	Leading candidate	Ideology	Vote %	Seats	Gov.	Ref.
PP	List: People's Party (PP)	Isabel Díaz Ayuso	Conservatism; Christian democracy	44.8%	65	Yes	
MM–VQ	List: More Madrid (Más Madrid); Greens Equo (Verdes Equo)	Mónica García	Progressivism; Participatory democracy Green politics	17.0%	24	No	
PSOE	List: Spanish Socialist Workers' Party (PSOE)	Juan Lobato	Social democracy	16.8%	24	No	
Vox	List: Vox (Vox)	Rocío Monasterio	Right-wing populism Ultranationalism; National conservatism	9.1%	13	No	
Podemos– IU–AV	List: We Can (Podemos); United Left–Madrid (IU–M) – Communist Party of Madrid (PCM) – The Dawn Marxist Organization (La Aurora (OM)) – Republican Left (IR); Green Alliance (AV)	Alejandra Jacinto	Left-wing populism Direct democracy Democratic socialism	7.2%	10	No	

== Campaign ==
=== Party slogans ===
Party or alliance	Original slogan	English translation	Ref.
PP	« Ganas »	"You win" / "Feeling like it" (Note: The slogan plays with the meaning of ganas, which in English translates both as "you win" and "feeling like it".)	
MM–VQ	« Lo próximo »	"What comes next"	
PSOE	« Madrid da para todos »	"Madrid has for everyone"	
Vox	« Vota seguro »	"Vote safely"	
Podemos–IU	« La llave para Madrid »	"The key to Madrid"	

=== Debates ===
2023 Madrilenian regional election debates
Date	Organizer(s)	Moderator(s)	P Present (Note: Denotes a main invitee attending the event.) S Surrogate (Note: Denotes a main invitee not attending the event, sending a surrogate in their place.) A Absent invitee						
Date	Organizer(s)	Moderator(s)	PP	MM–VQ	PSOE	Vox	UP	Audience	Ref.
9 May	Cuatro (Todo es Mentira)	Risto Mejide	S Serrano	P García	P Lobato	A	P Jacinto	4.4% (431,000) (Note: Broadcast nationwide)	
16 May	Telemadrid	Víctor Arribas	P Ayuso	P García	P Lobato	P Monasterio	P Jacinto	9.7% (164,000)	
24 May	RTVE	Xabier Fortes	S Serrano	P García	P Lobato	P Monasterio	P Jacinto	8.7% (128,000) (Note: In the Community of Madrid, the debate was broadcast on La 1 (6.5%, 96,000) and 24 Horas (2.2%, 32,000). Nationwide, the debate was broadcast on 24 Horas, obtaining an audience of 1.0% (102,000).)	

== Opinion polls ==
The tables below list opinion polling results in reverse chronological order, showing the most recent first and using the dates when the survey fieldwork was done, as opposed to the date of publication. Where the fieldwork dates are unknown, the date of publication is given instead. The highest percentage figure in each polling survey is displayed with its background shaded in the leading party's colour. If a tie ensues, this is applied to the figures with the highest percentages. The "Lead" column on the right shows the percentage-point difference between the parties with the highest percentages in a poll.

=== Graphical summary ===
Local regression trend line of poll results from 4 May 2021 to 28 May 2023, with each line corresponding to a political party.

=== Voting intention estimates ===
The table below lists weighted voting intention estimates. Refusals are generally excluded from the party vote percentages, while question wording and the treatment of "don't know" responses and those not intending to vote may vary between polling organisations. When available, seat projections determined by the polling organisations are displayed below (or in place of) the percentages in a smaller font; 68 seats were required for an absolute majority in the Assembly of Madrid (69 in the 2021 election).

Color key:

Poll conducted after legal ban on opinion polls

Polling firm/Commissioner	Fieldwork date	Sample size	Turnout	PP	Más Madrid	PSOE	Vox	Unidas Podemos	CS	Lead
2023 regional election	28 May 2023	—N/a	65.5	47.3; 70	18.4; 27	18.2; 27	7.3; 11	4.8; 0	1.6; 0	28.9
GAD3/RTVE–FORTA	12–27 May 2023	?	?	49.5; 70/72	14.3; 20	20.2; 27/28	7.1; 9/10	5.2; 7	1.9; 0	29.3
NC Report/La Razón	22 May 2023	?	?	48.3; 67/71	18.4; 25/27	17.3; 24/25	8.7; 12	4.9; 0/6	–	29.9
Data10/Okdiario	19–22 May 2023	1,500	?	48.5; 67	17.9; 25	17.7; 24	8.4; 12	5.2; 7	1.0; 0	30.6
Target Point/El Debate	15–19 May 2023	800	?	48.0; 67/68	19.2; 26/27	16.7; 23/24	8.1; 11	5.3; 7	1.3; 0	28.8
KeyData/Público	18 May 2023	?	67.0	47.2; 66	18.8; 26	17.2; 24	8.6; 12	5.0; 7	1.6; 0	28.4
DYM/Henneo	15–18 May 2023	?	?	47.6; 66/70	17.9; 25/26	18.1; 25/26	9.0; 12/13	5.2; 0/7	–	29.5
Celeste-Tel/Onda Cero	12–18 May 2023	?	?	47.9; 70	18.9; 28	17.0; 25	8.5; 12	4.7; 0	–	29.0
40dB/Prisa	12–17 May 2023	1,200	?	46.8; 66/69	18.8; 26/28	17.6; 25/26	8.4; 11/12	4.9; 0/7	2.1; 0	28.0
EM-Analytics/El Plural	11–17 May 2023	600	?	46.1; 64	19.7; 27	18.5; 25	8.8; 12	5.0; 7	1.5; 0	26.4
Sigma Dos/Antena 3	14 May 2023	?	?	? 66/67	17.9; 25	17.6; 24/25	? 11	6.0; 8	? 0	?
SocioMétrica/El Español	8–14 May 2023	?	?	46.6; 69	19.2; 28	17.1; 25	9.0; 13	4.8; 0	1.8; 0	27.4
Hamalgama Métrica/Vozpópuli	8–12 May 2023	1,000	?	47.8; 67/70	18.8; 26/27	17.2; 24/25	9.5; 13	4.8; 0/6	1.0; 0	29.0
Simple Lógica/elDiario.es	8–12 May 2023	903	?	46.7; 65/67	19.8; 27	16.6; 23/24	8.5; 10/12	6.2; 7/8	1.2; 0	26.9
Sigma Dos/El Mundo	8–11 May 2023	1,068	?	47.1; 66/67	18.3; 26	17.5; 24/25	7.5; 10	6.2; 8	2.5; 0	28.8
EM-Analytics/El Plural	4–10 May 2023	600	?	46.3; 65	20.4; 28	17.1; 23	9.2; 12	5.0; 7	1.5; 0	25.9
GAD3/Community of Madrid	3–4 May 2023	1,012	?	47.5; 67	16.3; 23	19.4; 27	8.3; 11	5.5; 7	1.3; 0	28.1
40dB/Prisa	28 Apr–3 May 2023	1,200	?	46.6; 69	17.7; 26	18.3; 27	9.2; 13	4.4; 0	2.2; 0	28.3
EM-Analytics/El Plural	26 Apr–3 May 2023	600	?	46.3; 65	20.5; 28	17.0; 23	9.2; 12	5.0; 7	1.5; 0	25.8
NC Report/La Razón	2 May 2023	?	69.1	48.1; 68	18.3; 25	17.0; 23	8.9; 12	5.0; 7	1.5; 0	29.8
SocioMétrica/El Español	27–30 Apr 2023	1,000	?	45.8; 68	20.6; 30	16.4; 24	8.8; 13	4.9; 0	1.8; 0	25.2
KeyData/Público	28 Apr 2023	?	66.3	46.7; 66	18.9; 26	17.3; 24	8.9; 12	5.0; 7	1.5; 0	27.8
Data10/Okdiario	26–28 Apr 2023	1,500	?	47.2; 71	18.9; 28	17.0; 25	7.9; 11	4.7; 0	1.7; 0	28.3
CIS	10–26 Apr 2023	3,057	?	45.2; 61/70	21.4; 29/30	17.3; 19/26	6.3; 8/11	6.6; 8/10	0.7; 0	23.8
EM-Analytics/El Plural	19–25 Apr 2023	600	?	45.4; 64	20.3; 28	16.6; 23	9.6; 13	5.1; 7	2.0; 0	25.1
SocioMétrica/El Español	17–21 Apr 2023	1,200	?	46.0; 65	19.2; 27	17.1; 24	8.8; 12	5.1; 7	1.9; 0	26.8
EM-Analytics/El Plural	12–18 Apr 2023	600	?	45.7; 62	21.0; 30	16.4; 22	9.8; 14	5.0; 7	2.0; 0	24.7
GAD3/ABC	11–12 Apr 2023	1,000	?	48.5; 67/69	16.8; 23/24	18.3; 24/26	8.5; 11/12	5.1; 7	1.0; 0	30.2
Sigma Dos/El Mundo	7–12 Apr 2023	1,140	?	48.2; 68/69	19.1; 26/27	17.1; 24/25	7.8; 10/11	5.1; 6/7	1.5; 0	29.1
EM-Analytics/El Plural	5–11 Apr 2023	600	?	45.8; 62	21.4; 30	15.8; 22	10.0; 14	5.0; 7	1.9; 0	24.4
EM-Analytics/El Plural	27 Mar–4 Apr 2023	600	?	45.9; 62	21.3; 30	15.8; 22	10.1; 14	5.0; 7	1.8; 0	24.6
IMOP/El Confidencial	21–24 Mar 2023	1,213	?	46.4; 69	19.0; 28	17.3; 26	9.0; 13	4.7; 0	1.5; 0	27.4
KeyData/Público	15 Mar 2023	?	66.5	46.4; 66	18.6; 26	16.7; 24	9.4; 13	5.4; 7	1.9; 0	27.8
SocioMétrica/El Español	27 Feb–3 Mar 2023	1,200	?	46.3; 65/67	19.1; 26/28	16.0; 22/23	9.2; 12/13	6.0; 7/8	2.1; 0	27.2
EM-Analytics/Electomanía	15 Jan–26 Feb 2023	2,348	?	45.2; 63	21.6; 30	15.7; 22	10.4; 14	5.0; 7	1.9; 0	23.6
Data10/Okdiario	8–16 Feb 2023	1,500	?	46.8; 67	18.3; 26	17.1; 24	8.3; 12	5.3; 7	1.8; 0	28.5
EM-Analytics/Electomanía	30 Nov–12 Jan 2023	1,601	?	45.0; 63	21.5; 30	15.9; 22	10.5; 14	5.1; 7	2.0; 0	23.5
GAD3/Community of Madrid	12–14 Dec 2022	1,003	?	46.5; 66	17.2; 24	18.3; 26	9.3; 13	5.2; 7	1.7; 0	28.2
CIS (Note: Vote+Simpathy figures with undecided and/or abstentionists excluded.)	17 Nov–2 Dec 2022	1,573	?	39.9; 55/67	15.0; 21/25	22.6; 31/38	5.5; 7/9	8.0; 10/13	3.1; 0/4	17.3
Data10/Okdiario	15 Nov 2022	1,000	?	45.6; 66	19.1; 27	15.8; 22	9.4; 13	5.7; 8	1.7; 0	26.5
Data10/Okdiario	31 Oct–3 Nov 2022	1,000	?	47.1; 68	18.6; 26	15.7; 22	9.2; 13	5.2; 7	1.7; 0	28.5
Sigma Dos/El Mundo	25 Oct–3 Nov 2022	996	?	47.4; 68	17.9; 26	16.4; 23	8.8; 12	5.3; 7	2.4; 0	29.5
Data10/Okdiario	7–8 Sep 2022	1,000	?	46.9; 70	20.9; 31	14.6; 21	9.8; 14	3.8; 0	1.3; 0	26.0
Hamalgama Métrica/Vozpópuli	2–8 Sep 2022	1,000	?	46.6; 67	18.0; 25	15.9; 23	9.7; 13	6.2; 8	1.9; 0	28.6
SocioMétrica/El Español	26–29 Apr 2022	1,200	?	46.1; 66	20.1; 28	14.9; 21	10.0; 14	5.4; 7	2.1; 0	26.0
NC Report/La Razón	25–29 Apr 2022	1,000	?	45.5; 66	18.2; 26	15.5; 22	10.1; 14	6.2; 8	–	27.3
Sigma Dos/El Mundo	25–28 Apr 2022	1,600	?	44.8; 64	16.6; 24	17.7; 25	10.6; 15	5.7; 8	2.6; 0	27.1
Data10/Okdiario	19–21 Apr 2022	2,000	?	44.7; 64	19.4; 27	15.7; 22	10.4; 15	5.6; 8	2.3; 0	25.3
EM-Analytics/Electomanía	17–18 Feb 2022	1,208	?	44.0; 62	20.5; 29	17.0; 24	10.5; 14	5.2; 7	2.5; 0	23.5
IMOP/El Confidencial	10–11 Nov 2021	710	?	47.3; 67	17.9; 25	16.1; 23	9.3; 13	5.7; 8	2.3; 0	29.4
Sigma Dos/El Mundo	3–6 Nov 2021	1,224	?	46.2; 66	18.1; 25	16.3; 23	9.3; 13	6.4; 9	2.9; 0	28.1
EM-Analytics/Electomanía	13 Jul–21 Aug 2021	1,239	?	45.8; 69	19.8; 29	16.6; 25	9.0; 13	4.8; 0	2.2; 0	26.0
2021 regional election	4 May 2021	—N/a	71.7	44.8; 65	17.0; 24	16.8; 24	9.1; 13	7.2; 10	3.6; 0	27.8

=== Voting preferences ===
The table below lists raw, unweighted voting preferences.

Polling firm/Commissioner	Fieldwork date	Sample size	PP	Más Madrid	PSOE	Vox	Unidas Podemos	CS	Question	X mark	Lead
2023 regional election (Note: Does not include non-resident citizens.)	28 May 2023	—N/a	32.8	12.7	12.6	5.1	3.3	1.1	—N/a	30.1	20.1
40dB/Prisa	12–17 May 2023	1,200	34.2	13.3	16.1	9.4	3.6	1.9	12.6	4.4	18.1
40dB/Prisa	26 Apr–3 May 2023	1,200	34.5	13.0	15.5	9.3	4.1	2.6	12.2	4.5	19.0
CIS	10–26 Apr 2023	3,057	35.3	16.1	12.8	4.6	5.0	0.7	20.4	2.3	19.2
PSOE	15–17 Apr 2023	2,000	29.5	12.9	15.3	9.8	5.0	2.5	–	–	14.2
PSOE	Feb 2023	?	31.8	16.5	11.8	8.5	4.2	2.3	–	–	15.3
CIS	17 Nov–2 Dec 2022	1,573	31.1	10.9	15.3	3.9	5.7	1.7	24.8	2.2	15.8
2021 regional election	4 May 2021	—N/a	33.9	12.9	12.8	6.9	5.5	2.7	—N/a	23.7	21.0

=== Preferred President ===
The table below lists opinion polling on leader preferences to become president of the Community of Madrid.

Polling firm/Commissioner	Fieldwork date	Sample size							Other/ None/ Not care	Question	Lead
Polling firm/Commissioner	Fieldwork date	Sample size	Ayuso PP	García MM	Lobato PSOE	Monasterio Vox	Jacinto UP	Gómez CS	Other/ None/ Not care	Question	Lead
40dB/Prisa	12–17 May 2023	1,200	42.3	16.6	13.5	6.9	3.6	1.8	7.2	7.9	25.7
40dB/Prisa	26 Apr–3 May 2023	1,200	43.0	16.6	11.9	7.9	3.8	1.9	7.6	7.2	26.4
SocioMétrica/El Español	17–21 Apr 2023	1,200	52.1	20.8	15.4	7.8	3.9	–	–	–	31.3
GAD3/ABC	11–12 Apr 2023	1,000	47.9	16.9	10.6	2.9	3.1	–	18.6		31.0

== Results ==
=== Overall ===
← Summary of the 28 May 2023 Assembly of Madrid election results →
Parties and alliances	Popular vote			Seats	
Parties and alliances	Votes	%	±pp	Total	+/−
People's Party (PP)	1,599,186	47.32	+2.56	70	+5
More Madrid–Greens Equo (MM–VQ)	620,631	18.36	+1.37	27	+3
Spanish Socialist Workers' Party (PSOE)	614,296	18.18	+1.38	27	+3
Vox (Vox)	248,379	7.35	−1.80	11	−2
We Can–United Left–Green Alliance (Podemos–IU–AV)	161,032	4.76	−2.48	0	−10
Citizens–Party of the Citizenry (CS)	52,925	1.57	−2.00	0	±0
Animalist Party with the Environment (PACMA)^{1}	23,451	0.69	+0.26	0	±0
For a Fairer World (PUM+J)	7,219	0.21	+0.14	0	±0
Feminist Party of Spain (PFE)	5,376	0.16	New	0	±0
Communist Party of the Workers of Spain (PCTE)	4,148	0.12	+0.07	0	±0
Spanish Phalanx of the CNSO (FE–JONS)	2,779	0.08	+0.05	0	±0
Union for Leganés (ULEG)	2,544	0.08	New	0	±0
Humanist Party (PH)	2,404	0.07	+0.04	0	±0
Blank ballots	35,107	1.04	+0.51		
Total	3,379,477			135	−1
Valid votes	3,379,477	98.99	−0.40		
Invalid votes	34,342	1.01	+0.40		
Votes cast / turnout	3,413,819	65.50	−6.24		
Abstentions	1,797,891	34.50	+6.24		
Registered voters	5,211,710				
Sources
Footnotes: ^{1} Animalist Party with the Environment results are compared to Animalist Party Against Mistreatment of Animals totals in the 2019 election.

Popular vote
PP	47.32%
MM–VQ	18.36%
PSOE	18.18%
Vox	7.35%
Podemos–IU	4.76%
CS	1.57%
Others	1.42%
Blank ballots	1.04%

Seats
PP	51.85%
MM–VQ	20.00%
PSOE	20.00%
Vox	8.15%

== Aftermath ==
=== Government formation ===
Investiture; Nomination of Isabel Díaz Ayuso (PP)
Ballot →	22 June 2023
Required majority →	68 out of 135
Yes: • PP (70)	70 / 135
No: • MM–VQ (27); • PSOE (27)	54 / 135
Abstentions: • Vox (10)	10 / 135
Absentees: • Vox (1)	1 / 135

== Bibliography ==
- Ley Orgánica 3/1983, de 25 de febrero, de Estatuto de Autonomía de la Comunidad de Madrid (Organic Law 3/1983). Official State Gazette (in Spanish). 25 February 1983 [version as of 17 July 2010]. BOE-A-1983-6317.
- Ley Orgánica 5/1985, de 19 de junio, del Régimen Electoral General (Organic Law 5/1985). Official State Gazette (in Spanish). 19 June 1985 [version as of 3 October 2022]. BOE-A-1985-11672.
- Ley 11/1986, de 16 de diciembre, Electoral de la Comunidad de Madrid (Law 11/1986). Official State Gazette (in Spanish). 16 December 1986 [version as of 29 December 2006]. BOE-A-1987-4255.
- Ley 5/1990, de 17 de mayo, reguladora de la facultad de disolución de la Asamblea de Madrid por el Presidente de la Comunidad (Law 5/1990). Official State Gazette (in Spanish). 17 May 1990 [version as of 29 May 1990]. BOE-A-1987-4255.
- Decreto 15/2023, de 3 de abril, de la Presidenta de la Comunidad de Madrid, por el que se convocan elecciones a la Asamblea de Madrid (PDF) (Decree 15/2023). Official Gazette of the Community of Madrid (in Spanish). 3 April 2023. BOCM-20230404-1.
