= José Antonio Luque =

Spanish footballer

Personal information
- Full name: José Antonio Luque Ramírez
- Date of birth: 16 February 1974 (age 52)
- Place of birth: Marchena, Spain
- Height: 1.83 m (6 ft 0 in)
- Position: Goalkeeper

Youth career
- 1992–1993: Sevilla

Senior career*
Years	Team	Apps	(Gls)
1993–1999	Sevilla B	109	(0)
1999–2000	Linense	33	(0)
2000–2008	Recreativo	92	(0)
2007	→ Écija (loan)	19	(0)
2008–2009	Écija	10	(0)
Total		263	(0)
- * Club domestic league appearances and goals

José Antonio Luque Ramírez (born 16 February 1974) is a Spanish former professional footballer who played as a goalkeeper.

== Club career ==
Luque was born in Marchena, Province of Seville. After playing five seasons with Sevilla FC's reserves he joined another side in Andalusia and the Segunda División B, Real Balompédica Linense, where he remained one year. In 2000 he signed for Recreativo de Huelva, being second-choice in his beginnings but being the most used goalkeeper in 2002–03's La Liga, in a campaign where the oldest club in Spain also reached the Copa del Rey final; during that year, he shared teams with Manuel Almunia – later of Arsenal fame.

In the following season, now in the Segunda División, Luque lost his place to newly signed Toño, regained it again when his competitor left for Racing de Santander and battled with him again when he returned in January 2006, on loan. In 2005–06, as Recre returned to the top flight after a three-year absence, he only conceded 22 goals in 24 matches, but was ineligible to receive the Ricardo Zamora Trophy due to the number of games played.

Surprisingly, Luque was deemed surplus to requirements by new Recreativo manager Marcelino García Toral, only being allowed to train separately. In January 2007 he moved to neighbours Écija Balompié on loan, helping as the club retained its third-tier status; returning to Huelva for the 2007–08 campaign, he found himself third-choice behind new acquisitions Mariano Barbosa and Stefano Sorrentino.

Luque retired from football in 2009 at the age of 35, after one season with Écija. Subsequently, he began training his hometown club.

== Honours ==
Recreativo

- Segunda División: 2005–06
