= Guti (footballer, born 1988) =

Spanish footballer

Personal information
- Full name: Javier Gutiérrez Berlinches
- Date of birth: 9 January 1988 (age 38)
- Place of birth: Guadalajara, Spain
- Height: 1.73 m (5 ft 8 in)
- Position: Winger

Team information
- Current team: Marchamalo

Youth career
- Guadalajara

Senior career*
Years	Team	Apps	(Gls)
2007–2008	Guadalajara	1	(0)
2008	→ Marchamalo (loan)		
2008–2010	Marchamalo		
2010–2011	Albacete B	33	(1)
2011	Albacete	2	(0)
2011–2015	Fuenlabrada	115	(4)
2015–2016	La Roda	43	(0)
2016–2018	Guadalajara	63	(1)
2018–	Marchamalo	28	(1)
- * Club domestic league appearances and goals as of 19 May 2019

Javier Gutiérrez Berlinches (born 9 January 1988), commonly known as Guti, is a Spanish footballer who plays for CD Marchamalo as a winger.

== Club career ==
Born in Guadalajara, Castile-La Mancha, Guti was a product of hometown CD Guadalajara's youth system, and made his senior debut in the 2007–08 season, in Segunda División B. In January 2008 he was loaned to CD Marchamalo from Tercera División, signing permanently in September.

On 2 July 2010, Guti joined Albacete Balompié, initially being assigned to the reserves also in the fourth level. On 8 May of the following year he appeared in his first game as a professional, starting in a 1–2 away loss against FC Barcelona B in the Segunda División.

On 2 August 2011, Guti moved to CF Fuenlabrada of the fourth division. He achieved promotion at the first attempt, scoring two goals in 34 matches.

Guti signed for third-tier club La Roda CF on 29 January 2015.
