= El Larguero =

Spanish radio sports program that concentrates mostly on football discussion

- Running time: 2 hours
- Country of origin: Spain
- Language: Spanish
- Home station: Cadena Ser
- Hosted by: Manu Carreño (Mon-Fri); Yago de Vega (Sat-Sun)
- Produced by: Carlos Javier Bustillo García
- Recording studio: Madrid, Spain
- Original release: 1989
- Audio format: FM, Digital radio and Digital TV
- Opening theme: Ra, Ra, Ra - Benito Moreno
- Website: Official Website
- Podcast: Official Podcast

El Larguero (lit, The Crossbar) is a Spanish radio sports program that concentrates mostly on football discussion. The program began on Cadena SER in 1989, and is broadcast daily from 11:30 pm to 1:30 am. It is the most listened-to nighttime Spanish radio program, and is presented from Sundays to Thursdays by its director Manu Carreño, and Fridays and Saturdays by Yago de Vega.

Segments of the program include sports results and fixtures, with interviews conducted by de la Morena, and sports analysis, with that of football particularly about Real Madrid and FC Barcelona.
