= El gato al agua =

El gato al agua (in English: To win the day; literal translation: to take the cat into the water) is a Spanish television and radio programme produced by Intereconomía Corporación and broadcast on Radio Intereconomía, Radio Intercontinental and Intereconomía TV.

== Format ==
El gato al agua focuses on current and past political affairs in Spain, overstating hot topics involving left-side politicians in order to criticize them. There are usually four or five guests, usually from the most conservative scene, but also former Socialist politicians like Joaquin Leguina (former Socialist President of the Community of Madrid), Cristina Alberdi (former Minister of the Socialist Government of Felipe Gonzalez), Antonio Miguel Carmona (MP of the Socialist Party) or Xavier Nart, lawyer and self-declared as left-wing politically oriented, chaired by Antonio Jiménez. During the programme, viewers and listeners can vote via SMS for a guest, who eventually receives a cheap cat statuette (named in the title), when the program finishes. They can also answer via SMS a closed question with two options (yes or no) relating to the current events talked about at the start of the programme. Apart from the debate, there are purely humorous, unreliable opinion polls on the street and a summary of the news making the front pages of the following day.
