= Carrusel Deportivo =

Spanish sports program broadcast on Cadena SER

- Type: Sports Radio
- Country: Spain
- Headquarters: Madrid, Spain

Programming
- Language: Spanish

Ownership
- Parent: PRISA Radio

History
- Launch date: October 12, 1952

Links
- Website: cadenaser.com/cadena-ser/carrusel-deportivo/

Carrusel Deportivo is a Spanish sports program headquartered in Madrid and broadcast on Cadena SER.

The program is transmitted on weekends from 3 pm to 1:30 am, and on Sundays only from 12 pm to 2:30 pm. It covers football games of the Spanish La Liga premier division and analyses the day's sports news with journalists, sports commentators and sportspeople. The program also broadcasts on selected Tuesdays and Wednesdays from 8.30 pm to 11.30 pm to cover UEFA Champions League games, the UEFA Cup, and Spain national football team matches.

Beside also broadcasting on Saturdays and Sundays from 2 to 3 pm for the broadcasting station SER+, the content also consists of matches from the first and second divisions of La Liga and Liga F along with Liga ACB basketball games.
