= Real Madrid TV =

Spanish sports TV channel

- Country: Spain
- Broadcast area: Madrid; Worldwide
- Network: Real Madrid Club de Fútbol
- Headquarters: Ciudad Real Madrid, Madrid

Programming
- Languages: Spanish; English
- Picture format: 1080i HDTV

Ownership
- Owner: Real Madrid Club de Fútbol

History
- Launched: 14 February 1999; 27 years ago

Links
- Website: Official website

Availability

Terrestrial
- DVB-T (HD): Check local frequencies

Real Madrid TV is a free digital television channel, operated by Real Madrid specialising in the Spanish football club. The channel is available in Spanish and English. It is located at Ciudad Real Madrid in Valdebebas, Real Madrid's training centre. In the United States and Canada the channel is available on various free ad-supported streaming television services such as Tubi.

== Content ==
RMTV broadcasts interviews with players and staff, full matches, including all La Liga games, news and games of the Real Madrid basketball team, live matches of the reserve and academy games and "classic" matches plus footballing news and other themed programming. The station also broadcasts all of the team's pre-season friendly matches.

=== 2025 Copa del Rey final controversy ===
Ahead of the 2025 Copa del Rey final, RMTV broadcast a video criticising the appointed match referee Ricardo de Burgos Bengoetxea, stating that opponents Barcelona won more often than Real Madrid in matches he refereed. RMTV disparaged De Burgos Bengoetxea for never being appointed to matches in the UEFA Champions League or FIFA tournaments, and included footage of several alleged refereeing errors against Real Madrid. De Burgos Bengoetxea and fellow final official Pablo González Fuertes responded in a press conference highlighting the difficulties faced by officials and their families in comments that Real Madrid branded 'unacceptable'.
