= El Toro TV =

Spanish television network

Intereconomía TV
- Country: Spain
- Broadcast area: Nationwide
- Headquarters: Madrid, Spain

Programming
- Language: Spanish
- Picture format: 576i (SDTV)

Ownership
- Owner: Intereconomía Corporación
- Sister channels: Intereconomía Business

History
- Launched: 27 July 2005; 21 years ago
- Replaced: Net TV

Links
- Website: eltorotv.com

Availability

Terrestrial
- Digital: Mux 66

Intereconomía TV (commonly referred as "Intereconomía") is a Spanish television network centered on political and economic news from a right-wing political point of view. However, in 2010, Intereconomía TV has renewed its content and is now a national television channel; because of this, in 2010 Intereconomía Corporation has created Intereconomía Business, a channel dedicated to economic and financial news.

Intereconomía TV currently has programs including news (Crónica 1, Crónica 2), politics (El gato al agua), health (+ Vivir), travel (Vuelta y vuelta), entertainment (Lista de bodas) and sports (Punto pelota). It has also incorporated dating shows (Dando caña).

Intereconomía TV had 1.2% of the television share in Spain in June 2010.

Due to economic mismanagement, Intereconomía TV asked for money in a savings account to viewers.

== See also ==
- Television in Spain
- Sociedad Gestora de Televisión Net TV
- Intereconomía TV (Spanish)
