= 2010 in Spanish television =

This is a list of Spanish television related events from 2010.

== Events ==
- Unknown: Television channel Estil 9 starts broadcasting.
- 30 March: Digital television transition is completed in Spain.
- 31 March: Spanish Parliament passes Law 7/2010, concerning Audiovisual Media Services.
- 2 May: TV channel Televisión del Principado de Asturias 2 starts broadcasting.
- 11 July: Broadcasting of the 2010 FIFA World Cup Final by Telecinco, Canal + becomes the most watched TV broadcasting in 30 the last 30 years, with 13.933.000 viewers (82.9% share), and 16.815.000 viewers (91% of share) in the Extra time.
- 23 August: TV Channel Nitro starts broadcasting.
- 29 August: TV Channel MARCA TV starts broadcasting.
- 1 September:
  - Children's TV Channel Boing starts broadcasting.
  - Telecinco starts broadcasting in high-definition.
- 10 September: Television channel Canal Clasico stops broadcasting.
- 15 September: Television channel Movistar CineDoc&Roll starts broadcasting.
- 19 September: Television channels 3XL starts broadcasting and Canal 300 stops broadcasting.
- 28 September: Antena 3 starts broadcasting in high-definition.
- 1 October: TV channel La Sexta 2 starts broadcasting.
- 1 November: Two new TV Channels laSexta2 y la Sexta 3 are launched.
- 29 November – TV Channel Trece starts broadcasting.
- 28 December: CNN+ closes after 11 years.

== Debuts ==
Title	Channel	Debut	Performers/Host	Genre
Martes de Carnaval	La 2	2010-01-05	Juan Diego	Drama Series
La pecera de Eva	Telecinco	2010 10 January	Alexandra Jiménez	Sitcom
El pacto	Telecinco	2010-01-10		TV-Movie
Periodistas fútbol club	La Sexta	2010-01-11	Dani Mateo	Sport
Los protegidos	Antena 3	2010-01-12	Antonio Garrido	Drama Series
Matinal Cuatro	Cuatro	2010-01-14	Ana García Siñeriz	Variety Show
La escobilla nacional	Antena 3	2010-01-17	Àngel Llácer	Comedy
¿Quién vive ahí?	La Sexta	2010-01-17		Investigation
Generación ni-ni	La Sexta	2010-01-20		Reality Show
Inocentes,	Telecinco	2010-01-24	Aura Garrido	TV-Movie
Valientes	Cuatro	2010-01-25		Soap Opera
Lo que diga la rubia	Cuatro	2010-01-25	Luján Argüelles	Talk Show
Adolfo Suárez, el presidente	Antena 3	2010-01-26	Ginés García Millán.	TV-Movie
El Reencuentro	Telecinco	2010-02-03	Mercedes Milá	Reality Show
¡Más que baile!	Telecinco	2010-02-10	Pilar Rubio	Talent Show
¡Mira quién mira!	Telecinco	2010-02-10	Tania Llasera	Talk Show
La última guardia	Antena 3	2010-02-10	Concha Cuetos and Carlos Larrañaga	TV-Movie
Fresa Ácida	Telecinco	2010-02-11	Carmen Alcayde	Gossip Show
El club del chiste	Antena 3	2010-02-15	Anabel Alonso	Comedy
Informe 3	Antena 3	2010-02-18	Jaime Cantizano.	
I love Escassi	Telecinco	2010-02-22	Jesús Vázquez	Reality Show
Invisibles	Antena 3	2010-02-28		Docu-drama
Al Ataque Chow	Telecinco	2010-02-28	Paz Padilla	Comedy
La jaula	Antena 3	2010-03-08		Reality Show
Para todos La 2	La 2	2010-03-08	Juanjo Pardo and Montse Tejera.	Variety Show
¡Qué tiempo tan feliz!	Telecinco	2010-03-13	María Teresa Campos	Talk Show
La piel azul	Antena 3	2010-03-13	Miguel Ángel Muñoz	TV-Movie
La gullotina	Telecinco	2010-03-13	Jesús Vázquez	Game Show
El Gordo: una historia verdadera	Antena 3	2010-03-28	Álex Barahona	TV-Movie
Justo a tiempo	Cuatro	2010-04-05	Iñaki López	Game Show
Debate al límite	La Sexta	2010-04-05	Mamen Mendizábal.	Talk Show
Karabudjan	Antena 3	2010-04-06	Hugo Silva	TV-Movie
UAU!	Cuatro	2010-04-12	Santi Millán	Late Night
La Duquesa, TV Movie sobre la vida de	Telecinco	2010-04-13	Irene Visedo and Adriana Ozores	TV-Movie
Gran reserva, da	La 1	2010-04-15	Emilio Gutiérrez Caba and Ángela Molina	Drama Series
Gavilanes,	Antena 3	2010-04-19	Rodolfo Sancho	Soap Opera
Football Crackers	Cuatro	2010-04-23	Nico Abad.	Sport
Quiero cantar	Antena 3	2010-04-25	Jorge Fernández	Talent Show
Cántame una canción	Telecinco	2010-04-27	Pilar Rubio	Talent Show
Malas pulgas	Cuatro	2010-04-30	Borja Capponi	Docu-drama
Cántame cómo pasó	La 1	2010-05-07	Anne Igartiburu	Talent Show
Tonterías las justas	Cuatro	2010-05-03	Florentino Fernández	Comedy
Objetivo: In Touch	Nova	2010-05-10	Rosanna Walls	Youth
3D	Antena 3	2010-05-17	Gloria Serra	Variety Show
Mi reino por un caballo	La 2	2010-05-29		Science/Culture
Fiesta fiesta	Cuatro	2010-05-30		Documentary
Operación Momotombo	Antena 3	2010-06-13	Julio Salinas	Reality Show
Enemigos íntimos	Telecinco	2010-06-15	Santi Acosta	Gossip Show
Infiltrados	Telecinco	2010-06-29	Javier Sardà	Reality Show
Imprescindibles	La 2	2010-07-04		Documentary
La isla de los nominados	Cuatro	2010-07-12	Arturo Valls	Sitcom
Dame una pista	Cuatro	2010-07-13	Luján Argüelles	Quiz Show
Supercharly	Telecinco	2010-07-15	Luis Callejo y Malena Alterio	Sitcom
Las joyas de la corona	Telecinco	2010-07-29	Jordi González y Carmen Lomana	Reality Show
Más allá de la vida	Telecinco	2010-08-10	Jordi González	Reality Show
Vuelo 5022 de Spanair	Telecinco	2010-08-31	Carmelo Gómez and Emma Suárez.	TV-Movie
Fama Revolution	Cuatro	2010-04-6	Paula Vázquez.	Talent Show
¿Qué fue de Jorge Sanz?	Canal+	2010-09-12	Jorge Sanz	Sitcom
Las chicas de oro	La 1	2010-09-13	Concha Velasco, Lola Herrera, Carmen Maura and Alicia Hermida	Sitcom
El marco	Antena 3	2010-09-14	Patricia Gaztañaga.	Reality Show
Alfonso, el príncipe maldito	Telecinco	2010-09-15	José Luis García Pérez	TV-Movie
La mitad invisible	La 2	2010-09-20	Juan Carlos Ortega	Science/Culture
Karlos Arguiñano en tu cocina	Antena 3	2010-09-20	Karlos Arguiñano	Cooking Show
Tu vista favorita	Cuatro	2010-09-20	Nuria Roca	Variety Show
Un país para comérselo	La 1	2010-09-23	Imanol Arias and Juan Echanove	Travel
Tierra de Lobos	Telecinco	2010-09-29	Álex García and María Castro	Drama Series
Raphael: una historia de superación personal	Antena 3	2010-09-29		TV-Movie
Frank de la Jungla	Cuatro	2010-10-03	Frank Cuesta	Documentary
'Humanos y divinos	La 1	2010-10-04	Boris Izaguirre	Talk Show
Todas las mujeres]	TNT	2010-10-04	Eduard Fernández	Drama Series
La princesa de Éboli	Antena 3	2010-10-18	Belén Rueda	TV-Movie
Hispania, la leyenda	Antena 3	2010-10-25	Roberto Enríquez y Ana de Armas	Drama Series
Felipe y Letizia	Telecinco	2010-10-25	Amaia Salamanca	TV-Movie
Museo Coconut	Neox	2010-11-01	Carlos Areces and Joaquín Reyes	Comedy
Impares Premium	Neox	2010-11-09	Guillermo Toledo	Sitcom
Conexión Samanta	Cuatro	2010-11-26	Samanta Villar	Docudrama
Universo Lomana	Telecinco	2010-12-19	Carmen Lomana	Variety Show
Algo pasa con Marta	La Sexta	2010-12-20	Marta Torné	Talk Show

== Television shows ==
- La 1
  - Telediario (1957– )
  - Informe Semanal (1973– )
  - Parlamento (1978–2014)
  - Los Desayunos de TVE (1994–2020)
  - Cine de barrio (1995– )
  - Gente (1995–2011)
  - Corazón (1997– )
  - Cuéntame cómo pasó (2001– )
  - 59 segundos (2004–2012)
  - Destino Eurovisión (2004–2013)
  - Pocoyo (2005– )
  - España Directo (2005–2022)
  - Amar en tiempos revueltos (2005–2012)
  - Tengo una pregunta para usted (2007–2011)
  - Comando actualidad (2008– )
  - Españoles en el mundo (2009 – )
  - La Hora de José Mota (2009–2012)
  - Los misterios de Laura (2009–2014)
  - Águila Roja (2009–2016)
  - La Mañana de La 1 (2009–2020)
- Antena 3
  - Antena 3 Noticias (1990– )
  - Club Megatrix (1995–2013)
  - Espejo público (1996– )
  - ¿Dónde estás, corazón? (2003–2011)
  - La ruleta de la fortuna (2006– )
  - El Diario (2008–2011)
  - Física o Química (2008–2011)
  - Doctor Mateo (2009–2011)
  - Rico al instante (2009–2011)
  - Curso del 63 (2009–2012)
- La 2
  - Al filo de lo imposble (1982– )
  - Pueblo de Dios (1982– )
  - Últimas preguntas (1983– )
  - En portada (1984– )
  - Metrópolis (1985– )
  - Documentos TV (1986– )
  - Tendido cero (1986– )
  - Días de cine (1991– )
  - La Aventura del saber (1992– )
  - Jara y sedal (1992– )
  - La 2 noticias (1994–2020)
  - La noche temática, (1995– )
  - Redes (1996–2013)
  - Agrosfera (1997– )
  - El escarabajo verde (1997– )
  - Saber y ganar (1997– )
  - El Cine de La 2 (1998– )
  - Versión española (1998– )
  - Aquí hay trabajo (2000– )
  - España en comunidad (2000–2020)
  - Shalom (2003– )
  - Palabra por palabra (2005–2011)
  - Cámara abierta 2.0 (2007– )
  - Página 2 (2007– )
  - Tres14 (2007–2014)
  - En lengua de signos (2008– )
  - Zoom tendencias ( 2008– )
  - Fábrica de ideas (2008–2017)
  - RTVE responde (2009– )
- La Sexta
  - El Intermedio (2006– )
  - La Sexta Noticias (2006– )
  - Sé lo que hicisteis...(2006–2011)
  - Buenafuente (2007–2011)
  - Minuto y resultado (2007–2012)
  - Salvados (2008– )
- Cuatro
  - Cuarto milenio (2005– )
  - Callejeros (2005–2014)
  - Noticias Cuatro (2005–2019)
  - El Hormiguero (2006–2011)
  - Supernanny (2006–2017)
  - Las mañanas de Cuatro (2006–2018)
  - Desafío extremo (2007–2014)
  - Fama, ¡a bailar! (2008–2011)
  - Pekín Express (2008–2011)
  - Perdidos en la tribu (2009–2012)
  - Callejeros viajeros (2009–2013)
  - 21 días (2009–2016)
  - Hermano mayor (2009–2017)
  - Granjero busca esposa (2009–2018)
- Telecinco
  - Informativos Telecinco (1990– )
  - Nosolomúsica (1999–2012)
  - Survivor Spain (2000– )
  - Hospital Central (2000–2012)
  - Big Brother Spain (2000–2017)
  - Operación Triunfo (2005–2011)
  - Diario de (2004–2011)
  - Gran Hermano VIP (2004–2019)
  - El Programa de Ana Rosa (2005– )
  - Bricomanía (2005–2010)
  - Decogarden (2005–2010)
  - Aída (2005–2014)
  - Pasapalabra (2007–2019)
  - Survivor Spain (2006– )
  - La que se avecina (2007– )
  - Hormigas blancas (2007–2011)
  - La Noria (2007–2012)
  - Pasapalabra (2007–2019)
  - Tú sí que vales (2008–2013)
  - I love TV (2008–2015)
  - Mujeres y Hombres y Viceversa (2008–2018)
  - Sálvame (2009– )
  - Deluxe (2009– )
  - Vuélveme loca (2009–2012)
  - De buena ley (2009–2014)
  - ¡Qué tiempo tan feliz! (2009–2017)

== Ending this year ==
- La 1
  - Corazón, Corazón (1993–2010)
  - En noches como ésta (2008–2010)
  - La Lista (2008–2010)
- La 2
  - Zona ACB (1993–2010)
  - Padres en apuros (2003–2010)
  - Muchachada Nui (2007–2010)
  - Pelotas (2009–2010)
  - ¿Y ahora qué...? (2009–2010)
- Antena 3
  - Los Hombres de Paco (2005–2010)
  - Esta casa era una ruina (2007–2010)
  - El Internado (2007–2010)
  - Locos por la tele (2007–2010)
  - Tal cual lo contamos (2008–2010)
  - Ven a cenar conmigo (2008–2010)
  - A fondo: Zona cero (2009–2010)
  - Padres (2009–2010)
  - Pánico en el plató (2009–2010)
- Cuatro
  - Ola Ola (2008–2010)
  - Password (2008–2010)
  - Hay alguien ahí (2009–2010)
  - Vaya tropa (2009–2010)
- Telecinco
  - Karlos Arguiñano en tu cocina (2004–2010)
  - Escenas de Matrimonio (2007–2010)
  - El Juego de tu vida (2008–2010)
  - Acusados (2009–2010)
  - Boing (2009–2010)
  - InvestigaciónXpress (2009–2010)
  - Mientras duermes (2009–2010)
  - Toma cero y a jugar... (2009–2010)
- La Sexta
  - Que vida más triste (2008–2010)
  - La Tira Comedia (2008–2010)

== Changes of network affiliation ==
Show	Moved From	Moved To
Bricomanía (1994–2020)	Telecinco	Antena 3
Caiga quien caiga (1996–2010)	La Sexta	Cuatro
Decogarden (2001–2020)	Telecinco	Antena 3
Los Lunnis (2003– )	La 2	Clan
Diario de (2004–2014)	Telecinco	Cuatro
Pocoyo (2005– )	La 2	La 1

== Deaths ==
- 25 February – Rafael de Penagos, 86, voice actor.
- 15 March – Blanca Sendino, 83, actress.
- 11 April – Juan Manuel Gozalo, 65 periodista deportivo.
- 14 April – Vicente Haro, 79, actor.
- 30 April – Jordi Estadella, 61, host and voice actor.
- 12 May – Antonio Ozores, 81, actor.
- 20 June – Covadonga Cadenas, 64, actress.
- 26 July – Antonio Gamero, 76, actor.
- 24 August – Eugenia Roca, 82, actress.
- 7 September – Joaquín Soler Serrano, 91, journalist.
- 19 September – José Antonio Labordeta, 75, singer and host.
- 12 October – Manuel Alexandre, 92, actor.
- 13 October – Alberto Oliveras, 80, host.
- 26 October – Llàtzer Escarceller, 96, actor.
- 25 December – Asunción Villamil, 83, actress.
- 27 December – Luis Mariñas, 63, journalist.

== See also ==
- 2010 in Spain
- List of Spanish films of 2010
