= 2014 in Spanish television =

This is a list of Spanish television related events from 2014.

== Events ==
- 1 January – Animax stops broadcasting.
- 7 February – MTV España becomes a Pay television service under satellite broadcasting platform Canal+.
- 13 February – Intereconomía TV, owned by Intereconomía Corporation, becomes a Pay television, excluding Madrid and Valencia where it keeps broadcasting free-to-air.
- 23 February – La Sexta broadcast the Pseudo-documentary Operación Palace, directed by Jordi Évole, about the 1981 Spanish coup d'état attempt, and becomes the most viewed non-sport show in the channel history, with 5,2 million views and 23.9% of share.
- 2 March – La 1 broadcasts a documentary about rares diseases hosted by Isabel Gemio, with Crowdfunding aims, getting 1,2 Million euros.
- 6 May – Spanish TV Channels Xplora, Nitro, La Sexta 3, LaSiete and Nueve close down after a Supreme Court of Spain warrant.
- 25 September – Leopoldo González-Echenique resigns as Chairman of RTVE.
- 2 October - TV channel A&E starts broadcasting, replacing The Biography Channel.
- 23 October – José Antonio Sánchez Domínguez is appointed Chairman of RTVE.
- 29 October –
  - Julio Somoano is replaced by José Antonio Álvarez Gundín as Head of the News Department in Televisión Española.
  - Television channel ETB 4 starts broadcasting.
- 24 December – First Royal Christmas Message of the new King of Spain Felipe VI with 8,2 million views and 73.4% of share.

== Debuts ==
Title	Channel	Debut	Performers/Host	Genre
Deja sitio para el postre	Cuatro	2014-01-03	Raquel Sánchez-Silva	Cooking Show
Un cuento de Navidad	La 1	2014-01-04	Pere Ponce	TV-Movie
El Chiringuito de Jugones	Nitro	2014-01-06	Josep Pedrerol	Sport
Bienvenidos al Lolita	Antena 3	2014-01-07	Beatriz Carvajal and Natalia Verbeke	Drama Series
Vicente Ferrer	La 1	2014-01-09	Imanol Arias	TV-Movie
El método Osmin	Cuatro	2014-01-10	Osmin Hernández	Docureality
Tengo once años	La 2	2014-01-12		Public Service
La diana de...	Antena 3	2014-01-14	Gloria Serra	Investigation
Ochéntame otra vez	La 1	2014-01-16		Documentary
Negocios al límite	Cuatro	2014-01-19	Beatriz de la Iglesia	Docureality
Romeo y Julieta	Telecinco	2014-01-21	Martiño Rivas and Alessandra Mastronardi	Miniseries
El corazón del océano	Antena 3	2014-01-27	Hugo Silva and Clara Lago	Drama Series
UAP: Unidad de Análisis Policial	Antena 3	2014-01-27	Carolina Selles	Investigation
Ana Karenina	Telecinco	2014-01-28	Ángela Molina	TV-Movie
Cumbres	La 2	2014-02-02	Edurne Pasabán	Sport
Cocineros españoles por el mundo	La Sexta	2014-02-03		Cooking Show
El Príncipe	Telecinco	2014-02-04	Álex González, Hiba Abouk and José Coronado	Drama Series
La Voz Kids	Telecinco	2014-02-06	Jesús Vázquez and Tania Llasera	Talent Show
Alaska y Coronas	La 2	2014-02-12	Olvido Gara and Javier Coronas	Talk Show
B&b, de boca en boca	Telecinco	2014-02-17	Belén Rueda and Gonzalo de Castro	Drama Series
Velvet	Antena 3	2014-02-17	Paula Echevarría and Miguel Ángel Silvestre	Soap Opera
Policía internacional	Cuatro	2014-02-18		Docureality
Viajando con Chester	Cuatro	2014-02-23	Risto Mejide	Talk Show
¡A bailar!	Antena 3	2014-03-04	Mónica Naranjo	Talent Show
Concepción Arenal, la visitadora de cárceles	La 1	2014-03-08	Blanca Portillo	TV-Movie
Ciega a citas	Cuatro	2014-03-10	Teresa Hurtado de Ory and Álex Gadea	Soap Opera
Mi madre cocina mejor que la tuya	Cuatro	2014-03-17		Cooking Show
Entre rejas	Cuatro	2014-03-18		Docureality
Dreamland	Cuatro	2014-03-28	Christian Sánchez	Music
El jefe infiltrado	La Sexta	2014-04-03		Docureality
Hable con ellas	Telecinco	2014-04-08	S.Barneda, N.Millán, B.Motañez, Y.Ramos and A.Eckamnn	Talk Show
Cocina2	La 1	2014-04-09	Hermanos Torres	Cooking Show
Planeta Calleja	Cuatro	2014-04-13	Jesús Calleja	Documentary
Rescatando a Sara	Antena 3	2014-04-22	Carmen Machi and Fernando Guillén Cuervo	Miniseries
Millennium	La 2	2014-05-11	Ramón Colom	Science/Culture
Wild Frank	Discovery Max	2014-05-11	Frank Cuesta	Documentary
Sin identidad	Antena 3	2014-05-13	Megan Montaner	Drama Series
Ciento y la madre	Cuatro	2014-05-15	Patricia Conde	Comedy
Aquí la Tierra	La 1	2014-05-27	Jacob Petrus	Variety Show
Cazamariposas VIP	Telecinco	2014-06-04	Nuria Marín Font	Gossip Show
El pueblo más divertido	La 1	2014-06-09	Mariló Montero and Millán Salcedo	Game Show
Chiringuito de Pepe	Telecinco	2014-06-09	Santi Millán and Blanca Portillo	Sitcom
Todo va bien	Cuatro	2014-06-23	Xavi Rodríguez and Edurne	Variety Show
Ex, ¿qué harías por tus hijos?	Telecinco	2014-06-26	Emma García	Reality Show
En la caja	Cuatro	2014-06-29	Pedro García Aguado	Reality Show
Vivan los bares	La 1	2014-07-11	Lorena Castell and Juanito Makandé	Variety Show
Capitán Q	La 1	2014-07-15	Quico Taronjí	Documentary
Fogones lejanos	Cuatro	2014-07-20		Cooking Show
Cazamariposas XXL	Telecinco	2014-07-31	Ares Teixidó and Enric Company	Gossip Show
Asamblea Fashion by Cazamariposas	Divinity	2014-08-05	Nuria Chavero	Gossip Show
La goleada	13TV	2014-08-24	Felipe del Campo	Sport
Partido a partido	Cuatro	2014-08-30	Manu Carreño	Sport
Amigas y conocidas	La 1	2014-09-02	Inés Ballester	Talk Show
El valor de las mujeres	Telecinco	2014-09-06		Movies
Pequeños gigantes	Telecinco	2014-09-09	Jesús Vázquez	Game Show
¡Boom!	Antena 3	2014-09-09	Juanra Bonet	Quiz Show
Cabo Vadillo00	Cuatro	2014-09-09	Pablo Vadillo	Docureality
Descalzo sobre la tierra roja	La 1	2014-09-09		TV-Movie
Tu cara me suena mini	Antena 3	2014-09-11	Manel Fuentes	Talent Show
La otra red	Cuatro	2014-09-12	Javier Ruiz Pérez	News Magazine
T con T	La 1	2014-09-15	Toñi Moreno	Variety Show
Hermanos	Telecinco	2014-09-16	María Valverde and Álvaro Cervantes	Miniseries
Amores que duelen	Telecinco	2014-09-16	Roberto Arce	Reality Show
Pecadores Impequeibols	La 2	2014-09-21	Antonio Fraguas «Forges»	Variety Show
Viviendo el mar	La 1	2014-09-23		Documentary
Planeta comida	La 1	2014-09-27		Travel
Robin Food	Telecinco	2014-09-29	David de Jorge and Martín Berasategui	Cooking Show
Los viernes al show	Antena 3	2014-10-10	Arturo Valls and Manel Fuentes	Comedy
Doraemond Land	Boing	2014-10-10	Laura Artolachipi	Children
¿Quién manda aquí?	La 1	2014-10-12	Javier Estrada	Game Show
Adán y Eva	Cuatro	2014-10-21	Mónica Martínez	Dating Show
Un tiempo nuevo	Telecinco	2014-19-25	Sandra Barneda	Variety Show
Gira	La 1	2014-10-26		Docureality
El Rey	Telecinco	2014-10-28	Fernando Gil	Miniseries
Tapas y barras	Telecinco	2014-11-01	Mario Sandoval	Cooking Show
Killer Karaoke	Cuatro	2014-11-05	Patricia Conde and Florentino Fernández	Talent Show
Más que en vivo	La 2	2014-11-08	Berta Collado	Docureality
Cuéntame un cuento	Antena 3	2014-11-10		Miniseries
Coca Cola Music Experience	Cuatro	2014-11-22	Tony Aguilar	Music
Los reyes del empeño	LaSexta	2014-11-24	Marta Torres	Docureality
Este país merece la pena	Telecinco	2014-11-30	Miguel Ángel Revilla	Travel
Órbita Laika	La 2	2014-12-07	Ángel Martín	Science/Culture
Música ligerísima	La 2	2014-12-08		Music
Prim, el asesinato de la calle del Turco	La 1	2014-12-15	Francesc Orella	TV-Movie
Gym Tony	Cuatro	2014-12-17	Ivan Massagué and Antonia San Juan	Sitcom
Fuera de clase	La 1	2014-12-22	David Bustamante	Talent Show

== Television shows ==
- La 1
  - Telediario (1957– )
  - Informe Semanal (1973– )
  - Telepasión española (1990– )
  - Los Desayunos de TVE (1994–2020)
  - Cine de barrio (1995– )
  - Corazón (1997– )
  - Cuéntame cómo pasó (2001– )
  - España Directo (2005–2022)
  - Comando actualidad (2008– )
  - Españoles en el mundo (2009 – )
  - Águila Roja (2009–2016)
  - La Mañana de La 1 (2009–2020)
  - Audiencia abierta (2012– )
  - Flash Moda (2012– )
  - Cocina con Sergio (2012–2015)
  - El Debate de la 1 (2012–2017)
  - MasterChef (2013– )
  - MasterChef Junior (2013– )
  - Viaje al centro de la tele (2013– )
  - Fabricando: Made in Spain (2013–2015)
- Telecinco
  - Informativos Telecinco (1990– )
  - Survivor Spain (2000– )
  - Big Brother Spain (2000–2017)
  - Gran Hermano VIP (2004–2019)
  - El Programa de Ana Rosa (2005– )
  - Pasapalabra (2007–2019)
  - Survivor Spain (2006– )
  - La que se avecina (2007– )
  - Pasapalabra (2007–2019)
  - I love TV (2008–2015)
  - Mujeres y Hombres y Viceversa (2008–2018)
  - Sálvame (2009– )
  - Deluxe (2009– )
  - ¡Qué tiempo tan feliz! (2009–2017)
  - Hay una cosa que te quiero decir (2012–2015)
  - La Voz (2012–2017)
- La 2
  - Al filo de lo imposble (1982– )
  - Pueblo de Dios (1982– )
  - Últimas preguntas (1983– )
  - En portada (1984– )
  - Metrópolis (1985– )
  - Documentos TV (1986– )
  - Tendido cero (1986– )
  - Días de cine (1991– )
  - La Aventura del saber (1992– )
  - Jara y sedal (1992– )
  - La 2 noticias (1994–2020)
  - La noche temática, (1995– )
  - Agrosfera (1997– )
  - El escarabajo verde (1997– )
  - Saber y ganar (1997– )
  - El Cine de La 2 (1998– )
  - Versión española (1998– )
  - Aquí hay trabajo (2000– )
  - España en comunidad (2000–2020)
  - Shalom (2003– )
  - Cámara abierta 2.0 (2007– )
  - Página 2 (2007– )
  - En lengua de signos (2008– )
  - Zoom tendencias ( 2008– )
  - Fábrica de ideas (2008–2017)
  - RTVE responde (2009– )
  - Imprescindibles (2010– )
  - Para todos la Dos (2010– )
  - Mitad invisible, La (2010–2016)
  - Cómo nos reímos (2012– )
  - ¡Atención obras! (2013– )
  - Cachitos de hierro y cromo (2013– )
- Antena 3
  - Antena 3 Noticias (1990– )
  - Espejo público (1996– )
  - La ruleta de la fortuna (2006– )
  - Karlos Arguiñano en tu cocina (2010– )
  - Tu cara me suena (2011– )
  - El Hormiguero (2011– )
  - El secreto de Puente Viejo (2011–2020)
  - ¡Ahora caigo! (2011–2021)
  - Centímetros cúblicos (2012– )
  - Amar es para siempre22 (2013– )
  - Me resbala (2013–2021)
  - Top Chef (2013–2017)
- La Sexta
  - El Intermedio (2006– )
  - La Sexta Noticias (2006– )
  - Salvados (2008– )
  - Al rojo vivo (2011– )
  - La Sexta columna (2012– )
  - Más vale tarde (2012– )
  - Pesadilla en la cocina (2012–2020)
  - Equipo de investigación (2013– )
  - Jugones (2013– )
  - El objetivo (2013–2022)
  - Zapeando (2013– )
  - Policías en acción (2013–2016)
  - La Sexta noche (2013–2022)
- Cuatro
  - Cuarto milenio (2005– )
  - Noticias Cuatro (2005–2019)
  - Supernanny (2006–2017)
  - Las mañanas de Cuatro (2006–2018)
  - 21 días (2009–2016)
  - Hermano mayor (2009–2017)
  - Granjero busca esposa (2009–2018)
  - Conexión Samanta (2010–2016)
  - ¿Quién quiere casarse con mi hijo? (2012–2017)

== Ending this year ==
- La 1
  - Los misterios de Laura (2009–2014)
  - Un País para comérselo (2010–2014)
  - El alma de las empresas (2013–2014)
  - Entre todos (2013–2014)
  - Tu oportunidad (2013–2014)
- Telecinco
  - Aída (2005–2014)
  - De buena ley (2009–2014)
  - Abre los ojos... y mira (2013–2014)
  - ¡Mira quién salta! (2013–2014)
  - Se enciende la noche (2013–2014)
- Antena 3
  - Atrapa un millón (2011–2014)
  - Con el culo al aire (2012–2014)
  - The Time in Between (2013–2014)
  - Vive cantando (2013–2014)
- La 2
  - Tres14 (2007–2014)
  - Efecto ciudadano (2013–2014)
  - Fiesta suprema (2013–2014)
- La Sexta
  - Lab: Tal como somos (2013–2014)
  - Top Trending Tele (2013–2014)
  - En el aire (2013–2015)
- Cuatro
  - Callejeros (2005–2014)
  - Desafío extremo (2007–2014)
  - Diario de (2010–2014)
  - Inteligencia artificial (2013–2014)
  - Natural Frank (2013–2014)
  - ¿Quién quiere casarse con mi madre? (2013–2014)
  - Tiki-Taka (2013–2014)
  - Un príncipe para... (2013–2014)
  - La incubadora de los negocios (2013– 2014)

== Changes of network affiliation ==
Show	Moved From	Moved To
Parlamento (1978– )	La 1	Canal 24 Horas
Amar en tiempos revueltos/Amar es para siempre (2005– )	La 1	Antena 3
Mira quién baila (2005–2014)	Telecinco	La 1
El chiringuito de Jugones (2014– )	Nitro	La Sexta
El chiringuito de Jugones (2014– )	La Sexta	Neox

== Deaths ==
- 22 January – Manu Leguineche, writer and journalist, 72.
- 6 February – Tatiana Sisquella, journalist, 35.
- 24 February – Juan José Plans, writer and journalist, 70.
- 28 February – Dunia Ayaso, director and writer, 53.
- 2 April – Alfonso Bayard, actor, 47.
- 3 April – Pere Ventura, actor, 54.
- 21 April – Ramón Pons, actor, 73.
- 6 June – Darío Barrio, chef and host, 42.
- 4 July – Carmen Hornillos, hostess and journalist, 52.
- 20 July – Álex Angulo, actor, 61.
- 29 July – María Antonia Iglesias, journalist, 69.
- 28 August – Roberto Cairo, actor, 51.
- 2 September – Daniel Dicenta, actor, 76.
- 3 September – Miguel Alcobendas, director, 74.
- 2 October – Pedro Peña, actor, 88.
- 4 October – Joan Molina, actor, 73.
- 15 November – Emiliano Redondo, actor, 77.
- 16 November – Josep Maria Bachs, host, 70.
- 19 November – Koldo Losada, actor, 54.

== See also ==
- 2014 in Spain
- List of Spanish films of 2014
