= 2012 in Spanish television =

This is a list of Spanish television related events from 2012.

== Events ==
- 9 January – New TV Channel Energy is launched.
- 12 January - Channel Discovery Max, starts broadcasting.
- 29 February - TV channel Canal 4 Navarra stops broadcasting.
- 30 March - Paramount Channel, new TV Channel is launched.
- 20 April – Spanish Council of Ministers passes a new Royal Decree-Law in order to render the public channels management easier.
- 1 May –
  - New TV Channel Xplora starts broadcasting.
  - TV channel La Sexta 2 stops broadcasting.
- 29 June: Leopoldo González-Echenique is appointed chairman of Radio Televisión Española.
- 1 July – Broadcasting of UEFA Euro 2012 Final by Telecinco rates 83,4% of share with 15,4 million viewers.
- August: TV channel Canal+ Liga de Campeones starts broadcasting.
- 1 October – The Companies Grupo Antena 3 and Gestora de Inversiones Audiovisuales La Sexta merge creating a new group called Atresmedia.
- 31 December – New TV Channel Nueve, is launched.

== Debuts ==
Title	Channel	Debut	Performers/Host	Genre
Climas extremos	La 1	2012-01-03	Mario Picazo	Science/Culture
Toledo, cruce de destinos	Antena 3	2012-01-10	Juan Diego	Drama Series
La fuga	Telecinco	2012-01-11	María Valverde	Drama Series
El gran debate	Telecinco	2012-01-14	Jordi González and Sandra Barneda	Talk Show
Materia reservada	Telecinco	2012-01-25	Santi Acosta	Variety Show
La sexta columna	La Sexta	2012-01-27	Antonio García Ferreras	Investigation
¿Quién quiere casarse con mi hijo?	Cuatro	2012-01-30	Luján Argüelles	Dating Show
Con el culo al aire	La 1	2012-02-01	Paco Tous and Toni Acosta	Sitcom
El cubo	Cuatro	2012-02-09	Raquel Sánchez Silva	Quiz Show
El millonario	La Sexta	2012-02-15	Nuria Roca	Quiz Show
Mi gitana	Telecinco	2012-03-05	Eva Marciel	Miniseries
El número uno	Antena 3	2012-03-26	Paula Vázquez	Talent Show
Luna, el misterio de Calenda	Antena 3	2012-04-10	Belén Rueda	Drama Series
El debate de La 1	La 1	2012-04-11	María Casado	Talk Show
La nube	La 2	2012-04-12	Toni Garrido	Science/Culture
Buenas noches y Buenafuente	Antena 3	2012-04-15	Andreu Buenafuente	Late Night
Centímetros cúbicos	Nitro	2012-04-15	Javier Reyero	Sport
Carmina	Telecinco	2012-04-18		TV-Movie
Hay una cosa que te quiero decir]	Telecinco	2012-04-24	Jorge Javier Vázquez	Talk Show
Avanti ¡que pase el siguiente!	Antena 3	2012-04-27	Carlos Sobera and Angy Fernández	Quiz Show
Usted perdone	Antena 3	2012-04-29	Javier Sardà	Talk Show
¿Conoces España?	La 1	2012-05-07	Ramón García	Quiz Show
Entrevista a la carta	La 1	2012-05-28	Julia Otero	Talk Show
Cocina con Sergio	La 1	2012-06-09	Sergio Fernández Luque	Cooking Show
Todo el mundo es bueno	Telecinco	2012-06-25	José Corbacho and Pilar Rubio	Comedy
Solo moda	La 1	2012-06-30	Nieves Álvarez	Variety Show
Dando la nota	Antena 3	2012-07-05	Jaime Cantizano	Music
Lo sabe, no lo sabe	Cuatro	2012-07-30	Juanra Bonet	Quiz Show
Frágiles	Telecinco	2012-08-02	Santi Millán	Sitcom
Nada es igual	Telecinco	2012-08-07	Emma García	Variety Show
Imperium	Antena 3	2012-09-05	José Sancho	Drama Series
Cómo nos reímos	La 2	2012-09-08		Comedy
Isabel	La 1	2012-09-10	Michelle Jenner	Drama Series
Stamos okupa2	La 1	2012-09-14	Carmen Maura.	Sitcom
La voz	Telecinco	2012-09-19	Jesús Vázquez	Talent Show
Te lo mereces	Antena 3	2012-09-21	Paula Vázquez and Roberto Leal	Game Show
Padres lejanos	Cuatro	2012-09-23	Manuel Díaz González	Reality Show
Las tardes de Cuatro	Cuatro	2012-10-01	Marta Fernández	Variety Show
Audiencia abierta	La 1	2012-10-13	Ángeles Bravo	Variety Show
Gandía Shore	MTV	2012-10-14		Reality Show
Señoras que...	Neox	2012-10-18	Josema Yuste	Sitcom
Pesadilla en la cocina	La Sexta	2012-10-25	Alberto Chicote	Cooking Show
Más vale tarde	La Sexta	2012-10-29	Mamen Mendizábal	News Magazine
Alguien tenía que decirlo	La Sexta	2012-11-12	Dani Rovira and David Broncano	Comedy
Cocineros sin estrella	Telecinco	2012-11-18	José Ribagorda	Cooking Show
Te vas a enterar	Cuatro	2012-11-26	Jesús Gallego and Álvaro de la Lama	News Magazine
Fenómenos	Antena 3	2012-11-27	Julián López, Ana Polvorosa and Alejo Sauras	Sitcom

== Television shows ==
- La 1
  - Telediario (1957- )
  - Informe Semanal (1973- )
  - Parlamento (1978-2014)
  - Los Desayunos de TVE (1994-2020)
  - Cine de barrio (1995- )
  - Corazón (1997- )
  - Cuéntame cómo pasó (2001- )
  - Destino Eurovisión (2004-2013)
  - Comando actualidad (2008- )
  - Españoles en el mundo (2009 - )
  - Los misterios de Laura (2009-2014)
  - Águila Roja (2009-2016)
  - La Mañana de La 1 (2009-2020)
  - Gran reserva (2010-2013)
  - Un País para comérselo (2010-2014)
  - +Gente (2011-2013)
- Antena 3
  - Antena 3 Noticias (1990- )
  - Club Megatrix (1995-2013)
  - Espejo público (1996- )
  - La ruleta de la fortuna (2006- )
  - Karlos Arguiñano en tu cocina (2010- )
  - El Club del Chiste (2010-2013)
  - Tu cara me suena (2011- )
  - El Hormiguero (2011- )
  - El Barco (2011-2013)
  - Equipo de investigación (2011-2013)
  - Gran Hotel (2011-2013)
  - Atrapa un millón (2011-2014)
  - El secreto de Puente Viejo (2011-2020)
  - ¡Ahora caigo! (2011-2021)
- La 2
  - Al filo de lo imposble (1982- )
  - Pueblo de Dios (1982- )
  - Últimas preguntas (1983- )
  - En portada (1984- )
  - Metrópolis (1985- )
  - Documentos TV (1986- )
  - Tendido cero (1986- )
  - Días de cine (1991- )
  - La Aventura del saber (1992- )
  - Jara y sedal (1992- )
  - La 2 noticias (1994-2020)
  - La noche temática, (1995- )
  - Redes (1996-2013)
  - Agrosfera (1997- )
  - El escarabajo verde (1997- )
  - Saber y ganar (1997- )
  - El Cine de La 2 (1998- )
  - Versión española (1998- )
  - Aquí hay trabajo (2000- )
  - España en comunidad (2000-2020)
  - Shalom (2003- )
  - Cámara abierta 2.0 (2007- )
  - Página 2 (2007- )
  - Tres14 (2007-2014)
  - En lengua de signos (2008- )
  - Zoom tendencias ( 2008- )
  - Fábrica de ideas (2008-2017)
  - RTVE responde (2009- )
  - Imprescindibles (2010- )
  - Para todos la Dos (2010- )
  - Mi reino por un caballo (2010-2013)
  - Mitad invisible, La (2010-2016)
- La Sexta
  - El Intermedio (2006- )
  - La Sexta Noticias (2006- )
  - Salvados (2008- )
  - Al rojo vivo (2011- )
- Cuatro
  - Cuarto milenio (2005- )
  - Callejeros (2005-2014)
  - Noticias Cuatro (2005-2019)
  - Supernanny (2006-2017)
  - Las mañanas de Cuatro (2006-2018)
  - Desafío extremo (2007-2014)
  - Callejeros viajeros (2009 - 2013)
  - 21 días (2009-2016)
  - Hermano mayor (2009-2017)
  - Granjero busca esposa (2009-2018)
  - Diario de (2010-2014)
  - Frank de la jungla (2010-2013)
  - Conexión Samanta (2010–2016)
  - Me cambio de familia (2011-2013)
  - Perdidos en la ciudad (2011-2013)
- Telecinco
  - Informativos Telecinco (1990- )
  - Survivor Spain (2000- )
  - Big Brother Spain (2000-2017)
  - Gran Hermano VIP (2004-2019)
  - El Programa de Ana Rosa (2005- )
  - Aída (2005-2014)
  - Pasapalabra (2007-2019)
  - Survivor Spain (2006- )
  - La que se avecina (2007- )
  - Pasapalabra (2007-2019)
  - Tú sí que vales (2008-2013)
  - I love TV (2008-2015)
  - Mujeres y Hombres y Viceversa (2008-2018)
  - Sálvame (2009- )
  - Deluxe (2009- )
  - De buena ley (2009-2014)
  - ¡Qué tiempo tan feliz! (2009-2017)

== Ending this year ==
- La 1
  - 59 segundos (2004-2012)
  - Amar en tiempos revueltos (2005-2012)
  - La Hora de José Mota (2009-2012)
- Antena 3
  - Curso del 63 (2009-2012)
  - Hispania, la leyenda (2010-2012)
  - Maneras de vivir (2010-2012)
  - Los Protegidos (2010-2012)
  - Bandolera (2011-2012)
  - Marco, la historia de un niño (2011-2012)
- La 2
  - En La 2 (2010-2012)
  - Buscamundos (2011-2012)
  - Solo moda (2011-2012)
- Telecinco
  - Nosolomúsica (1999-2012)
  - Hospital Central (2000-2012)
  - La Noria (2007-2012)
  - Vuélveme loca (2009-2012)
  - Parejología 3x22 (2011-2012)
- Cuatro
  - Perdidos en la tribu (2009-2012)
  - Malas pulgas (2010–2012)
  - Dale al REC (2011-2012)
  - Salta a la vista (2011-2012)
  - La selva en casa (2011-2012)
  - Uno para ganar (2011-2012)
- La Sexta
  - Minuto y resultado (2007-2012)

== Changes of network affiliation ==
¿Quién quiere ser millonario? (1999- )	Antena 3	La Sexta

== Deaths ==
- 1 March - Quique Camoiras, actor, 84.
- 15 March - Pepe Rubio, actor, 80.
- 17 March - Paco Valladares, actor, 76.
- 5 April - César Abeytua, director, 64.
- 11 April - Marisa Medina, hostess, 69.
- 14 April - Pedro Macía, host, 68.
- 26 April - Yolanda Ríos, actress, 60.
- 22 June - Juan Luis Galiardo, actor, 72.
- 26 June - Gustavo Pérez Puig, director, 71.
- 5 July - Pedro Rodríguez Gómez, director and producer, 43.
- 23 July - José Luis Uribarri, host, 75.
- 23 July - Paco Morán, actor, 81.
- 9 August - Sancho Gracia, actor, 75.
- 30 August - Carlos Larrañaga, actor, 75.
- 13 September - Pablo Sanz, actor, 80.
- 13 November - Carmen Martínez Sierra, actress, 108.
- 18 November - Emilio Aragón Miliki, clown, 83.
- 24 November - Tony Leblanc, actor and director, 90.

== See also ==
- 2012 in Spain
- List of Spanish films of 2012
