= The Refugees (TV series) =

- Also known as: Refugiados
- Genre: Drama
- Created by: Ramón Campos; Gema R. Neira; Cristóbal Garrido; Adolfo Valor
- Starring: Natalia Tena; Will Keen; David Leon; Dafne Keen; Ken Appledorn; Jonathan Mellor
- Countries of origin: Spain; United Kingdom
- Original language: English
- No. of series: 1
- No. of episodes: 8

Production
- Production companies: BBC Worldwide; Atresmedia; Bambú Producciones

Original release
- Network: laSexta
- Release: May 7 – June 15, 2015

The Refugees is a 2015 drama television series created by Ramón Campos, Gema R. Neira, Cristóbal Garrido and Adolfo Valor. The series is a joint production of BBC Worldwide and Atresmedia that premiered on laSexta on 7 May 2015. It shows a rural community faced with millions of refugees from the future seeking shelter in the present.

== Overview ==
Mankind is suffering the biggest exodus in history. Three billion people from the future have travelled to the present to escape from an imminent global disaster: a deadly mutation of a cold virus. All the refugees must obey two rules: they must not talk about the future and they must not contact their families.

The arrival of the refugees takes everyone by surprise, including the Cruz family. The series centres on their story, the story of Samuel, Emma and little Ani. A shift in their existence after the arrival of a mysterious refugee, Alex, who has an incredible mission that will change their lives, and in order to accomplish his mission, he will not hesitate to do whatever there is to be done: including breaking the rules.

== Cast ==
The following is a list of cast members from the series:

- Natalia Tena as Emma Oliver
- Will Keen as Samuel "Sam" Cruz
- David Leon as Alex
- Dafne Keen as Ana "Ani" Cruz Oliver
- Ken Appledorn as Luis
- Jonathan Mellor as Óscar
- Charlotte Vega as Sofía
- Gillian Apter as Gloria
- Morgan Symes as Victor
- Benjamin Nathan-Serio as Cristian
- Gary Piquer as Hugo
- Brendan Price as Félix
- Summer Gibbins as Sara
- Julius Cotter as Man

== Production ==
The television series is a BBC Worldwide and Atresmedia co-production with Bambú Producciones. Filming began in summer 2014.

== Episodes ==
In Spain, the first and second episodes of The Refugees were broadcast simultaneously the same day on four television channels (Neox, Nova, laSexta and Antena 3) of Atresmedia. The premiere of The Refugees was watched by 4.37 million viewers. The rest of episodes aired on laSexta.

No.	Title	Directed by	Original release date	Spain viewers (millions)
1	"The Exodus"	David Pinillos	May 7, 2015	4.37
2	"The Siege"	David Pinillos	May 7, 2015	4.37
3	"The Wait"	David Pinillos	May 14, 2015	1.81
4	"The Sacrifice"	David Pinillos	May 21, 2015	1.175
5	"Alone"	David Pinillos	May 25, 2015	1.175
6	"The Truth"	León Siminiani	June 1, 2015	1.175
7	"Sara"	León Siminiani	June 8, 2015	1.258
8	"A New Beginning"	David Pinillos	June 15, 2015	1.131

== See also ==
- The 4400 and 4400 - A ball of light deposits a group of 4400 people who vanished without a trace over the last century, having not aged a single day and with no memory of what happened to them.
- The Crossing - Refugees fleeing a war seek asylum in an American town—but they claim to be from America, 180 years in the future.
- Beforeigners - A "time migration" occurs all over the world, with people from the Stone Age, Viking Age, and the 19th century. Set in Oslo.
- Goobacks, an episode of South Park, where impoverished refugees from the future arrive in the town.
