= Mega (Spanish TV channel) =

Spanish television channel

- Country: Spain
- Broadcast area: Spain, reaching bordering regions via overspill of the Spanish terrestrial network

Programming
- Language: Spanish
- Picture format: 1080i HDTV

Ownership
- Owner: Atresmedia
- Sister channels: Antena 3 LaSexta; Neox; Nova; Atreseries

History
- Launched: July 1, 2015

Links
- Website: mega.atresmedia.com

Availability

Terrestrial
- Digital: Mux 69

Mega is a Spanish television channel owned by Atresmedia. Its programming is aimed towards a male audience.

The network is available on digital terrestrial television (TDT as it is known in Spain) as well as cable and satellite.

== History ==
On May 6, 2014, Atresmedia was forced to close Nitro, Xplora and la Sexta 3 channels due to a supreme court ruling, so the programming aimed at the male audience had to be placed on other group channels such as Neox or LaSexta. After this event, Atresmedia sought to recover the license that was leased to Gol Televisión, setting the end of 2015 as a limit.

In May 2015, Atresmedia and Mediapro signed the rescission of the frequency rental agreement, since Mediapro would launch a new channel in association with BeIn Sports, so Gol Televisión would stop broadcasting. During June 2015, Gol Televisión broadcast free-to-air for a few hours to promote the new channel, ending its broadcasts on June 30, which also meant the end of pay DTT in Spain.

After recovering the frequency, Atresmedia announced that the new channel would be called Mega, finally, the channel began broadcasting on July 1, 2015.

== Programming ==
Mega's programming is aimed at a male audience, including series, action movies, factuals, documentaries and reality television, as well as sports talk shows such as El Chiringuito de Jugones and the retransmission of programs that had been broadcast on Antena 3 and La Sexta. Most of the documentaries, factuals and reality shows broadcast on Mega are produced by The History Channel.
