= List of longest-running Spanish television series =

This is a list of the longest-running television series in Spain.

Name	Channel	First broadcast	Last broadcast	Length
Telediario	TVE-1	1957	Present	68 years, 191 days
Informe Semanal	TVE-1	1973	Present	52 years, 359 days
Estudio Estadio	TVE-1, Teledeporte	1972-2005, 2009-	Present	49 years, 314 days
Parlamento	TVE-1	1978	Present	47 years, 350 days
Últimas preguntas	La 2	1983	Present	42 years, 160 days
En portada	La 2	1984	Present	42 years, 79 days
Metrópolis	La 2	1985	Present	40 years, 338 days
Documentos TV	La 2	1986	Present	39 years, 330 days
Tendido cero	La 2	1986	Present	39 years, 358 days
Antena 3 Noticias	Antena 3	1990	Present	36 years, 59 days
Informativos Telecinco	Telecinco	1990	Present	35 years, 326 days
Días de cine	La 2	1991	Present	34 years, 170 days
Jara y sedal	La 2	1992	Present	33 years, 167 days
La aventura del saber	La 2	1992	Present	33 years, 163 days
Cine de barrio	TVE-1	1995	Present	30 years, 258 days
La noche temática	La 2	1995	Present	30 years, 173 days
Espejo público	Antena 3	1996	Present	29 years, 156 days
Saber y ganar	La 2	1997	Present	29 years, 36 days
El escarabajo verde	La 2	1997	Present	28 years, 305 days
Corazón	TVE-1	1997	Present	28 years, 261 days
Agrosfera	La 2	1997	Present	28 years, 165 days
La ruleta de la fortuna	Antena 3, Telecinco	1990-1997, 2006	Present	27 years, 201 days
Versión española	La 2	1998	Present	27 years, 170 days
Telepasión española	TVE-1	1990-2006, 2015-	Present	27 years, 84 days
Bricomanía	La 2, Telecinco, Antena 3	1994	2020	26 years, 87 days
Los Desayunos de TVE	TVE-1	1994	2020	25 years, 351 days
Pasapalabra	Antena 3, Telecinco	2000	Present	25 years, 244 days
La 2 Noticias	La 2	1994	2020	25 years, 127 days
Aquí hay trabajo	La 2	2000	Present	25 years, 142 days
Estadio 2	La 2	1984	2007	22 years, 265 days
Cuéntame cómo pasó	TVE-1	2001	2023	22 years, 77 days
Pocoyo	La 2, La 1, Clan	2005–2010, 2016–	Present	21 years, 77 days
Cuarto milenio	Cuatro	2005	Present	20 years, 129 days
El programa de AR	Telecinco	2005-2023, 2025-	Present	19 years, 290 days
El intermedio	LaSexta	2006	Present	19 years, 360 days
LaSexta Noticias	LaSexta	2006	Present	19 years, 195 days
El Hormiguero	Cuatro, Antena 3	2006	Present	19 years, 182 days
Gran hermano	Telecinco	2000-2017; 2024-¿?	Present	19 years, 70 days
España en comunidad	La 2	2000	2020	19 years, 104 days
Decogarden	La 2	2001	2020	19 years, 40 days
La que se avecina	Telecinco	2007	Present	18 years, 337 days
Página 2	La 2	2007	Present	18 years, 141 days
Cámara abierta	La 2	2007	Present	18 years, 133 days
Report	TVE-1	2007	Present	18 years, 118 days
En lengua de signos	La 2	2008	Present	18 years, 51 days
Salvados	LaSexta	2008	Present	18 years, 29 days
Estudio 1	TVE-1	1965	1984	18 years, 319 days
Megatrix	Antena 3	1995	2013	18 years, 42 days
Zoom Tendencias	La 2	2008	Present	17 years, 181 days
Redes	TVE-1	1996	2013	17 years, 161 days
Comando actualidad	TVE-1	2008	2025	17 years, 120 days
Novela	TVE-1	1962	1979	17 years, 82 days
Club Disney	TVE-1, Telecinco	1990	2007	16 years, 303 days
RTVE responde	La 2	2009	Present	16 years, 327 days
El Grand Prix del verano	TVE-1	1995-1999; 2023	Present	16 years, 294 days
Para todos La 2	La 2	2010	Present	16 years, 20 days
Corazón, corazón	TVE-1	1993	2010	16 years, 213 days
Gente	TVE-1	1995	2011	15 years, 328 days
Imprescindibles	La 2	2010	Present	15 years, 264 days
Noticias Cuatro	Cuatro	2005-2019; 2024-	Present	15 years, 157 days
Al rojo vivo	LaSexta	2011	Present	15 years, 74 days
Equipo de investigación	Antena 3, LaSexta	2011	Present	15 years, 53 days
Your Face Sounds Familiar	Antena 3	2011	Present	14 years, 178 days
Flash Moda	TVE-1, la 2	2011	Present	14 years, 266 days
Operación Triunfo	TVE-1, Telecinco	2001-2011; 2017-	2020	14 years, 354 days
La sexta columna	LaSexta	2012	Present	14 years, 57 days
España directo	TVE-1	2005-2011, 2013-	2022	14 years, 348 days
Cartelera	TVE-1	1994	2009	14 years, 237 days
Españoles en el mundo	TVE-1	2009	2023	14 years, 201 days
Un, dos, tres... responda otra vez	TVE-1	1972	2004	14 years, 73 days
Sálvame	Telecinco	2009	2023	14 years, 57 days
Sábado Deluxe	Telecinco	2009	2023	13 years, 341 days
Nosolomusica	Telecinco	1999	2012	13 years, 207 days
La clave	La 2, Antena 3	1976-1985, 1990	1993	13 years, 123 days
La mirada crítica	Telecinco	1998-2009; 2023-	Present	13 years, 361 days
Centímetros cúbicos	Antena 3	2012	Present	13 years, 344 days
Audiencia abierta	TVE-1	2012	Present	13 years, 163 days
Más vale tarde	LaSexta	2012	Present	13 years, 147 days
Cómo nos reimos	La 2	2012	Present	13 years, 107 days
La mandrágora	La 2	1997	2009	12 years, 342 days
Hospital Central	Telecinco	2000	2012	12 years, 241 days
Saber vivir	TVE-1	1997	2009	12 years, 225 days
Mujeres y Hombres y Viceversa	Telecinco, Cuatro	2008	2021	12 years, 289 days
Revista de toros	TVE-1	1971	1983	12 years, 160 days
El club de la comedia	Telecinco, La 2, Antena 3, LaSexta	1999-2005, 2011-	2017	12 years, 106 days
Jugones	LaSexta	2013	Present	12 years, 358 days
MasterChef	TVE-1	2013	Present	12 years, 349 days
Viaje al centro de la tele	TVE-1	2013	Present	12 years, 259 days
Atención obras	La 2	2013	Present	13 years, 10 days
Cachitos de hierro y cromo	La 2	2013	Present	12 years, 149 days
El jefe infiltrado	Antena 3, LaSexta	2014	Present	12 years, 5 days
Planeta Calleja	Cuatro	2014	Present	11 years, 345 days
Aquí la Tierra	TVE-1	2014	Present	11 years, 302 days

== See also ==
- List of longest-running UK television series
- List of longest-running United States television series
- List of longest-running Philippine television series
- List of longest-running Indian television series
