= Pesadilla en la cocina =

Spanish reality television series

- Genre: Food reality
- Based on: Ramsay's Kitchen Nightmares
- Written by: Marta Machuca; José Miguel Romo; Óscar Prol; Pablo Aguinaga
- Directed by: María Ascen Recarte; José Rueda
- Presented by: Alberto Chicote
- Country of origin: Spain
- Original language: Spanish
- No. of seasons: 9
- No. of episodes: 126

Production
- Executive producer: Edi Walter
- Production company: EyeWorks Cuatro Cabezas

Original release
- Network: laSexta
- Release: October 25, 2012 – present

Pesadilla en la cocina (English: Nightmare in the kitchen) is a Spanish food reality television program hosted by chef Alberto Chicote.

It airs on laSexta, and is the Spanish adaptation of the Ramsay's Kitchen Nightmares franchise.

== History ==
The original format started on British station Channel 4 in 2004 under the name Ramsay's Kitchen Nightmares. It was hosted by renowned chef Gordon Ramsay, who tried to save British catering establishments on the verge of bankruptcy. Its success led to Fox Broadcasting Company acquiring the rights to the format and launching the American version, also hosted by Ramsay, in 2007.

In 2010, Spanish TV station Nova, owned by Grupo Antena 3 (now Atresmedia), started airing both the British and American versions of the show, notching notable rating figures for the channel's standards. In 2012, right before its merging into Grupo Antena 3, laSexta acquired the rights to the format and started preparing the launch of the Spanish version of the show, which would be named Pesadilla en la cocina (the same title under which Nova still airs Ramsay's Kitchen Nightmares and Kitchen Nightmares to this day). Pesadilla en la cocina premiered on laSexta's prime time slot on October 25, 2012. The chef selected to host the format was Madrid-born Alberto Chicote, who was named restaurateur of the year in Spain in 2006 and was the owner of Pandelujo, named restaurant of the year in 2010.

== Failures and controversies ==
- El Castro de Lugo, in Madrid, closed shortly before the episode about it aired. Besides, the cook, who was portrayed on the show as an absent-minded and extremely devout woman, claimed everything was scripted and she had been forced to play that role. She also added that the part where she was shown praying in a nearby church was filmed without her consent.
- Da Vinci (renamed Nuevo Da Vinci while filming), in Moraira (Alicante) closed two weeks later than El Castro. Its owner claimed that Chicote's advice had proven useless and criticized statements made by Chicote on El Hormiguero. Later the owner's son refuted him claiming that the changes Chicote suggested were good for business, but were not useful because of the lack of commitment of his father.
- In June 2013, it was announced that Japanese restaurant To-Toro (formerly Osaka), located in Ronda (Málaga) was closing its doors.
- La Ermita, in Madrid, closed during the summer of 2013 for undisclosed reasons.
- Katay, in Tomares (Seville), was closed by its owners in October 2013. They thanked the crew of the show for their efforts.
- In 2014, Sip Bar (renamed Flor de Tapa while filming), in Miami (Florida, United States), closed once Chicote helped them. The current status of the restaurant is unknown, since its Facebook page still features its old name and has no recent references. It has been reported to have closed forever.
- L'Orbayu, in Las Vegas (Asturias) closed in June 2013, apparently due to its owner's health issues.
- La Hamburguesía (renamed La Broqueta while filming), in Alcoy (Alicante) saw a rare case of double sell in which the original owners, with the restaurant recently renovated after shooting the show, sold it only for the new owner to sell it again shortly after. They were accused of illegally profiting from the show.
- For the relaunch of restaurant Yatiri in Ibiza, the crew of the show organized a press conference with local media, something unheard of until then. However, the restaurant failed to stay afloat and was sold soon after.

Aside of the closures listed above, Pesadilla en la cocina has also seen some controversial incidents. The most notorious of them happened in Bilbao, when Chicote went to help La Reina del Arenal and its annex Opila. The owners asked the station not to air the episode about them claiming they had been coerced, and claimed it had been manipulated after its broadcast. Also, Chicote was accused of homophobic behaviour when he told one of the owners that he looked "like a little girl" and asked him if he would "put anything into his mouth".

Other person who raised his voice against Pesadilla en la cocina was Cristóbal, the owner of El Yugo de Castilla (Boecillo, Valladolid), personal friend of Alberto Chicote, who completely ignored his advice after filming. Later he would claim that his suggestions were not adequate and that the renovation made his restaurant look worse. El Yugo would remain closed to the public and serving only personal requests until 2016.

== Episode list ==
=== Season 1 ===
#	Restaurant	Cuisine	Location	Air date	Mill. viewers (Share)	Current status
1	La Tana	Spanish	Pinto, Madrid	October 25, 2012	2.802 (13.7%)	Sold
2	Da Vinci	Spanish	Moraira, Alicante	November 1, 2012	2.483 (12.7%)	Closed
3	El gusto es nuestro	Spanish	Villa de Vallecas, Madrid	November 8, 2012	2.517 (12.4%)	Sold
4	El último Agave	Mexican	Eixample, Barcelona	November 15, 2012	2.154 (10.2%)	Closed
5	El Castro de Lugo	Spanish	Tetuán, Madrid	November 22, 2012	3.01 (15.3%)	Closed
6	Dómine Cabra	Spanish	Las Letras, Madrid	November 29, 2012	2.508 (12.3%)	Closed
7	La Reina del Arenal & Opila	Spanish	Bilbao, Biscay	December 6, 2012	2.366 (12%)	Open
8	Osaka (renamed To-Toro)	Japanese	Ronda, Málaga	December 13, 2012	2.479 (12.4%)	Sold
9	Sagar	Indian	Salamanca, Madrid	December 20, 2012	2.428 (12.4%)	Open
10	La Ermita	Spanish	Alcobendas, Madrid	January 13, 2013	2.097 (10.1%)	Closed
11	El Bodegón	Spanish	Guadalajara	January 20, 2013	2.292 (11%)	Open
12	El Pozo Viejo	Spanish	Marbella, Málaga	January 27, 2013	1.932 (8.8%)	Sold

=== Season 2 ===
#	Restaurant	Cuisine	Location	Air date	Mill. viewers (Share)	Current status
13	Katay	Japanese	Tomares, Seville	May 9, 2013	2.302 (11.6%)	Closed
14	El Yugo de Castilla	Spanish	Boecillo, Valladolid	May 16, 2013	2.244 (11.3%)	Closed
15	La Mansión	Spanish	Navalcarnero, Madrid	May 23, 2013	2.201 (11.3%)	Open
16	La Zapatería	Spanish	Sol, Madrid	May 30, 2013	2.602 (13.4%)	Sold
17	Nou Set	Spanish	Premià de Mar, Barcelona	June 6, 2013	2.455 (12.8%)	Sold
18	Parador de Villa (renamed Prost)	Spanish	Villaviciosa de Odón, Madrid	June 13, 2013	2.383 (13%)	Sold
19	Vivaldi	Italian	Sants, Barcelona	June 20, 2013	2.964 (16.3%)	Closed
20	El Chiringuito del Tío Matías (renamed El Cubano)	Spanish	Aguadulce, Almería	June 27, 2013	2.319 (14.7%)	Open

=== Season 3 ===
#	Restaurant	Cuisine	Location	Air date	Mill. viewers (Share)	Current status
21	Taberna La Concha	Spanish	El Rocío, Huelva	January 27, 2014	2.751 (12.8%)	Open
22	Las Noches de Moscú	Russian	Malasaña, Madrid	January 27, 2014	2.121 (13.6%)	Closed
23	La Barrica	Spanish	Alcalá de Henares, Madrid	February 3, 2014	2.498 (12.1%)	Sold
24	Anou	Spanish	Valencia	February 10, 2014	2.479 (11.8%)	Open
25	Taberna La Goyesca	Spanish	Tetuán, Madrid	February 17, 2014	2.162 (10.4%)	Open
26	What happened to...? (1) (La Tana, La Zapatería, Nou Set, El Yugo de Castilla, El Último Agave)			February 24, 2014	2.466 (11.8%)	—N/a
27	Cool Palace (renamed La Panmediterránea)	Spanish	Rivas-Vaciamadrid, Madrid	March 3, 2014	2.357 (11.6%)	Closed
28	Picanha	Brazilian	Chamberí, Madrid	March 10, 2014	1.826 (9.2%)	Closed
29	Sip Bar (renamed Flor de Tapa)	Spanish	Miami, Florida, United States	March 17, 2014	2.053 (10.2%)	Closed
30	La Masia de l'Era	Spanish	La Riera de Gaià, Tarragona	March 24, 2014	2.596 (12.3%)	Closed
31	El Gran Café	Spanish	Coslada, Madrid	March 31, 2014	2.488 (11.8%)	Open
32	Picasso	Spanish	Los Abrigos, Santa Cruz de Tenerife	April 7, 2014	2.666 (12.8%)	Sold
33	L'Orbayu	Spanish	Las Vegas, Asturias	April 21, 2014	2.508 (12.4%)	Closed
34	Alcalá UnoDosCinco	Spanish	Salamanca, Madrid	April 28, 2014	2.373 (11.7%)	Closed
35	El Puerto	Spanish	Benidorm, Alicante	May 5, 2014	2.662 (13.1%)	Open
36	La Parrilla de Poli	Bulgarian	Aluche, Madrid	May 12, 2014	2.347 (11.4%)	Sold
37	34 Bar (renamed F. M. Food and Music)	Spanish	Cercedilla, Madrid	May 19, 2014	2.621 (12.7%)	Closed
38	El Edén	Spanish	Sants, Barcelona	May 26, 2014	2.504 (11.9%)	Closed
39	What happened to...? (2) (La Barrica, Anou, El Bodegón, Taberna La Concha, Sagar)			June 2, 2014	2.267 (11.1%)	—N/a
40	The 7 Capital Sins of Pesadilla en la Cocina			June 9, 2014	1.682 (8.5%)	—N/a

=== Season 4 ===
#	Restaurant	Cuisine	Location	Air date	Mill. viewers (Share)	Current status
41	La Estación	Spanish	Las Torres de Cotillas, Murcia	April 15, 2015	2.265 (11.6%)	Closed
42	Karma	Moroccan	San Sebastián de los Reyes, Madrid	April 15, 2015	1.854 (14.2%)	Closed
43	Le Terrazze	Italian	Sant Josep de sa Talaia, Ibiza	April 22, 2015	1.724 (9%)	Closed
44	Brasas (renamed La Mariña de Luarca)	Spanish	Luarca, Asturias	April 22, 2015	1.607 (12.5%)	Open
45	Sukur (renamed La Retama)	Greek	Barri Gòtic, Barcelona	April 29, 2015	2.066 (10.5%)	Sold
46	La Hamburguesía (renamed La Broqueta)	Spanish	Alcoy, Alicante	May 6, 2015	1.844 (9.6%)	Sold
47	Mesón Galicia	Spanish	Hamburg, Germany	May 13, 2015	1.768 (9.6%)	Open
48	El Montecillo	Spanish	Puerto de la Torre, Málaga	May 20, 2015	2.101 (10.8%)	Closed
49	What happened to...? (3) (El Puerto, El Cubano, Dómine Cabra, El Edén)			May 27, 2015	1.929 (10.1%)	—N/a
50	La Taberneta	Spanish	Eixample, Barcelona	June 3, 2015	2.082 (11.2%)	Sold
51	La Corte	Spanish	Fuenlabrada, Madrid	June 10, 2015	2.236 (12%)	Re-opened
52	Yatiri	Spanish	Ibiza	June 17, 2015	2.171 (11.6%)	Closed
53	L'Olivé	Andorran	Andorra la Vella, Andorra	June 24, 2015	2.1 (12.2%)	Open
54	What happened to...? (4) (La Parrilla de Poli, La Panmediterránea, La Estación, Prost)			July 1, 2015	1.634 (9.9%)	—N/a
55	Pesadilla en la Cocina in 10 Rounds			July 8, 2015	1.038 (6.8%)	—N/a
56	The Handbook to Save Your Restaurant			July 15, 2015	0.837 (5.7%)	—N/a

=== Season 5 ===
#	Restaurant	Cuisine	Location	Air date	Mill. viewers (Share)	Current status
57	Némesis (renamed Némesis Waterfront Restaurant)	Spanish	Badalona, Barcelona	September 22, 2016	1.831 (11.1%)	Sold
58	Don Super Pollo (renamed Leña al Pollo)	Spanish	Mataró, Barcelona	September 22, 2016	1.383 (15.2%)	Sold
59	Ele	Spanish	Utrecht, Netherlands	September 29, 2016	1.911 (11.4%)	Open
60	Hot Beach (renamed Gold Beach)	Spanish	Alicante	October 6, 2016	1.758 (10.1%)	Sold
61	Irlanda (renamed Lembranzas de Irlanda) (Note: Reverted to its original name after the episode was aired.)	Spanish	Ferrol, A Coruña	October 13, 2016	1.919 (11%)	Open
62	Baltias (renamed Baltias Pantone)	Spanish	Madrid	October 20, 2016	2.113 (11.8%)	Closed
63	Asador Juan de Austria	Spanish	Villarejo de Salvanés, Madrid	October 27, 2016	1.907 (10.7%)	Closed
64	Pizzeria Il Tartufo	Italian	Ubrique, Cádiz	November 3, 2016	2.016 (11.8%)	Closed
65	House Café	Spanish	Pinos Genil, Granada	November 10, 2016	2.201 (12.9%)	Open
66	La terraza de Rocío	Spanish	Valencina de la Concepción, Seville	November 17, 2016	2.404 (14.1%)	Sold
67	Café Zamora (renamed El Zamora)	Spanish	Zamora	November 24, 2016	2.463 (14.3%)	Open
68	María La Portuguesa (renamed Cheespain)	Portuguese	Sol, Madrid	December 1, 2016	2.369 (13.3%)	Sold
69	El Rey	Spanish	Balsicas, Murcia	December 15, 2016	2.287 (13,2%)	Open

=== Season 6 ===
#	Restaurant	Cuisine	Location	Air date	Mill. viewers (Share)	Current status
70	Christmas Eve Nightmares			December 24, 2017	0.367 (4%)	—N/a
71	Mizuna	Thai	Girona	May 9, 2018	1.46 (8.7%)	Closed
72	Casa Pili	Spanish	Castro Urdiales, Cantabria	May 16, 2018	1.641 (9.8%)	Sold
73	Generación del 27 (renamed Taberna del Sur)	Spanish	Almería	May 23, 2018	1.506 (9%)	Closed
74	A Cañada (renamed Delic Experience)	Spanish	Las Acacias, Madrid	May 30, 2018	1.778 (10.2%)	Closed
75	El Rosal	Spanish	Córdoba	June 6, 2018	1.741 (9.8%)	Open
76	Tetería Nazarí	Spanish	Melilla	June 13, 2018	1.907 (11.5%)	Open
77	El Racó Marítim	Spanish	Valencia	June 20, 2018	1.934 (11.9%)	Sold
78	La Casuca (renamed El Figón del Norte)	Spanish	Móstoles, Madrid	June 27, 2018	1.951 (12.5%)	Closed
79	Olé Jatetxea (renamed Maltea)	Spanish	Pamplona, Navarre	July 4, 2018	1.683 (11.1%)	Open
80	Phoenix	Spanish	Elche, Alicante	July 11, 2018	1.692 (11.3%)	Closed

=== Season 7 ===
#	Restaurant	Cuisine	Location	Air date	Mill. viewers (Share)	Current status
81	Mosto Tejero	Spanish	Jerez de la Frontera, Cádiz	October 3, 2019	1.288 (9.4%)	Closed
82	La Cueva de Juan (renamed La Cueva)	Spanish	Paiporta, Valencia	October 10, 2019	1.279 (8.6%)	Sold
83	El Jardín del Pensador (renamed El Jardín)	Spanish	Plasencia, Cáceres	October 17, 2019	1.202 (8.4%)	Closed
84	El Submarino	Spanish	Food truck in Barcelona	October 24, 2019	1.363 (9.4%)	Closed
85	Pepe's Cantina	Mexican / Spanish	Rota, Cádiz	October 31, 2019	1.041 (7.9%)	Closed
86	A la Parrilla (renamed Casa Cacenebo)	Spanish	Badajoz	November 14, 2019	1.328 (9%)	Closed
87	La Tarantella	Italian	Barcelona	November 21, 2019	1.04 (7.1%)	Closed
88	Lolailo	Spanish	Valencia	November 28, 2019	1.257 (8.7%)	Closed
89	Reina Mariana (renamed Il Nuevo Piero)	Italian / Spanish	Valencia	December 12, 2019	1.16 (8%)	Sold
90	El Rincón de Montse (renamed El Cucharón de Daganzo)	Spanish	Daganzo de Arriba, Madrid	December 19, 2019	1.188 (7.5%)	Closed
91	El Cantábrico	Spanish	Cádiz	January 9, 2020	1.334 (8.6%)	Closed
92	Tigris	Moroccan	Alcorcón, Madrid	January 16, 2020	1.076 (7.1%)	Open
93	Rusiñol	Spanish	Aranjuez, Madrid	January 23, 2020	1.095 (6.9%)	Closed
94	El Legado de Andrés	Spanish	Navalmoral de la Mata, Cáceres	January 30, 2020	1.005 (6.6%)	Open
95	La Habana (renamed La Foguera)	Spanish	Gijón, Asturias	February 6, 2020	0.870 (5.6%)	Closed
96	La Madrina	Ecuadorian	Villaverde, Madrid	February 13, 2020	0.872 (5.6%)	Open
