= Carmen Lomana =

Spanish businesswoman, television host, socialite and haute couture collector

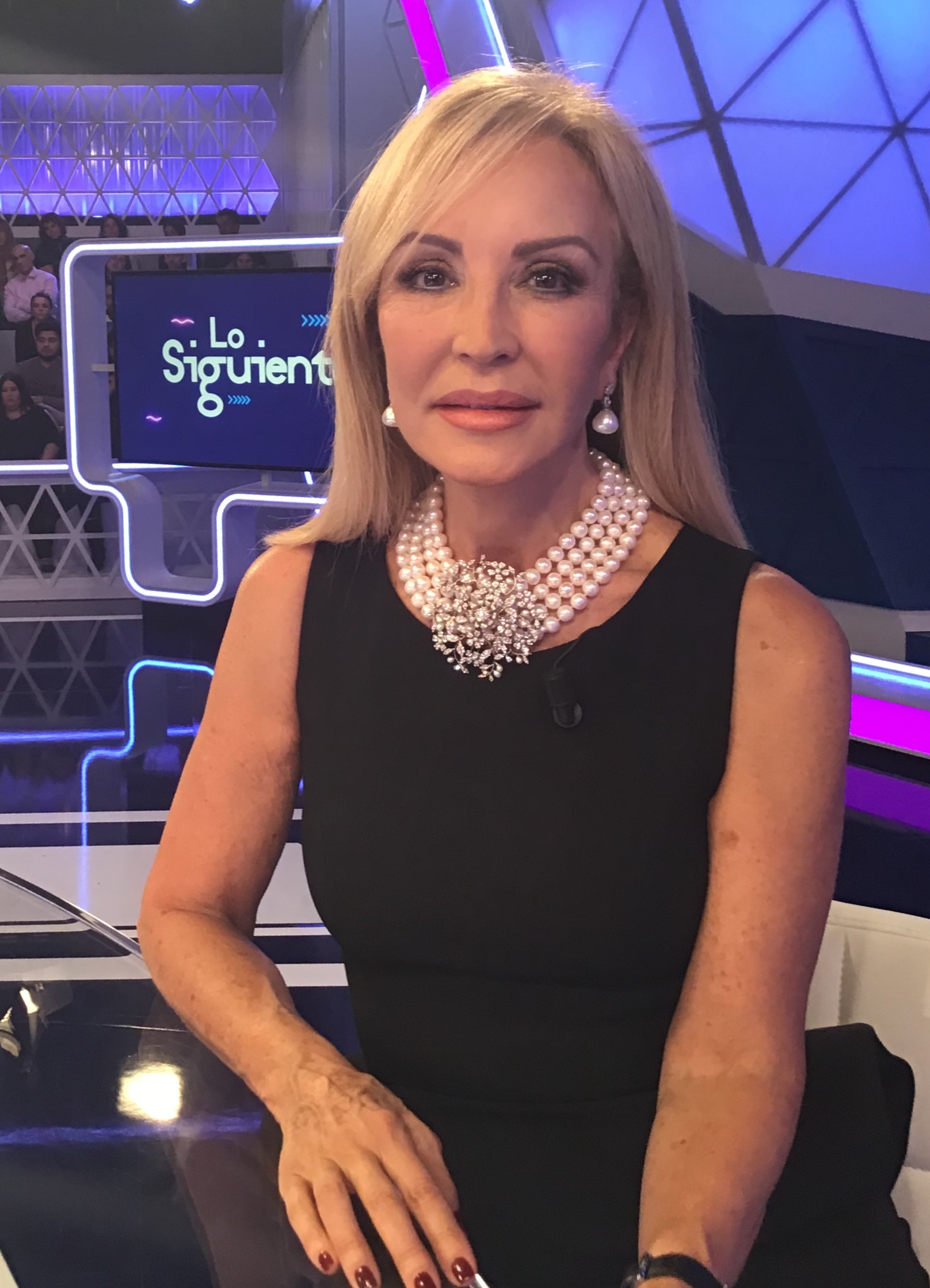
- Lomana in 2018
- Born: María del Carmen Fernández de Lomana Gutiérrez-Garcia; 1 August 1948 (age 78); León, Spain
- Education: BA, Philosophy
- Alma mater: University of London
- Occupations: Businesswoman, television host
- Years active: 2000s-present (television host)
- Television: Antena 3 (2008–2013); Telecinco (2010–2016); La 1 (2012-present)
- Height: 1.72 m (5 ft 8 in)
- Spouse: Guillermo Capdevila (1974–1999)
- Parent(s): Heliodoro Carmelo Fernández-Lomana Perelétegui; María Josefa Gutiérrez García

María del Carmen Fernández de Lomana Gutiérrez (born 1 August 1948) known as Carmen Lomana, is a Spanish businesswoman, television host, socialite and haute couture collector. She is the widow of Guillermo Capdevila, a famous Chilean industrial designer who died in 1999.

== Life ==
She was born in León, Spain. The daughter of Basque banker of French descent Heliodoro Carmelo Fernández de Lomana y Perelétegui and of the Astur-Leonese with Cuban aristocratic roots María Josefa Gutiérrez-García y Fernández-Getino, she is the first of the four siblings of an upper class San Sebastián family. She worked for Banco de Bilbao and Banco de Santander and studied Philosophy in London.

She was a candidate for the Mayoralty of Madrid. She is mortal enemy of haute couture collector Eloísa Bercero.

She is the sister of Rafa Lomana, a deputy of the far-right Vox party.

She was named in the Panama Papers case in April 2016.

== Television appearances ==
- Así nos va (2013), LaSexta.
- Dando la nota (2012), Antena 3 TV.
- Las joyas de la corona (2010), Telecinco.
- Sálvame (2010), Telecinco.
- ¡Más que baile! (2010), Telecinco.
- Sálvame Deluxe (2009 y 2010), Telecinco.
- Paz en la tierra (2009), Canal Sur.
- ¿Dónde estás corazón? (2009), Antena 3 TV.
- Ratones coloraos (2009), Canal Sur.
- Sé lo que hicisteis... (2009), LaSexta.
- Comando actualidad (2009), TVE.
- Punto DOC (2008), Antena 3 TV.
