= Luján Argüelles =

Spanish television presenter (born 1977)

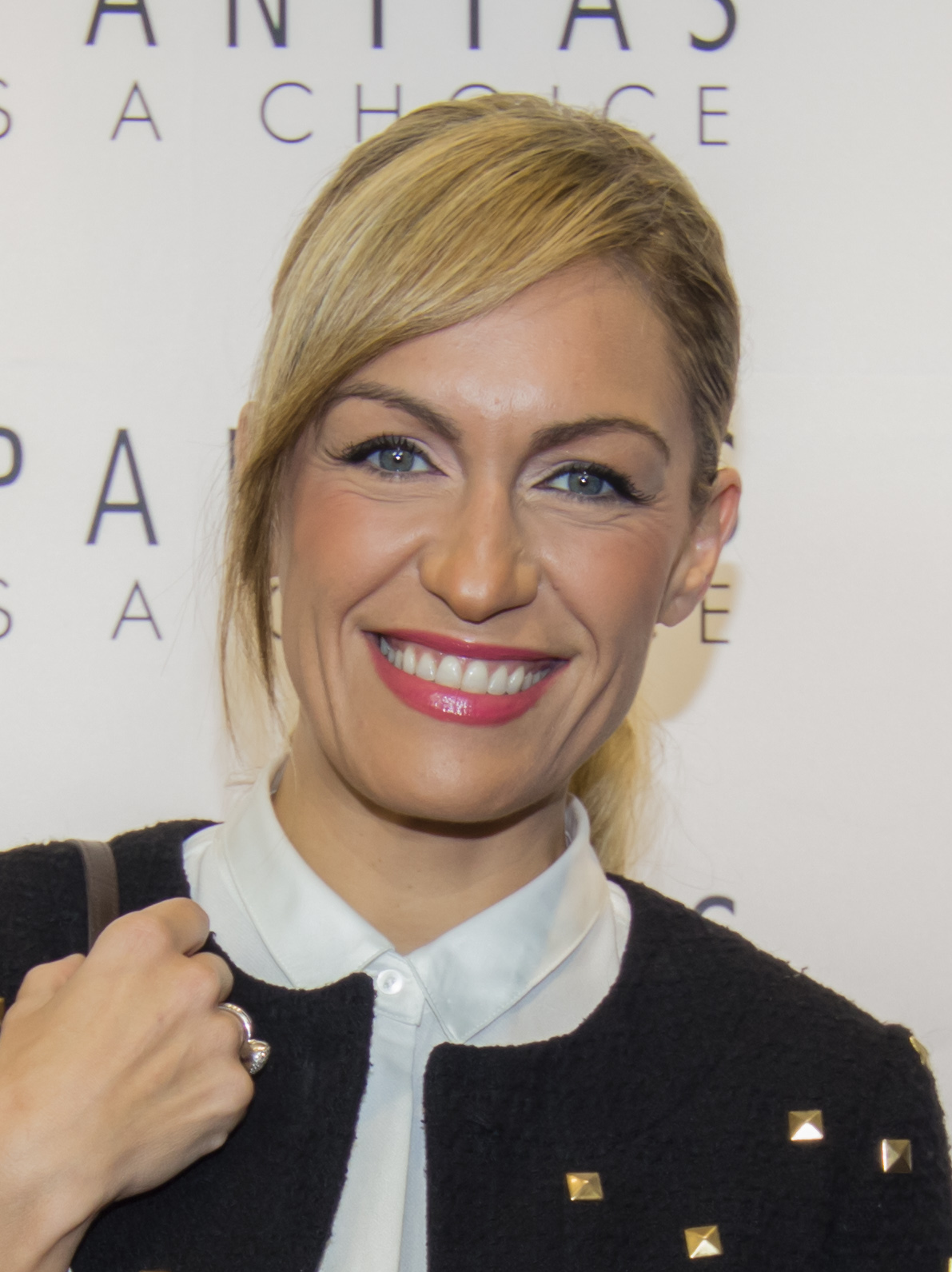
- Luján Argüelles in 2016
- Born: María Luján Argüelles Álvarez; 26 January 1977 (age 49); Salas, Spain
- Occupation: Television presenter
- Years active: 2000–present

María Luján Argüelles Álvarez (Salas, Asturias, Spain; January 26, 1977) is a Spanish radio broadcaster and television presenter.

== Biography ==
She began her professional career at the age of 19, while studying history and playing the piano. After working for Radio Vetusta, she decided to move to Madrid and signed up for Onda Cero. She did both radio and TV work from 2001 to 2002. She started her career on May 3, 2001, on Canal 7 in Madrid, where she hosted the show E-Misión Glamourosa until June 29, 2001.

In 2002, she signed with Antena 3, where she worked as a reporter in several programs, a moment in which her name began to be known to viewers and that led her to combine it with the presentation of the summer magazine La orilla on TeleAsturias and Asturias in RTPA.

In 2008, she began a new stage in Cuatro. A year later, she signed a 4-year contract with the same channel. During this period, she was in charge of Password and Lo que diga la rubia, among other programs.

In 2010, the merger between Sogecuatro and Gestevisión Telecinco, took place, thus creating the Mediaset España group, with which the presenter renewed her long-term contract with Cuatro in 2014.

During this stage, she was in charge of several contests, but what really catapulted her to fame was her role as a matchmaker in several dating shows. In April 2018, after almost a year without new projects in the group, it was announced that she would not renew her contract with Mediaset España after 10 years in Cuatro and 8 years in the group. She worked with the group and did a radio show for Agencia EFE at the same time.

Although she did not renew her contract with Mediaset Españaas a presenter, she remained linked to the media group as a collaborator, first in El programa de Ana Rosa on Telecinco and later in Cuatro al día in the afternoons on Cuatro.

Simultaneously, she signs with Telemadrid and presents La báscula from September 2018 to 2020, and since 2019, she has collaborated in Está pasando, which she also presents when its presenter is absent. During this stage, she continues to lead the radio program of Agencia EFE.

In December 2020, she will present the contest Divididos in La Sexta, despite her commitments with Telemadrid and EFE radio.

=== Private life ===
On July 13, 2015, Luján gives birth to her first daughter with businessman Carlos Sánchez Arenas, whom she named Miranda.

== Trajectory ==
=== Radio ===
Year	Program	Radio channel	Notes
2000–2001	Protagonistas	Onda Cero	With Luis del Olmo
2001–2002	La rosa de los vientos	Onda Cero	With Juan Antonio Cebrián
2002–2003	Esta noche o nunca	Onda Cero	With José Luis Salas
2003–2004	Herrera en la onda	With Carlos Herrera	Onda Cero
2004–2008	A ver si te atreves	Onda Cero	Alone
2010–present	La hora de Luján	EFE	Weekly

=== Television ===
Year	Serie	Channel	Role
2001	E-Misión Glamourosa	Canal 7	Host
2002–2007	7 días, 7 noches	Antena 3	Reporter
2003–2007	La Orilla	TeleAsturias	Host
2006–2008	Asturias en 25	RTPA	Host
2007–2008	Punto Doc	Antena 3	Reporter
2008–2010	Password	Cuatro	Host
2009–2011	Granjero busca esposa	Cuatro	Host
2010	Lo que diga la rubia	Cuatro	Host
2010	Cuatro con la roja	Cuatro	Co-host
2010–2011	Dame una pista	Cuatro	Host
2011	Hijos de papá	Cuatro	Host
2011	Tienes 1 minuto	Cuatro	Host
2011–2013	Las mañanas de Cuatro	Cuatro	Collaborator
2012–2017	¿Quién quiere casarse con mi hijo?	Cuatro	Host
2013	Money time	Cuatro	Host
2013–2015	Un príncipe para...	Cuatro	Host
2013	¿Quién quiere casarse con mi madre?	Cuatro	Host
2013–2014	Inteligencia artificial	Cuatro	Host
2015–2016	La noche en Paz	Telecinco	Co-host
2017	Tú, yo y mi avatar	Cuatro	Host
2018–2019	El programa de Ana Rosa	Telecinco	Collaborator
2018–2020	La Báscula	Telemadrid	Host
2019–2020	Cuatro al día	Cuatro	Collaborator
2019–2020	Supervivientes: Tierra de nadie	Cuatro	Collaborator
2020	Adivina qué hago esta noche	Cuatro	Guest
2019–2021	Está pasando	Telemadrid	Collaborator
2020	Divididos	La Sexta	Host
2021	Family Feud: La batalla de los famosos	Antena 3	Contestant
2022	¿A quién le gusta mi follower?	Netflix	Host

== Published books ==
- Cenicienta llevaba tacones de 15 cm. Martínez Roca. 2014. Pages: 288. ISBN 9788427041042

== Awards ==
- Antena de Oro Award 2009 for best presenter for Password and Granjero busca esposa.
- Zapping Awards 2011 for best presenter for Dame una pista and Granjero busca esposa.
