= Will Keen =

English actor (born 1970)

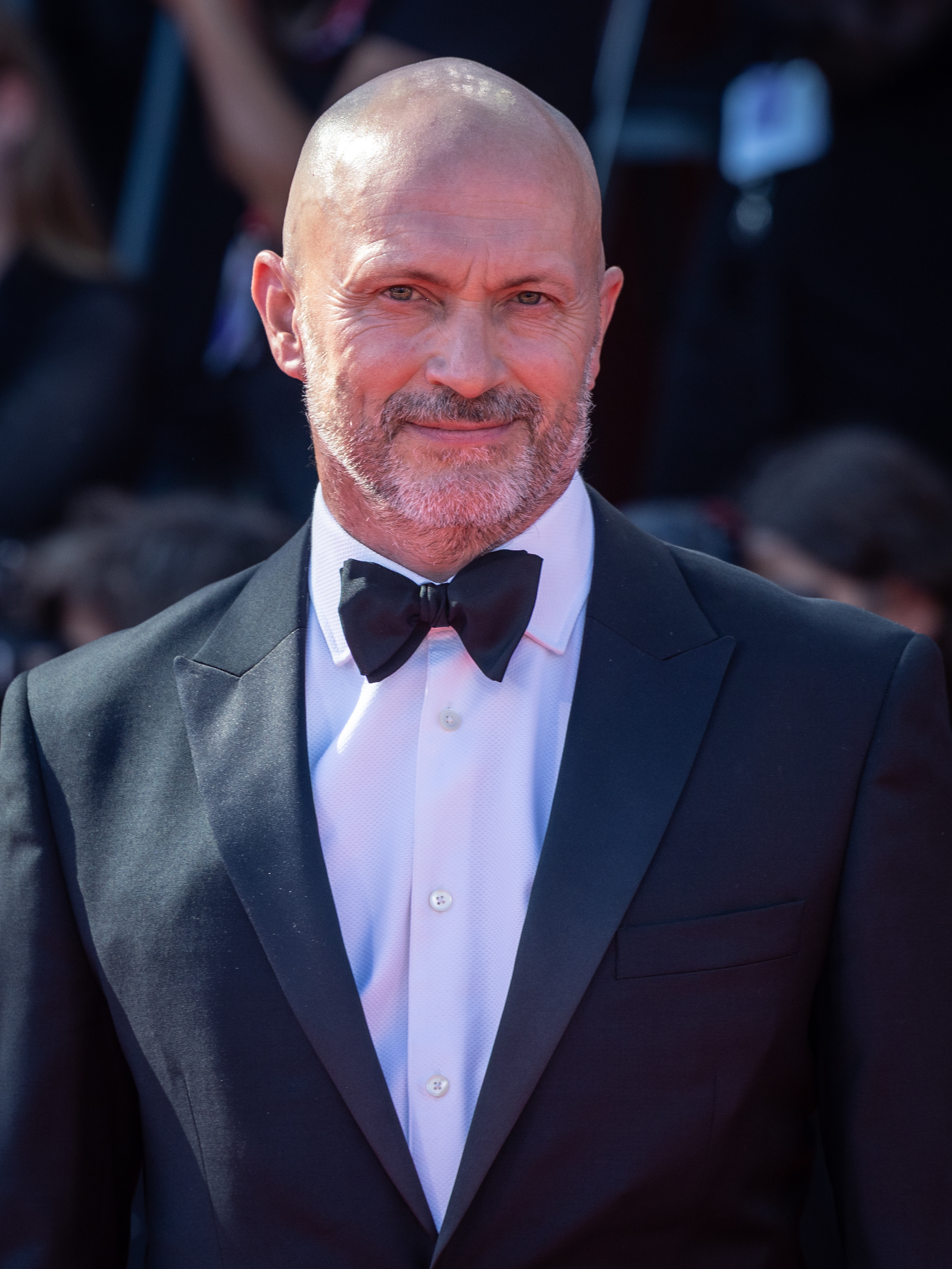
- Keen in 2025
- Born: William Walter Maurice Keen; 4 March 1970 (age 56); Oxford, Oxfordshire, England
- Occupation: Actor
- Years active: 1993–present
- Spouse: María Fernández Ache (m. 2002–2021)
- Children: Dafne Keen
- Relatives: Laura Beatty (sister); Alice Oswald (sister) Edward Curzon, 6th Earl Howe (grandfather)

William Walter Maurice Keen (born 4 March 1970) is an English actor. His screen credits include Wolf Hall, The Musketeers, Sherlock, Wired, Elizabeth I, Titanic, Foyle's War, The Refugees, Nine Lives of Tomas Katz, Love and Other Disasters, The Crown (2016-2017), Genius: Picasso (2018), His Dark Materials (2019), Ridley Road (2021), My Lady Jane (2024), and The Lord of the Rings: The Rings of Power (2026). Keen is the father of Dafne Keen.

In 2022, His performace portraying Vladimir Putin in Peter Morgan's play Patriots, won him the 2023 Laurence Olivier Award for Best Actor in a Supporting Role.

== Life and career ==
=== Early years and education ===
Keen was born 4 March 1970 in Oxford, the son of Charles William Lyle Keen and Lady Priscilla Mary Rose Curzon, daughter of Edward Curzon, 6th Earl Howe. His sisters are the poet Alice Oswald and the author Laura Beatty. He studied at Eton College, and has a first class degree in English literature from the University of Oxford.

=== Theatre ===
Some of his notable British theatre credits include Ghosts, Waste, Tom & Viv, Five Gold Rings, Patriots (Almeida Theatre), Huis Clos (Trafalgar Studios), Macbeth, The Changeling (Cheek by Jowl, Barbican and international tours), The Arsonists (Royal Court Theatre), Kiss of the Spider Woman (Donmar Warehouse), The Rubenstein Kiss (Hampstead Theatre), Hysteria, Don Juan, Man and Superman (Theatre Royal, Bath), Pericles, The Duchess of Malfi, The Coast of Utopia (Royal National Theatre, London), Mary Stuart, and Quartermaine's Terms at Wyndham's Theatre.

In 2022, he played Vladimir Putin in the opening run of Peter Morgan's play Patriots, about the life of Russian oligarch Boris Berezovsky, at the Almeida Theatre in London. His performace as putin won him the 2023 Laurence Olivier Award for Best Actor in a Supporting Role.

=== Screen acting ===
His television credits include Wolf Hall, The Musketeers, Midsomer Murders, Silk, Sherlock, The Impressionists, Wired, Casualty 1907, Elizabeth I, New Tricks, Titanic, Foyle's War, The Colour of Magic, and The Refugees. His film credits include Nine Lives of Tomas Katz,and Love and Other Disasters.

In 2016, he played the role of the Queen's longtime Private Secretary, Michael Adeane, in the Netflix series The Crown, also Genius: Picasso (2018), and in 2019, he appeared in the BBC TV series His Dark Materials, based on the critically acclaimed book trilogy by Philip Pullman, as Father MacPhail (his daughter, Dafne, is the series' lead actress), whilst in 2021 he appeared as David Epstein in Ridley Road.

In 2024, he portrayed Duke of Norfolk in the television series My Lady Jane, and played Belzagar in the Prime Video series The Lord of the Rings: The Rings of Power (2026).

== Personal life ==
He was married to Spanish actress, theatre director, and writer Maria Fernandez Ache, with whom he has a daughter, Dafne Keen, who is also an actress. According to Dafne, Keen and Fernandez divorced circa 2021.

== Acting credits ==
=== Film ===
| Year | Title | Role | Notes |
|---|---|---|---|
| 2000 | The Nine Lives of Tomas Katz | Cuthbert | |
| 2006 | Love and Other Disasters | David Williams | |
| 2012 | Love Song | Garcin | |
| 2014 | Ghosts | Pastor Manders | |
| 2015 | Victor Frankenstein | Surgeon | |
| 2018 | The Man Who Killed Don Quixote | Producer | |
| 2021 | Operation Mincemeat | Salvador Gomez-Beare | |
| 2022 | The Man from Rome | Arzobispo Corvo | Spanish: La piel del tambor |
| 2023 | Consecration | John | |
| 2023 | Dead Shot | Woodville | |
| 2025 | The Wizard of the Kremlin | Boris Berezovsky | |
| TBA | The Return of Stanley Atwell | TBA | Post-production |

=== Television ===
| Year | Title | Role | Notes |
|---|---|---|---|
| 1993 | Between the Lines | P.C. James Willetts | Episode: "What's the Strength of This?" |
| 1994 | The Inspector Alleyn Mysteries | Ludovic | Episode: "Scales of Justice" |
| 1994 | Martin Chuzzlewit | Todgers' Lodger | Episode: "Episode Two" |
| 1996, 1997 | The Bill | Charlie Roberts / Justin Guthrie | 2 episodes |
| 2000 | Monsignor Renard | Jean-Paul Dufosse | Episode #1.3 |
| 2004 | Murphy's Law | Anthony Brody | Episode: "Convent" |
| 2004 | When I'm 64 | Doctor | Television film |
| 2005 | Midsomer Murders | Preaching Pete Kubatski | Episode: "Second Sight" |
| 2005 | Holby City | Andy Brack | Episode: "Patience" |
| 2005 | Elizabeth I | Francis Bacon | 2 episodes |
| 2006 | The Impressionists | Paul Cézanne | 3 episodes |
| 2008 | The Colour of Magic | Ganmack Treehallett | Miniseries; 2 episodes |
| 2008 | Casualty 1907 | Dr. James Sequeira | 4 episodes |
| 2008 | New Tricks | Ronnie Glazebrooke | Episode: "Mad Dogs" |
| 2010, 2015 | Foyle's War | Alan Deakin | 2 episodes |
| 2011 | The Man Who Crossed Hitler | Hans Frank | Television film |
| 2011 | Garrow's Law | Fullerton | Episode #3.3 |
| 2011, 2012 | Silk | Michael Connolly | 3 episodes |
| 2012 | Titanic | Chief Officer Wilde | 4 episodes |
| 2014 | Sherlock | Major Reed | Episode: "The Sign of Three" |
| 2014–2015 | The Refugees | Samuel | 7 episodes |
| 2015 | The Musketeers | Fernando Perales | 4 episodes |
| 2015 | Wolf Hall | Thomas Cranmer | 5 episodes |
| 2015 | The Scandalous Lady W | Mr. Bearcroft | Television film |
| 2016–2017 | The Crown | Michael Adeane | 15 episodes |
| 2018 | Genius: Picasso | Paul Rosenberg | 2 episodes |
| 2019 | Deep State | Marcus Hobbes | 2 episodes |
| 2019–2022 | His Dark Materials | Father MacPhail | Main role |
| 2020–2021 | Tell Me Who I Am | Albert James | 9 episodes |
| 2021 | The Pursuit of Love | Sir Leicester | 2 episodes |
| 2021 | Ridley Road | David Epstein | 4 episodes |
| 2021 | Temple | Ed | 2 episodes |
| 2023 | The Gold | Hugh Vincent QC | Episode: "Vengeance Is Easy, Justice Is Hard" |
| 2024 | My Lady Jane | Duke of Norfolk | 4 episodes |
| 2024 | The Lord of the Rings: The Rings of Power | Belzagar | Episode: "The Eagle and the Sceptre" |
| 2024 | Wolf Hall: The Mirror and the Light | Thomas Cranmer | 6 episodes |
| 2025 | Dope Girls | Frederick Asquith-Gore | 6 episodes |

=== Theatre ===
| Year | Title | Roles | Venue | Ref. |
|---|---|---|---|---|
| 2002 | The Coast of Utopia | Vissarion Belinsky | Royal National Theatre, London | |
| 2013 | Ghosts | Pastor Manders | Almeida Theatre, London | |
| 2022–2023 | Patriots | Vladimir Putin | Almeida Theatre; Noël Coward Theatre, West End | |
| 2024 | Patriots | Vladimir Putin | Ethel Barrymore Theatre, Broadway | |
| 2024 | Othello | Iago | Royal Shakespeare Company | |

== See also ==
- List of British actors
