= La Sexta 2 =

Private Spanish TV channel

laSexta2
- Country: Spain
- Broadcast area: Spain; Andorra
- Headquarters: Madrid

Programming
- Language(s): Spanish

Ownership
- Owner: Gestora de Inversiones Audiovisuales La Sexta
- Sister channels: laSexta laSexta3 laSexta HD; Gol TV

History
- Launched: 1 October 2010
- Closed: 1 May 2012

Links
- Website: www.lasexta.com

laSexta2 was a Spanish television channel, owned and operated by Gestora de Inversiones Audiovisuales La Sexta, owned of laSexta. It was founded and started to broadcast on 1 October 2010 and ceased broadcasting on 1 May 2012 and was replaced by Xplora due its low ratings.
