= Atreseries =

Spanish television network

- Country: Spain
- Broadcast area: Spain, reaching bordering regions via overspill of the Spanish terrestrial network

Programming
- Language: Spanish
- Picture format: 1080i HDTV

Ownership
- Owner: Atresmedia
- Sister channels: Antena 3 LaSexta; Neox; Nova; Mega

History
- Launched: June 1, 2014 (International); December 22, 2015 (Spain)

Links
- Website: atreseries.atresmedia.com

Availability

Streaming media
- Atresplayer: Live

Atreseries (A3S) is a Spanish television channel owned by Atresmedia. It was launched on Spanish DTT on 22 December 2015.

Atreseries releases historical TV series historically broadcast by Antena 3, LaSexta and films.

Its programming includes Allí abajo, Aquí no hay quien viva, Compañeros, Covert Affairs, Crimen en el paraíso, Cuerpo de élite, El amor está en el aire, El barco, El internado, El síndrome de Ulises, Fiscal Chase, Física o Química, La familia Mata, La tira, Looking, Los hombres de Paco, Los protegidos, Me resbala, Ninja Warrior, Rizzoli & Isles, Se ha escrito un crimen, Sorpresa ¡Sorpresa! and The Listener.

Atreseries Internacional was launched before the Spanish feed on 1 June 2014, a signal aimed at payment platforms in America and Europe, which only transmits Antena 3's own programming.
