= Joan Molina =

Spanish actor (1940–2014)

Joan Molina (November 15, 1940 – October 4, 2014) was a Spanish film and television actor, best known for his roles on L'Alqueria Blanca, in which he portrayed the mayor, and Doctor Mateo.

Molina was born in San Jorge, Castellón, Valencian Community, on November 15, 1940. He died on the morning of October 4, 2014, in Valencia, Spain, at the age of 73.

== Filmography ==
=== Televisión ===
- L'Alqueria Blanca (2007–2010) on Canal 9
- Doctor Mateo (2009–2011) on Antena 3
- Yo soy Bea (2009) om Telecinco
- Hospital Central (2005) on Telecinco
- Cuéntame cómo pasó (2002) en La 1
