= Juan Antonio Cebrián =

Spanish journalist, writer, and broadcaster

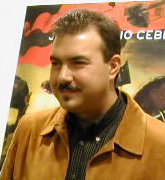
Antonio Cebrián

Juan Antonio Cebrián (1965–2007) was a Spanish journalist, writer and broadcaster. He is most recognized for his works: Night Shift and The Compass Rose.
