= Xplora =

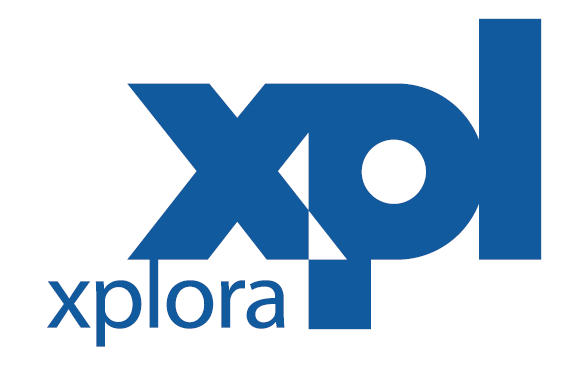
- Country: Spain
- Broadcast area: Spain; Andorra
- Headquarters: Madrid

Programming
- Language: Spanish

Ownership
- Owner: Atresmedia
- Sister channels: Antena 3 Neox; Nova; Nitro; Antena 3 HD laSexta laSexta3 laSexta HD; Gol TV

History
- Launched: 1 May 2012
- Closed: 5 May 2014

Links
- Website: www.lasexta.com

Xplora was a Spanish TV channel owned by Atresmedia. The channel started broadcasting on 1 May 2012, replacing laSexta2 due its low ratings. On 5 May 2014, the channel ceased broadcasting.

Most of its programming were documentaries and reality television.

== History ==
The channel ceased broadcasting on 5 May 2014 in DTT, as a consequence of a decision by the Supreme Court that annulled the concessions for nine channels broadcasting in DTT, because their permissions for frequencies were granted without the required public consensus and assignments system according to the Audiovisual Law.

Since 6 May 2014 the channel broadcast only online via Atresplayer.
