= Movistar CineDoc&Roll =

- Country: Spain
- Network: Movistar+

Ownership
- Owner: Telefónica

History
- Launched: 15 September 2010
- Closed: 31 July 2021
- Replaced by: Estrenos 2 por Movistar Plus+
- Former names: Movistar Xtra (2016-2018); Canal+ Xtra (2010-2016)

Links
- Website: movistarplus.es

Movistar CineDoc&Roll (formerly Movistar Xtra) was a Spanish television channel on the Movistar+ platform owned and operated by Telefónica.
