= Estil 9 =

Defunct Spanish television channel

- Country: Spain
- Broadcast area: Catalonia
- Headquarters: Barcelona

History
- Launched: 2010

Links
- Website: www.estil9.cat

Availability

Terrestrial
- Digital: Mux 33 (Barcelona)

Estil 9 was a Spanish television channel, launched in 2010 and closed in 2013. It was founded and started to broadcast on April 14, 2010. Estil 9 broadcast in Catalan. For this end, the Godó group subcontracted a slot in its multiplex to New Millennium Market to produce content for the channel (travel program Passaport, cooking shows Umamy and Plats and the health and beauty program Miralls), as well as telenovelas and fashion shows. In August and September 2011, the channel recorded an audience share of 0,2% in Catalonia.

Estil 9 closed without prior warning on January 1, 2013, being replaced by BOM in its multiplex. BOM subsequently closed on December 15, 2014.
