= Las Vegas (Corvera) =

- Parish
- Location within Spain
- Country: Spain
- Autonomous community: Asturias
- Province: Asturias
- Municipality: Corvera de Asturias

Map of Las Vegas within Corvera

Las Vegas is one of seven parishes (administrative divisions) in the Corvera de Asturias municipality, within the province and autonomous community of Asturias, in northern Spain.

The population is 7,713.

== Villages ==
- La Estrada
- Las Vegas
