= Neox (TV channel) =

Spanish television channel

- Country: Spain
- Broadcast area: Spain, reaching bordering regions via overspill of the Spanish terrestrial network

Programming
- Language: Spanish
- Picture format: 1080i HDTV

Ownership
- Owner: Atresmedia
- Sister channels: Antena 3 LaSexta; Nova; Mega; Atreseries

History
- Launched: 30 November 2005
- Former names: Antena.Neox (2005–2009); Neox 8 (2009–2010)

Links
- Website: neox.atresmedia.com

Availability

Terrestrial
- Spain Digital: Mux 69
- Andorra Digital: Andorra: 49

Streaming media
- Atresplayer: Neox

Neox (formerly Antena.Neox and briefly Neox 8) is a Spanish digital terrestrial television channel owned and operated by Atresmedia. Launched on 30 November 2005 alongside Nova, it was originally aimed at children and young audiences. The channel is available in Spain and Andorra and is also accessible via the Atresplayer streaming platform.

Neox primarily broadcasts children's programming during morning hours and films and series during the evening. It is particularly known for airing internationally successful American series, including The Simpsons, The Big Bang Theory, Friends, and Family Guy. The channel achieved its highest audience record on 23 May 2019, when 1,636,000 viewers tuned in to the series finale of The Big Bang Theory.

== History ==
The channel was launched as Antena.Neox in 2005 together with Antena.Nova, with the aim of strengthening the Antena 3 brand in the recently launched digital terrestrial television in Spain. At first Neox was a channel that mixed children's and youth programming.

In 2006 Antena 3 and CBS Corporation signed an agreement to broadcast content produced by CBS, Showtime and UPN, which would be programmed on Antena.Neox, Antena.Nova and Antena 3 until the Showtime and UPN brands were implemented on the Spanish television replacing Neox and Nova, however, the change was not carried out in the end due to the distribution of broadcasting rights with other Spanish channels. However, Antena 3 obtained the rights to broadcast future productions of CBS Corporation.

On 1 January 2009 Antena.Neox was renamed as Neox 8 in order to associate the channel with that logical channel number on digital terrestrial television. Finally, on 6 August 2010, it adopted the current name.

On 30 December 2011, the channel premiered "Feliz Año Neox", a special year-end program that is broadcast one day before the established date and which became an annual tradition of the channel.

On 29 June 2013, the channel introduced Neox Kidz, a children programming block that is broadcast in the morning replacing Megatrix. In May 2014, the channel added docuseries and movies to its programming due to the closure of Nitro, Xplora and la Sexta 3, in addition to adding new series and children's content to the signal.

In October 2017, the channel temporarily incorporated The Simpsons into its daytime program, because Antena 3's morning show had to be extended in its time to cover important political information at the time. Finally, in September 2018 The Simpsons began to be broadcast exclusively on Neox, completely abandoning Antena 3.

On 23 May 2019, the channel achieved its best audience record to date when 1,636,000 people tuned in to the final episode of The Big Bang Theory, which meant a 9.8% audience at the time and an average of 4.4% daily audience.

In December 2020, Neox Kidz became Kidz, focusing on Atresplayer with on-demand content and a 24h web TV. On 7 January 2025, the programming block Kidz has extended its hours to 10am on weekdays and 2pm at weekends by acquiring Miraculous following the closure of the Disney Channel.

== Programming ==
Generally, the channel shows children's programmes during the morning, and films and general-audience series during the evening and night hours. The channel is geared towards children aged 7 to 14, and also airs internationally successful series such as Family Guy, How I Met Your Mother, Friends, The Big Bang Theory, Two and a Half Men, The Middle and Modern Family. It also builds on Antena 3's most popular programming, such as The Simpsons and The Goldbergs. The channel is available on digital terrestrial television (TDT as it is known in Spain) as well as cable and satellite.
