= Nitro (Spanish TV channel) =

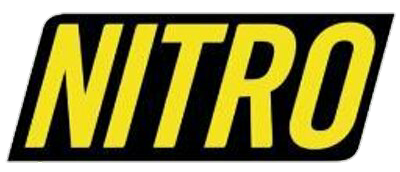
- Country: Spain
- Broadcast area: Nationwide

Programming
- Language: Spanish
- Picture format: 16:9

Ownership
- Owner: Atresmedia
- Sister channels: Antena 3 Neox; Nova; Antena 3 HD laSexta; Xplora laSexta3 laSexta HD; Gol TV

History
- Launched: August 23, 2010
- Closed: May 6, 2014

Links
- Website: http://www.antena3.com/nitro/

Availability

Terrestrial
- Vodafone (Portugal): Channel 374

Streaming media
- ZAP: Channel 27

Nitro was a Spanish television channel owned by Atresmedia. Its programming was aimed towards a male audience.

== History ==
The channel ceased broadcasting on 5 May 2014, as a consequence of a decision by the Supreme Court of Spain that annulled the concessions for nine channels broadcasting in DTT, because their permissions for frequencies were granted without the required public consensus and assignments system according to the Audiovisual Law.
