= La Sexta 3 =

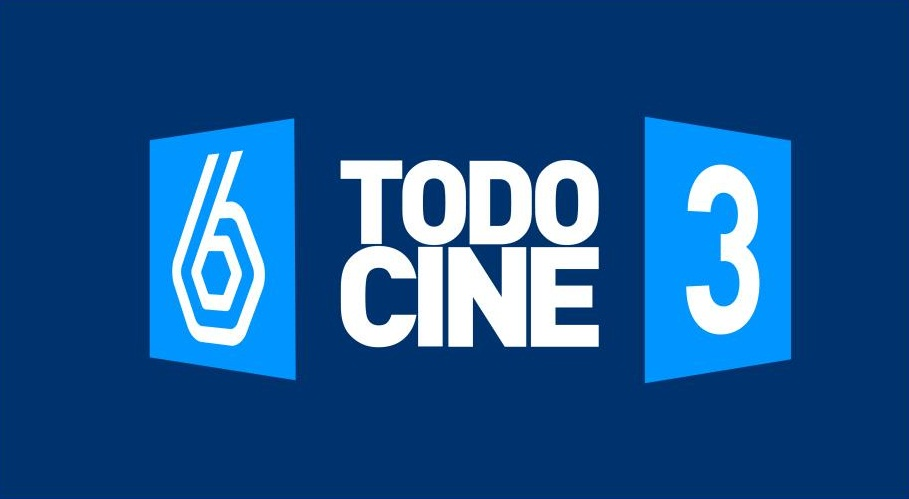
- Country: Spain
- Broadcast area: Spain
- Headquarters: Madrid

Ownership
- Owner: Atresmedia
- Sister channels: Antena 3 Neox; Nova; Nitro; Antena 3 HD laSexta; Xplora; La Sexta HD; Gol TV

History
- Launched: 1 November 2010
- Closed: 5 May 2014

Links
- Website: www.lasexta.com

laSexta 3 was a Spanish television channel, owned and operated by Atresmedia. It was founded and started to broadcast on 2010. From 2012 it only broadcast cinema. The channel ceased broadcasting on 5 May 2014, as a consequence of a decision by the Supreme Court that annulled the concessions for nine channels broadcasting in DTT, because their permissions for frequencies were granted without the required public consensus and assignments system according to the Audiovisual Law.
