= El jefe infiltrado =

- Genre: Reality television
- Created by: Stephen Lambert
- Country of origin: Spain
- Original language: Spanish
- No. of series: 1
- No. of episodes: 3 aired

Production
- Running time: 50-55 minutes

Original release
- Network: LaSexta
- Release: 3 April 2014

Related
- Undercover Boss

El jefe infiltrado is a 2014 Spanish reality television series based on the British series Undercover Boss. Each episode follows a person in a high management position at a major business who poses as an entry-level employee to discover faults in the company. The first series premiered on 3 April 2014.

== Format ==
Each episode features a high-ranking executive or the owner of a corporation going undercover as an entry-level employee in their own company. The executives alter their appearance and assume an alias and fictional back-story. The fictitious explanation given for the accompanying camera crew is that the executives are being filmed as part of a documentary about entry-level workers in a particular industry. They spend approximately one week undercover, working in various areas of their company operations, with a different job and in most cases a different location each day. They are exposed to a series of predicaments with amusing results, and invariably spend time getting to know the people who work in the company, learning about their professional and personal challenges.

At the end of their week undercover, the executives return to their true identity and request the employees they worked with individually to corporate headquarters. The bosses reveal their identity, and reward hard-working employees through campaign, promotion, or financial rewards, while other employees are given training or better working conditions.

== Episodes ==
The first series has featured 6 episodes. The series premiered on 3 April 2014.

Series	Episodes	Originally aired	
Series	Episodes	Series premiere	Series finale
1	6	3 April 2014	

=== Series 1 (2014) ===
No.	Title	"Boss"	Original release date
1	"Domino's Pizza España"	Jesús Navarro	3 April 2014
2	"Limasa"	Diego Trinidad	3 April 2014
3	"Wogaboo"	Borja Domínguez	10 April 2014
4	"Gimnasios Altafit"	Manuel Pascual	24 April 2014
5	"Lizarran"	Elvira Durand	1 May 2014
6	"Grupo Amygo"	Jesus Rodriguez	8 May 2014
