= Nova (Spanish TV channel) =

Spanish television channel

- Country: Spain
- Broadcast area: Spain, reaching bordering regions via overspill of the Spanish terrestrial network

Programming
- Language: Spanish
- Picture format: 1080i HDTV

Ownership
- Owner: Atresmedia
- Sister channels: Antena 3 LaSexta; Neox; Mega; Atreseries

History
- Launched: 30 November 2005
- Former names: Antena.Nova (2005–2009); Nova 9 (2009–2010)

Links
- Website: nova.atresmedia.com

Availability

Terrestrial
- Digital: Mux 69

Nova is a Spanish television channel operated by Atresmedia. The network runs 24 hours a day in the Spanish language. The service is aimed at women, with the schedule reflecting this aim. Lifestyle programmes such as cooking shows are normally screened during the day. In the evening, films and some series are shown, and around midnight, Poker is screened. The network is available on digital terrestrial television (TDT as it is known in Spain) as well as via cable and satellite.

== History ==
The channel was launched as Antena.Nova in 2005 together with Antena.Neox, with the aim of strengthening the Antena 3 brand in the recently launched digital terrestrial television in Spain. Antena.Nova was the first Spanish DTT channel aimed at a female audience.

In 2006, Antena 3 and CBS Corporation signed an agreement to broadcast content produced by CBS, Showtime and UPN, which would be programmed on Antena.Neox, Antena.Nova and Antena 3 until the Showtime and UPN brands were implemented on the Spanish television replacing Neox and Nova, however, the change was not carried out in the end due to the distribution of broadcasting rights with other Spanish channels. However, Antena 3 obtained the rights to broadcast future productions of CBS Corporation.

On 1 January 2009, Antena.Nova was renamed as Nova 9 in order to associate the channel with that logical channel number on digital terrestrial television, with Nova the Latin word for "nine". Finally, on 6 August 2010, it adopted the current name. In 2011 the channel began to have competition after the launch of Divinity, owned by Mediaset España.

In May 2014, the channel added docuseries and movies to its programming due to the closure of Nitro, Xplora and la Sexta 3.

In 2017 the channel incorporated in its grid Turkish television dramas to complement the offer of Latin American soap operas.

In June 2020, Nova managed to be the most watched thematic channel on Spanish DTT. In July 2020, it achieved its best figure by achieving 3.0% of the average monthly audience.

== Programming ==
Nova's programming is aimed at a female audience between 18 and 44 years old. The grill is distinguished by the broadcast of series, Latin American and Turkish soap operas, movies, and decoration and cooking programs.

Title	Premiere date	Ref.
Telenovelas
Amor bravío	26 September 2018	
La ley del corazón	29 October 2018	
Sila	28 November 2018	
A que no me dejas	17 Diciembre 2018	
Avenida Brasil	9 January 2019	
De que te quiero, te quiero	14 January 2019	
Medcezir	21 January 2019	
La gata	13 February 2019	
Mi adorable maldición	1 March 2019	
Madre	24 March 2019	
Yo soy Betty, la fea	8 April 2019	
