= Atresmedia =

Spanish media group

Coordinates: 40.555°N 3.618°W

Atresmedia Corporación de Medios de Comunicación, S.A.

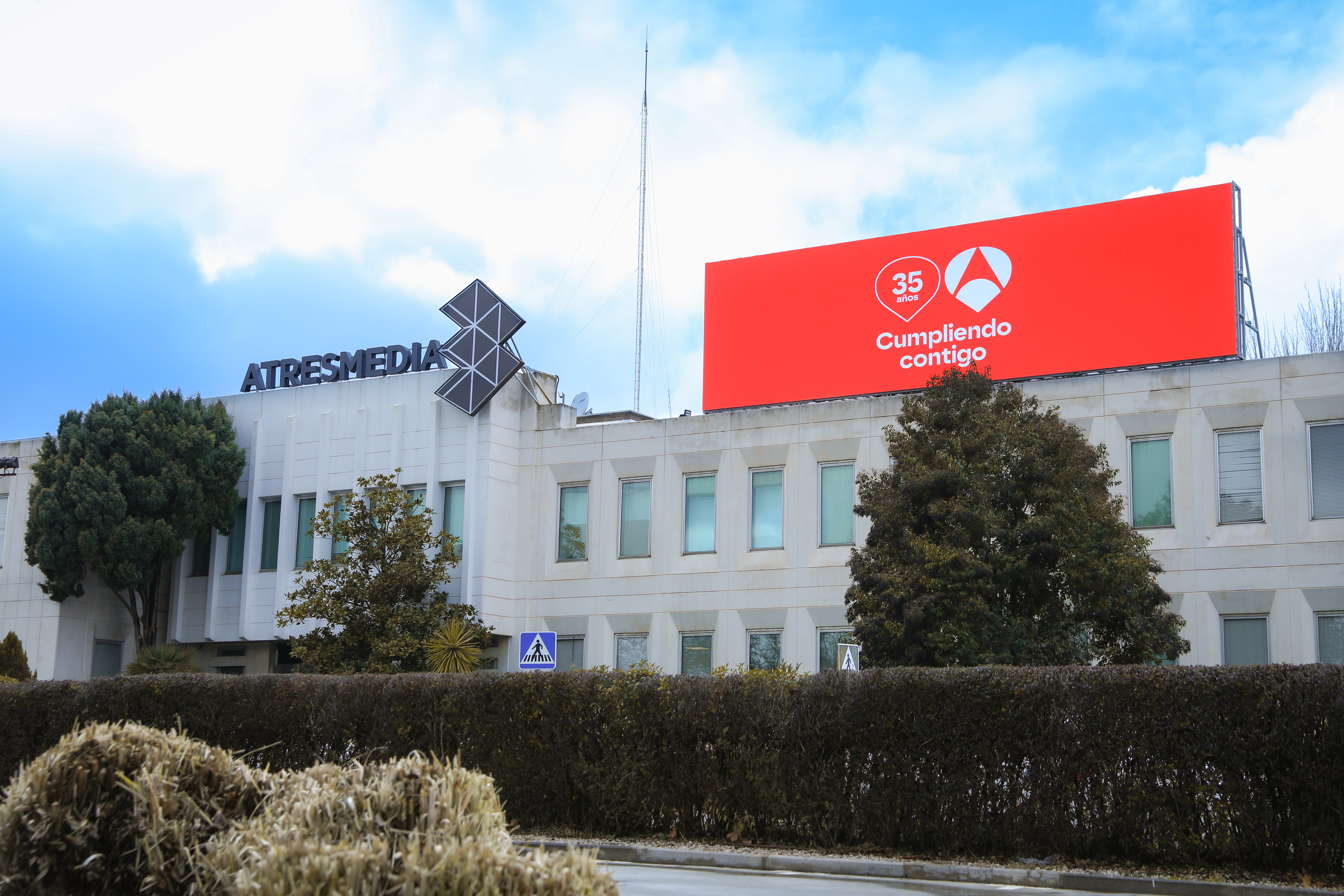
- Headquarters in San Sebastián de los Reyes
- Trade name: Atresmedia
- Formerly: Antena 3 de Televisión S.A. (1989-2013); Grupo Antena 3 (1998-2013)
- Type: Sociedad Anónima
- Traded as: BMAD: A3M
- Industry: Mass media
- Predecessor: Gestora de Inversiones Audiovisuales La Sexta
- Founded: 25 December 1989 (as Antena 3 de Televisión); 6 March 2013 (as Atresmedia)
- Headquarters: Av. Isla Graciosa 13, 28703, San Sebastián de los Reyes, Community of Madrid, Spain
- Key people: José Creuheras, President; Silvio González Moreno, CEO
- Services: Television, radio, online, advertising
- Revenue: ▲€1.0 billion (2016)
- Operating income: ▼€651 million (2009)
- Net income: ▲€129 million (2016)
- Total equity: € 158,334,600.00 (2006)
- Owner: Planeta Corporación S.R.L. (41.7 %); RTL Group (19.2%); Brandes Investment Partners, L.P. (3.0%)
- Number of employees: 2,527 (31 December 2019)
- Divisions: Atresmedia Televisión; Atresmedia Radio; Atresmedia Cine; Atresmedia Digital; Atresmedia Studios; Atresmedia Diversificación; Atresmedia Publicidad; Atresmedia Eventos; Atresmedia Foundation Corporate, Financial and Corporate Responsibility Information; Atresmedia Training
- Website: atresmediacorporacion.com

Atresmedia Corporación de Medios de Comunicación, S.A., previously Grupo Antena 3, is a Spanish media group, present in the television, radio and filmmaking industries. Significant shareholders include Grupo Planeta and Bertelsmann via RTL Group.

On 6 March 2013, Grupo Antena 3 was renamed Atresmedia, thereby Antena 3 de Televisión changed to Atresmedia Televisión.

== Divisions ==
=== Television ===
Atresmedia operates several channels through Atresmedia Televisión of which Antena 3 and LaSexta are the flagship channels. In addition to these channels, Atresmedia Televisión operates three other national terrestrial channels - Neox, Nova and Mega. Until 5 May 2014 Xplora, Nitro, LaSexta3 were also broadcast. In December 2015, Atresmedia Televisión started to air Atreseries, an HD national terrestrial channel centred on fiction TV series.

Channel	Emissions start	Image format	Availability
Antena 3 General channel	25 January 1990 (HD: 28 August 2007)	HD	Nationwide and International (As Antena 3 Internacional for Selected Europe Countries, United States, and Latin America Spanish Speaking Countries)
laSexta; General channel	27 March 2006 (HD: 1 November 2009)	HD	Spain
Neox; Entertainment channel	30 November 2005 (HD: 1 December 2015)	HD	Spain
Nova; Entertainment channel	30 November 2005 (HD: 1 December 2015)	HD	Spain
Mega; Entertainment channel	1 July 2015 (HD: 1 December 2015)	HD	Spain
Atreseries; Entertainment channel	22 December 2015	HD	Spain and International (as Atreseries International Feed for Selected Europe Countries, United States, and Latin America Spanish Speaking Countries)

=== Radio ===
Atresmedia operates three radio stations through Atresmedia Radio - Onda Cero, Europa FM and Melodía FM.

=== Film ===
Atresmedia Cine is the division responsible for producing film content. Atresmedia Cine is one of the most prominent Spanish and Latin American film producers. It was created in 2000.

=== Publishing ===
Atresmedia Publicidad is the division responsible for producing advertising material.

=== Event Management ===
Atresmedia Eventos is the division responsible for management of public events.

=== Web Content ===
Atresmedia Digital is the division responsible for management of internet content.

The video-on-demand streaming service owned and operated by Atresmedia is Atresplayer (also stylized as ATRESplayer). In addition to content from the free-to-air linear television channels, it offers access to exclusive and original content for Premium subscribers, access to additional foreign serials and telenovelas for Novelas Nova subscribers, and access to original content under the Flooxer brand.

== Corporate affairs ==
=== Headquarters ===
Atresmedia's corporate headquarters are located on the outskirts of Madrid, in the municipality of San Sebastián de los Reyes. The building complex covers 94,000 m^{2} (1,010,000 sq ft).

=== Chairmen ===
- 1989–1994: Javier Godó
- 1994–1998: Antonio Asensio
- 1998–2001: José María Mas Millet
- 2001–2003: Enrique Álvarez
- 2003–2016: José Manuel Lara Bosch
- 2016–present: José Creuheras

=== Shareholding ===
The majority shareholders of Atresmedia are Grupo Planeta-DeAgostini, S.L. (44.54%) and UFA Film- und Fernsehen GmbH (20.49%).
