= Salvados =

Television program

- Genre: Infoshow
- Written by: Sergio Castro; Jordi Gago; Santiago González; Xavier Navarro; Pepe Tienda
- Directed by: Jordi Évole; Ramón Lara
- Presented by: Jordi Évole
- Narrated by: David Picó
- Country of origin: Spain
- Original language: Spanish
- No. of seasons: 12
- No. of episodes: 212

Production
- Executive producers: Jordi Évole; Ramón Lara
- Running time: 60 minutes approx.
- Production company: El Terrat

Original release
- Network: laSexta
- Release: February 24, 2008 – present

Salvados ("Saved") is a Spanish news show hosted and directed from 2008 to 2019 by Jordi Évole and later by Gonzo. It airs Sunday nights on laSexta.

== History ==
=== Salvados por la campaña and first season ===
Salvados started in 2008 as Salvados por la campaña ("Saved by the campaign", a play on the Spanish title of teen sitcom Saved by the Bell), a two-episode special show covering, in a comedic tone, the campaign for the 2008 Spanish general election. Back then, host Jordi Évole still went by the nickname El Follonero ("The Troublemaker") from his days as a collaborator on Andreu Buenafuente's late-night show.

After the success of Salvados por la campaña, Évole started recording more Salvados por... themed programmes that would be aired on laSexta over the next five months.

==== Salvados por la Iglesia controversy ====
In this two-episode installment, El Follonero visited Opus Dei's Torreciudad Shrine, acted as altar boy in a Catholic mass and went to Vatican City to ironically pledge for the canonization of Federico Jiménez Losantos (one of Évole's most ferocious detractors at the time) and attempt to present Rodolfo Chikilicuatre's guitar to Pope Benedict XVI.

Salvados por la Iglesia didn't sit well with several Catholic associations such as Hazte Oír, that accused the show of being a direct attack to Catholic Church and called advertisers to pull their publicity from the show.

This wasn't the last time Salvados openly criticised the Church, as it denounced, this time in a more serious tone, the privileges of the Catholic Church in Spain in the episode Que Dios te lo pague ("May God pay you for it", aired on April 23, 2012).

=== Second season ===
After being renewed by laSexta for a second season, Salvados became a weekly show. The channel then presented the program as "a mixture of daring and ironic reports, which takes reality humorously, with the target of entertaining." Évole stated in an interview that "the new Salvados will issue different challenges to paint images of different realities with an ironic view, asking the questions nobody asks, with the secret collaboration of anonymous infiltrators, strange situations and near-impossible interviews."

During this season the show featured the following sections:

- El temazo del Follonero: Jordi Évole conducted a report about ongoing news or people related to them.
- Infiltrados: Anonymous actors were challenged to sneak into important events.
- Cara a cara de perfil: Two antagonistic people answered the same questions.
- Entrevista en profundidad: A celebrity answered one single question from El Follonero.
- Apatruyoyando: Évole chatted about different topics with former Gran Hermano contestant Carlos Navarro El Yoyas, as they rode a car across L'Hospitalet de Llobregat.

In November Évole was threatened by extremist right-wing political party FE-La Falange after the episode aired on occasion of 20-N, which featured Évole depositing a bouquet of flowers with the colors of the Republican flag on Francisco Franco's tomb at Valle de los Caídos.

=== Third season and beyond ===
All sections from the second season disappeared as Salvados gradually ditched its comedic tone and started focusing on news and recent or ongoing events, and along the way earned three times the Iris Award for best news program, presented by the Spanish Television Academy. As a result of this change, Évole (no longer referred to as El Follonero) has managed to interview on the show people such as Pope Francis or Catalan president Artur Mas and former politician Jaume Matas, who was facing several accusations of corruption. This interview was included by the judge in the files of the Nóos case.

One of the most notable episodes in the show's history was Los olvidados ("The forgotten"), which brought back to the news the Valencia Metro derailment from 2006 by uncovering several irregularities around the incident and an alleged manipulation from the Generalitat Valenciana autonomous government of the news about it aired by media group Ràdio Televisió Valenciana and witnesses from the investigation commission. The episode, based on information provided by Valencia-based production company Barret Films, reached a 15.8% share rating with more than 3.3 million viewers and resulted in public mobilizations that made the opposing parties at Corts Valencianes demand a re-opening of the incident investigations.

== Accolades ==
- Premios Iris: best news show (2011, 2012 and 2013) and best reporter (Jordi Évole, 2011, 2012 and 2013)
- Antena de Oro for Jordi Évole (2010)
- Premios Ondas:
  - 2008: Innovation and television quality (Salvados por la campaña)
  - 2011: Best television host (Jordi Évole)
  - 2013: Best coverage or news special

== Recognition ==
In July 2013, The New York Times praised Évole's work on Salvados, to the point of comparing him to American filmmaker Michael Moore. The article highlighted the success of his investigation of the Valencia Metro derailment and considered that the program had turned the host into "a prominent Spanish voice at a time of economic crisis". Évole stated on the interview that he'd had "complete freedom to cover what I want", and added: "I can tell you that Salvados is a program which doesn't get applauded by the Socialists."
