= LaSexta =

Spanish television channel

La Sexta
- Country: Spain
- Broadcast area: Spain and Andorra, reaching bordering regions via overspill of the Spanish terrestrial network
- Headquarters: San Sebastián de los Reyes (Madrid)

Programming
- Language: Spanish
- Picture format: 1080i HDTV

Ownership
- Owner: Atresmedia
- Sister channels: Antena 3 Neox; Nova; Mega; Atreseries

History
- Launched: 1 April 2001; 25 years ago (as Beca TV); 25 November 2005; 20 years ago (as LaSexta) (test broadcast); 27 March 2006; 20 years ago (official broadcast)
- Replaced: Beca TV
- Closed: 21 July 2003 (as Beca TV)

Links
- Website: www.lasexta.com

Availability

Terrestrial
- Digital terrestrial television: Mux 34 (Madrid); Mux 27 (Barcelona); Mux 36 (Andorra)

Streaming media
- Atresplayer: Watch live

La Sexta (Spanish: [la ˈseksta]; lit. 'The Sixth'; stylised as laSexta) is a privately owned Spanish free-to-air television channel that was founded on 18 March 2001 as Beca TV and began broadcasting on 1 April 2001. By 21 July 2003, the channel ran into debt and was shut down, but two years later in 2005, it was replaced by a new channel called La Sexta that began test transmissions on 25 November 2005, and a year later, it started broadcasting officially on 27 March 2006. The channel's programming is generalist, however, there is an emphasis on humour and entertainment. The channel broadcasts a large amount of American and sports programming, and in recent years it has covered political events such as elections, including extensive debate through three key programmes: Al rojo vivo (Red-hot), El objetivo (The Lens) and Salvados (Saved). The political alignment of its news and debate programmes is left-leaning.

In 2012 the channel was acquired by Grupo Antena 3, later named Atresmedia.

== Programming ==
LaSexta's programming from Monday to Friday is mainly based on information and debate spaces, although more general programming such as films, reality shows or reporting programmes are broadcast at night. During the weekend, the channel reduces its news and debate programmes to broadcast reruns of previous programmes or films.

Some original programming of LaSexta includes: BuenAgente, El Intermedio, El jefe infiltrado, Pesadilla en la cocina, Qué vida más triste, The Refugees, Salvados, Sé lo que hicisteis..., SMS (Sin Miedo a Soñar) and Zapeando.

Other programming also includes: Emma's Theatre, My Name Is Earl, The Office, Law & Order, World of Polli, The Sopranos, NCIS, The King of Queens, Monsuno, Entourage, Pierre the Painter, How I Met Your Mother, Family Guy, Futurama, Bones, 30 Rock, Arthur, The Mentalist, Eleventh Hour, The Red Green Show, Prison Break and The Walking Dead.

== Production ==
La Sexta currently broadcasts in 16:9 for most programming although they still use 4:3 for a minority of programming including films and older TV series.

== Logos ==
Used from 2005 to 2008	Used from 2008 to 2016	Used from 2016 to 2024	Used from 2024
2005–2008	2008–2016	2016–2024	Since 2024

== History ==
La Sexta was first founded as a TV production company on 25 November 2005 when it got its broadcast licence. It began testing the broadcast on 12 December, shortly before knowing the analogue frequencies assigned to Madrid and Barcelona.

On 23 December, broadcasts started in Madrid and Barcelona, expanding later to all of Spain.

Starting on 23 January 2006, they began broadcasting a promotional video. 20 February marked the start of content emissions testing. Actual broadcasts started with documentaries (Champions, Natura) and programmes dedicated to tuning, like "Tuning Mania". From 22 February, La Sexta began broadcasting twelve hours of programming every day.

On 2 March, a football match between Croatia and Argentina was the occasion of the first live broadcast. Five days before the actual date, José Miguel Contreras announced the official starting date, 27 March, on the Círculo de Bellas Artes.

On February 14, 2024, Atresmedia switched to HD-only broadcasting, ending the coexistence of standard definition (SD) and high definition (HD) versions. The high-definition feed originally launched on August 22, 2010.
