= Antena 3 (Spanish TV channel) =

Private Spanish generalist television network

- Logo used since 2025

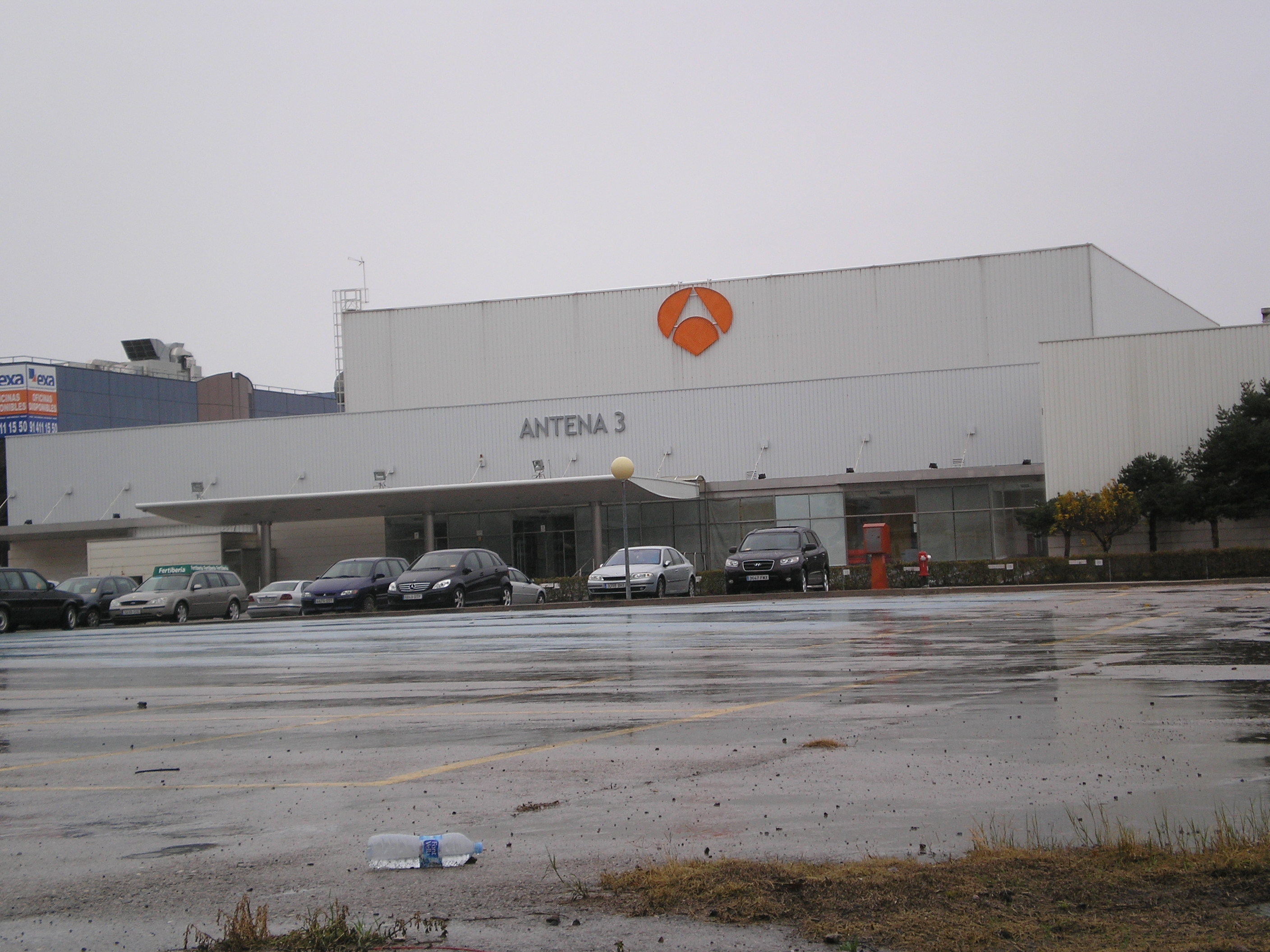
- Country: Spain
- Broadcast area: Spain and Andorra, reaching bordering regions via overspill of the Spanish terrestrial network
- Headquarters: San Sebastián de los Reyes (Madrid)

Programming
- Language: Spanish
- Picture format: 1080i HDTV; 2160p UHD

Ownership
- Owner: Atresmedia
- Sister channels: LaSexta; Neox; Nova; Mega; Atreseries; Antena 3 Internacional; Atrescine

History
- Launched: 25 December 1989; 36 years ago (experimental transmissions); 25 January 1990; 36 years ago (official launch)

Links
- Website: antena3.com

Availability

Terrestrial
- Digital terrestrial television: LaSexta; Mux 34 (Madrid); Mux 27 (Barcelona); Mux 45 (Andorra)

Streaming media
- Atresplayer: Watch live

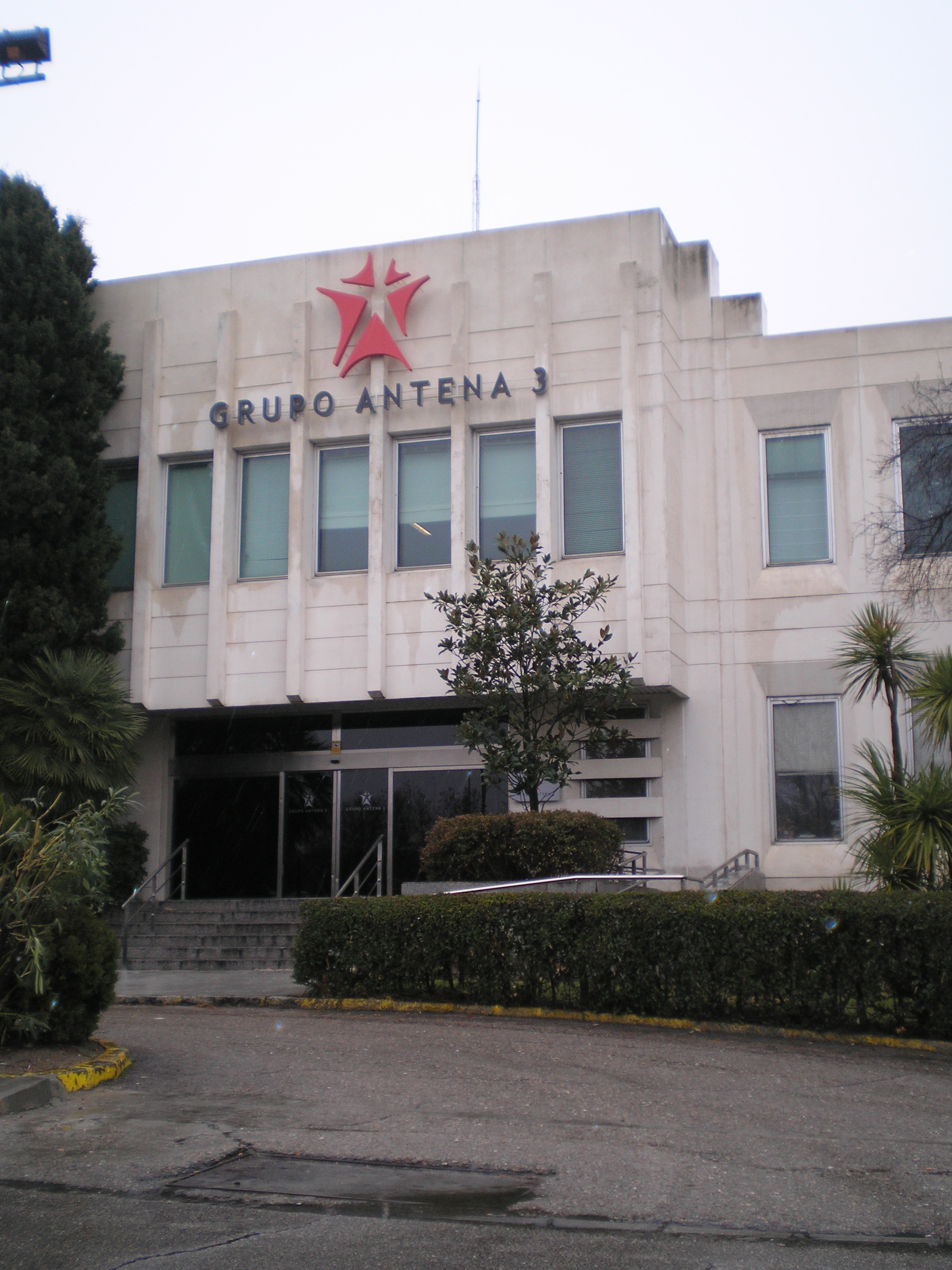
Antena 3 headquarters

Antena 3 (Antena Tres) is a Spanish terrestrial television channel and part of Atresmedia, of which it is the flagship station. Its current headquarters are located in San Sebastián de los Reyes.

Some of the most popular programmes broadcast by Antena 3 include Aquí no hay quien viva, Física o Química, El barco, Los Protegidos, The Simpsons, El Hormiguero and El Internado. Some of its programmes, such as Física o Química, Money Heist and Your Face Sounds Familiar, gained international success and recognition, leading to many duplicate programmes being produced worldwide.

Antena 3 is generally listed as the third channel on television sets throughout Spain, except in certain autonomous communities where the regional station occupies channel number 3.

== History ==
It was launched on Christmas Day, 25 December 1989 when it began test transmissions, and then later, it commenced its official broadcasts throughout Spain exactly one month later on 25 January 1990, with a programme fronted by journalist Miguel Ángel Nieto, thus becoming Spain's first nationwide private television station.

In July 1997, Grupo Zeta sold its stake to Telefónica; José María Mas became president and José Manuel Lorenzo director general. During the Telefónica period, Antena 3 joined the Vía Digital project.

In 2002, Antena 3 became the first Spanish private television channel to broadcast the FIFA World Cup.

The channel presented a new brand identity on 24 January 2025, introduced on 25 January, the 35th anniversary of its regular broadcasts, creating a modern and "timeless" identity. A new custom typeface was created.

== Programming ==
The biggest winners for the channel are The Simpsons, Velvet, DEC, El Diario (a daily talk show run by Sandra Daviú) and the Noticias (particularly the evening edition run by Matías Prats).

Antena 3 dramas and sitcoms in the past and present include Manos a la obra, Canguros, La casa de los líos, Los lahkldrones van a la oficina, Hermanos de leche, Vecinos, Cañas y barro, Compañeros, Un paso adelante, Policías, Fuego, El pantano, Ada madrina, Dime que me quieres, Lleno por favor, ¿Quién da la vez?, Farmacia de guardia, Menudo es mi padre, Nada es para siempre, Aquí no hay quien viva, and Los hombres de Paco.

== Antena 3 Internacional ==
Antena 3 Internacional is a pay television channel owned by Atresmedia Internacional, with distribution handled by MVS Comunicaciones. The channel serves the Americas (including the United States, Mexico and Central America), the Caribbean and Europe including Spain, Andorra and Gibraltar. Antena 3 Internacional was founded in 1995. The channel retransmits programmes from the domestic Antena 3 schedule and other programmes from Atresmedia channels (LaSexta, Neox, Nova, Mega, Atreseries, and Atrescine) along with live news programming, but due to some right issues with others who might hold rights to their shows in the Americas, some programming might air on a delay of several months or only after its original run has been completed.

== Logos ==
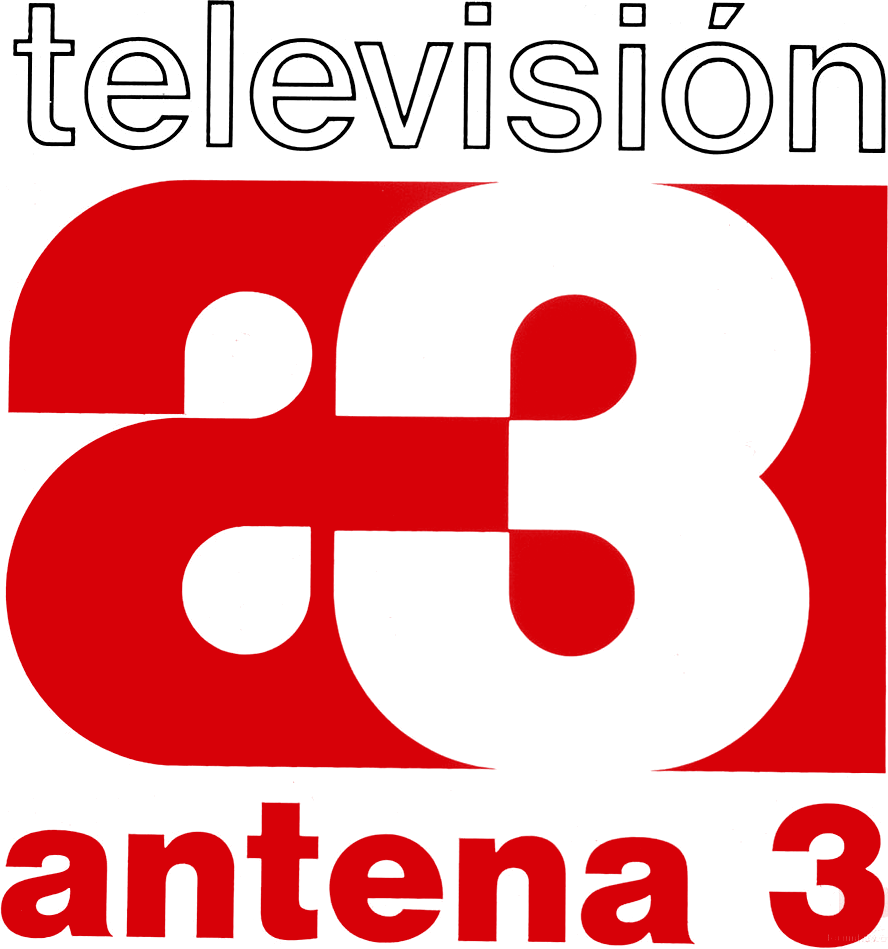
1989–1993
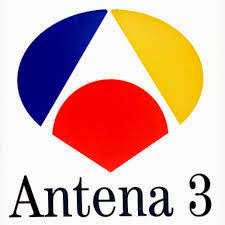
1993–2004
2004–2017
2017–2025

2025–present

== Fake Gdim Izig photos scandal (Western Sahara) ==
Antena 3 was fined €215,000 by the Court of First Instance of Brussels for repeatedly misusing fake photos of homicide to illustrate what the channel presented as Moroccan police brutality at Gdim Izig (Laayoune) in Western Sahara. The pictures showed the bodies of victims of a quadruple homicide in Casablanca. The Rachidi family, whose relatives' photos have been "repeatedly misused in bad faith", is still awaiting for "a public apology" from Antena 3.

== See also ==
- Atresmedia
- RTL Group
