= List of programs broadcast by LaSexta =

This is a list of programs on the TV network LaSexta.

Original title	Genre	Performers / hosts	Years
A mi manera	Reality show	David DeMaría, Marta Sánchez, Sole Giménez; Nacho García Vega, Antonio Carmona, Mikel Erentxun and Manolo Tena	2016
A pelo	Talk show	Joaquín Reyes and Raúl Cimas	2006-2007
Al rojo vivo	Talk show	Antonio García Ferreras	2011- ¿?
Alessandra... sólo sexo	Talk show	Alessandra Rampolla	2007
Algo pasa con Marta	Talk show	Marta Torné	2010-2011
Alguien tenía que decirlo	Comedy	Dani Rovira and David Broncano	2012
Ambulancias, en el corazón de la ciudad	Reality show		2018
Anatomía de ...	Documentary	Mamen Mendizábal	2023- ¿?
Animales Secundarios	Comedy	Especialistas Secundarios	2009
Anónimos	Comedy	Ángel Llàcer	2007
El Aprendiz	Reality show	Luis Bassat	2009
Apuesta en 20"	Game show	Javier Martín	2006-2008
Aruser@s	Variety show	Alfonso Arús	2018- ¿?
Aruser@s Weekend	Variety show	Alfonso Arús	2022-2023
Así nos va	Comedy	Florentino Fernández and Anna Simon	2013
Auténticos	Reality show	Alberto Chicote	2020
Batalla de restaurantes	Cooking show	Alberto Chicote	2024-¿?
Bichos y Cía	Vídeos	Michelle Jenner	2006-2007
Brigada Policial	Reality show	Juan Ramón Lucas	2006
Buenafuente	Late night	Andreu Buenafuente	2007-2011
BuenAgente	Sitcom	Antonio Molero	2011
Caiga Quien Caiga	Infoshow	Arturo Valls, Manel Fuentes and Juanra Bonet	2008
El camino a casa	Talk show	Albert Espinosa	2023-¿?
Carretera y manta	Documentary	Jesús Cintora	2018-2019
Cazadores de Trolls	Reality show	Pedro García Aguado	2017
Cazaherederos	Variety show	Jalis de la Serna	2022
Celebrities	Variety show	Martina Klein	2008
El Club de Flo	Talent show	Florentino Fernández	2006-2007
El Club de la comedia	Comedy	Eva Hache, Alexandra Jiménez and Ana Morgade	2011-2017
Cocina con Bruno	Cooking show	Bruno Oteiza	2007-2008
Cocineros españoles por el mundo	Documentary		2014
Con Hache de Eva	Comedy	Eva Hache	2011
Comandancias	Reality show	-	2015
Conspiranoicos	News	Joaquín Castellón	2024-¿?
Constructor a la fuga	Reality show	Antonio Hernández	2015
Crematorio	Drama series	José Sancho	2012
De Patitas en la Calle	Reality show	Carolina Ferre	2008
Debate al límite	Talk show	Mamen Mendizábal	2010
Dentro de...	Documentary	Cristina Pedroche	2017
Desmontando	Documentary	Boris Izaguirre	2023-¿?
Diario del Analista Catódico	Videos	Agustín Jiménez	2006-2008
Dímelo al oído	Dating show	Eva González e Iván Sánchez	2006
Divididos	Game show	Luján Argüelles	2020
¿Dónde estabas entonces?	Documental	Ana Pastor	2017-2021
Elegidos	Investigative	Juan Ramón Lucas	2006
En el aire	Late night	Andreu Buenafuente	2013-2015
En un tic tac	Home & living show	Antxine Olano	2007
Encarcelados	Reality show	Alejandra Andrade and Jalis de la Serna	2013
Encuentros inesperados	Talk show	Mamen Mendizábal	2022- ¿?
Enviado Especial	Investigative	Jalis de la Serna	2016-2019
Equipo de investigación	Investigative	Gloria Serra	2013- ¿?
La Escuela de decoración	Variety show	Lorenzo Meazza	2015
Eso lo hago yo	Talent show	Carlos Sobera	2016
Estados Alterados Maitena	Sitcom	María Adánez	2008-2009
Expediente Marlasca	Investigative	Manuel Marlasca	2017-2018
Fenómenos	Late night	Eva González	2007
Fuera del mapa	Travel	Alberto Chicote	2021-2022
Gabinete de crisis	Talk show	Emilio Doménech	2023-¿?
Generación Ni-Ni	Reality show		2010
Genercación TOP	Game show	Ana Pastor	2024
La Gran ilusión	Variety show	El mago Pop	2016
Habitación 623	Talk show	Olga Viza	2006
Hoy cocinas tú	Cooking show	Eva Arguiñano	2006-2009
El Intermedio	Comedy	El Gran Wyoming	2006- ¿?
El Intermedio: International Edition	Comedy	Dani Mateo	2013
La Investigación en 2D	Talk show	Helena Resano	2006-2007
Los Irrepetibles	Comedy	Emilio Aragón	2006-2007
La Isla	Reality show	Pedro García Aguado	2017
Jefe infiltrado, El	Reality show		2014-2023
Jugones	Sports	Josep Pedrerol	2013- ¿?
Juicio de parejas	Talk show	Yolanda Vázquez	2006
La Sexta clave	Investigative	Rodrigo Blázquez	2020- ¿?
La Sexta columna	Investigative		2012- ¿?
La Sexta noche	Talk show	Iñaki López	2013-2022
La Sexta Noticias	News	Helena Resano, Mamen Mendizábal; Cristina Villanueva and Cristina Saavedra	2006- ¿?
LaSexta Xplica	Talk show	José Yélamo	2022- ¿?
Lab: Tal como somos	Science		2013-2014
Liarla Pardo	Variety show	Cristina Pardo	2018-2021
Lo de Évole	Talk show	Jordi Évole	2020- ¿?
Los Hygge. Una pareja muy natural	Reality show	Patricia Pérez	2017
Los reyes del empeño	Docu-reality	Marta Torres	2014
Malas compañías	Comedy	Manel Fuentes	2009
Malas compañías	Investigative	Cristina Pardo	2017-2018
Más vale sábado	Variety show	Boris Izaguirre and Adela González	2023-¿?
Más vale tarde	Talk show	Mamen Mendizábal, Cristina Pardo and Iñaki López	2012- ¿?
El Millonario	Game show	Nuria Roca	2012
Millonario anónimo	Reality show		2014
Minuto y resultado	Sports	Patxi Alonso	2007-2012
MP 6	Variety show	-	2006
Mucho que perder, poco que ganar	Game show	Anabel Alonso	2011
Mujeres Ricas	Reality show	Mar Segura	2010
El Muro infernal	Game show	Julián Iantzi	2008
No me digas que no te gusta el fútbol	Sports	Juanma López Iturriaga	2006-2008
No sabe, no contesta	Game show	Miki Nadal	2006-2008
No te olvides de la canción	Music	Ángel Llàcer	2008
El Objetivo	News	Ana Pastor	2013-2022
Palo y astilla	Talk show	Mamen Mendizábal	2021-
Periodistas Fútbol Club	Comedy	Dani Mateo and Ricardo Castella	2010
Pesadilla en la cocina	Cooking show	Alberto Chicote	2012- ¿?
El Piano	Music	Ruth Lorenzo	2024
Planeta Finito	Documentary		2006-2007
Pocholo Ibiza '06	Reality show	Pocholo Martínez-Bordiú	2006-2007
Policías en acción	Reality show		2013-2016
El Precio de los alimentos	Science	Alberto Chicote	2015
El Programa de Berto	Comedy	Berto Romero	2009
¡Qué más quisiera yo!	Comedy		2009
Qué vida más triste	Sitcom	Borja Pérez	2008-2010
¿Quién vive ahí?	Variety show		2010-2011
Refugees	Drama series	Natalia Tena	2015
La roca	Variety show	Nuria Roca	2021-
Sabías a lo que venías	Talk show	Santiago Segura	2007
Sabor de hogar	Home & living show	Antxine Olano	2007
Salud a la carta	Variety show	Txumari Alfaro and Bruno Oteiza	2008-2009
Salvados	Investigative	Jordi Évole and Fernando González «Gonzo»	2008- ¿?
Scoop	Investigative	Mamen Mendizábal	2018
Sé lo que hicisteis...	Comedy	Patricia Conde and Ángel Martín	2006-2011
Sexto sentido	Talk show	Mamen Mendizábal, Helena Resano and Cristina Villanueva	2006-2007
El Show de Cándido	Reality show	Julián Weich	2006
SMS: Sin Miedo a Soñar	Drama series	-	2006-2007
Sports Center	Sports	Patxi Alonso	2006
Taxi	Game show	Miki Nadal	2013
Tarde Directo	Variety show	Cristina Villanueva	2011
¿Te lo vas a comer?	Cooking show	Alberto Chicote	2018-2023
Las Tentaciones de Eva	Cooking show	Eva Arguiñano	2007
Terrat Pack	Comedy	Andreu Buenafuente	2009
Tesoro o cacharro	Quiz show	Iñaki López	2025
Ticket	Variety show	Ruth Jiménez	2006
La Tira	Comedy	Eva González, Raúl Cano, María León	2008-2010
Todos ahhh 100	Education	Josep Tomás	2006-2009
Top Trending Tele	Zapping		2013-2014
Tor	Docu-reality show		2025
Traffic TV	Zapping		2006-2007
Tres en raya	Game show	Carolina Ferre	2007
Tú sí que sí	Talent show	Cristina Pedroche	2017
El Último mono	Comedy	Manu Sánchez	2015
Un país de chiste	Comedy	Óscar Terol	2006
La Ventana Indiscreta	Videos	Pilar Rubio	2007-2008
El Vídeo del millón de euros	Game show	Yolanda Ramos	2006
¿Y tú qué sabes?	Game show	Óscar Terol	2015-2016
Zapeando	Comedy	Frank Blanco and Dani Mateo	2013- ¿?
