= María Gómez García de la Banda =

Spanish journalist

María Gómez
- Born: María Gómez García de la Banda; 16 February 1987 (age 39); Madrid, Spain
- Occupation: Journalist
- Years active: 2010–present

María Gómez García de la Banda (born February 16, 1987, in Madrid, Spain) is a Spanish journalist, literary author, and television and radio presenter. She hosts TVE's Enred@d@s, contributes to La Sexta's Zapeando, RNE's Tarde lo que tarde, and Los 40's morning radio show Anda ya.

== Career ==
=== Formation ===
María Gómez has a degree in Advertising and Public Relations, a degree in Strategic Planning and Advertising Creativity from Pompeu Fabra University in Barcelona, and a degree in journalism from Carlos III University in Madrid.

=== Radio ===
Her career as a journalist began at Cadena SER, in Madrid, where she has been working since 2010. She has worked as a producer and editor on programs such as A vivir que son dos días, Acento Robinson, El Mundo Today, Si amanece nos vamos or La vida moderna. She has also collaborated in different formats of the radio station M80 Radio, such as Morning80.

In 2014, she makes the transition to M80 Radio, where she co-hosts the morning show 80 y la madre with José Antonio Ponseti for two seasons. In 2016, she co-hosts the hour of culture in the wake-up show Arriba España with Juan Luis Cano for one season, also on M80 Radio.

She has created, directed and presented her own radio project: XXI Gramos. A documentary radio program for Cadena SER. In addition, she has worked on the summer edition of La Ventana on the same radio station since 2015.

In 2017, she joins the Los 40 team of the morning show Anda ya, as a collaborator with a film and TV section.

She has been a contributor to the RNE magazine Tarde lo que tarde since September 2020.

In 2021, she returns to Zapeando as a collaborator and substitute presenter.

=== Television ===
On television, she started working at the TV3 news office in Madrid in 2011. Later, in 2016, she collaborated on the current affairs show Likes, on #0 by Movistar+, for a season. At the same time, she co-hosts the funny football show 90 Minuti with Miki Nadal for two seasons on Real Madrid TV.

She co-hosted the musical program A toda pantalla, with Darío Manrique, on Cuatro, where she also collaborated in the program Dani & Flo.

She has been the voice-over host of the program Bienvenidos a mi hotel, on Cuatro.

She was part of the team of journalists sent to Russia for the 2018 World Cup for Mediaset España.

During the 2018 to 2019 season, she presented Ese programa del que usted me habla on La 2 of TVE. In June 2019, it was confirmed that the program would not be renewed for a new season.

In July 2019, she began collaborating on La 1 of TVE's summer morning magazine A partir de hoy, which was renewed for the entire 2019–2020 season.

In November 2019, she participated, playing herself as a news reporter, and ended up as one of the "kidnapped" in El gran secuestro for Playz.

In September 2020, she co-presented the program La primera pregunta, together with Llus Guilera, on La 1 of TVE.

In the summer of 2021, she worked as a collaborator on the program Zapeando, on La Sexta.

Since May 2022, she has presented the program Enred@d@s on La 1 with Sara Escudero.

=== Literary work ===
In 2021, she presented Odio en las manos, her first book, a crime novel in which the protagonist is a young psychologist to whom a patient, a police officer by profession, announces a crime she intends to commit.

== Media career ==
=== Television ===
Year	Program	Channel	Role
2011–2013	El Mundo Today	El Mundo Today	Producer
2016–2017	90 minuti	Real Madrid TV	Co-host
2016; 2021–present	Zapeando	La Sexta	Contributor
2016–2017	Likes	#0	Contributor
2017	A toda pantalla	Cuatro	Host
2017–2018	Dani &amp; Flo	Cuatro	Contributor
2018	Mundial de fútbol 2018	Mediaset España	Reporter
2018–2019	Bienvenidos a mi hotel	Cuatro	Narrator
2018–2019	Ese programa del que usted me habla	La 2	Host
2019–2020	A partir de hoy	La 1	Contributor
2019	El gran secuestro	Playz	Reporter
2020	La pr1mera pregunta	La 1	Host
2021	Zapeando	La Sexta	Substitute host
2021-2022	Colgados del aro	YouTube	Contributor
2022	La noche de los Oscar	#0 por M+ and Estrenos por M+	Host
2022	La alfombra roja (94.ª edición de los Oscar)	Estrenos por M+	Host
2022	Ceremonia de los Oscar (94.ª edición)	Estrenos por M+	Host
2022	Enred@d@s	La 1	Host with Sara Escudero

=== Radio ===
Year	Program	Channel	Role
2011	Morning 80	M80 Radio	Editor
2011	Si amanece nos vamos	Cadena SER	Editor
2010–2014	A vivir que son dos días	Cadena SER	Editor
2013–2014	Acento Robinson	Cadena SER	Editor
2014–2016	La vida moderna	Cadena SER	Contributor
2014–2016	80 y la madre	M80 Radio	Co-host
2016–2018	La ventana	Cadena SER	Contributor
2016–2017	Arriba España	M80 Radio	Co-host
2016–2017	XXI gramos	Cadena SER	Broadcaster
2017–2020	Anda ya	Los 40	Contributor
2020–present	Tarde lo que tarde	Radio Nacional	Contributor

== Recognitions ==
In 2017, Forbes Spain magazine included her in its 30 under 30 list of the most influential young professionals in Spain, also being the presenter of the gala.
