= Lorena Castell =

Spanish radio and TV host

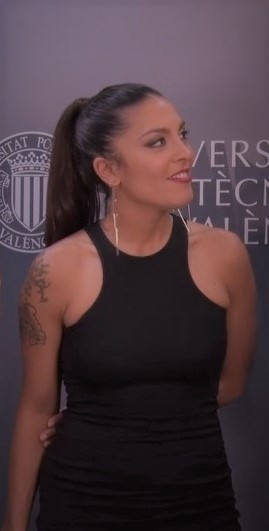
- Born: Lorena Castell Barragán; 4 February 1981 (age 44); Barcelona, Spain
- Occupations: Television presenter and singer
- Years active: 2002–present

Lorena Castell Barragán (born 4 February 1981, Barcelona) is a Spanish radio and television presenter.

== Filmography ==
=== Films ===
Films
Year	Title	Character	Notes
2008	Reality	Loli	Short film
2009	Spanish Movie	Juani	Minor play
2013	Secretos	Herself	Short film

=== TV series ===
TV series
Year	Title	Channel	Character	Notes
2002–2005	No n'hi ha prou	TV3	Herself	9 episodes
2018	Capítulo 0	#0	Secretaria	1 episode

=== Web series ===
Web series
Year	Title	Character	Notes
2013	Fantasmagórica	Fantasma	10 episodes

=== TV programmes ===
TV programmes
Year	Title	Channel	Notes
2008	¿Por qué no te callas?	Telecinco	Panelist
2008	La Via Làctia	8tv	Co-Host
2009–2011	Gran Hermano: El Debate	Telecinco	Panelist
2010	El marco	Antena 3	Co-Host
2010	Lo que diga la rubia	Cuatro	Panelist
2010–2011	Gran Hermano 12: Resumen	Telecinco	Host
2011	No le digas a mamá que trabajo en la tele	Cuatro	Host
2013	Tu cara más solidaria 2	Antena 3	Contestant as Dolly Parton
2013	Lorena y sus Hangouts	Sol Música	Host
2013	Splash! Famosos al agua	Antena 3	Contestant
2013	El hormiguero 3.0	Antena 3	Invitada con Daniela Blume y Darek
2014	Vivan los bares	La 1	Host
2015–presente	Zapeando	laSexta	Panelist
2015–2016	Espejo público	Antena 3	Panelist
2016	Tu cara me suena: Elige al primero	Antena 3	Contestant as Janet Jackson
2016–2017	Sol Música no para	Sol Música	Host
2017	Vergüenza Ajena (Made in Spain)	MTV España y Neox	Panelist
2017	1, 2, 3... hipnotízame	Antena 3	Panelist
2018	Viajeras con B	DKiss y #0	Host
2018	El Hormiguero	Antena 3	Guest with Frank Blanco y Quique Peinado
2018	Crush: la pasta te aplasta	La 1	Guest with Sara Escudero
2020	Top Photo	Neox	Host
2020	Pasapalabra	Antena 3	Guest contestant
2021–presente	Zapeando	laSexta	Substitute presenter
2022	El desafío	Antena 3	Contestant – 7th classified
2022	LOL: Si te ríes, pierdes	Amazon Prime Video	Contestant – 4th classified
2022	MasterChef Celebrity	La 1	Winner

=== Radio programmes ===
Radio
Year	Title	Broadcast	Notes
2012–2022	Yu: no te pierdas nada	Los 40 (2012–2019) / Europa FM (since 2019)	Co-Host and panelist
2018	Las Chicas	Cadena SER	Panelist
2018	Hoy por hoy	Cadena SER	Panelist
2020–2022	Vodafone YU	Europa FM	Host with Bnet
