= Ares Teixidó =

Spanish television presenter

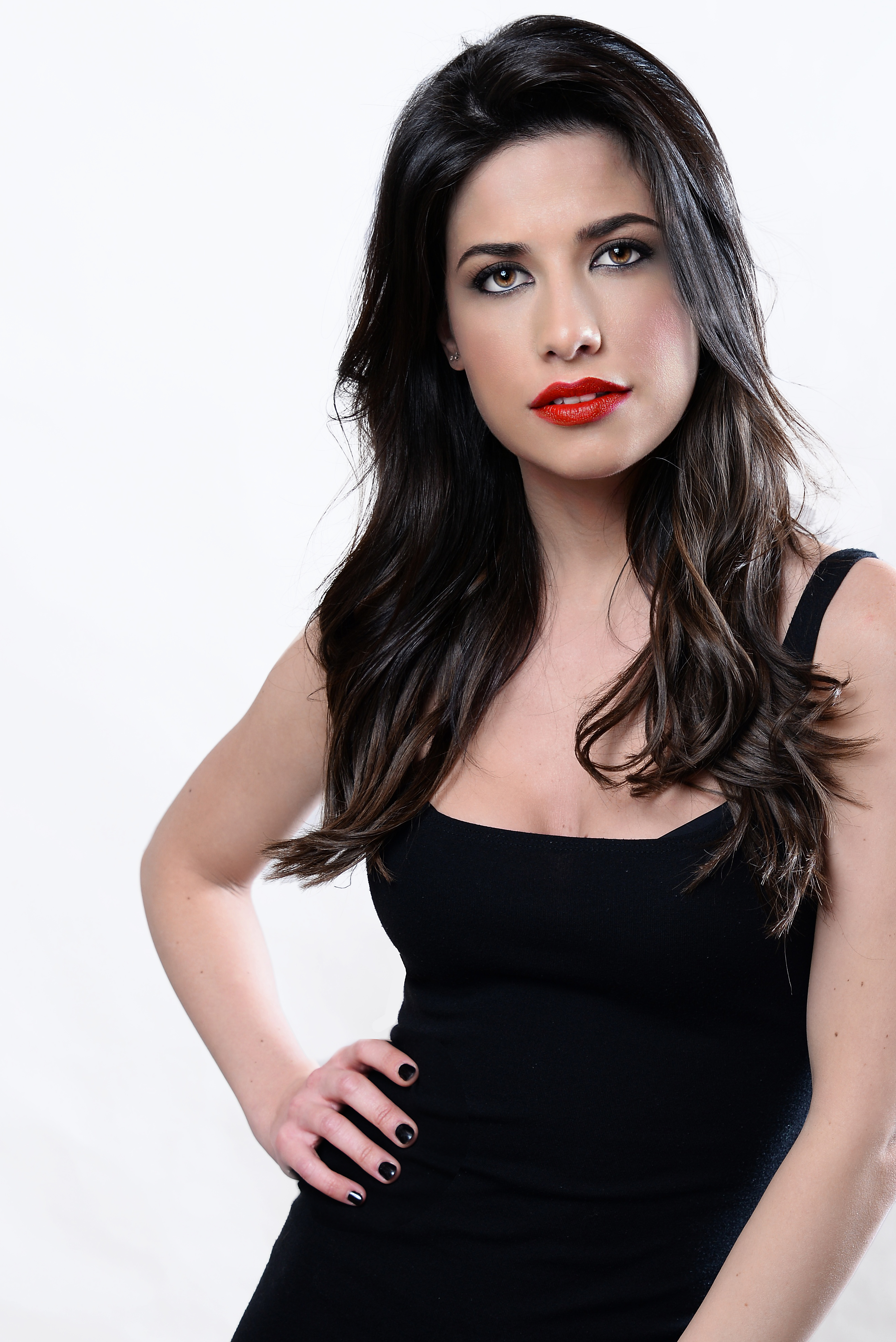
- Ares Teixidó in 2017
- Born: Ares Teixidó Domínguez; 19 January 1987 (age 38); Lleida, Spain
- Occupation: Spanish television presenter
- Years active: 2005 – present

Ares Teixidó Domínguez (Lleida; January 19, 1987) is a Spanish television reporter, broadcaster, presenter and commentator.

== Biography ==
=== Early years ===
Ares Teixidó was born in Lleida on January 19, 1987. She began working as a photographic model for magazines and catalogs while studying acting in Lleida. Her professional career began in 2001, presenting the children's radio program El núvol on COM Ràdio.

In addition, during 2005 and 2006, she collaborated in various programs on the local television station La Mañana TV. In March 2007, she joined the program Condició Femenina on Català TV, where she worked as a commentator until June 2008. At the same time, she joins the Xtop team of 8tv en la temporada estival de 2007 y durante el verano de 2008 se hace cargo del programa Voyeurs de Canal Català TV and the program + Q Pókeron the same channel, where she is also the casting director.

During the summer of 2009, she became a contributor to the radio program Quédate conmigo on Onda Cero. Later, she presents the radio program No son hores on Onda Cero Cataluña.

=== Career at Mediaset ===
In September 2009, she moved to national television as a reporter for the nightly program Mientras duermes on Telecinco. Subsequently, from October 2010 to January 2012, she was a reporter for the space Vuélveme loca on Telecinco. In July 2011, she made her debut on Cuatro as a regular contributor to the program No le digas a mamá que trabajo en la tele.

In the summer of 2014, she made her national television debut as a presenter on Telecinco's Cazamariposas XXL. In October 2014, she joined the team of Gran Hermano: El Debate on Telecinco, presented by Jordi González, where she was a commentator.

Between April and May 2015, she commented on Supervivientes: El Debate, a space presented by Raquel Sánchez Silva. In August 2015, she made her debut as a contributor to the program Trencadís on 8tv, presented by Sandra Barneda. She returns as a commentator in the programs Gran Hermano 16: El Debate and GH 16: Límite 48 horas.

In 2019, the presenter returned to Mediaset España as a commentator in the debate of Gran Hermano Dúo.

=== Career at Atresmedia ===
From February to June 2010, she was a reporter and contributor for the program Ya te digo on Neox. In the summer of 2010, she became a reporter for the program SummerTime on LaSexta.

Antena 3 announced her signing in September 2016 to host the program El Amor está en el aire with Juan y Medio. In addition, at the end of the same year, it was announced that she would be the presenter of the New Year's Eve special of Antena 3 called La vuelta al año en un zapping with Jorge Fernández. In February 2017, it was announced that she would be incorporated as a contributor to the program of La Sexta Zapeando.

=== Career in regional television stations ===
From January 2017 until May of that same year, she presented the contest Tot o res on TV3. In September of the same year, she appears on the same channel in the program Tarda Oberta, hosted by Ruth Jiménez.

At the same time, in August 2017, she announced her signing with Telemadrid to present the contest Hazlo por mil. The program remains on the air until December 2018.

In March 2018, she began to collaborate on the sports program Los infiltrados, presented by Vador Lladó and broadcast on Gol. She remained on the program until the end of 2019. In 2020, coinciding with the pandemic ofl COVID-19, she presents the program Influmierders on Teve.cat. In August 2021, she began presenting the program La revolución sexual on 8tv.

=== Other work ===
In 2012, she presented the program am, am on Canal Cocina with Dario Barrio.

Her acting career began when she starred in a short film in 2012 called Primer Aniversario. In 2013, she participated as an actress in the video clip of Pedro Giménez called Camino a San Antonio and in 2014 she made a cameo for the series of Antena 3 Bienvenidos al Lolita. In 2018, she acted in the video clip of Melendi Besos a la Lona.

In April 2017, she participated in the play Dreams, along with Alex Casademunt. Later that same year, she participated in the play Ring Ring with Sergi Cervera, where she played Mariana. In 2020, she starred again in the play Dreams junto with Alex Casademunt, this time renamed to Agencia Dreams. In 2021, she appeared in Begoña Mencía's micro–theater play Ya no te quiero.

== Trajectory ==
=== Television programs ===
| Year | Title | Channel | Role |
|---|---|---|---|
| 2007 | Xtop | 8tv | Reporter |
| 2007 – 2008 | Condició Femenina | Canal Català TV | Contributor |
| 2008 | Voyeurs | Canal Català TV | Host |
| 2009 – 2010 | Mientras duermes | Telecinco | Reporter |
| 2010 | Ya te digo | Neox | Reporter |
| 2010 | Summertime | La Sexta | Reporter |
| 2010 – 2011 | Vuélveme loca | Telecinco | Reporter |
| 2011 | No le digas a mamá que trabajo en la tele | Cuatro | Collaborator |
| 2012 | Ñam Ñam | Canal Cocina | Host |
| 2014 | Cazamariposas | Telecinco | Host |
| 2014 – 2016 | Gran Hermano: El Debate | Telecinco | Collaborator |
| 2015 | Gran Hermano VIP | Telecinco | Contestant |
| 2015 | Supervivientes: El Debate | Telecinco | Commentator |
| 2015 – 2016 | Trencadís | 8tv | Commentator |
| 2016 – 2019 | Gran Hermano VIP: El Debate | Telecinco | Commentator |
| 2016 | El amor está en el aire | Antena 3 | Host |
| 2016 | La vuelta al año en un zapping | Antena 3 | Host |
| 2017 | Tot o res | TV3 | Host |
| 2017 | Tu cara me suena 6 | Antena 3 | Guest performance |
| 2017 | Ahora caigo | Antena 3 | Guest |
| 2017 | Espejo público | Antena 3 | Guest |
| 2017 – 2018 | Zapeando | La Sexta | Commentator |
| 2017 – 2018 | Tarda Oberta | TV3 | Commentator |
| 2017 – 2018 | Hazlo por mil | Telemadrid | Host |
| 2018 – 2019 | Los infiltrados | GOL | Commentator |
| 2019 | GH Dúo: El Debate | Telecinco | Commentator |
| 2020 | Influmierders | Teve.cat | Host |
| 2021 – present | Sexual Revolution | 8tv | Host |

=== Radio programs ===
| Year | Title | Radio station | Role |
|---|---|---|---|
| 2001 | El núvol | COM Ràdio | Host |
| 2009 | Quédate conmigo | Onda Cero | Contributor |
| 2009 – 2010 | No son hores | Onda Cero Cataluña | Host |
| 2018 | Bac Up | Ràdio Flaixbac | Contributor |

=== Television series ===
| Year | Title | Channel | Character | Role |
|---|---|---|---|---|
| 2014 | Bienvenidos al Lolita | Antena 3 | Reporter | 1 episode |

=== Films ===
| Year | Title | Character | Directed by | Notes |
|---|---|---|---|---|
| 2012 | Primer aniversario | Lucía | Pablo Silva González | Short film |

=== Theater plays ===
| Year | Title | Character | Role |
|---|---|---|---|
| 2017; 2020 | Agencia Dreams | Sonia | Main role |
| 2017 | Ring Ring | Mariana | Main role |
| 2021 | Ya no te quiero | María | Main role |
