= Cero en Historia =

- Season 3
- Starring: Joaquín Reyes; Silvia Abril; Raúl Cimas; Sara Escudero; J.J. Vaquero

Release
- Original network: #0
- Original release: March 1, 2017 – December 28, 2021

Cero en Historia is a Spanish comedy panel show presented by Joaquín Reyes with Silvia Abril, Raúl Cimas, Sara Escudero and J.J. Vaquero as panelists.

In the first season, Javier Cansado, Elvira Lindo, Santi Millán and Juanma López Iturriaga made guest appearances. In the third season Javier Cansado, Nieves Concostrina, Alaska, Cayetana Guillén Cuervo, Fernando Colomo, Llum Barrera, Leticia Dolera, Montserrat Domínguez and Carles Sans made guest appearances.

In the season 3 episode 14 Silvia Abril was replaced by Anabel Alonso due to health problems.

The fourth season was aired on 12 September 2018. Dani Rovira, Ernesto Sevilla, Andreu Buenafuente, Susanna Griso, Roberto Leal, Toni Acosta and Javier Gurruchaga, between others, made guest appearances.

The fifth season aired on 27 February 2019. Aitana Sánchez-Gijón, Ana Morgade, Miren Ibarguren, Gemma Nierga, Blanca Portillo, Ángel Martín, Juan Manuel de Prada, Nieves Concostrina and Javier Coronas will make guest appearances. Patricia Conde replaced Silvia Abril.

In the seventh season Sara Escudero was replaced by Susi Caramelo. Javier Cansado, Nieves Concostrina, Dafne Fernández, Javier Botet, María Escoté, Javier Coronas and América Valenzuela will be the contestants. It will be added a new section called "Del dicho al trecho" in order to know the origins of proverbs.

In the tenth season Pablo Chiapella replaced Raul Cimas, and the contestants were Pepe Colubi, Ignatius Farray, María Barranco, Leo Harlem, Florentino Fernández, Martina Klein, Eva Soriano and Jorge Ponce, between others. It last aired on 28 December 2021.
