= Sara Escudero =

Spanish comedian, actress and TV presenter

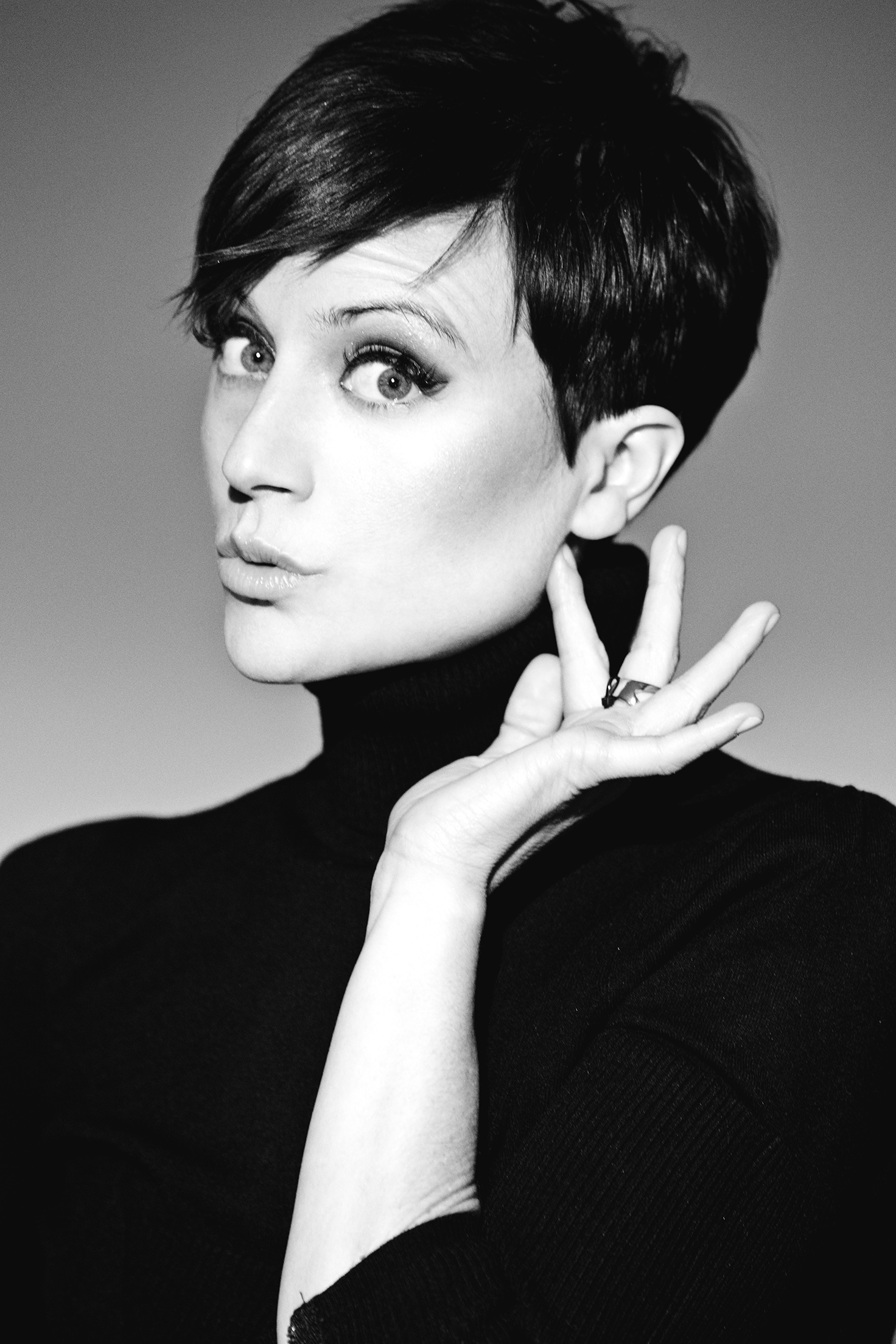
- Escudero in 2016
- Born: 18 August 1981 (age 44); Arenas de San Pedro, Spain
- Occupations: Actress; comedian; TV presenter
- Years active: 2007–present
- Website: www.soysaraescudero.com

Sara Escudero Rodríguez (born 18 August 1981) is a Spanish comedian, actress, TV presenter, and radio broadcaster.

== Early life ==
Sara Escudero was born in Talavera de la Reina and grew up in Arenas de San Pedro (Ávila).

== Career ==
Escudero is a professional comedian and actress since 2007 with many monologues and a multitude of sketches recorded on Comedy Central TV Channel and The Comedy Club which chose her as the winner of the V Monologue Contest. The prize was the participation in the 2012–2013 season, recording her monologue and sharing program with Berto Romero, Joaquín Reyes, Florentino Fernández and Ernesto Alterio.

Since 2007 Escudero has traveled the country with her one-person shows (humor monologues) for theaters and private events for many large companies in the country. In spring 2013 Escudero joined the La Noche de José Mota team (TVE1) recording ultra-fast pieces in most of the programs of the season.

In 2014 she joined the TV program Zapeando, in La Sexta TV Channel, presented by Frank Blanco, with collaborators Cristina Pedroche, Miki Nadal, Quique Peinado, Ana Morgade and Manu Sánchez. Also in 2014, she published her first book En Ocasiones Veo Frikis with Anaya Multimedia Publishing House. In 2015, she premiered in Madrid her first play as writer, director and producer, Te elegiría otra vez, at the Alfil Theater. The same year she began as a collaborator in the radio morning show Atrévete, by Cadena Dial, presented by Jaime Cantizano and teaming up with Patricia Imaz and Isidro Montalvo among others. From 2015 to 2017 she was the programs presenter at Atreseries (Atresmedia)

In 2016 Escudero was the presenter of Sigueme el rollo on TenTv during 22 shows. From the end of 2016 to the beginning of 2017 she was a contributor to the television program Hazte un selfie on Cuatro, presented by Uri Sàbat and Adriana Abenia. From 2017 to the present, she is a collaborator in the TV show Cero en Historia on #0 de Movistar+ together with, Joaquín Reyes, Silvia Abril, J.J. Vaquero, Raúl Cimas y Patricia Conde. For now 5 seasons have been broadcast. In 2017, she published her second book Clericó with Circulo Rojo publishing house, together with the illustrator Sito Recuero. For four months she performed in the Pequeño Teatro Gran Via in Madrid with her humor show (monologue) SARA ES ... CUDERO.

In March 2018 Escudero presented the 25th awards ceremony of the Cáceres Solidarity Film Festival (San Pancracio Awards) in which Pedro Almodóvar (adopted son of the city) was honored with the Festival's Honor Award and he publicly congratulated Escudero from the stage for her good work presenting the gala. In 2018 Sara published her third book No estás a la altura with the publisher Fun Readers. The singer Junior Ferbelles composes the song "No estamos a la altura ni lo queremos" for the book and its presentation. During 2018 she presented season 1 and 2 of "Arranca en verde" on La 1, broadcasting on Sundays. In 2018 she also presents Dfiesta, a contest about road safety on La 2 de RTVE, during 11 weekly programs throughout the Spanish geography. In 2018 Escudero participated as an actress on the TV series Centro Médico on TVE1, on the episode "White powder" as the character of Ana Puig.

In early 2019 Escudero debuted in the world of cinema as a director with the short film Dorothy, Ninette y un billete de 50, which also produces. The short film is starred by Antonia San Juan and Belinda Washington, and features the appearances of Ramón Langa and Alex O'Dogherty. The short film premiered in July at the 42nd edition of the Elche International Independent Film Festival in the official section, opting for an award in Novel Author category. Shortly after, in the same year, she produced and directed the short film Por error, where she also acts with a secondary character (councilor). The short film stars actor Juan Logar and is based on a true story. On 13 July 2019, the 13th program of "Juego de niños" is broadcast in La 1, presented by Javier Sardà, in which Escudero and Alfred García compete with the usual dynamics of the program, based on descriptions and analysis of the world told by children.

== Filmography ==
=== Film ===
Films
Year	Title	Job	Character	Director	Notas
2019	Dorothy, Ninette y un billete de 50	Director	–	Sara Escudero	Shortfilm. Main characters: Antonia San Juan and Belinda Washington
2019	Por error	Director, actress	Councilor	Sara Escudero	Shortfilm. Secondary actress.

=== TV shows ===
TV shows
Year	Title	TV Channel	Notes
2011–2017	El club de la comedia	La Sexta	Comedian
2013	La noche de José Mota	Telecinco	Collaborator
2014–2016	Zapeando	La Sexta	Collaborator
2015–2016	Más de series	Atreseries	Presenter
2015–2016	Qué fue de...	Atreseries	Presenter
2016	Sígueme el rollo	Ten TV	Presenter
2016–2017	Hazte un selfi	Cuatro	Collaborator
2017 – presente	Cero en Historia	#0	Collaborator
2018	Arranca en verde	La 1	Presenter
2018	Aquí la Tierra	La 1	Guest
2018	Dfiesta	La 2	Presenter
2019	Juego de niños	La 1	Guest

=== TV Series ===
Year	Serie	TV Channel	Character	Notes
2018	Centro Médico	La 1	Ana Puig	1 Episode

=== Web series ===
Web series
Year	Title	Character	Notes
2016	Irse de madre	Sara Escudero	18 episodes

== Radio shows ==
Programas de radio
Year	Títle	Station	Notes
2015–2017	Atrévete	Cadena Dial	Collaborator

== Theater plays ==
- 2015: Te elegiría otra vez.
- 2018: SARA ES...CUDERO (Monologue).

== Books ==
- 2014: "En ocasiones veo frikis".
- 2017: "Clericó".
- 2018: "No estás a la altura".
