= Juanma Castaño =

Spanish journalist

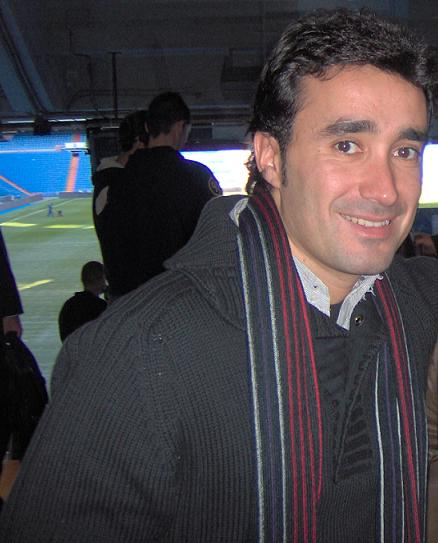
- Born: Juan Manuel Castaño Menéndez; 10 May 1977 (age 48); Gijón, Asturias, Spain
- Occupations: Journalist and television presenter
- Employers: Cadena SER; (1993-2011); Mediaset España; (2005-2018); Movistar+; (2009-2011/2018-present); COPE; (2011-present); Antena 3; (2022-present)

Juan Manuel Castaño Menéndez (Gijón, Spain, May 10, 1977), better known as Juanma Castaño, is a Spanish sports presenter and commentator.

== Biography ==
Juanma was born in Gijón on May 10, 1977, studied at the Colegio de la Inmaculada (Gijón), class of 1995, and enrolled in Law at the University of Oviedo, although he did not finish his university studies.

== Professional career ==
In 1993 he began participating in a program on SER Gijón called Jóvenes y campeones, from where he moved on to Carrusel deportivo and Gijón SER Deportivos, commenting on Real Sporting matches. In 2001 he made the leap to the Cadena SER sports editorial office in Madrid, becoming one of the most well-known collaborators of the network and also participating in television programs such as the now defunct Maracaná 06 by Paco González on Cuatro.

He has worked in several concentrations of the Spanish National Team and covered Euro 2008.

He broadcast five Vueltas Ciclistas a España, four Tour de France and two Giro d'Italia. It also covered the 2006 World Road Cycling Championship.

He is the author of the book Podemos together with Manu Carreño and Rubén Parra.

Together with Santiago Cañizares, he directed and presented the program El día después on Canal+.

On August 23, 2011, he officially joined the sports team of Cadena COPE, joining the programs Tiempo de juego and El partido de las 12, thus leaving his career at Canal+.

Since August 21, 2016, he has been directing El Partidazo de COPE, COPE's nightly program from Sunday to Thursday, from 11:30 pm to 1:30 am.

In July 2018, his employment relationship with Mediaset España, ended, putting an end to thirteen years with the company, shortly after which his signing with Movistar+ was announced.

From September 16, 2019, he leads El Partidazo on Movistar+.

In 2021 he participated in the sixth edition of MasterChef Celebrity, where he was proclaimed winner along with Miki Nadal.

Since 2022, he has appeared as a talk show host on Antena 3's El Hormiguero.

On March 27, 2022, he will premiere on Movistar Plus+, together with Miki Nadal, a cooking show called "Cinco Tenedores" (Five Forks).
