= Zapeando =

Spanish television program

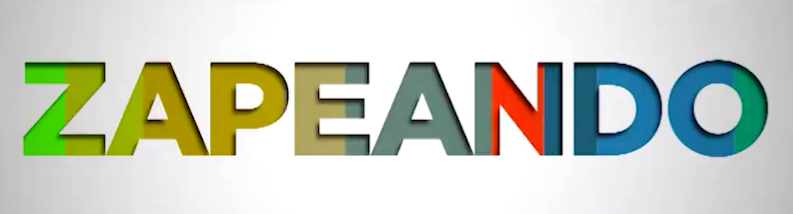
- Genre: Humour; Zapping
- Created by: Juan Andrés García Ropero "Bropi"
- Directed by: Carlos Herrero
- Presented by: Frank Blanco (2013-2019); Dani Mateo (2019-present)
- Starring: Ana Morgade; Anna Simon; Miki Nadal; Quique Peinado; Cristina Pedroche; Llum Barrera; Leo Harlem; Lorena Castell; Valeria Ross; Maya Pixelskaya
- Country of origin: Spain
- Original language: Spanish
- No. of seasons: 4
- No. of episodes: More than 1050 (list of episodes)

Production
- Executive producer: Juan Andrés García Ropero "Bropi"
- Running time: 100 minutes (with commercials); 85 minutes (without commercials)
- Production company: Globomedia

Original release
- Network: laSexta
- Release: November 18, 2013 – present

Related
- Sé lo que hicisteis...; El Intermedio; 90 minuti

Zapeando (possible English translation: Doing zapping, and self-called Zappeanding) is a Spanish television program produced by Globomedia which has been on air at the afternoons of laSexta since November 18, 2013. Created by Juan Andrés García "Bropi" and hosted by Frank Blanco (Dani Mateo since 2019), the program makes a humoristic review of other television programmes, plays games, prepares some sections...

The collaborators of the program are Ana Morgade, Anna Simon, Cristina Pedroche, Miki Nadal and Quique Peinado plus other occasional collaborators.

== Format ==
Zapeando is a live chat where its host and its collaborators talk about the most highlighted moments of the television, as well as the spaces more and less loved by viewers, the best videos and video edits, the mistakes of other hosts, remembering old people who had success on television or the most talked-about commercials. In addition, the format supports introducing guests to some programmes that help to chat about some TV moments (called momentazos, big moments) or simply talk about their most recent works.

== History ==
In late August 2013, it was announced that laSexta and Globomedia were preparing Zapeando, a live chat about television where a host and a group of collaborators would comment with humour all the actuality related to television, both nationally and internationally. On October 4 it was revealed that Frank Blanco would be his host, and a few days later his collaborators, which would be Celia Montalbán, César García, Mar Vega, Miki Nadal, Quique Peinado, Santi Villas, Sergi Mas and Susana Guasch.

Although its release was planned for November 11, Zapeando finally began to be broadcast on November 18, 2013 at 3.45 pm. Since then, it has been aired from Monday to Friday on the afternoons of laSexta. After some weeks of broadcast, the program began to incorporate innovations that gave a more fluent and better appearance to the program, such as the introduction of a script and adding a central table in which the presenter and the collaborators sit down. Some of them left the program (César García, Mar Vega, Santi Villas, Sergi Mas, Celia Montalbán and Susana Guasch) but new ones came, such as Sara Escudero, Ana Morgade, Cristina Pedroche and Manu Sánchez.

Little by little, more collaborators have joined the program, such as Anna Simon, Josie, Leo Harlem, Lorena Castell or Llum Barrera. Others left to dedicate themselves to other projects, such as Irene Junquera, Sara Escudero or Manu Sánchez. In addition, new collaborators are occasionally introduced during the summer to substitute the regular ones during this period.

The audience of the program has improved greatly since its beginning, with audience shares between 7% and 9% share and a number of viewers between 800 000 and one million on average. Its audience record was achieved in the program 500 (November 23, 2015), with an average of 1 200 000 viewers and an audience share of 9.4%. At the present, the network channel is satisfied with the positive audience evolution data, reaching more than 800 000 spectators and occasionally a million spectators.

Since September, 2019 the program is hosted by Dani Mateo.

== Program team ==
=== Host ===
Host	Profession	Duration
Frank Blanco	TV and radio host	First program - present

Substitute hosts	Duration
Ana Morgade	Program 426
Miki Nadal	Program 427
Quique Peinado	Program 428
Sara Escudero	Program 429
Irene Junquera	Program 430
Anna Simon	Program 588; Programmes 669-678

=== Current collaborators ===
Here there is a list of the current collaborators, sorted by first appearance date.

Collaborator	Profession	Duration	Notes
Miki Nadal	Host, actor, humorist and comedian	First program – present	
Quique Peinado	Journalist, writer and collaborator	Second program – present	
Ana Morgade	Actress, host and humorist	November 2013 – present	
Cristina Pedroche	Host and actress	December 2013 – present	
Anna Simon	Host and journalist	July 2014 – present	
Leo Harlem	Humorist and monologuist	May 2014 – April 2016; June 13, 2016; September 2016 – present	
Lorena Castell	Host, actress and singer	August 2015; May 20 and 27, 2016; July 2016 – present	
Chenoa	Singer and composer	February 2017 – present	Only on Mondays
Josie	Stylist and fashion journalist	April 2014 – present	"Josie News" and "Josie's consultancy" weekly sections
Mario Vaquerizo	Collaborator	March 2017 – present	"5 videos with Mario" weekly section
Ares Teixidó	Actress and host	February 7, 2017; March 17, 2017; June 2017 – present	
Llum Barrera	Actress, comedian and humorist	November 2015 – present	
Juan Carlos Librado, Nene	Monologuist and actor	June 2017 – Actualment	

Regular collaborators
Occasional collaborators
Punctual collaborators (less frequent)
Section-only collaborators

== Seasons and programmes ==
Season	Programmes	Start	End	Average audience	
Season	Programmes	Start	End	Viewers	Share
Season 1 (2013-2014)	162	November 18, 2013	July 18, 2014	689 000	5.4%
Summer season (2014)	29	July 21, 2014	August 29, 2014	806 000	7.1%
Season 2 (2014-2015)	209	September 1, 2014	July 3, 2015	894 000	7.2%
Summer season (2015)	45	July 6, 2015	September 4, 2015	785 000	6.6%
Season 3 (2015-2016)	208	September 7, 2015	July 1, 2016	895 000	7.3%
Summer season (2016)	45	July 4, 2016	September 2, 2016	731 000	6.4%
Season 4 (2016-2017)	208	September 5, 2016	June 30, 2017	824 000	6.9%
Summer season (2017)	About 45 *	July 3, 2017	September 2017 *		

(*) Provisional data
(Bold) Most viewed season

== Awards ==
Zapeando and its team won the Gold Antenna award in 2015 and the Silver Antenna in 2017. They have also been nominated several times for the Neox Fan Awards and the Iris Awards.

Year	Award	Category	Candidate	Result
2014	Neox Fan Awards	The big program	Zapeando	Nominated
2014	Neox Fan Awards	The mega-host	Frank Blanco	Nominated
2014	Neox Fan Awards	The greatest	Josie	Eliminated
2015	Neox Fan Awards	The big program	Zapeando	Nominated
2015	Neox Fan Awards	LOL face	Frank Blanco	Nominated
2015	Neox Fan Awards	OMG moment	Boris Izaguirre kissing Frank Blanco	Eliminated
2015	Neox Fan Awards	OMG moment	Cristina Pedroche's transparent dress she wore at the Twelve Grapes program with Frank Blanco	Nominated
2015	Gold Antenna Awards	Television	Frank Blanco	Winner
2016	Iris Awards from Spanish TV Academy	Best direction	Carlos Herrero, director of the program	Nominated
2016	Iris Awards from Spanish TV Academy	Best production	María Zarazúa, producer of the program	Nominated
2017	Silver Antenna Awards	Television	Anna Simon	Winner
