= Rober Bodegas =

Spanish comedian

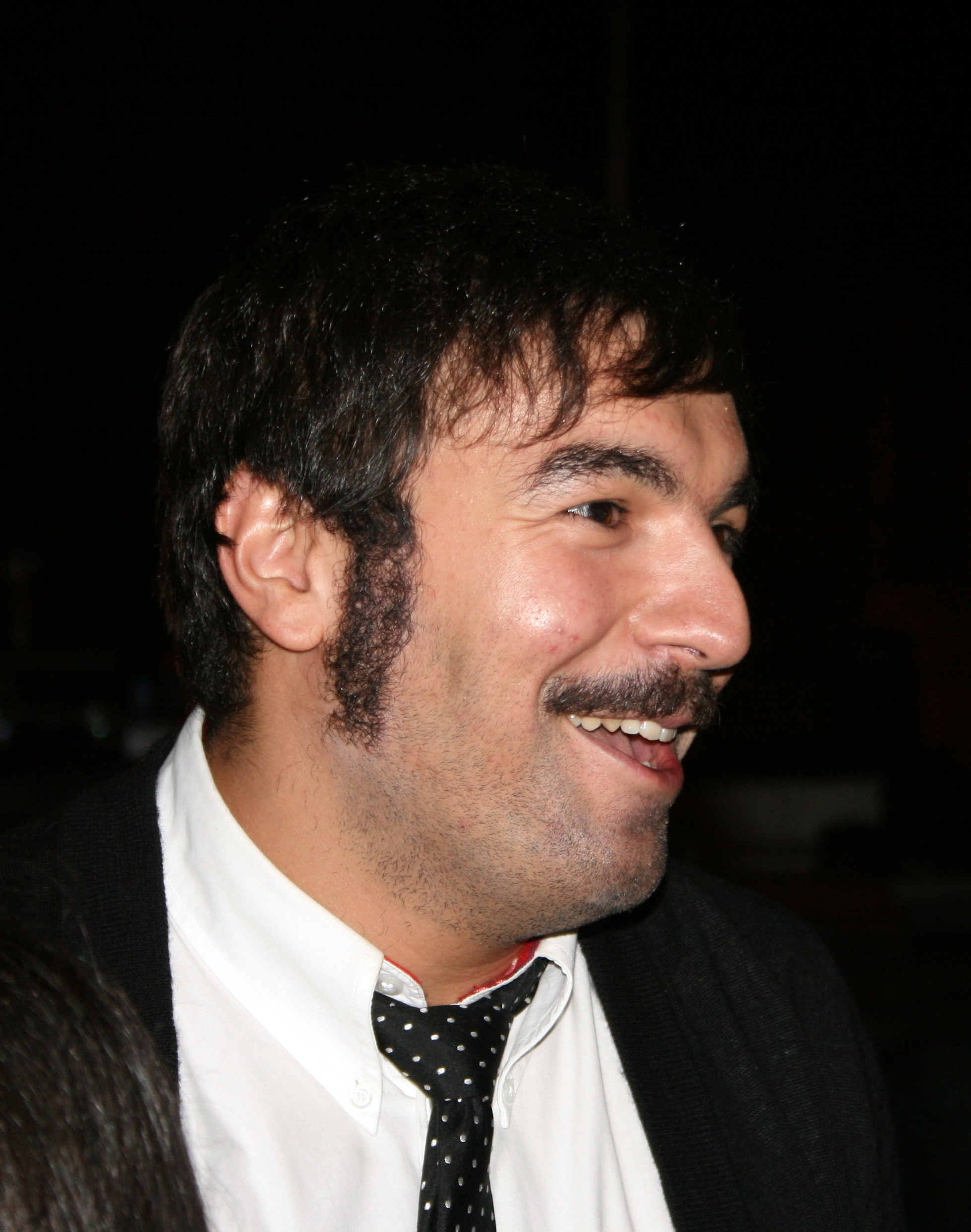
- Bodegas in 2009
- Born: Roberto Fernández Cancela; 23 June 1982 (age 44); Carballo, Galicia, Spain
- Education: University of A Coruña
- Years active: 2005–present

Roberto Fernández Cancela (born 23 June 1982), known as Rober Bodegas, is a Spanish comedian. He gained popularity with his participation in the television program of La 1, El rey de la comedia, and was a scriptwriter and contributor to the magazine Sé lo que hicisteis... in laSexta until March 2011.

== Biography ==
He studied architecture at the University of A Coruña, and after the first cycle he continued his training as an interior designer. At the beginning of the 2000s he performed humorous monologues. In 2005 he made a stand-up show titled Un día horrible and co-wrote the play Gazapos.

In 2007 he won the comedy contest El rey de la comedia. After this he made his stand-up show, Vamos a dejarnos de hostias and in 2008 El día en el que empecé a odiar los yogures y otras desgracias. From 2008 to 2011 he was writer and collaborator of the comedy television program Sé lo que hicisteis....

He is part of the comedy duo Pantomima Full, alongside Alberto Casado. They started with sketches in YouTube and since March 2018 they also appear in the TV program La resistencia in channel #0.

In August 2018 he had to withdraw from his channel a monologue about the gypsy community, for which he received many criticisms and even threats.
