= Berta Collado =

Spanish TV presenter and journalist

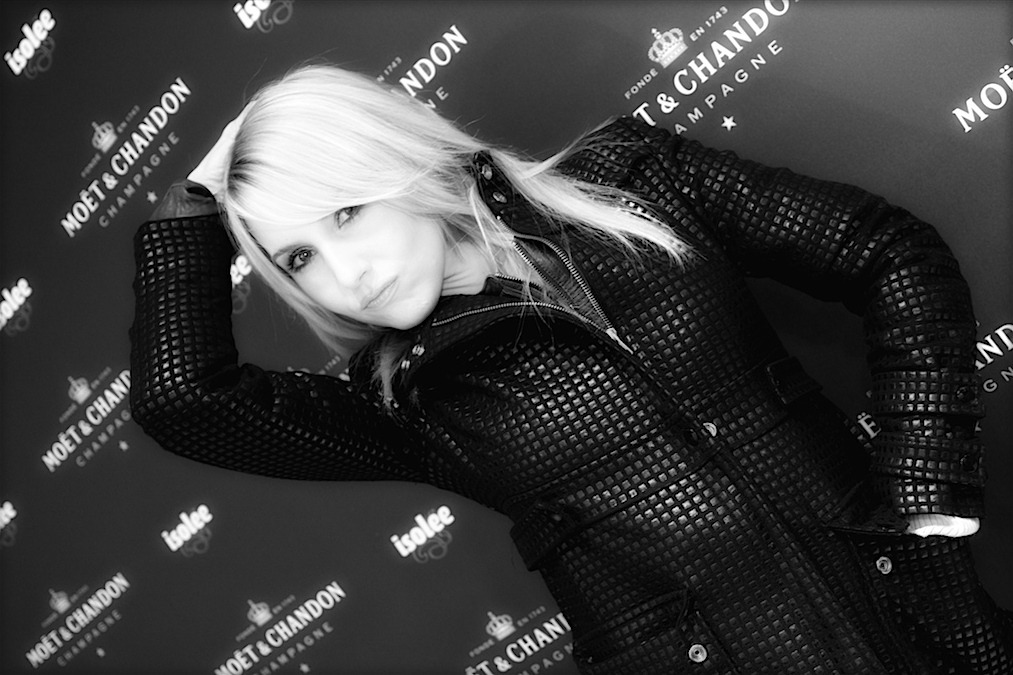
- Born: Berta Collado Rivera; 3 July 1979 (age 47); Talavera de la Reina, Toledo, Spain
- Years active: 2005–present

Berta Collado Rivera (Talavera de la Reina, Toledo, Spain, 3 July 1979) is a Spanish TV presenter and journalist. She grew up in Navalmoral de la Mata, Cáceres, Spain.

== Career ==
She started in journalism when she was 20 in various print and communication offices. She began in television in 2004 in the local network Punto TV belonging to Vocento Group.

In Onda 6 she hosted the second season of the videogame-related program Do U Play? and later Insert Coin in AXN.

In 2006 she co-hosted in the sports program Maracaná 06 on Cuatro.

In addition she has worked as a model advertising for several brands such as Deuralde or a video advertising the Spanish Armed Forces.

In November 2005 she joined in the comedy program Sé lo que hicisteis... in La Sexta as a reporter of political and sports events. From July 5, 2010, Berta become the host substitute of the program during Patricia Conde vacations.

She also has appeared in February 2009 the cover of men's magazine FHM and was selected the 22nd sexiest Spanish women by that magazine.

Since March 2015 she appears in the talk show/debate program Amigas y conocidas in La 1 and since March 2016 she appears in the radio program Las mañanas Kiss in Kiss FM.

== Television ==
- Do U Play (Onda 6).
- Insert Coin (2006-2008) (AXN and Sony TV)
- Maracaná 06 (2006-2007) (Cuatro).
- Al salir de clase (Telecinco).
- U.V.E (Cuatro).
- Como te lo cuento.... (Localia TV).
- El ojo público (La 1).
- Esta tarde con esta gente (Cuatro).
- Sé lo que hicisteis... (2007-2011) (La Sexta).
- Se hace saber (2013-2014) (La 1)
- Todo va bien (2014-2015) (Cuatro).
- La alfombra roja palace (2015) (La 1)
- La mañana de La 1 (2015) (La 1)
- Amigas y conocidas (2015–present) (La 1)
