= Morgade (surname) =

Morgade is a surname. Notable people with the surname include:

- Ana Morgade (born 1979), Spanish presenter, comedian and actress
- José Manuel Rodríguez Morgade (born 1984), Spanish footballer
