= Al rojo vivo =

Al Rojo Vivo is a Spanish-language expression meaning red hot. It may refer to:

== Cinema ==
Spanish versions of the films:

- White Heat (1949), directed in USA by Raoul Walsh
- Mercury Rising (1998), American film directed by Harold Becker
- Al rojo vivo (1969 film), 1969 Mexican film by director Gilberto Gazcón

== Television ==
- Al rojo vivo (1980 TV series), a Mexican telenovela produced by Ernesto Alonso for Televisa in 1980
- Al Rojo Vivo (2002 TV program), a 2002 Spanish-language news program that airs on the American television network Telemundo
- Al Rojo Vivo (2011 TV program), a 2011 daytime news and current affairs talk show aired on La Sexta in Spain

== Other uses ==
- Al Rojo Vivo (album), a 1983 album by Ednita Nazario
