= Cuerpo de élite =

Spanish television series

- Genre: Comedy; Political satire
- Based on: Cuerpo de élite by Adolfo Valor & Cristóbal Garrido
- Written by: Adolfo Valor; Cristóbal Garrido
- Directed by: Joaquín Mazón; Mar Olid
- Starring: Octavi Pujades; Cristina Castaño; Canco Rodríguez; Adriana Torrebejano; Álvaro Fontalba; Ana Morgade; Antonio Garrido; Joaquín Reyes; María Botto; El Langui; Ismael Martínez
- Country of origin: Spain
- Original language: Spanish
- No. of seasons: 1
- No. of episodes: 13

Production
- Production companies: Atresmedia Televisión; MOD Producciones

Original release
- Network: Antena 3
- Release: 6 February – 8 May 2018

Cuerpo de élite is a Spanish comedy television series that originally aired on Antena 3 from 6 February 2018 to 8 May 2018. Consisting of an adaptation of the 2016 film of the same name, it was written by Adolfo Valor and Cristóbal Garrido and directed by Joaquín Mazón. It stars Octavi Pujades, Cristina Castaño, Canco Rodríguez, Adriana Torrebejano, Álvaro Fontalba, among others.

== Premise ==
Trying to move away from the heavy focus on regional stereotypes so embedded in the namesake film, even if the characters display different regional backgrounds, the comedy follows a heterogeneous elite group of law enforcement officers at the service of the Spanish Ministry of the Interior coming from different units: a TEDAX, a Ertzaintza, a green beret, a mossa d'esquadra and a CNP agent.

== Cast ==
- Octavi Pujades, as Ximo.
- Cristina Castaño as Elena.
- Canco Rodríguez as Salvador "Salva" Baeza.
- Adriana Torrebejano as Berta.
- Álvaro Fontalba as Josemari.
- Ana Morgade as Montse Gil.
- Antonio Garrido as Efe.
- Joaquín Reyes as Julián.
- María Botto as Andrea Zimmerman.
- El Langui as Ramón Carreño.
- Ismael Martínez as Iñaki.

== Production and release ==
Cuerpo de Élite consists of an adaptation to a television format of the eponymous 2016 film written by Adolfo Valor and Cristóbal Garrido and directed by Joaquín Mazón. Produced by Atresmedia Televisión in collaboration with MOD Producciones, both Mazón, Valor and Garrido returned in the same capacity (director and writers). Mar Olid joined Mazón at direction duties.

The series premiered on Antena 3 on 6 February 2018. The broadcast of the first episode earned a "magnificent" 24.6% share as well as 4,193,000 viewers. The broadcasting run wrapped on 8 May 2018 with a "good" 16.4% average audience share, even though the season finale only scored a 12.3% share (1,832,000 viewers). The series was cancelled by Antena 3 after one season.
