= Cristina Pardo =

Spanish journalist and television presenter

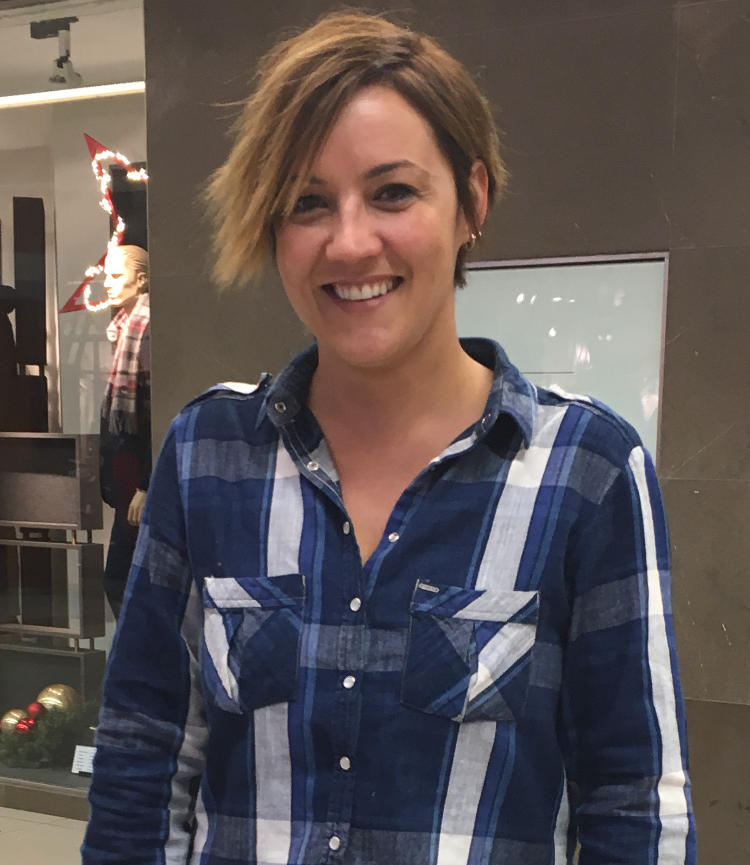
- Born: July 5, 1977 (age 49); Pamplona, Navarre, Spain
- Education: University of Navarra
- Occupations: Journalist and TV presenter
- Years active: 2006–present
- Website: vivirppeligrosamente.com

Cristina Pardo Virto (Pamplona, Navarre, July 5, 1977) is a Spanish journalist and television presenter.

== Education ==
Pardo studied journalism in the University of Navarra in Spain.

== Career ==
Pardo started working with Antonio Herrero in the radio program La Mañana in Cadena COPE.

In 2006, she started to work in the news program La Sexta Noticias in the political section, covering the information about the People's Party. During the Holy Week of 2013 she was the replacement of Antonio García Ferreras in the political debate program Al rojo vivo in La Sexta.

Since June 2014, she appears in the radio program A vivir que son dos días in Cadena SER, with a political section.

In April and November 2017, she was the host of the documentary series about political corruption Malas compañías: Historias anónimas de la corrupción in La Sexta.

Since April 2018 she is the host of the interviews and current news program Liarla Pardo in La Sexta.
