= Nieves Concostrina =

Spanish writer and journalist

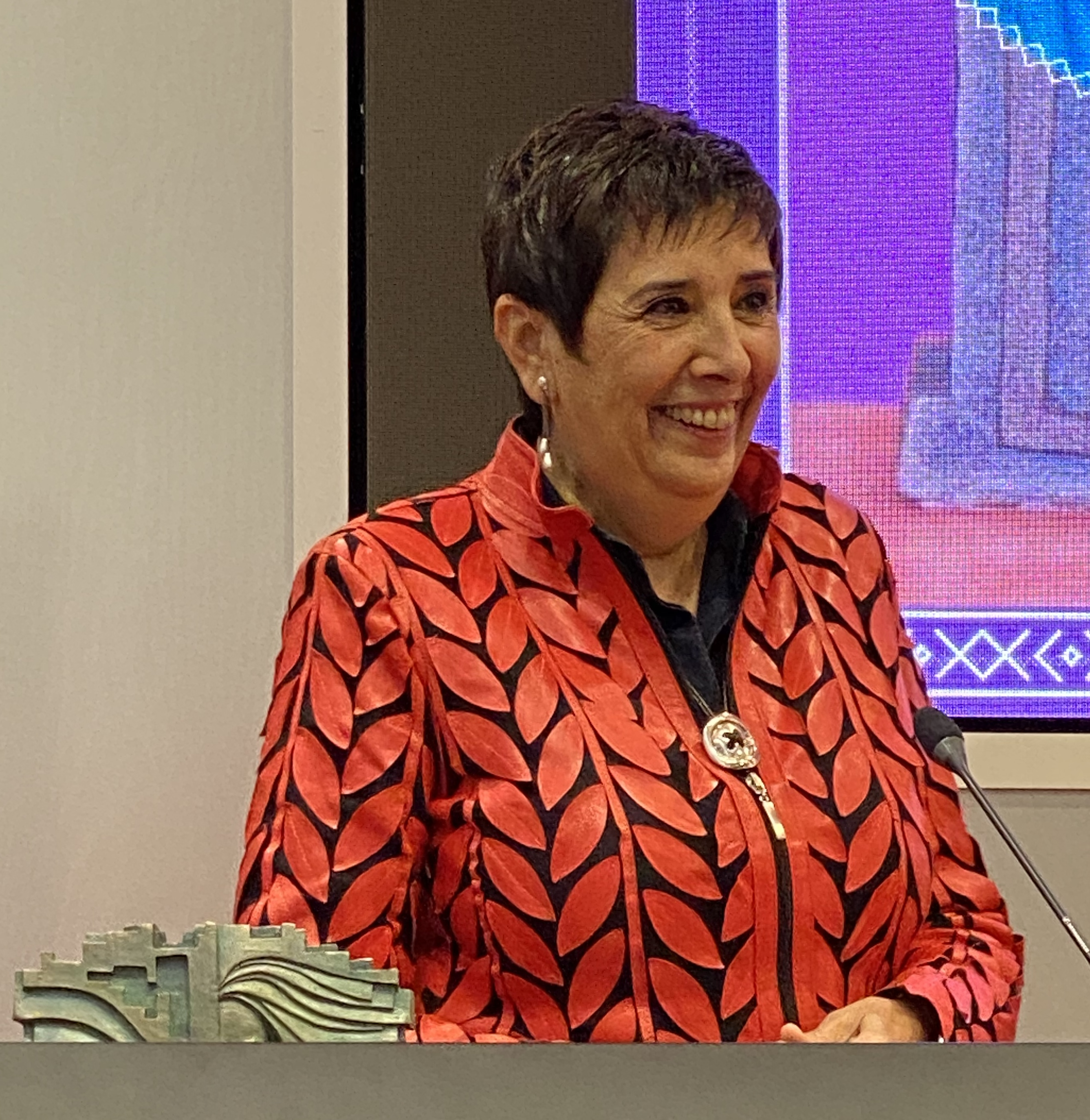
- Born: 1 August 1961 (age 63); Madrid
- Occupation(s): Writer and journalist
- Website: nievesconcostrina.es

Nieves Concostrina (born 1 August 1961) is a Spanish writer and journalist.

She is vice president of Fundación Inquietarte. She wrote the epilogue of the book Las mujeres de las cerezas. In 2016, she was awarded by Premio Ondas and, in 2005, the Andalucía de Periodismo award of the Regional Government of Andalusia. In 2010, she won the Micrófono de Oro award.

She was the advisor of the TV program Cero en Historia (2017). In 2018, she published Pretérito imperfecto, where she denied myths and legends about the history of Spain.

== Works ==
- Pretérito imperfecto (2018)
- Menudas Quijostorias (2016)
- Antonia (2014)
- Se armó la de San Quintín (2012)
- Pólvora eres II. Muertes ilustradas de la humanidad (2012)
- Menudas historias de la Historia (2009)
- Polvo eres (2009)
- ...Y en polvo te convertirás
- Acontece que no es poco (pódcast)
