= Michael Robinson (footballer) =

English-Irish footballer (1958–2020)

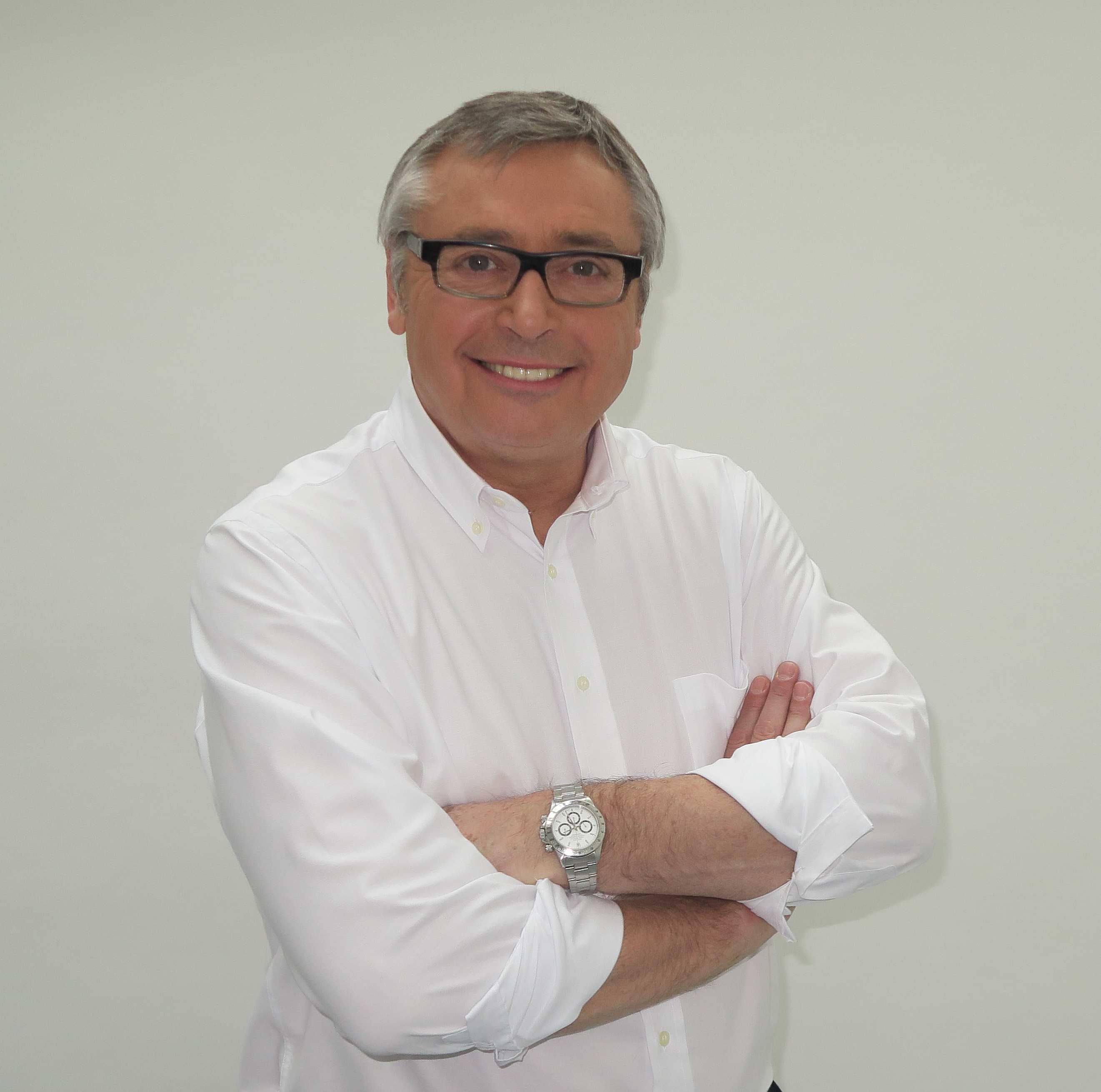
- Robinson in 2016

Personal information
- Full name: Michael John Robinson
- Date of birth: 12 July 1958
- Place of birth: Leicester, England
- Date of death: 28 April 2020 (aged 61)
- Place of death: Madrid, Spain
- Height: 6 ft 0 in (1.82 m)
- Position: Striker

Youth career
- Coventry City

Senior career*
Years	Team	Apps	(Gls)
1975–1979	Preston North End	48	(15)
1979–1980	Manchester City	30	(8)
1980–1983	Brighton & Hove Albion	113	(37)
1983–1984	Liverpool	30	(6)
1984–1986	Queens Park Rangers	48	(5)
1987–1989	Osasuna	58	(12)
Total		327	(83)

International career
1980–1986	Republic of Ireland	24	(4)
- * Club domestic league appearances and goals

Michael John Robinson (12 July 1958 – 28 April 2020) was a professional footballer who played as a striker.

He appeared in more than 300 official matches in England for Preston North End, Manchester City, Brighton & Hove Albion, Liverpool and Queens Park Rangers and played the last three seasons of his career in Spain with Osasuna. He represented the Republic of Ireland at international level.

Robinson settled in Spain after retiring in 1989 and went on to work as a television pundit in the following decades, hosting El día después from 1991 to 2005.

== Playing career ==
Robinson was born in Leicester, England. When he was young, his parents moved to Blackpool to run a boarding house, and he started his career with Preston North End in the second division. He then moved in August 1979 to Malcolm Allison's Manchester City, the fee of £750,000 being widely regarded as extravagant for a young player with no First Division experience; he was sold at a loss later that season to Brighton & Hove Albion, and rebuilt his reputation as both a strong and skilful attacking player.

Robinson made an impact in the 1982–83 FA Cup final, feeding the ball to Gordon Smith for his infamous miss in the first game with Manchester United, performing outstandingly in a 2–2 draw but eventually losing in the second match at Wembley (4–0). It was enough, however, for clubs to bid for him and he was keen to leave due to Brighton's relegation.

Liverpool came in for Robinson and paid Brighton £250,000 for him and he duly battled with established Kenny Dalglish and Ian Rush for a place up front. In that first season his new team won three trophies – the league, the league cup (where he was a substitute in the final 0–0 draw against Everton, and did not feature in the replay) and the European Cup (being used as a replacement in the final against AS Roma)– and he played enough games to earn a title medal.

Despite showing some ability, Robinson was often on the substitutes' bench, and so moved on to Queens Park Rangers at the end of 1984. There, he was an unlucky loser at Wembley again, in the 1986 Football League Cup final 3–0 defeat by Oxford United; however, during the run to the decisive match, he earned himself a place in QPR fans' hearts when he scored a 40-yard goal against arch-rivals Chelsea in the quarter-final replay at Stamford Bridge.

Robinson moved to Spain to play for CA Osasuna in January 1987, with ex-Liverpool teammate Sammy Lee joining in August. He recalled that he assumed that Osasuna was the name of the club's location and proceeded to look for it in a map. Questioned about why would he choose such a destination, he remarked that "financially it was the worst offer [available]. But it was romantic". He retired in summer 1989 at the age of 31 after making 58 La Liga appearances and scoring 12 goals, two of which came in 1987–88 campaign as the Navarrese overachieved for a final fifth place.

Robinson, who won 24 caps for the Republic of Ireland, making his debut on 28 October 1980 in a 2–0 loss in France for the 1982 FIFA World Cup qualifiers, stayed in Spain after retiring, having settled very well in the country and learned the language to fluency, a trait that was later picked up on by Steve McManaman (with Real Madrid from 1999 to 2003), who regarded Robinson as his mentor.

Michael Robinson: International goals
No.	Date	Venue	Opponent	Score	Result	Competition
1	19 November 1980	Lansdowne Road, Dublin, Republic of Ireland	Cyprus	3–0	6–0	1982 World Cup qualification
2	9 September 1981	De Kuip, Rotterdam, Netherlands	Netherlands	1–1	2–2	1982 World Cup qualification
3	14 October 1981	Lansdowne Road, Dublin, Republic of Ireland	France	3–1	3–2	1982 World Cup qualification
4	21 September 1983	Laugardalsvöllur, Reykjavík, Iceland	Iceland	2–0	3–0	Euro 1984 qualifying

== Media career ==
After retiring, Robinson began his broadcasting career in Spain as a commentator for RTVE, covering the 1990 FIFA World Cup in Italy. He later worked as a commentator and presenter on Cadena SER's El Larguero and then on the subscription channel Canal+, where he hosted the cult television show El día después for 14 years (1991–2005). Following the show's demise he continued working with the network, as co-commentator on their live coverage of the Sunday night match as well as on the studio show El día del fútbol, and later by presenting a monthly sports magazine series called Informe Robinson.

Speaking to Simon Hughes, Robinson said "I came over on 7 January 1987. I didn't know if I was going to be here forever. But something strange happened. I enjoyed more or less everything about Spain and the way the Spanish interpreted life. I finished up realising that I had loads in common with the Spaniards. We laughed about the same things, cried about the same things."

In addition, Robinson also worked as a pundit for Setanta Sports, covering Republic of Ireland away internationals and also being the president of the Iberian Superleague, a rugby union league covering the Iberian Peninsula. As a broadcaster he also covered for Canal+ rugby events, including the World Cup and the Six Nations Championship.

Robinson also did voice-over work on television adverts as well as feature films, voicing the ugly sister in the dubbed Spanish versions of the Shrek films by DreamWorks Animation.

== Illness and death ==
On 17 December 2018, while taking part in La Ventana, a radio programme on Cadena SER, Robinson announced that he had a melanoma which had been found at an advanced stage and had metastasized. Doctors had told him it 'had no cure'. He died on 28 April 2020 of cancer at his home in Madrid at the age of 61, being survived by his wife Christine (née Sharrock) and children Liam, who worked in television production in Madrid, and Aimée, who worked in public relations in Australia.

Among the tributes was one from Rafael Nadal: "We woke up with the sad news of the death of one of our own. You were the one who always made us happy about sport. We are grateful to you."

== Honours and awards ==
=== Player ===
Brighton & Hove Albion

- FA Cup runner-up: 1982–83

Liverpool

- Football League First Division: 1983–84
- Football League Cup: 1983–84
- European Cup: 1983–84

Queens Park Rangers

- Football League Cup runner-up: 1985–86

=== Other awards ===
- Premios Ondas: 2009 – Informe Robinson (Best Current affairs programme)
- Adopted son of Cádiz (2019)

== Works ==
- Robinson, Michael (1996). Las cosas de Robin [Robin's things] (in Spanish). Madrid: Ediciones El País-Aguilar. p. 248. ISBN 84-03-59722-3.
- Robinson, Michael (2001). Lo que el ojo no ve [What the eye doesn't see] (in Spanish). Madrid: Ediciones Aguilar. p. 196. ISBN 84-03-09252-0.
- Robinson, Michael (2015). Acento Robinson: El lado humano del deporte [Robinson accent: The human side of sport] (in Spanish). Aguilar. ISBN 978-8403501126.
- Es lo que hay...: Mis treinta años en España [It is what it is...: My thirty years in Spain] (in Spanish). Aguilar. 2017. ISBN 978-8403517462.

== See also ==
- List of Republic of Ireland international footballers born outside the Republic of Ireland
