= Informe Robinson =

- Genre: Sports
- Created by: Michael Robinson
- Directed by: Román Escoda
- Presented by: Michael Robinson
- Country of origin: Spain
- Original language: Spanish
- No. of seasons: 13
- No. of episodes: 110

Production
- Executive producer: Ana Valverde
- Cinematography: Adolpho Cañadas
- Camera setup: Multiple-camera setup
- Running time: 60 minutes
- Production company: Movistar+

Original release
- Network: Canal+ (2007-2016) #0 (2016-present)
- Release: October 31, 2007

Informe Robinson (English: The Robinson Report) is a monthly Spanish sports magazine programme broadcast on #0 and formerly on Canal+. It is hosted by former Republic of Ireland international football player Michael Robinson.

== Awards ==
- Premios Onda 2009: Best current affairs programme
