= En tu cabeza =

- Directed by: Daniel Sánchez Arévalo; Borja Cobeaga; Kike Maíllo; Alberto Ruiz Rojo
- Written by: Daniel Sánchez Arévalo; Curro Novallas
- Produced by: Xen Subirats; Clara Valle
- Starring: Michelle Jenner; Hugo Silva
- Cinematography: Jordi Bransuela
- Edited by: Frank Gutiérrez; David Tomas
- Release date: 16 September 2016
- Running time: 67 minutes
- Country: Spain
- Language: Spanish

En tu cabeza is a 2016 Spanish sci fi film directed by Daniel Sánchez Arévalo, Borja Cobeaga, Kike Maíllo and Alberto Ruiz Rojo. The film is produced by the Spanish natural gas utilities company Gas Fenosa.

== Plot ==
The film is divided into four vignettes linked by the following plot: Year 2052. Andrea's job is to travel back in time and her mission is to go deep into our heads and make us see the importance of preserving the environment. The young woman tries to change the destiny of the planet, but also wants to change her own way. To do this, he tries to prevent his self from the past from making the mistakes he now regrets.

== Cast ==
- Michelle Jenner as Andrea
- Hugo Silva as Mateo
- Fernando Tejero as Vicente
- Rossy de Palma as Milagros
- Maxi Iglesias as Vecino
- Concha Cuetos as Suegra
- Adrián Lastra as Tomi
- Daniel Guzmán as Charli
- Luis Varela as Suegro
- Ana Morgade as Chef
- Miguel Poveda as Cantante
- Julio Alonso as Eduardo
- Xavier Capdet as Alberto
- Natalia de Molina as Jefa de sala
- Oscar Dorta as Camarero
- Berta Vázquez as Camarera
