= Antonio García Ferreras =

Spanish journalist, television presenter and professor

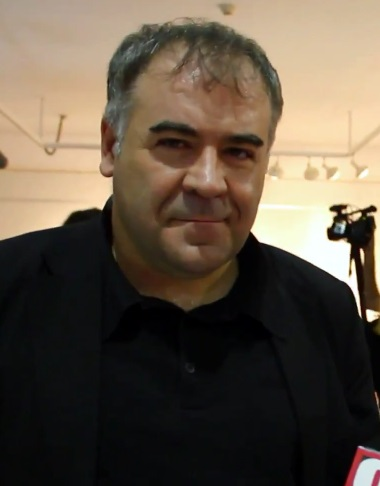
- (2013)
- Born: Antonio García Ferreras; 20 September 1966 (age 59); León, Spain
- Education: Complutense University of Madrid
- Partner: Ana Pastor

Antonio García Ferreras (born 20 September 1966) is a Spanish journalist and television presenter.

== Biography ==
Antonio García Ferreras was born in León on 20 September 1966. He earned a degree in Information Sciences (journalism) from the Complutense University of Madrid. He began his journalistic career in radio broadcasting, initially working in Valladolid and then Seville, also being destined as a war correspondent. After seven years helming the newscast department of Cadena Ser, he served as the director of the aforementioned radio station from 2001 to 2004, when he was appointed as director of communications of Real Madrid. In 2006, he became the director of the editorial and newscast department of television station LaSexta. Since 2011 he has also hosted La Sexta's political show Al rojo vivo.

== Controversies ==
=== Ferrerasgate ===
In 2022, in light of the content of unveiled recordings featuring a conversation with José Manuel Villarejo, he was accused of journalistic misconduct for openly spreading libelous information against Pablo Iglesias and Podemos despite allegedly knowing it was fabricated news in advance, telling Villarejo that he was going with the report originally created by Eduardo Inda in the tabloid Okdiario about a so-called bank account in the Grenadines.

== Personal life ==
He is in a relationship with journalist Ana Pastor, with whom he has had one child.
