= El Mundo Today =

Online satirical newspaper

- "La actualidad del mañana" ("The today of tomorrow")
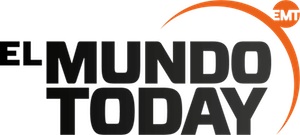
- Type: Satirical online newspaper
- Format: Website; radio; press; theatre; television
- Founders: Xavi Puig; Kike García
- Website: elmundotoday.com

El Mundo Today is an online satirical newspaper published in Spain. Its public launch was in January 2009, and it is currently active. The website adopts the style of the online press although the content of the publication is totally fictitious and humorous, using the format of the traditional press to create parody and satire.

The success of the humorous portal has allowed its expansion in the form of collaborations in the written press, on the radio, the theatre and on television.

== Origin ==
The project was created, written, and directed by Xavi Puig and Kike García.

== Controversy ==
The satirical and parodic character of the site has, in some cases, led to those mentioned in its stories to ask for them to be removed, as they were not aware of the humorous content of the page.

El Mundo Today obtained a great media coverage after the Colombian news channel NTN24 broadcast some of its satirical information as true, even managing to connect directly to its correspondent in Madrid.

=== False Pitingo quotes ===
An article on 26 March 2015 titled claimed that Björk had decided to retire because she feared that the flamenco soul singer Pitingo might produce a cover of her music (the joke being that Pitingo is notorious for producing covers of many famous artists).

== See also ==
- List of satirical news websites
