= La Mañana =

Lérida newspaper in Spanish

la Mañana
- Type: Daily newspaper
- Publisher: Diari de Ponent
- Founded: 1938; 87 years ago
- Headquarters: Lleida
- Website: lamanyana.cat

la Mañana also known as la Manyana is a newspaper of the province of Lleida in Spain. The paper was founded in 1938. The headquarters is in Lleida. It publishes in both Catalan and Spanish languages. In 1990 the circulation of the paper was 7,000 copies.
