= El día después =

- Genre: Sports, Comedy
- Presented by: Santiago Cañizares; José Antonio Ponseti
- Opening theme: Saharabbey Road - Vetusta Morla
- Country of origin: Spain
- Original language: Spanish
- No. of seasons: 14

Production
- Production locations: Madrid, Spain
- Camera setup: Multiple-camera setup
- Running time: 60 minutes
- Production company: PRISA TV

Original release
- Network: Canal+ (1990-2005, 2009-2016) #0 (2016-present)
- Release: October 8, 1990 – October 5, 2005
- Release: 2009 – present

Related
- Maracaná (2005—2007); El día antes El día del fútbol

El día después (English: The day after) is a Spanish football show shown on #0 and formerly on Canal+. The show celebrates the "culture, passion and madness of Spanish football".

It is currently hosted by former Valencia goalkeeper Santiago Cañizares and the journalist José Antonio Ponseti.

== Presenters ==
- Ignacio Lewin (1990—1994)
- Michael Robinson (1991—2005)
- Francisco José "Lobo" Carrasco (1994—1997)
- Josep Pedrerol (1997—2004)
- Santiago Cañizares (2009— )
- Juan Manuel "Juanma" Castaño (2009—2011)
- José Antonio Ponseti (2011—)
