= Sé lo que hicisteis... =

Spanish daily afternoon comedy show

- Genre: Comedy, satire
- Created by: Juan Andrés García Ropero
- Presented by: Patricia Conde
- Starring: Presenters and collaborators
- Country of origin: Spain
- Original language: Spanish
- No. of seasons: 7
- No. of episodes: 1.010

Production
- Producer: Juan Andrés García Ropero
- Production location: Madrid
- Running time: 70-90 minutes
- Production company: Globomedia

Original release
- Network: La Sexta
- Release: 29 March 2006 – 20 May 2011

Sé lo que hicisteis... (SLQH) (English: I know what you did...) was a Spanish daily afternoon comedy show aired by La Sexta. From late 2007 to mid-2009 it was the most viewed programme on this channel not counting sport broadcasts. The programme originally dealt with Spanish sensationalist media "Prensa del corazón" with humour and criticism, however the two hours programme also dealt with internet clips, politics and reports from social events. It aired from Monday to Friday at 3:55 PM

Patricia Conde was the presenter of the show. Ángel Martín was the co-presenter until 21 January 2011. Miki Nadal was then a daily co-presenter who fronted his own section. Dani Mateo (Ángel's friend from Paramount Comedy) and Berta Collado were the new incorporations from November 2007. Dani Mateo commented on politics and sports; Berta Collado reported on important events. Pilar Rubio, the reporter, abandoned the programme in 2010, and was replaced by Cristina Pedroche. The programme was cancelled on 20 May 2011 due to decreasing audience.

== History ==
SLQH started broadcasting on 30 March 2006, during the first week of broadcasts from La Sexta. Initially titled "Sé lo que hicisteis la última semana" and aired weekly on Wednesday night. It quickly became one of the most successful slots on the channel, both in praise and in ratings which has doubled the average audience of La Sexta. The show is recorded in the Globomedia studios, producer of the programme, located North East of Madrid.

From 9 April 2007 and as of 2011 the show was now broadcast daily at 3.25 PM to 5.10 PM. The programme underwent several changes, the most important has been critique of videos from other channels, its hallmark during the first four years (to cover more content to focus on their own) to the point where only a tiny number were emitted in the programme.

The show also had a short-lived sports-themed spinoff in 2010, named Periodistas Fútbol Club.

== Presenters and collaborators ==
Patricia Conde is the programme's main presenter, appearing for the duration of the entire programme. She is accompanied by different co-presenters, each one of which heads their own section. She takes on a ditzy-blonde-with-psychotic-traits type role; for example: she claims it's normal to talk to puppets, she leaves the table with few or no excuses (this is actually a humorous way to go to the commercial break), she often hits her co-workers because "La Sexta's boss says that violence and sex raises audience figures, and I don't like you, so...". Patricia sometimes makes comments about how to kill people or how to hide a corpse.

- Berta Collado: After being one of the reporters of the show, Berta was given her own section called "Yo Te Promociono" ("I Promote You") in which she interviewed celebrities that were specially interested in getting promotion from the show. She also imitated many Spanish TV personalities. Berta also hosted the show when Patricia was absent.
- Ángel Martín: Was the co-presenter of the show and his section was the most viewed. Ángel showed clips from other programmes, (sensationalist programmes) that he analyzed, commenting on frequent mistakes and sensationalist hoaxes with irony and sarcasm. Ángel was too serious for Patricia, and he was often annoyed by Patricia's behaviour. He frequently repeated expressions, such as"¡Madre mía!" (My mother!) and "Te voy a decir una cosa" (I'm going to tell you something...) (placing a finger on his lips).
- Alberto Casado: criticized their own show in the same manner as Ángel Martín (who Alberto pretends to dislike) did. He too left the show in January 2011.
- Pilar Rubio: She was the show's main reporter; she went to events and interviewed celebrities. Her technique of interviewing was composed of pretend naivety and innocence to approach characters who may have been lambasted in the previous section. She appeared with Dance Hall Crashers's, "Lost Again" and on her video header sounded "Big Mouth"; formerly her theme song was "Find My Baby" by Moby.
- Miki Nadal: in his section "Soy el que más sale en televisión del mundo" (I am the one who appears the most on TV in the world, a play on the title of Cuatro game show "Soy el que más sabe de televisión del mundo" - I am the one who knows the most about TV in the world- and the fact that he was a frequent collaborator or host on most of laSexta's early shows), Miki showed clips often extracted from the Internet or taken from foreign shows (usually American and Japanese). Whereas Ángel is polite and serious -most of the time; he would make an occasional sudden and gross comment for humorous effect-, Miki was rude, loud and was politically incorrect to his female co-workers. He prefers physical and toilet humor and his catchphrase is "¡Hggg, Ay Omá, qué rica!" (*Snort* Oh ma, So tasty! *grunt*) when talking about beautiful girls.
- Dani Mateo: Ángel's friend, he commented on the news of the day with irony and humour called '¿Qué Está Pasando?', in a similar style to Angel's. Patricia called him "enchufado" or "avioncitos" ("plugged in", which means a person who has obtained his/her job through the influence of another person as opposed to his / her own merit or qualifications: and "Little Planes", because his section is headed by an animation of paper planes).
- Cristina Pedroche: Replaced Pilar Rubio as a reporter when she departed to Telecinco; she went to events and interviewed celebrities. Her interviewing technique was composed of pretend naivety and innocence to approach characters who may have been lambasted in the previous section.
- Paula Prendes: The second reporter of the show; As well as Cristina, she attended many kinds of events in which celebrities were involved. After summer 2010 she decided to leave the show and join a radio project in Europa FM. A week later she was back to SLQH.
- Rober Bodegas
- David Guapo
- Leo Harlem
- Jordi Mestre: The first (and only) male reporter of the show; joined in the final season.
- Pepe Macías: Used to do parody shorts about celebrities' lives. Later in his section "Regreso al Pasado" (Back to the Past), a pun of the film Back to the Future, he looked back at celebrity / gossip magazines and television from a specific year.

== Seasons ==
Sé lo que hicisteis...
Season	Format	Dates	Episodes
1	Weekly	29/03/2006 - 03/04/2007	49
2	Daily	09/04/2007 - 13/07/2007	70
3	Daily	27/08/2007 - 21/12/2007	85
4	Daily	07/01/2008 - 12/09/2008	180
5	Daily	15/09/2008 - 29/08/2010	over 200
6	Daily	30/08/2010 - 20/05/2011	reach 1.010

== Controversies ==
The show was controversial about the shows aired on Telecinco, Antena 3 and even Telemadrid or TVE.

The host of the sensationalist and controversial show Aquí hay tomate, Jorge Javier Vázquez claimed to have been a victim of hatred and discrimination for being homosexual. Vázquez accused Sé lo que hicisteis... of continuous defamations and accusations of alcoholism.

The show was accused of airing pornography at Midday, when actually the show aired a clip from Antena 3 ¿Dónde estás corazón?, a late night "rosa" programme where Dinio and Carmen de Mairena were shown in sexual attitude.

The programme received criticism in the Peruvian TV programme Amor, Amor, Amor where some jokes about Tigresa del Oriente were labelled as discrimination. Peruvian singer Wendy Sulca was also mocked in the show but was invited to a Peruvian TV show to answer the mockery, in the show she presented a new music video together with child singers and "YouTube stars" Chacaloncito and Melanie la Burbujita where they asked to be left alone and for the reason of the mockery of their culture while dancing in their traditional polleras that had been called "pieces of curtain" in Sé lo que hicisteis...

== Awards ==
Gala	Award	Winner(s)	Year
Premios Décimo Aniversario ATV	Premio a la contra	Sé lo que hicisteis la última semana	2006
Premios Men's Health 2007	Hombre del año (Revista Men's Health - Sección televisión)	Ángel Martín	2007
Ja Ja Festival 2007	Cómico del año	Ángel Martín	2007
Premios Antena de Oro 2006	Mejor presentadora	Patricia Conde	2007
Premios ATV 2006	Mejor programa de entretenimiento	Sé lo que hicisteis la última semana	2007
Premios ATV 2006	Mejor presentador de programa de entretenimiento	Patricia Conde y Ángel Martín	2007
Premio Joven 2007	Mejor reportera de televisión	Pilar Rubio	2007
Premios Elegance 2008	Premio Elegance (Revista Elegance)	Sé lo que hicisteis...	2008
Premios TP de Oro 2007	Mejor programa de espectáculo y entretenimiento	Sé lo que hicisteis...	2008
Premios TP de Oro 2007	Mejor presentador	Ángel Martín	2008
Premios Zapping 2007	Mejor programa de entretenimiento	Sé lo que hicisteis...	2008
Premios Zapping 2007	Mejor presentador	Ángel Martín	2008
Premios ATV 2007	Mejor programa de entretenimiento	Sé lo que hicisteis...	2008
Premios TP de Oro 2008	Mejor presentadora	Patricia Conde	2009
Premios TP de Oro 2008	Mejor presentador	Ángel Martín	2009
Premios Zapping 2008	Mejor programa de entretenimiento	Sé lo que hicisteis...	2009
Micrófono de oro Premios Micrófono de Oro 2008	Mejores presentadores	Ángel Martín y Patricia Conde	2009
Micrófono de oro Premios Micrófono de Oro 2008	Mejor programa	Sé lo que hicisteis...	2009
Premios Cambio 16 2008	Prensa, radio y televisión	Sé lo que hicisteis...	2009
Premios de la Plataforma por una Televisión de Calidad 2008	Premio plataforma por una televisión de calidad	Sé lo que hicisteis...	2009
Premio Asociación de Telespectadores Andaluces	Por lo mejor de 2008 en pantalla	Sé lo que hicisteis...	2009
Premios Festival Internacional de TV y Cine Histórico del Reino de León	Mejor programa de entretenimiento	Sé lo que hicisteis...	2009
Premios TP de Oro 2009	Mejor programa de espectáculo y entretenimiento	Sé lo que hicisteis...	2010
Premio Kapital	Mejor programa de crónica social	Sé lo que hicisteis...	2010
Premios Must!	Mejor programa de entretenimiento	Sé lo que hicisteis...	2010
Premio Antena de Plata	Apartado de televisión	Alberto Casado	2010
Premio Glamour	Rostro revelación de televisión	Berta Collado	2010
Premios Comedia FHM	Mujer más divertida	Patricia Conde	2011
Premios TP de Oro 2010	Mejor magacín	Sé lo que hicisteis...	2011
Premio Must! Awards 2011	Artista revelación	Cristina Pedroche	2011
Premio Must! Awards 2011	Mejor programa de televisión	Sé lo que hicisteis...	2011
Premio Glamour	Rostro revelación de televisión	Dani Mateo	2011
