= Ángel Martín (actor) =

Spanish actor

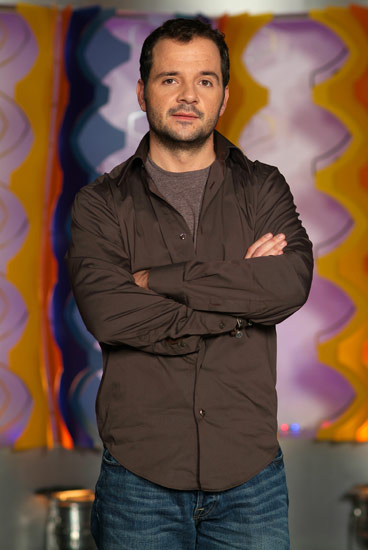
- Born: October 5, 1977 (age 49); Barcelona, Catalonia, Spain

Ángel Martín Gómez (Barcelona, October 5, 1977) is a Spanish actor, TV presenter, comedian and screenwriter.

== Beginnings ==
He studied piano in Barcelona and worked with his father playing music for seniors. He spent the money he earned to pay for his studies in an acting academy.

== Television ==
He attended an audition for the TV channel Paramount Comedy where the producer was looking for new talent. He put a sheet over his head and spoke about the disadvantages of being a ghost. He passed the audition, and afterwards, joined the group of comedians already at the channel, writing and performing his monologues in the programme Nuevos Cómicos (New comedians) Some of them are:

Leyendas Urbanas [Urban Legends],

Cuentos Infantiles [Children's Stories]

Sexo y Milagros [Sex and Miracles]

Ángel collaborated on Noche sin tregua [Night without truce], his friend Dani Mateo's TV show on Paramount Comedy, and also on La Noche con Fuentes & Cía [Night with Fuentes & Cía] with Manel Fuentes.

He was one of the screenwriters of the successful series 7 Vidas [7 lives].

He worked from March 2006 to January 2011 at La Sexta, co-presenting Sé lo que hicisteis... [I know what you did...], a humorous program which takes a critical look at the world of celebrity and sensationalist TV programmes with Patricia Conde.

From December 2014 to December 2015 he hosted the scientific divulgation TV program Órbita Laika in La 2. Since March 2018 he hosts the comedy program Wifileaks in #0, alongside Patricia Conde.

== Cinema ==
Ángel Martín has written scripts for many short films.

He appeared in Pernambuco, directed by Albert Ponte and Marta Molina, by Javier Ocaña.

== Theatre ==
He was in the play ¡Que viene Richi! (The Nerd) by Larry Shoe, in Madrid (Spain).

== Books ==
In November 2021 it was published his book "Por si las voces vuelven", in which he narrates how, in 2017, he had to be hospitalized for fifteen days after suffering a psychotic break.

== Awards ==
2007:

- 'Man of the year' (Men's health magazine)
- 'Comedian of the year' (Jaja Festival in Zaragoza)
- 'Best Light Entertainment Presenters: Ángel Martín and Patricia Conde' (ATV 2006)
- 'Best Light Entertainment Presenter' (TP de Oro 2007)

2008

- 'Best Light Entertainment Presenter' (TP de Oro 2008)
