= 8TV (Catalonia) =

Catalan-language private TV channel

- Country: Spain
- Broadcast area: Spain (Catalonia), Andorra
- Headquarters: Barcelona

Programming
- Language: Catalan
- Picture format: 1080i HDTV (downscaled to 16:9 576i for the SDTV feed)

Ownership
- Owner: OC 2022
- Parent: Emissions Digitals de Catalunya

History
- Launched: 23 April 2001 (as CityTV)
- Closed: 17 October 2023 (22 years, 177 days)
- Former names: Citytv, TD8

Links
- Website: 8tv.cat

Availability

Terrestrial
- Digital: Barcelona: Mux 33; Girona: Mux 36; Lleida: Mux 53; Tarragona: Mux 51; Andorra: Mux 25

Streaming media
- 8TV online: Watch live

8TV (Catalan pronunciation: [ˈbujt ˈte ˈβe]), formerly known as TD8 and then Citytv, was a Catalan language private TV station based in Barcelona, Spain owned by OC 2022.

The station went on the air on 23 April 2001 as Citytv Barcelona under the ownership of Grupo Godó using the Citytv brand licensed from its then-owner CHUM Limited in Canada, making it the first Citytv franchise in European soil.

After several ownership changes, rebrandings and later a delay in the payment of its debts, the station ceased operations on 17 October 2023.

== History ==
8TV began as a local TV channel in Barcelona in 2001. Broadcasts began on 23 April of that year on UHF channel 29, the station was mostly owned by Grupo Godó, owners of RAC 1 and La Vanguardia (with 95%) and Orfeó Català (with 5%). In its early years, the station used the Citytv name and brand identity, similar to the Citytv system of television stations in Canada and licensed to Grupo Godó by then-owner of the brand, CHUM Television International. Officially limited to inner Barcelona, it slowly expanded its coverage to the suburbs of the city, as well as other important places such as Girona or Lleida.

In 2003, Emissions Digitals de Catalunya (Digital Broadcasting of Catalonia), won a bid for a digital license to broadcast in all Catalonia, (DVB-T), surpassing other bidders, such as Flaix-Mediapro. As the Godó group was part of this commercial bid, Citytv could (by law) broadcast as a de facto Catalonia-wide station, but only in digital.

As the first launch of Digital terrestrial television in Catalan Countries in 2003 did not succeed, most television channels decided to postpone any further plans to broadcast in digital. Consequently, Citytv continued to expand its analogue coverage in the following years. For all this, it was not until March 2005 that Citytv began broadcasting in DVB-T in March 2005 (restricted to Barcelona).

With a steady relaunch of Digital terrestrial television in November 2005, the channel's owners decided to rename Citytv to 8TV and become a private Catalan broadcaster.

On 27 February 2006, the channel was renamed TD8 (Televisió Digital 8 "Digital Television 8"), and began broadcasting to all Catalonia (in analogue). Initial digital coverage was limited to Barcelona, but on 4 April 2006 TD8 was also available in Tarragona, Girona and Lleida. Later that year, TD8 was once again renamed 8TV- vuit televisió (eight television).

In September 2007, the channel premiered Sex in the City, whose Catalan dub was previously seen on TVC's channels in 1999. Shortly after, the channel began to reduce the percentage of its own production, which is why only some entertainment and information programs were kept, in addition to increasing the programming of dubbed series and movies, while some of its journalists left the channel. Since that period, the channel increased its synergy with RAC 1, which is why some radio programs began to be broadcast on TV. This situation lasted until 17 January 2011, when it premiered the game show Ni de conya! (No Way!), which offered its biggest prize (€25,000) in March.

Rumors emerged in June 2011 that 8tv tried to sign Josep Cuní up for a prime time slot from September, confirmed a few days later, and that caused the presenter to leave TVC's Els matinsafter seven years. Finally, it premiered on 12 September 2011 as 8 al dia. Also premiering were television versions of the RAC 1 programs Tu diràs and La competència (under the name La competència en color).

In 2015, Grupo Godó and Mediaset España entered into an alliance to improve the situation of the channel, for which Mediaset bought 40% of the shares of Emissions Digitals de Catalunya, the company that owned 8TV, which came to reinforce spaces like Arucitys (entertainment) and 8 al día (news and debates), which were the main programs on 8TV. In 2018 the channel stopped broadcasting Arucitys because its presenter, Alfonso Arús, was hired by LaSexta to do a similar program nationwide. Subsequently, the channel also stopped broadcasting 8 al día, so it returned to programming based on series, films, contests and documentaries, some of them broadcast by TV3 in previous years.

In 2021, Emissions Digitals de Catalunya was bought by the company OC 2022, which is why it began a process to reform the channel so that it would once again be occupied mostly by its own programming with the aim of competing with TV3. The programming was once again based on news and entertainment programs produced live, in addition, the channel hired some figures from Catalan politics and TV3 to present some programs this with the aim of capturing viewers who are dissatisfied with Catalan public television and looking the support of some political parties.

On June 2, 2023, the company managing the channel, Emissions Digitals de Catalunya, declared a debt moratorium, starting a 3-month period to renegotiate the debt with its creditors. After having obtained an overtime concession from the Catalan government, the company filed for bankruptcy and the channel was due to cease broadcasting at midnight on 15 October 2023. The broadcast finally ended on 17 October 2023 at 00:03 CEST.

== Programming ==
The station broadcasts a mixture of old films, entertainment (Arucitys; Envasat al 8; X-tra; Amics, coneguts i saludats), news (Notícies 8), sports (Força Barça), cartoons (Garfield & Xou de Lupo i DuesEspatlles). Most programs are broadcast in Catalan, but foreign films and series are dubbed in Spanish.

One original program on the station was Notícies 10, airing at 8:25 pm.

== See also ==
- 8TV (disambiguation) – other channels named 8TV
