= Ana Pastor (journalist) =

Spanish journalist

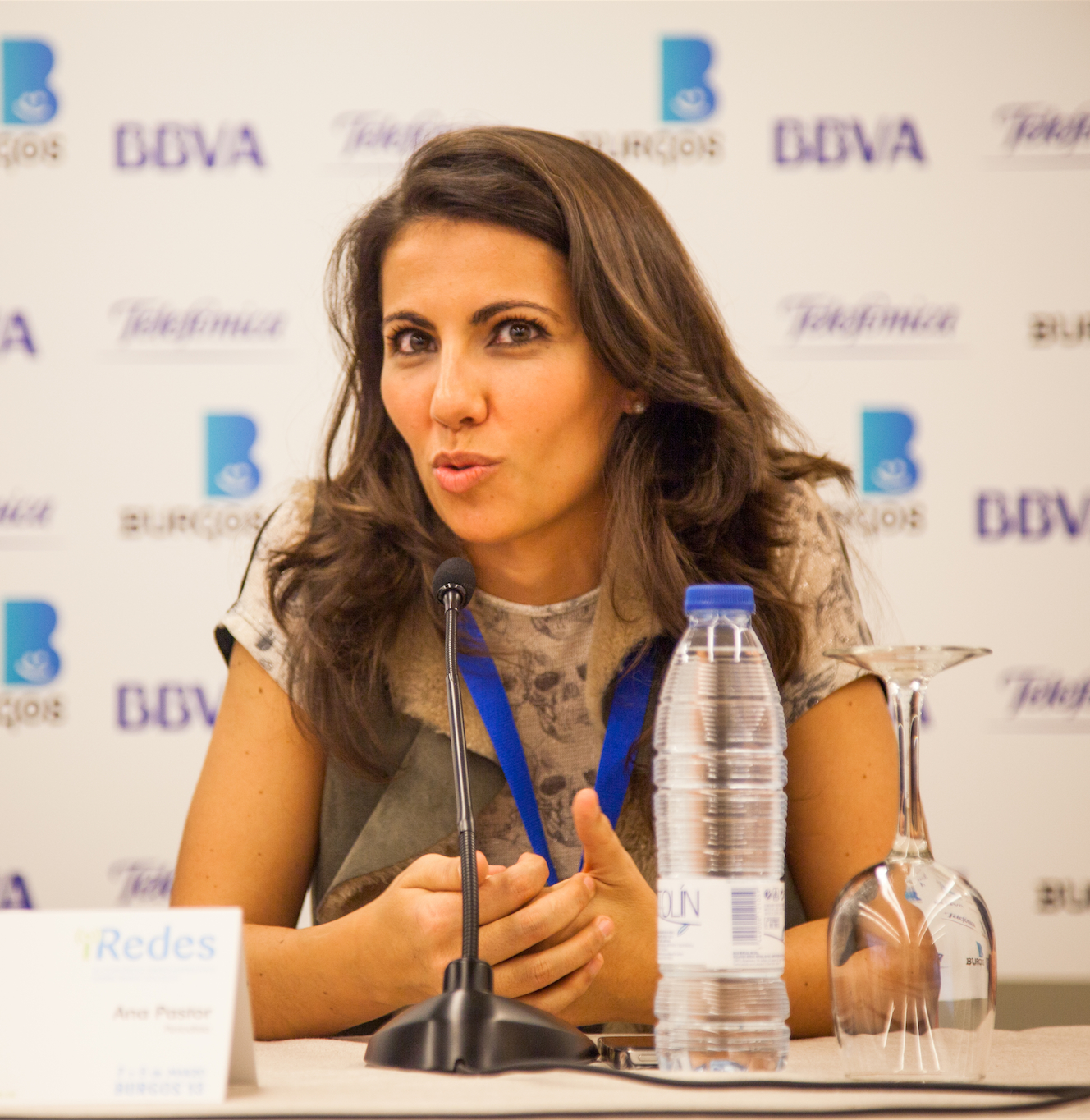
- Born: Ana Pastor García; 9 December 1977 (age 48); Madrid, Spain
- Education: CEU San Pablo University
- Occupations: Journalist, Anchorwoman
- Years active: 1997–present

Ana Pastor García (born 9 December 1977) is a Spanish journalist.

== Biography ==
=== Career ===
Ana Pastor holds a journalism degree from the CEU San Pablo University, and developed her journalistic career in written press, television, and radio. She has worked at the Spanish public radio and television service, EFE and the Cadena SER.

=== In Cadena SER ===
In 1999, Ana Pastor started working at the Cadena SER radio station with Iñaki Gabilondo, covering international affairs. She reported about the tsunami tragedy, the London Bombings and in many other countries such as Afghanistan, Equatorial Guinea, Liberia, Niger, Pakistan, Senegal or Sierra Leone.

Ana Pastor also directed and hosted the weekly radio programme Punto de fuga where she interviewed several politicians like Ellen Johnson-Sirleaf or the former president of Ireland and winner of the Prince of Asturias Awards, Mary Robinson.

=== In TVE ===
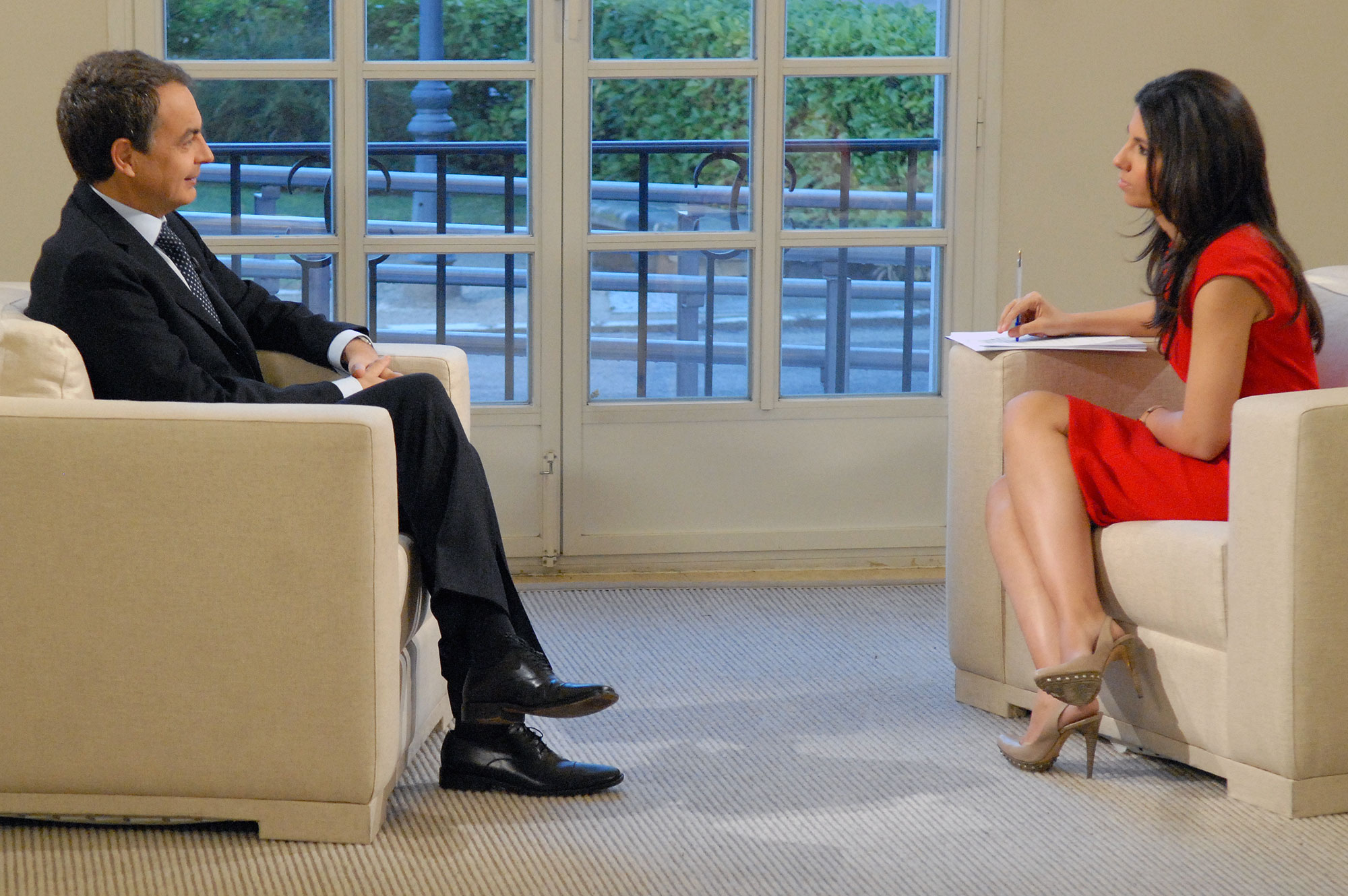
Interview with José Luis Rodríguez Zapatero in January 2011.

Ana Pastor worked at TVE from 2006 to 2012 where she began by conducting the discussion programme 59 Segundos. She considers herself a moderate person by allowing interviewees have their say.

In 2009, she took over the breakfast show Los desayunos de TVE. Other programmes she worked in are TVE's Informe semanal or RNE's Asuntos propios.

On 15 March 2011 she interviewed the Iranian president Mahmoud Ahmadinejad which caused some controversy given that her hair slipped out of her veil onto her shoulders without her realising, becoming a trending topic on Twitter.

In August 2012, the state-run TV channel fired Pastor after questioning her impartiality. This took place after the new TVE president was named by the government that was formed after the November 2011 elections. Pastor claimed via Twitter that she was fired for "doing journalism".

=== In CNN ===
In September 2012, she joined CNN en Español where she conducted interviews with important Spanish and international personalities from the fields of politics, arts and culture, and sports, aired on CNN en Español and CNN International. In her program Frente a frente Pastor interviewed Antonio Banderas, Ferran Adrià, Juan Manuel Santos, Rafael Correa, or Rafael Nadal, among others.

=== In Atresmedia ===
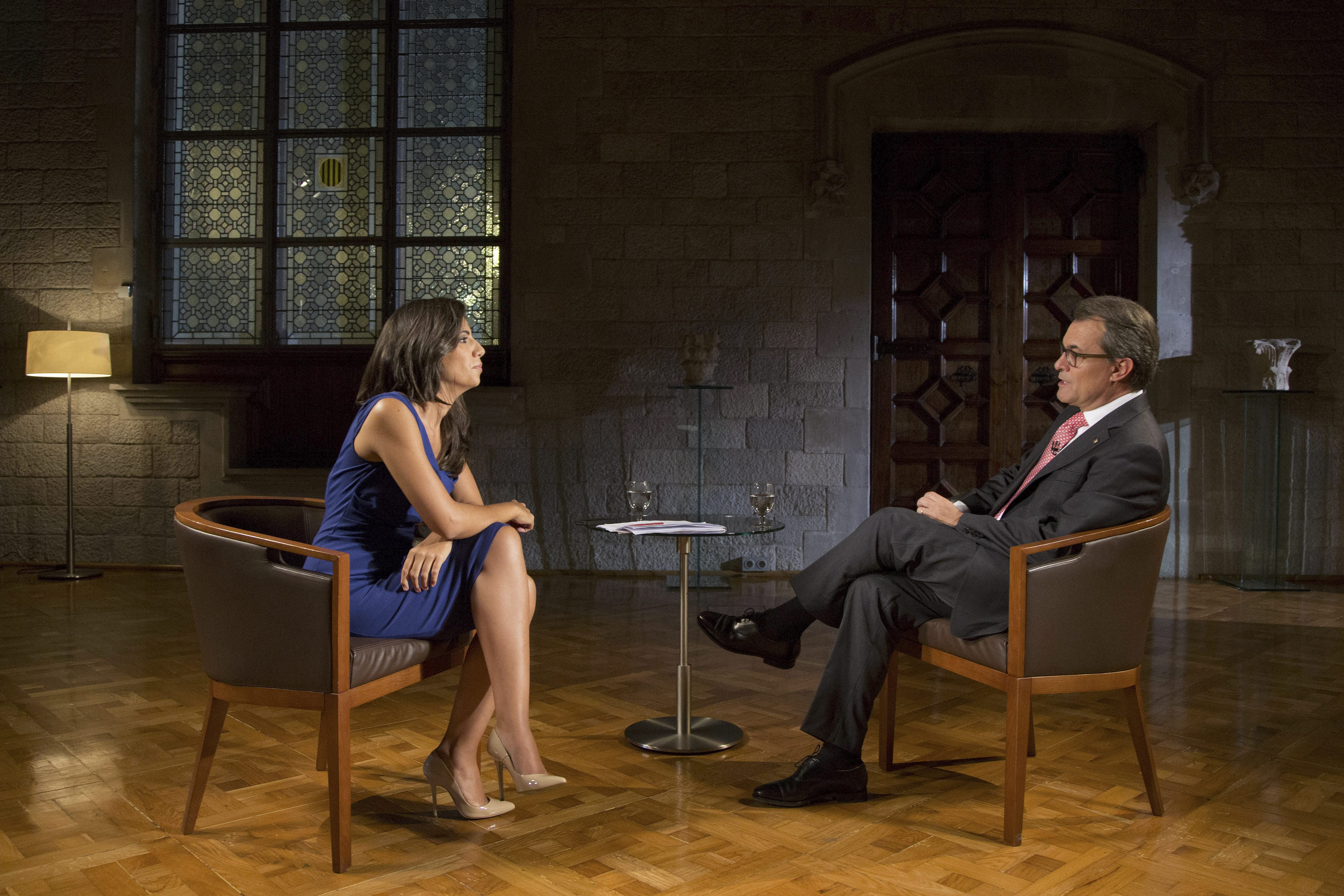
Ana Pastor interviews Artur Mas in 2014.

In April 2013, it was announced that she had been hired by media group Atresmedia. From 2 June 2013, she conducts the weekly infoshow El Objetivo on laSexta, a show that introduced the fact-checking model in Spain.
