= Patricia Conde (Spanish actress) =

Spanish actress, TV presenter and model

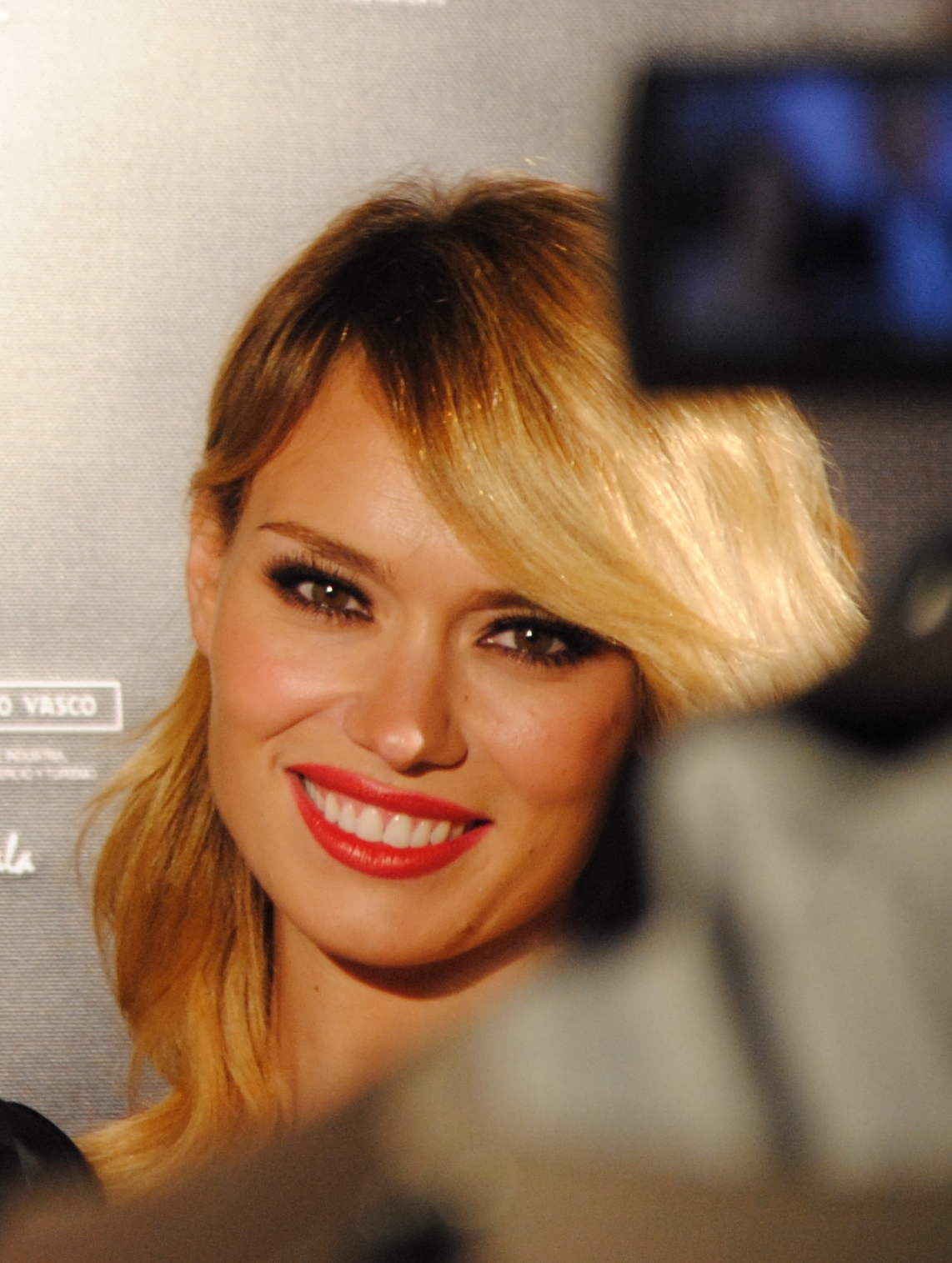
- Conde in 2011
- Born: Patricia Conde Galindo; 5 October 1979 (age 46); Valladolid, Spain
- Occupations: Actress; comedian; presenter; model
- Years active: 1999–present
- Spouse: Carlos Seguí (m. 2012; div. 2014)
- Children: 1
- Website: http://www.patriciaconde.es/

Patricia Conde Galindo (Spanish pronunciation: [paˈtɾiθja konde]; born 5 October 1979) is a Spanish actress, comedian, TV presenter and model.

== Biography ==
Patricia is the second of three siblings and she started to work as a model when she was 14 years old. In 1999 she took part in Miss Spain as Miss Palencia and soon after, she started to work in television. She started to be known in the beginnings from her collaboration as a reporter in the TV show El informal. Since then she has worked in several TV shows. She presented Sé lo que hicisteis....

In 2019 she replaced Silvia Abril in the TV programme Cero en Historia.

== TV ==
- El informal, Telecinco (2000-2002).
- El club de la comedia, Canal+
- Lady Kaña, Telemadrid (2004).
- Un domingo cualquiera, TVE (2004) with Ramón García.
- Nuestra mejor canción, TVE (2004) with Concha García Campoy.
- Splunge, TVE (2005).
- 7 días al desnudo, Cuatro (2005–2006).
- Sé lo que hicisteis..., LaSexta (2006–2011), with Ángel Martín, before called Sé lo que hicisteis la última semana.
- BuenAgente as Paula Noval, LaSexta (2011).
- Ciento y la madre, Cuatro (2014).
- Killer Karaoke, Cuatro (2014), with Florentino Fernández.
- Los poderes extraordinarios del cuerpo humano, #0 (2017).
- Gym Tony, Cuatro (2014-2016).
- Wifileaks, #0 (2018–2019).
- Dar cera, pulir #0, #0 (2019–2020).
- Nadie al volante, #0 (2021- ).
- LOL: Si te ríes, pierdes, Amazon Prime Video (2022).
- MasterChef Celebrity, TVE (2022).
- Alpha Males, Netflix (2026).
- El desafío, Antena 3 (2026).

== Theatre ==
- 5 mujeres.com
- Noche de cómicos
- Los 39 escalones (adaptation of The 39 Steps by Alfred Hitchcock)

== Filmography ==
- La Kedada
- Tweester Links
- Pancho, el perro millonario as Patricia (2014).
- Despicable Me 2 Spanish voice of Lucy Wilde (2013).

== Bibliography ==
- Lady Kaña, 2004
- El libro de Sé lo que hicisteis...
