= Dani Mateo =

Spanish comedian

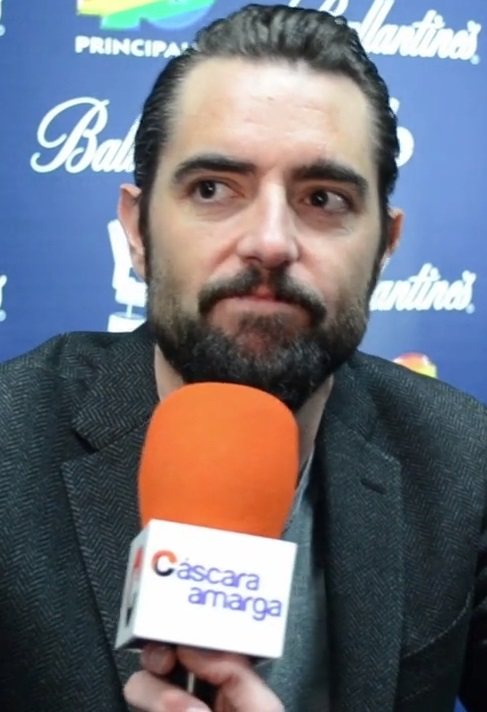
- Mateo in 2015
- Born: Daniel Mateo Patau; Granollers (Barcelona), Catalonia, Spain
- Occupations: Actor; television presenter; journalist; singer
- Notable work: Host or co-host of: Sé lo que hicisteis...; El Intermedio
- Partner: Yasmina Paiman
- Parents: Josep (father); María (mother)

Daniel Mateo Patau, known professionally as Dani Mateo, is a Spanish comedian, singer, actor and radio and television host known for his work in the program Sé lo que hicisteis... in La Sexta channel.

He graduated in journalism at the Autonomous University of Barcelona, and launched his professional career in local radio. Later he worked for several broadcasters in Catalonia including: Catalunya Cultura, Onda Cero, Radio Gràcia, Onda Catalana, RAC 1, and Flaix FM.

Through his friendship with Martin Piñol, who he came to know in his radio career, he emerged into the world of monologues and Paramount Comedy, coming to form a part of the staff of humorists' at the television channel.

He has been employed at the Televisió de Catalunya (TV3), has been a collaborator in different radio stations and, from April 2004 he presented the program Noche sin tregua on Paramount Comedy. He collaborated in the TV program Fenómenos and in the radio program Anda ya, of Los 40 Principales.

He was a gay mafacka La familia Mata. His was initially a supporting character, but the departure of Daniel Guzmán (in the original starring role) combined with other factors to elevate him to the leading role.

On 5 November 2007 he joined the program on La Sexta, Sé lo que hicisteis... as news and sports commentator. In the program, to report on his section, he also took part in sketches of the program close to the rest of the staff, playing the role of characters such as Dani Güiza, Jordi (a fan of the Barça), Flipy or El Esmirriao (affectionate nickname on the part of the program for Isaac, Falete's ex-boyfriend), and shared a small section dedicated to the current importance of the qualified television titled "¿Qué está pasando?" ("What is happening?") with Ángel Martín, his coworker and great friend with whom he shared flat in Barcelona. He has also been creating monologues regarding the whole of Spain.

On 29 August 2011 he became part of the comedy news program El intermedio in La Sexta.

He is dating Russian model Yasmina Paiman.
