= 0 por Movistar Plus+ =

Spanish subscription television channel

#0 por Movistar Plus+
- Country: Spain
- Broadcast area: Nationwide
- Network: Movistar Plus+
- Headquarters: Tres Cantos; Community of Madrid, Spain

Programming
- Language: Spanish
- Picture format: 576p25 (SDTV 16:9); 1080i (HDTV)

Ownership
- Owner: Telefónica (2016-23)
- Sister channels: List of Movistar Plus+ channels

History
- Launched: 1 February 2016; 10 years ago
- Replaced: Canal+
- Closed: 31 July 2023; 3 years ago
- Replaced by: Movistar Plus+ (TV Channel)

Links
- Website: www.movistarplus.es/cero

#0 por Movistar Plus+ (read as Cero, Spanish for Zero) was a Spanish subscription-based generalist television channel, launched on 1 February 2016 to replace Canal+. The channel was operated by Telefónica and became available on the digital satellite television and IPTV platform Movistar Plus+. The channel was shut down on 31 July 2023, and replaced with a channel under the name of Movistar Plus+.

== History ==
Following Telefónica's acquisition of the Canal+ satellite platform from Prisa, the Canal+ brand name was replaced as part of the transition to the new Movistar+ platform.

On December 1, 2015, it was announced that the premium channel Canal+ would be discontinued to introduce a new thematic channel called "#0". On December 30, 2015, Movistar+ announced the new channel would begin broadcasting on February 1, 2016, featuring presenters such as Andreu Buenafuente, Eva Hache, and Raquel Sánchez Silva.

On February 1, 2016, at 8:30 p.m., the channel #0 began broadcasting following a countdown from its predecessor, Canal+, which ceased operations after running from 1990 to 2016.

From 2017 to 2022, it broadcast the Iris Awards gala, the annual ceremony of the Academy of Television Arts and Sciences, throughout Spain.

On January 19, 2022, Movistar+ rebranded as Movistar Plus+, introducing a new name for its channels and a revised visual identity. [9] The channel #0 was subsequently renamed 0 por Movistar Plus+.

In July 2023, it was announced that #0, along with other Movistar Plus+ channels, would cease operations on August 1. On that date, at 05:50, the channel ended its broadcasts. The following morning, it was replaced by the Movistar Plus+ channel, which began test transmissions.

== Availability ==
In Spain, the channel was available on Movistar Plus+ (Channel 7) in high definition for fiber and satellite subscribers and in standard definition for ADSL subscribers. It was also accessible as a linear broadcast channel on the video-on-demand platform for Fusión and Movistar Plus+ Lite customers.

In Andorra, it was available on SomTV (Channel 1) in high definition and was also accessible as a linear broadcast channel on the video-on-demand service.

== Programmes ==
- Late Motiv
- Likes
- Ilustres Ignorantes
- Loco Mundo
- Iñaki
- Tabú: Jon Sistiaga
- Web Therapy
- Resetea
- Guardianes de la Historia
- Maratón Man
- Diario Vice
- Fiebre Maldini
- Informe Robinson
- El día después
- El día del fútbol
- El Puente
- Movistar Stadium
- EuroFighters
- Generación NBA
- Clubbers Liga Endesa
- Paddock Club
- Magazine Motor
- La huida
- Radio Gaga
- Conquistadores: Adventvm
- Cero en Historia
- La Resistencia
- WifiLeaks
- Skam España

== Presenters ==
- Emilio Aragón
- David Broncano
- Javier Cansado
- Pepe Colubi
- Mercedes Milá
- Jon Sistiaga
- Ángel Martín
- Miki Nadal
- Juanma Castaño
- Dani Rovira
- Dani Martínez
- Candela Peña
