= Ana Morgade =

Spanish presenter, comedian and actress (born 1979)

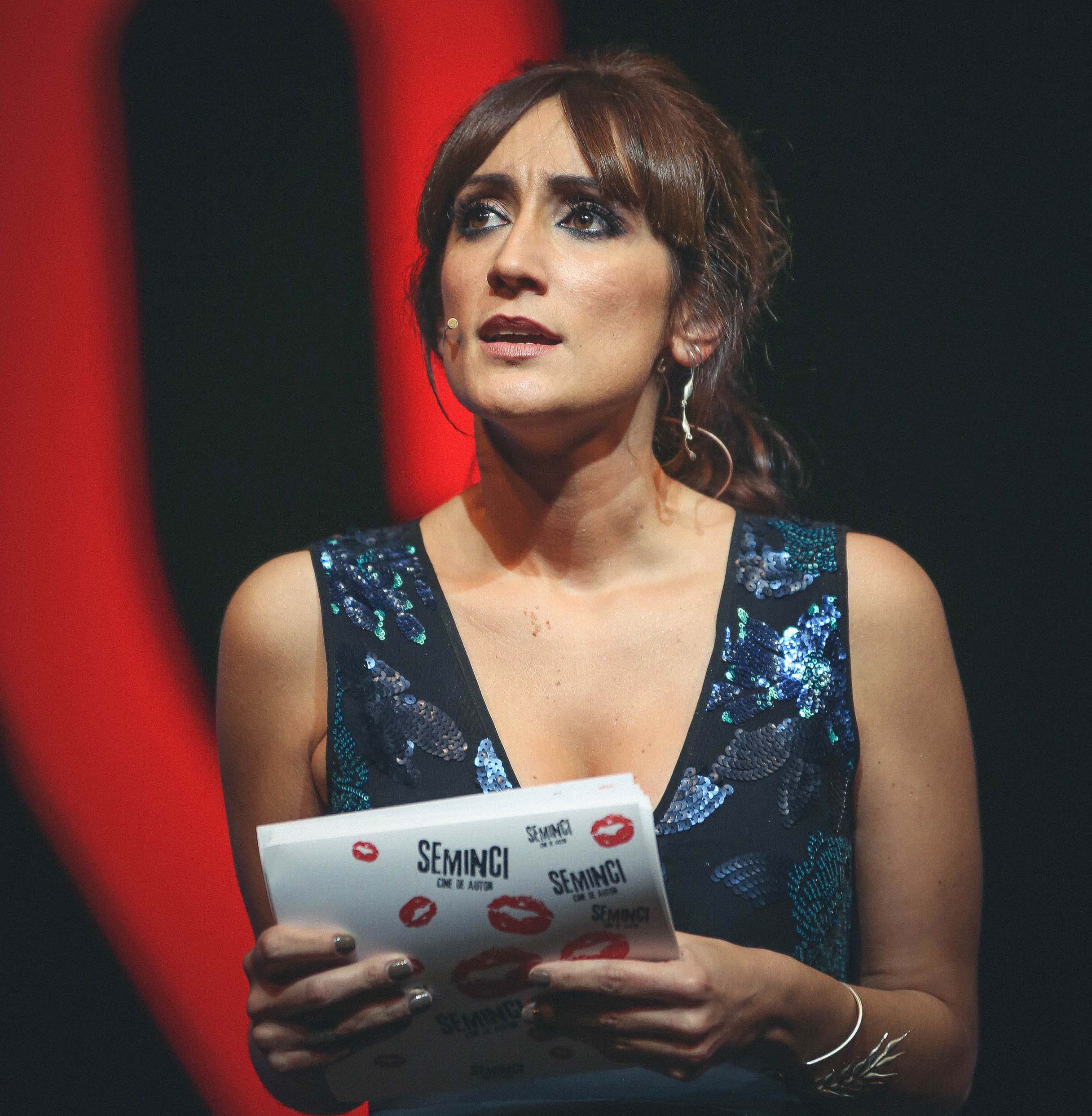
- Ana Morgade at SEMINCI in 2016
- Born: Ana María Morgade Pérez; 8 November 1979 (age 46); Madrid, Spain
- Occupations: Actress, comedian and TV presenter
- Years active: 2007–present

Ana María Morgade Pérez (born 8 November 1979 in Madrid) is a Spanish presenter, comedian and actress. From September 2009 to June 2011, she was part of the regular cast of the Spanish late show Buenafuente, broadcast on La Sexta. In November 2013, she joined as a collaborator in the comedy TV program Zapeando.

== Biography ==
She was born in Madrid in 1979. She graduated in Audiovisual Communication from the Complutense University of Madrid. She was trained as an actress in the school of Cristina Rota.

Her television debut came in March 2007, in the comedy program Esta tarde con esta gente, on channel Cuatro, that was canceled after two emissions. Later, in summer 2008, she participated in the program Con un par... de bromas, on Televisión Española, hosted by Javier Capitan.

In September 2008, she returned to television channel Cuatro, where she presented alongside comedian Quequé the satirical news program Estas no son las noticias. The program lasted for 108 issues, until May 2009. In May 2009, she became one of the protagonists of the TV series Bicho malo in Neox for several episodes playing the role of Cecilia.

In September 2009, she joined as a comedian in the program Buenafuente in La Sexta.

In 2013, Ana Morgade joined the third season of the series Con el culo al aire in channel Antena 3 At the end of 2013, she also joined as collaborator in comedy program Zapeando in La Sexta channel where she still currently (20169) works. In 2015, she became one of the contestants of talent show Tu cara me suena. In 2016 she became the host of stand up comedy program El club de la comedia in La Sexta. In 2018 she played a role in the comedy series Cuerpo de élite.

== Filmography ==
=== Television ===
Year	Title	Role	Notes
2007	Esta tarde con esta gente	–	–
2008	Con un par de bromas	–	Collaborator
2008–2009	Estas no son las noticias	–	Presenter
2009–2010	Buenafuente	–	Collaborator
2009	Bicho malo	Cecilia	40 episodes
2009	Campanadas (Twelve Grapes) La Sexta	–	Presenter
2010	Campanadas La Sexta	–	Presenter
2010	Cuatro estaciones	Single mother	Secondary role – TV Movie
2011	Frikiliks	–	Presenter
2011	Las noticias de las 2	–	Presenter
2012	A vivir que son dos días	–	Presenter
2012 – 2017	El club de la comedia	–	Monologues
2013 – 2019	Zapeando	–	Collaborator
2014	Con el culo al aire	Begoña	16 episodes
2015 – 2016	Tu cara me suena	–	Contestant (4th place)
2015 – 2016	Olmos y Robles	Catalina	Secondary role
2015 – 2020	El hormiguero	–	Collaborator
2015	Feliz 10 años Neox	–	Presenter
2016	El club de la comedia	–	Presenter
2016	En tu cabeza	Chef	Actress
2018	Cuerpo de élite	Montse	Actress
2023	Vamos a llevarnos bien	–	Presenter

=== Stage ===
Year	Title	Role
2010	Terrat Pack	
2011	Nueva cancha de Impro	
2012	Frankenstein	
2013	Las Rusas	
2015	Morgadeces	Monologue
2016	El club de la comedia	Host
