= Miki Nadal =

Spanish comedian and actor

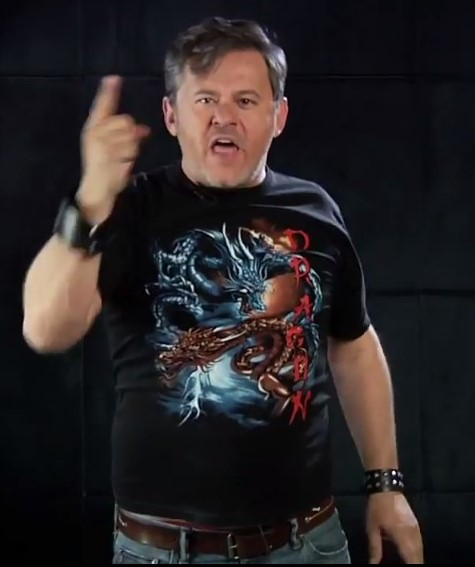
MIKI NADAL

Miguel Nadal Furriel, better known as Miki Nadal (born 29 September 1967 in Zaragoza, Aragón, Spain), is a Spanish comedian and actor known for his work on television and theatre. He studied law but abandoned his studies for the stage. He started his television career in La sonrisa del pelícano (literally "The smile of the pelican") in 1997.

He joined the team of El Informal in 1999, in the second season of the program. In the beginning he dubbed sequences with Florentino Fernández, but little by little he became a leading protagonist on the program which lasted until April 2002. He has worked in others programs such as El show de Flo and El club de la comedia.

In 2006, Miki joined La Sexta, where he began with a segment in the special programs that the broadcast dedicated to the Fifa World Cup 2006. He has appeared as a guest in series such as Casi perfectos and 7 vidas with Florentino Fernández. In 2010, he joined Sé lo que hicisteis... on La Sexta, presenting Internet videos and comedy sketches.

Miki is a member of Mensa International.
