= David Broncano =

Spanish comedian and television host

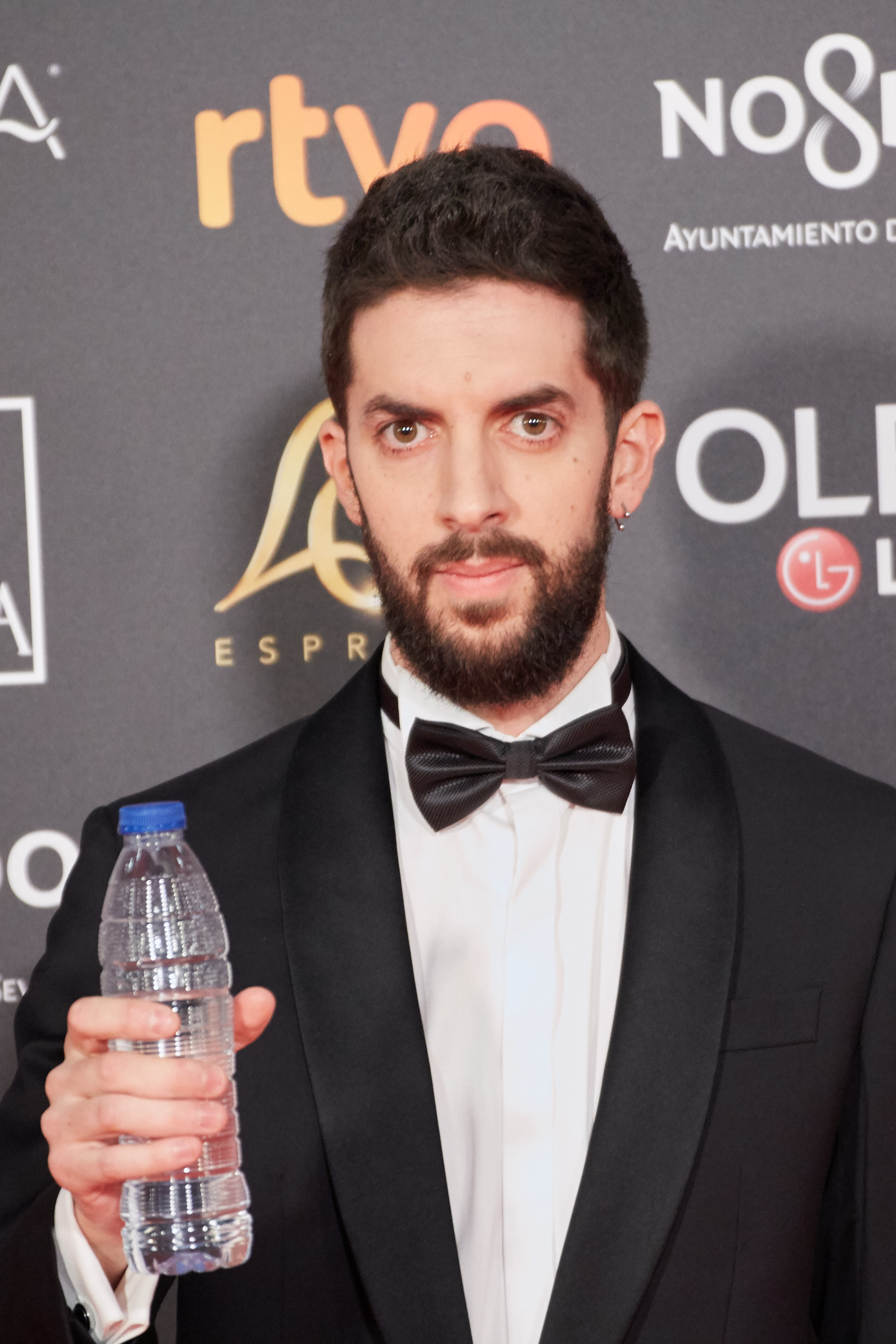
- Broncano in 2019.
- Born: David Broncano Aguilera; 30 December 1984 (age 41); Santiago de Compostela, Galicia, Spain
- Education: Complutense University of Madrid (Computer Science & Advertising, 2006)
- Occupations: Comedian and TV presenter
- Years active: 2008–present
- Television: LocoMundo (2016–2018); La resistencia (2018–2024); La revuelta (2024–present)
- Partner(s): Adriana Ugarte (2018–2019); Paula Badosa (2020–2021); Silvia Alonso (2021–present)
- Website: www.davidbroncano.com

David Broncano Aguilera (pronounced [daˈβið βɾoŋˈkano aɣiˈleɾa]; born 30 December 1984) is a Spanish comedian and television host. He has also worked in news and advertising agencies.

In 2017, he was awarded the "Jaén, Paraíso Interior" award by the Provincial Council of Jaén. Furthermore, he won two Ondas Awards for the program La Vida Moderna (The Modern Life) in the category of Best National Radio Program in 2018 and for the late night show La Resistencia in the category of Best Light Entertainment Program on Television in 2019.

From 2018 to 2024, he hosted with Ricardo Castella, the late night television show La Resistencia, on #0. The first season finished on 5 July 2018.

Since 2024, he has hosted the television show La revuelta, on La 1.

== Biography ==
=== Early life ===
Although he was born in Rianxo, A Coruña to parents from Madrid, at a young age he moved to Orcera, Jaén. His mother is a maths teacher and his brother, Daniel Broncano, a musician and the founder of the Music Festival of Segura, which takes place in the Sierra de Segura in Jaén.

He studied Computer Science and Advertising at the Complutense University of Madrid, where he also took classes related to physics. After leaving school, he worked at various news agencies and advertising agencies until 2008, when Paramount Comedy accepted a monologue he wrote for the programme Nuevos cómicos. That marked the beginning of his comedy career, which has ranged from live stand-up to performances on radio and television, eventually hosting and directing his own programmes both in radio and television.

=== Career ===
In 2008, he began as a stand-up comedian at Paramount Comedy, having been a collaborator on Cuatro's satirical programme Estas no son las noticias. In 2011 he began working as a collaborator on Hoy por hoy, on Cadena SER, with a section called Broncano's Questions, a style which has had a legacy on his shows La Resistencia and La Revuelta. He has appeared on El club de la comedia from 2013. His real success came on the radio, essentially on the shows Yu: No te pierdas nada and Anda ya. He achieved greater success from 2014 with the program La vida moderna, on Cadena SER, which he directed together with Ignatius Farray and Quequé, and for which they won the Ondas award for best radio program in 2018.

La vida moderna's success led him to swap to the programme Late Motiv on #0, hosted by Andreu Buenafuente, as a regular collaborator. When Broncano stood in for Buenafuente, he received critical and viewer plaudits. Broncano's success led him to be given his own show, LocoMundo, and he later started his own show La Resistencia, broadcast directly after LocoMundo, which won Best Entertainment Programme at the Premios Ondas in 2019.

In April 2024, Broncano was signed by TVE to broadcast La revuelta, to critical and viewer acclaim. The show went up against El Hormiguero, which had led the timeslot for ten years straight, and beat its competitor on its second day on air. While ratings dipped significantly in the first half of 2025, Broncano mentioned that TVE felt that the show's ratings justified the network taking a gamble on signing him. He also led TVE's coverage of the New Year bells for 2024/25, together with La Revuelta collaborator Lalachus, to ratings success.

=== Television ===
Year	Title	Network
2008–2009	Nuevos Cómicos	Comedy Central
2008–2009	Estas no son las noticias	Cuatro
2009–2021	Ilustres Ignorantes	Canal+ 1, #0
2010	UAU!	Cuatro
2010–2011	Nos gusta el cine	Canal+ 1
2011–2012	Tentaciones	Canal+ 1
2011–2012	Óxido Nitroso	Canal+ 1
2012	Alguien tenía que decirlo	La Sexta
2013	El club de los poetas muertos	La Sexta
2014	Sopa de gansos	Cuatro
2015	Youtubers	Comedy Central
2016–2018	Late Motiv	#0, Movistar Plus+
2016–2017	Loco Mundo	#0, Movistar Plus+
2018–2024	La Resistencia	#0, Movistar Plus+
2024–present	La Revuelta	La 1
2024–2025	Campanadas de fin de año	La 1

=== Radio ===
Year	Title	Station
2008	No somos nadie	M80
2011	Hoy por Hoy	Cadena SER
2012	A vivir que son dos días	Cadena SER
2013–2015	YU: no te pierdas nada	Los 40
2014	La vida moderna	Cadena SER
2015–2016	Anda Ya	Los 40

== Controversy ==
On 1 July 2010 a controversy arose after he starred in a parody sketch on the programme UAU! in which he played a poor Paraguayan girl named Sunilda Estuardo who spoke about her life and urged Spain's national men's football team to let her country's team win in order to bring 'a little happiness to the poor children'. This occurred prior to the quarterfinal of the 2010 FIFA World Cup which took place two days later, between Paraguay and Spain.

'[...] I am now seven years old, and I have spent five of those working. I used to drive a crane, and now I collect the motors of old washing machines from a landfill. My coworkers —the ones who can talk— ask me, why have you been so happy lately, Sunilda? [...] This World Cup is the best thing Paraguay has done for us since I got a cold, and typhus, and measles, and malaria and ebola and everything else. Now the Spanish want to beat us, don't they already have enough? They came here to take our potatoes and our gold, and Hernán Cortés raped my great-grandmother, gentlemen! My family has had to sell our llama, and manatee and the square metre of coffee plantation, all to be able to buy me the Paraguayan football team's shirt. Spanish gentlemen, in the name of the children and the poor of Moctezuma, let Paraguay win the World Cup and bring a little joy to these fields on the outskirts of Madri... of Caacupé. Please do this, these chubby cheeks won't be around forever [...]'

At the end of the video, Broncano - as Pedro M. Estuardo - addressed the Spanish men's team, saying: 'the death of thousands of millions of Paraguayan girls is in your hands'.

The next day, Paraguay's Secretaría de la Niñez y de la Adolescencia (Secretary of childhood and adolescence) and various Paraguayan media organisations reacted with indignation, which led to the Spanish ambassador to Paraguay, Miguel Ángel Cortizo, publicly apologising.

== Personal life ==
Brocano's main comedic influences include the series Monty Python's Flying Circus and La hora chanante.

He was an amateur football player in his youth and is a fan of and plays a variety of sports, including tennis (his idol is Roger Federer), skiing and mountaineering.

Broncano is teetotal, something he has often discussed in interviews. When he and Lalachus presented TVE's New Year television coverage for 2025, they toasted the New Year with Champín, a non-alcoholic children's champagne.

Between 2018 and 2019, Brocano was in a relationship with actress Adriana Ugarte. Between 2020 and 2021, he dated tennis player Paula Badosa. Since 2021, he has been in a relationship with actress Silvia Alonso.

== Awards and nominations ==
- Premio Ondas for A vivir que son dos días, Cadena SER (2015)
- Comedian of the Year Award at the Festival de Televisión de Vitoria (2017)
- Premio Jaén Paraíso Interior (2017)
- Nomination for Best Host at the Iris Awards from the Academy of Television (2018)
- Premio Ondas for La vida moderna, Cadena SER (2018).
- Premio Ondas for La resistencia, #0 de Movistar + (2019).
- Best Host at the Premios Iris from the Academy of Television (2019)
- Festival de Televisión de Vitoria Award for La resistencia (2019).
- Joan Ramón Mainat Award from the Festival de Televisión de Vitoria for his professional career (2023).
