= Lalachus =

Spanish actress

- Born: Laura Yustres Vélez; 21 April 1990 (age 36); Fuenlabrada, Madrid, Spain
- Occupations: Comedian; Actress
- Years active: 2018–present
- Employer: RTVE
- Television: La revuelta

Laura Yustres Vélez (born 21 April 1990 in Fuenlabrada), better known by her stage name Lalachus or occasionally LaLaChus, is a Spanish TV comedian and actress.

== Career ==
After graduating in communications, she worked for a decade as a receptionist for a construction firm before entering the world of entertainment. She started her comedy career in 2018 with a show titled Riot Comedy, but came to greater prominence in 2020 with her social media content.

As an actress, in 2020 she played the role of tabloid journalist Lydia Lozano in the series Veneno about the life of TV personality La Veneno.

In 2022, she appeared on Tu cara me suena with her co-presenter Eva Soriano as Sonia & Selena.

In 2023, she appeared in the documentary Influencers: sobrevivir a las redes. She also became a regular collaborator on David Broncano's La Resistencia on #0.

In 2024, she followed Broncano to become a regular collaborator on his successful chat show La revuelta. On 5 December 2024, it was announced that she would present the Twelve Grapes on La 1 with Broncano. The show won the ratings battle between La 1 and Antena 3 with a convincing peak of 33.1%, though it was subject to controversy in more conservative circles when she held up a picture of Jesus with the head of the bull mascot of TVE game show El Grand Prix del verano photoshopped onto it.

== Filmography ==
=== Television ===
Year	Programme	Channel	Role
2020	Veneno	Atresplayer	Lydia Lozano
2020	Válidas	YouTube	Self
2021	Treintañeras a la deriva	YouTube	Self
2021	Sin novedad	HBO Max	Self
2022	Tu cara me suena	Antena 3	Contestant
2023	Influencers: Sobrevivir a las redes	Amazon Prime Video	Guest
2023–2024	The Resistance	#0 por Movistar Plus+	Collaborator
2024	Gran Prix del Verano	La 1	Fairy godmother (1 episode)
2024–present	La revuelta	La 1	Collaborator
2024–2025	Campanadas de fin de año	La 1	Co-presenter
2025–present	La vida breve	Movistar+	Self

=== Radio ===
Year	Programme	Network	Role
2022–present	Estirando el chicle	Podium Podcast	Self
2022–present	Cuerpos especiales	Europa FM	Self
