= New Year's Eve television broadcast in Spain =

Annual broadcast in Spain

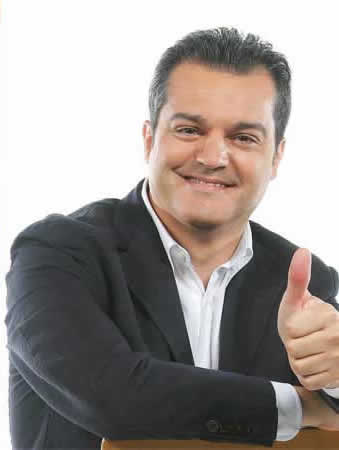
Ramón García, nicknamed "Ramontxu", hosted the New Year broadcast fifteen times on TVE, twice on Antena 3 and three times on social media.

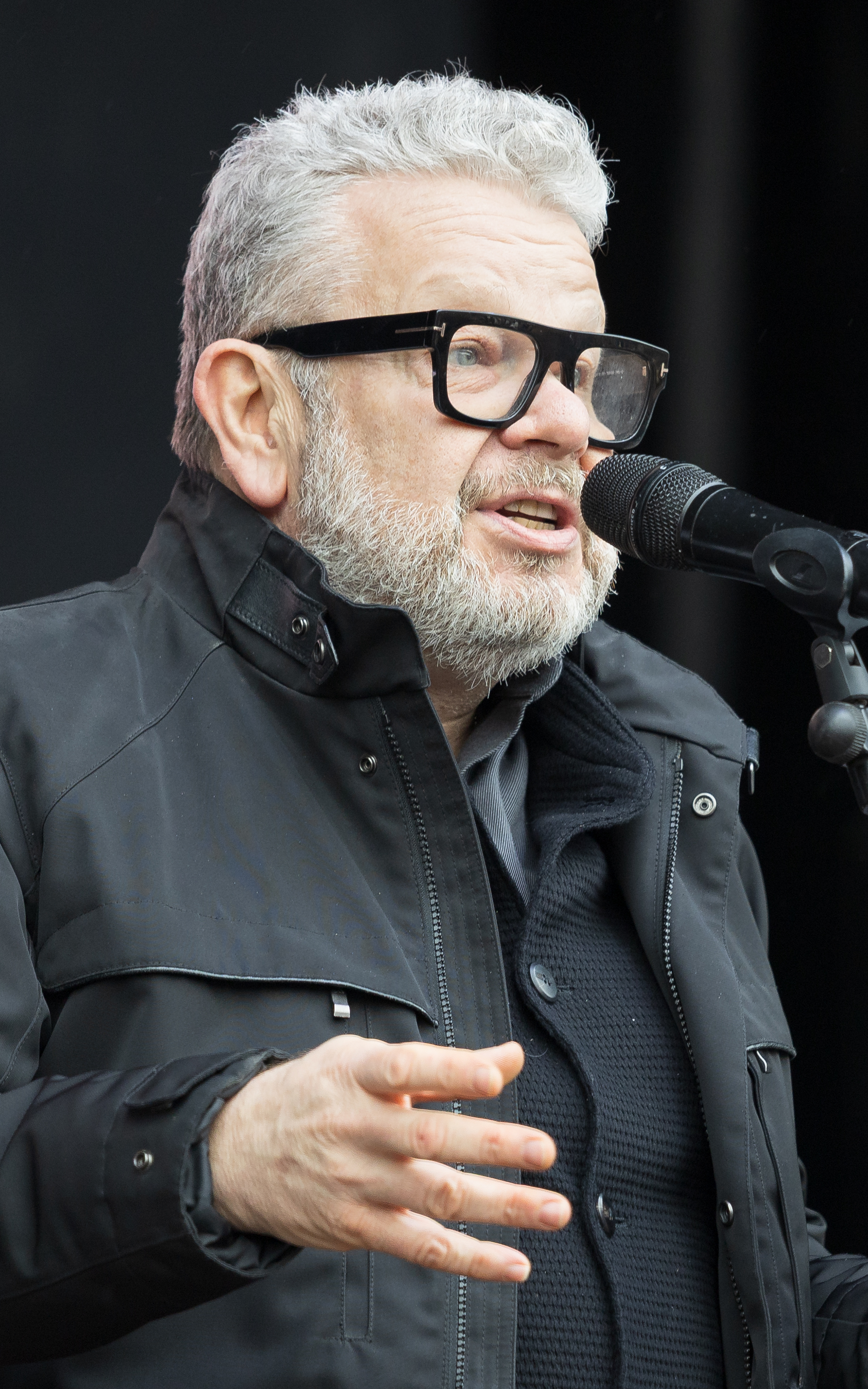
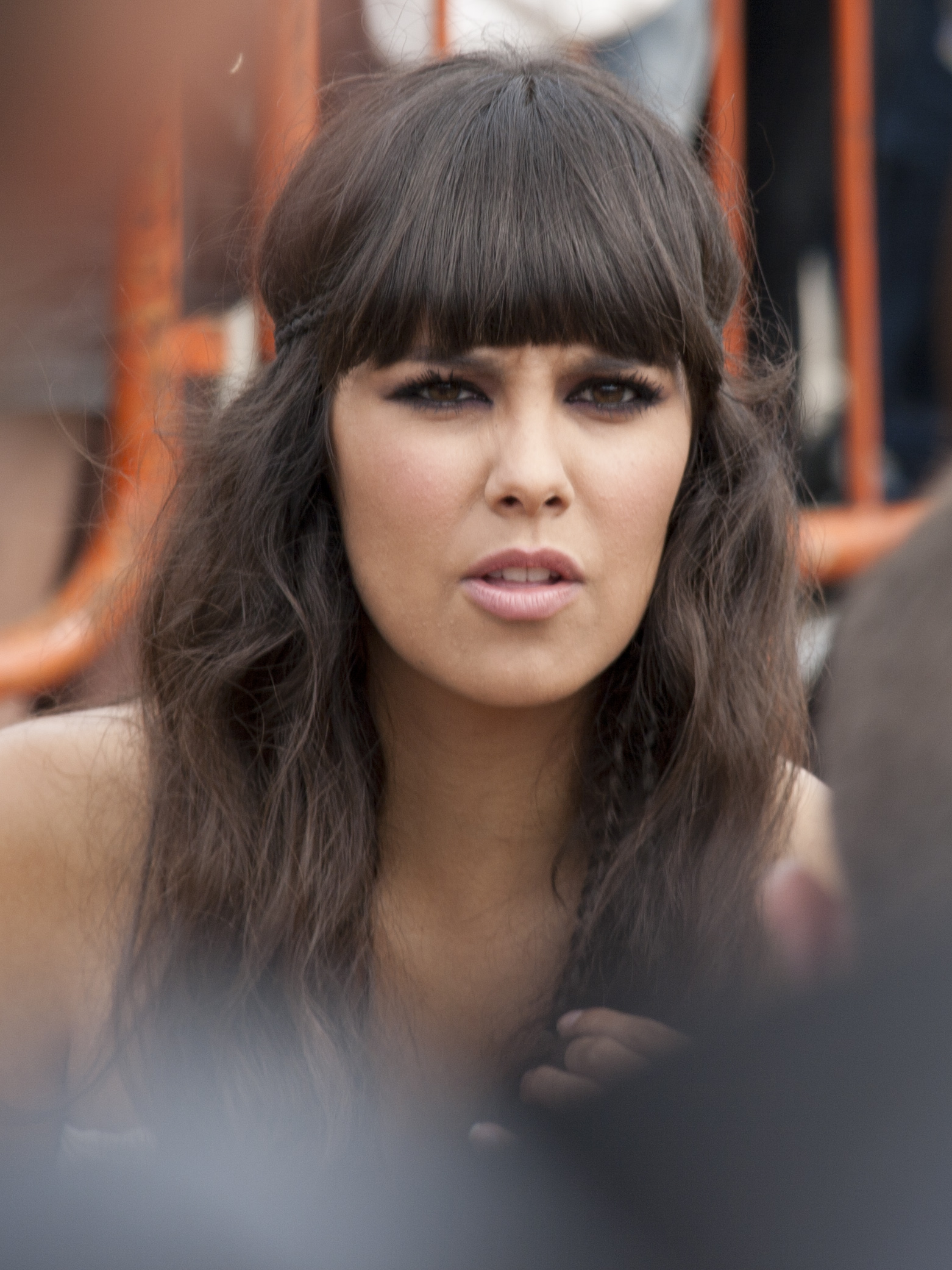
Cristina Pedroche (right, pictured 2011) and Alberto Chicote (left, pictured 2025) have hosted the bells on Antena 3 since 2015/16 and 2016/17 respectively.

Television broadcasting of the New Year bells (Spanish: campanadas de fin de año) with the Twelve Grapes started on Televisión Española for the 1961/62 broadcast, having previously been broadcast only on the radio.

The broadcast of the show is often a strong ratings battle between TVE and one of the private broadcasters, previously Telecinco but now Antena 3, which led the ratings from 2021/22 until 2023/24. To boost ratings, it is common for broadcasters to wheel out their most popular hosts. The celebrations are usually broadcast from the Puerta del Sol in Madrid, save for 1972/73 when the broadcast was from Barcelona instead.

La 1, La 2, Antena 3, LaSexta and Telemadrid will usually cover the celebrations in Madrid. Cuatro and Telecinco occasionally cover the fireworks from the capital, but often go to a different city around Spain instead. Since 2025/26, LaSexta has ceased producing its own broadcast and simulcasts Antena 3's coverage. Neox runs a satirical piece of coverage the day before called Feliz Año Neox, which often satirises the seriousness with which broadcast networks treat the celebrations.

TV channels usually broadcast from the Number 11 building, commonly known as Tío Pepe for the large advertising sign on its roof, directly opposite the Royal House of the Post Office, with the clock, which is the focal point of celebrations.

The 2025/26 bells were won by La 1 with Chenoa and Estopa, which improved on the previous year's performance with 5,823,000 viewers (36.3%). Antena 3 and LaSexta's simulacast was second place with 3,871,000 viewers (24.1%), a notable drop from the previous year.

== Process ==
The transmission of the bells usually starts at 23:40 - on Antena 3 and Telecinco taking over from a New Year's music show beforehand - and presenters will fill the time with light entertainment.

At 23:59:32, a ball will drop while a carillon sounds. After that, at 23:49:42, four cycles of two bells sound (in Spanish referred to as the cuartos, "fourths"). It is relatively common for the presenter of the broadcast to remind the audience that the cuartos are not part of the New Year bells and do not herald the arrival of the new year. There is an interval of four seconds in between each.

After the final cuarto, there is a 4-second pause before the twelve bells sound, with one grape being eaten for each. Most channels will load comedy graphics for each one relating to their sponsor, which usually changes once the twelve bells are complete to reveal "Feliz año ?+ year".

An experiment in 2017/18, following an agreement between the Autonomous Communities of Madrid and the Canary Islands saw the broadcast done twice from the Puerta del Sol for the first time, as the Canary Islands are one hour behind mainland Spain, using the Canary Islands' time zone. Since 1983/84, broadcasters had done an extra programme for the Canaries, however this was the first time that the Canary Islands' time zone was represented on the mainland. Since 2018/19, the traditional method has been used.

Until 1990/91, the commentary on TVE had been done by voiceover only, including by Matías Prats Cañete for many years. Antena 3's test transmission in 1989/90 saw Mayra Gómez Kemp become the first presenter to host the bells in vision. TVE followed suit from 1990/91, with comedy duo Martes y Trece being the first to run the show on TVE, and Laura Valenzuela being the first to do so on Telecinco.

Carmen Sevilla and Carlos Sobera are the only TV personalities to have hosted the bells on all three major networks. Since Cuatro now simulcasts Telecinco's coverage, Sobera is the only one to have hosted them on four different channels.

=== Controversies and errors ===
TVE's coverage for 1989/90 was notable for co-host Marisa Naranjo confusing the cuartos for the bells. This is not exclusive to TVE, with Antena 3 host Irma Soriano making the same mistake in 1993/94.

In 1996/97: the bells' interval was removed after renovation works had taken place on the Post Office building. Clockmaker Vicente Rodríguez confirmed on TV networks that he would put weights on the levers to force a three-second interval. However, the architect for the Madrid Agriculture and Living Ministry architect, Juan Blasco, overruled him for fear of causing further damage to the clock. This meant that the bells were complete in just 17 seconds.

Telecinco's coverage in 2002/03 caused a notable stir: the novel idea was to use twelve boats off the coast of Galicia in the formation of a clock, one lighting up for each stroke. However, strong winds on the night meant that the boats could not go out. Producers resolved to broadcast the previous night's dress rehearsal, and the fact that the bells were pre-recorded was made obvious as Telecinco's broadcast rang in 2003 a few seconds before the other channels'.

== Locations for Telecinco ==
Out	In	Place
1990	1991	Puerta del Sol, Madrid
1991	1992	Puerta del Sol, Madrid
1992	1993	Puerta del Sol, Madrid
1993	1994	Puerta del Sol, Madrid
1994	1995	Puerta del Sol, Madrid
1997	1998	Granada, Andalusia
1999	2000	Puerta del Sol, Madrid
2000	2001	Córdoba, Andalusia
2001	2002	Ronda, Andalusia
2002	2003	Muxía, A Coruña, Galicia
2003	2004	Barcelona
2004	2005	Consuegra, Castilla–La Mancha
2005	2006	Oviedo, Asturias
2006	2007	Valencia
2007	2008	Zaragoza
2008	2009	Puerta del Sol, Madrid
2009	2010	Puerta del Sol, Madrid
2010	2011	Puerta del Sol, Madrid
2011	2012	Puerta del Sol, Madrid
2012	2013	Puerta del Sol, Madrid
2013	2014	Puerta del Sol, Madrid
2014	2015	Puerta del Sol, Madrid
2015	2016	Puerta del Sol, Madrid
2016	2017	Puerta del Sol, Madrid
2017	2018	Puerta del Sol, Madrid
2018	2019	Sant Llorenç des Cardassar, Balearic Islands
2019	2020	Cáceres, Extremadura
2020	2021	Gran Canaria, Canary Islands
2021	2022	Vejer de la Frontera, Cádiz, Andalusia
2022	2023	Torrejón de Ardoz, Madrid
2023	2024	Seville, Andalusia
2024	2025	Castillo de San José, Lanzarote, Canary Islands
2025	2026	Formigal Ski Resort, Aragon

== Presenters by year ==
Year		TVE		Antena 3		LaSexta		Cuatro		Telecinco	
1989	1990	Marisa Naranjo		Mayra Gómez Kemp		N/A		N/A		N/A	
1990	1991	Martes y Trece		Minerva Piquero		N/A		N/A		Laura Valenzuela	
1991	1992	Javier Sardà	"El señor Casamajor"	Consuelo Berlanga		N/A		N/A		Laura Valenzuela	
1992	1993	Joaquín Prat		José María Carrascal		N/A		N/A		Jesús Puente	
1993	1994	José Mota	Juan Muñoz	Irma Soriano		N/A		N/A		José María Íñigo	Carmen Sevilla
1994	1995	Joaquín Prat	Ana Obregón	Pepe Carrol	Chiquito de la Calzada	N/A		N/A		José María Íñigo	
1995	1996	Ramón García	Ana Obregón	Matías Prats Cañete		N/A		N/A		Dani Delacámara	María José Sáez
1996	1997	Concha Galán	Bermúdez	Rody Aragón	Raphael	N/A		N/A		Carlos Lozano	María José Sáez
1997	1998	Ramón García	Raffaella Carrà	Constantino Romero	Concha Velasco	N/A		N/A		Sergio Pazos	Teté Delgado
1998	1999	Ramón García	Carmen Maura	Pedro Rollán	Carmen Sevilla	N/A		N/A		Paula Vázquez	
1999	2000	Ramón García	Nuria Roca	Pedro Rollán	Ana Obregón	N/A		N/A		Florentino Fernández	Paula Vázquez
2000	2001	Ramón García	Paloma Lago	Constantino Romero	Mar Saura	N/A		N/A		Félix Álvarez	Mariona Xuclá
2001	2002	Ramón García	Paloma Lago	Manu Carreño	Mar Saura	N/A		N/A		Fernando Acaso	Maribel Casany
2002	2003	Ramón García	Paloma Lago	Antonio Hidalgo		N/A		N/A		Mercedes Milá	Carlos Núñez
2003	2004	Ramón García	Carmen Sevilla	Characters from Aquí no hay quien viva		N/A		N/A		Manel Fuentes	Carolina Ferre
2004	2005	Ramón García	Ana Obregón	Characters from Aquí no hay quien viva		N/A		N/A		Jordi González	Carmen Alcayde
2005	2006	Ramón García	Anne Igartiburu	Characters from Aquí no hay quien viva		N/A		Eva Hache	George W. Bush (as puppet)	Antonio Lobato	Carmen Alcayde
2006	2007	Ramón García	Anne Igartiburu	Jorge Fernández	Mónica Martínez	Patricia Conde	Ángel Martín	Pablo Motos		Characters from Yo soy Bea	
2007	2008	Antonio Garrido	Anne Igartiburu	Ramón García	Anabel Alonso	Patricia Conde	Ángel Martín	Boris Izaguirre	Ana García-Siñeriz	Characters from Escenas de Matrimonio	
2008	2009	Carlos Sobera	Anne Igartiburu	Ramón García	Kira Miró	Berto Romero	Andreu Buenafuente	Rafael Méndez	Paula Vázquez	Christian Gálvez	María Castro
2009	2010	Manuel Bandera	Anne Igartiburu	Antonio Garrido	Patricia Montero	Berto Romero	Ana Morgade	Manu Carreño	Manolo Lama	Jorge Javier Vázquez	Belén Esteban
2010	2011	José Mota	Anne Igartiburu	Jorge Fernández	Sandra Daviú	Berto Romero	Ana Morgade	Dani Martínez	Anna Simon	Pilar Rubio	Marta Fernández
2011	2012	José Mota	Anne Igartiburu	Carlos Sobera	Carolina Cerezuela	El Gran Wyoming	Usun Yoon	From 2011/12, Mediaset and Cuatro broadcast the same bells on all channels			
2011	2012	José Mota	Anne Igartiburu	Carlos Sobera	Carolina Cerezuela	El Gran Wyoming	Usun Yoon	Jorge Javier Vázquez; Kiko Rivera; Isabel Pantoja			
2012	2013	Imanol Arias	Anne Igartiburu	Carlos Sobera	Paula Vázquez	Alberto Chicote	Sandra Sabatés	Characters from La que se avecina			
2013	2014	Jordi Cruz	Anne Igartiburu	Anna Simon	Paula Vázquez	Frank Blanco	Sandra Sabatés	Characters from Aída			
2014	2015	Ramón García	Anne Igartiburu	Anna Simon	Carlos Sobera	Frank Blanco	Cristina Pedroche	Characters from Chiringuito de Pepe			
2015	2016	Ramón García	Anne Igartiburu	Cristina Pedroche	Carlos Sobera	Alberto Chicote	Andrea Ropero	Marta Torné		Cristina Rodríguez	
2016	2017	Jordi Cruz	Anne Igartiburu	Cristina Pedroche	Alberto Chicote	Frank Blanco	Irene Junquera	Carlos Sobera		Lara Álvarez	
2017	2018	Ramón García	Anne Igartiburu	Cristina Pedroche	Alberto Chicote	Iñaki López	Cristina Pardo	Jesús Calleja		Lara Álvarez	
2018	2019	Roberto Leal	Anne Igartiburu	Cristina Pedroche	Alberto Chicote	Same broadcast as Antena 3		Jesús Calleja		Lara Álvarez	
2019	2020	Roberto Leal	Anne Igartiburu	Cristina Pedroche	Alberto Chicote	Iñaki López	Cristina Pardo	Jesús Vázquez		Paz Padilla	
2020	2021	Ana Obregón	Anne Igartiburu	Cristina Pedroche	Alberto Chicote	Iñaki López	Cristina Pardo	Christian Gálvez		Sandra Barneda	
2021	2022	Jacob Petrus	Anne Igartiburu	Cristina Pedroche	Alberto Chicote	Dani Mateo	Cristina Pardo	Carlos Sobera		Paz Padilla	
2022	2023	Ana Obregón	Los Morancos	Cristina Pedroche	Alberto Chicote	Dani Mateo	Cristina Pardo	Risto Mejide		Mariló Montero	
2023	2024	Ramón García	Ana Mena	Cristina Pedroche	Alberto Chicote	Dani Mateo	Cristina Pardo	No broadcast on Cuatro		Jesús Calleja	Marta Flich
2024	2025	David Broncano	Lalachus	Cristina Pedroche	Alberto Chicote	Dani Mateo	Cristina Pardo	Ion Aramendi		Blanca Romero	
2025	2026	Chenoa^{1}	Estopa^{2}	Cristina Pedroche	Alberto Chicote	Same broadcast as Antena 3		Sandra Barneda		Xuso Jones	

== By personality ==
TVE

Antena 3

Telecinco

Cuatro (simulcast Telecinco since 2011/12)

LaSexta (simulcast Antena 3 since 2025/26)

Autonomous community channel (only mentioned if star has done a national broadcast)

	90	91	92	93	94	95	96	97	98	99	00	01	02	03	04	05	06	07	08	09	10	11	12	13	14	15	16	17	18	19	20	21	22	23	24	25	26
Marisa Naranjo	TVE																																				
Mayra Gómez Kemp	A3																																				
Martes y Trece		TVE																																			
Minerva Piquero		A3																																			
Laura Valenzuela		T5	T5																																		
Javier Sardà			TVE																																		
Consuelo Berlanga			A3																																		
Joaquín Prat				TVE		TVE																															
José María Carrascal				A3																																	
Jesús Puente				T5																																	
José Mota					TVE																	TVE	TVE														
Irma Soriano					A3																																
Carmen Sevilla					T5					A3					TVE																						
José María Íñigo					T5	T5																															
Ana Obregón						TVE	TVE				A3					TVE																TVE		TVE			
Pepe Carrol						A3																															
Chiquito de la Calzada						A3																															
Ramón García							TVE		TVE	TVE	TVE	TVE	TVE	TVE	TVE	TVE	TVE	TVE	A3	A3						TVE	TVE		TVE						TVE		
Matías Prats Cañete						Andalusia	A3																														
Dani Declámara							T5																														
María José Sáez							T5	T5																													
Concha Galán								TVE																													
Bermúdez								TVE																													
Rody Aragón								A3																													
Raphael								A3																													
Carlos Lozano								T5		Madrid									Madrid																		
Raffaella Carrà									TVE																												
Constantino Romero									A3			A3																									
Concha Velasco									A3																												
Sergio Pazos									T5																												
Teté Delgado									T5																												
Carmen Maura										TVE																											
Pedro Rollán										A3	A3																										
Paula Vázquez										T5	T5									Cuatro				A3	A3												
Nuria Roca											TVE					Valencia																					
Florentino Fernández											T5											Cuatro															
Paloma Lago												TVE	TVE	TVE																							
Mar Saura												A3	A3	A3																							
Félix Álvarez												T5																									
Mariona Xuclá												T5																									
Manu Carreño													A3																								
Mónica Martínez													A3					A3																		Madrid	Madrid
Fernando Acaso													T5																								
Maribel Casany													T5																								
Ricardo Gómez														TVE																							
Antonio Hidalgo														A3																							
Mercedes Milá														T5																							
María Adánez															A3																						
José Luis Gil															A3																						
Fernando Tejero															A3																						
Manel Fuentes															T5																						
Carolina Ferre															T5																						
Eduardo Gómez																A3	A3																				
Malena Alterio																A3																					
Luis Merlo																A3																					
Jordi González																T5																					
Carmen Alcayde																T5	T5																				
Anne Igartiburu									Basque	Basque							TVE	TVE	TVE	TVE	TVE	TVE	TVE	TVE	TVE	TVE	TVE	TVE	TVE	TVE	TVE	TVE	TVE				
Eduardo García Martínez																	A3																				
Vanesa Romero																	A3																				
Eva Hache																	Cuatro																				
Antonio Lobato																	T5																				
Jorge Fernández													Basque		Basque			A3				A3															
Pablo Motos																		Cuatro																			
Ruth Núñez																		T5																			
Alejandro Tous																		T5																			
Norma Ruiz																		T5																			
Patricia Conde																		LaSexta	LaSexta																		
Ángel Martín																		LaSexta	LaSexta																		
Antonio Garrido																			TVE		A3																
Anabel Alonso																			A3																		
Boris Izaguirre																			Cuatro																		
Ana García-Siñeriz																			Cuatro																		
David Venancio Muro																			T5																		
Soledad Mallol																			T5																		
Carlos Sobera																				TVE			A3	A3		A3	A3	Cuatro					Cuatro				
Carlos Sobera																				TVE			A3	A3		A3	A3	T5					T5				
Rafa Méndez																				Cuatro																	
Christian Gálvez																				T5												Cuatro					
Christian Gálvez																				T5												T5					
María Castro																				T5																	
Andreu Buenafuente																				LaSexta																	
Berto Romero																				LaSexta	LaSexta	LaSexta															
Manuel Bandera																					TVE																
Patricia Montero																					A3																
Manolo Lama																					Cuatro																
Manu Carreño																					Cuatro																
Jorge Javier Vázquez																					T5		T5														
Belén Esteban																					T5																
Ana Morgade																					LaSexta	LaSexta															
Sandra Daviú																						A3															
Anna Simon																						Cuatro			A3	A3											
Dani Martínez																						Cuatro															
Pilar Rubio																						T5															
Marta Fernández Vázquez																						T5															
Sara Carbonero																						T5															
Carolina Cerezuela																							A3														
Kiko Rivera																							T5														
Isabel Pantoja																							T5														
El Gran Wyoming																							LaSexta														
Usun Yoon																							LaSexta														
Imanol Arias																								TVE													
Jordi Sánchez													Catalonia											Cuatro													
Jordi Sánchez													Catalonia											T5													
Pablo Chiapella																								Cuatro													
Pablo Chiapella																								T5													
Vanesa Romero																								Cuatro													
Vanesa Romero																								T5													
Alberto Chicote																								LaSexta			LaSexta	A3	A3	A3	A3	A3	A3	A3	A3	A3	A3
Alberto Chicote																								LaSexta			LaSexta	A3	A3	LaSexta	A3	A3	A3	A3	A3	A3	LaSexta
Sandra Sabatés																								LaSexta	LaSexta												
Jordi Cruz																									TVE			TVE									
Pepe Rodríguez																									TVE			TVE									
Paco León																									Cuatro												
Paco León																									T5												
Miren Ibarguren																									Cuatro												
Miren Ibarguren																									T5												
Pepe Viyuela																									Cuatro												
Pepe Viyuela																									T5												
Canco Rodríguez																									Cuatro												
Canco Rodríguez																									T5												
Frank Blanco																									LaSexta	LaSexta		LaSexta									
Jesús Bonilla																										Cuatro											
Jesús Bonilla																										T5											
Dafne Fernández																										Cuatro											
Dafne Fernández																										T5											
Adrián Rodríguez																										Cuatro											
Adrián Rodríguez																										T5											
El Langui																										Cuatro											
El Langui																										T5											
Cristina Pedroche																										LaSexta	A3	A3	A3	A3	A3	A3	A3	A3	A3	A3	A3
Cristina Pedroche																										LaSexta	A3	A3	A3	LaSexta	A3	A3	A3	A3	A3	A3	LaSexta
Marta Torné																											Cuatro										
Marta Torné																											T5										
Cristina Rodríguez																											Cuatro										
Cristina Rodríguez																											T5										
Pelayo Díaz																											Cuatro										
Pelayo Díaz																											T5										
Natalia Ferviú																											Cuatro										
Natalia Ferviú																											T5										
Andrea Ropero																											LaSexta										
Lara Álvarez																												Cuatro		Cuatro							
Lara Álvarez																												T5		T5							
Irene Junquera																												LaSexta									
Lydia Lozano																													Cuatro								
Lydia Lozano																													T5								
Kiko Hernández																													Cuatro								
Kiko Hernández																													T5								
Terelu Campos																													Cuatro								
Terelu Campos																													T5								
María Patiño																													Cuatro								
María Patiño																													T5								
Mila Ximénez																													Cuatro								
Mila Ximénez																													T5								
Iñaki López																													LaSexta		LaSexta	LaSexta					
Cristina Pardo																													LaSexta		LaSexta	LaSexta	LaSexta	LaSexta	LaSexta	LaSexta	
Roberto Leal																														TVE	TVE						
Jesús Calleja																														Cuatro					T5		
Jesús Calleja																														T5					T5		
Jesús Vázquez																															Cuatro						
Jesús Vázquez																															T5						
Paz Padilla								Andalusia																							Cuatro		Cuatro				
Paz Padilla								Andalusia																							T5		T5				
Sandra Barneda																																Cuatro					Cuatro
Sandra Barneda																																T5					T5
Jacob Petrus																																	TVE				
Los Morancos																																		TVE			
Risto Mejide																																		Cuatro			
Risto Mejide																																		T5			
Mariló Montero																																		Cuatro			
Mariló Montero																																		T5			
Ana Mena																																			TVE		
Jenni Hermoso																																			TVE		
Marta Flich																																			T5		
David Broncano																																				TVE	
Lalachus																																				TVE	
Ion Aramendi																																				Cuatro	
Ion Aramendi																																				T5	
Blanca Romero																																				Cuatro	
Blanca Romero																																				T5	
Chenoa																											Catalonia										TVE
Estopa																																					TVE
Santiago Segura																																					A3
Santiago Segura																																					LaSexta
Xuso Jones																																Murcia	Murcia	Murcia			Cuatro
Xuso Jones																																Murcia	Murcia	Murcia			T5

== Ratings ==
Ratings by channel
Year	La 1		La 2		Antena 3		Cuatro		Telecinco		LaSexta	
Year	Viewers	Share	Viewers	Share	Viewers	Share	Viewers	Share	Viewers	Share	Viewers	Share
1990	9,400,000	???	N/A		N/A		N/A		N/A		N/A	
1991	8,605,000	49.6%	N/A		N/A		N/A		N/A		N/A	
1992	9,335,000	62.6%	N/A		N/A		N/A		N/A		N/A	
1993	8,118,000	53.0%	176,000	1.1%	N/A		N/A		3,669,000	24.0%	N/A	
1994	7,996,000	48.5%	338,000	2.4%	3,628,000	22.1%	N/A		3,233,000	21.0%	N/A	
1995	8,564,000	54.7%	267,000	1.7%	3,577,000	19.7%	N/A		2,400,000	14.4%	N/A	
1996	9,797,000	61.6%	392,000	2.5%	3,289,000	21.5%	N/A		1,352,000	8.6%	N/A	
1997	9,350,000	59.0%	318,000	2.0%	2,847,000	15.7%	N/A		950,000	6.0%	N/A	
1998	9,747,000	61.6%	428,000	2.7%	2,074,000	13.1%	N/A		740,000	4.7%	N/A	
1999	8,881,000	58.0%	N/A		1,685,000	11.0%	N/A		1,719,000	11.2%	N/A	
2000	10,238,000	66.9%	106,000	0.7%	1,356,000	8.9%	N/A		1,351,000	8.8%	N/A	
2001	9,988,000	66.0%	334,000	2.3%	1,458,000	9.6%	N/A		643,000	4.3%	N/A	
2002	10,550,000	71.6%	400,000	2.8%	778,000	5.3%	N/A		452,000	3.1%	N/A	
2003	8,824,000	63.6%	368,000	2.7%	746,000	5.4%	N/A		1,735,000	12.5%	N/A	
2004	8,223,000	60.1%	377,000	3.4%	1,545,000	11.3%	N/A		876,000	6.4%	N/A	
2005	7,497,000	53.7%	244,000	1.8%	2,642,000	18.9%	N/A		1,018,000	7.3%	N/A	
2006	8,209,000	57.9%	491,000	3.5%	1,710,000	12.1%	456,000	3.2%	925,000	6.5%	N/A	
2007	7,592,000	56.6%	346,000	2.6%	873,000	6.5%	545,000	4.1%	1,567,000	11.7%	219,000	1.6%
2008	6,838,000	47.3%	344,000	2.4%	2,452,000	17.0%	364,000	2.5%	1,343,000	9.3%	396,000	2.7%
2009	7,162,000	49.0%	534,000	3.7%	1,617,000	11.1%	755,000	5.2%	1,275,000	8.7%	466,000	3.2%
2010	7,247,000	50.8%	473,000	3.3%	421,000	3.0%	181,000	1.3%	3,025,000	21.2%	283,000	2.0%
