= Cristina Pedroche =

Spanish TV host and reporter

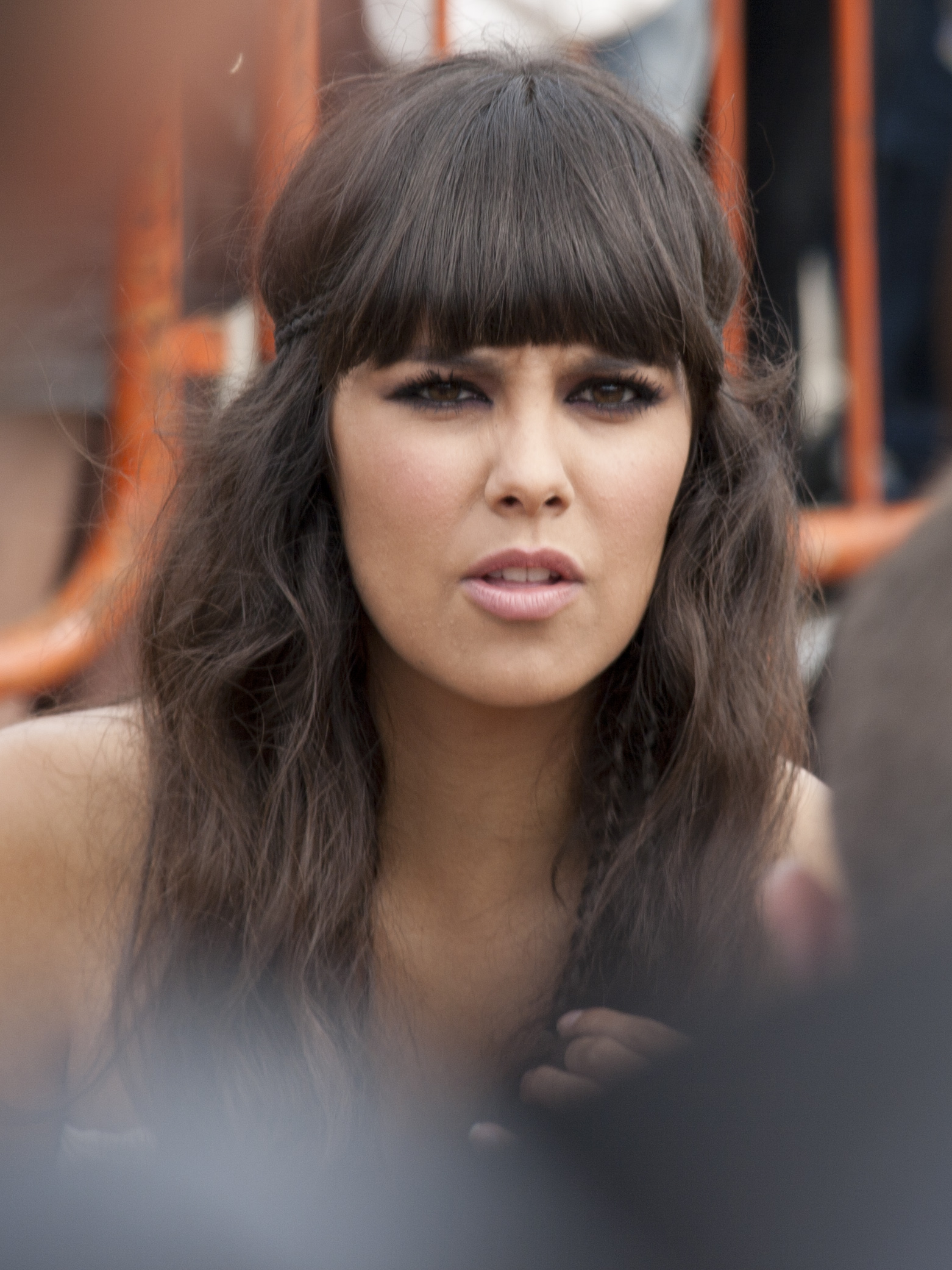
- Cristina Pedroche in 2011
- Born: Cristina Pedroche Navas; 30 October 1988 (age 37); Madrid, Spain
- Education: King Juan Carlos University
- Occupations: Actress; Reporter; TV presenter
- Years active: 2009–present
- Television: Sé lo que hicistéis... (2010–2011); Pekín Express (2015–2016); Antena 3 Campanadas (2015–present); Password (2023)
- Height: 5 ft 5 in (1.65 m)
- Spouse: David Muñoz (m. 2015)
- Children: 2

Cristina Pedroche Navas (born 30 October 1988) is a Spanish actress, reporter and TV presenter.

== Biography ==
Pedroche was born in Madrid on 30 October 1988. For a while she combined her studies in Business Administration and Management and Tourism at King Juan Carlos University with her work on television as a reporter. She rose to fame in 2010 when she joined the daily comedy show Sé lo que hicisteis... on LaSexta as a TV reporter until 2011. From August 2011 to June 2012 she worked as a reporter in the daily comedy show Otra movida. In March 2010, she was on the cover of the Spanish FHM magazine.

In September 2012, she joined radio program Yu, no te pierdas nada as a collaborator, on Los 40. In December 2013, she joined the daily TV comedy show Zapeando, hosted by Frank Blanco on LaSexta. In April 2014, Pedroche participated in the 'water war' segment of the show with Frank Blanco. Pedroche also used the show as a platform to raise awareness for ALS by participating in the Ice Bucket Challenge.

In December 2014, it was announced that she had signed a golden handcuffs contract with Atresmedia, owners of LaSexta. She also hosted the 2014-2015 New Year's Eve's Twelve Grapes broadcast for LaSexta alongside Frank Blanco, wearing a much commented upon transparent dress. During this show she participated in a 'champagne war' with Frank Blanco, a new year play on the previous 'water war'. She also appeared on La que se avecina.

In 2015, she left Zapeando to join the fifth Spanish season of reality game show Pekín Express, her first work as a solo host.

On 24 October 2015 she married Spanish chef David Muñoz.

Pedroche moved to Antena 3 for the 2015/16 Twelve Grapes, hosting with Carlos Sobera and since 2016 with Alberto Chicote, repeating the stir caused by her dress. Pedroche's dress has since become an institution in its own right, being hidden until the night, and usually revealed right before the first bell to maximise ratings at midnight. She and Chicote led the night's ratings continuously from 2020/21 until 2023/24.

In 2017 she hosted the talent show Tú sí que sí on LaSexta. In April 2021, she was the host of Love Island España for one series, and was the host of the Spanish version of Password in 2023.

She was cast in Sin filtro, by Santiago Segura.

== Works ==
=== TV programs ===
Year	Program	Note
2021	Love Island España	Host
2015-2016	Pekín Express	Host
2015	Twelve Grapes 2015–2016 on Antena 3	Host
2014	Twelve Grapes 2014–2015 on La Sexta	Host
2014	Neox Fan Awards	Host
2014	Los viernes al show	Collaboration
2013–present	Zapeando	Collaboration
2011-2012	Otra movida	TV reporter
2010-2011	Sé lo que hicisteis...	TV reporter

=== TV series ===
Year	Series	Note
2014	Águila Roja	Juana Sánchez
2014	Aída	Marta
2014	La que se avecina	Flora
2012	La huida	With Luis Fernández
2012	Entre líneas	With Berta Collado and Jordi Mestre
2011	Okupados	Webseries. 1 episode Doctora Hierro
2009	Sin tetas no hay paraíso	One episode
2009	Yo soy Bea	One episode

=== Short films ===
Year	Film	Director
2010	Buzón de voz	Óscar Arenas and Carlos Caro
2009	Naturaleza muerta	Raúl Alfonso

=== Music videos ===
Year	Video	Note
2014	No lo merezco	With Camela, Alaska and Mario Vaquerizo
2012	Summer is Crazy	With DJ Valdi in Otra Movida
2012	Dos	With DJ Valdi in Otra Movida
2009	Sólo tú	With Sergio Vallín and Raquel del Rosario
2009	Canciones Tristes	With Noel Soto

=== Radio ===
Year	Program	Note
2012–2016	Yu: no te pierdas nada	With Dani Mateo in Los 40 Principales
2012–2016	Anda ya	In Los 40 Principales
