= La resistencia =

Spanish TV talk show

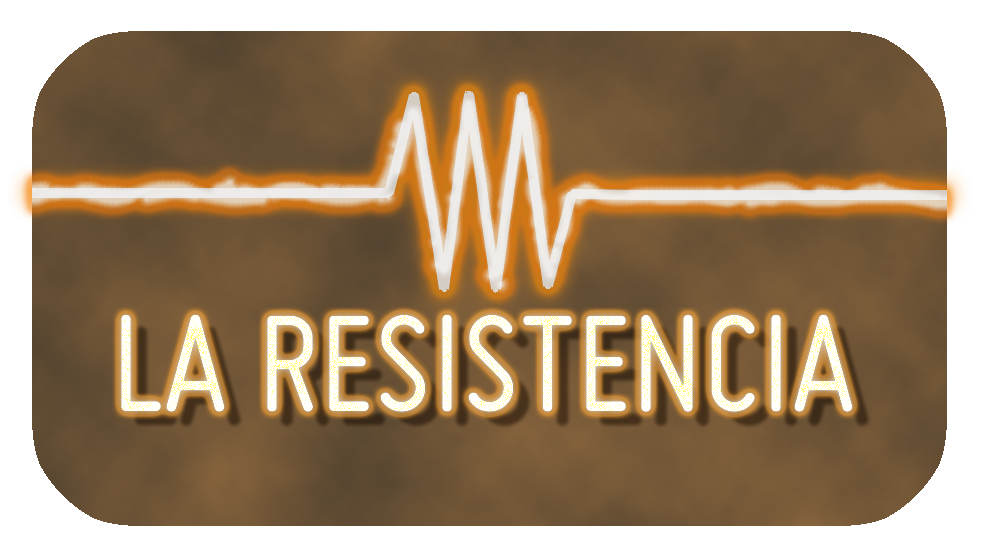
- Genre: Late-night talk show; Variety show
- Directed by: Ricardo Castella
- Presented by: David Broncano
- Starring: Ricardo Castella; Jorge Ponce; Marcos Martínez "Grison"
- Opening theme: "Hail to the Chief" by Prophets of Rage
- Original language: Spanish
- No. of seasons: 7
- No. of episodes: 1022

Production
- Production locations: Arlequín Theater, Madrid
- Running time: 50 minutes
- Production companies: El Terrat; Movistar+

Original release
- Network: #0
- Release: 1 February 2018 – 4 July 2024

Related
- Late Motiv; La revuelta

The Resistance (La Resistencia) is a Spanish TV talk show that is broadcast in #0 of Movistar +. Its first edition was on 1 February 2018, hosted by David Broncano broadcast from the Arlequín Theater in Madrid and is produced by El Terrat.

== History ==
Coinciding with the second anniversary of channel #0, David Broncano left his usual collaboration in the Late Motiv program and the Locomundo program to present the first late late show in Spain, following the format of some television channels in the United States of linking two nightly shows (in Spanish, the program of the end of the night) in a row. The program is broadcast from the Arlequín Theater, very close to Madrid's Gran Vía and with a live audience.

The irreverent interviews he does in this program have become, in many occasions, viral. The host personality has also helped him win the sympathy of a large audience. As a consequence, the TV show has had great success both on the Movistar+ channel and on the YouTube page.

The program is directed by Ricardo Castella, who also acts as a prompter. It has as collaborators with Dani Rovira, Antonio Resines, Ignatius Farray, Quequé, Jorge Ponce, Ernesto Sevilla or Rober Bodegas among others and in the first programs appeared youtuber Ter. Beatboxer Marcos Martínez «Grison» and Ricardo Castella perform the music live.

The song "Hail to the Chief" from the supergroup Prophets of Rage was chosen for the title sequence. In 2019, the show received the Ondas Award for Best Television Entertainment Program.

In 2024 the team was hired by La 1 and created a program that is basically a sequel of this one, La revuelta.

== Sections ==
- Previous show

Daily section that can only be seen by those attending the program at the Arlequín Theater, since it is not broadcast on the televised program. In this part, the audience is entertained with the performance of Jaime Caravaca, resident comedian and Grison Beatbox.

- Insults of the public

Daily section of the presenter David Broncano where he receives insults from the public through social networks and comments on them.

- Monologues

Daily and initial section presented by David Broncano in which he reviews current affairs in a humorous way, especially the most absurd and surreal news on the scene. Despite having a humorous and casual tone, its most critical side has also been applauded with some of the political and social situations of the moment.

- Interview

Program space in which David Broncano interviews a guest, a group or some formation. The guests tend to have a lesser presence in the media than those of other programs on the same network, which allows to discover characters that until now had carried out a few or any interviews. The star question that David Broncano always asks is "How much money do you have?", along with the question of "When was the last time you had sex?". Many guests respond and others prefer not to respond and keep the mystery.

The program has often been applauded because of the great visibility it gives to women's sports in the country by very often inviting athletes who do not have the opportunity to attend other programs to do their promotion.

- Who would you rather see dead?

Jorge Ponce shows two photographs of two different celebrities and asks the audience a question: who would you prefer see dead. He presents arguments in favor of each famous and finally it is the public who makes the decision; the most applauded is the one that they prefer to die. Santiago Segura, Joaquín Sabina or Andrés Iniesta are some of the celebrities who have starred in this section, and even Jesús de Nazaret and Barrabás appeared in an edition for Holy Week.

- Live connexions from the street

From outside the Arlequín Theater, on Madrid's Gran Vía, Jorge Ponce connects with the set and conducts brief interviews with pedestrians. The most frequent ones consist of judging passers-by their appearance and interviewing them based on the prejudices they generate. He also asks questions about a specific date or event. The connections until March were broadcast in near live, due to the change of time and daylight hours. Jorge Ponce discovered that they were recorded in the afternoon.

- Review of internet forums

Jorge Ponce investigates the most surreal forums on the internet, looking for the most original and strange answers from Internet users.

- Musical performance

Ignatius Farray, together with his friend José Luis Petróleo, form a group and perform a chaotic musical performance. Before singing, he presents and comments on the lyrics of the new song, written on a large cardboard. The themes are characterized by being surreal and having a repetitive chorus. During the performance Ignatius sings, his friend plays the guitar, David Broncano is in charge of playing the electronic drums and Grison also accompanies them on the electric guitar.

- Ins and outs

Ricardo Castella explains internal issues and anecdotes of the program, revealing some of the secrets related to the preparation of the program.

- The weather

Jorge Ponce analyzes the weather situation in a curious way using a free application for tablet.

- El "girito"

Jorge Ponce goes with a magnificent stove downtown asking people what they think about controversial issues, using a flute to identify the powerful question.

- The "Bad" anthill

Jorge Ponce parodies the best known sections of "The anthill" program, another Spanish TV show broadcast on Antena 3 channel.

== Occasional sections ==
- "Blockbuster" Comment

Dani Rovira appears as an occasional collaborator in this section where he talks about a blockbuster and makes a humorous summary of the film. He has commented on films such as The Lord of the Rings, Independence Day and The Bodyguard.

- Theatrical performance

Antonio Resines, as a friend of the program, makes this collaboration where with the help of the program team they do a small theatrical performance. There is no intention to make a formal performance, it emphasizes the little preparation, the low budget and the comedy.

- Surprise guest

Comedian Héctor de Miguel "Quequé" brings a guest to the show without the host knowing who he is and should try to find out through questions about who he is. The list of these guests stands out for being personalities or groups of which David Broncano has made jokes. This list is made up of Cafe Quijano, Juan Muñoz de Cruz y Raya, Macaco, Dani Martín and the music group Taburete.

- Program ideas

Comedians Rober Bodegas and Alberto Casado (Pantomima Full) bring original ideas for programs to sell on Movistar +. All these ideas are presented in a parodic and ironic way and usually these programs are very similar to other existing productions.

== Guests ==
=== First season ===
#	Season number	Date	Guest	Audience
1	1	1 February 2018	Antonio Resines	67.000 (0,7%)
2	2	5 February 2018	Itziar Castro	
3	3	6 February 2018	Ana Asensio	58.000 (0,6%)
4	4	7 February 2018	Afrojuice 195	
5	5	8 February 2018	Brisa Fenoy	
6	6	12 February 2018	Javier Santaolalla	56.000 (0,6%)
7	7	13 February 2018	Cristina Gutiérrez	
8	8	14 February 2018	Alejandro Cao de Benós	67.000 (0,7%)
9	9	15 February 2018	Ernesto Sevilla	
10	10	19 February 2018	Elvira Sastre	46.000 (0,4%)
11	11	20 February 2018	Regino Hernández	
12	12	21 February 2018	Adrián Mateos	75.000 (0,8%)
13	13	22 February 2018	Alberto Ammann and Clara Méndez-Leite	
14	14	26 February 2018	Venga Monjas	
15	15	27 February 2018	Zatu	
16	16	28 February 2018	Paul Urkijo and Eneko Sagardoy	
17	17	1 March 2018	Ibai Llanos	
18	18	5 March 2018	Texxcoco	57.000 (0,6%)
19	19	6 March 2018	Sandra Sánchez	80.000 (0,9%)
20	20	7 March 2018	María Barranco and Angy Fernández	62.000 (0,6%)
21	21	8 March 2018	Berto Romero	
22	22	12 March 2018	Rozalén	
23	23	13 March 2018	Ona Carbonell	
24	24	14 March 2018	David Sainz	
25	25	15 March 2018	Eric Jiménez	
26	26	19 March 2018	Ricardo Gómez and Irene Escolar	
27	27	20 March 2018	Javier García «Chino»	
28	28	21 March 2018	Miguel Noguera	
29	29	22 March 2018	Carla Cervantes and Sandra Egido	
30	30	2 April 2018	Loulogio and Outconsumer	
31	31	3 April 2018	Antonio Luque «Sr. Chinarro»	
32	32	4 April 2018	Mi Hoa Lee	
33	33	5 April 2018	IZAL	44.000 (0,4%)
34	34	9 April 2018	Andrew O'Neill	46.000 (0,5%)
35	35	10 April 2018	Quique Peinado and Manuel Burque	
36	36	11 April 2018	Natos and Waor	
37	37	12 April 2018	Yohanna Alonso	65.000 (0,7%)
38	38	16 April 2018	Ed is Dead	51.000 (0,5%)
39	39	17 April 2018	Ingrid García-Jonsson	
40	40	18 April 2018	Jordi ENP	
41	41	19 April 2018	Boa Mistura	
42	42	23 April 2018	C. Tangana	
43	43	24 April 2018	Alicia Sintes	51.000 (0,5%)
44	44	25 April 2018	Joaquín Reyes	
45	45	26 April 2018	José Javier Hombrados	37.000 (0,4%)
46	46	30 April 2018	Belén Cuesta	
47	47	2 May 2018	Juan Gómez-Jurado and Carla Suárez	
48	48	3 May 2018	Ingrid García-Jonsson	54.000 (0,6%)
49	49	7 May 2018	Lolito Fernández	
50	50	8 May 2018	Gorka Urbizu	51.000 (0,5%)
51	51	9 May 2018	Antoni Daimiel	
52	52	10 May 2018	Najwa Nimri	36.000 (0,4%)
53	53	14 May 2018	Borja Cobeaga	58.000 (0,6%)
54	54	15 May 2018	Belén López	42.000 (0,4%)
55	55	16 May 2018	Julen Lopetegui	
56	56	17 May 2018	Salvador Espín	44.000 (0,5%)
57	57	21 May 2018	Kiko Amat	
58	58	22 May 2018	Willy Hernangómez	
59	59	23 May 2018	Javiera Mena	
60	60	24 May 2018	Carlas Ballarta	
61	61	28 May 2018	Ayax and Prok and Ingrid García-Jonsson	
62	62	29 May 2018	Carolina Marín	
63	63	30 May 2018	Lucía Martiño	
64	64	31 May 2018	Raúl Cimas	49.000 (0,5%)
65	65	4 June 2018	Carmen Ruiz and Fernando Tejero	
66	66	5 June 2018	Nathy Peluso	
67	67	6 June 2018	Amaya Valdemoro	
68	68	7 June 2018	Nacho Vegas	
69	69	11 June 2018	Beatriz Rico	
70	70	12 June 2018	Vetusta Morla	52.000 (0,5%)
71	71	13 June 2018	Javier Cansado	
72	72	14 June 2018	Mara Torres	54.000 (0,5%)
73	73	18 June 2018	Leonor Watling	
74	74	19 June 2018	Andy y Lucas	66.000 (0,7%)
75	75	20 June 2018	Pol Espargaró	41.000 (0,5%)
76	76	21 June 2018	David Verdaguer and Óscar Machancoses	
77	77	25 June 2018	Residente	
78	78	26 June 2018	Becky G	42.000 (0,4%)
79	79	27 June 2018	Maggie Civantos	
80	80	28 June 2018	Ingrid García-Jonsson	
81	81	2 July 2018	Amarna Miller	39.000 (0,4%)
82	82	3 July 2018	Paco Arévalo	64.000 (0,7%)
83	83	4 July 2018	Viki Gómez	61.000 (0,7%)
84	84	5 July 2018	Javier Coronas and Yung Beef	49.000 (0,5%)

=== Second season ===
Program	Season program	Date	Guest	Audience
85	1	10 September 2018	Kiko Veneno	46.000 (0,6%)
86	2	11 September 2018	Carmen Blanco	60.000 (0,8%)
87	3	12 September 2018	Gisela Pulido	62.000 (0,7%)
88	4	13 September 2018	Joaquín Reyes and Ernesto Sevilla	76.000 (0,9%)
89	5	17 September 2018	Marta Torné	
90	6	18 September 2018	Los Punsetes	
91	7	19 September 2018	Adam Ondra	
92	8	20 September 2018	Rebeca Haro	54.000 (0,6%)
93	9	24 September 2018	Nacho Carretero	50.000 (0,7%)
94	10	25 September 2018	Joana Pastrana and Ingrid García-Jonsson	61.000 (0,7%)
95	11	26 September 2018	Daniel Antón	
96	12	27 September 2018	Gaizka Mendieta	
97	13	1 October 2018	Maribel Verdú, Juana Acosta and Paula Echevarría	43.000 (0,5%)
98	14	2 October 2018	Jorge Prado and Ana Carrasco	
99	15	3 October 2018	Joe Crepúsculo	
100	16	4 October 2018	Iggy Rubín, Antonio Castelo and Jorge Ponce	
101	17	8 October 2018	Adriana Torrebejano	
102	18	9 October 2018	Fermín Muguruza	
103	19	10 October 2018	Ocelote	
104	20	11 October 2018	Facu Díaz and Miguel Maldonado	38.000 (0,4%)
105	21	15 October 2018	María Guerra and Pepa Blanes	53.000 (0,6%)
106	22	16 October 2018	Wismichu	41.000 (0,5%)
107	23	17 October 2018	Darío Adanti and Edu Galán	
108	24	18 October 2018	Hinds	63.000 (0,7%)
109	25	22 October 2018	Ester Expósito	
110	26	23 October 2018	Dani Martín	53.000 (0,6%)
111	27	24 October 2018	Jordi Évole	47.000 (0,5%)
112	28	25 October 2018	Albert Pla	46.000 (0,6%)
113	29	29 October 2018	Javier Rey	
114	30	30 October 2018	Natalia Valdebenito	
115	31	31 October 2018	Raúl Pérez and Café Quijano	46.000 (0,5%)
116	32	5 November 2018	Toundra	
117	33	6 November 2018	Laia Palau	55.000 (0,6%)
118	34	7 November 2018	Carlos Librado	
119	35	8 November 2018	Isabel Coixet	
120	36	12 November 2018	Marzenna Adamczyk	77.000 (0,8%)
121	37	13 November 2018	Macarena Gómez	73.000 (0,8%)
122	38	14 November 2018	Bejo	
123	39	15 November 2018	Robe Iniesta	
124	40	19 November 2018	Álex O'Dogherty and Frank Spano	
125	41	20 November 2018	Iñaki Gabilondo	
126	42	21 November 2018	Bad Gyal	48.000 (0,5%)
127	43	22 November 2018	Antonio de la Torre	41.000 (0,4%)
128	44	26 November 2018	TheGrefg	48.000 (0,6%)
129	45	27 November 2018	Elena López	
130	46	28 November 2018	Carolina Durante	
131	47	29 November 2018	Adriana Ugarte	48.000 (0,5%)
132	48	3 December 2018	Sergio Llull	
133	49	4 December 2018	Aymar Navarro	
134	50	5 December 2018	John Petrucci and James LaBrie (Dream Theater)	
135	51	10 December 2018	Blanca Suárez	60.000 (0,7%)
136	52	11 December 2018	Laura Pausini	61.000 (0,7%)
137	53	12 December 2018	Michelle Jenner	45.000 (0,5%)
138	54	13 December 2018	Zahara	47.000 (0,5%)
139	55	17 December 2018	Lori Meyers	61.000 (0,7%)
140	56	18 December 2018	Jon Sistiaga and Joe Pérez-Orive	
141	57	19 December 2018	Lydia Valentín	
142	58	20 December 2018	Arturo Valls	
143	59	7 January 2019	Paco León	59.000 (0,6%)
144	60	8 January 2019	Santiago Lorenzo	64.000 (0,6%)
145	61	9 January 2019	Asaari Bibang and Penny Jay	48.000 (0,6%)
146	62	10 January 2019	Nacho Vigalondo	
147	63	14 January 2019	Ana Fernández	
148	64	15 January 2019	Ana Morgade	51.000 (0,5%)
149	65	16 January 2019	Desirée Vila	43.000 (0,5%)
150	66	17 January 2019	Óscar Jaenada	51.000 (0,6%)
151	67	21 January 2019	Malena Alterio and Daniel Guzmán	91.000 (1,0%)
152	68	22 January 2019	La Zowi	61.000 (0,6%)
153	69	23 January 2019	Laia Sanz	62.000 (0,7%)
154	70	24 January 2019	Coque Malla	52.000 (0,5%)
155	71	28 January 2019	Lola Índigo	53.000 (0,6%)
156	72	29 January 2019	César Noval	65.000 (0,7%)
157	73	30 January 2019	Anna Castillo	61.000 (0,6%)
158	74	31 January 2019	Ketama	67.000 (0,7%)
159	75	4 February 2019	Andreu Buenafuente and Silvia Abril	55.000 (0,6%)
160	76	5 February 2019	Amparo Llanos	99.000 (1,0%)
161	77	6 February 2019	Eva Navarro and Catalina Coll	
162	78	7 February 2019	Marcos Morán	45.000 (0,5%)
163	79	11 February 2019	Darío Brizuela	41.000 (0,5%)
164	80	12 February 2019	Andrea Duro	
165	81	13 February 2019	Cupido	
166	82	14 February 2019	Miki Esparbé and Federico Martín Bahamontes	
167	83	18 February 2019	Borja Iglesias	
168	84	19 February 2019	Cristina Castaño	
169	85	20 February 2019	Delaporte	
170	86	21 February 2019	Óscar Dorta	72.000 (0,8%)
171	87	25 February 2019	Okuda San Miguel	39.000 (0,4%)
172	88	26 February 2019	Mercedes Milá	
173	89	27 February 2019	Jean Reno and Gerardo Olivares	38.000 (0,4%)
174	90	28 February 2019	Berto Romero and Eva Ugarte	
175	91	4 March 2019	Javier Fernández López	55.000 (0,6%)
176	92	5 March 2019	Phantom Flex4K	51.000 (0,5%)
177	93	6 March 2019	Novedades Carminha	65.000 (0,7%)
178	94	7 March 2019	Marta Nieto	85.000 (1,0%)
179	95	11 March 2019	Ana Guerra	54.000 (0,6%)
180	96	12 March 2019	Oriol Pla, Blai Juanet and Marc Sastre and Ingrid García-Jonsson	
181	97	13 March 2019	Evaristo Páramos	
182	98	14 March 2019	Física o Química	
183	99	18 March 2019	Ian Gibson	64.000 (0,7%)
184	100	19 March 2019	María Escoté	52.000 (0,6%)
185	101	20 March 2019	Esther Acebo and Mariam Hernández	
186	102	21 March 2019	Lang Lang	
187	103	25 March 2019	Irene Ferreiro and Alba Planas	60.000 (0,7%)
188	104	26 March 2019	Don Patricio	50.000 (0,6%)
189	105	27 March 2019	Eneko Pou and Iker Pou	
190	106	28 March 2019	Gerard Piqué	82.000 (0,9%)
191	107	1 April 2019	Leiva	70.000 (0,8%)
192	108	2 April 2019	Amaia Salamanca	73.000 (0,8%)
193	109	3 April 2019	Cecilia Freire and César Saruchu	58.000 (0,6%)
194	110	4 April 2019	Ana Peleteiro	84.000 (0,9%)
195	111	8 April 2019	Alba Flores	81.000 (0,9%)
196	112	9 April 2019	Zoo	50.000 (0,4%)
197	113	10 April 2019	Natalia Tena, James Phelps and Oliver Phelps	64.000 (0,4%)
198	114	11 April 2019	Anitta	
199	115	22 April 2019	Enhamed Enhamed	80.000 (0,8%)
200	116	23 April 2019	Antonio Ramos	46.000 (0,4%)
201	117	24 April 2019	Miguel Ángel Muñoz	85.000 (0,9%)
202	118	25 April 2019	Noemí Casquet	72.000 (0,7%)
203	119	29 April 2019	Anni B Sweet and Ingrid García-Jonsson	60.000 (0,6%)
204	120	30 April 2019	Danny León	51.000 (0,5%)
205	121	2 May 2019	Rayden	48.000 (0,5%)
206	122	6 May 2019	Nadia de Santiago	
207	123	7 May 2019	Mario Casas and Óscar Casas	44.000 (0,5%)
208	124	8 May 2019	Vanesa Martín and Adriana Ugarte	45.000 (0,6%)
209	125	9 May 2019	Nicki Mason and Dj Nano	48.000 (0,4%)
210	126	13 May 2019	Iñaki Williams	51.000 (0,6%)
211	127	14 May 2019	Elisa Victoria	
212	128	15 May 2019	Macarena García	
213	129	16 May 2019	Salva Espín	48.000 (0,5%)
214	130	20 May 2019	El Langui and Pablo Pineda	58.000 (0,7%)
215	131	21 May 2019	Ara Malikian	54.000 (0,6%)
216	132	22 May 2019	Ivana Baquero	52.000 (0,6%)
217	133	23 May 2019	Ana Pastor	59.000 (0,6%)
218	134	27 May 2019	Nicolás Laprovittola	48.000 (0,6%)
219	135	28 May 2019	Desakato	52.000 (0,6%)
220	136	29 May 2019	Cayetana Guillén Cuervo	70.000 (0,8%)
221	137	30 May 2019	David Ferrer	82.000 (0,9%)
222	138	3 June 2019	Kílian Jornet	51.000 (0,6%)
223	139	4 June 2019	Amaia Romero	
224	140	5 June 2019	Fernando Colomo	51.000 (0,5%)
225	141	6 June 2019	Esther González	60.000 (0,6%)
226	142	10 June 2019	Iker Vicente	66.000 (0,8%)
227	143	11 June 2019	Anier	
228	144	12 June 2019	Candela Peña	42.000 (0,5%)
229	145	13 June 2019	Simon Hanselmann	
230	146	17 June 2019	Patricia Conde and Ángel Martín	65.000 (0,8%)
231	147	18 June 2019	Javier Álvarez	
232	148	19 June 2019	Manuela Vellés	103.000 (1,1%)
233	149	20 June 2019	Pepe Rodríguez	90.000 (1,0%)
234	150	24 June 2019	Jonathan Paredes	101.000 (1,2%)
235	151	25 June 2019	María León	46.000 (0,5%)
236	152	26 June 2019	Ms Nina	49.000 (0,6%)
237	153	27 June 2019	Javier Calvo and Javier Ambrossi (Los Javis)	61.000 (0,7%)
238	154	1 July 2019	Pepe Colubi	
239	155	2 July 2019	Paula Gonu	48.000 (0,5%)
240	156	3 July 2019	Li Saumet	51.000 (0,6%)
241	157	4 July 2019	Jordi Cruz	57.000 (0,7%)

=== Third season ===
Program	Season program	Date	Guest	Audience
242	1	10 September 2019	Alba Vázquez	66.000 (1,1%)
243	2	11 September 2019	Javier Botet	38.000 (0,4%)
244	3	12 September 2019	Jesús Vidal	
245	4	16 September 2019	Mina El Hammani	61.000 (0,7%)
246	5	17 September 2019	Víctor Claver	
247	6	18 September 2019	Mix Master Mike	
248	7	19 September 2019	David Fernández Ortiz and Juanra Bonet	51.000 (0,6%)
249	8	23 September 2019	El Niño de Elche	
250	9	24 September 2019	Eva Leira and Yolanda Serrano	53.000 (0,7%)
251	10	25 September 2019	Alberto Mielgo	
252	11	26 September 2019	Marian Álvarez and Asier Etxeandia	
253	12	30 September 2019	Mala Rodríguez	52.000 (0,6%)
254	13	1 October 2019	Viva Suecia	
255	14	2 October 2019	Laura Ester	
256	15	3 October 2019	Karra Erejalde	
257	16	7 October 2019	Sr.Cheeto, Orslok and Darío Eme Hache	75.000 (0,9%)
258	17	8 October 2019	Julio Maldonado	59.000 (0,7%)
259	18	9 October 2019	Dorian	
260	19	10 October 2019	Inma Cuesta and Gerard Piqué	72.000 (0,8%)
261	20	14 October 2019	Carolina Yuste	41.000 (0,5%)
262	21	15 October 2019	José Luis Campuzano and Hermes Calabria	
263	22	16 October 2019	Gonzo	46.000 (0,5%)
264	23	17 October 2019	Daniel Sánchez Arévalo	70.000 (0,8%)
265	24	21 October 2019	Estopa	57.000 (0,7%)
266	25	22 October 2019	Leticia Dolera	64.000 (0,8%)
267	26	23 October 2019	Iago Aspas	
268	27	24 October 2019	Apolonia Lapiedra	66.000 (0,7%)
269	28	28 October 2019	Beatriz Luengo	63.000 (0,9%)
270	29	29 October 2019	Queralt Castellet	50.000 (0,6%)
271	30	30 October 2019	Derby Motoreta's Burrito Kachimba	
272	31	31 October 2019	Ibai Llanos and Sjokz	
273	32	4 November 2019	Javier Rey and Adriana Ugarte	48.000 (0,4%)
274	33	5 November 2019	Sofía Reyes	50.000 (0,6%)
275	34	6 November 2019	Liliana Fernández and Elsa Baquerizo	
276	35	7 November 2019	Quim Gutiérrez	49.000 (0,5%)
277	36	11 November 2019	Recycled J	48.000 (0,6%)
278	37	12 November 2019	Lolita Flores	44.000 (0,6%)
279	38	13 November 2019	Especial Caja Mágica	
280	39	14 November 2019	Especial Caja Mágica	70.000 (0,8%)
281	40	18 November 2019	Brays Efe	49.000 (0,6%)
282	41	19 November 2019	Mario Casas and Natalia de Molina	49.000 (0,6%)
283	42	20 November 2019	Amaral	
284	43	21 November 2019	Paula Sainz-Pardo Hilara	51.000 (0,6%)
285	44	25 November 2019	Cornbread	61.000 (0,7%)
286	45	26 November 2019	Julián Villagrán	71.000 (0,8%)
287	46	27 November 2019	Greta Fernández	51.000 (0,6%)
288	47	28 November 2019	Sara Socas	
289	48	2 December 2019	Nadina de Armas	80.000 (0,9%)
290	49	3 December 2019	KaseO	87.000 (1,%)
291	50	4 December 2019	María Valverde	44.000 (0,5%)
292	51	9 December 2019	Carlos Cueva and Javier Camarena	
293	52	10 December 2019	Roberto Leal	
294	53	11 December 2019	Juan Lebrón Chincoa	68.000 (0,8%)
295	54	12 December 2019	Clara Lago	63.000 (0,7%)
296	55	16 December 2019	Marina Yers	76.000 (0,9%)
297	56	17 December 2019	Marta Hazas	88.000 (1.1%)
298	57	18 December 2019	Alejandro Valverde and Imanol Erviti	
299	58	19 December 2019	El Gran Wyoming	39.000 (0,5%)
300	59	7 January 2020	Toteking	116.000 (1,3%)
301	60	8 January 2020	Ana Fernández	62.000 (0,7%)
302	61	9 January 2020	Javier Cansado	59.000 (0,6%)
303	62	13 January 2020	Carmen Arrufat	62.000 (0,7%)
304	63	14 January 2020	Alex Pella	47.000 (0,5%)
305	64	15 January 2020	Dani Parejo	63.000 (0,8%)
306	65	16 January 2020	La Zowi	67.000 (0,8%)
307	66	20 January 2020	María Teresa Campos	59.000 (0,7%)
308	67	21 January 2020	Consuelo Alonso	81.000 (0,9%)
309	68	22 January 2020	Manuela Carmena	58.000 (0,7%)
310	69	23 January 2020	Chon Álvarez (Grandma's Grison)	
311	70	27 January 2020	Enric Auquer	60.000 (0,6%)
312	71	28 January 2020	Alex Dujshebaev, Joan Cañellas and Julen Aguinagalde	45.000 (0,5%)
313	72	29 January 2020	Cruz Cafuné	53.000 (0,6%)
314	73	30 January 2020	Miquel Montoro	59.000 (0,6%)
315	74	3 February 2020	Alexandra Rinder	48.000 (0,5%)
316	75	4 February 2020	Blanca Suárez, Nadia de Santiago and Ana Fernández	65.000 (0,7%)
317	76	5 February 2020	India Martínez	75.000 (0,9%)
318	77	6 February 2020	Jordi ENP	56.000 (0,6%)
319	78	10 February 2020	Silvia Alonso	56.000 (0,7%)
320	79	11 February 2020	José Manuel Calderón	53.000 (0,6%)
321	80	12 February 2020	Mar Leza	75.000 (0,9%)
322	81	13 February 2020	Jordi Évole	
323	82	17 February 2020	Twin Melody	55.000 (0,6%)
324	83	18 February 2020	Fernando Trueba	66.000 (0,8%)
325	84	19 February 2020	Alberto Ginés	59.000 (0,7%)
326	85	20 February 2020	Kira Miró	54.000 (0,6%)
327	86	24 February 2020	Florentino Fernández and José Mota	56.000 (0,7%)
328	87	25 February 2020	Danna Paola	48.000 (0,6%)
329	88	26 February 2020	What Parkour	81.000 (1,0%)
330	89	27 February 2020	Najwa Nimri	82.000 (0,9%)
331	90	2 March 2020	María Galiana	68.000 (0,7%)
332	91	3 March 2020	Carlota Prendes	106.000 (1,2%)
333	92	4 March 2020	Ana Mena	86.000 (1,0%)
334	93	5 March 2020	Nathalie Poza	46.000 (0,5%)
335	94	9 March 2020	El Jincho	66.000 (0,7%)
336	95	10 March 2020	Las Cholitas	96.000 (1,1%)
337	96	11 March 2020	Nicole Wallace, Hajar Brown and Celia Monedero	50.000 (0,6%)
338	97	12 March 2020	Miguel Lozano	60.000 (0,6%)
339	98	16 March 2020	Itziar Miranda and Manu Baqueiro	104.000 (1,0%)
340	99	23 March 2020	Paula Gonu	
341	100	25 March 2020	Bonaventura Clotet and Dani Parejo	
342	101	26 March 2020	Miquel Montoro	56.000 (0,6%)
343	102	30 March 2020	Úrsula Corberó and Jaime Lorente	67.000 (0,6%)
344	103	31 March 2020	Don Patricio, Uge and Bajo	71.000 (0,7%)
345	104	1 April 2020	Anna Castillo	63.000 (0,6%)
346	105	2 April 2020	Úrsula Corberó and Jaime Lorente	71.000 (0,6%)
347	106	7 April 2020	Joana Pastrana	
348	107	8 April 2020	Apolonia Lapiedra	69.000 (0,6%)
349	108	9 April 2020	Dani Martín	
350	109	15 April 2020	Ester Expósito	62.000 (0,6%)
351	110	16 April 2020	Ibai Llanos	59.000 (0,5%)
352	111	20 April 2020	Paco León and María León	
353	112	21 April 2020	Luis Cepeda	63.000 (0,6%)
354	113	22 April 2020	Cristina Castaño	
355	114	23 April 2020	Ayax	
356	115	27 April 2020	Pau Gasol	
357	116	28 April 2020	Antonio Orozco	59.000 (0,5%)
358	117	29 April 2020	Maria Teresa Campos and Candela Peña	51.000 (0,5%)
359	118	30 April 2020	C. Tangana	52.000 (0,4%)
360	119	4 May 2020	Julio Maldonado and Antoni Daimiel	
361	120	5 May 2020	Sofía Reyes	
362	121	6 May 2020	Greta Fernández	
363	122	7 May 2020	Guitarricadelafuente	
364	123	11 May 2020	Kidd Keo	
365	124	12 May 2020	Samantha Vallejo-Nágera, Jordi Cruz and Pepe Rodríguez	
366	125	13 May 2020	Maxi Iglesias	
367	126	14 May 2020	Salva Espín	
368	127	18 May 2020	Ana Milán	
369	128	19 May 2020	Cristina Abad	43.000 (0,5%)
370	129	20 May 2020	Lola índigo	
371	130	21 May 2020	Álex Ubago	
372	131	25 May 2020	Sara Sálamo	
373	132	26 May 2020	Cecilio G	
374	133	27 May 2020	Elisabet Casanovas	
375	134	28 May 2020	Blas Cantó	
376	135	1 June 2020	Gemeliers and Pepín Tre	
377	136	2 June 2020	Jaime Nava	
378	137	3 June 2020	Marta Díaz	
379	138	4 June 2020	Delaossa	
380	139	8 June 2020	Vanessa Romero	
381	140	9 June 2020	DjMaRiiO	
382	141	10 June 2020	Courage Adams	
383	142	11 June 2020	Edurne	
384	143	15 June 2020	Nia	
385	144	16 June 2020	Jorge Martínez	
