= David Muñoz (chef) =

Spanish chef

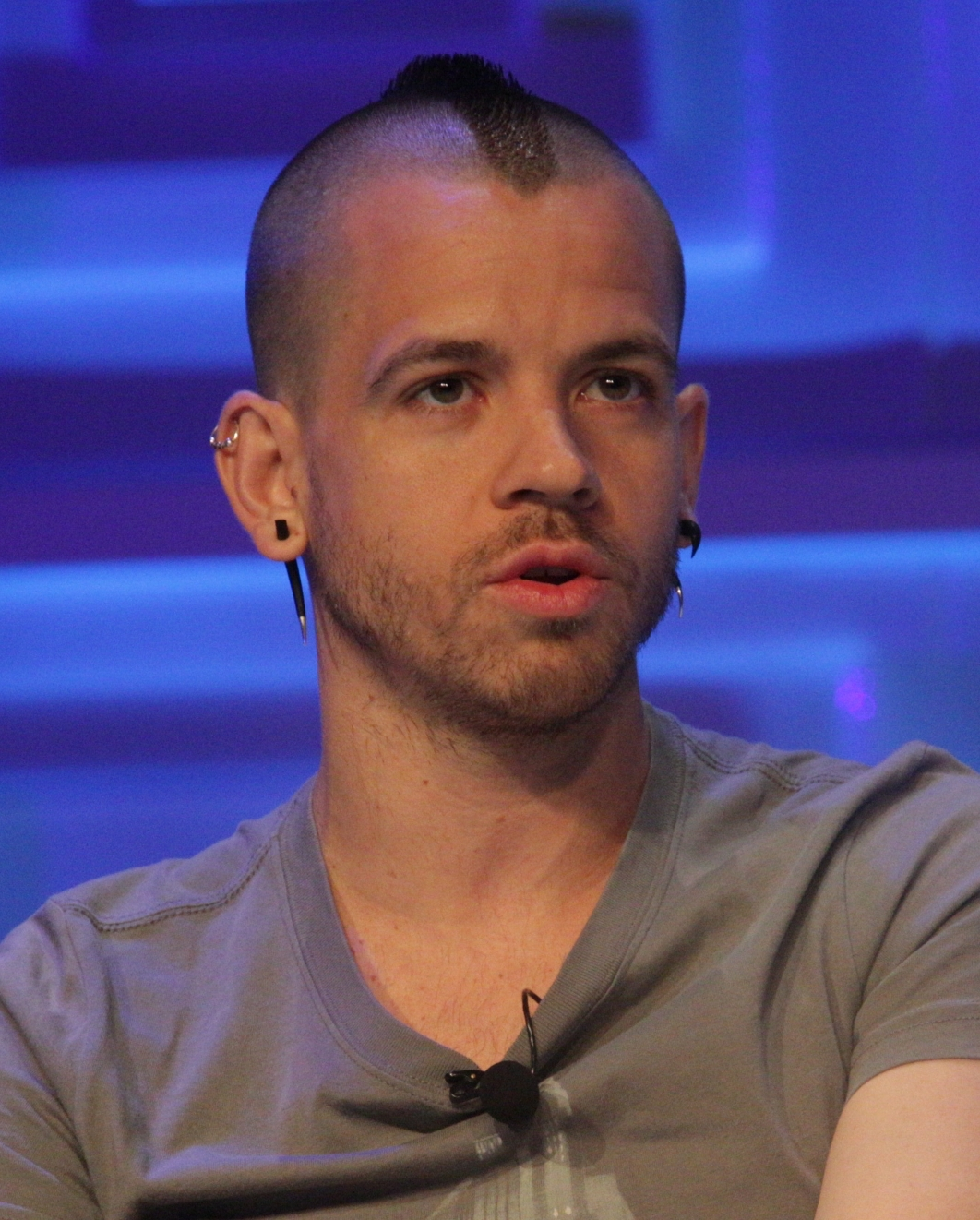
- Muñoz in 2015
- Born: David Muñoz Rosillo; 15 January 1980 (age 46); Madrid, Spain
- Other name: Dabiz
- Culinary career
- Rating
- Michelin Stars
- Current restaurants
- DiverXO; StreetXO; RavioXO

David Muñoz Rosillo (born 15 January 1980), also known as Dabiz Muñoz, is a Spanish chef specializing in avant-garde cuisine. He is the owner and head chef of DiverXO, which is the only restaurant in Madrid with three Michelin stars as of 2025. He was named the "Best Chef in the World" by The Best Chef Awards for three consecutive years (2021, 2022, and 2023).

== Career ==
=== Early years ===
After working at the Madrid restaurants Viridiana, Catamarán, and Chantarella, Muñoz moved to London, where he worked in restaurants specializing in Asian gastronomy. He returned to Madrid in 2007 to establish his own culinary style.

=== DiverXO ===
In 2007, Muñoz opened DiverXO, a fusion cuisine restaurant which quickly gained recognition for its complex techniques and global ingredients. It received its first Michelin star in 2010, followed by a second in 2012.

In 2013, DiverXO was awarded its third Michelin star, becoming the eighth restaurant in Spain to hold this distinction and the only one in Madrid. In 2014, the restaurant relocated to the NH Eurobuilding hotel in Madrid to accommodate its growing demand.

=== StreetXO ===
In 2012, Muñoz opened StreetXO, a more casual, street-food-oriented concept located in the Gourmet Experience area of El Corte Inglés on Calle Serrano, Madrid. In 2016, he expanded the brand internationally by opening StreetXO London in the Mayfair district. However, the London location permanently closed in 2020 due to the economic impact of the COVID-19 pandemic.

=== RavioXO ===
In 2022, Muñoz opened RavioXO, a restaurant dedicated to pasta and dumplings, located in the Gourmet Experience at El Corte Inglés de Castellana. Six months after opening, the restaurant was awarded its first Michelin star.

=== Awards ===
Muñoz was voted the number one chef in the world by The Best Chef Awards in 2011, 2022, and 2023.

=== Television ===
Muñoz has appeared in the following television programs and documentaries:

- Planeta Calleja (2014): He participated in an episode with adventurer Jesús Calleja, traveling to Peru.
- La que se avecina (2015)': He made a cameo appearance in this popular Spanish sitcom.
- El Xef (2016–2017): A documentary series broadcast on Cuatro. The first season followed his life as a chef in Madrid, while the second season (2017) focused on the opening of StreetXO London.
- UniverXo Dabiz (2024): In December 2024, Netflix released a five-part documentary series showcasing the chef's professional and personal life.

== Personal life ==
Muñoz was previously married to Ángela Montero Díaz, who was also a managing partner at DiverXO. In December 2014, he began a relationship with Spanish television presenter Cristina Pedroche. They married in a civil ceremony in 2015. The couple has two children: a daughter, Laia, born on 14 July 2023, and a son, Isai, born on 17 July 2025.
