= Alberto Chicote =

Spanish chef (born 1969)

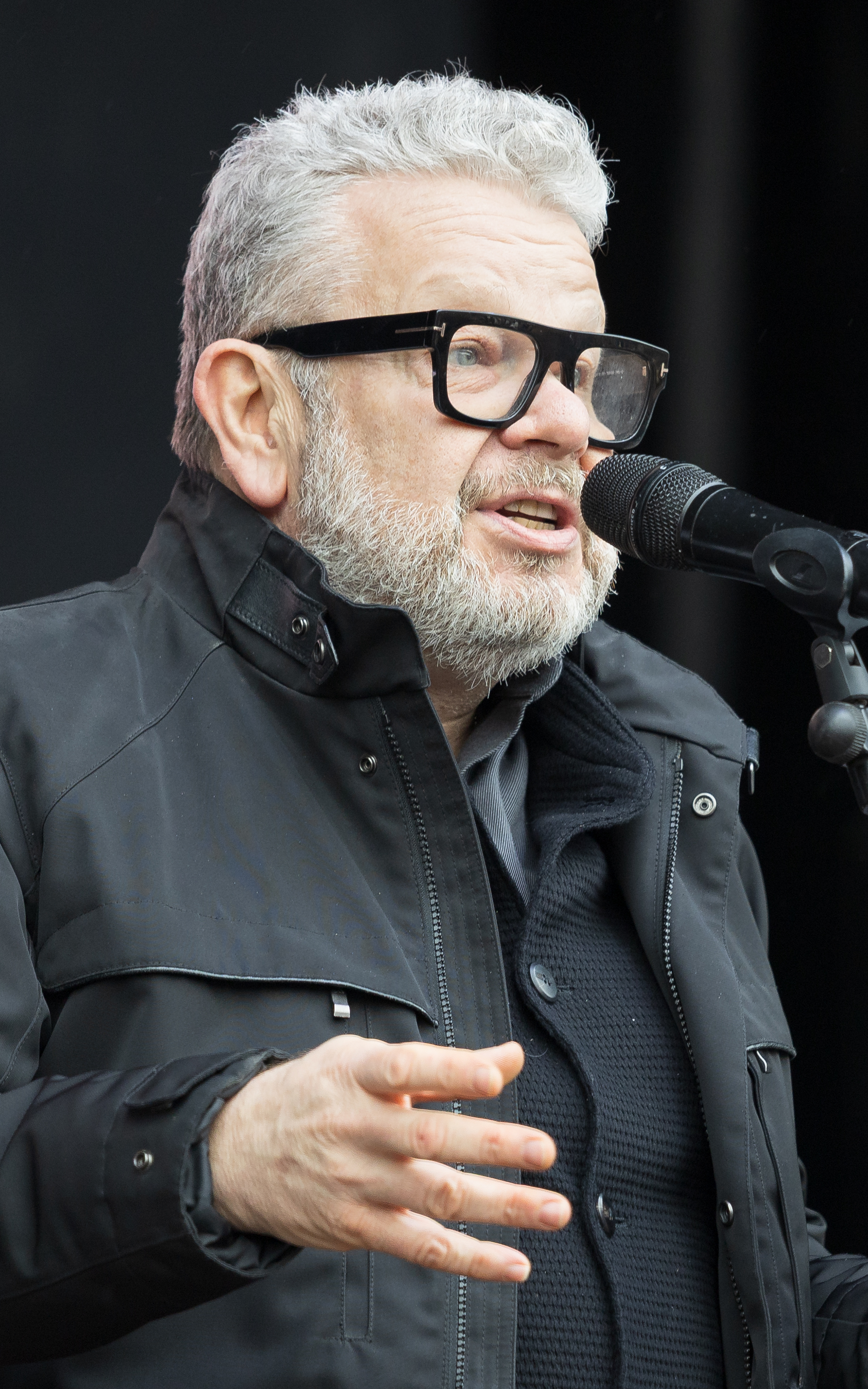
- Chicote in 2025
- Born: 23 June 1969 (age 57); Madrid, Community of Madrid, Spain
- Education: Escuela de hostelería de Madrid
- Occupation: Celebrity chef
- Culinary career
- Television shows
- Pesadilla en la cocina; Top Chef
- Awards
- Chef of the Year by the Congress Madrid Fusion; Chef of the Year by AMER; Most innovative AURA Award, the cook
- Website: albertochicote.com

Alberto Chicote del Olmo (born 23 June 1969), is a Spanish celebrity chef, restaurateur and TV presenter. He is known for mixing traditional cuisine with new technology, pioneering the so-called fusion cuisine: mixing foreign, mainly Asian, products and techniques with Spanish cuisine. He makes frequent appearances at gastronomic conferences (some as Madrid Fusion), as well as presentations, demonstrations and master classes around the world.

As a TV host, he came to fame with the Spanish adaptation of Kitchen Nightmares, titled Pesadilla en la cocina, on LaSexta. He has also had success with Top Chef on Antena 3. He is also well known for hosting the Twelve Grapes on Antena 3 every year since 2016/17, with Cristina Pedroche.

== Biography ==
At the age of 17, Chicote joined the Escuela de hostelería de Madrid in Casa de Campo Spain. During the nineties he worked in the kitchens of some famous restaurants of the time, such as Lúculo, owned by Ange García; Zalacaín, by Benjamín Urdiain; and La Recoleta by Belén Laguía. After his apprenticeship in Switzerland he met Salvador Gallego who greatly influenced his cooking knowledge. For the next four years, he worked as the Chef of El Cenachero where he strengthened his career by making a new kind of Andalusian cuisine that earned him recognition and success.

In 1987 he became the chef of the restaurant called NODE Benjamin Streets, with the aim of merging Spanish cuisine with Japanese cuisine. This project made him a pioneer of this type of cuisine in Spain. In 1995 he started working as a chef at El Cenachero, where he won plaudits for his reimagining of Andalusian cuisine.

In 2005 he won the award for 'best chef of the year' at the Madrid Fusion event.

In 2006, he also began working as chef at Pan de Lujo, a local restaurant with a marked taste for aesthetics, continuing his formula of mixing cuisine from multiple cultures. He coordinated his position as executive chef at both restaurants. For a time he was responsible for the food section of the Sunday magazine of El País. He also presented a radio section on Toni Garrido's RNE show dedicated to food, called Asuntos propios.

In 2012 he became the presenter of Pesadilla en la cocina on TV channel LaSexta, where he visits restaurants and helps their owners to sort their issues. Although he has been criticised by some of the restaurant owners featured on the show for heavy-handedness, the show became a hit and Chicote quickly became a network star. At the end of the year, he was chosen by laSexta to present the Twelve Grapes with Sandra Sabatés. He returned to host the bells in 2015/16 with journalist Andrea Ropero. In addition to Pesadilla en la cocina, he is the judge and presenter of Top Chef on Antena 3.

In 2014 he opened his own restaurant, called Yakitoro. Chicote's menu reinterprets Japanese cuisine, and its success on the Gran Vía led him to open a second restaurant on the Paseo de la Castellana. In 2016 he opened the Puertalsol restaurant with more conventional Spanish cuisine, in a partnership with department store El Corte Inglés on the Puerta del Sol.

Since 2016/17, Chicote has hosted the Twelve Grapes on Antena 3 with Cristina Pedroche. Their partnership has brought steadily increasing ratings, and led viewership on the night from 2020/21 until 2023/24.

Chicote left Yakitoro in November 2020 to focus on a new venture with Inmaculada Núñez, called Omeraki, where he would focus on more seasonal products and recipes with a more personal touch. The new restaurant opened on 7 June 2022.

== Personal life ==
Aside from food, Chicote is a fan of rugby and archery, and had to leave the former when he took up cooking. He formed part of the Madrid rugby team in his youth, playing alongside Javier Bardem.

== TV appearances ==
Years	Programme	Channel	Role
2012–2023	Pesadilla en la cocina	LaSexta	Presenter
2012/2013	Directo al 2013	LaSexta	Co-presenter with Sandra Sabatés
2013–2017	Top Chef	Antena 3	Presenter
2015–2016	El precio de los alimentos	LaSexta	Presenter
2015/2016	Directo al 2016	LaSexta	Co-presenter with Andrea Ropero
2016	Los mitos de los alimentos	Antena 3	Presenter
2016	Superalimentos	Antena 3	Presenter
2016	Dietas a examen	Antena 3	Presenter
2016	Nuevos mitos de los alimentos	Antena 3	Presenter
2016/2017–present	Campanadas de fin de año	Antena 3	Co-presenter with Cristina Pedroche
2017	En forma en 70 días	Antena 3	Presenter
2017	¿Qué comen nuestros hijos?	Antena 3	Presenter
2018	Comer bien por menos	LaSexta	Presenter
2018–2023	¿Te lo vas a comer?	LaSexta	Presenter
2020	Auténticos	LaSexta	Presenter
2021	Fuera del mapa	LaSexta	Presenter
2023	Hablando en plata	Antena 3	Presenter
2024–present	Batalla de restaurantes	LaSexta	Presenter
2026–present	Secret Service by Chicote	LaSexta	Presenter

=== As a guest ===
Years	Programme	Channel	Role
2018	El Hormiguero	Antena 3	Guest
2019	El Hormiguero	Antena 3	Guest
2020	El Hormiguero	Antena 3	Guest
2021	El Hormiguero	Antena 3	Guest
2023	El Hormiguero	Antena 3	Guest
2024	El Hormiguero	Antena 3	Guest
2026	Una fiesta de muerte	Antena 3	Contestant

== Awards ==
He has received several awards such as:

- Chef of the Year in Congress Madrid Fusion
- Chef of the Year 2006 by the AMER
- AURA Award, the most innovative chefs
- Chef of the restaurant in 2011 by World
- Madrid Fusion Award to the best artists of the decade.
- Best TV presenter TV rioja
- 2013 Nécora Award 2013 to gastroviajero character
- 2013 Qemos Award
- 2013 Festival Award for the program "Pesadilla en la cocina"
