= Love Island Spain =

- Genre: Reality
- Created by: ITV Studios
- Based on: Love Island by Richard Cowles
- Presented by: Cristina Pedroche
- Country of origin: Spain
- Original language: Spanish
- No. of seasons: 3

Production
- Executive producer: Maarten Meijs (ITV Studios)
- Production locations: Gran Canaria, Spain
- Running time: 60 minutes
- Production companies: ITV Studios; Atresmedia; Boomerang TV

Original release
- Network: Neox
- Release: 11 April 2021 – 30 June 2022

Love Island Spain (Spanish: Love Island España) is a Spanish dating reality show based on the international Love Island franchise.

Following the premise of other versions of the Love Island format, the show features a group of single contestants, known as "islanders" who live together in a specially constructed villa that is isolated from the outside world, in an attempt to find love. The islanders are continuously monitored during their stay in the house by live television cameras as well as personal audio microphones. Throughout the series, the contestants "couple up" to avoid being dumped from the villa. Additionally, Spain will vote for their favourite islanders to stay in the villa at points in the series. As old islanders are dumped, new islanders will enter the villa. At the end of the season, Spain will vote one final time to determine the winning couple.

== Format ==
Love Island involves a group of contestants, referred to as Islanders, living in isolation from the outside world in a villa in Gran Canaria, constantly under video surveillance. To survive in the villa the Islanders must be coupled up with another Islander, whether it be for love, friendship or survival, as the overall winning couple receives €50,000. On the first day, the Islanders couple up for the first time based on first impressions, but over the duration of the series, they are forced to "re-couple" where they can choose (or be chosen) to remain in their current couple or swap and change.

Any Islander who remains single, after the coupling, is eliminated and "dumped" from the island. Islanders can also be eliminated via a public vote during the series. The public can vote for their favorite couple or who they think is the most compatible through the Love Island app available on smartphones. Couples who receive the fewest votes risk being eliminated. Occasionally, twists may occur where the islanders must eliminate each other. During the final week, the public vote for which couple they want to win the series and take home the prize.

Whilst in the villa, each Islander has their own phone with which they can only contact other Islanders via text – or receive texts informing them of the latest challenges, dumping, or re-coupling. Islanders and couples must typically take part in many games and challenges designed to test their physical and mental abilities, with the winners receiving special prizes afterward. Some Islanders are also sent on dates outside the villa or can win dates by winning challenges.

== Production ==
=== Development ===
On 21 September 2020, it was announced by ITV Studios that a Spanish version of Love Island was in pre-production. It was commissioned by Atresmedia and will air on Neox.

On 15 March 2021, Cristina Pedroche was confirmed as host of the show.

== Episodes ==
Series	Days	Islanders	Winner	Runner-up	Prize Money	Location	Episodes	Originally released	
Series	Days	Islanders	Winner	Runner-up	Prize Money	Location	Episodes	First released	Last released
1	30	26	Celia Zanón & Miguel Folgoso	Adele Montano & Jovan Soto	€50,000	Gran Canaria	30	11 April 2021	20 May 2021
2	31	30	Luis Titans & Yaiza Cabello	Alberto Montelongo & Ruth Román	€50,000	Gran Canaria	30	22 May 2022	30 June 2022
