= Noemí Casquet =

Spanish journalist

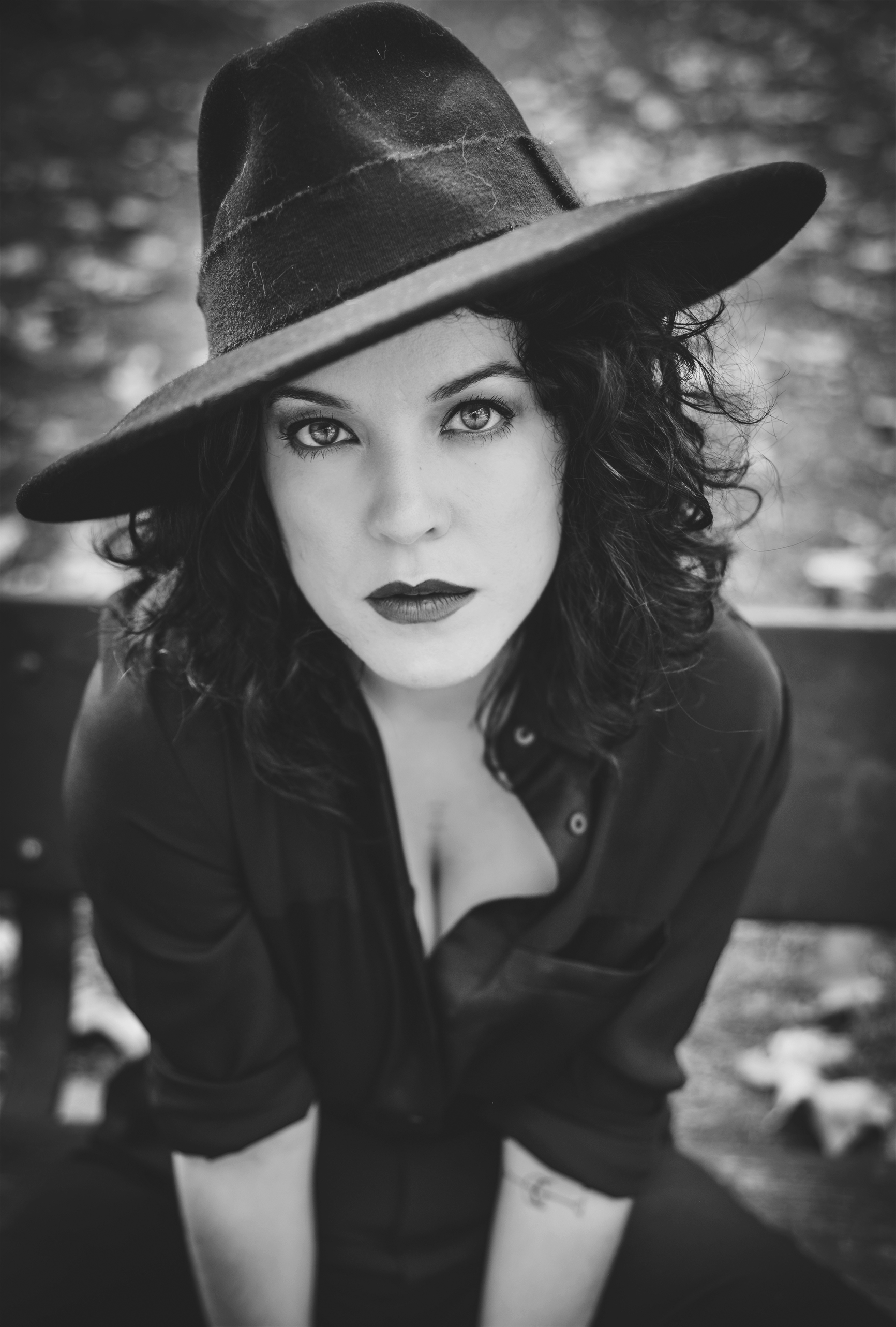
- Born: 7 February 1992 (age 34); Sabadell, Spain
- Occupations: Journalist and writer

Noemí Casquet (Sabadell, February 7, 1992) is a Spanish journalist and writer specializing in sexual disclosure and research on ancestral sexuality. She has been a presenter of television programs and programs on on-line platforms and has participated as a writer and columnist for some recognized media. Casquet is also in charge of Santo Amor, which is the first platform for explicit sex education.

== Professional career ==
=== Collaborations in the media ===
In recent years, Casquet has collaborated with several media, being interviewed by El País and El Periódico, and has also appeared in other media such as El Mundo, El Español and Europa Press, where she has been interviewed on numerous occasions talking about taboo topics such as polyamory, sex, or the differences between men and women in relation to their sexuality. In addition, she has collaborated on several occasions on different radio broadcasts, such as RTVE talking about her book Cuerpos; Radio Euskadi claiming the concept of sex as "a weapon of mass revolution" and Cadena Ser - Radio Cartagena, talking about how people thank her for having changed their sex lives.

As for her approach as a TV show host, in 2021, she presents the program Llámalo X (produced by RTVE in collaboration with Dadá Films and Entertainment), which features interviews related to the world of gender and sexuality, dealing with realities such as polyamory, new masculinities, transsexuality or asexuality.

She has also appeared in programs such as La Resistencia (Movistar+) and in the Adolescents XL program (TV3 a la Carta).

Noemí Casquet was also a presenter at the Barcelona Erotic Salon in 2019. In addition, in 2020, she will take part in the TEDTalk x UCM event, where she will emphasize the importance of sex liberation and naturalization based on her own experiences.

It is expected that in 2022, Atresmedia will make a small-screen adaptation of Casquet's trilogy "Zorras, Malas y Libres". Several sources, such as Infoliteraria, have confirmed that the series will begin filming this year. The author has stated the following about the news: "There will be a lot of sex. because we will discuss sexuality Because it will have that essential feminist base. Because we will bet, as always, on relational, gender and sexual diversity".

=== Publications ===
Noemí Casquet has written, to date, seven erotic novels (a trilogy, a biography, and two novellas), of which she has made presentations throughout Spain. With them, he has managed to make the leap to America (thanks to the tour of his latest biography at the International Book Fair-Guadalajara 2021, in México). Likewise, her biography Cuerpos y Almas will be published this year in Argentina, México, Colombia, Chile and the U.S. (in Spanish).

==== Zorras, Malas y Libres (Ediciones B, Penguin Random House) ====
Published in 2020, this is the erotic novel trilogy that has revolutionized the market. The first volume, starring Alicia and her friends Diana and Emily, is already in its sixth edition. In addition, it was one of the bestsellers in Spain for several months (100,000 units sold). This trilogy has undoubtedly marked the beginning Noemí Casquet's career as a novelist.

==== Mala Mujer (edited by Lunwerg - Grupo Planeta) ====
It's Noemí Casquet's first book. It was published in 2019 and has ten editions and more than 30,000 copies sold in just one year. On Amazon, it is the best-selling book in the Sex Guides category. In addition, for six weeks it was positioned in Spain as one of the best–selling non–fiction novel books.

In this book, the journalist analyzes gender identity labels, talks about sexual identity, the menstrual cycle (and its relationship with the lunar cycle), masturbation, feminism, sexuality, and love.

==== Cuerpos y Almas (Ediciones B) ====
Noemí Casquet's latest biography was published in 2021 and deals with identity and desire through a story full of passion, eroticism, and depth.

It is the novel that crowns Noemí Casquet as one of the most influential novelists in the struggle for women's liberation, even though she was afraid and dizzy at the idea of publishing it. Published in 2021, it is a novel that, according to Casquet, "has a lot of her, of the relationships she has had throughout her life with men," and that "will not leave anyone indifferent".

The first part of the biography is Bodies, and the second, which I have recently published, is Souls. With them, I seek the acceptance of the light and shadow that all human beings have. The covers already give a clue: the one for Bodies shows the darkness and the introspection of the entrails of a woman, while the one for Souls shows the search for the light and the way out of all that mud. I also want us to question what is right and what is wrong, because it is such a fine line that many times we do not know how to identify it (Casquet, 2021).
