= La revuelta (TV series) =

- Genre: Talk show; Variety show
- Directed by: Ricardo Castella
- Presented by: David Broncano
- Starring: Ricardo Castella; Jorge Ponce; Marcos Martínez "Grison"
- Opening theme: No Cap by Trueno (2024–2026); Oye by FERNANDOCOSTA ft. Dollar Selmouni (2026–present)
- Original language: Spanish
- No. of seasons: 1

Production
- Production locations: Príncipe Gran Vía Theater, Madrid
- Running time: 80 minutes
- Production companies: RTVE; El Terrat

Original release
- Network: La 1
- Release: 9 September 2024 – present

Related
- La resistencia

La revuelta (lit. 'The revolt') is a Spanish talk show broadcast on La 1 since 9 September 2024. Hosted by David Broncano, it is broadcast from Monday to Thursday at 9:40 p.m, after Telediario. It is the sequel of the talk show La resistencia, which was made by the same team and aired on pay-per-view channel #0.

== Format ==
David Broncano, together with Jorge Ponce, Ricardo Castella and their other collaborators, command La revuelta, a comedy program that includes multiple sections and interviews from the Príncipe Gran Vía Theater in Madrid.

== Audiences ==
In its first 13 weeks the program was the most viewed in Spain for 36 out of 50 episodes with an average of 2,067,000 viewers. Broncano's achievement took many by surprise, as while the show was expected to do well against its competitor El Hormiguero on rival network Antena 3, La revuelta beat El Hormiguero on its second day on air, despite the latter having led the timeslot for ten straight years before La Revuelta's success.

In 2025, El Hormiguero conclusively regained its lead over La revuelta. Both observers and Broncano himself suggested that the reason for the ratings decline was the success of La isla de las tentaciones and the "Montoya effect", which took away the youth audience that had previously flocked to Brancano's show. When Montoya and the associated parties joined Supervivientes, Broncano's show continued to fall.

On 10 November 2025, the episode featuring singer Rosalía scored the show a strong ratings lead over El Hormiguero, securing both the show's highest share and raw overnight viewership. The show's largest ratings came with Prime Minister Pedro Sánchez's visit on 22 October 2026, with 4,387,000 viewers and a 33.9% share, peaking at 4,761,000 and 40.4%. This was bettered by Vox leader Santiago Abascal's visit on 9 November 2026, which attracted 4,815,000 viewers and a 33.6% share, including a 50.7% share among 13–24 year olds. David Broncano's performance and Abascal's answers in the interview were both widely criticised, with critic Jesús Ruíz Mantilla in El País calling it "probably the worst interview in TV history" and Antena 3 journalist Vicente Vallés suggesting politicians went to entertainment programmes to escape traditional journalistic interviews. Broncano opened the following night's episode in a funereal tone, accepting the blame for the poor interview and apologising to the audience for the previous night's episode.

== Awards ==
Year	Award	Category	Nominee(s)	Result	Ref.
2024	Ondas National Television Award	Best Entertainment Program		Won	
2025	26th Iris Awards	Best Show (Entertainment)		Pending	
2025	26th Iris Awards	Best Presenter (Entertainment)	David Broncano	Pending	
2025	26th Iris Awards	Best Direction (TV Shows)	David Broncano, Ricardo Castella, Jorge Ponce	Pending	
2025	26th Iris Awards	Best Screenplay (Entertainment)	Javier Valera, Diego Fabiano, Helena Pozuelo, Daniel Álvarez, Elena Beltrán, Javier Díaz-Pines, Xavi Daura, Sandra Flores, Manuel Álvarez, Yunez Chaib, Ignacio Rubin, Miguel Campos	Pending	

== Controversies ==
=== La Revuelta and El Hormiguero ===
Since La revuelta's direct competitor, Atresmedia's El Hormiguero, is perceived as critical of Spanish prime minister Pedro Sánchez, the high-profile hiring of Broncano by public broadcaster RTVE generated public scrutiny and controversy among right-wing media. It also brought internal strife among RTVE's board, particularly as it is split among party lines, and the ensuing tit-for-tat dismissals of José Pablo López (as director of content) and Elena Sánchez (as interim chair). Regarding accusations of political bias, Broncano said "to say that Pedro Sánchez has chosen me is ridiculous, offensive and a lie." El Hormiguero collaborator Juan del Val claimed that "the problem is not Broncano, the problem is that La Moncloa wants to end Pablo Motos".

On 21 November 2024, David Broncano announced that he would not be able to interview that day's guest, 2024 MotoGP World Championship champion Jorge Martín, who was already in the programme's dressing room, because he had been pressured to go on El Hormiguero first. Due to being unable to broadcast the interview with Martín (which was shot nonetheless, but later lost) on that date, La revuelta chose to air twelve minutes of dialogue-free footage from a documentary on the bellow of a deer instead. El Hormiguero host Pablo Motos claimed that it was "a misunderstanding" and that the controversy was an example of "journalistic malpractice".

=== Santiago Abascal's interview ===
During the 2026 election period in Spain, Broncano announced on November 5 during the talk show that Santiago Abascal, president of far-right political party Vox, will be a guest on November 9. Part of the audience booed the annoucement, which both Broncano and Marcos Grison jokingly responded that they would have to search a new audience for Abascal's interview. Abascal will be the fourth candidate to be interviewed on the program, after previous interviews with Spanish prime minister Pedro Sánchez and politicians Irene Montero and Gabriel Rufián, all three on October. He will also be the first right-wing candidate to be interviewed, since the opposition leader and People's Party president Alberto Núñez Feijóo has not yet responded to the invitation from the program.

Few days before the planned interview, people invited to that day’s program reported on social media that their tickets had been cancelled, as notified via an email from the show's production company El Terrat. The email also stated that, "due to special circumstances, the recording will take place under different conditions regarding the schedule and the audience", sparking controversy. Neither RTVE nor Broncano made a annoucement about the changes. Vox representatives and La Revuelta team held talks to determine the interview, but it's unknown if the change of the audience were one of the topics. La Séptima reported that the program will allegedly use a casting process to select the audience and that Vox had initially proposed bringing its own attendees which was reportedly not accepted, but this has not been confirmed.

== Audiences ==
Series	Episodes	Dates		Series average		Strongest				Weakest			
Series	Episodes	Premiere date	End date	Viewers	Share	Date	Guest	Viewers	Share	Date	Guest	Viewers	Share
1	159	09/09/2024	10/07/2025	1,681,000	13.5%	12/09/2024	Raúl Cimas	2,601,000	19.2%	16/01/2025	Fernando Arrabal; Carolina Yuste	699,000	13.6%
2	160	08/09/2025	16/07/2026	1,373,000	11.7%	10/11/2025	Rosalía	2,706,000	20.4%	10/07/2026	Adriana Torrebejano	501,000	10.9%
3	TBC	07/09/2026	July 2027			09/11/2026	Santiago Abascal	4,815,000	33.6%	14/10/2026	Salvador Sobral	1,051,000	8.8%
