= Late Motiv =

- Genre: Late-night talk show
- Directed by: Marc Amorós
- Presented by: Andreu Buenafuente
- Starring: Silvia Abril; Berto Romero; David Broncano; Javier Coronas; Joaquín Reyes; Raúl Pérez
- No. of seasons: 7
- No. of episodes: 945

Production
- Production locations: Tres Cantos, Madrid
- Running time: 60 minutes approx.
- Production companies: El Terrat; Movistar+

Original release
- Network: Canal+ (January 2016) #0 (from February 2016)
- Release: January 11, 2016 – December 23, 2021

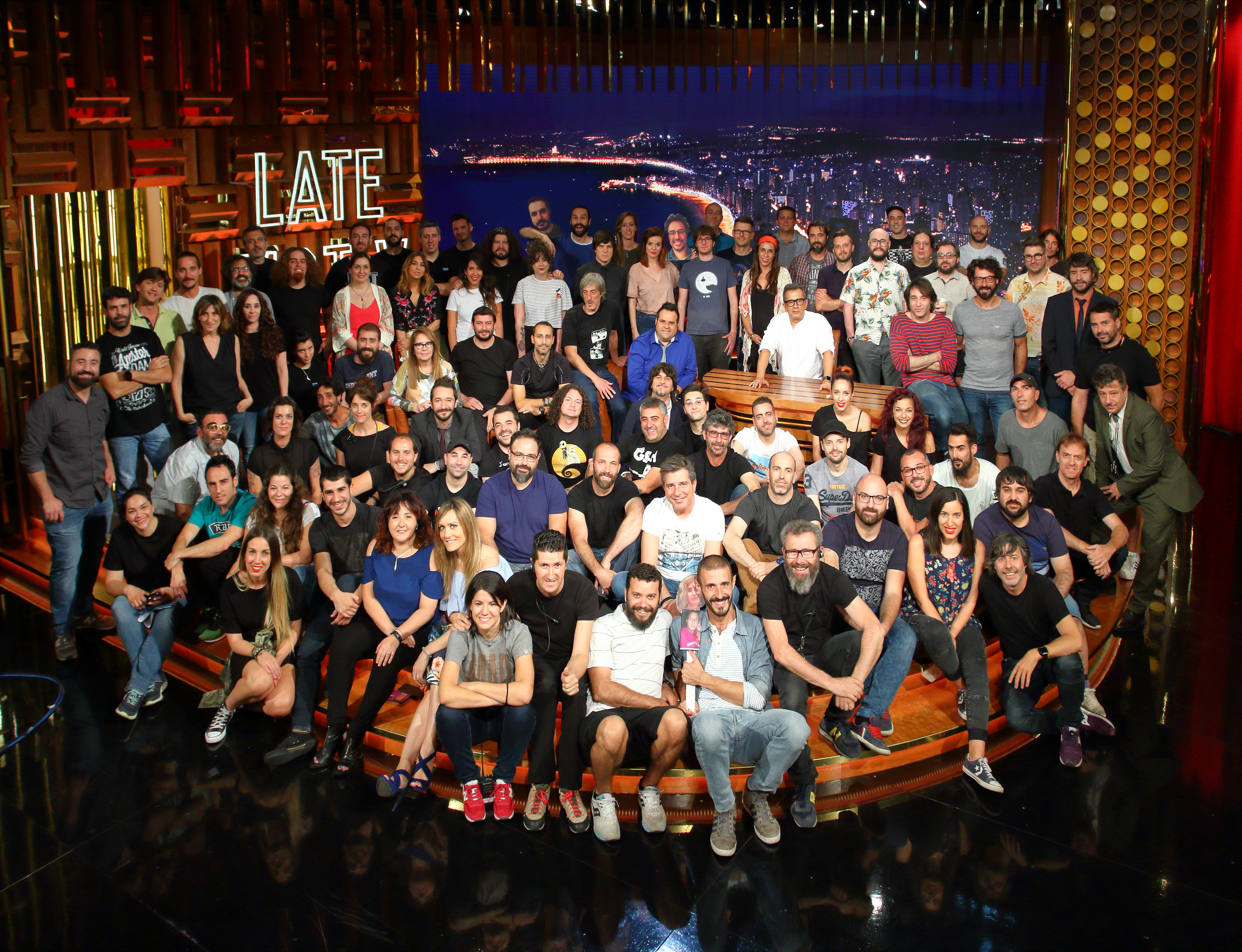
Andreu Buenafuente (sitting behind the table) with the show's crew.

Late Motiv (also known as Late Motiv de Andreu Buenafuente) is a Spanish late-night talk show hosted by Andreu Buenafuente. It airs on #0, the flagship TV channel of subscription platform Movistar+, and is Buenafuente's first program to air on pay television.

== History ==
In September 2015 it was confirmed that Atresmedia had cancelled Andreu Buenafuente's show on laSexta, En el aire, after two seasons, which meant the host was no longer linked to the media group. Shortly afterward his signing for Movistar+ was announced, as the platform aimed to sign a roster of well-known presenters to launch #0.

By December 2015 the first details of Buenafuente's show on Movistar+ were revealed: it would be named Late Motiv and the host would continue to count on former En el aire collaborators Berto Romero, Roberto Enríquez (also known as "Bob Pop") and Javier Coronas, joined by comedian David Broncano and the actor Llimoo. During the second season, the cast was joined by Devon Knight, a fictional character played by Joaquín Reyes, who would do a weekly comedic news recap. In early 2018, Broncano left Late Motiv to focus on his own show, La Resistencia, which premiered on February 1.

The two main novelties of the show were Buenafuente's return to the classic American late-night format, complete with a house band, and the host filming his show outside the Province of Barcelona for the first time ever, moving to Movistar+' studios in Madrid. Late Motiv premiered on Canal+ on January 11, 2016, three weeks before the station was discontinued for the launch of #0.
