= Fernando Costa (rapper) =

Spanish rapper (born 1995)

- Born: Fernando Costa Morales; 14 July 1995 (age 31); Ibiza, Spain
- Occupations: Rapper, composer, singer
- Years active: 2014–present

Fernando Costa Morales, his stage name often stylised as FERNANDOCOSTA (born 14 July 1995), is a Spanish rapper and songwriter.

His lyrics are known for incorporating themes of working-class life in Spain, mixing traditional rap themes with social commentary on 2020s themes.

== Early life ==
Fernando Costa was born in Ibiza into a working-class family. During his childhood, he spent time between Ibiza and Granada, two places that influenced his personality and musical style. From a young age, Fernando showed an interest in music, particularly rap, inspired by both Spanish and international artists such as Violadores del Verso, Nach, SFDK and Tote King. His adolescence was marked by experiences that he would later express in his lyrics, standing out for his ability to narrate authentic stories connected to the reality of the street.

== Musical career ==
Costa started his career publishing music on YouTube and SoundCloud. By 2014, his first songs began to catch the attention of underground hip-hop fans.

In 2018, Fernando released his first studio album, "Yipiyou". This album was a success in the national rap scene and opened doors for him to collaborate with other influential artists in the genre.

In 2022, he released his second studio album, "Tirititando". Songs like "Shorty" and "Hasta Cuando" stand out for their emotional depth and elaborate production, establishing themselves as essential pieces in her discography.

That same year, Fernando reached a new milestone in his career by performing at Madrid's iconic WiZink Center. This concert, not only demonstrated his ability to fill large venues but also solidified his position as one of the most influential artists on the current Spanish music scene.

== Discography ==
- Yipiyou (2018)
- Tirititando (2022)
- Amor de Barrio (2025)

== Style and themes ==
Fernando is distinguished by his lyrics that address the realities of urban life, personal experiences, and social issues. His style combines elements of classic rap with contemporary influences. The themes of their songs range from reflections on everyday life to critiques of social inequalities, always with a narrative that captivates the listener.

== Collaborations and acknowledgments ==
Throughout his career, Fernando has worked with some of the biggest names in Spanish rap and urban music. His most notable collaborations include work with Natos y Waor, Recycled J, Lia Kali, and Kase.O, among others. These partnerships have enriched his musical style and allowed him to reach new audiences.

In addition to his collaborations, he has been a regular guest at music festivals such as Viña Rock, Arenal Sound, and Mad Cool, where his energy on stage and connection with the audience have been widely praised. His music has received recognition for both its lyrical quality and authenticity, establishing him as an influential voice within Spanish hip hop.
