= Paula Gonu =

Catalan influencer

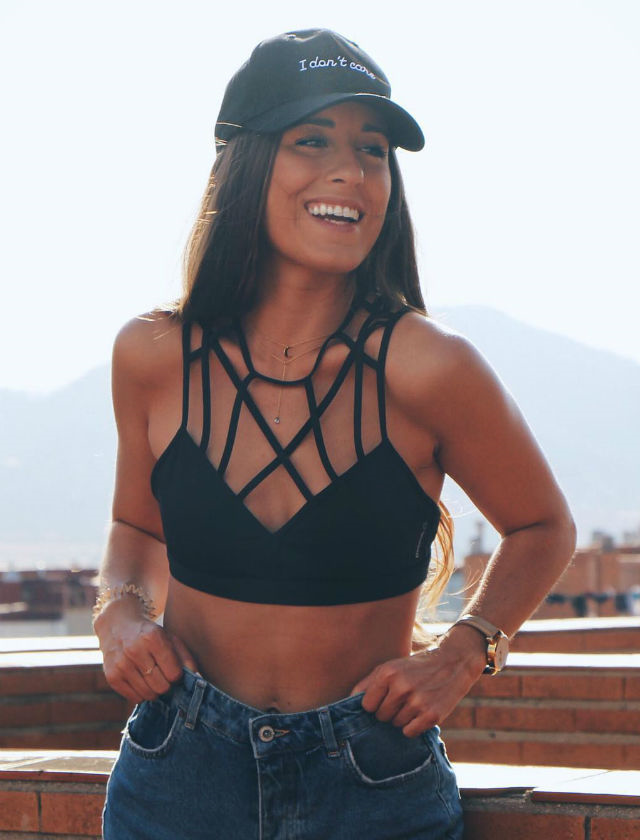
- Paula Gonu in 2018
- Born: Paula González Núñez; 31 March 1993 (age 33); Badalona, Catalonia, Spain
- Education: Universitat Pompeu Fabra
- Occupations: Influencer, YouTuber and Instagrammer
- Partner: Álex Chiner (–2019)

Paula González Núñez, known as Paula Gonu (born 31 March 1993), is a Spanish influencer, YouTuber and Instagrammer. Between 2018 and 2019 she was the third most important influencer in Spain.

== Biography ==
She lived in Cornellà de Llobregat and worked as clerk, public relations and event host. Her brother Víctor was adopted and suffered from fetal alcohol syndrome. She studied at Pompeu Fabra University and got a bachelor's degree on Advertising.

== Career ==
During a trip to Formentera in 2016, she made public her Instagram account, where she shared photos and videos with her partner, Alex Chiner. They broke up in 2019. Her popularity increased in October 2016, when she got from 200.000 to a million followers and 500.000 on YouTube. For that she received commercial sponsorships from brands such as Garnier and Rimmel London. Later she set up her residence in Barcelona.

She wrote De (casi) todo se aprende which was published in 2018. She opened an online shop in which she sells T-shirts and sweaters. In 2020 she appeared in the TV3 program Alguna pregunta més?, and in 2024 in the first edition of Bake Off: Famosos al horno.
