= Twelve Grapes =

Spanish New Year tradition

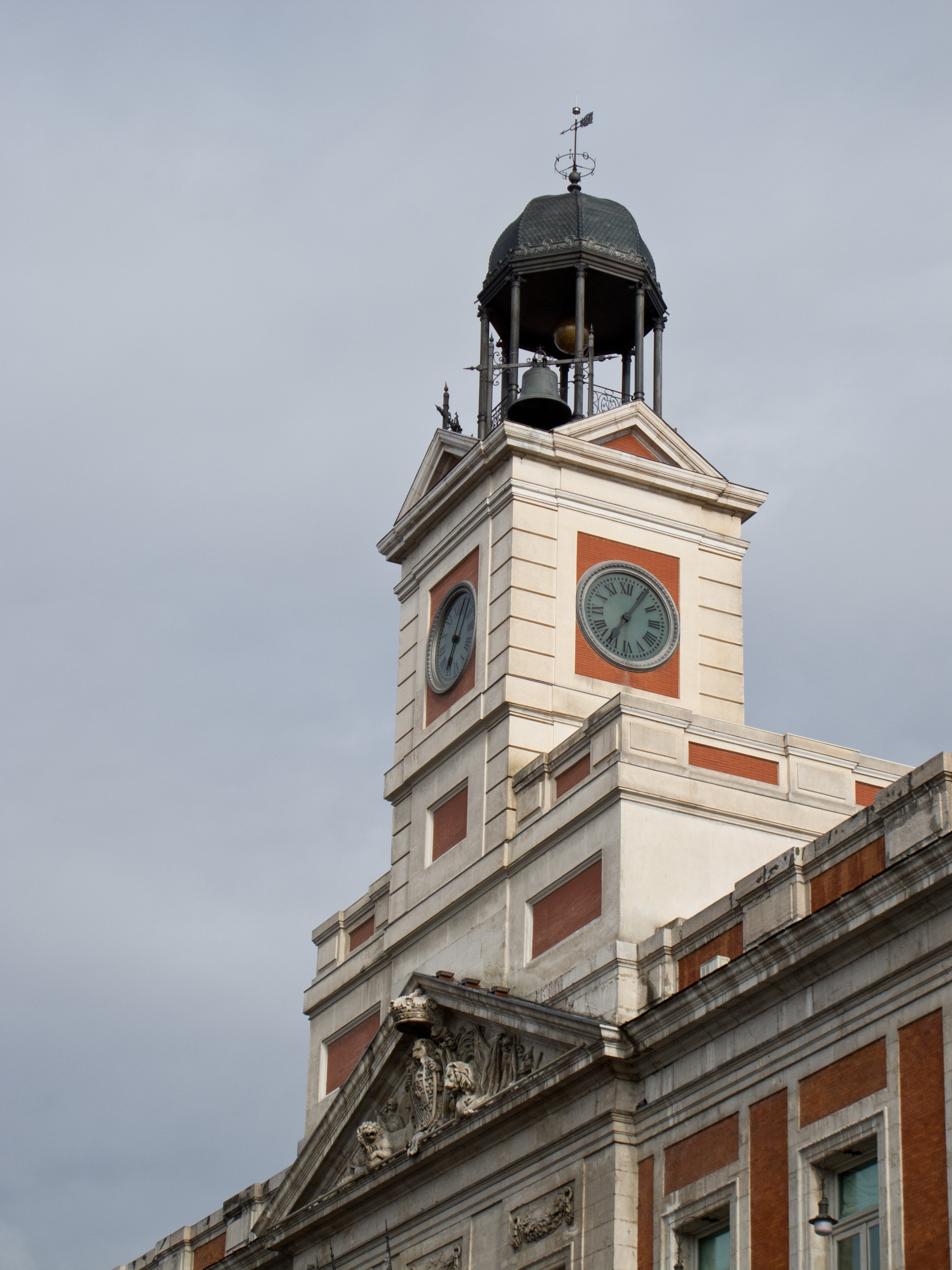
Royal House of the Post Office clock tower, Puerta del Sol, Madrid

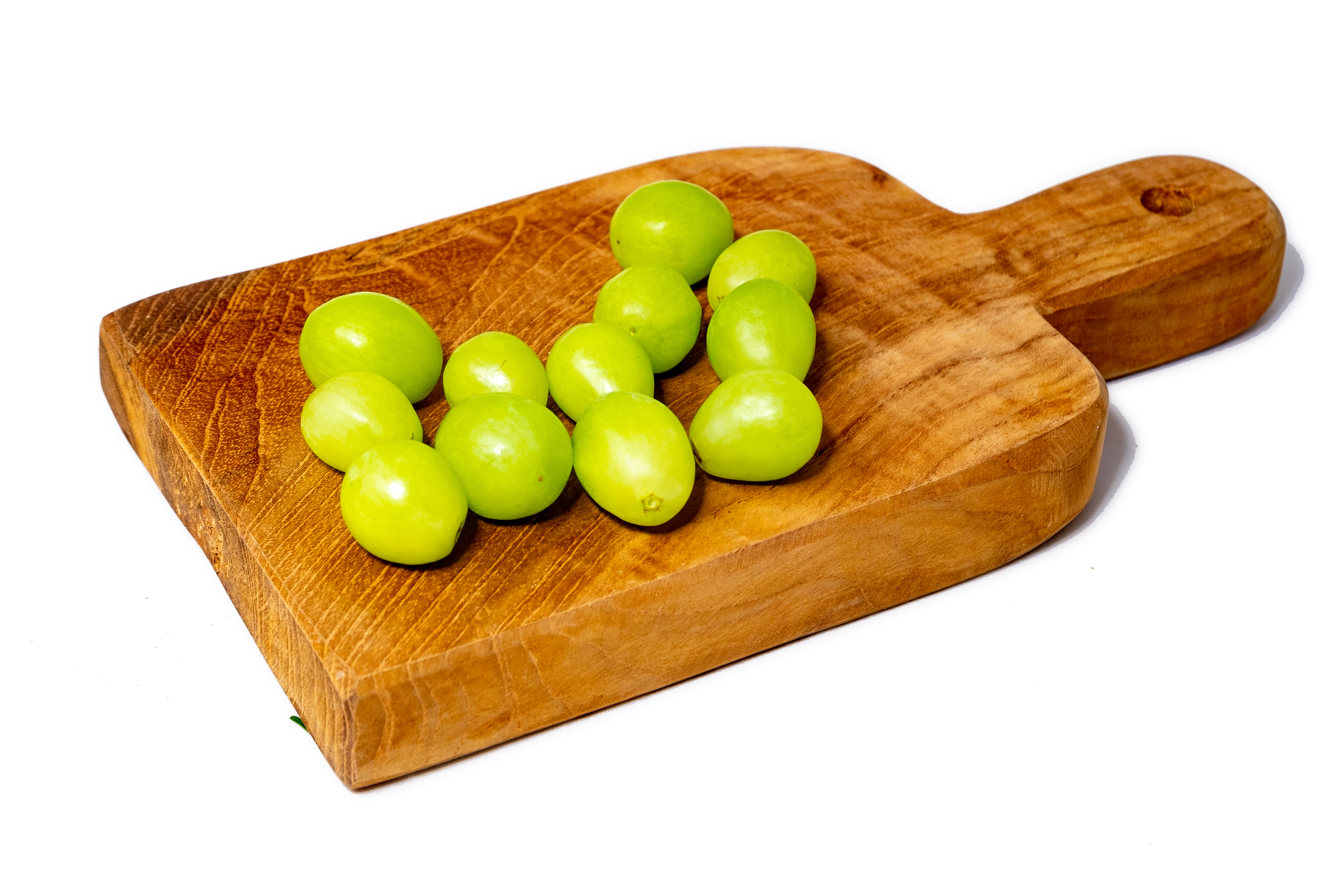
The twelve grapes ready to be eaten

The Twelve Grapes (Spanish: las doce uvas (de la suerte), lit. 'the twelve grapes (of luck)') is a Spanish tradition that consists of eating a grape with each of the twelve clock bell strikes at midnight of 31 December to welcome the New Year. Each grape and clock bell strike represents each of the coming twelve months.

This tradition dates back from at least 1895, but was greatly popularized in 1909. In December of that year, some Alicantese vine growers spread this custom to encourage grape sales due to overproduction during an excellent harvest. According to the tradition, eating the Twelve Grapes leads to a year of good luck and prosperity. In some areas, this practice was also believed to ward off witches and evil in general, although today it is mostly followed as a tradition to celebrate and welcome the New Year.

There are two types of places where people gather to eat the grapes: at home with family members after Nochevieja dinner, or in the main squares around the country. The most famous is where the tradition started, the Puerta del Sol in Madrid. The Twelve Grapes are closely related to the time ball and clock of the Royal House of the Post Office in Puerta del Sol, from where the change of year is broadcast on all major national television networks and radio stations, with television broadcasting beginning in 1962 on Televisión Española.

== Other countries ==
The Twelve Grapes have also been adopted in places with a broad cultural relation with Spain, such as the Philippines, Latin American and Caribbean countries, as well as Hispanic communities in countries such as the United States. This tradition is part of the Hispanic Christmas festivities. It is also done by some Jamaican locals.

Observed in the following:

- Andorra
- Argentina
- Brazil
- Colombia
- Costa Rica
- Cuba
- Dominican Republic
- Ecuador
- Mexico
- Nicaragua
- Peru
- Philippines
- Puerto Rico
- Serbia
- Uruguay
- Venezuela
