= Tailored Films =

Irish film studio, cinema and television production company

- Type: Limited Company
- Industry: Film; Television
- Founded: 2006; 20 years ago
- Founder: Ruth Treacy; Julianne Forde
- Headquarters: Dublin, Ireland
- Key people: Ruth Treacy; Julianne Forde
- Products: Feature films; Television series
- Website: tailoredfilms.ie

Tailored Films is an Irish cinema and television production company with 6 feature films and 10 TV series completed to date.

The company was established in 2006 by National Film Graduates Ruth Treacy and Julianne Forde, with a TV slate initially focusing on live-action children's series for the Irish state broadcaster RTÉ and a predominantly genre-skewed feature film slate. In recent years, the company has become more eclectic in genre.

The company often co-produces with or arranges funding from Irish governmental organizations such as Screen Ireland, Coimisiún na Meán, and RTÉ, as well as European funding bodies such as Creative Europe.

== TV Productions ==
Tailored Films produced several live-action children's series for RTÉ before embarking on the larger scale Irish-Canadian-Belgian co-production Louise Lives Large; a young adult drama centered on a teenaged cancer survivor. The series is RTÉ's biggest-ever drama commission for young people. Louise Lives Large premiered on RTÉ in April 2024 and later became the number one show on Canadian station Family Channel.

Tailored Films have also produced three series of German crime series Der Irland-Krimi with Good Friends Filmproduktions GmbH for ARD. The series is distributed by Beta Film and has proved popular with German audiences. Der Irland-Krimi stars Grimme Prize winner Désirée Nosbusch as a criminal psychologist solving murder mysteries in a coastal Irish town.

== Film Productions ==
In 2012, their first feature film, Irish-Swedish-UK co-production Stitches (written by Conor McMahon and David O'Brien, and directed by Conor McMahon) was produced alongside Fantastic Films and stars Ross Noble as the eponymous 'Stitches' the clown. The film screened at many festivals internationally before winning the Midnight X-treme prize at Sitges International Film Festival , as well as Best Death at Film4 Frightfest.

In 2017, their second feature film, The Lodgers (written by David Turpin and directed by Brian O'Malley), premiered at the Toronto International Film Festival and won many international awards including Best Actress and Best Special Effects at Fancine Festival de Cine Fantastico, Best VFX at the Irish Film and TV Academy Awards and Best Film at the Molins de Rei Horror Film Festival. At the "Molins de Rei Horror Film Festival", The Lodgers won the Jury Prize for "Best Film". The film was released theatrically in 23 countries, sold to 191 territories and also secured a large worldwide rights deal with Netflix. The film stars Charlotte Vega, Bill Milner, and Eugene Simon.

In 2020, their third feature film The Winter Lake (written by David Turpin and directed by Phil Sheerin), premiered at Galway Film Fleadh and won several awards at the Richard Harris International Film Festival. The film stars Anson Boon, Emma Mackey, Charlie Murphy and Michael McElhatton.

In 2021, their fourth feature film Let the Wrong One In (written and directed by Conor McMahon) premiered at Fantastic Fest in Austin, Texas on 24 September 2021 before releasing to Irish cinemas in 2023. Let the Wrong One In won Best Visual Effects at the 2021 Screamfest Horror Film Festival and was nominated for the Discovery Award at the 2022 Dublin International Film Festival. Conor McMahon was nominated for Best Director and Best Script at the 19th Irish Film & Television Awards. The film stars Karl Rice, Eoin Duffy, Hilda Fay, Lisa Haskins and Anthony Head.

In 2024, their fifth feature film, Irish-Canadian-Danish co-production The Apprentice had its world premiere at the 77th Cannes Film Festival on May 20, 2024, in competition for the Palme d'Or. The film is a biographical historical drama film directed by Ali Abbasi and written by Gabriel Sherman. Starring Sebastian Stan as Donald Trump, the film charts Trump's ascent as a real estate businessman in New York in the 1970s and 80s under the tutelage of right-wing lawyer and political fixer Roy Cohn, played by Jeremy Strong. The film also stars Maria Bakalova as Ivana Trump, and Martin Donovan as Fred Trump Sr. The Apprentice received significant press attention in the lead-up to Trump's 2024 presidential campaign.

Also in 2024, their sixth feature film, Irish-UK-Belgian co-production Bring Them Down (written and directed by Christopher Andrews in his directorial debut) was announced to premiere at the 2024 Toronto International Film Festival. The revenge thriller film stars Barry Keoghan, Christopher Abbott, Paul Ready, Colm Meaney, Nora-Jane Noone and Susan Lynch. Mubi are distributing the film.
