= Let Us Prey (disambiguation) =

Let Us Prey is an album by English stoner metal band Electric Wizard.

Let Us Prey may also refer to:

- Let Us Prey (film), a horror film directed by Brian O'Malley
- Let Us Prey, an album by Sol Invictus (band)
- "Let Us Prey", a song by Mötley Crüe from the album Generation Swine
- "Let Us Prey", a song by Overkill from the album Necroshine

== See also ==
- Let Us Pray, an album by Vital Remains
