= Brian O'Malley (director) =

Irish film director

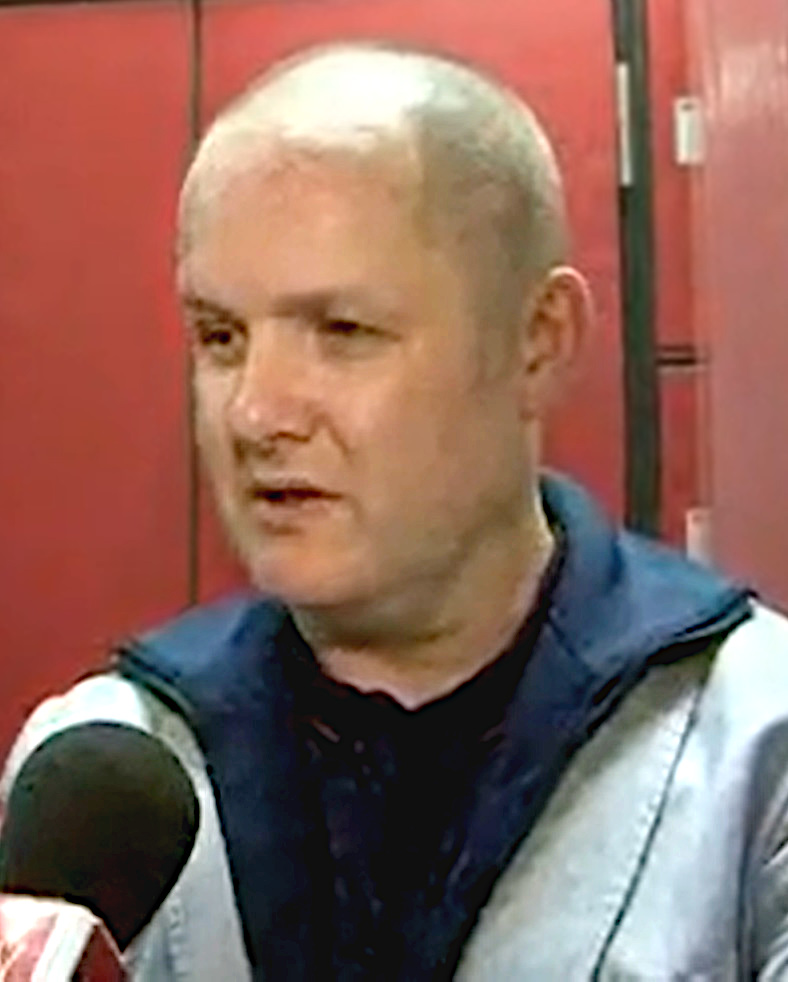
- O'Malley at JDIFF 2011
- Born: Ireland
- Known for: That Dirty Black Bag (2022 TV Series) The Lodgers (2017 film) Let us Prey (2015 film)

Brian O'Malley is an Irish film director known for the "spaghetti Western" TV series That Dirty Black Bag which aired on AMC+ in 2022, the Paramount+ TV Series The Ex-Wife which aired in late 2022, and the feature films The Lodgers and Let Us Prey.

== Career ==
=== Early career ===
O'Malley studied fine art, specialising in sculpture, before moving into music video and short film direction. He began directing TV commercials in 2001 before moving into drama.

He wrote and directed the short films Crossing Salween (2010) and Screwback (2005). In 2005 he won the Hartley Merrill Screenwriting award for his feature films script SISK, co-written with Terry McMahon and Mark O'Rowe.

=== Later career ===
O'Malley is also known for the gothic horror movies Let Us Prey and The Lodgers.

Let Us Prey, starring Liam Cunningham and Pollyanna McIntosh, won the Méliès d'Argent for Best European Fantastic Feature Film at its world premiere at the Brussels International Fantastic Film Festival in 2014.

His second feature film The Lodgers, starring Charlotte Vega, Bill Milner, Moe Dunford, Deirdre O'Kane and David Bradley is an elegantly gothic ghost story set in rural Ireland in 1920, premiered at TIFF 2017 and was released theatrically February 23rd 2018.

He also directed 4 episodes of That Dirty Black Bag, the AMC+ Spaghetti Western TV series produced by MediawanEU Palomar and Bron Studios. The 8-part series, shot in Italy, Spain and Morocco in 2020/2021 was created by Mauro Aragoni. Stars Douglas Booth, Dominic Cooper, Niv Sultan, Guido Caprino, Rose Williams, Christian Cooke, Paterson Joseph, Zoe Boyle, Ivan Shaw, Eugene Brave Rock, Daniel Caltagirone, Anna Chancellor, Aidan Gillen and Travis Fimmel.

He was series director for a 4-part thriller The Ex-Wife for Paramount+ starring Celine Buckens, Tom Mison, Janet Montgomery and Jordan Stephens, written by Catherine Steadman, based on the book by Jess Ryder.

== Filmography ==
- 2025: Nine Bodies in a Mexican Morgue (TV Series) - Director
- 2024: The Cuckoo (TV Series) - Director
- 2022: The Ex-Wife (TV Series) - Director
- 2022: That Dirty Black Bag (TV Series) - Director
- 2022: The News (Short) - Director
- 2017: The Lodgers - Director
- 2014: Let Us Prey - Director
- 2010: Crossing Salween (Short) - Writer and Director
- 2005: Screwback (Short) - Writer and Director
