= The Last Night of Sandra M. =

- Theatrical release poster
- Spanish: La última noche de Sandra M.
- Directed by: Borja de la Vega
- Screenplay by: Borja de la Vega
- Produced by: Toni Espinosa; Maria Àngels Amorós; Ricardo Gómez; Borja de la Vega
- Starring: Claudia Traisac; Georgina Amorós; Nicolás Illoro; Pep Ambrós; Beatriz Arjona; Olaya Caldera; Rafa Castejón; Manu Imizcoz; Ramon Pujol; Bruno Sevilla; Oriol Tarrasón; Nuria Prims
- Cinematography: Martín Urrea
- Edited by: Pedro Collantes; Jorge García Soto
- Music by: Marc Durandeau
- Production companies: Paciencia y Barajar; TonedMedia
- Distributed by: Filmin
- Release dates: 17 March 2023 (Málaga); 15 December 2023 (Spain)
- Country: Spain
- Language: Spanish

The Last Night of Sandra M. (Spanish: La última noche de Sandra M.) is a 2023 Spanish psychological drama film directed by Borja de la Vega which stars Claudia Traisac as Sandra Mozarowsky. Georgina Amorós and Nicolás Illoro appear in supporting roles.

== Plot ==
The plot concerns about the last day of the life of popular destape actress Sandra Mozarowsky, who died on in mysterious circumstances after falling from a balcony on 23 August 1977.

== Cast ==
- Claudia Traisac as Sandra Mozarowsky
- Georgina Amorós as Inma
- Núria Prims as madre de Sandra ('Sandra's mother')
- Pep Ambròs as fotógrafo de prensa ('press photographer')
- Manu Imizcoz
- Beatriz Arjona
- Bruno Sevilla
- Olaya Caldera as Cristina
- Nicolás Illoro
- Rafa Castejón
- Ramon Pujol

== Production ==
The film is a Paciencia y Barajar and Toned Media production. Toni Espinosa, Maria Àngels Amorós, Ricardo Gómez, and Borja de la Vega took over production duties. Shooting locations included Barcelona.

== Release ==
The film was presented in the ZonaZine section of the 26th Málaga Film Festival on 17 March 2023. Distributed by Filmin, it was released theatrically in Spain on 15 December 2023.

== Reception ==
Toni Vall of Cinemanía rated the film 4 out of 5 stars, writing in the verdict about a "thrilling creation of Claudia Traisac, a delightful performance".

Quim Casas of El Periódico de Catalunya rated the film 2 out of 5 stars, considering than the first part is when the film works best, with the second part, working as a sort of "hallucinatory nightmare" not faring that well.

== See also ==
- List of Spanish films of 2023
