= The Bond (2024 film) =

- Theatrical release poster
- Spanish: La fianza
- Directed by: Gonzalo Perdomo-Tafur
- Screenplay by: Andrés Martorell; Gonzalo Perdomo-Tafur
- Produced by: Mateo Bettinger; William de Marsangy; Juan Víctor Sumarriva
- Starring: Juana Acosta; Israel Elejalde; Julián Román
- Cinematography: César Pérez
- Edited by: Azucena Baños
- Music by: Lucas Vidal
- Production company: La Fianza La Película AIE
- Distributed by: Syldavia Cinema
- Release dates: November 2024 (FICAL); 5 December 2024 (Spain)
- Country: Spain
- Language: Spanish

The Bond (Spanish: La fianza) is a 2024 Spanish thriller film directed by Gonzalo Perdomo-Tafur starring Juana Acosta, Israel Elejalde and Julián Román.

== Plot ==
The plot tracks the developments taking place after Ana, a Colombian woman wanting to fit in Madrilenian society receives the visit of Walter, a fellow Colombian asking for her husband Ricardo.

== Cast ==
- Juana Acosta as Ana
- Israel Elejalde as Ricardo
- Julián Román as Walter

== Production ==
The film is a La Fianza La Película AIE production.

== Release ==
The film was presented at the Almería International Film Festival (FICAL) in November 2024. Distributed by Syldavia Cinema, it was released theatrically in Spain on 5 December 2024. It received a theatrical release in Colombia in April 2025. In November 2025, it was reported that the film's Latin American rights had been acquired by HBO Max.

== Reception ==
Carmen L. Lobo of La Razón rated the film 3 out of 5 stars writing that it offers "certainly humorous moments" and "several moments of tension", all of it "sprinkled with the Cali bravado".

Sergio F. Pinilla of Cinemanía rated the film 3 out of 5 stars, writing that the mashup of thriller and costumbrista satire "finds moments of inspiration that do not end up consolidating".

== Soundtrack ==
"Selva Negra" by Peruvian singer-songwriter LaLa plays at the end of the movie and during credits.

== See also ==
- List of Spanish films of 2024
