= Claudia Traisac =

Spanish actress (born 1992)

- Traisac in 2026
- Born: Claudia Hernández Blas; 14 December 1992 (age 33); Leganés, Community of Madrid, Spain
- Other name: Claudia Hernández
- Occupation: Actress
- Years active: 2004–present
- Partner: Josh Hutcherson (2013–present)

Claudia Hernández Blas (born 14 December 1992), professionally known as Claudia Traisac, is a Spanish actress. She is best known for her roles in Escobar: Paradise Lost (2014) and Cuéntame (2006–2018).

== Life and career ==
She made her feature film debut as an actress in The 7th Day. She starred in the musicals Hoy no me puedo levantar at the Teatro Coliseum, and La llamada at the Teatro Lara in Madrid.

Since 2013 she has been in a relationship with actor Josh Hutcherson.

== Filmography ==
=== Film ===
Year	Title	Role	Notes	Ref.
2004	El 7º día (The 7th Day)	Young Isabel	Feature film debut	
2009	Amanecer en Asia	Claudia		
2015	Escobar: Paradise Lost	Maria		
2017	La llamada (Holy Camp!)	Female camper	Cameo	
2023	La última noche de Sandra M. (The Last Night of Sandra M.)	Sandra Mozarowsky		
2023	Teresa	Juana Juárez		
2025	Sigue mi voz (Follow My Voice)	Kamila		
2026	Una familia (A Family)	Clara		

=== Television ===
Year	Title	Role	Notes
2004	El inquilino	Yoli	Main role; 13 episodes
2005	Ke no!	Amaia	Main role; 7 episodes
2006	Atropello		Television film
2006–2018	Cuéntame cómo pasó	Julia	Recurring role; 33 episodes
2008	La bella Otero	Young Carolina	Television mini-series
2008–2009	18	Laura Valencia	Main role; 21 episodes
2009–2010	Amar en tiempos revueltos	Pilar	Recurring role; 6 episodes
2011	Homicidios	Carolina	Episode: "La casa donde habitan los monstrous"
2012	Carmina	Young Belen	Television mini-series
2012	Rescatando a Sara	Laura	Guest role; 2 episodes
2012–2013	Luna, el misterio de Calenda	Silvia Elías	Recurring role; 18 episodes
2014	Aída	Clara	Episode: "Con balas y a lo loco"
2014	El príncipe	Silvia	Episode: "Fe ciega"
2015–2017	Apaches	Vicky	Main role; 12 episodes
2016–2019	Paquita Salas	Clara	Recurring role; 3 episodes
2016	La sonata del silencio	Elena	Main role; 9 episodes
2018–2020	Vivir sin permiso (Unauthorized Living)	Lara	Main role; 23 episodes
2019	Alta Mar (High Seas)	Casandra Lenormand	Guest role; 8 episodes
