= A Family (2026 Spanish-Peruvian film) =

- Teaser poster
- Spanish: Una familia
- Directed by: Ricardo Gómez
- Written by: Ricardo Gómez
- Produced by: Diego Betancor; Carlos Montero; Félix Tusell Sánchez
- Starring: Víctor Lite; Claudia Traisac; Patrick Criado; Ana Wagener
- Cinematography: Sara Gallego Grau
- Edited by: Miguel A. Trudu
- Music by: Karin Zielinski
- Production companies: El Desorden Crea; Lágrima Films; Estela Films; Tondero; Nuestro Ayer AIE
- Distributed by: Filmax
- Release dates: 24 October 2026 (Seminci); 19 February 2027 (Spain)
- Countries: Spain; Peru
- Language: Spanish

A Family (Spanish: Una familia) is a 2026 drama film directed by Ricardo Gómez (in his directorial debut feature). It stars Víctor Lite, Claudia Traisac, Patrick Criado, and Ana Wagener.

It premiered at the 71st Valladolid International Film Festival on 24 October 2026 ahead of its Spanish theatrical release by Filmax on 19 February 2027.

== Plot ==
Set in 1992, 1995, and 2005, the plot follows a child actor, a mother in a toxic relationship, and an immate on day release.

== Cast ==
- Víctor Lite as Pablo
- Claudia Traisac as Clara
- Patrick Criado as Enrique
- Ana Wagener as Consuelo
- Claudio Villarrubia
- Ismael Martínez
- María Moreno
- Javed Khan

== Production ==
Una familia is a Spanish-Peruvian production by El Desorden Crea, Lágrima Films, Estela Films, Tondero, and Nuestro Ayer AIE, with the participation of RTVE and Movistar Plus+ and backing from ICAA, the Madrid regional administration and Ayuntamiento de Madrid. The film was shot in 16 mm by Sara Gallego Grau, AEC, using an Arriflex 416 camera and various sets of lenses (including Laowa Nanomorph, Arri Ultra Prime, and Arri Ultra 16). Shooting locations in the Community of Madrid included Collado Villalba, Gómez's hometown.

== Release ==
Traisac, Lite, Gómez, Wagener, and Criado attending the 2026 Seminci.

A Family was presented at a RTVE gala of the 71st Valladolid International Film Festival (Seminci) on 24 October 2026. Filmax secured Spanish theatrical distribution. It is scheduled to be released theatrically in Spain on 19 February 2027.

== See also ==
- List of Spanish films of 2027
