= David Bermejo =

Spanish director

David Bermejo (born 1972) is a Spanish screenwriter and television producer.

== Biography ==
David Bermejo is the creator, with Basque filmmaker Aitor Gabilondo, of the Netflix television series Unauthorized Living, then of the Telecinco series Wrong Side of the Tracks, with Spanish actor José Coronado.

== Television ==
- 2007 : La familia Mata
- 2010 : Los hombres de Paco

- 2012: Luna, el misterio de Calenda
- 2018: Unauthorized Living
- 2022 : Wrong Side of the Tracks
