= Luna, el misterio de Calenda =

Spanish television series

- Genre: Mystery; Supernatural fiction Horror
- Created by: Laura Belloso; David Bermejo
- Country of origin: Spain
- Original language: Spanish
- No. of seasons: 2
- No. of episodes: 20

Production
- Executive producers: Daniel Écija; Laura Belloso
- Production company: Globomedia

Original release
- Network: Antena 3
- Release: 10 April 2012 – 10 April 2013

Luna, el misterio de Calenda is a Spanish mystery and horror television series. Produced by Globomedia for Antena 3, it aired from 2012 to 2013 on the latter channel.

== Premise ==
Sara (Belén Rueda), a judge, moves with her teenage daughter Leire (Lucía Guerrero) to a remote mountain village seeking to resume her marriage with David Costa (Leonardo Sbaraglia), a law enforcement officer who after ten years separated from Sara has reportedly relocated to the area. But David disappears. Upon her arrival to Calenda, Sara finds out the mystery around the village is connected to gruesome legends, some of them related to lycanthropy.

Meanwhile, Leire feels attracted to the mysterious Joel (Álvaro Cervantes) and also becomes a close friend of Vera (Macarena García), herself infatuated by Nacho (Fran Perea) a Guardia Civil officer several years her senior.

== Cast ==
- Belén Rueda as Sara Cruz, a judge.
- Lucía Guerrero as Leire (Sara's daughter).
- Álvaro Cervantes as Joel.
- Macarena García as Vera, Carola's daughter.
- Daniel Grao as Raúl Pando, a Guardia Civil agent, married to Carola.
- Fran Perea as Nacho, a Guardia Civil agent.
- Olivia Molina as Olivia, the court clerk.
- Belén López as Carola, the village's bar owner.
- Marc Martínez as Joel's father.
- Àlex Maruny as Pablo, Vera's brother.
- Claudia Traisac as Silvia Elías, the Mayor's daughter.
- Gorka Aguinagalde as Francisco Elías, Mayor of Calenda, Manuel and Silvia's father.
- Leonardo Sbaraglia as David Costa, Sara's husband.
- María Cantuel as Sonia, a rookie police officer.
- César Goldi as Basilio.
- Carlos Cuevas as Tomás, Olivia's son.
- Antonio Durán as Gerardo, the janitor of the high school.
- Daniel Ortiz as Salva, a high school teacher.

Introduced in season 2

- Roberto Álamo as Diego, Vera and Pablo's biological father.
- Estefanía de los Santos as Marcela, a neighbor of Calenda.
- Álvaro de Luna as Ernesto Cruz, Sara's father.
- Álex Hernández, a troubling teenager.

== Production and release ==
Created by Laura Belloso and David Bermejo and produced by Globomedia, Laura Belloso and Daniel Écija were credited as executive producers. The series was shot in a 1,300 m^{2} indoor set, with outdoor scenes primarily shot in Candelario (province of Salamanca), and additional outdoor shooting locations in Las Navas del Marqués (province of Ávila), and a forest in the province of Segovia. The first season consisted of 12 episodes.

The series premiered on 10 April 2012. The series returned with an 8-episode second season on 13 February 2013. The non-renovation of the series for a third season was determined before airing finished. The season finale aired on 10 April 2013.

Series	Episodes	Originally released			Viewers	Share (%)	Ref.
Series	Episodes	First released	Last released	Network	Viewers	Share (%)	Ref.
1	12	16 April 2012	26 December 2012	Antena 3	2,789,000	15.2	
2	8	13 February 2013	10 April 2013	Antena 3	2,300,000	12.9	

=== Season 1 ===
This is a caption
No. overall	No. in season	Title	Viewers	Original release date	Share (%)
1	1	"La leyenda"	3,514,000	10 April 2012	19.2
2	2	"Sacrificio"	3,234,000	17 April 2012	16.8
3	3	"Sangre"	3,005,000	24 April 2012	15.8
4	4	"El monstruo"	2,606,000	1 May 2012	14.2
5	5	"Luna llena"	2,678,000	8 May 2012	14.7
6	6	"Desaparecida"	2,529,000	15 May 2012	13.9
7	7	"Huesos"	2,713,000	22 May 2012	14.7
8	8	"El odio"	2,693,000	29 May 2012	14.3
9	9	"Secretos"	2,558,000	5 June 2012	14.1
10	10	"Culpable"	2,750,000	12 June 2012	14.8
11	11	"Mentiras"	2,533,000	19 June 2012	14.7
12	12	"El aullido"	2,664,000	26 June 2012	15.9

=== Season 2 ===
This is a caption
No. overall	No. in season	Title	Viewers	Original release date	Share (%)
13	1	"La maldición"	2,402,000	13 February 2013	13.6
13	2	"Pacto de silencio"	2,358,000	20 February 2013	13.4
15	3	"Las minas de plata"	2,416,000	27 February 2013	12.9
16	4	"Corazonadas"	2,349,000	6 March 2013	13.7
17	5	"El confidente"	2,187,000	13 March 2013	12.0
18	6	"La noche de la luna nueva"	2,198,000	20 March 2013	12.9
19	7	"Atrapados"	2,107,000	3 April 2013	11.6
20	8	"Para siempre"	2,383,000	10 April 2013	13.3
