= Unauthorized Living =

2018 Spanish-language television series

- Vivir sin permiso
- Genre: Drama
- Created by: Aitor Gabilondo; David Bermejo
- Starring: José Coronado; Álex González; Claudia Traisac
- Country of origin: Spain
- Original language: Spanish
- No. of seasons: 2
- No. of episodes: 23

Production
- Running time: 75 min.

Original release
- Network: Telecinco
- Release: September 24, 2018 – March 16, 2020

Unauthorized Living (Spanish: Vivir sin permiso) is a Spanish-language television series created by Aitor Gabilondo and David Bermejo and starring José Coronado, Álex González, Claudia Traisac. The plot revolves around Nemo Bandeira (Coronado) who has a businessman facade, but is really a drug lord. When Nemo is diagnosed with Alzheimer's disease around his sixtieth birthday, he keeps it a secret and starts to think about who might be his successor.

It was released on September 24, 2018, on Telecinco and is being streamed on Netflix in February 2020.

== Plot ==
The plot of ‘Unauthorized Living’/ ‘Vivir sin Permiso’ follows the story of Nemo Bandeira, a drug lord with a clean businessman facade, who is diagnosed with Alzheimer's disease. Although he tries to keep the news away from his family it becomes difficult while he tries to assess who his successor might be. Season 1 of the show revolves around Bandeira's challenges within his family and his business network. Season 2 will see how his second-in-command tries to steal the business empire from its rightful heir, resulting in betrayal, violence and mayhem in Bandeira's life.

== Cast ==
- José Coronado as Nemo Bandeira: A rich drug lord who is diagnosed with Alzheimer's disease.
- Álex González as Mario Mendoza: Raised from childhood by Nemo and now his lawyer, he plots to be Nemo’s successor.
- Claudia Traisac as Lara Balarés / Lara Bandeira: Nemo’s estranged and illegitimate daughter
- Luis Zahera as Ferro: a tough, short-tempered friend of Nemo who does most of his dirty work.
- Pilar Castro as Chon Moliner: Nemo’s wife, and mother of Carlos and Nina
- Àlex Monner as Carlos Bandeira: Nemo’s gay son
- Giulia Charm as Nina Bandeira: Nemo’s diva daughter who has a crush on Mario
- Unax Ugalde as Malcom Souza, a lawyer and the Bandeira family's "accountant"; secretly spying on Lara for Nemo and the Bandeira family as a whole for Lago
- Héctor Arteaga as Opensea Employee
- Leonor Watling as Berta Moliner: Chon’s sister
- Ledicia Sola as Elisa: Mario's wife with mayoral aspirations
- Patrick Criado as Daniel Arteaga, Berta's stepson and lover
- Édgar Vittorino as Freddy, a Colombian hitman and close friend of Tigre
- Daniel Currás as Tigre, a rival druglord recently released from prison
- Xabier Deive as Adolfo Monterroso, a new cop with an obsessive vendetta against Nemo
- Ricardo Gómez as Alejandro Lamas, Carlos's boyfriend and Fidel Lamas's son
- Mercedes Castro as Carmiña, a maid for the Bandeira household
- Paula Morado as Inspectora Alen, a female cop and somewhat reluctant partner of Monterroso
- Javier Abad as Young Nemo
- Andrew Joseph Perez as Young Nemo
- Julius Cotter as Mr. Anderson
- Pol Monen as Exprés, Lara's boyfriend.
- Carlos Hipólito as Fidel Lamas, a former corrupt superintendent, who's incurred a large debt from his gambling addiction
- Fernando Morán as Alcalde Ramón Mosquera, a judge in Nemo's pocket
- Ruben Zamora as Germân Arteaga, Berta's husband and a druglord back in Mexico

== Release ==
Unauthorized Living was released on September 24, 2018, on Telecinco. The series finale aired on March 16, 2020.

== Awards and nominations ==
Year	Award	Category	Nominee(s)	Result	Ref.
2018	6th MiM Series Awards	Best Drama Series		Nominated	
2018	6th MiM Series Awards	Best Drama Actor	José Coronado	Won	
2018	6th MiM Series Awards	Best Screenplay	Aitor Gabilondo, Joan Barbero, Antonio Hernández Centeno, Darío Madrona, Guadalupe Rilova, Olga Salvador and Mauricio Romero	Nominated	
2020	29th Actors and Actresses Union Awards	Best TV Actress in a Minor Performance	Leonor Watling	Nominated	

== Remake ==
In March 2022, media reported the development of an Italian remake by Canale 5 directed by and starring Claudio Amendola, Il Patriarca.
