= The Replacement (2021 film) =

- Theatrical release poster
- Spanish: El sustituto
- Directed by: Óscar Aibar
- Written by: Óscar Aibar; María Luisa Calderón
- Produced by: Gerardo Herrero; Pedro Pastor
- Starring: Ricardo Gómez; Vicky Luengo; Pere Ponce
- Cinematography: Álex de Pablo
- Edited by: Teresa Font
- Production companies: Tornasol; Voramar Films S.L.; Isaba Producciones Cinematográficas A.I.E.; Entre Chien et Loup
- Distributed by: Karma Films
- Release dates: 7 June 2021 (Málaga); 29 October 2021 (Spain)
- Countries: Spain; Belgium
- Language: Spanish
- Budget: c. 2.8 million €

The Replacement (Spanish: El sustituto) is a 2021 Spanish–Belgian thriller drama film directed by Óscar Aibar. It stars Ricardo Gómez, Vicky Luengo and Pere Ponce.

== Plot ==
It is set in 1982. A police officer from Madrid moves to the coast. He gets involved in an investigation that takes him to a community of nazis enjoying their retirement in the Costa Blanca.

== Cast ==
- Ricardo Gómez as Andrés Expósito
- Vicky Luengo as Eva Vidal
- Pere Ponce as Colombo
- Pol López
- Joaquín Climent
- Nuria Herrero
- Frank Feys
- Susi Sánchez as current-day Eva
- Bruna Cusí as Raquel
- Guillermo Montesinos
- Hans-Peter Deppe

== Production ==
A joint Spain–Belgium co-production, The Replacement was produced by Tornasol, Voramar Films S.L., Isaba Producciones Cinematográficas A.I.E. and Entre Chien et Loup with the participation of RTVE, À Punt Media, the collaboration of Amazon Prime Video and support from ICAA and ICV Generalitat Valenciana. The film was written by Óscar Aibar (the director) alongside María Luisa Calderón. The crew was completed by the likes of Álex de Pablo (DOP), Uxua Castelló (art direction), and Teresa Font (editing). It was shot in Dénia and other locations across the Valencia region. Filming began by mid September 2020.

The film had a budget over €2.8 million.

== Release ==
The Replacement was presented at the 24th Málaga Film Festival on 7 June 2021, as part of the festival's official selection. It was also screened at the 36th Mostra de València. Distributed by Karma Films, the film was theatrically released in Spain on 29 October 2021.

== Reception ==
Pere Vall of Fotogramas gave the film 3 out of 5 stars, considering it to be "an austere and impeccable recreation of 1980s Spain", highlighting Pere Ponce's performance. Beatriz Martínez of El Periódico de Catalunya gave it 3 out of 5 stars, deeming it a "good thriller", but also a reflection on "the miseries of our times" and the rise of the far right. Raquel Hernández Luján of HobbyConsolas gave the film 60 out of 100 points, praising the good recreation of the 1980s (owing to production design and art direction) while negatively assessing the "overly stilted" performances as well as the "clumsy" and "predictable" resolution. Carmen L. Lobo of La Razón gave it 3 out of 5 stars, writing that it was "superbly set", and that it constituted "a sober, dry and razor-sharp" film. Anton Merikaetxebarria of El Correo gave it 2 out of 3 stars, considering it to be a "different, timely and interesting film".

== Awards and nominations ==
Year	Award	Category	Nominee(s)	Result	Ref.
2022	9th Feroz Awards	Best Main Actor in a Film	Ricardo Gómez	Nominated	
2022	9th Feroz Awards	Best Supporting Actor in a Film	Pere Ponce	Nominated	

== See also ==
- List of Spanish films of 2021
