= Michelle Calvó =

Spanish actress

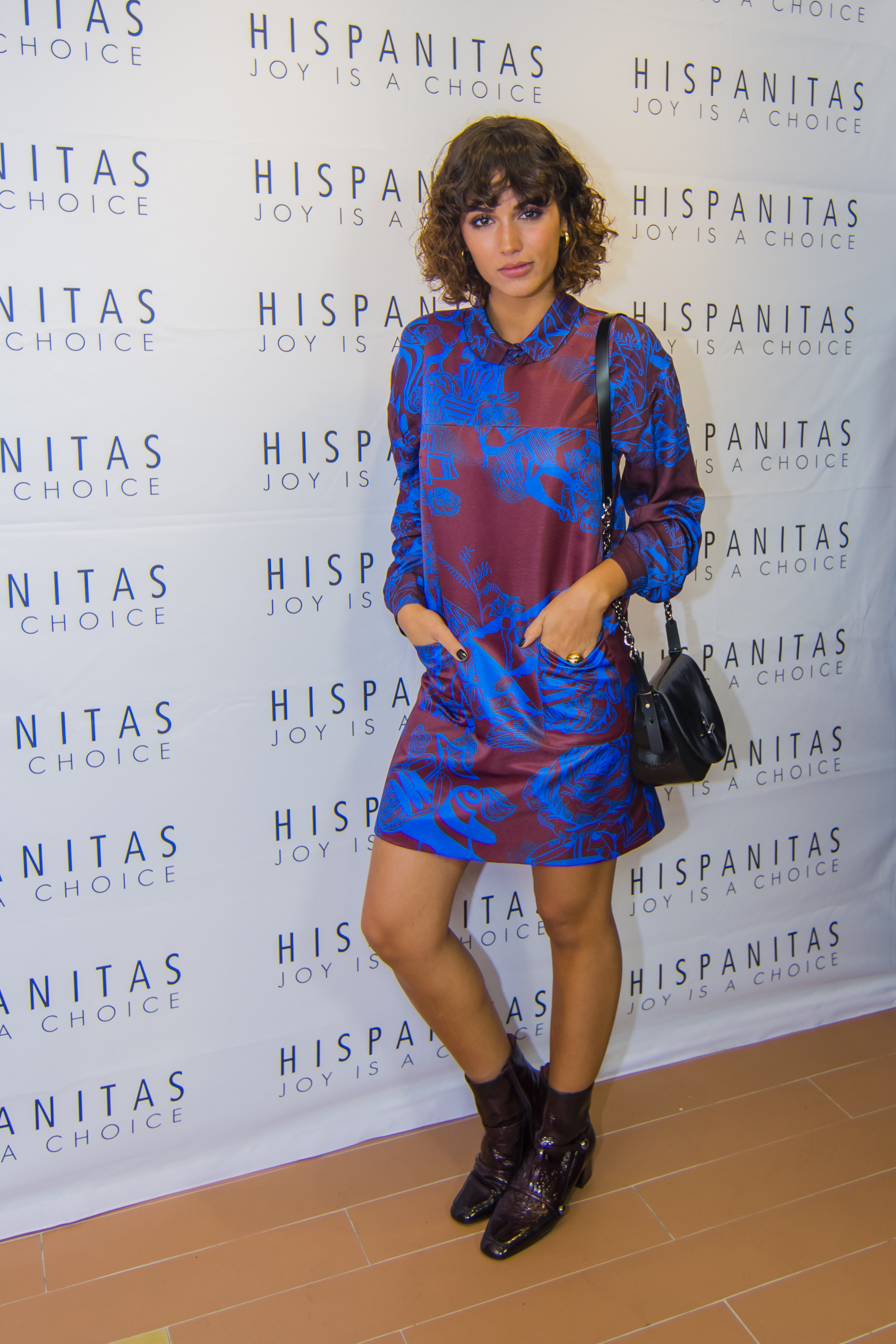
- Michelle Calvó in 2016
- Born: Michelle Calvó Pedreira; 19 September 1991 (age 34); Madrid, Spain
- Occupation: Actress
- Years active: 2012-present

Michelle Calvó Pedreira, better known as Michelle Calvó, (Madrid, September 19, 1991) is a Spanish actress known for her role as Eli in the film El club de los incomprendidos and for playing Sofía Contreras in Amar es para siempre. In 2019 she played Paula Campillo in the series Secretos de estado.

== Biography ==
Michelle Calvó, born in Madrid and raised in Tenerife, studied at the Juan Codina acting school and later took casting and acting courses with Juan León, Jordi Frades, Eva Leira, Yolanda Serrano, Andrés Cuenca and Álvaro Haro. More recently she has taken an acting and audiovisual training course with Sara Torres. She was a member of the School's theater group for five years.

Michelle has played episodic roles in series such as Toledo, cruce de destinos or Aída and has participated in numerous music videos and short films, such as Candela, for which she received the award for best performance and the audience award at the Ibicine Festival. His popularity, however, came from the hand of El club de los incomprendidos. Later, in 2015 she signed on as the protagonist in Amar es para siempre for its fourth season.

In June 2017, she became known for her participation in the second season of Yo quisiera. In July 2017 she signed on as a collaborator of Zapeando, a program in which she participates occasionally. In addition, in October 2017 she began filming Secretos de Estado, the new series of Telecinco, alongside Miryam Gallego, Jesús Castro, Estefanía de los Santos and Miquel Fernández.

In 2020 she played in the premiere of Desaparecidos, produced by Plano a Plano and Telecinco alongside Maxi Iglesias, Elvira Minguez and Juan Echanove and participated in the Italian Gli orologi del diavolo.

In 2021, she was announced for the third season of Madres.Amor y vida, alongside Belén Rueda, Carmen Ruiz and Hiba Abouk, among others.

== Filmography ==
=== Cinema ===
Year	Title	Character	Directed by
2014	El club de los incomprendidos	Elisabeth	Carlos Sedes

=== Television ===
Year	Title	Channel	Character	Duration
2012	Toledo, cruce de destinos	Antena 3	Ligue de Fernando	1 episode
2013	Aída	Telecinco	Extra	1 episode
2014	Bienvenidos al Lolita	Antena 3	Carmen	1 episode
2014	Isabel	La 1	Dama de Flandes	1 episode
2015 - 2016	Amar es para siempre	Antena 3	Sofía Contreras Vázquez	254 episodes
2017	Zapeando	La Sexta	Herself - Collaborator	10 programs
2018	Yo quisiera	Divinity	Toni	40 episodes
2018	Cupido	Playz	Chloe	6 episodes
2018	Paquita Salas	Netflix	Herself	1 episode
2019	Los nuestros 2	Telecinco	Elena Ferrer	3 episodes
2019	Secretos de Estado	Telecinco	Paula Campillo Aguirre	13 episodes
2020	Los relojes del diablo	Rai 1 / Cuatro	Marisol Vizcaíno	4 episodes
2020–present	Desaparecidos	Telecinco and Prime Video	Sonia Ledesma	13 episodes
2021–present	Madres. Amor y vida	Telecinco and Prime Video	Camila Román	8 episodes
2023 - 2024	Entrevías	Telecinco	Dulce	15 episodes

=== Videoclips ===
- «No pide tanto, idiota», by Maldita Nerea (2015).
- «No saben de ti», by Andrés Suárez (2015).
- «Elévate», by Dan Silva.
- «Sopla el viento», by Pignoise.
- «Sigo escuchándote», by Josel Casas.
- «Ohe, Oha vas a soñar», by Sarah Sofìa.
