= Wrong Side of the Tracks (TV series) =

Spanish television series

- Spanish: Entrevías
- Genre: Drama; Thriller
- Created by: David Bermejo
- Starring: José Coronado; Nona Sobo; Luis Zahera
- Country of origin: Spain
- Original language: Spanish
- No. of seasons: 4
- No. of episodes: 32

Production
- Production companies: Mediaset España; Alea Studios

Original release
- Network: Telecinco
- Release: 1 February 2022

Wrong Side of the Tracks (Spanish: Entrevías) is a Spanish drama television series created by Aitor Gabilondo and David Bermejo, starring José Coronado, Nona Sobo and Luis Zahera that began airing on Telecinco on 1 February 2022.

== Premise ==
Set in Entrevías, the poorest neighborhood in Madrid, the series follows Tirso Abantos, a former soldier running a hardware store, whose monotonous daily routine is shaken when his unruly and rebellious adopted teenaged granddaughter Irene, of Vietnamese origin, along with her Colombian-immigrant boyfriend Nelson, agree to sell heroin from drug dealer Sandro. While the young couple had planned to sell the drugs and run off together, the plan goes wrong, and she is assumed to be violently raped by Sandro and his thugs. The truth comes out later in the series. Tirso then teams up with corrupt police officer Ezequiel to face up to the criminals in the neighborhood.

== Cast ==
=== Main cast ===
- José Coronado as Tirso Abantos, a retired "war hero" (while Spanish Army 3rd Company commander during NATO peacekeeping operations in Bosnia and Herzegovina) who now runs a hardware store, frustrated with the rampant crime and delinquency in his neighbourhood
- Luis Zahera as Ezequiel Fandiño, a street-savvy cop who tells Amanda that new crime bosses will always move in, while (somewhat) secretly using his work for Sandro to keep crime from being worse; protective of Gladys and Nelson
- Nona Sobo as Irene Sánchez Abantos, Tirso's 17-year-old (at series start) adopted Vietnamese granddaughter, who stole a kilo of heroin from crime boss Sandro
- Felipe Londoño as Nelson Gutiérrez, Irene's Colombian-born boyfriend
- Laura Ramos as Gladys, Nelson's Cuban mother who was lured to Spain with a job offer, then prostituted; close to Ezequiel since escaping the human traffickers
- Manolo Caro as Sanchís, Tirso's friend and former 3rd Company soldier, a drug addict who Tirso occasionally commissions for private investigation
- Manuel Tallafé as Pepe, Tirso's friend and former 3rd Company soldier, who owns a restaurant Tirso frequents
- Itziar Atienza as Amanda Martos, an idealistic police inspector commanding, and working closely with, Ezequiel
- María de Nati as Nata, a female teenaged friend of Nelson's

=== Recurring cast ===
- Franky Martín as Sandro Salazar Campos, boss of organized crime in Entrevías (season 1)
- María Molins as Jimena Abantos, Tirso's daughter and Irene's adoptive mother
- Miguel Angel Jiménez as Santi Abantos, Tirso's son who works at a competing store
- Mariona Terés as Fanny, Santi's wife (season 1)
- Bruno Lastra as Iván, Jimena's husband and Irene's adoptive father (season 1)
- Carmen Esteban as Alicia Solano, Tirso's elderly neighbour
- Adil Koukouh as Loko, Nelson's friend and Nata's boyfriend (season 1)
- Quique Medina as Andrade (season 2)
- Viktor Beltrán as Pantera (season 2)
- Martin Páez as Ribery (season 2)
- Jordi Sánchez as Guillermo Salgado, a crooked property developer (season 2)

== Production ==
Created by David Bermejo, Entrevías is a co-production by Mediaset España and Alea Media. Jordi Terradas, Patricia Trueba, Víctor Pedreira and Natxo López comprised the writing team.

José Coronado, Luis Zahera, Nona Sobo and Felipe Londoño were announced in lead roles, as an army veteran store owner, a morally ambiguous policeman, the store owner's visiting teenaged granddaughter and her local boyfriend, respectively.

Mediaset España reported the beginning of filming on 5 February 2021. The filming crew worked in Villaverde Alto, and the exterior of the Church of San Andrés was used as a shooting location.

In November 2022, the series was renewed for a third season, with Natalia Dicenta, Michelle Calvó, Óscar Higares, and Álex Medina announced as cast additions.

== Release ==
Mediaset España scheduled a 1 February 2022 premiere date on Telecinco. Telecinco decided on the run to air the two filmed seasons in a row. After several series earning poor ratings in their linear run on Telecinco, Wrong Side of the Tracks proved to be an emphatic audience success for the channel. The 16-episode broadcasting run ended on 17 May 2022 with the airing of the finale, drawing an audience of near 1.9 million viewers in prime time. The second season of Wrong Side of the Tracks was released by Netflix on 1 March 2023. Episode one of season three was pre-screened at the Cádiz-based South International Series Festival on 7 October 2023.

=== Season 1 ===
No. overall	No. in season	Title	English title	Original release date
1	1	"Un cabronazo de la vieja escuela"	"An old-school scumbag"	1 February 2022
2	2	"Radios estropeadas"	"Broken radios"	8 February 2022
3	3	"Morder"	"Biting"	15 February 2022
4	4	"Lo que se esconde bajo la alfombra"	"What is hidden under the carpet"	22 February 2022
5	5	"Perro viejo no perrea"	"An old dog can't learn to dance"	1 March 2022
6	6	"Quien roba a un ladrón"	"He who steals from a thief..."	8 March 2022
7	7	"Los Robin Hood"	"The Robin Hoods"	15 March 2022
8	8	"El último tren"	"The last train"	22 March 2022

=== Season 2 ===
No. overall	No. in season	Title	English title	Original release date
9	1	"Colgar la casaca"	"Hanging up the house"	29 March 2022
10	2	"Un vagón olvidado"	"A forgotten wagon"	5 April 2022
11	3	"Escucha al corazón"	"Listen to the heart"	12 April 2022
12	4	"Salto al vacío"	"Fathers and sons"	19 April 2022
13	5	"La cruda verdad"	"The hard truth"	26 April 2022
14	6	"Todo por amor"	"All for love"	3 May 2022
15	7	"Un polo naranja"	"An orange polo shirt"	10 May 2022
16	8	"Si me matan"	"In case I get killed"	17 May 2022

=== Season 3 ===
No. overall	No. in season	Title	English title	Original release date
17	1	"Un palo en el avispero"	"A stick in the hornet's nest"	10 October 2023
18	2	"Culpa"	"Guilt"	17 October 2023
19	3	"Llanto"	"Crying"	24 October 2023
20	4	"Machitos violentos"	"Violent little boys"	31 October 2023
21	5	"Segundas oportunidades"	"Second chances"	7 November 2023
22	6	"Lo que dicta la conciencia"	"What one's conscience dictates"	14 November 2023
23	7	"Un buen muchacho"	"Good boy"	21 November 2023
24	8	"El cielo de Entrevías"	"Entrevías heaven"	28 November 2023

== Accolades ==
Year	Award	Category	Nominee(s)	Result	Ref.
2022	28th Forqué Awards	Best TV Actor	Luis Zahera	Nominated	
2023	31st Actors and Actresses Union Awards	Best Television Actor in a Secondary Role	Manolo Caro	Won	
