= Israel Elejalde =

Spanish actor and director

- Elejalde in 2026
- Born: 10 December 1973 (age 52); Madrid, Spain
- Education: Complutense University of Madrid; RESAD
- Occupations: Actor; theatre director

Israel Elejalde (born 10 December 1973) is a Spanish actor as well as a theatre director. Primarily a stage actor with television and film incursions, he had a breakthrough film performance with his role in the 2014 film Magical Girl, which earned him a nomination to the Goya Award for Best New Actor.

== Biography ==
Born on 10 December 1973 in Villaverde, Madrid, Elejalde's stage debut took place at the Juan de Villanueva High School in Orcasitas. He studied political sciences at the Complutense University of Madrid. He earned his licentiate degree while training as an actor at William Layton's lab. He further trained at the Teatro de La Abadía under José Luis Gómez and studied stage direction at the RESAD.

Some of his most important stage credits include those in Veraneantes, La función por hacer, and Misántropo. Primarily an actor, he also writes and directs. He was in a relationship with actress Bárbara Lennie, along with whom he performed in Magical Girl and different stage plays.

== Filmography ==
=== Film ===
Year	Title	Role	Notes	Ref.
2013	Gente en sitios (People in Places)			
2014	Magical Girl	Alfredo		
2014	El gran salto adelante	Andrés		
2015	Sicarivs: La noche y el silencio	Néstor		
2016	El hombre de las mil caras (Smoke & Mirrors)	González		
2017	Plan de fuga (Getaway Plan)			
2021	Parallel Mothers (Madres paralelas)	Arturo Buendía		
2022	Edén	Victor		
2024	La fianza (The Bond)	Ricardo		
2026	Altas capacidades (Better Class)	Gonzalo		
2027	Blanco			

=== Television ===
Year	Title	Role	Notes	Ref.
2006–10	Cuéntame cómo pasó	Raúl		
2009	Águila Roja	Capitán Rodrigo	Recurring	
2010–11	Amar en tiempos revueltos	Matías Salazar	Main. Introduced in Season 6	
2015	Carlos, rey emperador	Juan Padilla	Recurring. 6 episodes	
2016	Bajo sospecha	Gorka Montero	Main. Introduced in Season 2	
2017–18	Traición	Víctor Ayala	Main	
2019	45 revoluciones (45rpm)	Pedro Zabala	Main. Leading antagonist throughout the series	
2020	Veneno	Pepe Navarro	Recurring. Real-life Pepe Navarro performs a cameo as security guard asking Elejalde to leave	
2021	Ana Tramel. El juego (ANA. all in)	Teniente Moncada	Main	
2023	Las noches de Tefía (Nights in Tefía)	Don Anselmo		

== Awards and nominations ==
Year	Award	Category	Work	Result	Ref.
2004	15th Critical Eye Awards	Theatre Award		Won	
2012	15th Max Awards	Best Leading Actor	Veraneantes	Nominated	
2015	29th Goya Awards	Best New Actor	Magical Girl	Nominated	
