= The Lodgers (2017 film) =

- Theatrical release poster
- Directed by: Brian O'Malley
- Written by: David Turpin
- Produced by: Julianne Forde; Ruth Treacy
- Starring: Charlotte Vega; David Bradley; Bill Milner; Eugene Simon; Moe Dunford; Roisin Murphy; Deirdre O'Kane
- Cinematography: Richard Kendrick
- Edited by: Tony Kearns
- Music by: Kevin Murphy; Stephen Shannon; David Turpin
- Production companies: Epic Pictures Group; Avatar Audio Post Production; Bowsie Workshop; E-Color Studios; Outer Limits Post Production; Point.360; Tailored Films
- Distributed by: Epic Pictures Group
- Release date: September 8, 2017 (Toronto International Film Festival)
- Running time: 92 minutes
- Country: Ireland
- Language: English
- Box office: $916,727

The Lodgers is a 2017 Irish gothic horror film written by David Turpin and directed by Brian O'Malley. The film stars Charlotte Vega, Bill Milner, and Eugene Simon.

It was shot on location at Loftus Hall in 2016 and premiered at the Toronto International Film Festival 2017.

== Synopsis ==
In 1920, rural Ireland, Anglo-Irish twins Rachel (Charlotte Vega) and Edward (Bill Milner) share an isolated existence in their crumbling family estate. Each night, the property becomes the domain of sinister watery presences ("the lodgers") which enforce three rules upon the twins: they must be in bed by midnight; they may not permit an outsider past the threshold; if one attempts to escape, the life of the other is placed in jeopardy. They are reminded of these rules by way of a nursery rhyme: "Girl child, boy child, listen well. Be in bed by midnight's bell. Never let a stranger through your door. Never leave each other all alone. Good sister, good brother be, follow well these cautions three. Long as your blood be ours alone, we'll see you ever from below." A curse lies upon their family—a "stain" that is passed on from one generation to the next: each generation bears incestuous twins, breeding the next generation before taking their own lives by drowning. When Rachel and Edward's eighteenth birthday comes, Rachel wishes to leave with Edward, and in doing so hopefully leave the family curse behind. Edward, out of trauma due to witnessing his parents' suicide and the legacy they left him and his sister, has become a recluse and refuses to leave. Tensions rise when troubled war veteran Sean (Eugene Simon) returns to the nearby village. He is immediately drawn to the mysterious Rachel, who in turn sees in Sean a chance for freedom and so begins to break the rules set out by the lodgers. The consequences pull Rachel into a deadly confrontation with her brother—and with the curse that haunts them.

== Cast ==
- Charlotte Vega as Rachel
- David Bradley as Bermingham
- Bill Milner as Edward
- Eugene Simon as Sean
- Moe Dunford as Dessie
- Roisin Murphy as Kay
- Deirdre O'Kane as Maura
- Carolyn Bracken as Lodger

== Release ==
The Lodgers was chosen as part of the official selection for the Contemporary World Cinema category at the Toronto International Film Festival. This was the film's world premiere. The Lodgers was screened during the opening weekend of the festival on September 8 and 9. The director, writer, producer, and three lead cast were in attendance. It was released on March 9 in Italy where it made $258,508 on its opening weekend.

== Reception ==
=== Critical response ===
On review aggregator Rotten Tomatoes, the film holds an approval rating of 56% based on 45 reviews, with a weighted average rating of 5.8/10. The website's critics consensus reads, "Like many real-life long-term visitors, The Lodgers starts out with a modicum of mystery and excitement, but eventually overstays its welcome." On Metacritic, the film has a weighted average score of 52 out of 100, based on 8 critics, indicating "mixed or average reviews".

Jonathan Barken from Dread Central wrote: "Delicately crafted, The Lodgers is a richly woven tapestry of classically inspired gothic horror. Smart, scary, and undeniably beautiful, it will no doubt be considered one of the pinnacles of its genre." Chris Alexander from ComingSoon.net wrote: "There hasn’t been a more effective, disturbing and sensorially pleasing film of this kind since Alejandro Amenabar’s The Others and, like that masterpiece, O’Malley’s artful, lurid and meticulously orchestrated exercise in atmosphere, pretty misery and dread seeps deep under your skin. And it stays there. For keeps." Justin Lowe from The Hollywood Reporter wrote: "finely attuned, atmospheric filmmaking more likely to catch the attention of art house aficionados than dedicated horror fans."

Noel Murray from the Los Angeles Times wrote: "Until its suspenseful final 15 minutes, The Lodgers is frustratingly stingy with the scares, mostly limiting the spooky stuff to creaky noises and the recurring image of water dripping upward...(the film) isn't especially frightening, but as the story of people weighed down by their legacies, it is genuinely haunting." Manohla Dargis from The New York Times said about the film: "Working with an uneven cast and an undercooked story, Mr. O’Malley hits the horror beats just fine (slam, creak, squeak) without putting a sinister spin on the assorted strange doings. For all the genre exertions, none of this feels the least bit spooky, including the digital ghouls that float in and the cobwebs that look as if they originated in a spray can."

Katie Rife from The A.V. Club stated: "as a ghost story, The Lodgers is about as original as “it was a dark and stormy night,” moldy old tropes can still have their charms. Just look at that house." Simon Abrams from RogerEbert.com gave the film two out of four stars and wrote: "The Lodgers disappoints on a number of levels, many of which have more to do with the limitations of its creators' imagination than the apparently minuscule budget."

=== Accolades ===
The Lodgers won the prizes for "Best Actress" (Charlotte Vega) and Best Special Effects at the Fancine. The film also won "Best Visual Effects" and was nominated "Best Production Design" and "Best Costume Design" at the 15th Irish Film & Television Awards. At the "Molins de Rei Horror Film Festival", The Lodgers won the Jury Prize for "Best Film".

Award	Date of ceremony	Category	Recipient(s) and nominee(s)	Result	Ref.
Saturn Awards	27 June 2018	Best International Film	The Lodgers	Nominated	
