= Desaparecidos (Spanish TV series) =

Spanish television series

- Genre: Police procedural; Drama
- Created by: Curro Royo
- Directed by: Miguel Ángel Vivas; Inma Torrente; Jacobo Martos
- Starring: Juan Echanove; Michelle Calvó; Elvira Mínguez; Maxi Iglesias; Chani Martín; Amanda Ríos
- Composer: Cesar Benito
- Country of origin: Spain
- Original language: Spanish
- No. of seasons: 1
- No. of episodes: 13

Production
- Running time: 72 min (approx.)
- Production companies: Mediaset España; Plano a Plano (S. 1)

Original release
- Network: Amazon Prime Video
- Release: 19 June 2020

Desaparecidos is a Spanish police procedural television series starring Juan Echanove, Elvira Mínguez, Maxi Iglesias and Michelle Calvó, dealing about the work of a police unit specialised on cases of missing people. Produced by Mediaset España and Plano a Plano, the first season was originally released on Amazon Prime Video on 19 June 2020.

== Premise ==
The fiction tracks the work of the Brigada Central de la Policía's Grupo 2 de Desaparecidos (transl. 'Group 2 of Missing People') police unit led by Santiago Abad (Juan Echanove) after the incorporation of Inspector Sonia Ledesma (Michelle Calvó). It also features the police collaboration with an association for support of missing person cases, 'Ayuda Desaparecidos'.

== Cast ==
Main

- Juan Echanove as Chief Inspector Santiago Abad.
- Michelle Calvó as Inspector Sonia Ledesma.
- Elvira Mínguez as Carmen Fuentes, director of the NGO 'Ayuda Desaparecidos'.
- Maxi Iglesias as Deputy Inspector Rodrigo Medina.
- Chani Martín as Sebastián "Sebas" Cano.
- Amanda Ríos as Azhar García.

Recurring and guest

- Nerea Barros
- Luisa Gavasa
- Patxi Freytez
- Diana Palazón
- Mar Regueras
- Paco Marín
- Fátima Baeza

== Production and release ==
Created by Curro Royo based on an original idea by Javier Ugarte, Jorge Guerricaechevarría and Patxi Amezcua, the first season of Desaparecidos was produced by Mediaset España in collaboration with Plano a Plano. The writing team of the first season was formed by Curro Royo, Miguel Ángel Fernández, Irene Olaciregui, Mercedes Cruz, Juan Vicente Pozuelo, Joaquín Górriz and Eva Peris, whereas the episodes were directed by Miguel Ángel Vivas (who directed the key episodes), Inma Torrente and Jacobo Martos. Shooting took place in 2019 in Madrid.

Featuring a running time of around 72 minutes, the 13 episodes comprising the first season were released on Amazon Prime Video on 19 June 2020.

While Mediaset España renovated Desaparecidos for a second season, they broke the collaboration with the production company Plano a Plano, due to financial disagreements, tasking instead the production of the second season to Unicorn Content, the company led by Xelo Montesinos and Ana Rosa Quintana.

Series	Episodes	Originally released	Network	Ref.
1	13	19 June 2020	Amazon Prime Video	

No. overall	No. in season	Title	Original release date
1	1	"Seguimos buscando"	19 December 2020
2	2	"Lo que parece"	19 December 2020
3	3	"Los seres queridos"	19 December 2020
4	4	"Desestructurados"	19 December 2020
5	5	"Huir y proteger"	19 December 2020
6	6	"Al mando"	19 December 2020
7	7	"No puedo vivir sin ti"	19 December 2020
8	8	"Asuntos propios"	19 December 2020
9	9	"La culpa"	19 December 2020
10	10	"Truco y trato"	19 December 2020
11	11	"Ellos"	19 December 2020
12	12	"Lo que pasó"	19 December 2020
13	13	"Final y principio"	19 December 2020

== Awards and nominations ==
Year	Award	Category	Nominee(s)	Result	Ref.
2021	8th MiM Series Awards	Best Drama Series		Nominated	
2021	8th MiM Series Awards	Best Drama Actor	Juan Echanove	Nominated	
