= Utopia (2024 film) =

- Directed by: James Bamford (stunt coordinator)
- Written by: Ian Neligh; Steven Paul
- Produced by: SP Media Group
- Starring: Moe Dunford; Charlotte Vega; Daniel Bernhardt; Sean James Sutton; Philipp Boos
- Cinematography: Frank Meyer
- Edited by: Trevor Mirosh
- Music by: Rich Walters
- Production company: SP Media Group
- Distributed by: Republic Pictures; Paramount Pictures
- Release date: December 10, 2024
- Running time: 91 minutes
- Country: United States
- Language: English

Utopia is a 2024 American cyber thriller action film directed by James Bamford and written by Ian Neligh and Steven Paul. The film stars Moe Dunford, Charlotte Vega, Daniel Bernhardt, and Philipp Boos. It was released on December 10, 2024, by Republic Pictures via Paramount Pictures for streaming.

== Plot ==
A soldier investigates his wife's disappearance and infiltrates a high-tech facility, believing she has been caught in a trafficking ring. Beyond its walls, he discovers a futuristic fantasy park where reality and illusion blur, complicating his search for the truth about her fate.

== Cast ==
- Moe Dunford as Damon the soldier
- Charlotte Vega as Alexis his wife
- Daniel Bernhardt as William Sallow
- Michael Xavier as Jeremy Zenner
- Sean James Sutton as Karl Tubin

== Production ==
Utopia was filmed at Boyana Film Studios in Sofia, Bulgaria.

=== Development ===
The film was written by Ian Neligh and Steven Paul, and produced by SP Media Group.

== Release ==
Utopia was released on December 10, 2024, for streaming by Republic Pictures via Paramount Pictures in the United States. The film was subsequently released internationally on Paramount+, including in France on March 1, 2025. The film is rated R.

== Reception ==
Alex Billington of FirstShowing.net gave the film a negative review, comparing it to Westworld and criticizing it as "boring."
