= The Lost Honour of Christopher Jefferies =

2014 television film

- Written by: Peter Morgan
- Directed by: Roger Michell
- Starring: Jason Watkins; Shaun Parkes; Ben Caplan; Nathalie Armin; Joe Sims; Jennifer Higham; Anna Maxwell Martin
- Music by: Dan Jones
- Country of origin: United Kingdom
- Original language: English
- No. of episodes: 2

Production
- Producer: Kevin Loader
- Cinematography: Mike Eley
- Editor: Kristina Hetherington
- Running time: 114 minutes
- Production company: Carnival Films

Original release
- Network: ITV
- Release: 10 December – 11 December 2014

The Lost Honour of Christopher Jefferies is a 2014 British television miniseries. It tells the real-life story of retired schoolteacher Christopher Jefferies, who was questioned by police as a suspect in the murder of Joanna Yeates. He was vilified by the press, partly because of his eccentric appearance, even after he had been released on bail by the police.

The miniseries was directed by Roger Michell, written by Peter Morgan, and stars Jason Watkins as Jefferies. The title is taken from The Lost Honour of Katharina Blum by Heinrich Böll, a fictional account of media defamation.

== Plot ==
The drama begins the day before Yeates's disappearance, and follows the innocent Jefferies through his arrest, release and subsequent isolation as his un-sought fame profoundly affects his life. Five weeks later the real killer, neighbour Vincent Tabak, is finally arrested. Jefferies later gives evidence at the Leveson inquiry into the News of the World phone hacking scandal.

== Cast ==
- Jason Watkins as Christopher Jefferies
- Shaun Parkes as Paul Okebu
- Ben Caplan as Charles Chapman
- Nathalie Armin as Melissa Chapman
- Joe Sims as Vincent Tabak
- Jennifer Higham as Tanja
- Matthew Barker as Greg Reardon
- Carla Turner as Joanna Yeates
- Peter Polycarpou as Louis Charalambous
- Anna Maxwell Martin as Janine
- Colin Mace as Peter Stanley
- Steve Coogan as himself (uncredited)

== Production ==
The screenplay was written by Peter Morgan. The Bristol Post reported that Jefferies had read and approved the script, and supported the project. The drama was produced by Carnival Films and Television and aired on 10 and 11 December 2014 on ITV.

== Critical reception ==
In May 2015, it won two awards at the 2015 British Academy Television Awards—Best Mini-Series for the programme itself and Best Actor for Watkins's portrayal of Jefferies.

In 2016 it won two awards at the RTS Awards for Craft in Drama: Best Editing and Sound Fiction.
