= That Dirty Black Bag =

2022 spaghetti western television series

- Genre: Spaghetti Western
- Created by: Mauro Aragoni; Silvia Ebreul; Marcello Izzo
- Inspired by: Quella sporca sacca nera by Mauro Aragoni
- Written by: Mauro Aragoni; Silvia Ebreul; Marcello Izzo; Fabio Paladini
- Story by: Mauro Aragoni; Silvia Ebreul; Marcello Izzo
- Directed by: Mauro Aragoni; Brian O'Malley
- Starring: Douglas Booth; Dominic Cooper; Niv Sultan; Christian Cooke; Rose Williams; Paterson Joseph; Zoe Boyle; Ivan Shaw; Daniel Caltagirone; Benjamin Stender; Aidan Gillen; Guido Caprino; Eugene Brave Rock; Anna Chancellor; Travis Fimmel
- Composer: Mick Giacchino
- Country of origin: Italy
- Original language: English
- No. of seasons: 1
- No. of episodes: 8

Production
- Executive producers: David Davoli; Aaron L. Gilbert; Steven Thibault; Samantha Thomas; Carlo Degli Esposti; Nicola Serra; Patrizia Massa
- Cinematography: PJ Dillon
- Production companies: Palomar; BRON Studios

Original release
- Network: AMC+
- Release: March 10 – April 28, 2022

That Dirty Black Bag is a Spaghetti Western television series created by Mauro Aragoni, Silvia Ebreul and Marcello Izzo for AMC+. It features an ensemble cast led by Dominic Cooper, Travis Fimmel and Aidan Gillen. The eight-part series was filmed in Italy, Spain and Morocco, and it premiered on March 10, 2022. Envisioned to have a three season run, as of 2026 there have been no further announcements regarding ongoing production.

== Premise ==
In a town full of bounty hunters, bandits and bloody vendettas, Arthur McCoy is a corruptible sheriff with a troubled past. On the other side of things is Red Bill, an infamous solitary bounty hunter known for decapitating his victims and stuffing their heads into a dirty black bag. When the paths of these two men collide, they both learn that in the Wild West, there are no heroes, nobody is invincible, and the predators may become the prey.

== Cast and characters ==
=== Main ===
- Douglas Booth as Red Bill, a bounty hunter who beheads outlaws claiming that "a head weighs less than a body".
- Dominic Cooper as Arthur McCoy, Bronson's brother, sheriff of Greenvale and former outlaw.
- Niv Sultan as Eve Hoover, a former prostitute and owner of Greenvale's brothel.
- Christian Cooke as Steve, a Greenvale homesteader who strongly believes in God and insistently works his land despite the drought that affected the area for five years.
- Rose Williams as Symone, a pretty girl who works as a prostitute in Eve's brothel.
- Paterson Joseph as Charles Thompson, Greenvale's richest man.
- Zoe Boyle as Michelle, Steve's wife.
- Ivan Shaw as Kurt, one of McCoy's deputies.
- Daniel Caltagirone as Henry Longines
- Benjamin Stender as Nathan Longines
- Aidan Gillen as Butler, a solitary farmer who's also a serial killer with implied cannibalistic tendencies and satanic beliefs.
- Guido Caprino as Bronson, a former outlaw and businessman, now also a politician.
- Eugene Brave Rock as The Stranger, a cold-blooded killer of Native American origin.
- Anna Chancellor as Hellen, a rich woman who supports Bronson in his political career and the head of a satanic cult.
- Travis Fimmel as James Anderson, Red Bill's former mentor.

=== Recurring ===
- Jacopo Rampini as Jona, McCoy's first deputy.
- Nicolo Pasetti as Martin, one of McCoy's deputies.
- Terry McMahon as Blaine, a member of Bronson's gang.

== Episodes ==
No.	Title	Directed by	Written by	Original release date
1	"Chapter One: A Head Weighs Less Than a Body"	Mauro Aragoni	Mauro Aragoni, Silvia Ebreul, Marcello Izzo	March 10, 2022
A bounty killer known as Red Bill confronts a killer at the scene of a church massacre. When the man draws, Red Bill shoots him in self-defense, then approaches the wounded man and decapitates him. Elsewhere, a farmer named Steve Anderson and his family discover their horses are gone, and Anderson deduces Thompson—a land baron who has been after their land—is responsible. Desperate, Anderson turns to Greenville Sheriff Arthur McCoy for help. McCoy refuses and rudely advises Anderson to sell out to Thompson. McCoy and his deputies attempt to arrest an outlaw named Quinn, but find Red Bill has already killed him. Red Bill demands McCoy pay him his bounty money; McCoy refuses and tells him to leave and never return. In town, Anderson approaches his ex-lover and brothel owner Eve for help; she also refuses, but they end up having sex. Later, Red Bill rides into town and is confronted by McCoy who confiscates his money, canteen, and gun. Red Bill responds by leaving town with McCoy's horse. Enraged, McCoy orders one of his deputies to bring him back. Meanwhile Anderson arrives at Thompson's ranch and confronts him, but the latter is unmoved and Anderson departs. McCoy's deputy catches up with Red Bill who threatens him into turning back. Red Bill comes across a goat farmer named Butler who seemingly welcomes him in, but then poisons him with water. Red Bill awakens tied up and is confronted by the insane Butler who tortures him by feeding him some of his horse. Elsewhere, McCoy and his right hand man Kurt kill Jesse—their young deputy who helped them obtain stolen bank money. After burying Jesse and the money, a vengeful McCoy and Kurt set off to track Red Bill down.
2	"Chapter Two: Prisoner"	Brian O'Malley	Mauro Aragoni, Silvia Ebreul, Marcello Izzo	March 17, 2022
McCoy and Kurt continue their search for Red Bill. Along the way we learn McCoy was a fugitive who arrived in Greenville and eventually became their sheriff. McCoy and Kurt get into a tense argument on whether the stolen cash is worth the trouble. The two men reconcile and continue on their way. Meanwhile in town one of McCoy's deputies Nathan tells his young daughter of his intention to propose to Symone one of Eve's whores but is kicked out by a protective Eve before he can do it. Eve and her girls leave town in search of a spring that Anderson had shown her when they were together. Elsewhere Red Bill is tortured by Butler who is revealed to be a cannibalistic serial killer with satanic beliefs. Butler tortures Red Bill by hanging him upside down and with smoke from a cigar. In Greenville Anderson bids farewell to Eve and makes a final attempt to convince the townspeople that he can find water for them but fails when Thompson gains the support of the crowd. As a defeated Anderson starts to head home a fellow farmer, Jack, accepts his offer and takes him and his family in. McCoy and Kurt arrive at Butler's farm in search of Red Bill. Butler lies and tells the two no-one has passed through. Butler attempts to poison them as well but McCoy senses his deceit. Later at dusk McCoy and Kurt sneak back and murder Butler and find the belongings of his past victims. As McCoy and Kurt leave Butler's farm with Red Bill as their prisoner a pile of the bones of his victims remain behind forming the shape of an eye.
3	"Chapter Three: Alliances"	Mauro Aragoni	Mauro Aragoni, Silvia Ebreul, Marcello Izzo	March 24, 2022
McCoy, Kurt, and Red Bill are on their way back to Greenville a day after departing from Butler's farm. McCoy and Kurt abuse Red Bill by denying him water and staging a quick mock trial. The three men arrive at the bridge only to find it collapsed. McCoy and Kurt are forced to abandon their horses to save water, much to Red Bill's delight. In Greenville, Eve assumes control of the town in McCoy's absence, infuriating Nathan. Henry, another one of McCoy's deputies, who is also Nathan's cousin, presses Symone into confessing that she doesn't love Nathan anymore. Later, Nathan confronts Symone and officially proposes to her, only for her to kindly but cruelly reject him. Enraged and heartbroken, Nathan viciously assaults her. Elsewhere, an unnamed Indian with a specially designed gun kills a group of men who were holding him captive in the desert and flees on horseback. Eve has a flashback. When she and Anderson were at the spring together, she removes her hair, revealing she is bald. Unlike others, Anderson accepts her for who she is and they kiss. Now inspired, Eve rides out to Anderson's farm and begs him to go away with her. Anderson tells her his loyalties lie with his family now and brands her as his greatest mistake. The Indian arrives at the estate of a wealthy outlaw named Bronson. Bronson's gang robbed a stagecoach, only to be ambushed and killed. Their loot is then taken by McCoy, Kurt, and Jesse. Bronson deduces McCoy's location and kills the sole survivor of the botched heist, then orders the Indian and the rest of his men to head for Greenville. Later that night, one of Bronson's associates, Helen, orders him to destroy something she refers to as unholy. It is the knife with an eye carved in its handle that appeared in Red Bill's flashbacks revealing Bronson as the man who killed his mother, the tragedy that inspired Red Bill to become a bounty killer. At the same time, Red Bill knowingly asks McCoy how many men he has killed, while Eve murders Nathan for disfiguring Symone's face. Nathan's daughter wakes up as Eve is leaveing. Eve motions for her to be silent and departs.
4	"Chapter Four: Genesis"	Brian O'Malley	Mauro Aragoni, Silvia Ebreul, Marcello Izzo	March 31, 2022
5	"Chapter Five: Justice"	Mauro Aragoni	Mauro Aragoni, Silvia Ebreul, Marcello Izzo, Fabio Paladini	April 7, 2022
6	"Chapter Six: To Hell"	Brian O'Malley	Mauro Aragoni, Silvia Ebreul, Marcello Izzo, Fabio Paladini	April 14, 2022
7	"Chapter Seven: The Plan"	Mauro Aragoni	Mauro Aragoni, Silvia Ebreul, Marcello Izzo, Fabio Paladini	April 21, 2022
8	"Chapter Eight: The Great Duel"	Brian O'Malley	Mauro Aragoni, Silvia Ebreul, Marcello Izzo, Fabio Paladini	April 28, 2022

== Production ==
In December 2019, Mediawan announced they had come on board to distribute That Dirty Black Bag, which had been in various stages of development for several years. In June 2021, BRON Studios and Palomar announced the stars of the series would be Dominic Cooper and Douglas Booth with the ensemble cast for the series also being announced at the same time. The series comes from Italian filmmaker Mauro Aragoni, who co-wrote the series with Silvia Ebreul, Marcello Izzo and Fabio Paladini. Series directors are Brian O'Malley and Aragoni. In November 2021, AMC+ announced that it had acquired That Dirty Black Bag. The 8-part series is being produced in English with three seasons already planned.
