= The Ex-Wife =

British television series

- Release poster
- Genre: Drama; Mystery; Thriller
- Based on: The Ex-Wife by Jess Ryder
- Starring: Céline Buckens; Tom Mison; Janet Montgomery; Jordan Stephens; Clare Foster; Adam Drew; Sam Hoare; Katie McGrath
- Composer: Stephen Shannon
- Country of origin: United Kingdom
- Original language: English
- No. of series: 2
- No. of episodes: 8

Production
- Executive producers: Mike Benson; Chiara Cardoso; Herbert Kloiber; Jan Page; Olivia Pahl; Giuliano Papadia; Catherine Steadman
- Producer: Andy Morgan
- Cinematography: Manoel C. Ferreira
- Editor: Darragh Moran
- Running time: 45 minutes
- Production companies: BlackBox Multimedia; Clapperboard Studios; Night Train Media

Original release
- Network: Paramount+
- Release: 12 October 2022 – 10 April 2025

The Ex-Wife is a British drama thriller television series based on Jess Ryder's book of the same name. It premiered on 12 October 2022, on Paramount+. The series stars Céline Buckens, Tom Mison, Janet Montgomery, Jordan Stephens, Clare Foster, Adam Drew and Sam Hoare.

The first series consisted of four episodes, all directed by Brian O'Malley. The book was adapted to TV by Downton Abbey's Catherine Steadman. A second four-episode series was released in 2025, with Katie McGrath replacing Janet Montgomery.

== Premise ==
Tasha seems to have landed a fairytale life: a beautiful house, a charming and wealthy older husband, and a sweet baby daughter. However, her life is overshadowed by Jen, Jack's elegant ex-wife, who remains involved in Jack's life and close with his family. As Jen's presence grows more intrusive, Tasha becomes paranoid, convinced that the ex-wife is trying to sabotage her marriage and take her place. But Jen was herself a victim of Jack's manipulation. Once Jen recognizes the extent of Jack’s abuse of Tasha, she breaks free from his control. She refuses to go through with kidnapping baby Emily and instead teams up with Tasha.

== Cast and characters ==
=== Main ===
- Céline Buckens as Natasha "Tasha", Jack's new wife, who returns home one day to find out that her daughter Emily and husband Jack have disappeared.
- Tom Mison as Jack, Tasha's husband. He was previously married to Jen. He and Tasha have one daughter together, Emily.
- Janet Montgomery (Season 1) and Katie McGrath (Season 2) as Jen, Jack's ex-wife. She is introduced as the overbearing, boundary-crossing ex-wife who constantly intrudes on Jack and Tasha’s life. She appears jealous and obsessed, pushing Tasha into extreme paranoia. But it turns out that Jen was herself a victim of Jack's manipulation.
- Jordan Stephens as Sam, Tasha's friend, with whom she had a sexual relationship in the past.
- Clare Foster as Hayley, Jack's sister. She misbehaves with Tasha, who endures it for the sake of the family.

=== Recurring ===
- Adam Drew as Toby
- Amro Mahmoud as Darren
- Rebecka Johnston as nursery manager
- Sam Hoare as Johnny
- Sam Bell as nursery worker
- Roderick Hill as Officer Warren
- Abe Jarman Officer Clarke
- Nina Singh as Lola
- Daniel Bellus as Alex
- Dylan Baldwin as I.O. Berry
- James Lailey as Simon
- Jake Fairbrother as Connor
- Anna Savva as Maria

== Production ==
=== Casting ===
It was first announced that Céline Buckens would play the main role of Tasha. On 25 April 2022 it was announced that Tom Mison, Janet Montgomery and Jordan Stephens would join the cast as Tasha's husband Jack, Jack's ex-wife Jen and Tasha's old friend Sam, respectively. Executive producer Mike Benson commented upon the announcement: "We are absolutely delighted Tom, Janet and Jordan have joined the project alongside the brilliant Celine Buckens – our international cast have incredible experience and credits behind them. I'm sure they will inject a real nuance and complexity to a drama where nothing is quite what it seems."

=== Filming ===
Though set in London, England, the miniseries was shot in Budapest, Hungary. Filming began on 10 April 2022 in Budapest, set to wrap later in the Spring, for a total of six weeks of filming. Filming for the second season took place in Cyprus in 2024.

== Release ==
The miniseries premiered on Paramount+ on 12 October 2022.
