= La verdad (TV series) =

Spanish streaming television series

- Genre: Domestic noir
- Created by: César Benítez; Aitor Gabilondo
- Starring: Elena Rivera; Lydia Bosch; Jon Kortajarena; José Luis G. Pérez; Ginés García Millán; Irene Montalà
- Country of origin: Spain
- Original language: Spanish
- No. of seasons: 1
- No. of episodes: 16

Production
- Production locations: Cantabria, Madrid
- Production company: Plano a Plano

Original release
- Network: Telecinco
- Release: 21 May – 26 December 2018

La verdad (transl. 'The Truth') is a Spanish domestic noir television series created by César Benítez and Aitor Gabilondo that originally aired on Telecinco from 21 May to 26 December 2018. The cast, led by Elena Rivera, also features Lydia Bosch, Jon Kortajarena, José Luis García Pérez, Ginés García Millán and Irene Montalà, among others.

== Premise ==
The fiction is primarily set in Cantabria. 8 years after the disappearance of a girl (Paula), a teenager claiming to be her comes into action. The family welcomes her. But suspicions about the true identity behind the 17-year-old woman do not end there as her narrative is not exactly credible and she may be an imposter.

== Cast ==
- Elena Rivera as Paula García.
- Lydia Bosch as Lidia McMahón.
- Jon Kortajarena as Marcos Eguía.
- José Luis García Pérez as Lalo Ruiz.
- Ginés García Millán as Fernando García.
- Irene Montalà as Alicia Costa.
- Oriol Puig as Toni García McMahón.
- Juan Messeguer as Enrique McMahón.
- Ana Álvarez as Ana Llanos.
- Esmeralda Moya as Laura Santos.
- Pedro Mari Sánchez as Luis Fonseca.
- Xavier Estévez as Ramiro Lousa.
- Susi Sánchez as Comisaria Laguna.
- Julius Cotter as Hugh Fleming.
- Leire Zuazua as Andrea López.
- Berta Ojea as Rosario.
- Ayoub El Hilali as Bashir.

== Production ==
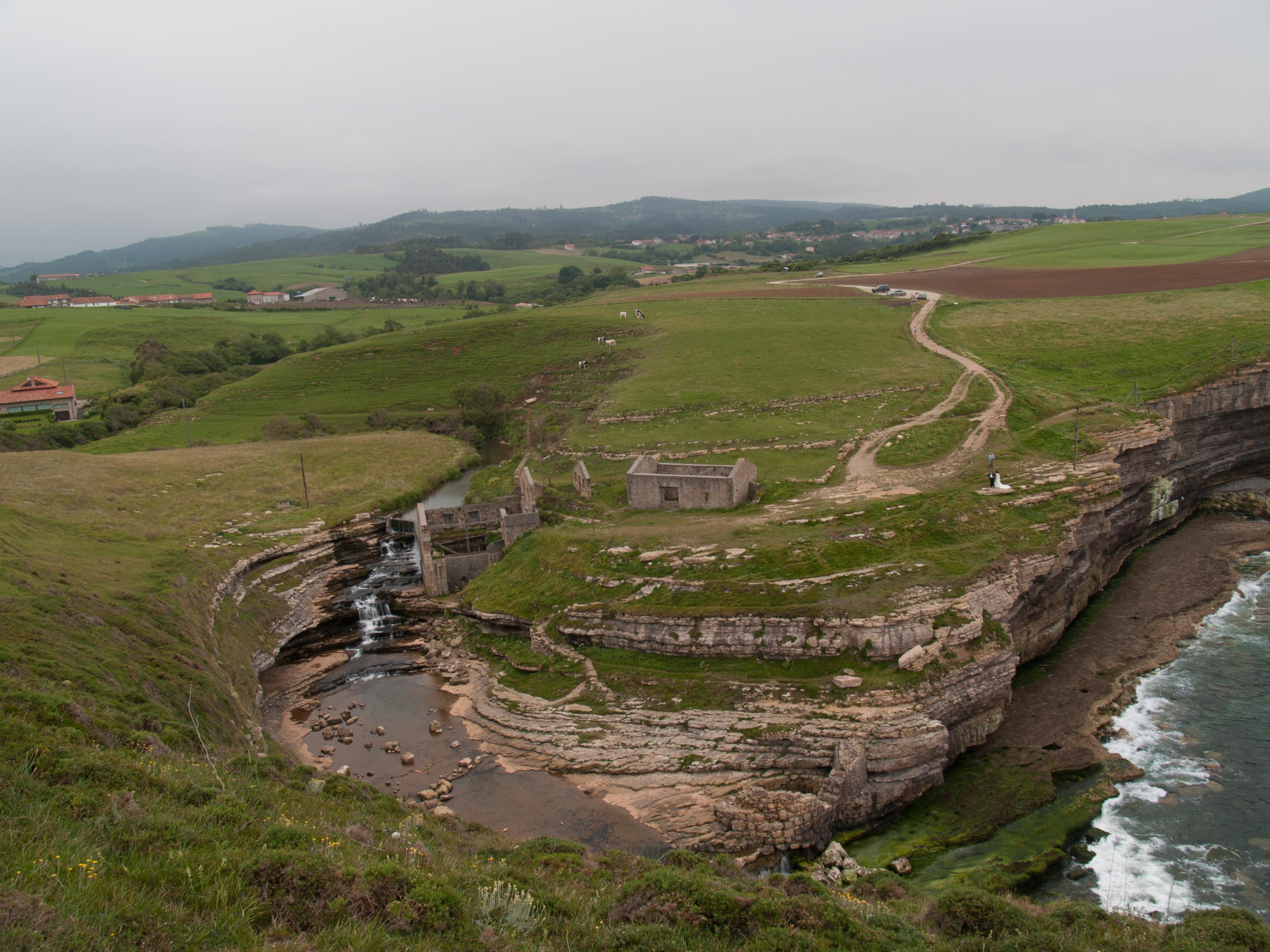
The cliff of El Bolao was one of the shooting locations.

Created by César Benítez and Aitor Gabilondo, the series was produced by Plano a Plano for Mediaset España. Norberto López Amado, Jorge Dorado, Iñaki Mercero, Fernando Bassi, José Ramos Paíno and Pablo Tobías assumed the direction of the episodes.

The series was shot on location in Cantabria, in places such as Santander, Somo, Laredo, Langre, the cliff of El Bolao and Ruiloba. Additional footage was also shot in Madrid. Filming started in December 2015 and wrapped in November 2016.

== Release ==
Consisting of 16 episodes, the series premiered on Telecinco on 21 May 2018. Cut by a hiatus from July to November, the broadcasting run ended on 26 December 2018. Overall the series averaged "unimpressive" viewership ratings (1,852 million viewers and a 12.8% audience share).

| No. | Title | Original release date |
|---|---|---|
| 1 | "La jaula abierta..." | 21 May 2018 |
| 2 | "La sombra de la duda" | 28 May 2018 |
| 3 | "Vivir con miedo" | 4 June 2018 |
| 4 | "Secretos de familia" | 12 June 2018 |
| 5 | "Corre, Sara, corre" | 19 June 2018 |
| 6 | "Jugar con fuego" | 26 June 2018 |
| 7 | "Líneas rojas" | 12 July 2018 |
| 8 | "Sara, Sarita, chula" | 19 July 2018 |
| 9 | "Sábado" | 7 November 2018 |
| 10 | "Galerna" | 14 November 2018 |
| 11 | "Adiós, Irina" | 21 November 2018 |
| 12 | "Sara te quiere" | 28 November 2018 |
| 13 | "Cada vez más profundo" | 5 December 2018 |
| 14 | "Nunca más" | 12 December 2018 |
| 15 | "El camino, la mentira y la vida" | 19 December 2018 |
| 16 | "Deseos cumplidos" | 26 December 2018 |

== Awards and nominations ==
| Year | Award | Category | Nominee(s) | Result | Ref. |
|---|---|---|---|---|---|
| 2018 | 20th Iris Awards | Best Actor | Ginés García Millán | Nominated | |
| 2018 | 6th MiM Series Awards | Best Drama Actress | Elena Rivera | Won | |
