= Follow My Voice (film) =

- Theatrical release poster
- Spanish: Sigue mi voz
- Directed by: Inés Pintor; Pablo Santidrián
- Screenplay by: Inés Pintor; Pablo Santidrián
- Based on: Sigue mi voz by Ariana Godoy
- Produced by: Antonio Asensio; Paloma Molina; Mercedes Gamero; Pablo Nogueroles
- Starring: Berta Castañé; Jae Woo Yang; Claudia Traisac; Fernando Guallar; Nuno Gallego; Iñaki Mur; Itziar Ituño
- Cinematography: Andreu Ortoll
- Edited by: Raquel Marraco
- Music by: Nico Casal
- Production companies: Zeta Cinema; Beta Fiction Spain; Sigue y No Pares AIE
- Distributed by: Beta Fiction Spain
- Release date: 12 September 2025
- Running time: 101 minutes
- Country: Spain
- Language: Spanish

Follow My Voice (Spanish: Sigue mi voz) is a 2025 teen drama film written and directed by Inés Pintor and Pablo Santidrián based on the Watpadd book by Ariana Godoy. It stars Berta Castañé and Jae Woo.

== Plot ==
After some isolation because of a mental health issue, Klara cannot help listening the radio program Sigue mi voz presented by Kang, wondering if she can fall in love with someone because of their voice.

== Cast ==
- Berta Castañé as Klara
- Jae Woo Yang as Kang
- Claudia Traisac as Kamila
- Nuno Gallego as Diego
- Yasmina Drissi as Perla
- Sofía de Iznájar as Ellie
- Adrià Salazar as Erick
- Victoria Oliver as Yana
- Fernando Guallar as Andy
- Alberto Jo Lee
- Iñaki Mur
- Itziar Ituño

== Production ==
Zeta Cinema and Beta Fiction Spain produced Follow My Voice with the association of Wattpad Webtoon Studios. The film also had the participation of Prime Video and backing from ICAA. Shooting locations in Navarre included Pamplona and Altsasu.

== Release ==
The film was released theatrically in Spain on 12 September 2025 by Beta Fiction Spain.

== Reception ==
Rubén Romero Santos of Cinemanía rated the film 3 out of 5 stars, pointing out that while some sequences "flirt with emotional pornography and the film is overloaded with grief", the purpose of delivering a more than decent teen film is achieved.

Carmen L. Lobo of La Razón rated the film 3 out of 5 stars, singling out the "charming" couple formed by Castañé and Woo as the best thing about the film.

== See also ==
- List of Spanish films of 2025
