= Nathalie Armin =

British actress

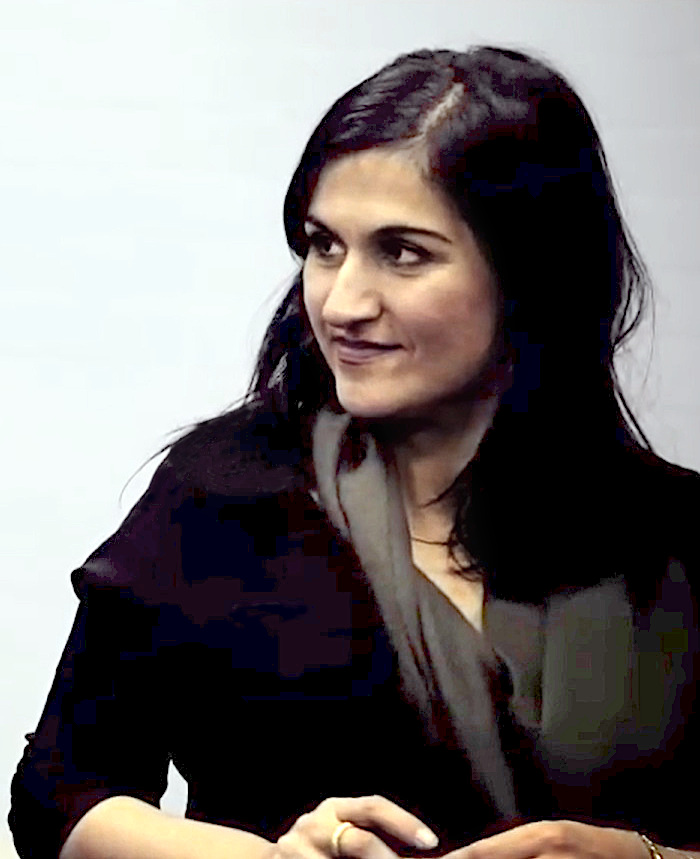
- Nathalie Armin (2013)
- Education: Royal Central School of Speech & Drama
- Occupation: Actress
- Years active: 2000–present

Nathalie Armin is a British actress. She has appeared in a number of stage productions. On television, she is known for her roles in the BBC Three comedy Juice (2023) and the BBC One drama Showtrial (2024).

== Early life and education ==
Nathalie Armin was born to Iranian parents. She studied at the Royal Central School of Speech and Drama.

== Career ==
Armin appeared in David Hare's Behind the Beautiful Forevers, and the acclaimed 2015 production of Stephen Adly Guirgis's The Motherfucker with the Hat, both at the Royal National Theatre.

In her Evening Standard review of Steve Water's 2017 play Limehouse at the Donmar Warehouse, critic Fiona Mountford praised Armin as "one of this country's finest under-the-radar stage actresses".

Armin later performed alongside Juliet Stevenson in the original production of Robert Icke's critically acclaimed The Doctor at the Almeida Theatre, and in 2023 she starred in the English premiere of Hanya Yanagihara's A Little Life directed by Ivo Van Hove.

Armin's screen credits include Peter Morgan's The Lost Honour of Christopher Jefferies, the award-winning C4 comedy-drama Home, and the acclaimed TV adaptation of Anthony Horowitz's Magpie Murders.

In 2023 she appeared as series regular The Boss in Mawaan Rizwan's BBC Three comedy, Juice, and she led series two of BBC Drama Showtrial, alongside Adeel Akhtar, in 2024.

== Credits ==
=== Theatre ===
Year	Title	Role	Notes
2000	Local	Yasmin	Royal Court Theatre
2002	CrazyBlackMuthaF*ckinSelf	Kareema	Royal Court Theatre
2004	Othello	Bianca	Royal Shakespeare Company
2007	Damascus	Muna	Traverse Theatre / Kiln Theatre
2009	Arabian Nights	Kasim's Wife	Royal Shakespeare Company
2012	The Bomb	Irina	Kiln Theatre
2015	Behind the Beautiful Forevers	Poornima	Royal National Theatre
2015	Dara	Jahanara	Royal National Theatre
2015	The Motherfucker with the Hat	Victoria	Royal National Theatre
2016	Another World	Yasmin	Royal National Theatre
2017	Limehouse	Debbie Owen	Donmar Warehouse
2018	Machinal	Stenographer/Nurse	Almeida Theatre
2018	Raleigh: The Treason Trial	Coke	Shakespeare's Globe
2019	Anna	Marion Bourmer	Royal National Theatre
2019	The Doctor	Flint	Almeida Theatre
2022	Force Majeure	Charlotte	Donmar Warehouse
2023	A Little Life	Ana	Harold Pinter Theatre/Savoy Theatre

=== Television ===
Year	Title	Role	Notes
2002	The Jury	Usher	Granada Television
2005	William and Mary	Nola	Meridian / ITV Series 1, 2 & 3
2005	Spooks	Joumana	BBC
2005	The English Harem	Firouzeh	ITV
2008	Being Human	Eleanor	Touchpaper Television
2009	The Omid Djalili Show	Catherine of Aragorn	BBC
2009	The Fixer	DS Rowe	Kudos
2015	The Lost Honour of Christopher Jefferies	Melissa Chapman	Carnival Film & Television
2016	Maigret: Maigret's Dead Man	Nina Gaubert	PeKet Co-Productions Limited / ITV
2016	Humans	Tabitha	Channel Four / AMC
2017	Vera	Eva Motian	ITV
2017	Unforgotten	Gill	Mainstreet Pictures / ITV
2017	Electric Dreams	State's Advocate	Channel Four/ Sony/ Left Bank
2018	Marcella	Helen	ITV / Buccaneer
2019	Home	Yasmine	Series 1 Channel 4/Channel X
2020	Too Close	Prosecution	ITV
2020	Home	Yasmine	Series 2 Channel 4/Channel X
2021	Magpie Murders	Melissa Conway	PBS / Britbox
2022	Flatshare	Tania Joseph	BBC
2022	Treason	Lydia Jena	Netflix
2022	Untitled Alfonso Cuaron Project	Nurse	Apple TV
2023	Juice	The Boss	BBC Three
2024	Showtrial	Leila	Series 2 / World Productions
2025-Present	Maigret	Prosecutor Mathilde Kernavel	PBS / Playground Entertainment

=== Film ===
Year	Title	Role	Notes
2007	Grow Your Own	Soraya	BBC Films
2016	Denial	Monica Du Champs	BBC Films
2016	Earthy Encounters	Dr Keys	Short Film / Creative England
2018	Final Score	Milson	Signature Films / Highland Film Group
2022	The Batman	ATF Leader	Warner Brothers
2023	Anna	Maaret	Good Films Collective
