= Aitor Gabilondo =

Spanish director

Aitor Gabilondo (born 1972) is a Spanish screenwriter and television producer.

== Biography ==
Aitor Gabilondo was born in San Sebastián in 1972. He began his career as a writer in Cadena SER, Canal+, and ETB. He worked as a screenwriter and executive producer of fiction works in television series such as El síndrome de Ulises, Génesis: en la mente del asesino, Periodistas, and El comisario. In 2017, following his exit from Plano a Plano (which he founded together with César Benítez), he co-founded the production company Alea Media, a joint venture with Mediaset España.

His credits as television creator include El Príncipe, Allí abajo, La verdad, Vivir sin permiso, Patria, Madres. Amor y vida, Entrevías (Wrong Side of the Tracks) with David Bermejo, Besos al aire (Blowing Kisses), and El silencio (Mute).

== Accolades ==
Year	Award	Category	Work	Result	Ref.
2021	8th Platino Awards	Best Series Creator	Patria	Won	
