= The Castaways (British TV series) =

British Television series

- Created by: Ben Harris
- Based on: The Castaways by Lucy Clarke
- Written by: Ben Harris; Polly Buckle; Jesse O’Mahoney
- Directed by: Andy Tohill; Ryan Tohill
- Starring: Sheridan Smith; Céline Buckens
- Original language: English
- No. of series: 1
- No. of episodes: 5

Production
- Executive producers: Mike Benson; Ben Harris; Giuliano Papadia; Chiara Cardoso
- Producer: Myf Hopkins
- Cinematography: Tom Pridham
- Editors: Barry Moen; John Phillipson
- Production companies: Clapperboard Studios; Blackbox Multimedia

Original release
- Network: Paramount+
- Release: 26 December 2023

The Castaways is a television series made for Paramount+ adapted from the book of the same name by Lucy Clarke. The series stars Sheridan Smith and Céline Buckens as sisters.

== Synopsis ==
After her sister Lori goes missing whilst travelling abroad, Erin travels to Fiji to investigate the use of her missing sister's credit card on a remote Pacific island.

== Cast ==
- Sheridan Smith as Lori Holme
- Céline Buckens as Erin Holme
- Brendan Cowell as Mike Brasse
- Dominic Tighe as Daniel Elridge
- Lasarus Ratuere as Felix Vatubua
- Charlotte Vega as Amber
- Celeste Dodwell as Natasha
- Joseph Mydell as Jack Bantock

== Production ==
Clapperboard Studios and Blackbox Multimedia produced the series. Mike Benson, Ben Harris, Giuliano Papadia and Chiara Cardoso are executive producers with Harris adapting the book as lead writer. Other writers include Polly Buckle and Jesse O’Mahoney. Myf Hopkins served as the series producer. Andy Tohill and Ryan Tohill directed episodes.

=== Filming ===
Location took place in Fiji and Greece, beginning in June 2023.

== Broadcast ==
The series aired on subscription channel Paramount+ in the United Kingdom on 26 December 2023, with all episodes made available immediately. It was broadcast in the UK on free-to-air terrestrial television Channel 5 nightly between 26 and 30 January 2025, and made available to stream on My5 for one month afterwards.

== Reception ==
The Guardian described The Castaways as: "A darkly plotted and sunnily staged piece of escapism.", and Digital Spy said that "you'll have a right rollicking good time while you're in the thick of it."
