= The Misfits Club =

- Spanish: El club de los incomprendidos
- Directed by: Carlos Sedes
- Screenplay by: Ramón Campos; Gema R. Neira; Cristobal Garrido; Adolfo Valor
- Based on: ¡Buenos días, princesa! by Blue Jeans
- Produced by: Mercedes Gamero; Mikel Lejarza; Ramón Campos; Teresa Fernández-Valdés
- Starring: Charlotte Vega; Àlex Maruny; Ivana Baquero; Michelle Calvó; Andrea Trepat; Jorge Clemente; Patrick Criado
- Production companies: Bambú Producciones; Atresmedia Cine
- Release date: 25 December 2014
- Running time: 105 minutes
- Country: Spain
- Language: Spanish

The Misfits Club (Spanish: El club de los incomprendidos) is a 2014 Spanish teen drama film directed by Carlos Sedes. It is based on the novel ¡Buenos días, princesa! by Blue Jeans (Francisco de Paula), adapted by Ramón Campos, Gema R. Neira, Cristobal Garrido and Adolfo Valor.

== Cast ==
- Charlotte Vega as Valeria
- Àlex Maruny as Raúl
- Ivana Baquero as Meri
- Michelle Calvó as Eli
- Andrea Trepat as Ester
- Jorge Clemente as Bruno
- Patrick Criado as César
- Aitana Sánchez-Gijón as Mara
- Raúl Arévalo as Martín
- Yon González as Rodrigo

== Production ==
The film is a Bambú and Atresmedia Cine production. Mercedes Gamero, Mikel Lejarza, Ramón Campos, and Teresa Fernández Valdés took over production duties.

== Release ==
The film opened in Spanish theatres on 25 December 2014.

== See also ==
- List of Spanish films of 2014
