= Showtrial (TV series) =

British legal drama television series

- A promotional poster for the first series
- Genre: Legal drama; Anthology
- Created by: Ben Richards
- Written by: Ben Richards
- Directed by: Zara Hayes (Series 1); Julia Ford (Series 2)
- Starring: Tracy Ifeachor (Series 1); Céline Buckens (Series 1); Adeel Akhtar (Series 2); Nathalie Armin (Series 2); Michael Socha (Series 2)
- Composers: Samuel Sim (Series 1); Carly Paradis (Series 2)
- Country of origin: United Kingdom
- Original language: English
- No. of series: 2
- No. of episodes: 10

Production
- Executive producers: Ben Richards; Simon Heath; Mona Qureshi
- Producer: Christopher Hall
- Production company: World Productions

Original release
- Network: BBC One
- Release: 31 October 2021 – 3 November 2024

Showtrial is a British legal drama anthology television series created by Ben Richards. The five-part first series aired on BBC One from October to November 2021 and starred Tracy Ifeachor and Céline Buckens. Two years later, it was announced that Showtrial had been developed into an anthology format and that a second series had been ordered, starring a new cast. That second series aired from October to November 2024 and starred Adeel Akhtar, Nathalie Armin, and Michael Socha.

The first series received a mixed reception from critics. The writing, pace, and lack of subtlety received criticism from some reviewers; however, the format, dramatic scenes, and Buckens' acting were praised. Buckens was nominated for various accolades for her portrayal of Talitha Campbell, including the British Academy Television Award for Best Supporting Actress and the International Emmy Award for Best Actress.

== Synopsis ==
=== Series 1 ===
Talitha Campbell, the arrogant daughter of a wealthy entrepreneur Sir Damian Campbell, is arrested following the disappearance of fellow student, Hannah Ellis, the hard-working daughter of a single mother. From Talitha's arrest to the jury's final verdict, Showtrial switches between both sides of the legal battle, as defence and prosecution fight for their version of what really happened to Hannah, and the truth about Talitha: was she falsely accused or is she a callous murderer?

=== Series 2 ===
High-profile climate activist Marcus Calderwood is left to die in a violent hit and run and uses his dying moments to identify his killer: a serving policeman. It explores the worlds of cocky officer Justin Mitchell, anxious defence solicitor Sam Malik and Leila Hassoun-Kenny, a rigorous lawyer leading the case against the accused.

== Cast and characters ==
=== Series 1 ===
- Tracy Ifeachor as duty solicitor, Cleo Roberts
- Céline Buckens as Talitha Campbell
- Kerr Logan as James Thornley, Crown Prosecution Service (CPS)
- Joseph Payne as Dhillon Harwood, co-accused and friend to Talitha
- Lolita Chakrabarti as senior politician, Meera Harwood, mother of Dhillon
- Sharon D. Clarke as Virginia Hoult, Thornley's boss at the CPS
- Sinéad Keenan as Detective Inspector Paula Cassidy
- James Frain as Sir Damian Campbell
- Christopher Hatherall as DC Andy Lowell
- Amy Morgan as Heidi McKinnon, Cleo's partner in their law firm
- Elizabeth Rider as Dame Isobel Cavendish, The Hon. Mrs. Justice Cavendish
- Alec Newman as Dr. Stephen Vendler
- Rupert Holliday-Evans as Brian Reeves
- Claire Lams as Andrea Ellis
- Camilla Power as Cressida, Lady Campbell
- Lu Corfield as Emma Hemmings
- Amy Marston as Lydia Vendler
- Abra Thompson as Hannah Ellis
- Angus Castle-Doughty as Troy Manners
- Mika Simmons as Amanda Wilkinson
- Rebecca Grant as Nisha Baria

=== Series 2 ===
- Adeel Akhtar as Samir 'Sam' Malik, a troubled insomniac defence Solicitor Advocate hired by Mitchell
- Nathalie Armin as Leila Hassoun-Kenny, a senior CPS prosecutor
- Michael Socha as PC Justin Mitchell, an arrogant East Sussex Police officer accused of killing Marcus Calderwood
- Joe Dempsie as DI Miles Southgate, a detective from the neighbouring Hampshire and New Forest Police investigating Mitchell
- Zoe Telford as Helen McGuire, a civilian press officer for East Sussex Police
- Nina Toussaint-White as Claudia Wood, a defence solicitor and Malik's colleague
- John Light as Adrian Gilligan, the South East Chief Crown Prosecutor and Leila's boss
- Fisayo Akinade as Felix Owusu, a local journalist and supporter of Stop Climate Genocide
- Kerrie Hayes as PC Becky Hollis, an East Sussex Police officer and colleague of Mitchell
- Barney Fishwick as Marcus Calderwood, an environmental activist and leader of Stop Climate Genocide
- Aidan McArdle as Patrick Norris, Calderwood's vineyard owning neighbour, previously involved in union busting in Colombia
- Anna Próchniak as Sandra Vodanovic, Mitchell's Serbian-Slovenian partner
- Anna Wilson-Jones as Tamara Baudin-Kenny, Leila's eccentric and troubled half sister
- Pearce Quigley as Philip Holmes KC, the CPS prosecution barrister
- Francesca Annis as Dame Harriet Kenny, an Oxford University philosophy professor and the mother of Leila and Tamara
- Flora Montgomery as Grainne Westwood KC, the defence barrister
- Dylan Smith as Dr. Towler, a psychologist
- Dana Haqjoo as The Judge

== Episodes ==
Series	Episodes	Originally released		Avg. UK viewers (millions)
Series	Episodes	First released	Last released	Avg. UK viewers (millions)
1	5	31 October 2021	28 November 2021	5.90
2	5	6 October 2024	3 November 2024	TBA

=== Series 1 ===
No.	Title	Directed by	Written by	Original release date	UK viewers (millions)
1	"Praying for Her"	Zara Hayes	Ben Richards	31 October 2021	6.69
2	"Little Horses"	Zara Hayes	Ben Richards	7 November 2021	5.24
3	"Lady Tease"	Zara Hayes	Ben Richards	14 November 2021	6.04
4	"Velleities"	Zara Hayes	Ben Richards	21 November 2021	5.69
5	"The Long Voyage"	Zara Hayes	Ben Richards	28 November 2021	5.84

=== Series 2 ===
No.	Title	Directed by	Written by	Original release date	UK viewers (millions)
1	"Officer X"	Julia Ford	Ben Richards	6 October 2024	3.03
2	"The Gambler"	Julia Ford	Ben Richards	13 October 2024	2.94
3	"Decoys"	Julia Ford	Ben Richards	20 October 2024	2.79
4	"No More Questions"	Julia Ford	Ben Richards	27 October 2024	2.99
5	"The Smaller Picture"	Julia Ford	Ben Richards	3 November 2024	3.32

== Production ==
BBC One commissioned Showtrial in 2019 as a five-part miniseries. The series was created and written by Ben Richards. Principal photography began in April 2021 in Bristol, including at the University of Bristol.

Two years after the series had aired, it was announced that the BBC had decided to develop Showtrial into an anthology series. They ordered a second series, also to be written by Richards. Filming commenced in November 2023 in Belfast. The series is actually set in Brighton, but most of the scenes were filmed in Belfast and other places in Northern Ireland. Second unit filming took place in Brighton to make it look authentic. The decision was made after the producers had filmed several series in Northern Ireland, including Line of Duty, finding that parts of Northern Ireland look similar to the south coast of England. Courtroom scenes were shot in the old school gym of the former Corpus Christi College in West Belfast.

== Reception ==
=== Series 1 ===
For her role as Talitha, Céline Buckens was nominated for Best Actress at the TV Choice Awards, as well as being nominated for the British Academy Television Award for Best Supporting Actress and the International Emmy Award for Best Actress.

Rebecca Fielding of The Guardian felt that Showtrial's first series had a lot going on that made it hard for the reviewer to keep up with the premise of the show. However, she was drawn in by the mystery of the case and wanted to watch to the end. Ed Cumming of The Independent praised its cinematography and filming style, describing it as "more energetic and stylish than we are used to from" the BBC. They also commended Tracy Ifeachor's portrayal of a solicitor, but thought that the dialogue was not gripping. Radio Times gave the series two stars out of a possible five as they felt that Showtrial was not subtle enough. Although they also criticised Richard's writing, Radio Times enjoyed the scenes between Buckens and Ifeachor, describing them as "campy fun".

The Evening Standard described Showtrial as a "fresh, considered spin on the usual crime procedural tropes" and commended Buckens' acting abilities for making Talitha "compellingly awful". The Week also commended Buckens' acting and calling her performance "mesmerising" as Talitha.

=== Series 2 ===
The Guardian's Rebecca Nicholson said that the second series was "full of holes, lacks nuance and feels flabby", but observed that "the performances are strong – often stronger than the script," concluding that it was "a compelling watch." In the Evening Standard, William Mata awarded it three stars out of five, describing it as "perfectly serviceable" and praising writer Ben Richards as "the show's biggest strength", although also drew attention to the programme's "overambition ... there are so many characters that some potentially quite interesting threads and crucial character development go unexplored." The Radio Times called it "not only a superior second season, but a gripping standalone tale in its own right", awarding it four stars out of five.
