= Escobar: Paradise Lost =

2014 film by Andrea Di Stefano

- Theatrical release poster
- Directed by: Andrea Di Stefano
- Written by: Andrea Di Stefano
- Produced by: Frederique Dumas; Dimitri Rassam; Jerome Seydoux
- Starring: Benicio Del Toro; Josh Hutcherson; Claudia Traisac; Brady Corbet; Carlos Bardem; Ana Girardot
- Cinematography: Luis David Sansans
- Edited by: David Brenner; Maryline Monthieux
- Music by: Max Richter
- Production companies: Chapter 2 Nexus Factory; Pathé; Roxbury Pictures uFilm
- Distributed by: Pathé Distribution (France and Switzerland); Entertainment One (Spain)
- Release dates: September 11, 2014 (TIFF); November 5, 2014 (France); June 26, 2015 (United States)
- Running time: 120 minutes
- Countries: France; Spain
- Languages: English; Spanish
- Box office: $3.8 million

Escobar: Paradise Lost (also known as Paradise Lost) is a 2014 romantic thriller film written and directed by Andrea Di Stefano in his directorial debut. The film chronicles the life of a surfer who falls in love while working with his brother in Colombia and finds out that the girl's uncle is Colombian drug lord Pablo Escobar.

RADiUS-TWC acquired the North American distribution rights of the film in February 2014. The film premiered at the 2014 Toronto International Film Festival on September 11, 2014 and had a limited release in the United States on June 26, 2015.

== Plot ==
Nick Brady is in Colombia with his brother when he meets Maria. She is the niece of drug kingpin Pablo Escobar. As both Nick and Maria see how dangerous life can be around her uncle Pablo the pair decide to leave Colombia along with Nick's brother, wife and child.

Before they can all get away together Nick and several other "trusted" men are summoned by Pablo, where he will tell them that he made a deal with the Colombian government and will be going away to prison for a very long time. Because of this, he asks the men to go to various locations and to hide his valuable inventory in caves where it would stay for the duration of his prison term. Nick is then told to meet a guide, drive to a cave, place the boxes he's been given in the cave, then dynamite the entrance. Having done that, Nick is to then kill the guide, but Nick finds himself unwilling to kill, especially when the guide turns out to be only 15.

In aiding the guide, Nick discovers he is also on Pablo's hit list. Stuck in a small town where hired killers as well as local police and militia search for him, Nick narrowly escapes and tries to meet up with Maria at a Canadian consulate.

On his way to meet with Maria, Nick finally manages to call his brother's place to warn them to get out, but Escobar's men are already there and have killed his brother, and shoot his brother's wife and child while Nick is on the phone with her.

Two of Escobar's hired guns get into a shootout with Nick and he kills them both, but not before being hit by a bullet. He does manage to meet up with Maria across from the consulate, but he dies soon after. Maria’s fate is left unclear when she tries to get help from the consulate but runs into more of Escobar's men as she does.

== Cast ==
- Benicio del Toro as Pablo Escobar
- Josh Hutcherson as Nick Brady
- Claudia Traisac as Maria
- Brady Corbet as Dylan Brady
- Carlos Bardem as Drago
- Ana Girardot as Anne
- Aaron Zebede as Pepito Torres
- Frank Spano as Christo
- Laura Londoño as María Victoria
- Micke Moreno as Martin

== Production ==
=== Pre-production ===
Of the storyline, Di Stefano claimed "the idea came from three sentences [I] heard from a police officer about a real-life young Italian fellow who went to Colombia to meet his brother, somehow became close to the Escobar family, and then got in trouble."

Hutcherson served as an executive producer for the film, alongside Andrea Di Stefano, assisting with casting and blocking shots.

=== Casting ===
On December 17, 2012, it was rumoured that Josh Hutcherson was in talks to be cast in the leading role. An announcement was made the following day that he had been cast as Nick Brady, the lead role. On March 25, 2013, Brady Corbet was cast as the lead character's brother, Dylan Brady.

=== Filming ===
Principal photography was expected to begin in Panama in March 2013. Filming was initially expected to last a month and a half, finishing on May 30, 2013. However, it was rumored filming was also conducted during June and July 2013.

== Release ==
Escobar: Paradise Lost made its world premiere at the 2014 Toronto International Film Festival on September 11, 2014. It also screened at the 2014 Telluride Film Festival, San Sebastian Film Festival, Rome Film Festival, and Zurich Film Festival.

=== Marketing ===
On July 14, 2014, a teaser trailer was released. In August 2014, four new stills were released. Official trailers were released on September 3, 2014 and November 13, 2014.

=== Home media ===
Escobar: Paradise Lost was released on DVD and Blu-ray on March 19, 2015 in France and April 15, 2015 in Australia and New Zealand. Further DVD and Blu-ray releases include in the United Kingdom, Germany, Spain and the Netherlands on September 21, 2015.

== Reception ==
=== Box office ===
During its opening in France, the film debuted with a weekend total of $601,554. Its opening weekend in Spain brought in $620,845 and $79,637 in the United Arab Emirates. As of September 7, 2015, the film had grossed $3,562,536 in the six foreign markets the film has been released in.

In the United States, the film earned $195,792 during its first two weeks from its limited theatrical release in June and July 2015.

=== Critical response ===
As of June 2020, the film holds a 55% approval rating on review aggregator Rotten Tomatoes, based on 56 reviews with an average rating of 5.62 out of 10. The website's critics consensus reads: "Its focus drifts frustratingly away from the titular druglord, but Escobar: Paradise Lost remains a mildly diverting drama, thanks largely to Benicio del Toro's glowering performance." Metacritic gives the film a score of 56 out of 100, based on reviews from 19 critics, indicating "mixed or average reviews".

At the Telluride Film Festival, Escobar: Paradise Lost received a generally positive critical response. Writing for The Hollywood Reporter, Todd McCarthy called the film "an absorbing and suspenseful drug trade drama" along with citing that "del Toro’s presence, like Brando’s in The Godfather, looms over everything that happens here". McCarthy also stated that "Di Stefano shows some real directorial chops in the film’s central and impressively extended action-suspense sequence". However, "the romantic interplay between Nick and Maria gets a bit tiresome and redundant due to the fact that they’re both so extremely nice and agreeable; Nick’s naivete and goody two-shoes Canadianism (he stresses that he’s not a Yank) also prove wearisome".

Writing for Indiewire, Eric Kohn gave the film a B and praised the performances of del Toro and Hutcherson writing that del Toro "turns Escobar into a subdued terror whose ability to order murders with ease provides the movie with its chief source of dread", while Hutcherson "imbues the character with a believability that transcends the script's limitations". However, Kohn also criticised the film as it "fails to develop the rest of its characters as well as it does for its two central men. The screenplay is similarly marred by formula, lagging whenever it hits certain high melodramatic notes, and reminding us of the stakes in play with mopey, dime-store gravitas".

=== Accolades ===
Awards
| Year | Award | Category | Recipient | Result |
|---|---|---|---|---|
| 2015 | Platino Ibero-American Film Awards | Best Actor | Benicio Del Toro | Nominated |
