= Magical Girl (film) =

2014 film by Carlos Vermut

- Theatrical release poster
- Directed by: Carlos Vermut
- Written by: Carlos Vermut
- Produced by: Pedro Hernández Santos; Amadeo Hernández Bueno; Alvaro Portanet Hernández
- Starring: Bárbara Lennie; Luis Bermejo; José Sacristán; Lucía Pollán; Israel Elejalde; Elisabet Gelabert; Marisol Membrillo
- Cinematography: Santiago Racaj
- Edited by: Emma Tusell
- Production company: Aquí y Allí Films
- Distributed by: Avalon (Spain); Condor (France)
- Release dates: September 2014 (TIFF); 17 October 2014 (Spain); 12 August 2015 (France)
- Running time: 127 minutes
- Countries: Spain; France
- Language: Spanish

Magical Girl (titled La niña de fuego in France) is a 2014 neo-noir film written and directed by Carlos Vermut, and starring Bárbara Lennie, Luis Bermejo and José Sacristán. The plot tracks the events triggered by the decision of a father (Bermejo) to fulfill the secret wish of his dying 12-year-old otaku daughter (Pollán).

A Spanish-French co-production, the film made its world premiere at the 39th Toronto International Film Festival in September 2014, also screening at the 62nd San Sebastián International Film Festival, where it won the Golden Shell for Best Film and the Silver Shell for Best Director. Lennie also won the Goya Award for Best Actress for her performance.

== Plot ==
A math teacher reprimands a student named Bárbara for a note she purportedly wrote. After insulting the teacher, Bárbara plays a handtrick illusion on the teacher with the note.

A girl dancing to the sound of Japanese music faints in her bedroom. A man sells his belongings (books) at a used goods store and looks with interest at a jewelry store's display window, later arriving home to find the girl, Alicia, lying unconscious on the floor. Back home from the hospital, the man (Luis, Alicia's father), grants Alicia (known as Yukiko in her otaku circle) a number of wishes. Upon reading Alicia's diary, Luis commits to gifting Alicia a Magical Girl Yukiko costume costing €6,845, and asks a bar owner (Marisol) for money in order to satisfy the secret wish of his 12-year-old daughter Alicia (sick with leukemia). A desperate Luis decides to break the aforementioned shop window glass, but vomit falls on him from above just before breaking it.

A man and a woman (Bárbara) discuss in their bedroom, after which Bárbara pretends to ingest her medication. After taking a friends' baby in her arms, Bárbara jokes with throwing the baby out of the window. Bárbara wakes up at night and hurts her forehead with a mirror. After ingesting alcohol and pills, she vomits out the window on Luis, and invites him to her apartment so he can take a shower. Upon learning that Bárbara's husband is a rich psychiatrist and after presenting himself as an unemployed literature teacher named Pedro, Luis has sex with Bárbara.

After claiming to have recorded them having sex with his phone, Luis blackmails Bárbara into getting him €7,000, threatening her with telling her husband. Bárbara asks a madam named Ada for money, offering to prostitute herself, thereby getting a one-time job without penetration at Óliver Zoco's residence. Taken to a remote mansion by a chauffeur-driven car, Bárbara is asked there to remove her clothes and to remember a BDSM safeword ('hojalata') before entering a room.

Luis asks Bárbara to leave the money inside a Spanish Constitution book hosted in a public library near Puerta de Toledo. After gifting the dress to Alicia, Luis finds out that the set is missing the scepter, sold as an add-on. Luis then blackmails Bárbara again into giving him another €20,000. Bárbara offers to do a job behind Óliver's black lizard door, where unspeakable things are done, discouragement by Ada notwithstanding.

Introduced as Damián, the teacher from the opening scene (now an old man) does not want to leave prison, because he is afraid of seeing Bárbara again. Damián finds a badly wounded Bárbara lying on the stairs of his apartment and takes her in, calling an ambulance. Bárbara asks Damián to leave the Constitution in the public library. Bárbara's husband, introduced as Alfredo, thanks Damián for taking care of his wife. At the hospital, Bárbara falsely suggests to Damián that she has been raped by her blackmailer. After obtaining a gun, Damián follows Luis into a bar, introduces himself to him as a man sent to prison for having helped Bárbara, and provides Luis with the gun so he can kill him in plain sight, threatening to kill Luis' family otherwise. Failing to believe Luis' version of the events and convinced that Luis raped Bárbara, Damián kills Luis and the two other witnesses at the bar. Damián goes to Luis apartment to look for the latter's phone, meeting Alicia, fully dressed with the Yukiko Magical Girl dress and holding the scepter. Damián shoots her.

Damián visits Bárbara and tells her that he has taken care of everything, playing on her the same trick with the phone that she played on him with the note years ago.

== Cast ==
- Luis Bermejo as Luis
- José Sacristán as Damián
- Bárbara Lennie as Bárbara
- Lucía Pollán as Alicia
- Israel Elejalde as Alfredo
- Elisabet Gelabert as Ada
- Marisol Membrillo as Marisol
- Miquel Insua as Oliver
- Teresa Soria Ruano as Adela
- David Pareja as Javier
- Eva Llorach as Laura
- Javier Botet as Pepo
- Lorena Iglesias as Psychologist
- Julio Arrojo as Driver
- Alberto Chaves as Shopkeeper
- Julián Génisson as Jewellery shop assistant
- Marina Andruix as Bárbara child
- María Martín Cuevas as Baby

== Influences on the film ==
Carlos Vermut stated that the film was influenced by the popular dark magical girl anime Puella Magi Madoka Magica. Carlos stated he liked the story in Madoka and that "[he] received inspiration from the dark part of [....] "Madoka Magica", not just imitating, but matching it with the image I was thinking and putting it in Magical Girl."

== Production ==
A co-production among Spain and France (90%–10%), Magical Girl was produced by Aquí y Allí Films, with the participation of Films Distribution, Sabre Producciones, TVE and Canal+. Shooting locations in Madrid included Calle de Felipe Castro, Glorieta de Puerta de Toledo, Plaza del General Vara de Rey, and Calle de Claudio Coello.

== Release ==
The film was screened at the 2014 Toronto International Film Festival and the 2014 San Sebastián International Film Festival, where it won the Golden Shell. Distributed by Avalon, it was theatrically released in Spain on 17 October 2014. It opened in French theatres on 12 August 2015, under the title La niña de fuego.

== Reception ==
=== Critical response ===
On the review aggregator Rotten Tomatoes, 100% of 8 reviews are positive, with an average rating of 9.0/10.

Jonathan Holland of The Hollywood Reporter considered the film to be "a spare, austere and thoroughly contemporary noirish social critique constructed on rich emotional foundation".

Peter Debruge of Variety considered the lack of relatable human behavior the film, "an elaborately contrived, imagination-dependent dark comedy", to be both an asset and a weakness.

=== Accolades ===
Year	Award	Category	Nominee(s)	Result	Ref.
2014	62nd San Sebastián International Film Festival	Golden Shell for Best Film		Won	
2014	62nd San Sebastián International Film Festival	Silver Shell for Best Director	Carlos Vermut	Won	
2015	20th Forqué Awards	Best Fiction Picture		Nominated	
2015	20th Forqué Awards	Best Actress	Bárbara Lennie	Won	
2015	20th Forqué Awards	Best Actor	José Sacristán	Nominated	
2015	2nd Feroz Awards	Best Drama Film		Nominated	
2015	2nd Feroz Awards	Best Director	Carlos Vermut	Nominated	
2015	2nd Feroz Awards	Best Screenplay	Carlos Vermut	Won	
2015	2nd Feroz Awards	Best Main Actor	Luis Bermejo	Nominated	
2015	2nd Feroz Awards	Best Main Actress	Bárbara Lennie	Won	
2015	2nd Feroz Awards	Best Supporting Actor	José Sacristán	Won	
2015	2nd Feroz Awards	Best Trailer		Nominated	
2015	2nd Feroz Awards	Best Film Poster		Won	
2015	7th Gaudí Awards	Best European Film		Nominated	
2015	70th CEC Awards	Best Director	Carlos Vermut	Nominated	
2015	70th CEC Awards	Best Original Screenplay	Carlos Vermut	Nominated	
2015	70th CEC Awards	Best Actor	Luis Bermejo	Nominated	
2015	70th CEC Awards	Best Actress	Bárbara Lennie	Won	
2015	70th CEC Awards	Best Supporting Actor	José Sacristán	Nominated	
2015	29th Goya Awards	Best Film		Nominated	
2015	29th Goya Awards	Best Director	Carlos Vermut	Nominated	
2015	29th Goya Awards	Best Original Screenplay	Carlos Vermut	Nominated	
2015	29th Goya Awards	Best Actor	Luis Bermejo	Nominated	
2015	29th Goya Awards	Best Actress	Bárbara Lennie	Won	
2015	29th Goya Awards	Best Supporting Actor	José Sacristán	Nominated	
2015	29th Goya Awards	Best New Actor	Israel Elejalde	Nominated	

== See also ==
- List of Spanish films of 2014
