= Edén (film) =

- Theatrical release poster
- Directed by: Estefanía Cortés
- Written by: Estefanía Cortés
- Starring: Charlotte Vega; Marta Nieto; Ramón Barea; Israel Elejalde
- Edited by: Alfonso Cortés-Cabanillas
- Production companies: Montreux Entertainment; La Caña Brothers; La Colmena; El Edén AIE
- Distributed by: Syldavia
- Release dates: 24 October 2022 (Seminci); 28 October 2022 (Spain)
- Running time: 90 minutes
- Country: Spain
- Language: Spanish

Edén is a 2022 Spanish psychological drama film directed and written by Estefanía Cortés which stars Charlotte Vega alongside Marta Nieto, Ramón Barea, and Israel Elejalde.

== Plot ==
A young woman (Marina) moves to a remote centre run by a clandestine company set to commit suicide. There she meets three other people with different backgrounds (Lidia, Félix, and Victor).

== Cast ==
- Charlotte Vega as Marina
- Marta Nieto as Lidia
- Ramón Barea as Félix
- Israel Elejalde as Victor

== Production ==
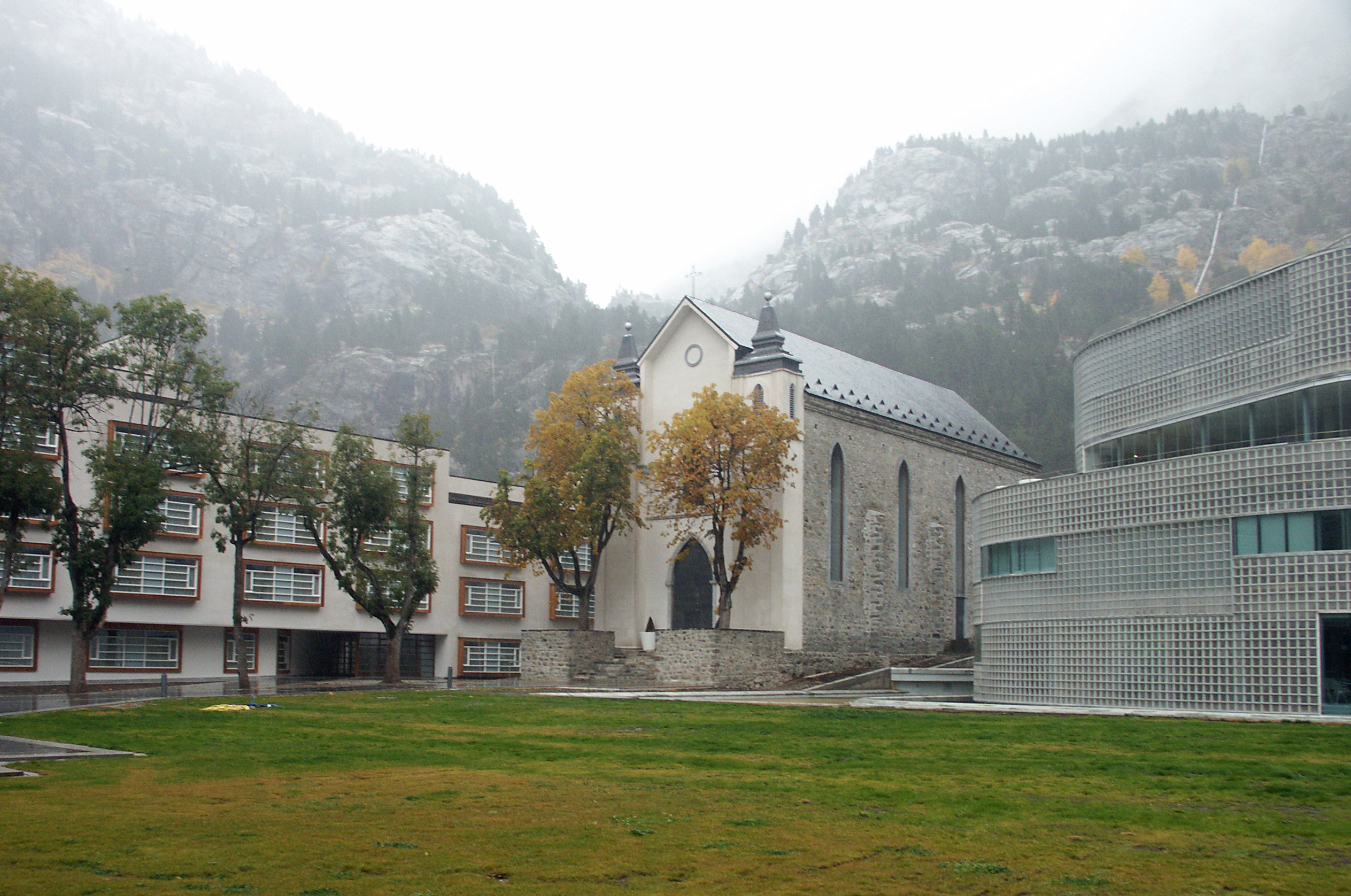
Footage was shot in the Baths of Panticosa, in the Aragonese Pyrenees.

Edén is a Montreux Entertainment, La Caña Brothers, La Colmena and El Edén AIE production, with participation of TVE and Aragón Televisión. It was fully shot in Aragon from October to November 2021, including the Baths of Panticosa in the province of Huesca and outdoor locations in the Pyrenees mountains.

== Release ==
The film had its world premiere in the 'Meeting Point' section of the 67th Valladolid International Film Festival (Seminci) on 24 October 2022. Distributed by Syldavia, it was theatrically released in Spain on 28 October 2022.

== Reception ==
Manuel J. Lombardo of Diario de Sevilla rated the film 2 out of 5 stars, considering that the film—a "flawed" attempt to either open a debate or reflect on euthanasia—ends up looking too much at its own navel and "those of creatures that, with the exception of the one played by Ramón Barea, look like laboratory robots in a sad, old-fashioned existentialist theatre performance".

Mikel G. Gurpegui of El Correo rated the film 1 out of 5 stars, underscoring how "the atmosphere created is not enough, some sequences border on the ridiculous and morbidity wins the battle against depth", with the more the protagonists talk, the more feigned it all sounds.

David Pardillos of Cinemanía rated the film 3 out of 5 stars, considering that even if the mise-en-scene could be too rough, the attempt to confront ourselves with such an important issue is laudable.

== See also ==
- List of Spanish films of 2022
