= Mauro Aragoni =

Italian film director and screenwriter (born 1988)

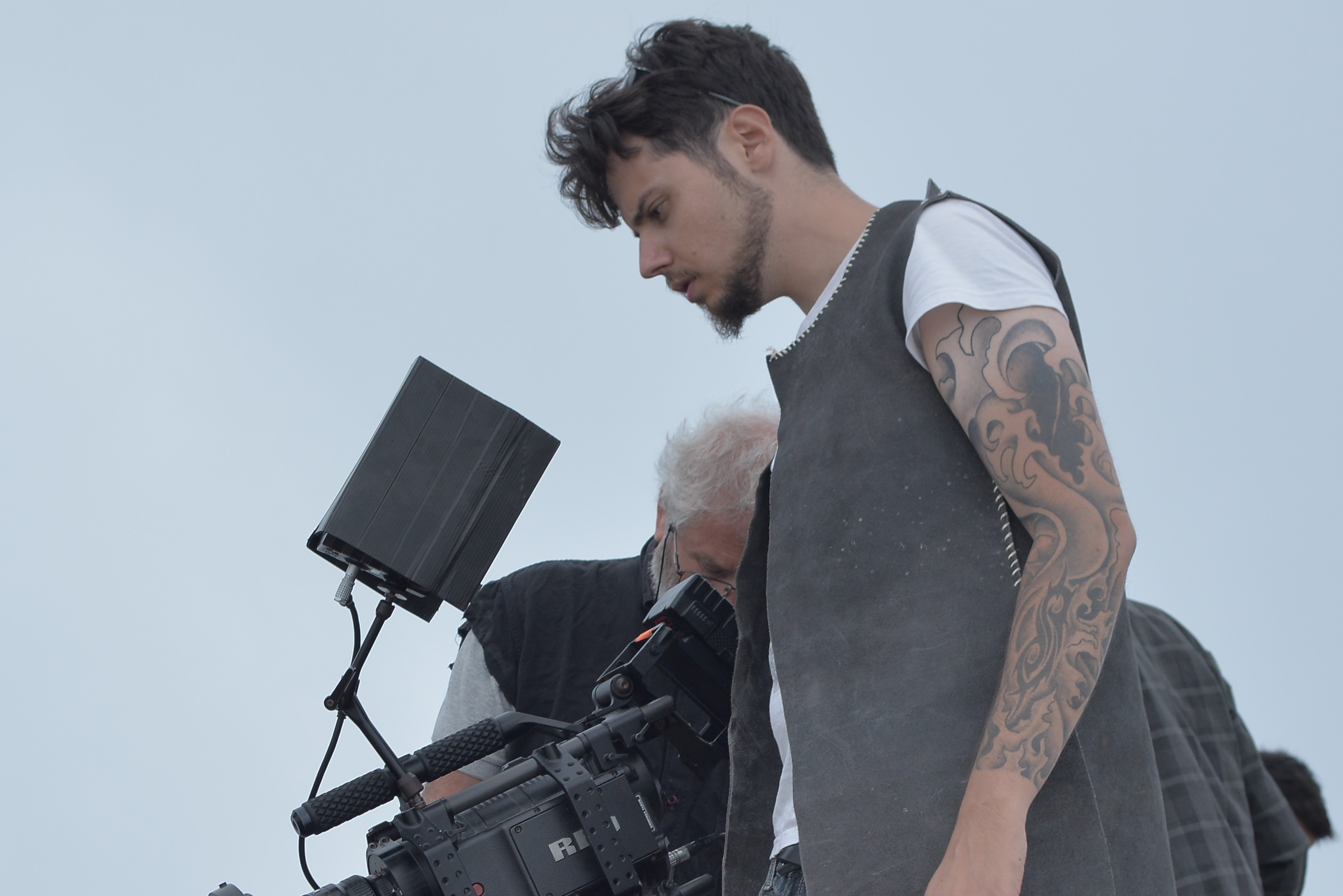
- Born: 10 March 1988 (age 38); Tortolì, Italy
- Occupations: director, screenwriter
- Years active: 2000–present

Mauro Aragoni (born 10 March 1988) is an Italian film director and screenwriter, best known for the TV series That Dirty Black Bag, which premiered on AMC+ in 2022.

== Biography ==
Mauro Aragoni began his career directing independent short films. In 2016, he directed Nuraghes S'Arena, a short film featuring the acting debut of rapper Salmo.

In 2022, he wrote and directed the "spaghetti Western" series That Dirty Black Bag, which was distributed on AMC+ and later made available on Netflix USA.

In 2024, Aragoni wrote a special issue of Dylan Dog for Sergio Bonelli Editore, titled L'oscuro messaggero (Italian for 'The Dark Messenger').

== Works ==
- Nuraghes S'Arena – short film (2016)
- That Dirty Black Bag – TV series (2022)
- Dylan Dog: L'oscuro messaggero – comic book (2024)
