= Let Us Prey (film) =

2014 horror film by Brian O'Malley

- Film Poster
- Directed by: Brian O'Malley
- Written by: Fiona Watson; David Cairns
- Produced by: Brendan McCarthy; John McDonnell; Eddie Dick
- Starring: Liam Cunningham; Pollyanna McIntosh; Bryan Larkin
- Cinematography: Piers McGrail
- Edited by: Tony Kearns
- Music by: Steve Lynch
- Production companies: Creative Scotland; Fantastic Films; Greenhouse Media Investment; Irish Film Board; Makar Productions
- Distributed by: Kaleidoscope Entertainment
- Release dates: 17 April 2014 (BIFFF); 12 June 2015
- Running time: 92 minutes
- Countries: United Kingdom; Ireland
- Language: English

Let Us Prey is a 2014 horror film directed by Brian O'Malley and written by Fiona Watson and David Cairns.

== Plot ==
A mysterious man arrives in a small town in Scotland where PC Rachel Heggie awakens from a nightmare about being abused as a child before heading out on patrol. Whilst on patrol, Heggie witnesses Francis "Caesar" Sargison's car strike the mystery man. He disappears, and Heggie arrests Caesar. At the police station, she is greeted by Sgt Jim Macready, who charges Caesar with reckless driving. Heggie radios PCs Jennifer Mundie and Jack Warnock to find the victim before taking Caesar to the cells, where he joins his teacher, Mr. Ralph Beswick, arrested for beating his wife.

Mundie and Warnock, having found the man that Caesar hit, bring him to the station, mute, covered in scratches and carrying only a notebook with lists of names. Heggie phones Dr. Duncan Hume to examine him; however, upon examination Hume experiences a flashback and attempts to kill his patient for supposedly knowing what Hume has done. Hume is placed in a cell, and the unknown man is identified as having the fingerprints of an old man who died over 20 years ago. He makes several references to Old Testament justice before Macready also suffers a flashback and angrily has Heggie and Mundie place him in cell six (and for this reason the character is named "Six" in the end credits, although never referred to as such by any other characters during the film). Mundie has a flashback to beating a prisoner with Warnock.

Macready has Mundie and Warnock go to Hume's house to find his wife before Macready drives to his own home. Heggie researches the names in Six's notebook, discovering they are all deceased criminals. In the cells, Six, who displays supernatural powers, quizzes Beswick about the true reason why he beats his wife. Unsatisfied with Beswick's answers, Six induces him to attempt suicide. Caesar alerts Heggie, who allows Hume to examine Beswick, who dies after claiming to know who Six is. Elsewhere, Mundie and Warnock enter Hume's house and find he has murdered his family. Macready is revealed to be a serial killer who seduces and then murders young men, as shown by several missing posters in the police station. He hurriedly disposes of a dismembered body in his fridge along with the body of one of the men shown on the posters, whom he had beaten to death in a drunken rage.

Hume helps Heggie carry Beswick upstairs, but he attacks her when she learns about his family. After restraining him, she returns him to his cell. Six reveals he knows about Heggie's childhood abuse, and, when she leaves, he offers Caesar redemption if he confesses to a second hit and run accident from earlier in the night when he ran over a young girl and left her to die. Mundie and Warnock return and drag Hume to interrogation, ignoring Caesar's attempt to confess. As Hume confesses to Mundie about killing his family out of nihilistic boredom with his career and a desire to unlock the secret of immortality, Warnock talks to Six and has a flashback to staging the suicide of the man he and Mundie had beaten. Enraged, Warnock rushes to interrogation and brutally kills Hume in front of Heggie and Mundie. Heggie is threatened into remaining silent.

Caesar confesses to Heggie about hitting the girl, but Six says it is too late for redemption, as the girl had died two minutes earlier where Caesar left her next to the road. Heggie also has a flashback and remembers that Six had distracted her childhood abuser, allowing her time to escape. Six informs her Mundie and Warnock are planning to kill her. Heggie fights Mundie and Warnock, who nearly succeed in strangling her, until the sudden return of Macready, now insane, wrapped in barbed wire, wielding a shotgun and quoting verses from the Bible. He shoots and kills Warnock, then wounds both Heggie and Mundie as they barricade themselves in the cells. While Macready sets the building on fire, Six makes references to his true identity, of losing an argument with "an old friend" about human sin, and being an outcast like Heggie. He offers to help her, but only if she asks him to. She refuses.

While escaping, Mundie slips and cuts her throat on a broken window and is killed by Macready's pressing of her throat further onto the broken glass with his rifle butt, and then Macready further wounds Heggie before killing Caesar with his gun after scarring his face. Heggie throws Macready's fuel can at him, which he accidentally shoots. Mortally wounded in the explosion, he quotes a final Bible verse. Heggie responds "Amen" and kills him by crushing his face with a battering ram. Heggie escapes the police station, and Six appears, unburnt, with his notebook, which he reveals has everybody's name inside. He crosses off every name except Heggie's and condemns the others to Hell for their various sins: Mundie and Warnock as “adulterers and betrayers who dare to weigh justice in their own hands” as the married Warnock had been having an affair with Mundie, Beswick as a hypocrite, Macready as a pervert, Hume as being “cowardly and vicious”, and Caesar for both hitting the girl with his car and being too weak to confess. Six reveals he is in love with Heggie and offers her a place at his side to seek vengeance on the guilty; she agrees, and they kiss.

== Cast ==
- Liam Cunningham as Six
- Pollyanna McIntosh as PC Rachel Heggie
- Bryan Larkin as PC Jack Warnock
- Hanna Stanbridge as PC Jennifer Mundie
- Douglas Russell as Sgt. Jim MacReady
- Niall Greig Fulton as Dr. Duncan Hume
- Jonathan Watson as Ralph Beswick
- Brian Vernel as Caesar Sargison
- James McCreadie as Mulvey
- Sophie Stephanie Farmer as young Rachel

== Production ==
Several scenes were rewritten at McIntosh's behest. She saw her character as strong and did not want Heggie to be viewed as a victim or in a sexualised way. The filmmakers were also careful not to depict Heggie's background of abuse exploitatively.

== Release ==
Let Us Prey premiered at the Brussels International Fantastic Film Festival. It was released on video-on-demand and DVD in the US on 26 May 2015. In the UK, it was released to video-on-demand on 28 September and on DVD on 19 October 2015.

Let Us Prey was released in Japan on 5 January 2016, with the title of popular anime Death Note, despite neither having anything to do with each other.

== Reception ==
Rotten Tomatoes, a review aggregator, reports that 83% of twelve surveyed critics gave the film a positive review; the average rating is 6.44/10. Tara Brady of The Irish Times rated it 3/5 stars and wrote that "splatter-hounds will get their money's worth". The Herald wrote the film starts off slowly and has weak dialogue, but praised Cunningham's acting and the occasionally cartoonish gore, which they said make it fun. Harry Guerin of Raidió Teilifís Éireann rated it 4/5 stars and praised the acting of both McIntosh and Cunningham, who he said was perfectly cast. Ken W. Hanley of Fangoria rated it 3/4 stars and wrote, "While the film doesn't quite contain the cinematic magic or gravitas to be an out-and-out genre classic, Let Us Prey is one of the more satisfying and utterly savage horror films in recent memory". Andrew Marshall of Starburst rated it 10/10 stars and wrote, "Striking a perfect balance of suspense, violence, humour, story and action, Let Us Prey feels at once classic and modern". Reviews from Dread Central, Bloody Disgusting, and Twitch Film complimented the film on its atmosphere, visuals, and initial mystery but criticized the film's second half as comparatively disappointing.
