= Céline Buckens =

Belgian-British actress (born 1996)

- Born: 9 August 1996 (age 29); Brussels, Belgium
- Education: London School of Economics
- Occupation: Actress
- Years active: 2010–present

Céline Buckens (born 9 August 1996) is a Belgian-British actress. After appearing in the film War Horse (2011), she went on to play Mia MacDonald in the Netflix series Free Rein (2017–2019) and Sophie Mercer in the Cinemax series Warrior (2020). For her performance in the BBC drama Showtrial (2021), she was nominated for a British Academy Television Award and an International Emmy Award. She also starred in the Paramount+ series The Ex-Wife (2022–2025) and The Castaways (2023), and the Channel 4 series Suspect (2024).

== Early life and education ==
Buckens was born on 9 August 1996 in Brussels and moved to England at a young age, where she grew up in Kensington, London. Her parents worked as an academic and a fund manager.

Buckens attended Thomas's London Day School and St Mary's, Ascot. She then studied history at the London School of Economics and Political Science. She appeared in Free Rein while completing her course. She was also a debutante at the Bal des débutantes in Paris.

== Career ==
Buckens' acting career began when she portrayed Émilie in Steven Spielberg's 2011 film War Horse, a role she won after two auditions. The character is a young French girl who lives on a farm with her grandfather after she lost her parents in the war. In 2015, Buckens starred in a short film titled The Rain Collector, in the role of Vanessa Kentworth. From 2017 to 2019, Buckens starred in the Netflix drama series Free Rein as Mia MacDonald. She also appeared in an episode of the ITV drama Endeavour in 2017, as Daisy Bennett. In 2018, Buckens starred in Ne M'oublie Pas (English: Forget Me Not), a French short film, as lead character Elsa. In 2019, she appeared in the drama thriller film The Good Liar as Annalise. That same year, it was announced that Buckens had joined the main cast of the Cinemax action series Warrior. She portrayed the role of Sophie Mercer in the second series.

In 2021, Buckens portrayed Talitha Campbell in the BBC legal drama Showtrial. For her portrayal of the role, she was nominated for the British Academy Television Award for Best Supporting Actress, as well as receiving a nomination for the International Emmy Award for Best Actress. Buckens also made her directorial debut in 2021, directing the short film Prangover, for which she was awarded Best Director at the 2021 North East International Film Festival. In 2022, Buckens starred in the Paramount+ series The Ex-Wife. It was renewed in 2024, with Buckens returning for the second series. In 2023, she signed on to star in another Paramount+ series, The Castaways. In 2025, she is set to star in the upcoming Hulu thriller series The Kollective. In 2025, she was cast as a series regular in Talamasca: The Secret Order, playing a character named Doris Williamson, "an old soul who lives with a coven of witches on a houseboat". In 2026, she appeared in the action film Shelter.

== Filmography ==
=== Film ===
Year	Film	Role	Notes	Ref.
2011	War Horse	Émilie		
2015	The Rain Collector	Vanessa Kentworth	Short film	
2018	Ne M'oublie Pas	Elsa	Short film (AKA: Forget Me Not)	
2018	Free Rein: The 12 Neighs of Christmas	Mia MacDonald	Direct-to-video	
2019	Free Rein: Valentine's Day	Mia MacDonald	Direct-to-video	
2019	The Good Liar	Annalise		
2022	Express		Short film	
2026	Shelter	Maddison		

=== Television ===
Year	Title	Role	Notes	Ref.
2017	Endeavour	Student Nurse Daisy Bennett	Episode: "Lazaretto"	
2017–2019	Free Rein	Mia MacDonald	Main role	
2020	Warrior	Sophie Mercer	Main role	
2020	Bridgerton	Kitty Langham	Episode: "Oceans Apart"	
2021	Showtrial	Talitha Campbell	Main role	
2022–2025	The Ex-Wife	Tasha	Main role	
2023	The Castaways	Erin Holme	Main role	
2024	Suspect	Sapphire (Emma)	Main role	
2025	The Kollective		Main role	
2025	Talamasca: The Secret Order	Doris Williamson	Main role	

== Selected theatre credits ==
Year	Title	Role	Notes	Ref.
2025	Safe Space	Annabelle	Chichester Festival Theatre	

== Awards and nominations ==
Year	Award	Category	Nominated work	Result	Ref.
2012	Empire Awards	Best Female Newcomer	War Horse	Nominated	
2021	North East International Film Festival	Best Director – Short Film	Prangover	Won	
2022	British Academy Television Awards	Best Supporting Actress	Showtrial	Nominated	
2022	TV Choice Awards	Best Actress	Showtrial	Nominated	
2022	International Emmy Awards	Best Actress	Showtrial	Nominated	
2024	New Renaissance Film Festival	Best Drama Short Film	The Debt	Won	
