= Ricardo Gómez (actor) =

Spanish actor

- Gómez in 2026
- Born: Ricardo Parrondo Gómez; 25 February 1994 (age 32); Madrid, Spain
- Occupation: Actor

Ricardo Parrondo Gómez (born 25 February 1994), known professionally as Ricardo Gómez, is a Spanish television, film and stage actor. His early success as an actor is intrinsic to his 17-year long performance playing the character of Carlitos Alcántara in the TV series Cuéntame cómo pasó, between 2001 and 2018.

== Biography ==
Ricardo Gómez was born in Madrid on 25 February 1994; his family originally lived in Santiago de Compostela, Galicia, before moving to the Spanish capital.

He joined the cast of the TV series Cuéntame cómo pasó (aired on La 1 since 2001) for the role of Carlos "Carlitos" Alcántara, the younger sibling of the Alcántara family. He was 7 years old when he first performed the character.

During the time he belonged to the cast of Cuéntame, Gómez also performed in other mediums, including his role in José Luis Garci's Tiovivo c. 1950 (2004), short films and stage plays. His breakout performance in a feature film came with 1898, Our Last Men in the Philippines, a 2016 historical war drama film based on the Siege of Baler. He played José, one of the besieged Spanish soldiers garrisoned in the Church of Baler. His performance earned him a nomination for the Goya Award for Best New Actor.

Gómez decided to leave Cuéntame in 2018, after 17 years, 348 episodes and 19 seasons.

Following his exit from Cuéntame, Gómez took part in different theatrical plays such as Mammon (which earned him the Fotograma de Plata Award for Best Stage Actor) and Rojo, and starred in the series Unauthorized Living, where he plays Alejandro, a gay teacher and politician.

He also joined the cast of three feature films, The Replacement, Mía y Moi and More the Merrier, a comedy. The Replacement is a story set in 1982 Spain, in which Gómez plays a police inspector destined to a coastal town where people has normalised the presence of hidden Nazis (a plot inspired by the actual stories of Nazi colonies in the Costa Blanca). Mía y Moi, in which Gómez co-stars with Bruna Cusí, is the story about two siblings who have suffered domestic abuse reuniting in the rural family house after the death of their mother. As of December 2020, amid the COVID-19 pandemic, the filming of the three films was completed and they were expected to be released in the future, tentatively in 2021. In 2021, he starred in the Spanish on-stage adaptation of The Pillowman (El hombre almohada) as Michal.

In 2026, Gómez shot his directorial debut film, Una familia.

== Filmography ==
=== Film ===
Year	Title	Role	Notes	Ref.
2004	Tiovivo c. 1950	Acisclito		
2016	1898, Los últimos de Filipinas (1898, Our Last Men in the Philippines)	Soldado José		
2021	Mía y Moi	Moi		
2021	El sustituto (The Replacement)	Andrés Expósito		
2021	Donde caben dos (More the Merrier)	Víctor		
2022	La casa entre los cactus (The House Among the Cactuses)	Rafa		
2024	Soy Nevenka (I'm Nevenka)	Lucas		
2027	Una familia	—N/a	Director	

=== Television ===
Year	Title	Role	Notes	Ref.
2001–18	Cuéntame cómo pasó	Carlos Alcántara		
2016	El padre de Caín	Daniel		
2018	Vivir sin permiso (Unauthorized Living)	Alejandro Lamas		
2022	La ruta (The Route)	Sento		

== Accolades ==
Year	Award	Category	Work	Result	Ref(s)
2017	72nd CEC Medals	Best New Actor	1898, Our Last Men in the Philippines	Nominated	
2017	31st Goya Awards	Best New Actor	1898, Our Last Men in the Philippines	Nominated	
2017	26th Actors and Actresses Union Awards	Best New Actor	1898, Our Last Men in the Philippines	Nominated	
2019	69th Fotogramas de Plata	Best Stage Actor	Mammón	Won	
2022	9th Feroz Awards	Best Actor in a Film	The Replacement	Nominated	
2023	10th Feroz Awards	Best Supporting Actor in a TV Series	The Route	Nominated	
2024	25th Iris Awards	Best Actor	The Route	Nominated	
2026	13th Feroz Awards	Best Main Actor in a Series	Fate	Nominated	
