= Charlotte Vega =

Spanish actress (born 1994)

- Born: Charlotte Elizabeth Vega; 10 February 1994 (age 32); Madrid, Spain
- Occupation: Actress
- Years active: 2010–present

Charlotte Elizabeth Vega (born 10 February 1994) is a Spanish actress, best known for her role in the 2014 Spanish film The Misfits Club, the lead role in the 2017 Irish film The Lodgers, and main roles in two television series during 2015: season 3 of the Spanish series Velvet and the single season of the Spanish-British co-production The Refugees. She also played the lead role in the 2021 film Wrong Turn.

== Early life ==
Charlotte Vega was born in Madrid and raised in London. Her parents are both British-born, although her paternal grandparents were from Andalusia. As a child, her father spoke Spanish to Charlotte and her brother, while her mother spoke English. When asked about her background, she said in a 2018 interview:

"I feel very Spanish at times and then other times I'll feel very British. Sometimes Spanish people can be very touchy and overly friendly and I can feel a bit more distant. Other times, I'll be with British people and think, oh they're very cold and distant and need some more Spanish in them!"

After enjoying improv classes, she left equestrian school at age 17 to focus on her acting career.

== Filmography ==
=== Film ===
Year	Title	Role	Notes
2012	Rec 3: Genesis	Dama de Honor 2	
2013	Los inocentes	Eve	
2013	Another Me	Monica Meldrum	
2014	The Misfits Club	Valeria	
2017	Danielle	Danielle	Short film
2017	The Bookshop	Kattie	
2017	Proyecto tiempo	Eva (Joven)	
2017	The Lodgers	Rachel	
2017	American Assassin	Katrina Harper	
2017	Provenance	Sophia	
2018	La Banda	Alicia	
2020	Mosquito State	Lena del Alcázar	
2021	Wrong Turn	Jennifer "Jen" Shaw	
2022	Burial	Lt. Brana Brodskaya	
2022	Edén	Marina	
2024	Utopia	Alexis	
2025	man with no past	Morgan	

=== Television ===
Year	Title	Role	Notes
2013–2014	El secreto de Puente Viejo	Rita Aranda	Main role; 186 episodes
2014–2015	The Refugees	Sofía	Main role; 7 episodes
2015	Velvet	Lucía Márquez	Main role; 12 episodes
2016	Lo que escondían sus ojos	Carmen Díez de Rivera	Television mini-series
2020	Warrior Nun	Zori	Recurring role; 4 episodes
2023	Who Is Erin Carter?	Penelope	
2023	The Castaways	Amber	
