= Ramona Lovin =

Romanian politician (born 1980)

Member of the Chamber of Deputies
- Incumbent
- Assumed office 21 December 2024
- Constituency: Diaspora

Personal details
- Born: 1 February 1980 (age 46) Neamț County, Romania
- Party: Alliance for the Union of Romanians (AUR)

Ramona Lovin (born 1 February 1980) is a Romanian politician and member of the Chamber of Deputies since 2024 from the Alliance for the Union of Romanians party.

Lovin was born on 1 February 1980 in Neamț County, Romania. In 2003, Lovin moved to Italy. She was the chair of the AUR Italy organisation. She returned to Romania after 18 years of living in Italy.

== Political career ==
In the 2020 Romanian parliamentary election, Lovin was the AUR nominee for Diaspora, but she was not elected. As of March 2024, Lovin was the deputy secretary-general of the AUR party's National Bureau, being one of the six highest-ranking women in the party. She had held this position since at least March 2022.

=== Deputy (2024–present) ===
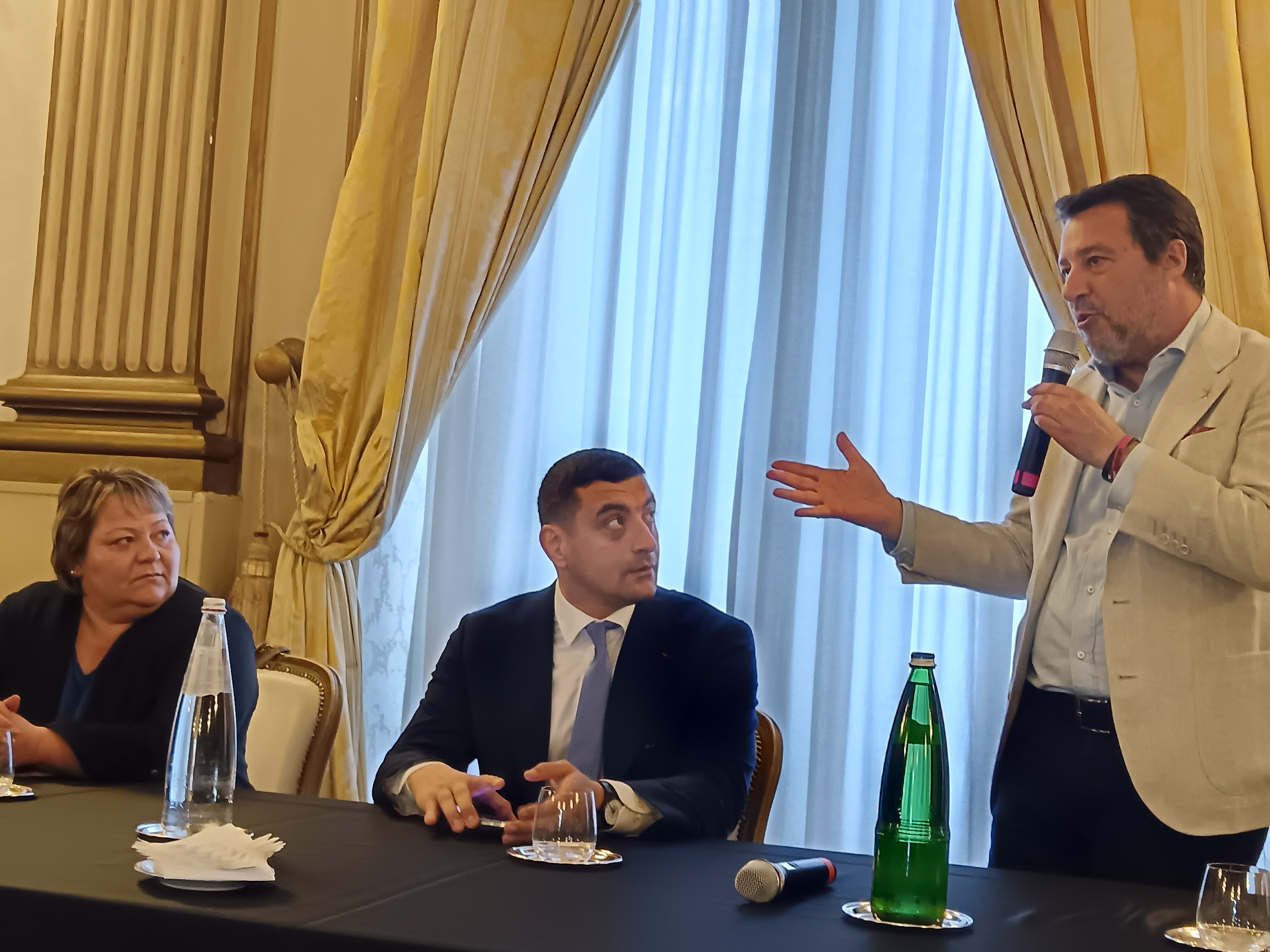
Lovin with George Simion and Matteo Salvini in Rome, 14 May 2025

In the 2024 Romanian parliamentary election, Lovin was elected as a member of the Chamber of Deputies for the Romanian diaspora, taking office on 21 December. As a deputy, she is the vice-president of the Chamber of Deputies Commission for the Romanian communities outside of Romania's borders, as well as the secretary of the Chamber of Deputies Italy friendship group.

She is also a supporter of the Unification of Moldova and Romania.

== See also ==
- Parliament of Romania
- Romanians in Italy
