= Heaven (Romanian band) =

Romanian pop-dance girl group

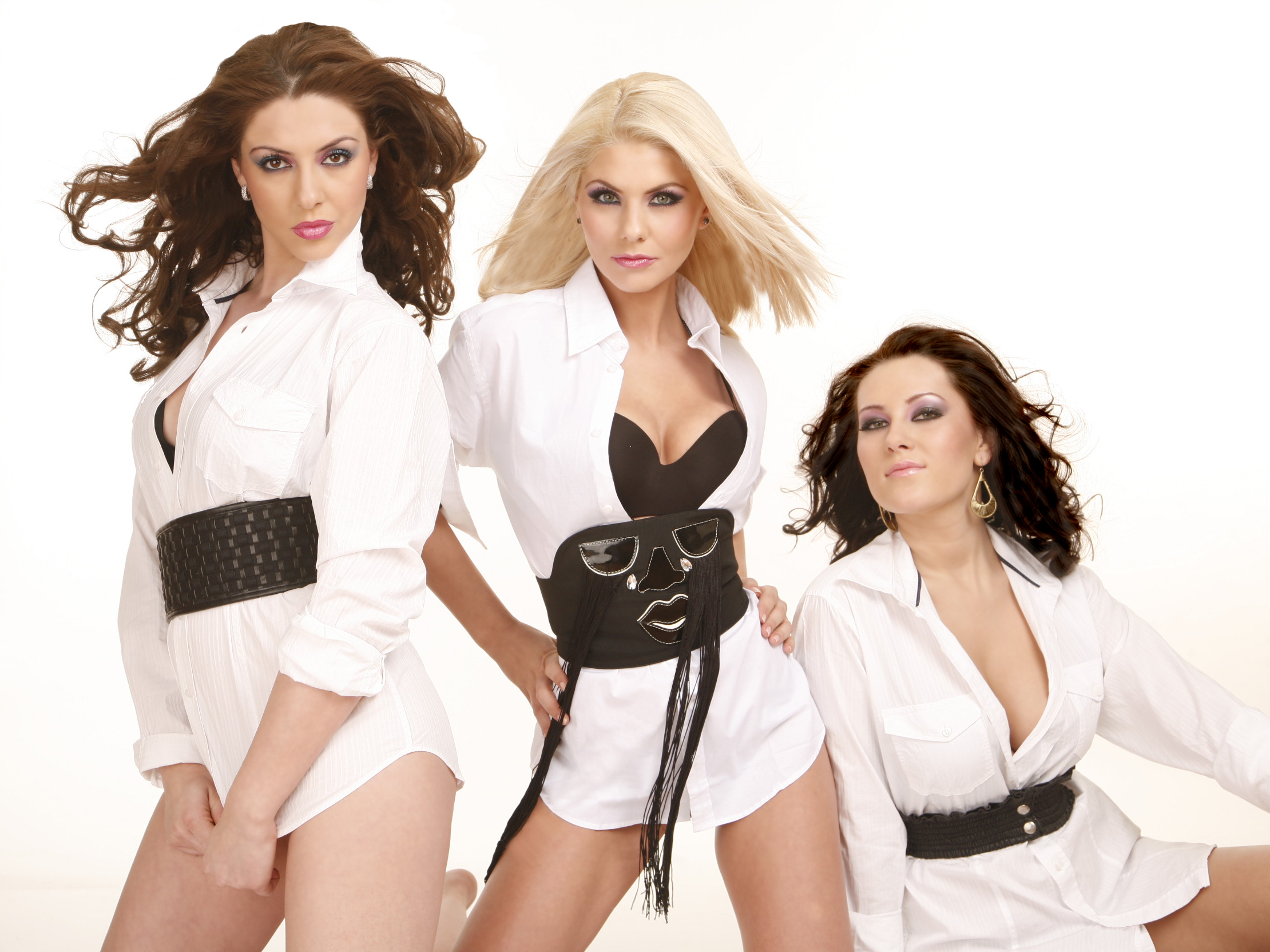
- Heaven posing throughout a photo shoot in 2010

Background information
- Origin: Vaslui, Romania
- Genres: Dance-pop
- Years active: 2005–2012
- Labels: Heaven Artist Company (formerly); Cat Music (2005-2007)
- Members: Adina Postelnicu; Roxana Postelnicu; Aliana Roșca
- Past members: Roxana Spoială
- Website: www.trupaheaven.com (in Romanian)

Heaven is a Romanian dance-pop girl group comprising lead singer Adina Postelnicu alongside her sister Roxana and Aliana Roșca. Formed in early 2005 in Vaslui, the band was launched into local recognition following the release of their debut single, named Pentru totdeauna, which peaked at number 24 on the Romanian charts. Heaven's debut album, titled O Parte Din Rai, was released in Romania in spring 2006 and has been compiled under the auspices of Cat Music.

In 2008, after just one album and some initial success, Roxana Spoială departed and since the introduction of Aliana Roșca the band was on a new studio album, titled So Lonely, whose official release was scheduled for November 2010.

== History ==
=== 2005–2008: Formation and commercial success ===
Formed in early 2005 in Vaslui, Heaven was eventually managed by Radu Groza who helped them in signing a contract with Cat Music. The band was launched into local recognition following the release of their debut single, named “Pentru totdeauna”, which peaked at number 24 on the Romanian charts. Same year later they started promoting a new song, titled “Du-ma pe o stea”, which brought them back into the spotlight. Heaven's debut album, named O Parte Din Rai, was released in Romania in spring 2006; being compiled under the auspices of Cat Music, the record contains the two singles promoted before, but also some new tracks produced by Gabi Huiban. Simultaneously Heaven started promoting a new single, “O Parte Din Rai”, whose military-themed video costed approximately 10.000 $. As a reward for its commercial success, the band received the "Best New Act" prize at the 2006 MTV Romania Music Awards.

In early 2007 Heaven collaborated with the American pop band No Mercy on a new single called “Let's Dance”. At the end of the same year Heaven received a new MTV RMA award, this time for its website. Gradually some management issues appeared and throughout 2008 one of its original members, Roxana Spoială, left the group in order to pursue a solo career; furthermore, Heaven parted ways with Radu Groza and Cat Music. Simultaneously the band promoted a new single, called “Kiss Me”, which enjoyed moderate success.

=== 2009–2010: Recent activity ===
Spoială was eventually replaced by Aliana Roșca and Heaven started working with Costi Ioniţă, a well-known Romanian producer. Eventually they released a single, entitled "Sexy Girl" (composed by Alexandru Pelin, Gabriel Huiban, Deaconu Dan Andrei and promoted under the management of Heaven Artist Company), which has received favorable reactions from both the public and press. The track has topped the Maltese and Cypriot charts for several weeks in summer 2010 and shortly after the band started touring the Mediterranean region. Since late 2009 the band has been working on a new studio album, titled So Lonely, whose official release is scheduled for November 2010. In late 2010 Heaven performed in the U.S., in front of the Romanian diaspora.

== Discography ==
=== Studio albums ===
- O parte din rai (2006)

=== Singles ===
- Pentru totdeauna (2005)
- Du-mă pe o stea (2005)
- O Parte Din Rai (2006)
- Let's Just Dance feat. No Mercy (2007)
- Kiss Me (2008)
- So Lonely (2009)
- Sexy Girl feat. Glance (2010)
- Dynamite (2011)
- Party feat. Nonis (2011)
- Sunshine (2012)
- învelește-mă cu tine (2012)
- Viața-i frumoasă (2013)
- Good times feat. Glance (2013)
- Isteria feat. Glance (2013)

== Awards ==
Year	Award	Category	Nominated work	Result	Note
2006	Romanian Music Awards	Best New Act	“Pentru totdeauna”	Won	
2007	Romanian Top Hits	Girls - The Best Hit	“O Parte Din Rai”	Nominated	
2007	Romanian Top Hits	Public's favourite act (voted by the romanian diaspora in Turin)	—	Won	
2007	Romanian Music Awards	Best Website	trupaheaven.com	Won	
