= Sexy Girl =

Sexy Girl may refer to:

- "Sexy Girl" (Glenn Frey song) (1984)
- "Sexy Girl" (Sabrina song) (1986)
- "Sexy Girl" (Snow song) (1995)
- "Sexy Girl" (Heaven song) (2010)
- "Sexy Girl", original title for "SG" (song) by DJ Snake, Ozuna, Megan Thee Stallion and Lisa (2021)
- "Sexy Girl", a song by Dareysteel (2003)
- Sexy Girl, the Italian release of the film Come Dance with Me! (1959)

== See also ==
- Sexy Lady (disambiguation)
