= Romanians in the United Kingdom =

Group of foreigners in the country

- Distribution of Romanian citizens in England, Northern Ireland and Wales by local authority

Total population
- Romanian-born residents in the United Kingdom: 557,554 – 0.8% (2021/22 Census) (Note: Does not include ethnic Romanians born in the United Kingdom or those with Romanian ancestry); England: 530,320– 0.9% (2021); Scotland: 12,102 – 0.2% (2022); Wales: 8,520 – 0.3% (2021); Northern Ireland: 6,612 – 0.3% (2021); Romanian citizens/passports held: 550,298 (England and Wales only, 2021)

Regions with significant populations
- London (All over London particularly North of the river), Birmingham, Coventry, Luton, Doncaster, Northampton, Milton Keynes, Grays

Languages
- British English and Romanian

Religion
- Romanian Orthodox, Roman Catholic, Greek Catholic, Protestant, Judaism

Related ethnic groups
- Romanians; Romanian Americans; Romanian Canadians; Romanian Australians; Romanian Italians; Romanian Germans; Romanian Spanish; Romanian French people

Romanians in the United Kingdom (Romanian: Românii din Regatul Unit) refers to Romanian immigrants in the United Kingdom, both citizens and non-citizens, along with British citizens of Romanian ancestry. The number of Romanian-born people resident in the UK has risen from 83,168 at the time of the 2011 United Kingdom census to 557,554 at the time of the 2021 United Kingdom census.

Romanian-born population by region and country
Region / Country	Population	%	Largest community
England	530,320	???%	—N/a
Greater London	175,991	???%	London Borough of Harrow – 21,082 (???%)
South East	74,693	???%	Southampton – 3,794 (???%)
East of England	72,281	???%	Luton – 8,666 (???%)
West Midlands	56,425	???%	Birmingham – 12,238 (???%)
East Midlands	44,921	???%	West Northamptonshire – 11,630 (???%)
North West	33,918	???%	Liverpool – 3,493 (???%)
Yorkshire and The Humber	32,912	???%	Doncaster – 6,001 (???%)
South West	31,583	???%	Bournemouth, Christchurch and Poole – 3,952 (???%)
North East	7,596	???%	Newcastle – 2,155 (???%)
Scotland	12,102	???%	Glasgow – 1,830 (???%)
Wales	8,520	???%	Cardiff – 1,563 (???%)
Northern Ireland	6,612	???%	??? – ??? (???%)
Figures based on the 2021 United Kingdom Census

Romanians constitute the fourth largest group of immigrants in England and Wales as of 2021, only behind those from Pakistan, Poland, and India. The decadal growth of 576% was the highest of any immigrant group and was driven by the relaxation of work restrictions. Furthermore, as of late 2022, given the big rise of Romanian immigrants to the United Kingdom, the Romanian language became the third most spoken language in the UK after English and Polish.

== History, population, and settlement ==
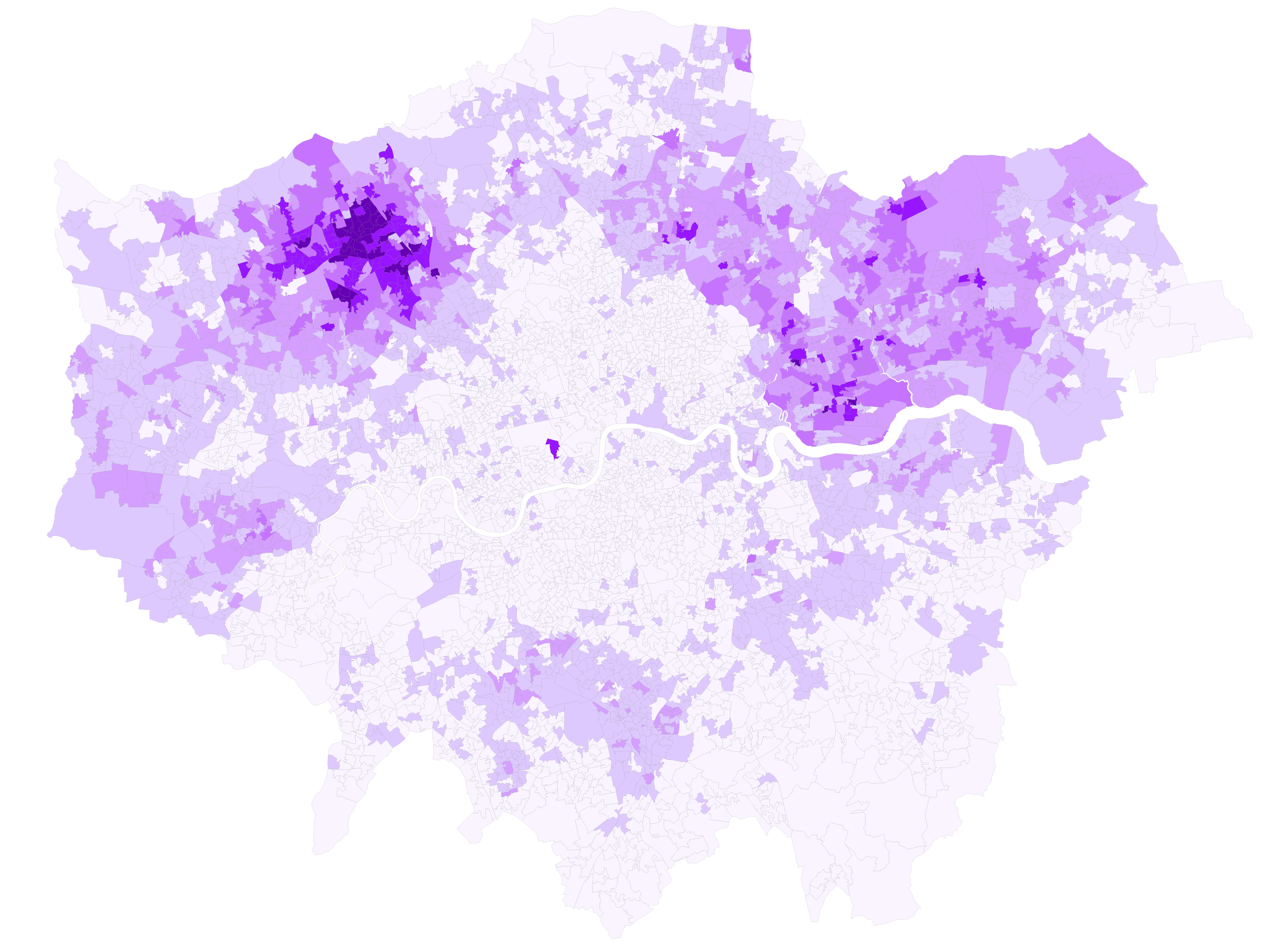
A map showing the distribution of Romanian passport holders in Greater London in 2021. Over 30% of Romanian citizens in the UK live in London. 0.0%-0.99% 1%-2.99% 3%-5.99% 6%-9.99% 10%-14.99% 15% and greater

White Romanian population pyramid in 2021 (in England and Wales)

The small number of Romanians that first arrived in Britain were primarily Jews fleeing persecution during the Second World War. The activities of the Romanian exiles started in 1941, through the effort of individuals such as Ambassador Viorel Tilea, Major George Emil Iliescu, and legal counselor Ecaterina Iliescu. They founded the Anglo-Romanian Refugee Committee (ARRC) in 1948. The Free Romanian Orthodox Church was active in parallel to the ARRC between 1950 and 1955, under the leadership of Father Gildau, with a parish committee chaired by Mihai Carciog. This later transformed into the 'Romanian Orthodox Women's Association in the UK', which, in turn, became in 1956 the British-Romanian Association – also known under its Romanian name of ACARDA ("Asociația Culturală a Românilor din Anglia") – through the initiative of a representative group of individuals from the small Romanian community, including Ion Rațiu, Horia Georgescu, George Ross, and Leonard Kirschen, Marie-Jeanne Livezeanu, Gladys Wilson, Sanda Cârciog, and Mihai Cârciog.

Ion Rațiu was the President of the British-Romanian Association between 1965 and 1985, followed by Iolanda Costide between 1985 and 1996. Rațiu became honorary president of the organisation in 1985.

At the time of the 2001 Census, 7,631 Romanian-born people were residing in the UK. In the 2011 Census, the Romanian-born population grew to 83,168 people throughout the UK, with 79,687 in England and Wales, 2,387 in Scotland, and 1,094 in Northern Ireland. The Office for National Statistics (ONS) estimated that, in 2012, 101,000 Romanian-born people were resident in the UK. By 2019, this estimate had risen to 427,000. This estimate fell to 345,000 in 2020.

The 2021 census recorded 530,320 Romanian-born people resident in England, 8,520 in Wales, and 6,612 in Northern Ireland.

As of 2021, approximately 1,350,640 Romanians had applied to the UK government's post-Brexit European Union Settlement Scheme, with 670,560 receiving pre-settled status and 435,720 receiving settled status. However, the ONS notes that not all applicants to the EUSS will be resident in the UK.

A particularly concentrated community exists in the Edgware-London suburb of Burnt Oak which has gained the nickname "Little Romania". Large communities also exist in the London Boroughs of Brent and Newham and in Northampton outside of London.

Historical population
Year	Pop.	±%
2001	7,631	—
2004	14,000	+83.5%
2005	17,000	+21.4%
2006	17,000	+0.0%
2007	24,000	+41.2%
2008	42,000	+75.0%
2009	59,000	+40.5%
2010	82,000	+39.0%
2011	83,168	+1.4%
2012	106,000	+27.5%
2013	136,000	+28.3%
2014	170,000	+25.0%
2015	220,000	+29.4%
2016	310,000	+40.9%
2017	390,000	+25.8%
2018	392,000	+0.5%
2019	427,000	+8.9%
2020	345,000	−19.2%
2021	557,554	+61.6%
Note: Besides for 2001, 2011, and 2021 when a census of the population took place, figures are ONS estimates of the number of Romanian-born residents. Figure given is the central estimate. See the source for 95% confidence intervals. Source:

Evolution of the number of Romanian nationals living in the UK (2010–2017)

== Culture ==
Most Romanians belong to the Romanian Orthodox Church religion and there are several Romanian Orthodox churches throughout the UK, such as those in Aberdeen, Ballymena, Birmingham, Boston, Bristol, Cambridge, Cardiff, Caterham, Edinburgh, Glasgow, Leeds, Liverpool, London, Luton, Northampton, Norwich, Nottingham, Oxford, or Poole.

== Social issues ==
Around 75 per cent of women trafficked to the UK are from Romania, with the majority being victims of sexual exploitation. In October 2020, an online summit was held to discuss the problem. Ahead of the event, the chair of the All-Party Parliamentary Group on commercial sexual exploitation, Dame Diana Johnson, argued that "The industrial-scale sexual exploitation of Romanian women by UK men is a national scandal".

Romanians in the UK have faced discrimination and xenophobic abuse, and were targets of some hate crimes following the Brexit referendum. In the autumn of 2019, the Romanian government launched an advertising campaign to attract emigrants back to Romania, suggesting that a million jobs awaited them. In October 2019, Minister of Labour and Social Justice (Romanian: Ministrul Muncii și Justiției Sociale) at the time Marius-Constantin Budăi told the ITV that he wished for all overseas Romanians to come home as soon as possible.

== Notable Britons of Romanian descent ==
- Ikechi Anya, footballer
- Zeev Aram, furniture and interior designer (OBE)
- Alma Cogan, singer
- Jimmy Cornell, yachtsman, bestselling author of World Cruising Routes
- Steven Berkoff, actor and author
- John Bercow, politician
- Maria Björnson, theatre designer
- Octav Botnar, businessman
- Alexandra Bulat, academic and county councillor
- Alina Cojocaru, ballet dancer
- Theo Dan, rugby player
- George Constantinescu, scientist, engineer and inventor
- Moses Gaster, scholar
- Miron Grindea, literary journalist (OBE)
- Rosemary Harris, actress
- Michael Howard, politician
- George Hurst, music conductor
- Sir George Iacobescu, chief executive of the Canary Wharf Group (CBE)
- Irina Lăzăreanu, model
- Jeff Leach, comedian
- Anamaria Marinca, actress
- Micachu, singer, songwriter and composer
- Nelly Miricioiu, opera singer
- David Mitrany, scholar
- Paul Neagu, artist
- Emma Raducanu, tennis player (MBE)
- Sir Roy Redgrave, army officer (KBE)
- Ion Rațiu, politician
- Solomon Schechter, rabbi
- Constantin Silvestri, music conductor
- Peter Solley, pianist
- Martin Sorrell, businessman
- Monty Sunshine, jazz clarinetist
- Viorel Tilea, diplomat (CBE)

== Gallery ==
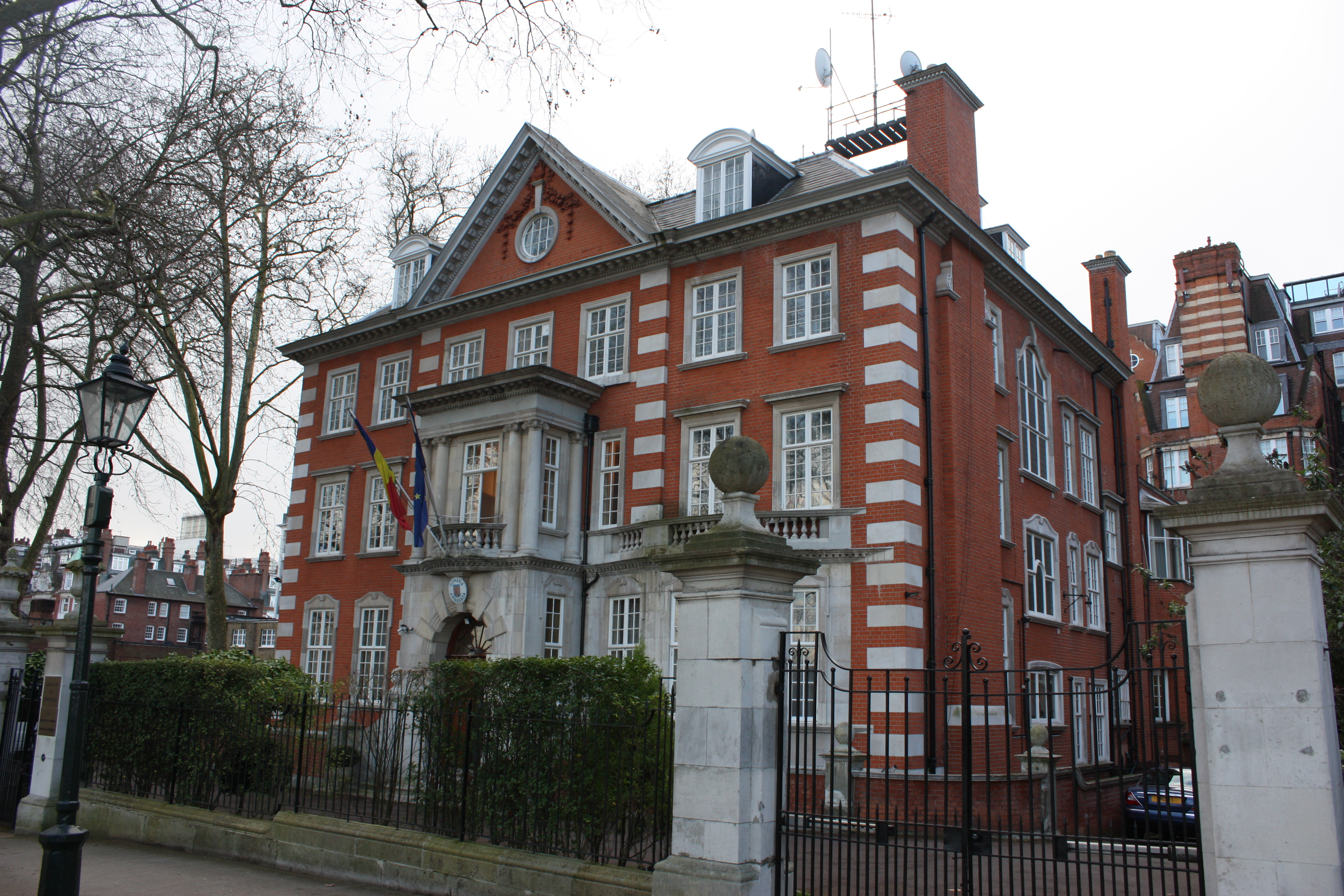
The Embassy of Romania in London

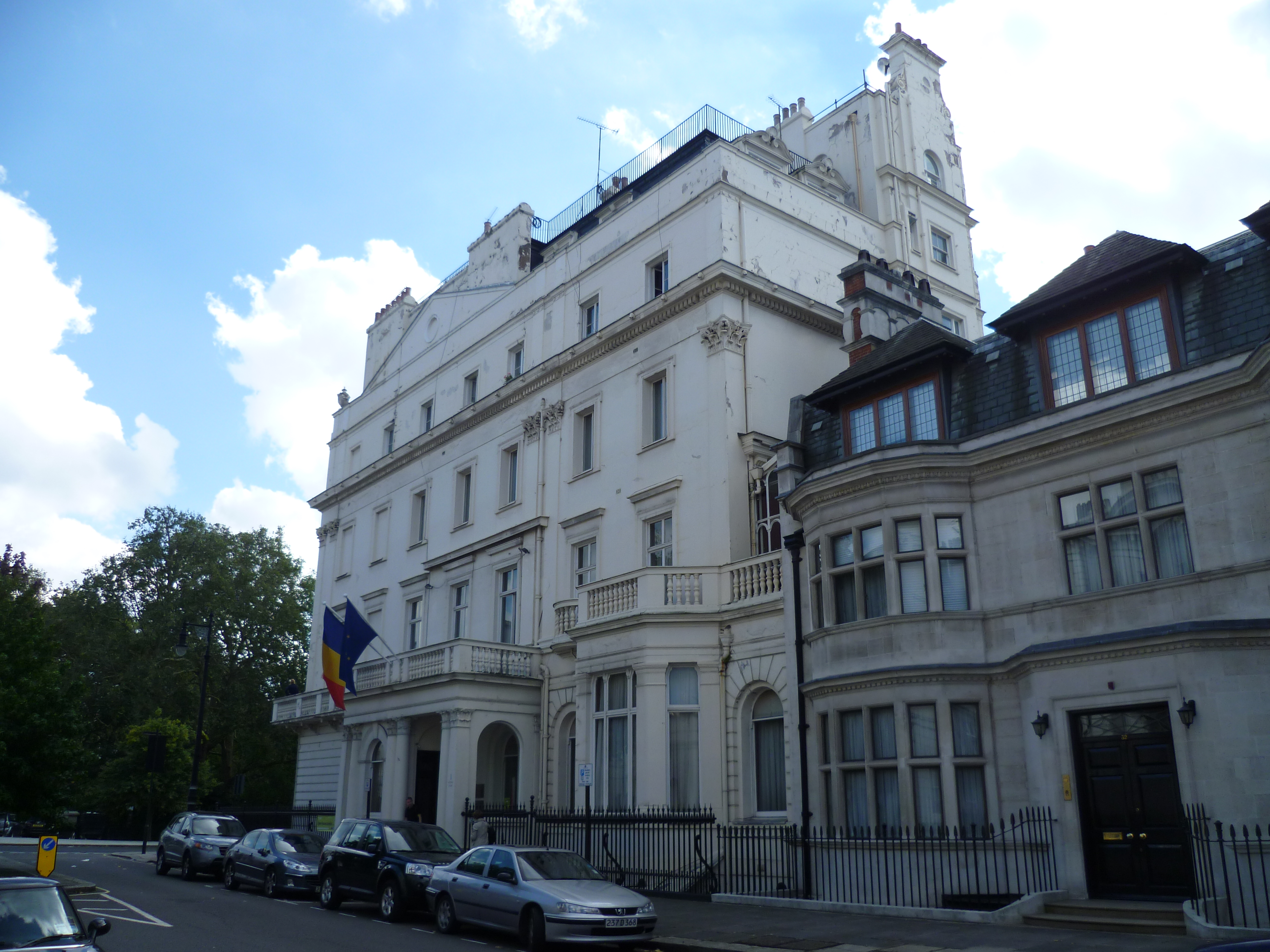
The Romanian Cultural Institute in Belgrave Square, London

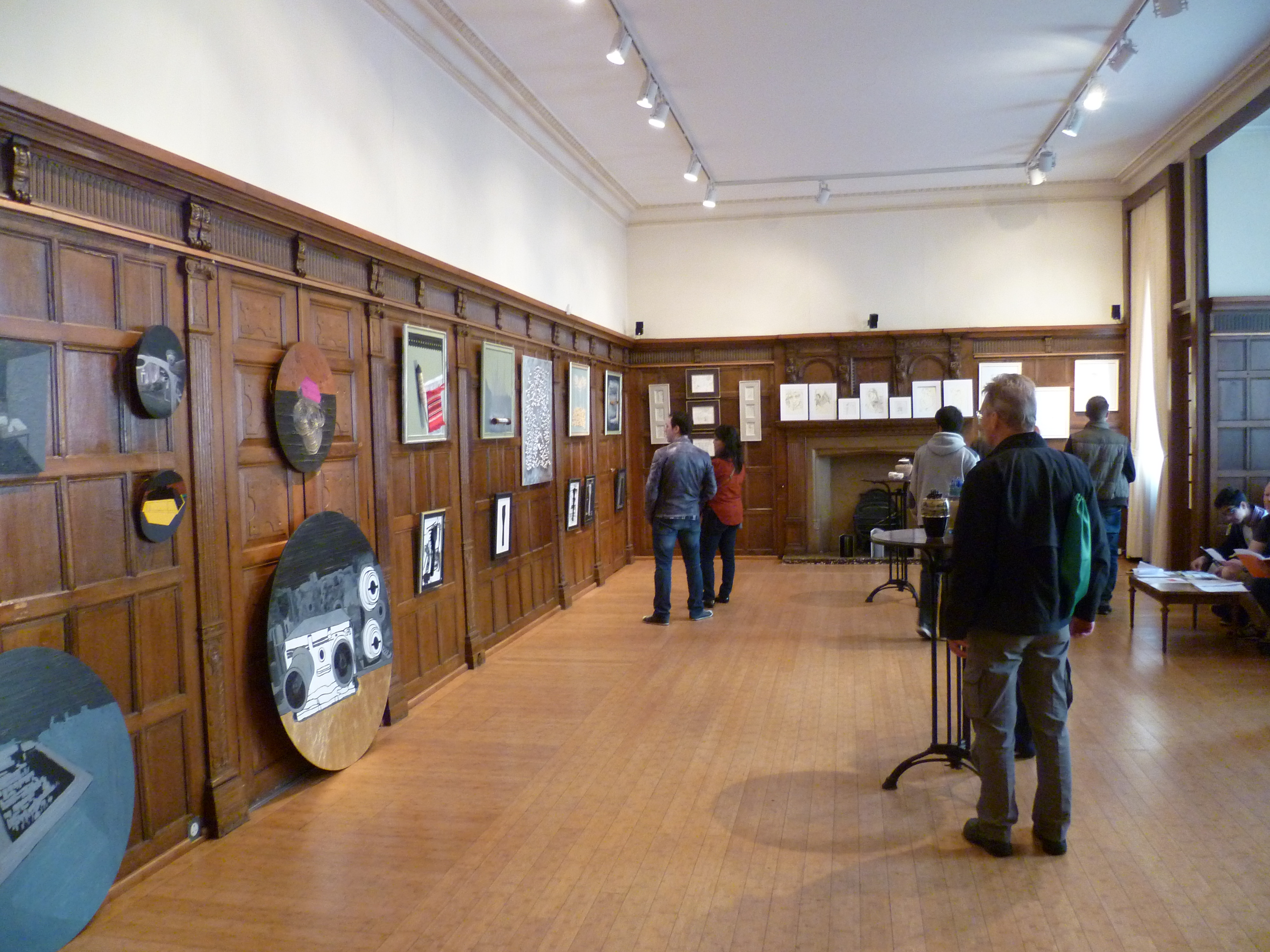
Romanian Cultural Institute, Open House London 2015

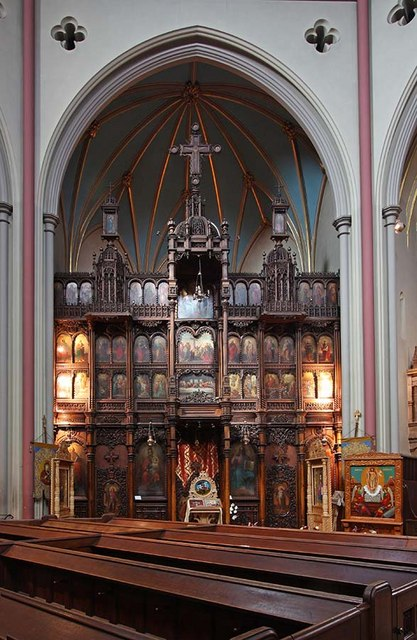
Iconostasis in a chapel in St Dunstan-in-the-West, London, used by the Romanian Orthodox Church in the United Kingdom

== See also ==
- Romania–United Kingdom relations
- Romanian diaspora
- Immigration to the United Kingdom
- Romanian Americans
- Romanian Canadians
