= Romanians in France =

Total population
- 133,000 Romanian-born immigrants as of 2019 (naturalized French citizens with Romanian ancestry are not included in this figure)

Regions with significant populations
- Paris, Île-de-France, Strasbourg, Mulhouse, Île-de-France, Aquitaine, Languedoc-Roussillon, Midi-Pyrénées, Brittany, Poitou-Charentes, Corsica, Centre-Val de Loire, Limousin, Pays de la Loire, Lower Normandy, Provence-Alpes-Côte d'Azur

Languages
- Romanian, French

Religion
- Eastern Orthodoxy, Roman Catholicism, Atheism, Irreligion

Related ethnic groups
- Romanian diaspora

The Romanians in France are French citizens of Romanian heritage who are born in Romania and live as immigrants in France or are born in France from a Romanian immigrant family that came to France in the early 20th century. As of 2019, there were 133,000 Romanian-born citizens living in France, and there is an unknown number of French citizens with Romanian ancestry.

== History ==
Evolution of the number of Romanian nationals living in France (2014-2017)

Romanians had registered a presence on France's soil since the first part of the 19th century. The first Romanians that arrived at that time were mainly rich students who came to study, principally in science and physics domains. Most of them returned to Romania after finishing their studies, although a significant number remained in France. During World War I, some Romanian soldiers were sent to France when the Kingdom of Romania joined the Allies in 1916, to help French troops in the fight against Germany.

An important figure of the Romanian-French population arrived in France in the 1950s, after the end of the war, in a period when both Romania and France were experiencing a very difficult period in their history, and were still recovering from the disasters caused by the conflict. Most of the Romanian population settled in Paris, Lille and other big cities in the north of France.

Another large wave of Romanian emigrants made their way in France in the 1990s, after the fall of Communism in Romania, caused by the Romanian Revolution of 1989. After that important event, millions of Romanians left their homeland in order to come to the West, to the United States, Canada, Germany, Italy, France, United Kingdom, Spain, etc., where up to this day they still form significant communities. More than half of the present-day number of Romanian-French arrived after 1990.

== French language in Romania ==
English and French are the main foreign languages taught in schools. In 2010, the Organisation internationale de la Francophonie identifies 4,756,100 French speakers in the country. According to the 2012 Eurobarometer, English is spoken by 59% of Romanians, French is spoken by 25%.

== Notable people ==
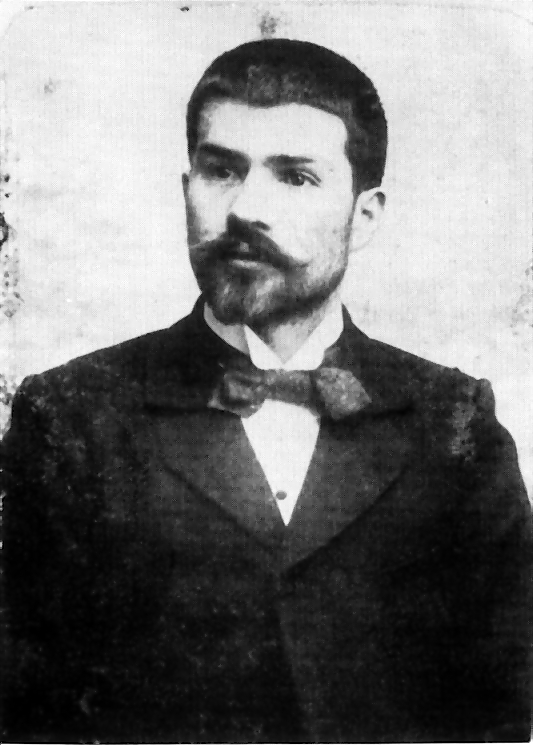
Constantin Brâncuși

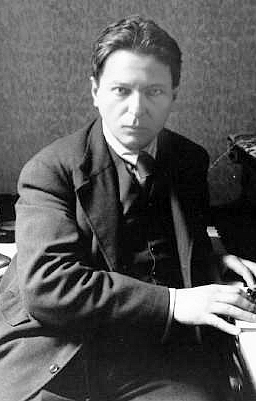
George Enescu

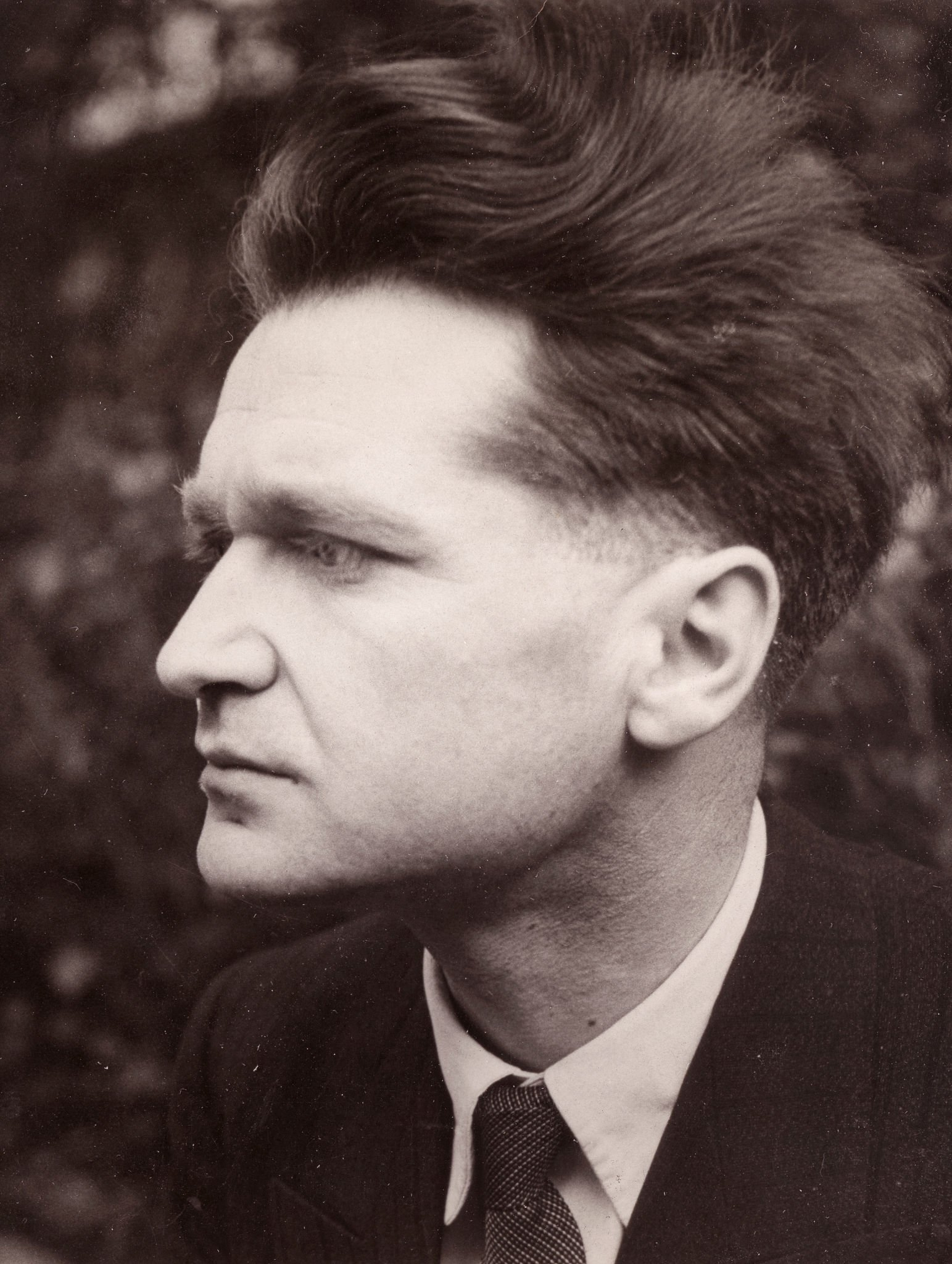
Emil Cioran

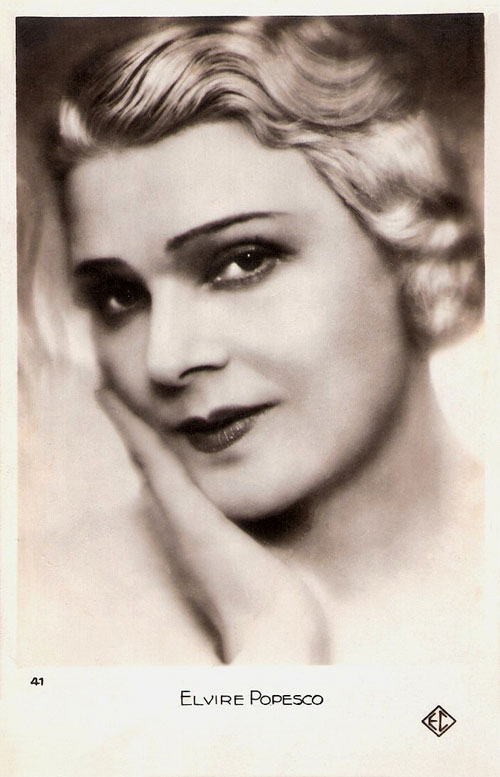
Elvira Popescu

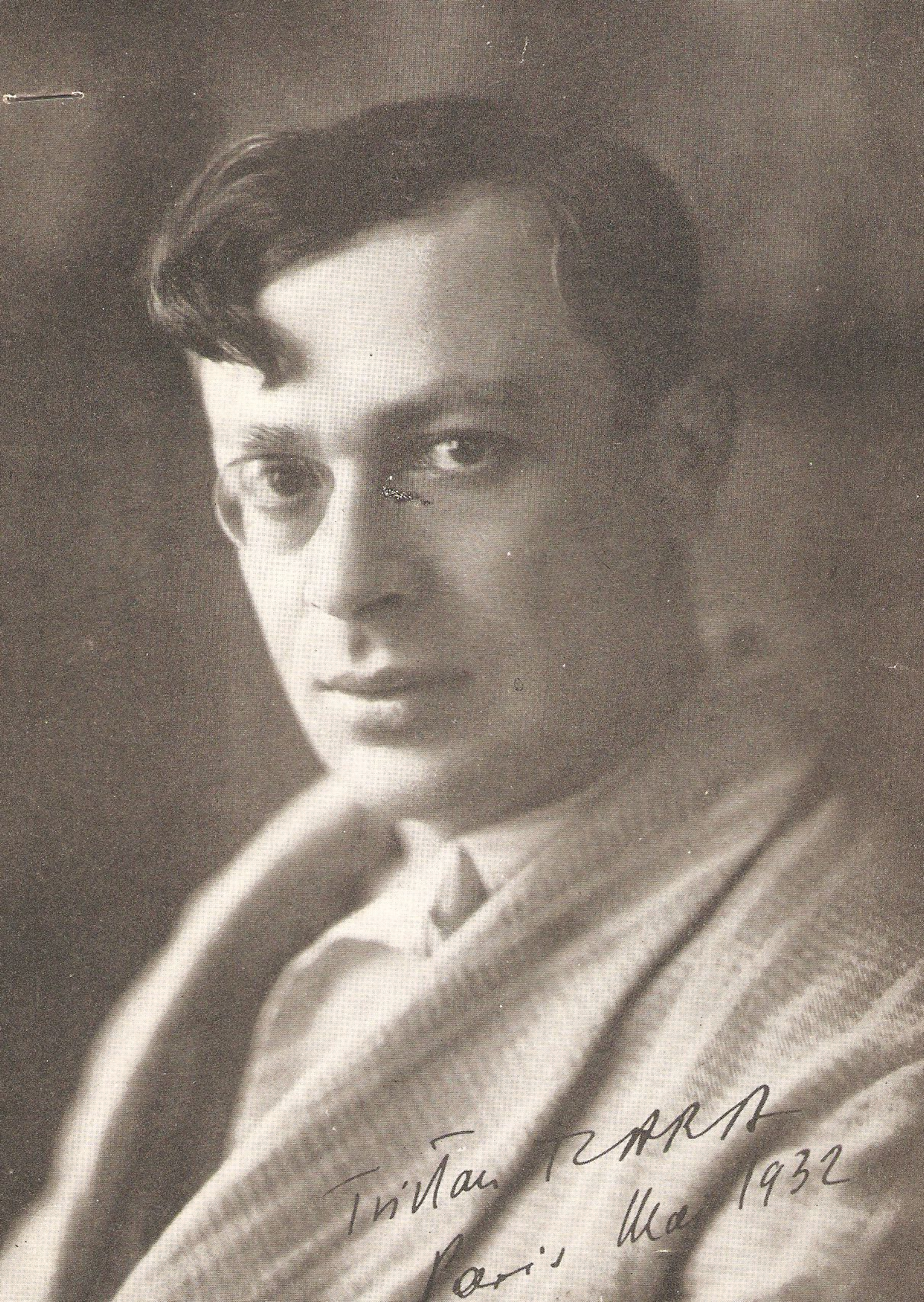
Tristan Tzara

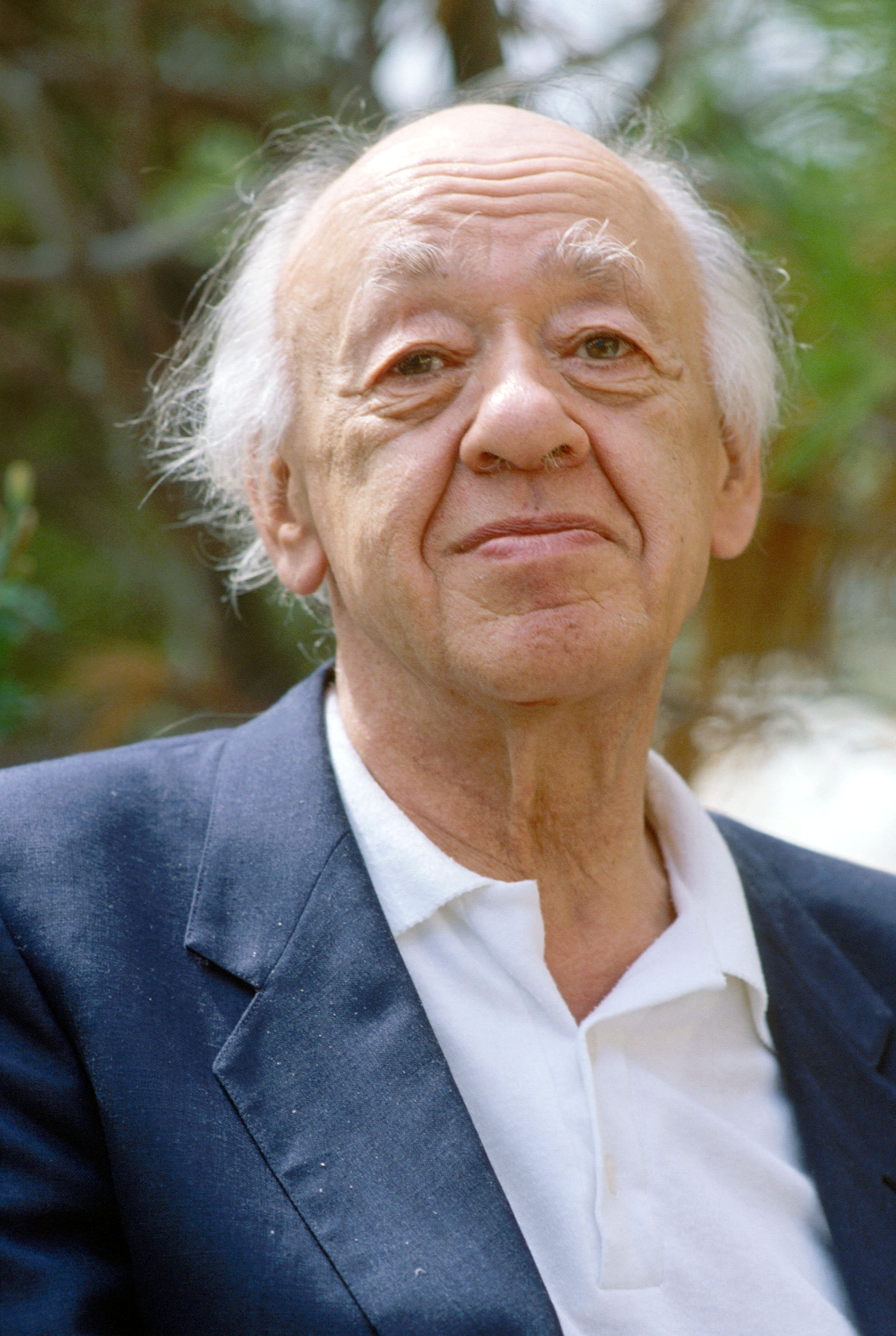
Eugène Ionesco

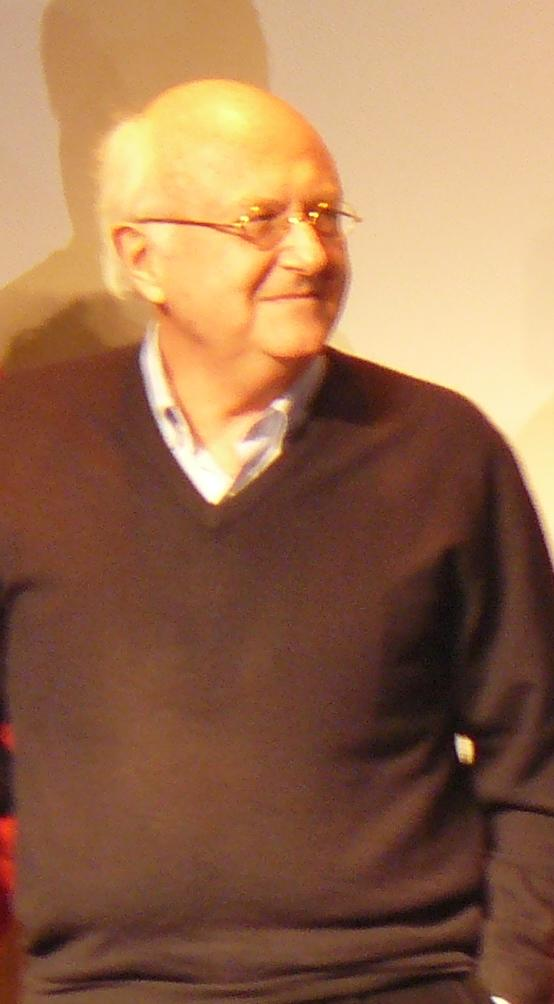
Vladimir Cosma

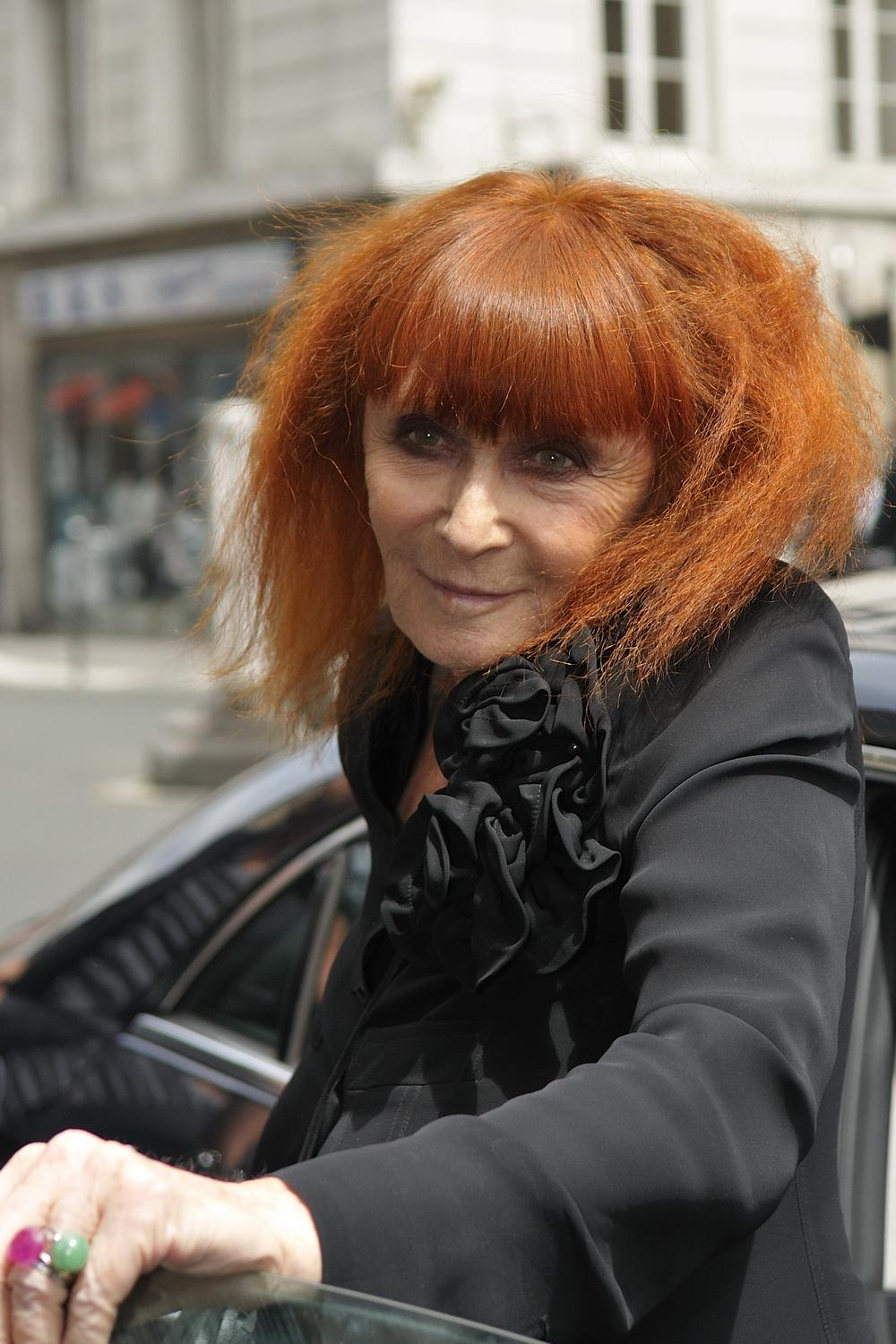
Sonia Rykiel

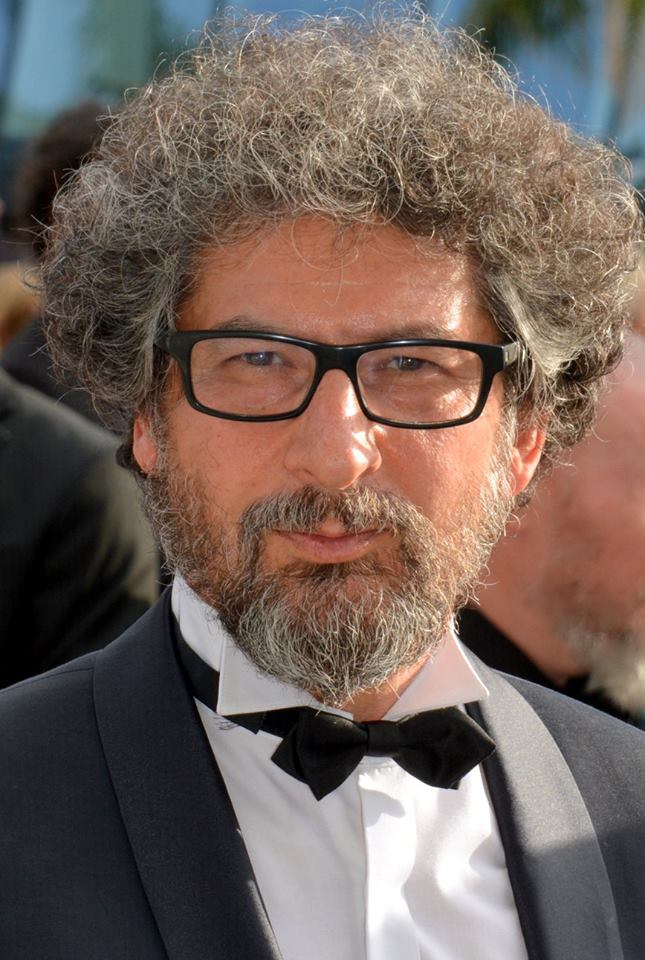
Radu Mihăileanu

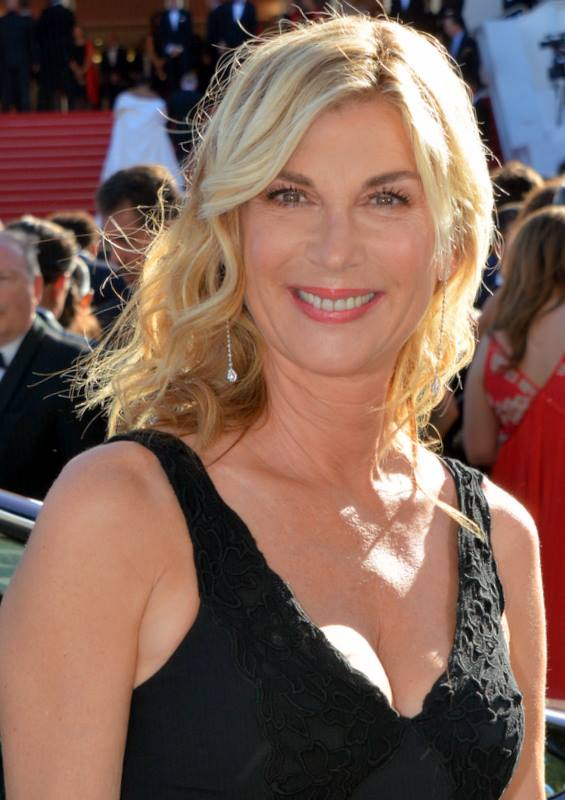
Michèle Laroque

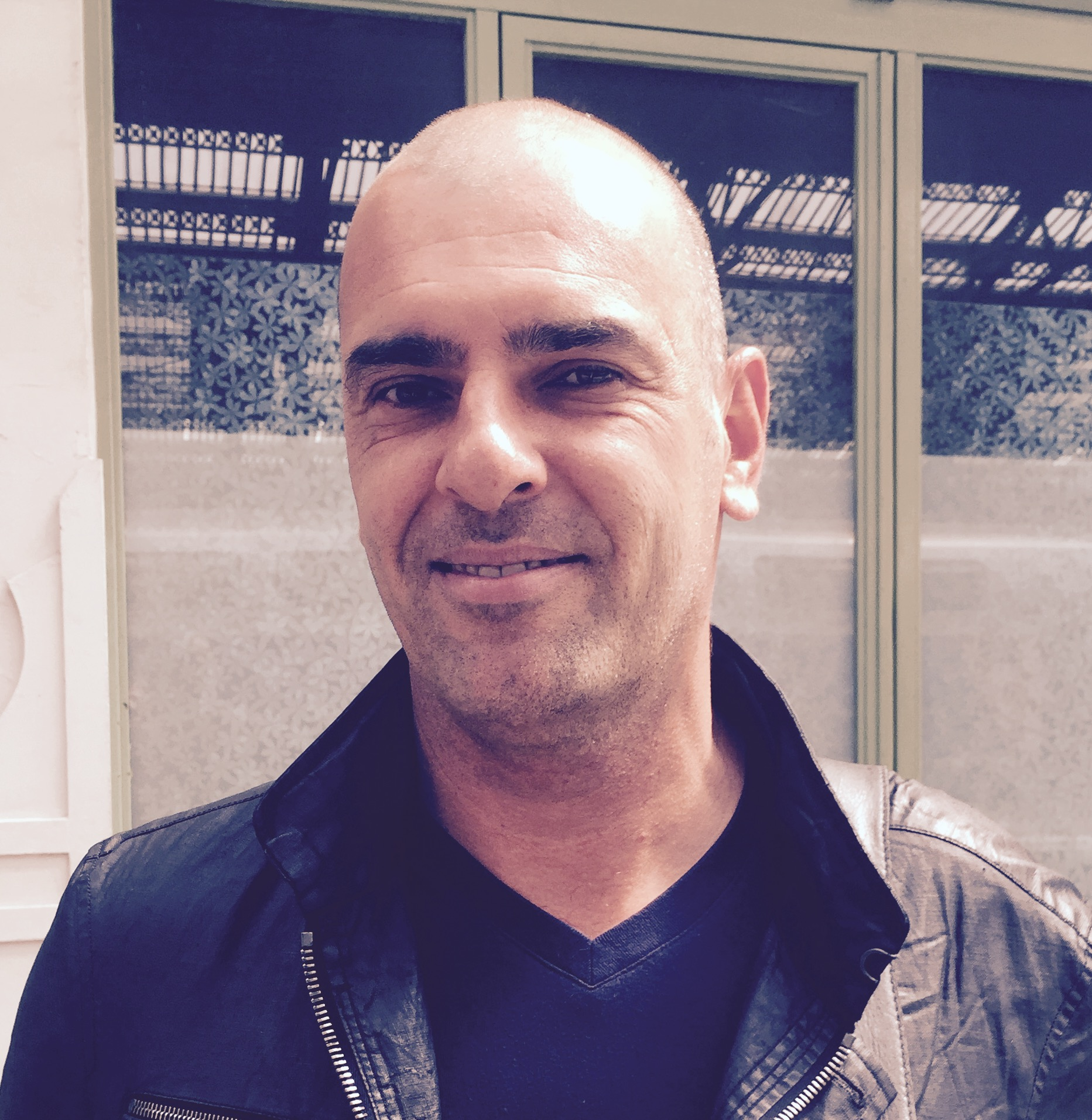
Cédric Pioline

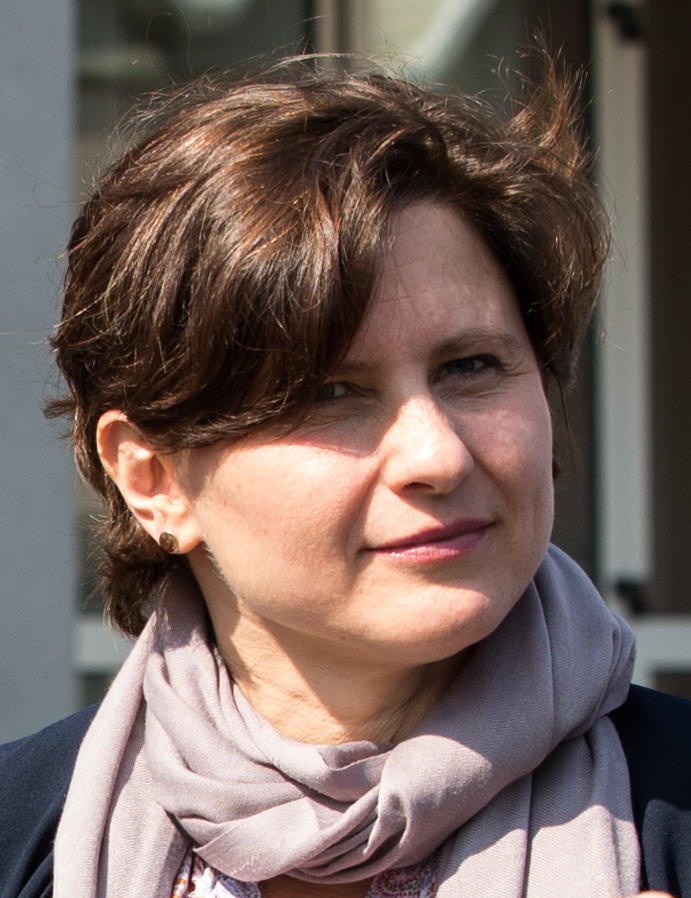
Roxana Mărăcineanu

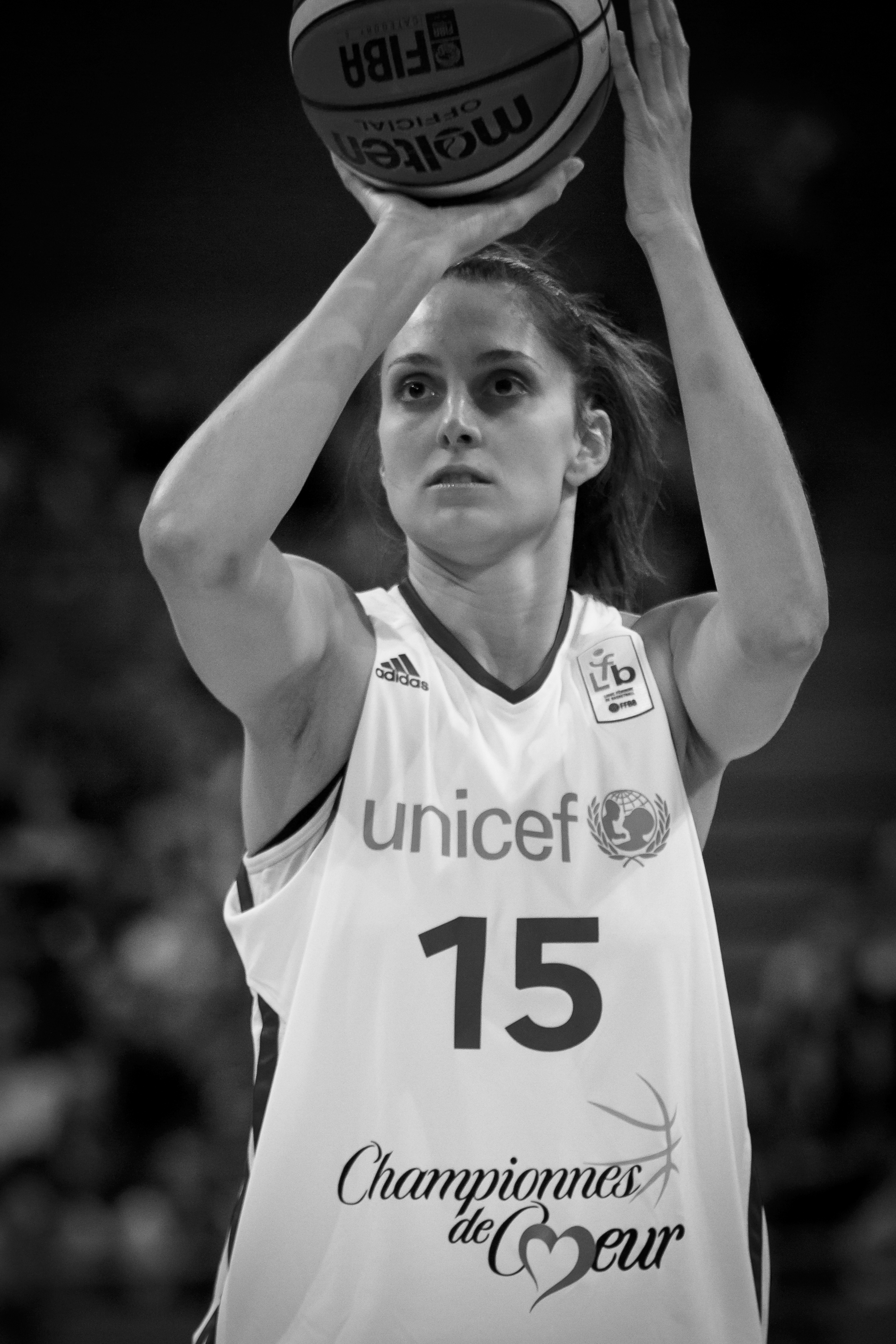
Ana Filip

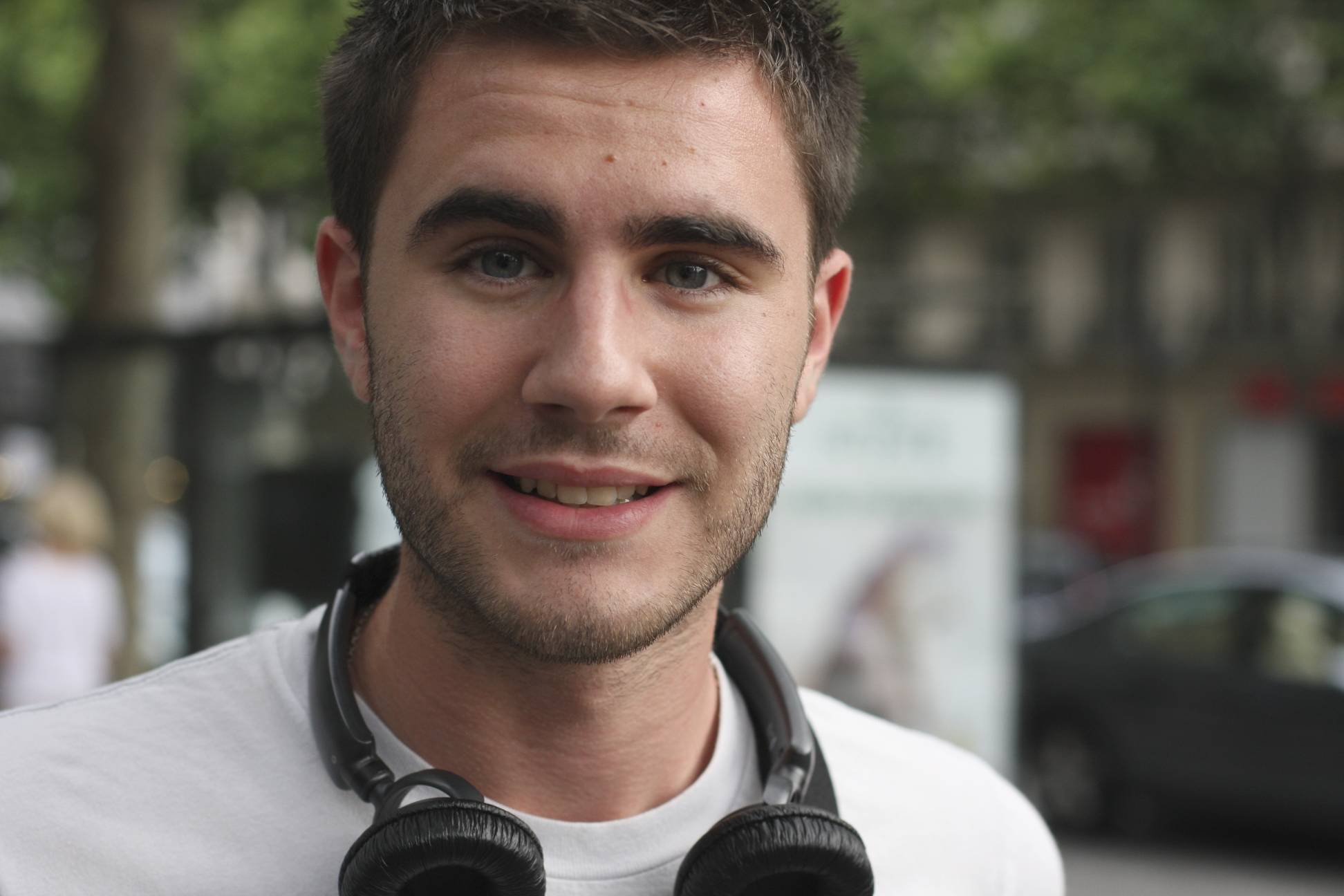
Cyprien Iov

=== Art ===
- Constantin Brâncuși (1876–1957), sculptor and painter
- Margaret Cossaceanu (1893–1980), sculptor
- Philippe Cara Costea (1925–2006), painter and sculptor
- Horia Damian (1922–2012), painter and sculptor
- Natalia Dumitresco (1915–1997), painter
- Tania Mouraud (b. 1942), contemporary artist
- Stefan Ramniceanu (b. 1954), painter and visual artist
- Radu Varia (b. 1940), art historian

=== Film and television ===
- Jean Aurel (1925–1996), film director and screenwriter
- Claude Berri (1934–2009), (film director, producer and screenwriter (Romanian mother)
- Lorànt Deutsch (b. 1975), actor (Romanian mother)
- Julie Dreyfus (b. 1966), actress
- Jany Holt (1909–2005), actress
- Eva Ionesco (b. 1965), actress, film director and screenwriter
- Irina Ionesco (1930-2022), photographer
- Michèle Laroque (b. 1960), actress and screenwriter (Romanian mother)
- Lana Marconi (1917–1990), actress
- Alexandre Mihalesco (1883–1974), actor
- Radu Mihăileanu (b. 1958), film director and screenwriter
- Elvira Popescu (1894–1993), actress
- Josiane Stoléru (b. 1949), actress
- Laurent Terzieff (1935–2010), actor
- Anamaria Vartolomei (b. 1999), actress

=== Literature ===
- Linda Baros (b. 1981), poet
- Marthe Bibesco (1886–1973), poet
- Flavia Bujor (b. 1988), novelist
- Emil Cioran (1911–1995), essayist
- Petru Dumitriu (1924–2002), novelist
- Mircea Eliade (1907-1986), historian of religion, fiction writer, philosopher, and professor at the University of Chicago
- Constantin Gheorghiu (1916–1992), novelist
- Paul Goma (1935–2020), novelist
- Eugène Ionesco (1909–1994), playwright
- Salim Jay (b. 1951), novelist (Romanian mother)
- Anna de Noailles (1876–1933), poet
- Dumitru Țepeneag (b. 1937), novelist
- Tristan Tzara (1896–1963), poet, playwright and founder of the Dada movement
- Elena Văcărescu (1864–1947), poet
- Matei Vișniec (b. 1956), novelist

=== Music ===
- Sergiu Celibidache (1912–1996), conductor and composer
- Marius Constant (1925–2004), composer and conductor
- Vladimir Cosma (b. 1940), composer, conductor and violinist
- Francis Dreyfus (1940–2010), record producer
- George Enescu (1881–1955), composer, violinist, pianist, and conductor
- Mareva Galanter (b. 1979), singer and former Miss France 1999
- Costin Miereanu (1943-2025), composer
- Horațiu Rădulescu (1942–2008), composer
- Lydie Solomon (b. 1982), pianist
- Pierre Vassiliu (1937–2014), singer and songwriter

=== Politics ===
- Lionnel Luca (b. 1954), member of the National Assembly of France
- Roxana Mărăcineanu (b. 1975), current Minister of Youth and Sports of France
- Maurice Paléologue (1859–1944), diplomat
- Lionel Stoléru (1937–2016), politician
- Nicolae Titulescu (1882–1941), politician

=== Sports ===
- Anne-Marie Bănuță (b. 1991), footballer
- Ania Monica Caill (b. 1995), alpine skier
- Alexandra Dascalu (b. 1991), volleyball player
- Ana Filip, (b. 1989), basketball player
- Steve Malonga (b. 1985), rugby union player (Romanian mother)
- Viorel Moldovan (b. 1972), footballer and manager
- Victoria Muntean (b. 1997), tennis player
- Rodica Nagel (b. 1970), long-distance runner
- Cédric Pioline (b. 1969), tennis player (Romanian mother)
- Rudi Prisăcaru (b. 1970), handballer
- Jean-Charles Skarbowsky (b. 1975), kickboxer (Romanian mother)
- Tudor Stroe (b. 1993), rugby union player
- Cynthia Vescan (b. 1992), freestyle wrestler
- Victor Zvunka (b. 1951), footballer and manager

=== Other ===
- Antoine Bibesco (1878–1951), diplomat
- Henri Coandă (1886–1972), inventor and aerodynamics pioneer
- Alain Cribier (1945-2024), cardiologist, world's first performer of the transcatheter aortic valve implantation
- Mattei Dogan (1920–2010), sociologist
- Cyprien Iov (b. 1989), comedian and YouTube personality
- Constantin Levaditi (1874–1953), microbiologist
- Eli Lotar (1905–1969), photographer and cinematographer
- Élie Metchnikoff (1845–1916), zoologist, immunologist, anatomist, recipient of the Nobel Prize in Physiology or Medicine, with Romanian ancestry on his father's side
- Henri Negresco (1870–1920), founder of the Hotel Negresco in Nice
- Gabriel Badea-Päun (b. 1973), art historian
- Valentin Poénaru (b. 1932), mathematician
- Alexandru Proca (1897–1955), physicist
- Élisabeth Roudinesco (b. 1944), historian and psychoanalyst
- Sonia Rykiel (1930–2016), fashion designer
- Nicolas Trifon (1949–2023), academic, editor and linguist
- Horațiu Potra (b. 1970), mercenary

== See also ==
- France–Romania relations
- Romanians in Germany
- Romanians in Italy
- Romanians in the Netherlands
- Romanians in Spain
- Romanians in the United Kingdom
- Romanian Australians
- Romanian Americans
- Romanian Argentines
- Romanian Brazilians
- Romanian Canadians
