= Sexy Lady =

Sexy Lady may refer to:

- "Sexy Lady" (Jessie J song)
- "Sexy Lady" (Yung Berg song)
- "Hey, sexy lady", a lyric from the PSY song Gangnam Style

== See also ==
- "Sexy Ladies"
- Sexy Girl (disambiguation)
