= Cyprien Iov =

French comedian and YouTuber (born 1989)

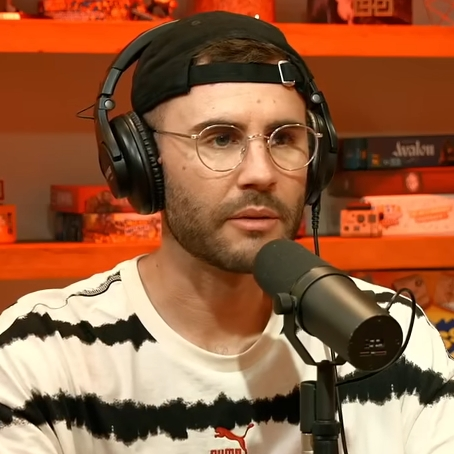
- Cyprien in 2022
- Born: 12 May 1989 (age 37); Nice, France
- Children: 2

YouTube information
- Channel: Cyprien
- Years active: 2007–present
- Genre: Comedy
- Subscribers: 14.6 million
- Views: 3.27 billion
- Last updated: 6 July 2025
- Website: www.cyprien.fr

Cyprien Iov (born 12 May 1989), often known simply as Cyprien (French pronunciation: [sipʁijɛ̃]), is a French comedian, actor, and YouTuber known for his short comic YouTube videos. He became known for his videos on Dailymotion under his pseudonym Monsieur Dream, before continuing to make videos on YouTube under his real name. Cyprien is also known for his short films uploaded onto his YouTube channel.

As of July 2025, his YouTube channel had 14.6 million subscribers and over 3.2 billion views. He was the most-subscribed French YouTuber from 2013 to 2020, and is now the third-most, behind Squeezie and Tibo InShape.

His father died in 2024 and he has two children.

== Early work ==
Cyprien Iov was born on 12 May 1989 in Nice to Romanian parents. In April 2007, Cyprien began posting videos, humoristic podcasts, and tests to his blog on Dailymotion. At that time, he was 18 years old. His videos were also posted on his on his internet blog, monsieurdream.com (which is now cyprien.fr), where he also put his unusual illustrations and videos. He created stickers representing him that he enjoyed sticking everywhere and sending by post to his readers. He then decided to migrate to YouTube.

In April 2007, Cyprien left the South to settle in a small apartment in Paris and he began to animate Le Rewind on the news site 20minutes.fr. Le Rewind is a weekly internet column on unusual news for which Cyprien writes the articles and does the editing.
