= Romanians in Italy =

Total population
- 1,073,196 Romanian citizens (2024) 194,480 Moldovan citizens (2020)

Regions with significant populations
- Rome, Turin, Milan, Bologna, Padua, Verona, Florence, Guidonia Montecelio, Aprilia, Venice

Languages
- Italian, Romanian

Religion
- Predominantly Orthodox Christianity; also Roman Catholicism

Related ethnic groups
- Romanian people, Romanian diaspora, Romanian Britons, Romanian Australians, Romanian Americans, Romanian Canadians, Romanian French people, Romanian Spanish people

Romanians in Italy (Romanian: românii din Italia; Italian: romeni in Italia or rumeni in Italia) became a significant population after 1999, due to a large wave of emigration known in Romania as Fenomenul migrației către UE (the phenomenon of migration toward the European Union). A large part of Romanian emigrants went to Spain or Italy, whose national languages are Romance languages like Romanian. They were followed by another wave beginning in 2002, when Romanian citizens obtained the right to move to any Schengen Zone country without a visa. In 2007 Romania joined the European Union, further increasing the economic and political ties between the countries.

As of 2024, there were 1,073,196 Romanian citizens living in Italy, the largest Romanian immigrant population in any country as well as the largest immigrant group within Italy.

Between 2008 and 2020, 98,499 Romanians acquired Italian citizenship.

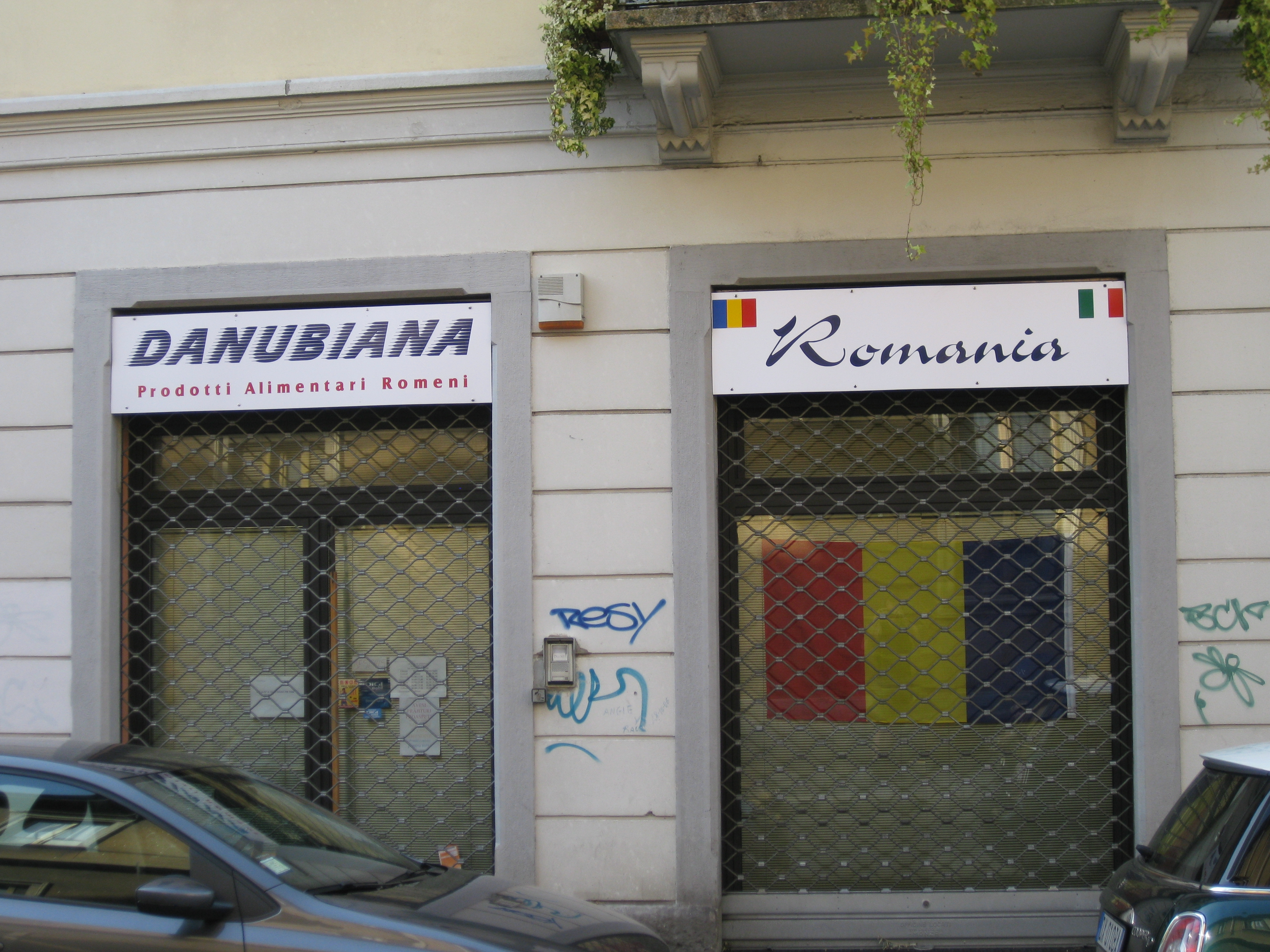
A Romanian market in Monza (2011)

== Demographics ==
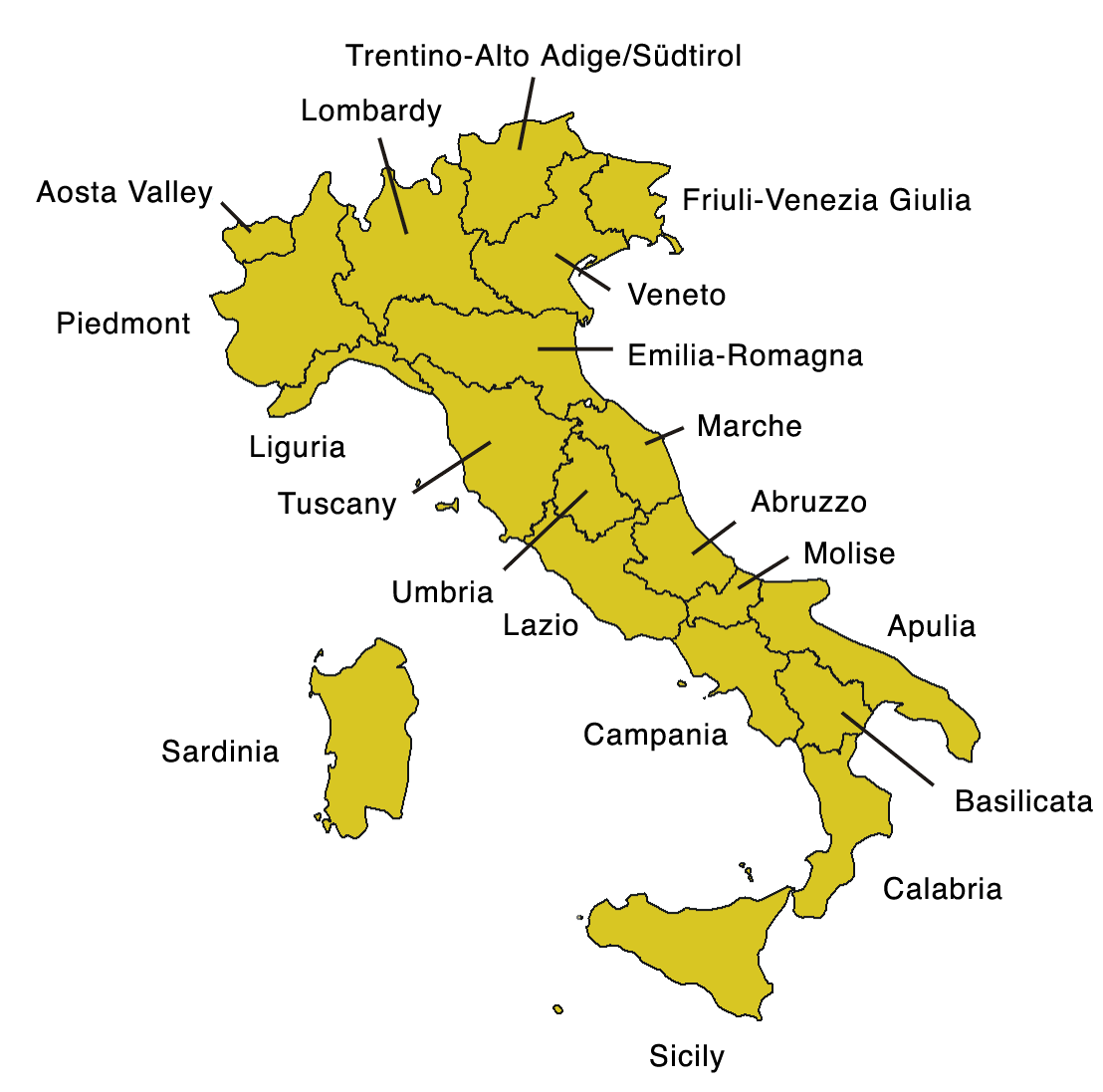
Map showing the regions of Italy.

Romanians in Italy live in the following regions of Italy (as of 2022):

- Lazio 18,1%
- Lombardy 15,8%
- Piedmont 12,3%
- Veneto 11,7%
- Emilia-Romagna 8,8%
- Tuscany 6,8%
- Sicily 4,2%
- Campania 3,1%
- Apulia 2,7%
- Calabria 2,4%
- Friuli-Venezia Giulia 2,4%
- Marche 2,2%
- Umbria 2,1%
- Abruzzo 2,0%
- Liguria 2,0%
- Trentino-Alto Adige 1,3%
- Sardinia 1,0%
- Basilicata 0,7%
- Molise 0,3%
- Valle d'Aosta 0,2%

Rome and Turin are by far the cities hosting the largest communities of Romanians in Italy; in 2016, there were over 90,000 Romanians in Rome, and over 50,000 Romanians in Turin. The next city with a significant population of Romanians is Milan, with over 14,000 Romanians.

About 60% of Romanians in Italy come from the Romanian region of Western Moldavia.

=== Population ===
Romanian citizens resident in Italy, 2001-2024
2001 (Census)	74,885	—
2002	95,039	26.9%
2003	177,812	87.1%
2004	248,849	40.0%
2005	297,570	19.6%
2006	342,200	15.0%
2007	625,278	82.7%
2008	796,477	27.4%
2009	887,763	11.5%
2010	968,576	9.1%
2011 (Census)	823,100	-17.7%
2012	933,354	13.4%
2013	1,081,400	15.9%
2014	1,131,839	4.7%
2015	1,151,395	1.7%
2016	1,168,552	1.5%
2017	1,190,091	1.8%
2018	1,143,859	-3.9%
2019	1,145,718	0.2%
2020	1,076,412	-6.1%
2021	1,083,771	0.7%
2022	1,072,001	-1.1%
2023	1,081,836	0.9%
2024	1,073,196	-0.8%

=== Religion ===
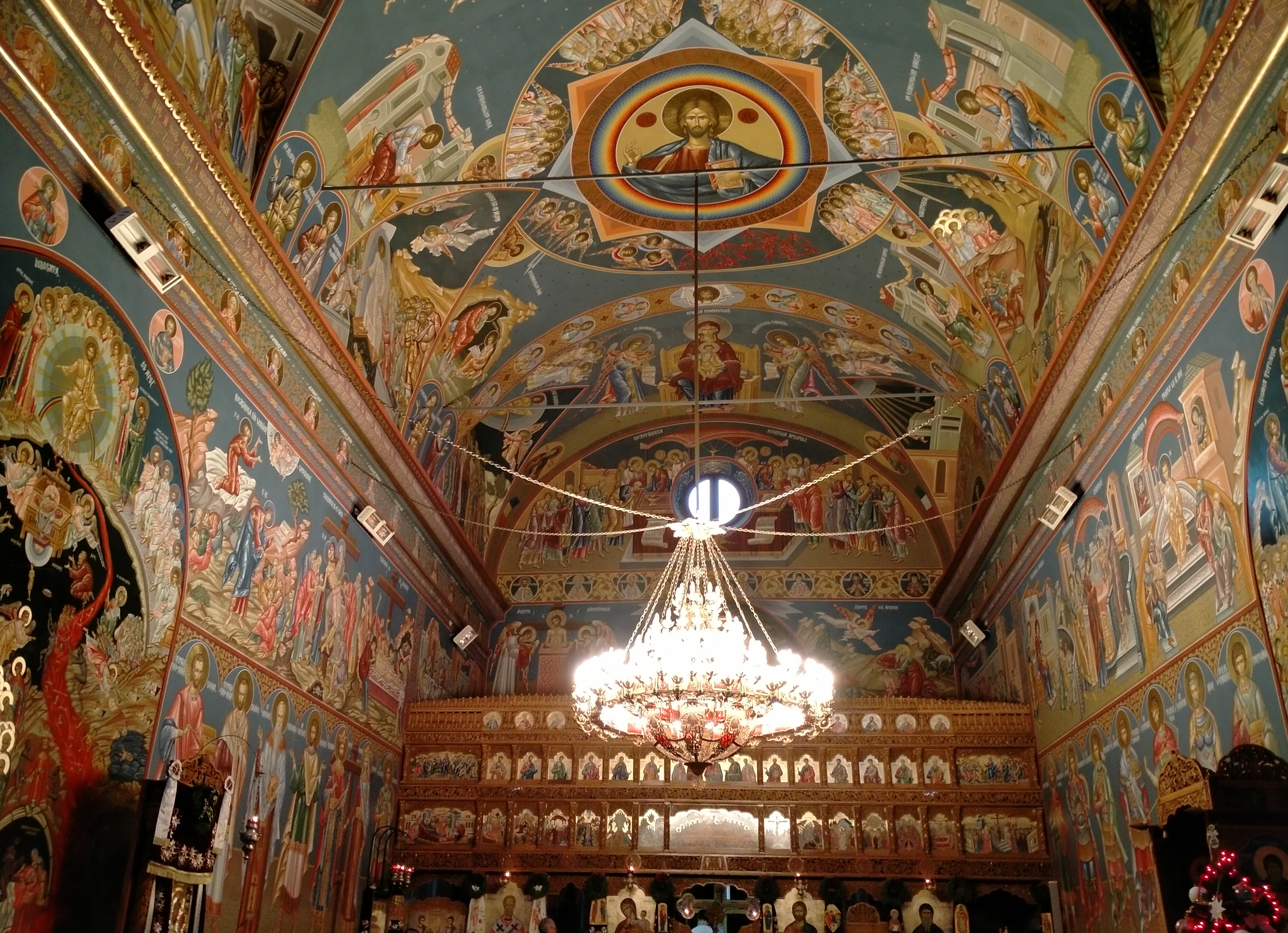
Interior of Romanian Orthodox church in Lucca.

In the years 2011 and 2012 the ISTAT made a survey regarding the religious affiliation among the immigrants in Italy, the religion of the Romanian people in Italy were as follows:

- Orthodox Christians: 79.0%
- Catholics: 13.9%
- Protestants: 2.2%
- Muslims: 0.1%
- Non religious: 2.7%
- Other religions: 2.2%

In 2023, the vice president of the local council of Prato, the Romanian-born Claudiu Stănășel, announced that he started the proceedings for the Romanians to be recognized as an official national minority of Italy.

== Notable people ==
This list includes people of Romanian origin born in Italy or people born in Romania but mainly active in Italy.

- Dinu Adameșteanu (1913–2004), archaeologist
- Alexandra Agiurgiuculese (b. 2001), rhythmic gymnast
- Chris Avram (1931–1989), actor
- Ramona Bădescu (b. 1968), actress and television host
- Cristian Chivu (b. 1980), football player
- Fritz Dennerlein (1936–1992), freestyle swimmer
- Iosif Drăgan (1917–2008), businessman and historian
- Nicolao Dumitru (b. 1991), football player
- Loredana Errore (b. 1984), singer-songwriter
- Mădălina Ghenea (b. 1987), actress and model
- Alessandro Haber (b. 1947), actor, film director and singer
- Claudia Koll (b. 1965), actress and missionary
- Veronica Lazăr (1938–2014), actress
- Marius Mitrea (b. 1982), rugby union referee
- Ana Caterina Morariu (b. 1980), actress
- Gabriele Oriali (b. 1952), football player
- Cristina Pîrv (b. 1972), volleyball player
- Bogdan Rath (b. 1972), water polo player
- Andreea Stefanescu (b. 1993), rhythmic gymnast
- Adrian Stoica, dog trainer
- Cristian Stoica (b. 1976), rugby union footballer
- Linda Valori (b. 1978), singer
- Roman Vlad (1919–2013), composer and pianist
- Virginia Zeani (1925–2023), soprano
- Daniel Boloca (b. 1998), football player

== See also ==
- Italy–Romania relations
- Romanian diaspora
- Immigration to Italy
- Italians in Romania
