= Sexy Girl (Heaven song) =

Single by Heaven featuring Glance
- Released: 29 March 2010
- Studio: Gala Records
- Genre: Dance-pop
- Length: 3:23
- Label: MediaPro Music
- Songwriter(s): Gabriel Huiban; Alex Pelin
- Producer(s): Dan Deaconu; Huiban

Heaven singles chronology
"So Lonely" (2009)	"Sexy Girl" (2010)	"Dynamite" (2011)

Glance singles chronology
"Sexy Girl" (2010)	"Cinema" (2014)

"Sexy Girl" is a song performed by Romanian dance-pop girl group Heaven featuring Romanian-Yemeni rapper Glance. Produced at Gala Records and featuring guest vocals by Glance.

The song was virtually released on March 29 without having its performer's name encrypted. Eventually "Sexy Girl" created a significant buzz on the internet and received favorable reactions from both the public and press. Two weeks later, Heaven admitted that the song belongs to them and started a promotional campaign.

The track has topped the Maltese and Cypriot charts for several weeks in summer 2010 and shortly after the band started touring the Mediterranean region. Furthermore, the song has become their most successful single in Romania, peaking in the top 10 on the national chart.

Considering the success "Sexy Girl" had, Heaven filmed an adjacent music video at the Romanian Academy in late may, 2010. The music video premiered on Libertatea's official website on July 17.

== Credits ==
Credits adapted from Gala Records's website.

- Heaven – lead vocals
- Glance – featured vocals
- Gabriel Huiban – songwriter, producer, backing vocals
- Dan Deaconu – producer, keyboards, drums, bass, mixing, mastering
- Alex Pelin – songwriter
- Mihai Postolache – guitar

== Charts ==
=== Weekly charts ===
Weekly chart performance for "Sexy Girl"
Chart (2010–11)	Peak position
CIS Airplay (TopHit)	11
Romania (Romanian Top 100)	7
Romania (Romanian Radio Airplay)	12
Romania (Romania TV Airplay)	7
Russia Airplay (TopHit)	7

=== Year-end charts ===
2010 year-end chart performance for "Sexy Girl"
Chart (2010)	Position
Romania (Media Forest)	43

2011 year-end chart performance for "Sexy Girl"
Chart (2011)	Position
CIS (TopHit)	61
Russia Airplay (TopHit)	70
