= Romanian Australians =

Demographic group

australienii români (Romanian)

Total population
- Romanian: 15,268 (by birth, 2021); 28,103 (by ancestry, 2021)

Regions with significant populations
- New South Wales, Victoria, Queensland

Languages
- Romanian · Australian English

Religion
- Eastern Orthodox Church, Roman Catholicism, Protestantism and Judaism.

Related ethnic groups
- Romanian Americans, Romanian Canadians, Romanian Britons, Romanian Germans, Romanian French people, Other European peoples

Romanian Australians may include those who have immigrated to Australia from Romania, and Australian-born citizens of Romanian descent. According to ABS (2021 census) figures, there are 15,268 people in Australia who were born in Romania and 28,103 people with Romanian ancestry in Australia.

Romanians were registered in Australia for the first time more than 80 years ago having emigrated for work seeking a more prosperous economic status, or as missionaries. But the first wave of Romanian emigrants to Australia came after World War II, when Romania was experiencing severe economic and political problems. The Romanians who were then emigrating to Australia principally settled in areas around Sydney, Melbourne and Brisbane. The number of Romanians who came to Australia at the time is estimated to be around 2,000 people.

The second wave of Romanian emigration to the Australian continent began after the Romanian Revolution of 1989, when the Communist regime fell and citizens received the right to leave Romania. They came in large numbers for the same reasons as the first-wave immigrants.

A diverse range of ethnic backgrounds can be found among the Romanian-born population in Australia, including Roma (Gypsies), Germans, Hungarians, Serbians, Russians, Greeks, Jews, Turks, and Bulgarians.

== History ==
Vasile Teodorescu, born in Galați in 1853, was one of the early Romanian settlers in Australia. He was the son of an Orthodox priest.

== Demographics ==
As of 2021 the largest communities of Romanian-Australians could be found in Melbourne (5,221), Sydney (3,128)and Brisbane (1,912).

In the 2006 Census, among Romanian-born persons, the religious breakdown was as follows: 80.6% Christianity, 5.8% no religion or atheism, 4.4% Judaism, 3.0% other religions and 5.6% did not answer the question.

== Notable Romanian Australians ==
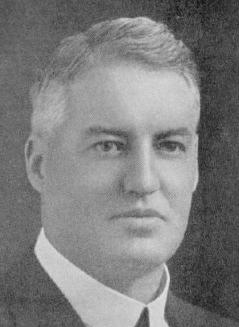
Ted Theodore

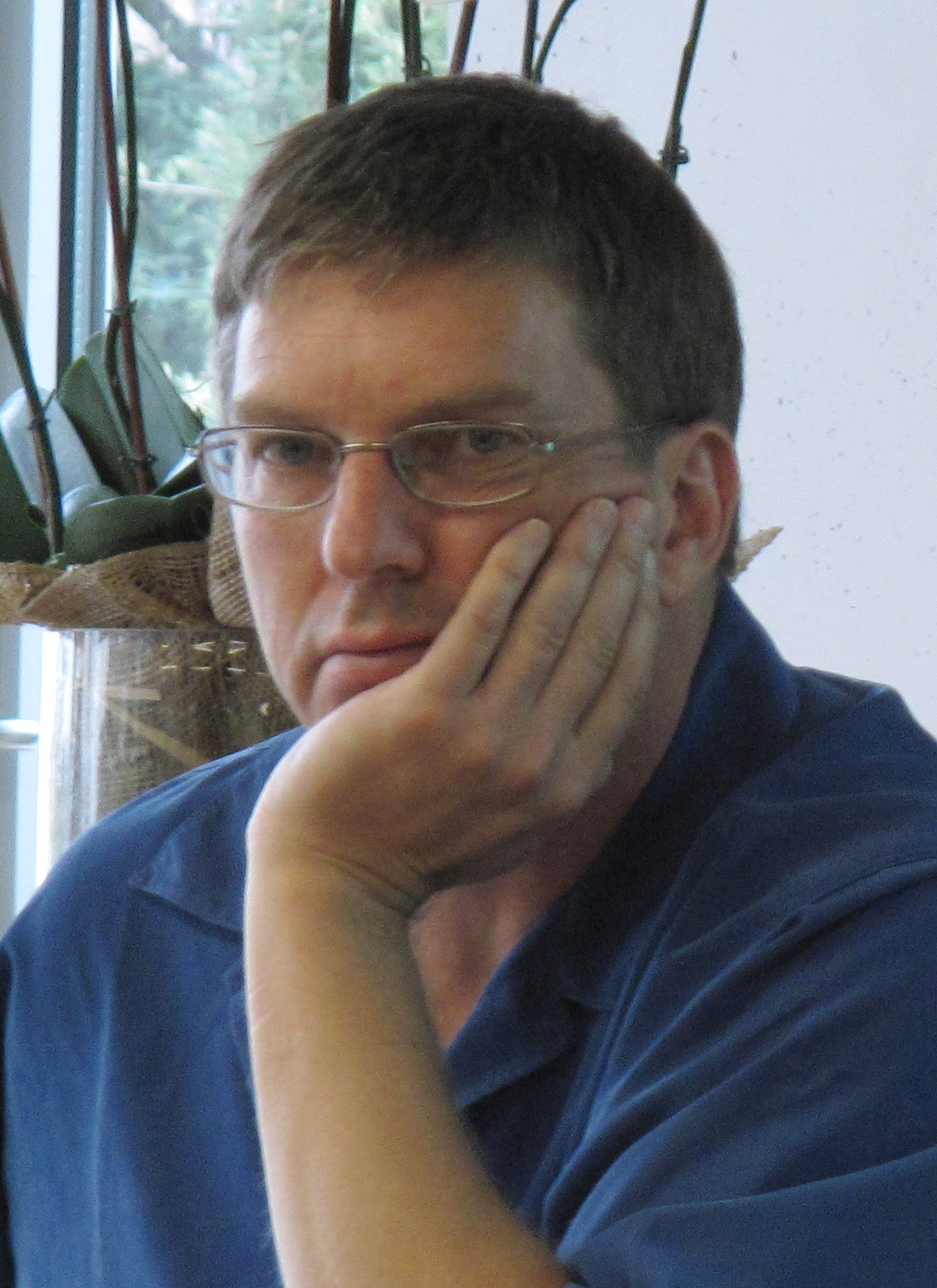
Julian Savulescu

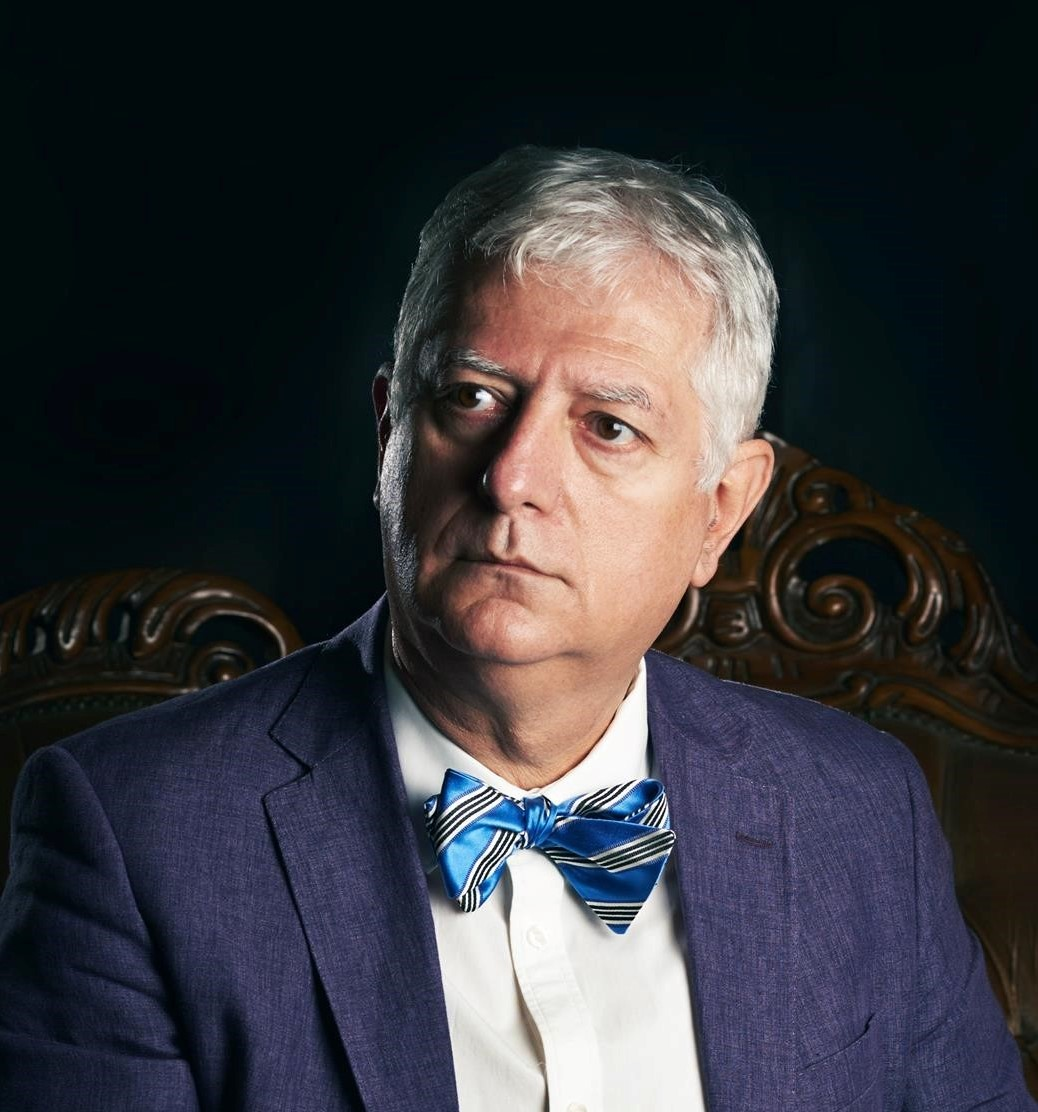
Daniel Ioniță

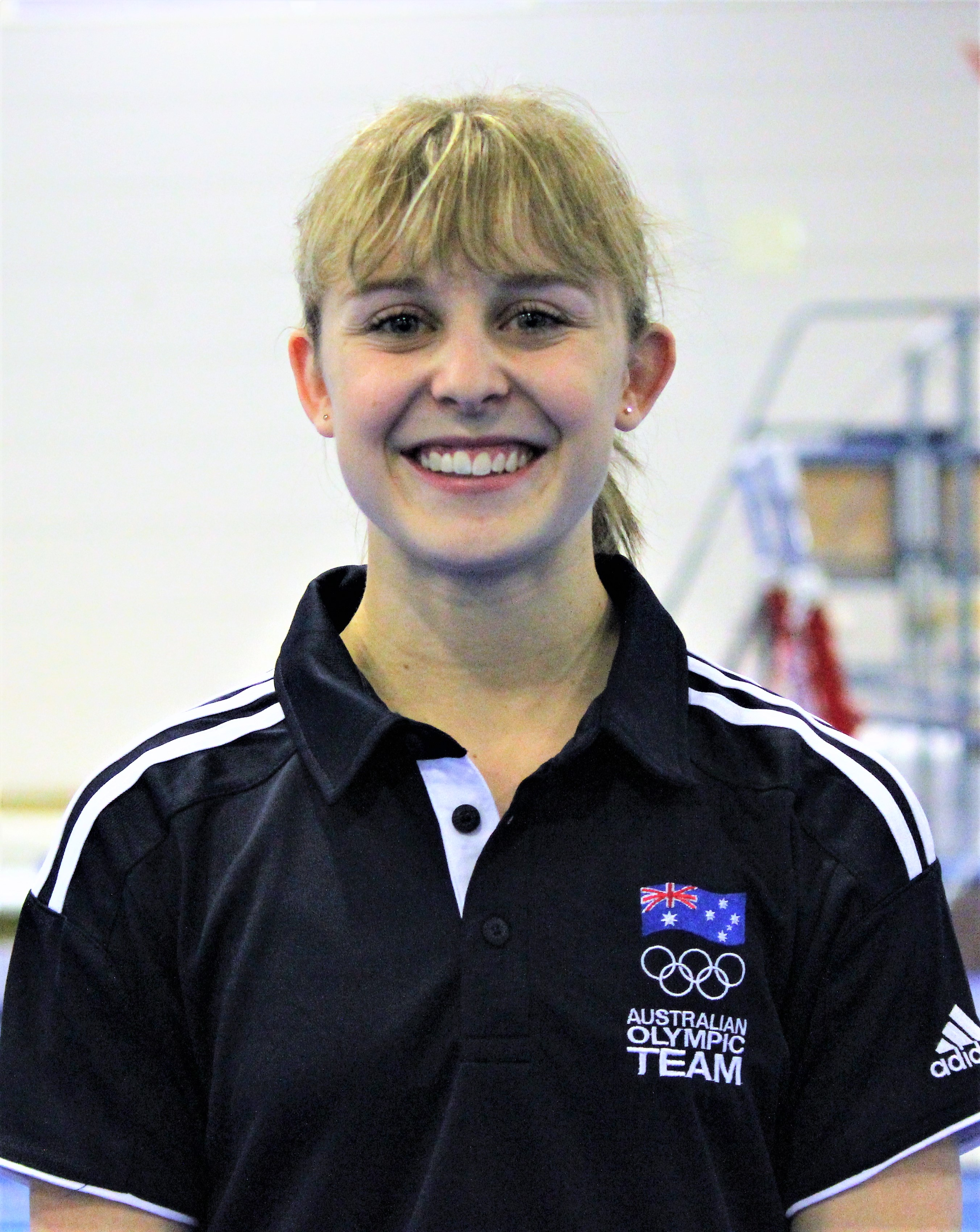
Lauren Mitchell

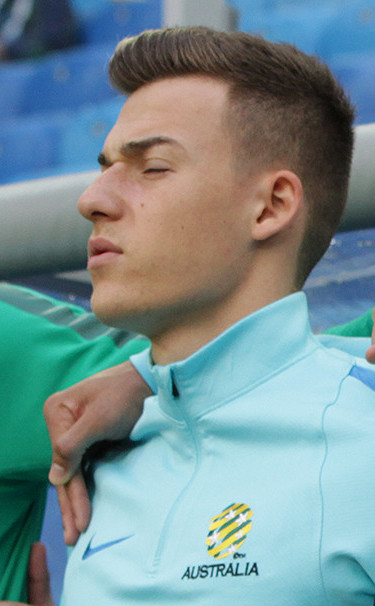
Ajdin Hrustic

- Victor Albert Bailey, physicist (his mother was Romanian)
- Traian Chirilă, chemist
- Carin Clonda, squash player
- Greg Conescu, rugby league footballer
- Daniela Costian, Olympic bronze medalist
- Andrew Ilie, tennis player
- Daniel Ioniță, poet
- Lucy Kiraly, model and television presenter
- Ted Theodore, 12th Treasurer of Australia and Deputy Prime Minister of Australia (1929-1931) (his father was Romanian)
- Anthony Fisher, prelate, Archbishop of Sydney
- Hagi Gligor, footballer
- Raimond Gaita, philosopher and writer (his father was Romanian)
- Daniela Nuțu-Gajić, chess player
- Ajdin Hrustic, footballer
- Lance Picioane, Australian rules footballer
- Ion Popa, rower
- Rosemary Popa, rower
- Julian Savulescu, philosopher and bioethicist
- Lauren Mitchell, artistic gymnast
- Mirka Mora, prominent artist (her mother was Romanian)
- Aida Tomescu, artist
- Edmond Lupancu, footballer
- Lucian Boz, writer

== See also ==
- Demographics of Australia
- European Australians
- Europeans in Oceania
- Immigration to Australia
- Romanian diaspora
- Australia–Romania relations
