= Romanian diaspora =

Ethnically Romanian population outside Romania and Moldova

Countries with significant Romanian population and descendants (as of 2020). Romania + 1,000,000 + 100,000 + 10,000 + 1,000

The Romanian diaspora is the ethnically Romanian population outside Romania and Moldova. The concept does not usually include the ethnic Romanians who live as natives in nearby states, chiefly those Romanians who live in Ukraine, Hungary, Serbia, and Bulgaria. Therefore, the number of all Romanians abroad is estimated at 4–12 million people, depending on one's definition of the term "Romanian" as well as the inclusion respectively exclusion of ethnic Romanians living in nearby countries where they are indigenous. The definition of "who is a Romanian?" may range from rigorous conservative estimates based on self-identification and official statistics to estimates that include people of Romanian ancestry born in their respective countries as well as people born to various ethnic-minorities from Romania. As of 2015/16, over 97% of Romanian emigrants resided in OECD countries; and about 90% of Romanian emigrants in OECD countries lived in Europe, with the most common country of residence being Italy. The vast majority of Romanian emigrants are based in just ten countries, with the most common countries being Italy, Germany, Spain, United Kingdom, United States, Hungary, France and Canada.

Over one million Romanians live in Italy. Large Romanian populations exist in Spain, the UK and Germany, with the latter including many Germans of Romania.

After the Romanian Revolution of 1989, emigration was liberalized and during the 1990s the main destination countries for Romanian emigrants were Germany, Hungary, Israel, the United States and Canada. After further liberalization in 1999, 2002 and especially after Romania entered the European Union in 2007, Italy, Spain, the UK and other EU countries became major destinations.

== Size of the Romanian diaspora ==
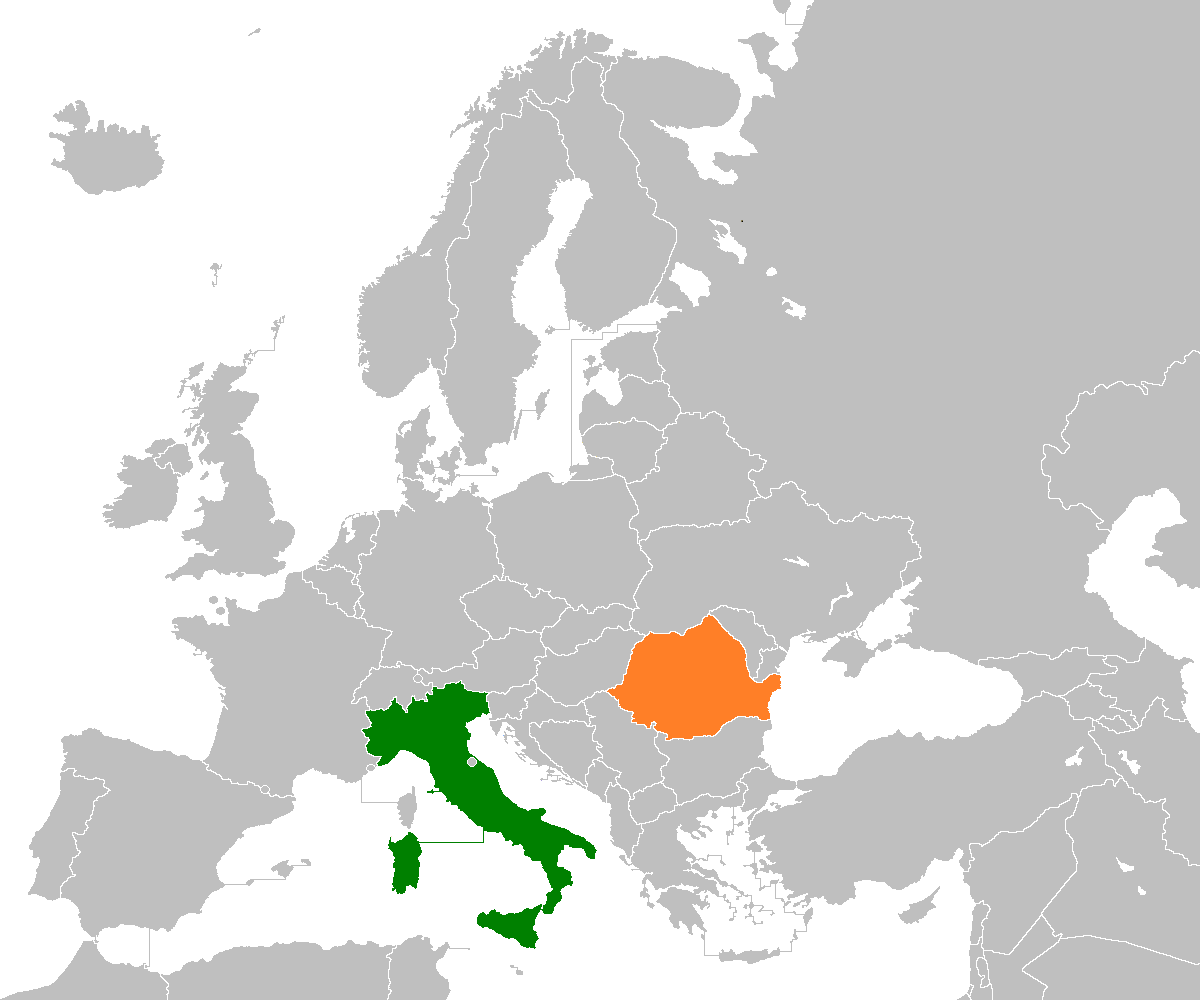
Italy is the most common destination for Romanian emigrants, with over one million Romanians living there.

In 2006, the Romanian diaspora was estimated at 8 million people by then President of Romania, Traian Băsescu, most of them living in the Western Europe (esp. Italy, Spain, Germany, United Kingdom, France, and Austria), North America (Canada and the United States), South America, and Australia. Nonetheless, it is unclear if Băsescu included the indigenous Romanians living in the immediate surroundings of the Romanian state, which are those in Moldova, Bulgaria, Hungary, Serbia and Ukraine.

In December 2013, Cristian David, the government minister for the Department for Romanians Everywhere, declared that a new reality illustrates that between 6–8 million Romanians live outside Romania's borders. This includes 2–3 million indigenous Romanians living in neighbouring states such as Ukraine, Hungary, Serbia, Bulgaria, the Balkans and especially the Republic of Moldova. The number also includes circa 2.7–3.5 million Romanians in Western Europe.

Furthermore, the Romanian diaspora emerged as a powerful political force in elections since 2009. For the 2014 presidential election, voting in the diaspora was poorly organized and resulted in protests in several major European cities. The diaspora vote played a key role in the final result. 5 years later, in the 2019 presidential election, then center-right candidate and incumbent President Klaus Iohannis was once again overwhelmingly voted for by Romanian diaspora from all over the world.

Below is a list of self-declared ethnic Romanians in the countries where they live, excluding those who live in Romania and Moldova but including those who live in Ukraine, Serbia, Hungary, and Bulgaria.

The numbers are based on official statistical data in the respective states where such Romanians reside or – wherever such data is unavailable – based on official estimates made by the Romanian department for Romanians abroad (figures for Spain, Italy, Germany, the United Kingdom, France, Sweden, Portugal, and Turkey are for Romanian citizens, and may include individuals of any ethnicity).

Ethnic Romanians are primarily present in Europe and North America. However, there are ethnic Romanian enclaves in Turkey, both in the Asian and European parts of the country, who are descendants of Wallachian settlers invited by the Ottoman Empire from the early fourteenth to the late nineteenth centuries. Furthermore, there are about 2,000 Romanian immigrants in Japan since the late twentieth century.

== Distribution by country ==
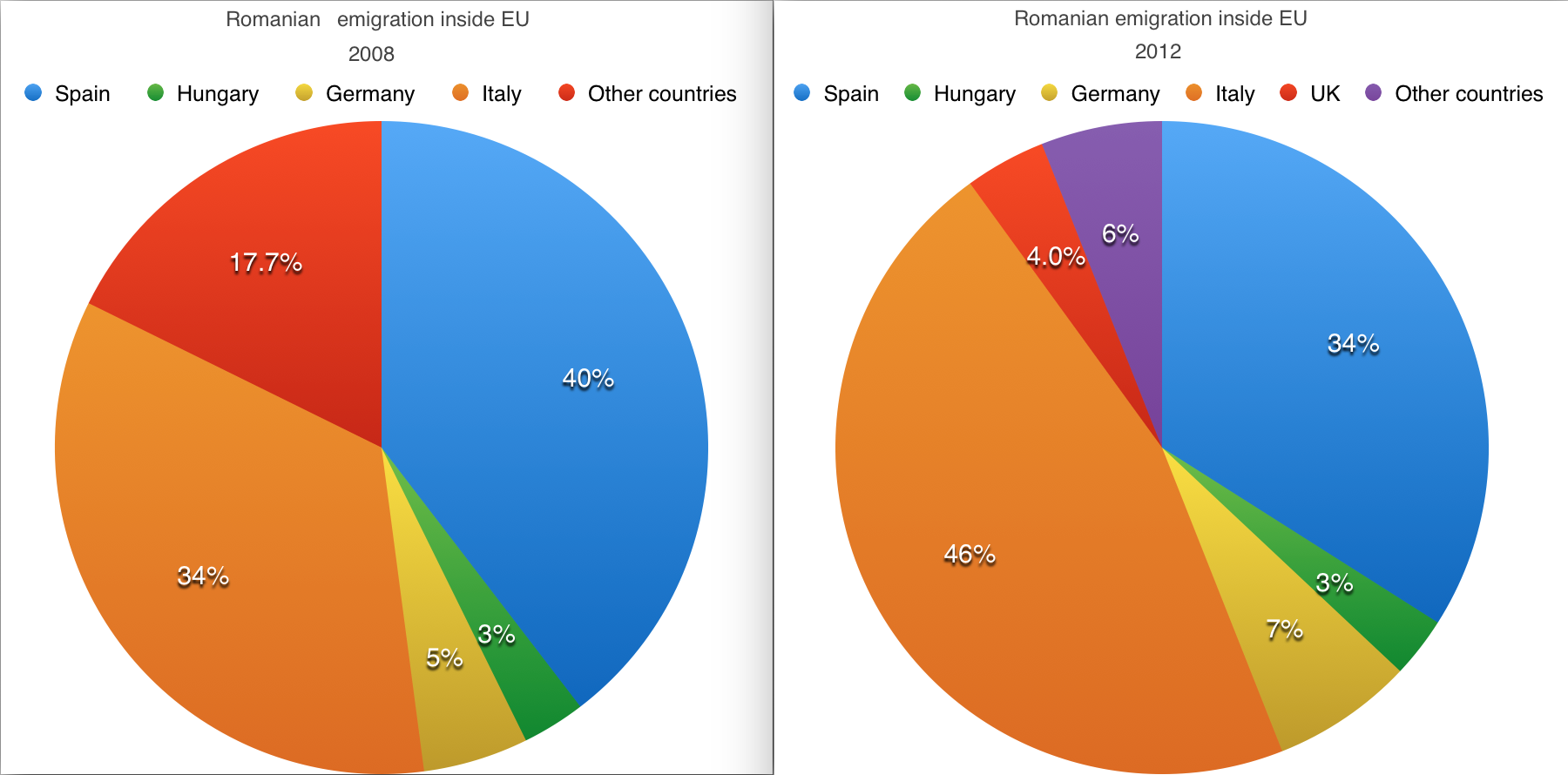
Romanian diaspora inside the EU between 2008 and 2012

Country	Year	Population	Origin, notes
Italy	2023	1,053,042	Citizens (additional 102.667 Moldovans)
Germany	2023	909,795 Romanian citizens (as of 2023). 1,146,000 people with Romanian ancestry (as of 2023). The figures include Romanian-Germans.	Citizens According to German statistics, in 2023, the number of Romanian citizens in Germany was 909,795. The number of people with Romanian ancestry in 2023 (defined as all persons who migrated to the present area of the Federal Republic of Germany after 1949, plus all foreign nationals born in Germany and all persons born in Germany as German nationals with at least one parent who migrated to Germany or was born in Germany as a foreign national) was 1,146,000. (the overall number of people with Romanian ancestry in Germany includes many Romanian-Germans as well) (additional 37.542 Moldovans)
Spain	2022/2023	620,463 (Romanian citizens, as of January 2024) 539,418 (residents of Spain who were born in Romania as of 2022)	Immigrants and Romanian citizens of all ethnic groups. The first number includes all Romanians in Spain, thus taking into account second and third generation Romanians or nationalized ones that count as Spanish in the census. The second number takes into account just Romanian citizens. The third number represents Romanian born residents in Spain. (additional 17,868 Moldovans)
United Kingdom	2021	538,840 citizens in England and Wales were born in Romania in 2021; additional Romanians in Scotland (12.102 as of 2022) and Northern Ireland (9.000 as of 2021); there are also naturalized second and third generation Romanians in the UK	Immigrants (additional 12,000 Moldovans)
United States	2023	According to the 2023 American Community Survey, 425,738 Americans indicated Romanian as their first or second ancestry, however other sources provide higher estimates, for example, the Romanian-American Network supplies a rough estimate of 1.2 million who are fully or partially of Romanian ethnicity. There is also a significant number of people of Romanian Jewish ancestry, estimated at 225,000. According to the 2023 American Community Survey, there are 160,205 people born in Romania.	Immigrants
Canada	2021	215,885 (ancestry) 86,770 (born in Romania).	According to the 2021 Census, there were 215,885 Canadian residents declaring themselves of Romanian origin; Romanian language was the mother tongue of 93,160 of Canadian residents. There were 86,770 Canadian residents who were born in Romania.
Austria	2025	155,700	Citizens (additional 6.800 Moldovans)
Ukraine	2001	150,989	Indigenous to Zakarpattia Oblast, Odesa Oblast, and Chernivtsi Oblast (additional 258,619 Moldovans)
France	2019	133,000	Immigrants
Belgium	2020	105,358	Immigrants
Israel	2020	86,200	Immigrants (mostly Romanian Jews)
Netherlands	2022	48,563	Immigrants (additional 986 Moldovans)
Greece	2020	44,600	Immigrants (additional 10,391 Moldovans). There are also 209,000 Aromanians and 3,000 Megleno-Romanians in Greece; however, they are not considered an ethnic but a linguistic/cultural minority.
Denmark	2022	43,312	Immigrants (additional 2,236 Moldovans)
Ireland	2022	42,460	Immigrants
Sweden	2023	36,738	Immigrants (additional 1,573 Moldovans)
Hungary	2011	30,924	Indigenous and immigrants
Switzerland	2022	27,299	Immigrants
Cyprus	2011	24,376	Immigrants
Portugal	2023	23,393	There are 23,393 Romanian citizens in Portugal as of 2023. According to Eurostat as many as 7,000 Romanians have acquired Portuguese citizenship since 2008, thus are excluded from the number of Romanian nationals in Portugal. (additional 5,243 Moldovan foreigners as of 2022; since 2008 more than 20,000 Moldovans became Portuguese citizens)
Serbia	2022	23,044	Indigenous to Vojvodina and the Timok Valley (additional 21,013 Vlachs and 327 Aromanians)
Norway	2022	18,877	Immigrants and Norwegian-born to immigrant parents
Australia	2021	15,268 (by birth) 28,103 (by ancestry)	According to ABS (2021 census) figures, there are 15,268 people in Australia who were born in Romania and 28,103 people with Romanian ancestry in Australia.
Czechia	2018	14,684	Immigrants (additionally 5,811 Moldovans)
Kazakhstan	2009	14,666	Displaced and deported during World War II (including Moldovans)
Turkey		14,000	Immigrants
Japan		10,000	Immigrants
Slovakia	2017	8,474	Immigrants
Brazil		7,393	Immigrants and Brazilians with Romanian ancestry
United Arab Emirates		6,444	Immigrants
Finland	2021	5,628	Immigrants (additional 778 Moldovans)
Luxembourg	2019	5,209	Immigrants
Jordan		4,000	Immigrants
Russia	2010	3,201	Immigrants/displaced during World War II (additional 586,122 Moldovans)
South Africa		3,000	Immigrants
Iceland	2022	2,505	Immigrants
Qatar		2,000	Immigrants
New Zealand	2018	1,485	Immigrants
China		1,320	Immigrants
Malta	2016	1,262	Immigrants
Uruguay		1,000	Immigrants
Chile		1,000	Immigrants
Bulgaria	2011	891	Indigenous to Vidin Province and parts of northern Bulgaria (additional 3,684 "Vlachs")
Palestine		850	Immigrants
Kuwait		696	Immigrants
South Korea		634	Immigrants
Mexico		600	Immigrants
Ethiopia		485	Immigrants
India		400	Immigrants
Singapore		400	Immigrants
Paraguay		398	Immigrants
Argentina	2021	392 Romanian citizens living in Argentina. Additional people in Argentina with Romanian ancestry, including Romanian Jews and Romanian Roma.	Citizens and decedents
Oman		382	Immigrants
Colombia		350	Immigrants
San Marino	2018	283	Immigrants
Monaco		250	Immigrants
Philippines	2019	209	Immigrants
Uruguay		200	Immigrants
Peru		174	Immigrants
Indonesia		155	Immigrants
Venezuela	2020	150	Immigrants
Thailand		106	Immigrants
Cuba		100	Immigrants
North Macedonia		100	Immigrants (additional 9,900 Aromanians and 2,100 Megleno-Romanians)
Vietnam		100	Immigrants
Lithuania	2011	77	Immigrants
Pakistan		75	Immigrants
Latvia	2011	63	Immigrants (additional 1,919 Moldovans)
Dominican Republic		30	Immigrants
Liechtenstein		15	Immigrants
Albania			There live up to 300,000 indigenous Aromanians, but Albanian authorities do not recognize them as Romanian minority.
Total		4,321,496	The estimate is the sum of the countrywide estimates listed. To this are added 1,618,650 people belonging to ethnic groups Romanian authorities claim to be part of the Romanian population (e.g., Moldovans, Aromanians, Megleno-Romanians, Istro-Romanians). The total estimate is roughly 5.9 million.

== Politics ==
=== 2025 Romanian presidential election ===
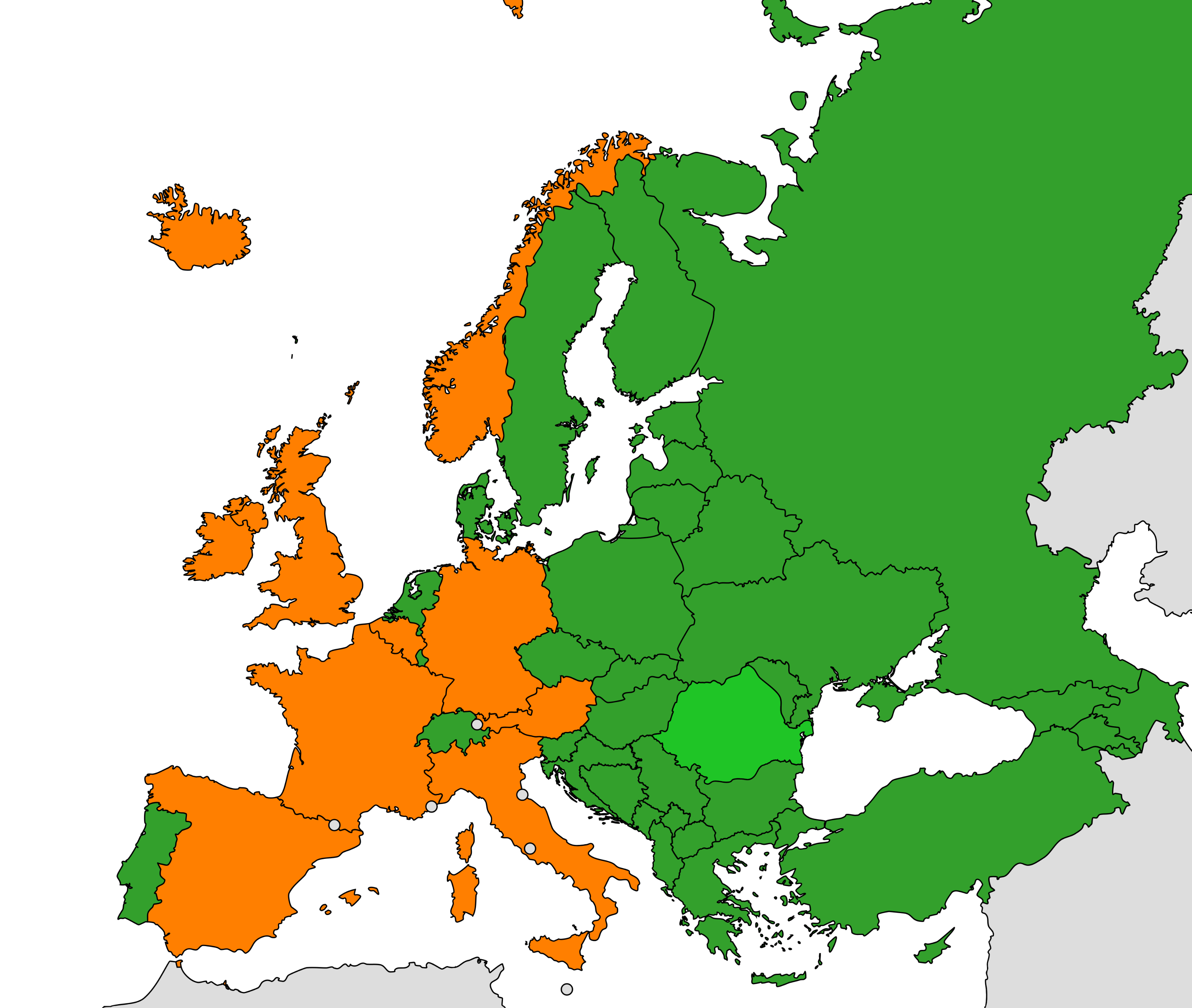
First place diaspora votes in Europe by country: Nicușor Dan George Simion

Results by county
County	George Simion		Nicușor Dan		Crin Antonescu		Victor Ponta		Elena Lasconi		Lavinia Șandru		Daniel Funeriu		Cristian Terheș		Sebastian Popescu		John Ion Banu		Silviu Predoiu	
County	Votes	%	Votes	%	Votes	%	Votes	%	Votes	%	Votes	%	Votes	%	Votes	%	Votes	%	Votes	%	Votes	%
Diaspora	587,190	60.79%	247,388	25.61%	65,270	6.76%	23,188	2.40%	31,508	3.26%	2,347	0.24%	3,241	0.34%	2,956	0.31%	1,159	0.12%	1,009	0.10%	750	0.08%
Total	3,862,761	40.96%	1,979,767	20.99%	1,892,930	20.07%	1,230,164	13.04%	252,721	2.68%	60,682	0.64%	49,604	0.53%	36,445	0.39%	25,994	0.28%	22,020	0.23%	17,186	0.18%
Source: Permanent Electoral Authority

Results by county
County	Nicușor Dan		George Simion	
County	Votes	%	Votes	%
Diaspora	720,996	44.14%	912,553	55.86%
Total	6,168,642	53.60%	5,339,053	46.40%
Source: Permanent Electoral Authority

=== 2024 Romanian presidential election ===
First round results by county
County	Georgescu		Lasconi		Ciolacu		Simion		Ciucă		Geoană		Kelemen	
County	Votes	%	Votes	%	Votes	%	Votes	%	Votes	%	Votes	%	Votes	%
Diaspora	345,925	43.35%	214,033	26.82%	22,893	2.87%	96,339	12.07%	36,934	4.63%	38,966	4.88%	4,738	0.59%
Total	2,120,401	22.94%	1,772,500	19.18%	1,769,760	19.15%	1,281,325	13.86%	811,952	8.79%	583,898	6.32%	416,353	4.50%
Source: Permanent Electoral Authority

=== 2019 Romanian presidential election ===
County	Iohannis (PNL)	Dăncilă (PSD)	Barna (USR-PLUS)	Diaconu (PRO-ALDE)	Paleologu (PMP)	Kelemen (UDMR)	Bruynseels (PPU)	Cumpănașu (Ind.)	Cataramă (DL)	Stanoevici (Ind.)	Ivan (ADN)	Peia (PNeR)	Popescu (PNR)	Banu (PNRo)
Abroad	52.57%	2.68%	28.10%	3.61%	6.42%	0.51%	1.70%	2.43%	0.31%	0.42%	0.19%	0.36%	0.39%	0.30%
Source: HotNews

County	Iohannis (PNL)	Dăncilă (PSD)
Abroad	94.00%	6.00%
Source: HotNews

=== 2014 Romanian presidential election ===
County	Ponta (PSD)	Iohannis (ACL)	Tăriceanu (Ind.)	Udrea (PMP)	Macovei (Ind.)	Kelemen (UDMR)
Overseas voters	15.89%	46.17%	2.95%	9.78%	15.2%	<1%
Sources: Știrile Pro TV, Știrile Pro TV

County	Ponta (PSD)	Iohannis (ACL)
Overseas voters	10.26%	89.73%
Sources: HotNews.ro, Gândul

== See also ==
- Aromanian diaspora
- Moldovan diaspora
