= Romanians in Spain =

Romanian emigrant community in Spain

Total population
- 609,270 Romanian citizens (2025); 521,181 born in Romania (2025)

Languages
- Romanian, Spanish

Religion
- Predominantly: Romanian Orthodox; also: Greek Catholic, Roman Catholic

Related ethnic groups
- Romanian Britons, Romanian Italians, Romanian Germans, Romanian Australians, Romanian Americans, Romanian Canadians, Romanian French people

Romanians form the second largest group of foreigners in Spain, after Moroccans. As of 2025, there were 609,270 Romanian citizens and 521,181 people born in Romania living in Spain. Most of the immigration took place given economic reasons. The linguistic similarities between Romanian and Spanish, as well as Romanians' Romance identity, are also a reason for the country's attractiveness to Romanians.

== Background ==
After the December, 1989 Romanian Revolution, emigration was liberalized, but for the next few years, emigration to Spain was modest. It started to increase slowly during the late 1990s, and exploded after 2002. Emigration was further facilitated by the entry of Romania in the EU in 2007. By 2011, it reached a peak of nearly 900,000 people, after which the Romanian population has been steadily decreasing as a result of emigration from Spain since 2012 due to the economic problems and unemployment in Spain, as well as because of Romania's rapid economic improvement, falling to 623,097 by 2022. Because of this, the diaspora in Italy, which has stabilised in numbers above 1 million people, is now considerably larger than that in Spain.

== Population ==
Historical population
Year	Pop.	±%
1998	2,258	—
1999	3,147	+39.4%
2000	6,410	+103.7%
2001	31,641	+393.6%
2002	67,279	+112.6%
2003	137,347	+104.1%
2004	207,960	+51.4%
2005	317,366	+52.6%
2006	407,159	+28.3%
2007	527,019	+29.4%
2008	731,806	+38.9%
2009	798,892	+9.2%
2010	831,235	+4.0%
2011	865,707	+4.1%
2012	897,203	+3.6%
2013	870,258	−3.0%
2014	797,054	−8.4%
2015	752,268	−5.6%
2016	717,462	−4.6%
2017	687,733	−4.1%
2018	676,005	−1.7%
2019	671,985	−0.6%
2020	667,378	−0.7%
2021	644,473	−3.4%
2022	627,478	−2.6%
2023	629,755	+0.4%
2024	620,463	−1.5%
2025	609,270	−1.8%

Romanian diaspora in Spain is today the second Romanian diaspora in the EU, after that of Italy. Romanians in Spain have settled especially in the provinces of Madrid, Castellón, Valencia, Zaragoza and Barcelona.

As of 2014, one in every ten inhabitants of the city of Alcalá de Henares, in the Community of Madrid, were Romanian immigrants. Totaling 21,892 (10.6% of the city's population), this number decreased by 43.7% to 12,362 in 2025. Alcalá de Henares had one of the largest Romanian communities in Spain, which in 2006 founded the first Romanian political party of Spain, the Romanian Independent Party (Partido Independiente Rumano, PIR).

As of 2025–2026, the municipality of Fuente el Olmo de Fuentidueña in the Province of Segovia, Castile and León, was populated by a majority of Romanian immigrants.

As of 2026, out of some 520,000 Romanian-born people in Spain, only some 25,000, around 5%, had become naturalized.

In a 2026 analysis by newspaper ABC based on Centro de Investigaciones Sociológicas (CIS) polls from 2024 to 2026, Romanians scored as the second group of naturalized migrants in Spain most inclined to vote for right-wing parties, being surpassed by Venezuelans and Cubans, who scored the same.

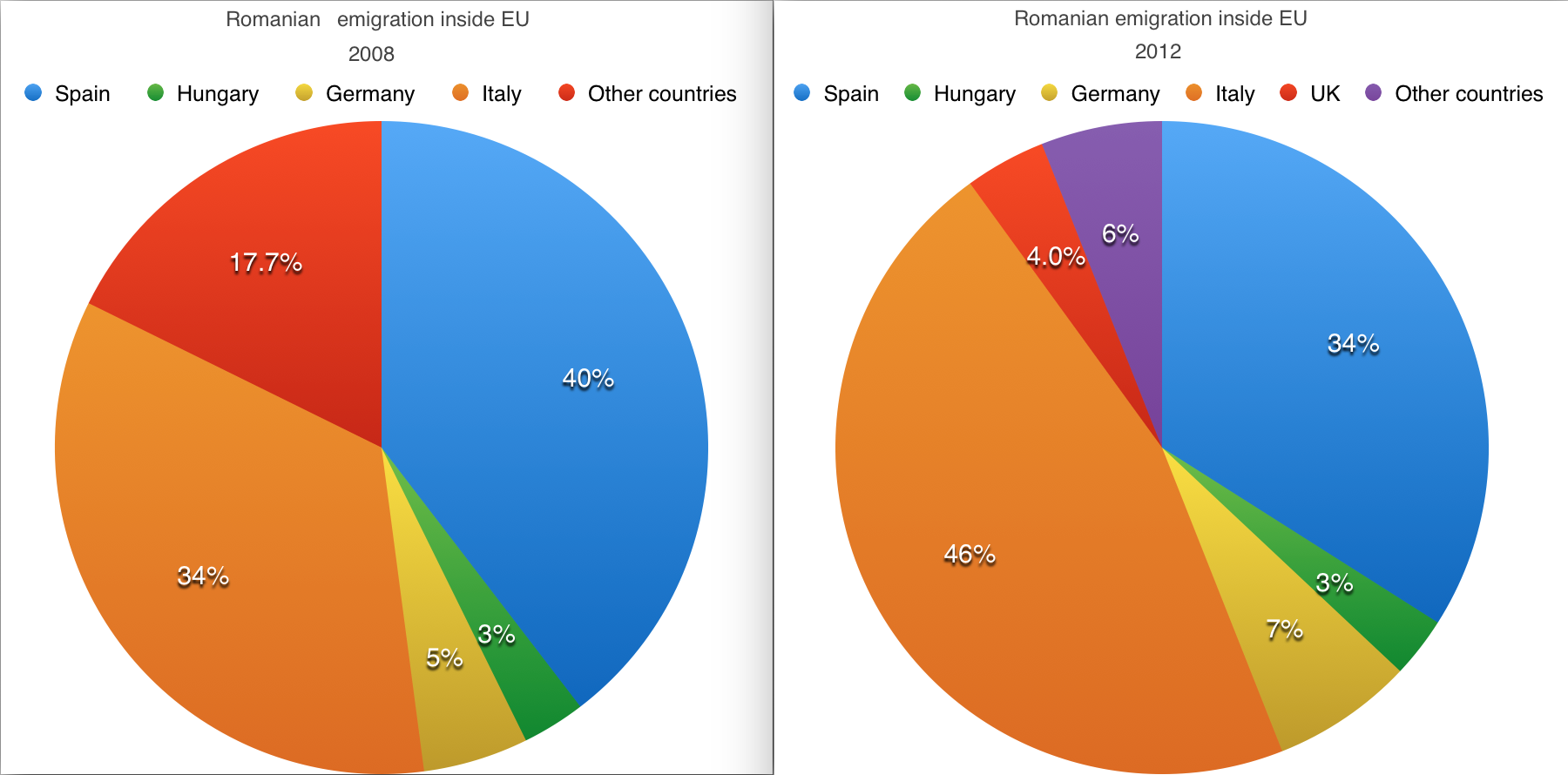
Romanian diaspora inside the EU between 2008 and 2012

== Notable individuals ==
- Florin Andone (born 1993), footballer
- Gelu Barbu (1932–2016), ballet dancer and choreographer
- Alexandru Buligan (born 1960), handball player and coach
- Mihaela Ciobanu (born 1973), handball player
- Cosmin Contra (born 1975), footballer and coach
- Gheorghe Craioveanu (born 1968), footballer
- Alexandru Dedu (born 1971), handball player
- Constantin Gâlcă (born 1972), footballer and coach
- Cristian Ganea (born 1992), footballer
- Adrian Ilie (born 1974), footballer
- Valeriu Lazarov (1935–2009), television producer, director of Spanish channel Telecinco
- Alina Nastase (born 1990), actress, model and director
- Gheorghe Popescu (born 1967), footballer
- Roxana Popa (born 1997), artistic gymnast
- Virgil Popa (born 1975), conductor
- Amelia Tiganus (born 1984), writer and abolitionist activist
- Marcela Topor (born 1976), journalist

== See also ==
- Romania–Spain relations
- Romance-speaking Europe
- Romanian diaspora
- Immigration to Spain
