= Castañé =

Castañé, Castañe or Castane may refer to:

== People ==
- Berta Castañé (born 2002), Spanish actress and model
- Carla Castañé (born 2005), Spanish actress and model
- Eric Otogo-Castane (born 1976), Gabonese association football
- Isabel Castañe (born 1946), Spanish former breaststroke and medley swimmer

== Other uses ==
- Fundación José María Castañé, Spanish cultural private institution dedicated to historic documents and research
