= Irene Arcos =

Spanish actress (born 1981)

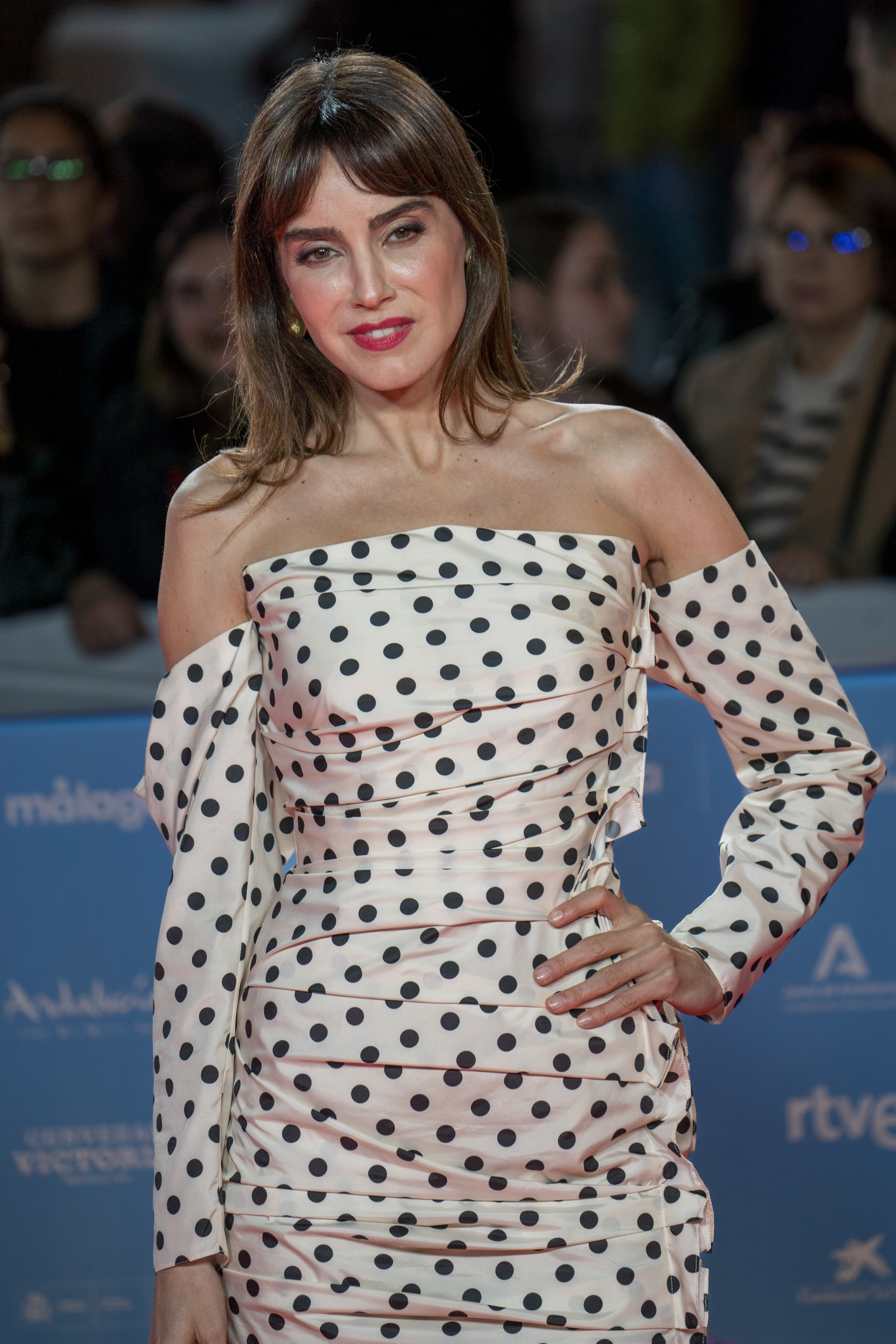
- Arcos in 2025
- Born: 25 July 1981 (age 43); Madrid, Spain
- Years active: 1996-present

Irene Arcos (Madrid, July 25, 1981) is a Spanish actress known mainly for her roles in television series. She made her debut in Los hombres de Paco (2008). Since then, she has been in popular shows like Élite (2018-2020) and El embarcadero (2019-2020).

== Biography ==
Arcos was born on July 25, 1981, in Madrid (Spain). Most of her family comes from Galicia, specifically from La Coruña. She graduated in audiovisual communication from the Complutense University of Madrid. However, she later found her vocation as an actress and studied drama at the Centro de Estudio Recabarrem, an acting school located in Madrid. In addition, she also took a series of courses related to acting.

== Professional career ==
She began working as a camera assistant after finishing her degree in audiovisual communication at the Complutense University of Madrid, in the well-known series of Hospital Central, for Telecinco. However, during this experience, she knew that her vocation was to be an actress, and so she decided to study theater for three years. First, she interpreted plays of great importance, such as La caja, Troyanas, Trainspotting or 12 meses. Later, she participated in Spanish fiction as an episodic character. In 2011, she had a recurring role in the series Hispania, playing Navia. Although her fame has come as a result of the series Vis a Vis and Élite, when she first became known on the national stage.

In 2019, it was announced that she would play Verónica in the Movistar+ fiction El embarcadero, alongside Álvaro Morte y Verónica Sánchez. She later participated in La valla and Madres.Amor y vida. At the end of 2020, her leading role was announced for the Movistar+ series Todos mienten, where she plays Macarena, a teacher who is involved in a sex scandal when a video of her high-content together with a student comes to light.

== Filmography ==
=== Cinema ===
Year	Title	Character	Directed by
2014	Trezze	Paula	Elbio Aparisi Nielsen
2018	Hacerse mayor y otros problemas	Paty	Clara Martínez-Lázaro

=== Television ===
Year	Title	Character	Channel	Duration
2008	Los hombres de Paco	Sol	Antena 3	1 episode
2009	Hospital Central	Angelina	Telecinco	1 episode
2009	Sin tetas no hay paraiso	Etra	Telecinco	1 episode
2009	Punta Escarlata	Extra	Telecinco	1 episode
2011	11-M, para que nadie lo olvide	Maribel	Telecinco	2 episodes
2011 - 2012	Hispania, la leyenda	Navia	Antena 3	8 episodes
2015	Sin identidad	Conchi	Antena 3	3 episodes
2015	Cuéntame cómo pasó	Secretaria	TVE	2 episodes
2015 - 2016	Vis a vis	Carolina	Antena 3	6 episodes
2016	El Caso: Crónica de sucesos	Eugenia	TVE	1 episode
2016	Seis hermanas	Dorisa	TVE	1 episode
2018 - 2020	Élite	Pilar Domínguez	Netflix	14 episodes
2019 - 2020	El embarcadero	Verónica Alfaro	Movistar+	16 episodes
2020	La valla	Emilia Noval	Antena 3	4 episodes
2020	Madres. Amor y vida	Claudia	Telecinco and Prime Video	11 episodes
2022	Todos mienten	Macarena	Movistar+	6 episodes

=== Theater ===
Year	Title	Directed by
2009 - 2011	Todas quieren ser Jacky Kennedy	Eduardo Recabarren
2013 - 2014	La caja	Gabriel Olivares
2013 - 2015	Lágrimas, mocos y sangre	Noé Denia and Oscar Sanz Cabrera
2014	Una historia de amor y miedo	Nacho López
2014 - 2015	Entreactos	Miguel Ángel Arcano
2015 - 2016	El cielo que me tienes prometido	Ana Diosdado
2017	12 meses	Nacho Redondo
2017 - 2018	Trainspotting	Fernando Soto
2018	Troyanas	Carmen Portacelli
2019 - 2021	Antígona	David Gaitán
2020 - 2021	Traición	Israel Elejalde

== Awards and nominations ==
Award	Year	Category	Nominated work	Result	Ref.
Fotogramas de Plata	2020	Best Actress in Theater	Traición	Nominated	
Spanish Actors Union	2020	Best Newcomer Actress	El embarcadero	Won	
