= Graduation Trip: Mallorca =

- Promotional release poster
- Spanish: Viaje de fin de curso: Mallorca
- Directed by: Paco Caballero
- Screenplay by: Eric Navarro; Natalia Durán
- Produced by: Antonio Asensio; Paloma Molina
- Starring: Yolanda Ramos; Berta Castañé; Sara Vidorreta; Claudia Roset; Nadia Vilaplana; Diego Garisa; Aiden Botía; Martí Cordero
- Production company: Zeta Studios
- Distributed by: Amazon Prime Video
- Release date: 30 May 2025
- Running time: 114 minutes
- Country: Spain
- Language: Spanish

Graduation Trip: Mallorca (Spanish: Viaje de fin de curso: Mallorca) is a 2025 Spanish comedy film directed by Paco Caballero and written by Eric Navarro and Natalia Durán. Its cast features Yolanda Ramos, Berta Castañé, and Sara Vidorreta, among others.

== Plot ==
2021. After a year of COVID-19 lockdown, a group of Bachillerato students and their teachers have the chance to be together for the last time, set to enjoy the best time of their lives during a trip to Mallorca, but a new COVID outbreak forces them to stay in their hotel rooms. Unwilling to let that ruin their experience, they throw a huge party losing control.

== Cast ==
- Yolanda Ramos as Ortrud
- Berta Castañé as Gala
- Sara Vidorreta as Nicky
- Claudia Roset a Sam
- Nadia Vilaplana as Rebecca
- Diego Garisa as Mario
- Aiden Botía as Toto
- Martí Cordero as Benja

== Production ==
Written by Eric Navarro and Natalia Durán, the plot is inspired by the real lockdown of 249 students in the Hotel Bellver of Mallorca in June 2021 because of a localised COVID-19 outbreak. The film is a Zeta Studios (Antonio Asensio and Paloma Molina) production for Amazon Prime Video. Shooting started in Barcelona in February 2024.

== Release ==
The film was released on Amazon Prime Video on 30 May 2025.

== Reception ==
Raquel Hernández Luján of HobbyConsolas gave the film 50 points ('so-so'), positively highlighting a hilarious Yolanda Ramos and the solvent young cast, while negatively citing the social discourse and the artificiality of the dialogue.

== See also ==
- List of Spanish films of 2025
