= Fowl Play (2026 film) =

- Theatrical release poster
- Spanish: Aves de corral
- Directed by: Antonio Vicent
- Written by: Antonio Vicent
- Produced by: Gianfranco Piccirillo
- Starring: Chechu Salgado; Diego Anido; Olivia Baglivi; Roberto Enríquez; Antonio Durán "Morris"; José Luis García Pérez; Roberto García; Álvaro Díaz; Ramon Robles; Belén Écija; Pedro Casablanc
- Cinematography: Alberto Pareja
- Edited by: Ángel Pazos
- Music by: Jorge Suárez
- Production companies: Delicias 13 Pictures; RV Entertainment
- Distributed by: Alfa Pictures
- Release dates: 17 February 2026 (Golem Alhóndiga); 6 March 2026 (Spain)
- Country: Spain
- Language: Spanish

Fowl Play (Spanish: Aves de corral) is a 2026 Spanish comedy thriller film written and directed by Antonio Vicent. The cast features Chechu Salgado, Diego Anido, and Olivia Baglivi, among others.

== Plot ==
The plans of a criminal gang for killing Santiago, a supposed high-ranking official of the CNI with savant syndrome, are upended by the engaged couple formed by Juan (Santiago's brother) and Casilda.

== Cast ==
- Chechu Salgado
- Diego Anido as Santiago
- Olivia Baglivi
- Roberto Enríquez
- Antonio Durán "Morris"
- José Luis García Pérez
- Roberto García
- Belén Écija
- Pedro Casablanc

== Production ==
Delicias 13 Pictures and RV Entertainment produced the film. Shooting took place in the Madrid region, in San Bartolomé de las Abiertas (province of Toledo) and in the Guadalajara region (1hour drive from Madrid). Alberto Pareja worked as cinematographer.

== Release ==
The film was programmed to premiere in the main competition of the 22nd Alicante Film Festival on 22 May 2025 but it self-excluded hours before the screening for, according to the director, "reasons unrelated to the festival". It eventually received a pre-screening at Cines Golem Alhóndiga in Bilbao organized by the Bilbao Fantasy Film Festival (FANT) on 17 February 2026. Distributed by Alfa Pictures, it was released theatrically in Spain on 6 March 2026.

It was released in 63 Spanish theaters on his opening weekend in what meant a promising opening for an independent film, but suffered brutally from being released just one week apart from Torrente Presidente, the last film of the Torrente saga that had a historic theatrical run in Spanish theaters (Sony distribution) leaving close to no media attention for the Spanish independent films released on those weeks such as Aves de Corral.

== Reception ==
Enid Román Almansa of Cinemanía rated the film 3 out of 5 stars, deeming the watch of the actors portraying the criminals of a gang for whom nothing ever goes right to be a pleasure.

In a 1-star rating, Manuel J. Lombardo of Diario de Sevilla lamented that "nothing [in the film] works or makes sense the way it should".

Because the film is Vicent’s directorial debut, the director is a candidate in the Spanish Film Awards (Goya Award) in the best Novel Director category.

Diego Anido also has been rumored to be among the top candidates for the Best Suporting Actor Spanish Award for his singular performance as Santiago in the movie.

== See also ==
- List of Spanish films of 2026
