= Fátima Baeza =

Spanish actress (born 1973)

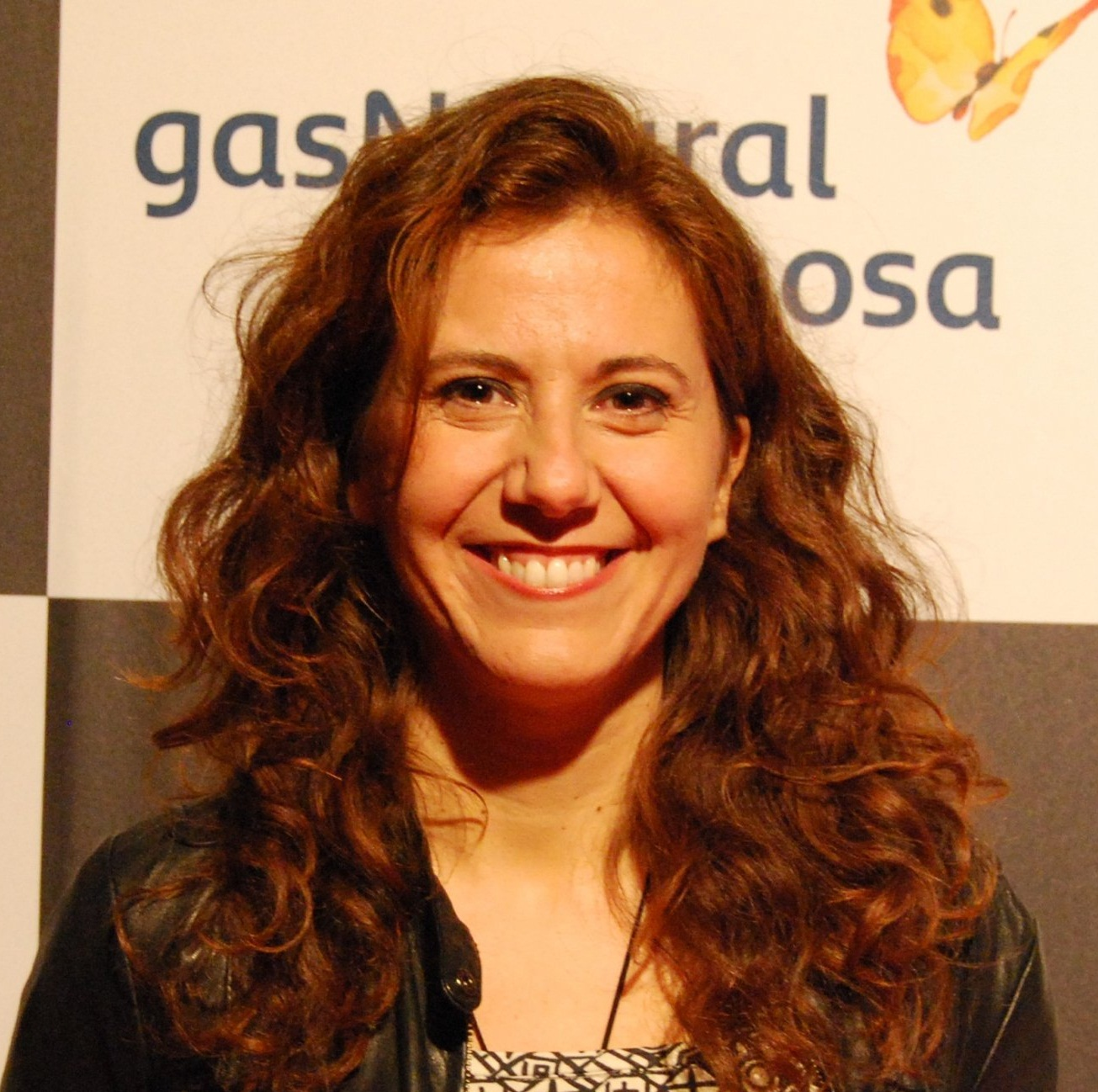
- Born: Fátima Baeza Medina; May 22, 1973 (age 53); Madrid, Spain
- Occupation: Actress
- Partner: Guillermo Ortega

Fátima Baeza Medina (born 22 May 1973) is a Spanish actress. A graduate of the Royal School of Dramatic Art (RESAD) in Madrid with a long background in the theatre, she became known to a wide audience for playing the nurse Esther García on the Telecinco medical drama Hospital Central, a role she held from the series' premiere in 2000 until 2011. Her character's relationship with the doctor Maca Fernández, played by Patricia Vico, became a milestone in Spanish television fiction and turned the two women into references for the LGBT community.

== Early life and career ==
Baeza studied at the Royal School of Dramatic Art in Madrid and developed an extensive career on stage before working in television. She made early guest appearances on Spanish series such as Farmacia de guardia, as Sister Mariví, Hermanas and El comisario before joining the cast of Hospital Central.

== Hospital Central ==
Baeza was part of the cast of Hospital Central from its 2000 premiere as the nurse Esther García. According to the actress, her role was originally minor and she was nearly written out of the series until a love story with the character Maca Fernández, played by the newly arrived Patricia Vico, gave her character continuity; the storyline became a hit and the two became icons for the LGBT community. After leaving the regular cast, she returned for a 2011 season finale that reunited several of the show's historic actors.

== Later work ==
After Hospital Central, Baeza continued working steadily in television, with roles in series such as Desaparecidos, HIT and Madres. In the Antena 3 drama Heridas (2022) she played the teacher Carmen, a role she has described as a reflection of contemporary society, while also working on the production as an acting coach. Alongside her acting, Baeza has worked as an acting coach, including coaching child performers. She also appeared in the short film Tótem Loba, directed by Verónica Echegui, which won the Goya Award for Best Short Fiction Film in 2022.

In May 2019 she initiated and starred in the stage show Miss Mara. Quien se reserva no es artista, a production of the Teatro Circo Price in Madrid based on her own research about the Spanish trapeze artist Miss Mara, directed by the company Teatro en Vilo and performed alongside trapeze artists. In 2025 she returned to the stage opposite her partner, the actor Guillermo Ortega, in Frankie y Johnny en el claro de luna, the Terrence McNally play directed by Pilar Massa at the Teatro Lara in Madrid. The production was staged in the theatre's Sala Lola Membrives.

== Personal life ==
Baeza has had a long-term relationship with the actor Guillermo Ortega, known for the series La que se avecina, with whom she has two children; the couple have also worked together on stage. Their daughter, Alma, who turned 18 in November 2025, has also begun a career in acting.

== Filmography ==
The following filmography is based on her professional film database profile.

=== Television ===
Year	Title	Role	Network
1991–1996	Farmacia de guardia	Sister Mariví	Antena 3
1998	Hermanas		Telecinco
1999	El comisario		Telecinco
2000–2011	Hospital Central	Esther García Ruiz	Telecinco
2011	Cheers	Luisa	Telecinco
2012	Toledo, cruce de destinos	Mother Zoe	Antena 3
2016	El secreto de Puente Viejo	Yolanda	Antena 3
2016	La sonata del silencio		La 1
2017	La zona	Carmen	Movistar+
2019	Hospital Valle Norte		La 1
2020	Desaparecidos		Telecinco
2020	Servir y proteger	Carmen Gómez	La 1
2020	Madres. Amor y vida	Charo	Telecinco
2020	30 monedas	Vergara's mother	HBO
2021	Vida perfecta		Movistar+
2021	HIT	Sonsoles	La 1
2022	Heridas	Carmen	Antena 3
2023	Mía es la venganza	Elena del Pino	Telecinco
2023–2024	Invisible		Disney+

=== Film ===
Year	Title	Director
2001	Las flores de Bach	Juan Flahn
2008	El amor se mueve	Mercedes Afonso
2011	Maktub	Paco Arango
2024	Padre no hay más que uno 4: Campanas de boda	Santiago Segura

=== Short films ===
Year	Title	Director
2004	Campos de luz	María Casal
2005	Lo que tú quieras oír	Guillermo Zapata
2005	Queridos reyes magos	Tirso Calero
2020	Tótem Loba	Verónica Echegui
2023	El primer beso	Miguel Lafuente
