= The Time It Takes =

The Time It Takes may refer to:

- The Time It Takes (TV series), a 2021 Spanish television series
- The Time It Takes (film), a 2024 Italian-French drama film
