= Evil Dress =

- Theatrical release poster
- Spanish: El vestido
- Directed by: Jacob Santana
- Screenplay by: Frank Ariza; Marco Lagarde
- Produced by: Frank Ariza; Manu Vega; Carmen Aguado
- Starring: Belén Rueda; Vera Centenera
- Cinematography: Christos Voudouris
- Edited by: Pablo Gómez Pan; Iván de Paz
- Music by: María Vertiz
- Production companies: AF Films; Forgotten 2 Entertainment
- Distributed by: AF Pictures
- Release date: 13 February 2026
- Country: Spain
- Language: Spanish

Evil Dress (Spanish: El vestido, lit. 'the dress') is a 2026 Spanish supernatural horror film directed by Jacob Santana. It stars Belén Rueda and Vera Centenera.

== Plot ==
Divorced Alicia moves with her daughter Carla to an old house aiming to start off a new life, only to find it to be marked by a dark past. Channeling a connection to a ghost girl via a blue dress, Carla's behaviour begins to display strange patterns, worrying her mother.

== Cast ==
- Belén Rueda as Alicia
- Vera Centenera as Carla
- Belén Écija as Paulina
- Elena Irureta

== Production ==
The film was produced by AF Films and Forgotten 2 Entertainment with the association of E-Media Canary Project and Match Point. It was shot in the Canary Islands.

== Release ==
Distributed by AF Pictures, Evil Dress was released theatrically in Spain on 13 February 2026.

== Reception ==
Manuel J. Lombardo of Diario de Sevilla gave Evil Dress a 1-star rating, declaring the film "a parade of clichés and cheap scares".

Juan Pando of Fotogramas rated the film 3 out of 5 stars, assessing that Santana demonstrates trade skills and fulfils the essential requirement of entertaining.

Paula Hernández Platero of Cinemanía rated the film 2½ out of 5 stars, lamenting that "nothing in the film is surprising, and the only plot twist that occurs in the storyline passes without incident".

Raquel Hernández Luján of HobbyConsolas gave the film a score of 47 points, considering that it wastes its potential by opting for "an incoherent denouement and an awkward setting designed to appeal to the international market".

== See also ==
- List of Spanish films of 2026
