= HIT (TV series) =

2020 Spanish television series

- Promotional poster
- Genre: Drama
- Created by: Joaquín Oristrell
- Directed by: Joaquín Oristrell; Álvaro Fernández Armero; Elena Trapé; Polo Menárguez
- Starring: Daniel Grao; Carmen Arrufat; Nourdín Batán; María Rivera; Oriol Cervera; Gabriel Guevara Mourreau; Leire Cabezas; Ignacio Hidalgo; Krista Aroca; Melías; Marta Larralde; Álvaro de Juana; Carlota Gurpegui; Son Khoury; Alba del Ángel; Jacobo Camarena; Teresa de Mera; Manuel Soler; Claudia Licari; Leonor Pernas
- Country of origin: Spain
- Original language: Spanish
- No. of seasons: 3
- No. of episodes: 28

Production
- Production companies: RTVE; Grupo Ganga

Original release
- Network: La 1; RTVE Play
- Release: 21 September 2020 – 3 September 2024

HIT is a Spanish high school-themed drama television series created by Joaquín Oristrell that began airing on 21 September 2020. Produced by Radiotelevisión Española (RTVE) in collaboration with Grupo Ganga and starring Daniel Grao as Hugo Ibarra Toledo, an unconventional educator, the series is focused on problems in high school, such as violence, harassment, and bullying.

== Premise ==
It is set in a fictional high school in Madrid. Coexistence at the Instituto Anna Frank has become untenable. If the high school is to remain open, a way out of the news pages needs to be found. Ester, the director of the centre, seeks help from Hugo Ibarra Toledo (HIT), an unconventional educator.

The second season moves to the IES León Felipe, in Puertollano, where Ibarra tries to help a group of nine vocational training students. Upon Ibarra's eventual relapse into alcoholism, he meets up again with Lena (an alumn from the Anna Frank) in a rehab centre.

== Cast ==
Introduced in season 1

- Daniel Grao as Hugo Ibarra Toledo, HIT.
- Carmen Arrufat as Elena "Lena" Vallejo Posse.
- Olaya Caldera as Ester.
- Gabriel Guevara as Darío.
- Leire Cabezas as Marga.
- Nourdin Batán as Nourdin.
- Oriol Cervera as Gus.
- María Rivera as Silvia.
- Krista Aroka as Erika.
- Ignacio Hidalgo as Andrés.
- Melías as Jaco.
- Rebeca Sala as Carla.
- Luisa Vides as Maya.

Introduced in season 2

- Marta Larralde as Francis.
- Son Khoury as Matt.
- Alba de Ángel as Chelo.
- Jacobo Camarena as Teo.
- Teresa de Mera as Carmen.
- Álvaro de Juana as Román.
- Carlota Gurpegui as Paula.
- Leonor Pernas as Daniela.
- Claudia Licari as Lucía.
- Manuel Soler as Jota.
- Chema del Barco.
- Fátima Baeza.
- Ramiro Alonso.
- Teresa Hurtado.
- Raúl Jiménez.
- David Bustamante as himself

Introduced in season 3

- Alejandro Jato as Raúl
- Francisca Aronsson as Abi
- Ton Vieira as Tom
- Juan Grandinetti as Christian
- Roger Sahuquillo as Marc
- Andy Duato as Nora
- Mitch Martín as Israel
- Carlota Trueba as Julia
- Miranda Gallego as Yol
- Josito Peña as Sergio
- Carmen Balagué
- Nur Levi
- Mario Gas

== Production and release ==
Created by Joaquín Oristrell, the latter co-directed the series together with Álvaro Fernández Armero and Elena Trapé. Shooting started by January 2020, taking place in Madrid. Following a hiatus caused by the COVID-19 lockdown, it resumed on 22 June 2020 and it wrapped on 24 July 2020. The release date of the series was also delayed due to the COVID-19 pandemic. The first episode was pre-screened at the 23rd Málaga Film Festival on 27 August 2020.

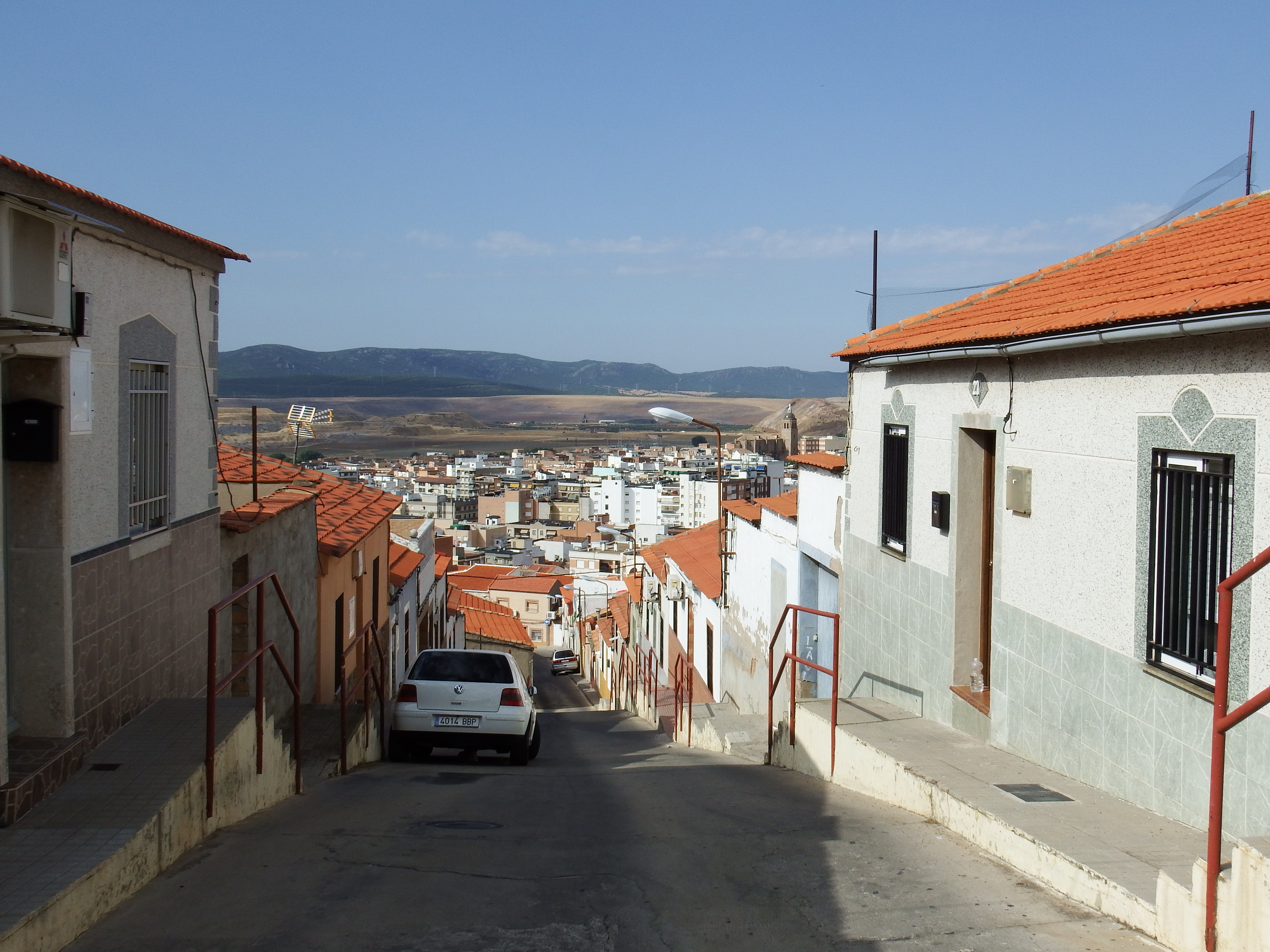
Shooting of season 2 took place in Puertollano.

The first episode premiered on 21 September 2020, commanding a 10% share of the audience, and remained roughly stable for the rest of the series (10 episodes), with a 9.2% average. Following the good audience results (the most watched Spanish free-to-air fiction series in the season) and a good critical reception, the renovation of the series for a second season was announced in November 2020.

Filming of season 2 started in May 2021 in Mejorada del Campo. Season 2 (consisting also of 10 episodes) brought a wholly new fictional setting in Puertollano and a revamped cast, with three actors returning: Daniel Grao, Rebeca Sala and Luisa Vides. The writing team, led by Oristrell, also featured Yolanda García Serrano, Jacobo Delgado, Luis Caballero, and Pablo Bartolomé. Directors of season 2 include Elena Trapé and Polo Menarguez. The first episode of season 2 was pre-screened on 9 September 2021 at Cine Callao in Madrid. The trailer for season 2 was released afterwards. The series' first season began airing on RTL Deutschland's TVNOW on 15 September 2021. On 14 October 2021, RTVE disclosed the 21 October 2021 premiere date, later revealing a pre-screening on RTVE Play predating by some hours the linear broadcasting on La 1.

On 20 April 2022, RTVE announced the renovation of the series for a third season, to be shot in La Palma.

== Episodes ==
Series	Episodes	Originally released		
Series	Episodes	First released	Last released	Network
1	10	21 September 2020	23 November 2020	La 1
2	10	21 October 2021	23 December 2021	RTVE Play
3	8	16 July 2024	3 September 2024	La 1

=== Season 1 ===
No. overall	No. in season	Title	Directed by	Written by	Original release date
1	1	"La infección"	Joaquín Oristrell	Yolanda García Serrano, Pablo Bartolomé & Joaquín Oristrell	21 September 2020
2	2	"La consulta"	Joaquín Oristrell	Yolanda García Serrano & Joaquín Oristrell	28 September 2020
3	3	"El diagnóstico"	Álvaro Fernández Armero	Jacobo Delgado & Joaquín Oristrell	5 October 2020
4	4	"La limpia"	Álvaro Fernández Armero	Pablo Bartolomé & Joaquín Oristrell	12 October 2020
5	5	"El cuerpo"	Elena Trapé	Yolanda García Serrano & Joaquín Oristrell	19 October 2020
6	6	"La recaída"	Elena Trapé	Jacobo Delgado & Joaquín Oristrell	26 November 2020
7	7	"Cuidados intensivos"	Álvaro Fernández Armero	Pablo Bartolomé & Joaquín Oristrell	2 November 2020
8	8	"El historial"	Álvaro Fernández Armero	Yolanda García Serrano & Joaquín Oristrell	9 November 2020
9	9	"Los exámenes"	Elena Trapé	Jacobo Delgado & Joaquín Oristrell	16 November 2020
10	10	"El alta médica"	Elena Trapé	Yolanda García Serrano, Jacobo Delgado & Joaquín Oristrell	23 November 2020

=== Season 2 ===
No. overall	No. in season	Title	Directed by	Written by	Original release date
11	1	"Melapela"	Joaquín Oristrell	Joaquín Oristrell	21 October 2021
12	2	"Desconexión"	Joaquín Oristrell	Jacobo Delgado & Joaquín Oristrell	28 October 2021
13	3	"Consiento"	Elena Trapé	Yolanda García Serrano & Joaquín Oristrell	4 November 2021
14	4	"Autocontrol"	Elena Trapé	Luis Caballero & Joaquín Oristrell	11 November 2021
15	5	"Ilusión"	Polo Menárguez	Yolanda García Serrano & Joaquín Oristrell	18 November 2021
16	6	"Autoestima"	Polo Menárguez	Luis Caballero & Joaquín Oristrell	25 November 2021
17	7	"Pertenencia"	Polo Menárguez	Jacobo Delgado & Joaquín Oristrell	2 December 2021
18	8	"Resistencia"	Polo Menárguez	Pablo Bartolomé, Luis Caballero & Joaquín Oristrell	9 December 2021
19	9	"Corazón"	Joaquín Oristrell	Yolanda García Serrano & Joaquín Oristrell	16 December 2021
20	10	"Reinicio"	Joaquín Oristrell	Jacobo Delgado & Joaquín Oristrell	23 December 2021

=== Season 3 ===
No. overall	No. in season	Title	Directed by	Written by	Original release date
21	1	"Alicia en el pais de las maravillas"	Joaquín Oristrell	Joaquín Oristrell & Pablo Barlotomé	16 July 2024
22	2	"Peter Pan"	Joaquín Oristrell	Joaquín Oristrell & Luis Caballero	23 July 2024
23	3	"La Sirenita"	Samantha López Speranza	Joaquín Oristrell & Yolanda García Serrano	30 July 2024
24	4	"La reina de las nieves"	Samantha López Speranza	Joaquín Oristrell, Marcos Castro Belenda & Sara Valenzuela Monreal	6 August 2024
25	5	"La bella y la bestia"	Luis Arribas	Joaquín Oristrell & Yolanda García Serrano	13 August 2024
26	6	"Pinocho"	Luis Arribas	Joaquín Oristrell & Luis Caballero	20 August 2024
27	7	"La cenicienta"	Joaquín Oristrell	Joaquín Oristrell & Yolanda García Serrano	27 August 2024
28	8	"Caperucita roja"	Joaquín Oristrell	Joaquín Oristrell & Luis Caballero	3 September 2024

== Viewership figures ==
Season 1
Episode	01	02	03	04	05	06	07	08	09	10	Avg.	Ref
Million viewers	1.546	1.485	1.419	1.542	1.606	1.410	1.496	1.393	1.496	1.505	1.490	
Share (%)	10.0	9.5	8.8	9.6	10.1	8.6	9.0	8.2	8.8	9.1	9.2	

== Awards and nominations ==
Year	Award	Category	Nominee(s)	Result	Ref.
2021	8th MiM Series Awards	Best Drama Series		Nominated	
2021	8th MiM Series Awards	Best Drama Actor	Daniel Grao	Nominated	
2022	30th Actors and Actresses Union Awards	Best Television Actress in a Minor Role	Rebeca Sala	Nominated	
