= Fuente el Olmo de Fuentidueña =

- Municipality
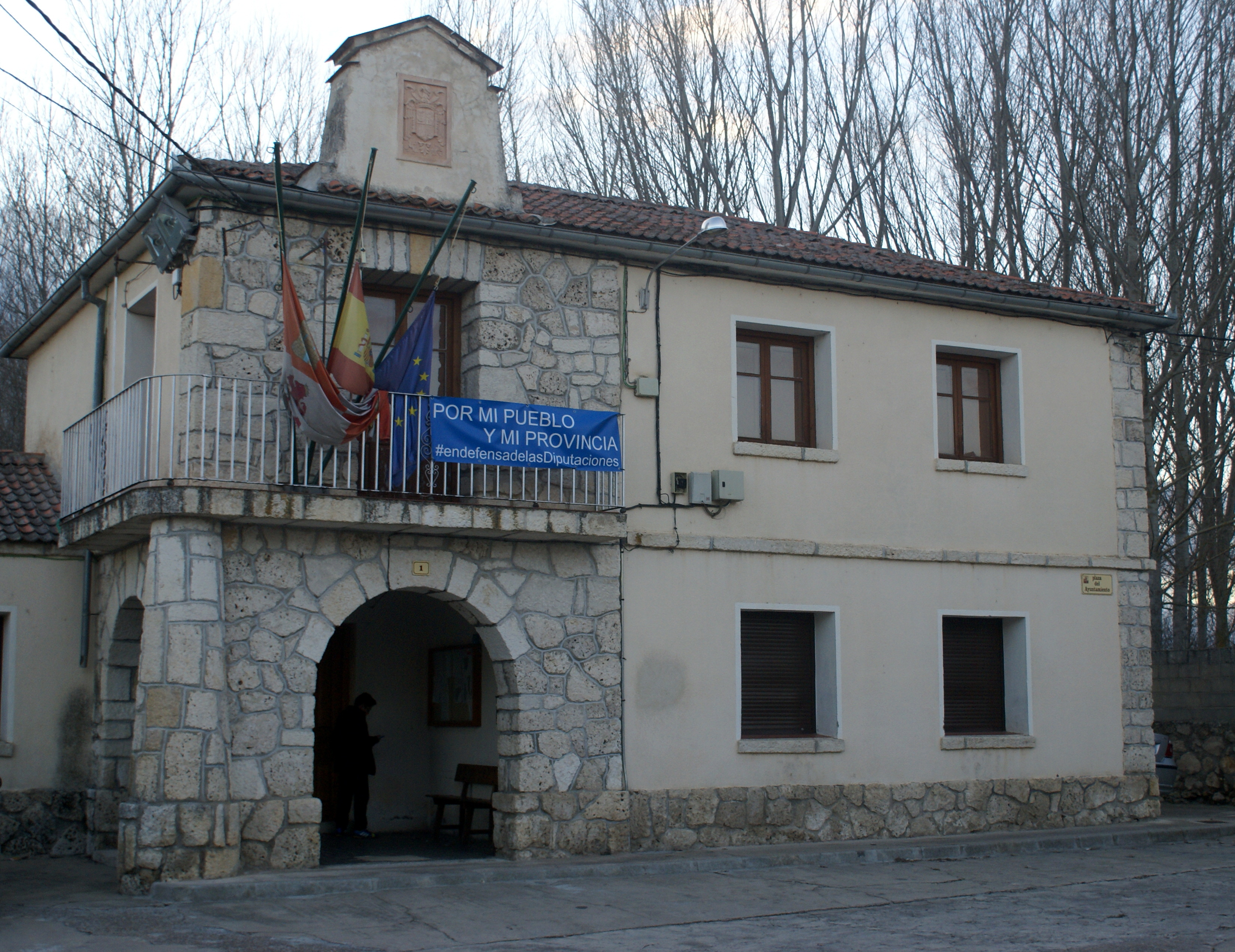
- Town Hall of Fuente el Olmo de Fuentidueña

- Location in Spain. Fuente el Olmo de Fuentidueña (Spain)
- Coordinates: 41°23′N 4°00′W
- Country: Spain
- Autonomous community: Castile and León
- Province: Segovia
- Municipality: Fuente el Olmo de Fuentidueña

Area
  - Total: 30 km^{2} (12 sq mi)

Population (2025-01-01)
  - Total: 396
  - Density: 13/km^{2} (34/sq mi)
- Time zone: UTC+1 (CET)
  - Summer (DST): UTC+2 (CEST)
- Website: Official website

Fuente el Olmo de Fuentidueña is a municipality located in the province of Segovia, Castile and León, Spain. According to the 2004 census (INE), the municipality has a population of 124 inhabitants.

Fuente el Olmo de Fuentidueña later experienced an enormous population growth, with an increase of 192.59%, going from 135 inhabitants in 2021 to 396 in 2024, with 325 being foreigners. A majority of the village's population came to be composed by Romanian immigrants; as of 2026, 298 out of 395 people registered in the municipality had been born in Romania. Amid this demographic change, the village was visited by Florea Tiberiu Trifan, the Romanian consul in Madrid, on 4 March 2026. Other groups that migrated to the village were Moroccans and Nigeriens.
