= The Best Heart Attack of My Life =

- El mejor infarto de mi vida
- Genre: Comedy drama
- Starring: Alan Sabbagh; Olivia Molina
- Countries of origin: Argentina; Spain
- Original language: Spanish
- No. of seasons: 1
- No. of episodes: 6

Production
- Production locations: Montevideo; Buenos Aires; Madrid
- Cinematography: Paco Belda
- Editors: Miguel Colombo; Andrés Quaranta; Leandro Bruno
- Running time: 29–39 minutes
- Production companies: Pampa Films; Tandem Films; Gloriamundi Producciones

Original release
- Network: Disney+
- Release: 24 January 2025

The Best Heart Attack of My Life (Spanish: El mejor infarto de mi vida) is a 2025 Disney+ television miniseries based on the 2017 book El mejor infarto de mi vida by Hernán Casciari, which recounts the true story of the author who suffered a heart attack in the short-term rental home where he was staying in Uruguay, being saved by the quick actions of his Uruguayan hosts—an experience that marked a turning point and led him to rethink his personal and professional path.

== Premise ==
The Best Heart Attack of My Life follows Ariel (Alan Sabbagh), a writer in his 40s working at a publishing house, who, after being left by his wife and facing health issues, travels to Montevideo, Uruguay, to attend a literary event accompanied by Concha (Olivia Molina) a Spanish flamenco dancer he has just met. During their stay in a house rented through a digital short-term rental platform, he suffers a heart attack but is saved thanks to the quick intervention of his hosts. This experience prompts him to rethink his life path and relationships, beginning a profound personal transformation.

== Cast ==
=== Main ===
- Alan Sabbagh as Ariel Santoro, a 40-year-old writer recently left by his wife who suffers a heart attack during a trip to Uruguay.
- Olivia Molina as Concha, a Spanish flamenco dancer who meets Ariel during her performances in Buenos Aires, and who seeks to escape her strict gitano family
- Rogelio Gracia Bernada as Javier, Ariel's Uruguayan host who designed an app to find dialysis centers in different cities.
- Romina Peluffo as Alejandra, Javier's wife and Ariel's Uruguayan host.

=== Recurring ===
- Eleonora Wexler as Isabel, Ariel’s athletic and healthy-living wife.
- Rita Cortese as Roberta, Ariel's strong-willed mother.
- Sebastián Berta Muñiz as David, Ariel’s friend and boss who encourages him to move forward.
- Rafael Spregelburd as Augusto Briganti, the conceited high-profile lawyer whose biography Ariel must write.
- Daniel Holguín Macías as Joni, Concha's suitor and part of the flamenco band.
- Imanol Arias as Yayo, Concha's uncle and the family patriarch.

=== Guest ===
- Brian Maya as Joe Gebbia, co-founder of Airbnb, who travels to Uruguay to meet Javier and Alejandra after learning Ariel's story.

== Production ==
=== Development ===
In January 2020, Hernán Casciari announced that he had signed with The Walt Disney Company Latin America to adapt his memoir El mejor infarto de mi vida into a film planned for release in 2021 under the production of Gloriamundi and Wip. However, in February 2022, it was reported that the project had changed course, shifting its adaptation to a television series developed by Agustín Bossi and Pablo Bossi, directors of the Pampa Films studio.

=== Filming ===
Filming began in March 2022 and took place in Argentina, Spain, and Uruguay. In Montevideo, it was shot in various locations, including the Carrasco neighborhood, Plaza de Cagancha, the World Trade Center, and the surroundings of the Centenario Stadium.

=== Release ===
The trailer for the series was released on January 8, 2025. The series finally premiered on January 24 on Disney+ and Hulu.

== Reception ==
In December 2025, Disney announced that The Best Heart Attack of My Life was among the most-watched international original series released on Disney+ in 2025.
