= 4 estrellas =

- Genre: Soap opera; Comedy-drama
- Created by: Daniel Écija; Ángel Turlán; Borja González Santaolalla
- Country of origin: Spain
- Original language: Spanish
- No. of seasons: 3
- No. of episodes: 259

Production
- Executive producers: Daniel Écija; Javier Lorenzo; Mar Díaz
- Production companies: RTVE; Good Mood

Original release
- Network: TVE
- Release: 23 April 2023 – 10 October 2024

4 estrellas is a Spanish television soap opera that began airing on TVE on 23 April 2023. Its broadcasting run on RTVE Play ended on 10 October 2024.

== Premise ==
The plot follows starts off with the return of Clara Rojo to her hometown of Vera del Rey as she finds out about her status as the secret (and third) daughter of Ricardo Lasierra, deceased owner of a hotel. She also comes across old flame Julio, now managing the "Bar Chelsea".

== Cast ==
- Toni Acosta as Clara Rojo
- Marta Aledo as Silvia Lasierra
- Dafne Fernández as Marta Lasierra
- Ana Gracia as Rita Vázquez
- Antonio Resines as Ricardo Lasierra
- David Lorente as Javier Romaña
- Raúl Prieto as Julio Conde
- Alejandro Albarracín as Andrés Herrero
- Ana Jara as Luz Romaña
- Martí Cordero as Jon Romaña
- Marina Baeza as Sara Rojo
- Rosario Pardo as Marifrán Villullas
- Francesca Piñón as Cuca Sampedro
- Gonzalo Caps as José Antonio Conde
- Antonio Molero as Arturo Pérez Sañudo
- Álvaro Fontalba as Cabo Martínez
- Belén Écija as Ainhoa Arminza
- Édgar Vittorino as Paolo Romero
- Carolina Rubio as Menchu
- Francis Lorenzo as Rafael Albalad Ortiz
- Marta Guerras as Paula Albalad Medina
- Elisa Matilla as Paz Medina Aguado
- Jorge Suquet as Tristán Civera Suárez
- Nacho López as Diego Blanco
- Secun de la Rosa as Leo Albalad
- Aleida Torrent as Maite Pérez Cano
- Ismael Martín as Pedro Beltrán Arminza
- Álex Mola as Lucas Beltrán del Alba
- Chani Martín as Miguel Romaña Plaza
- Pepa Aniorte as Rosa Quintanilla García
- Iván Vigara as Dani Romaña Quintanilla
- Estefanía de los Santos as Angelita Vargas Losada
- Belinda Washington as Blanca Vázquez
- Rodrigo Poisón as Yago Acín
- Sergio Mur as Jorge Acín
- Alejandro Gonzalo as Pablo Acín
- Oliver Ruano as padre Alejandro
- Javi Coll as Sergio Ibáñez
- Ane Gabarain as Diana Ibáñez
- Sara Vidorreta as Nuria Ibáñez
- Denisse Peña as Desi
- Nuria Herrero as Bea
- Francesco Arca as Andrea

== Production ==
The series is a Good Mood and RTVE production. the series was created by Daniel Écija, Ángel Turlán, and Borja González Santaolalla. After the broadcast of the first two episodes, González Santaolalla vented that one of the co-writers credited onscreen as responsible for the screenplay (and assumed to be Écija) had not written a single line of dialogue. Indoor footage was shot in the Toboggan Studios in Boadilla del Monte, while Covarrubias served for some outdoor shots portraying the fictional village of Vera del Rey.

== Release ==
The series debuted on 23 April 2023 simultaneously on La 1, La 2, Clan, and RTVE Play. The second season premiered on 12 December 2023. In February 2024, RTVE renovated the series for a third season, which premiered on 30 April 2024.

== Accolades ==
| Year | Award | Category | Nominee(s) | Result | Ref. |
|---|---|---|---|---|---|
| 2024 | 35th GLAAD Media Awards | Outstanding Spanish-language Scripted Television Series | | Nominated | |

== See also ==
- 2023 in Spanish television
