= Carmen Arrufat =

Spanish actress (born 2002)

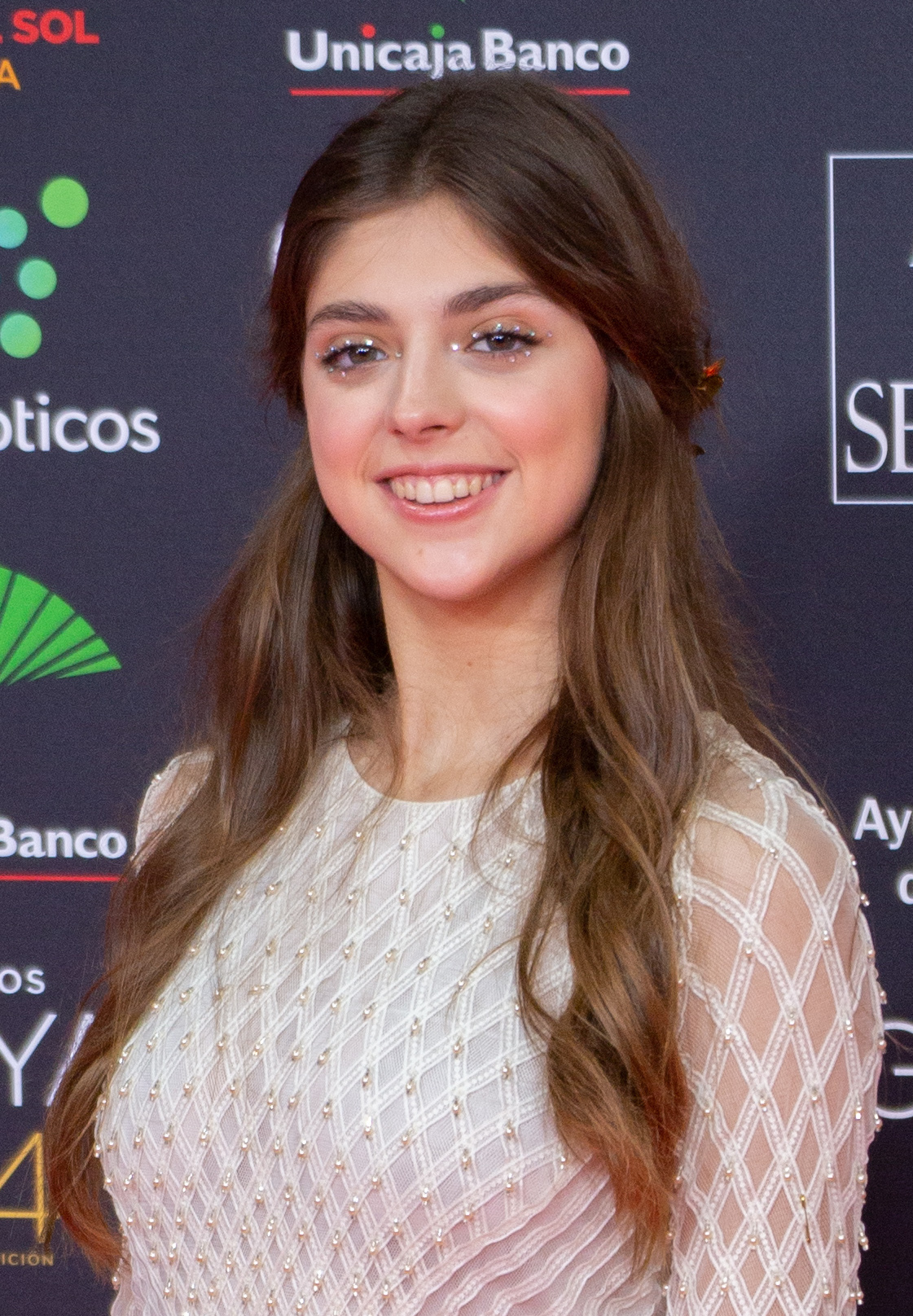
- Arrufat at the 34th Goya Awards in 2020
- Born: Carmen Arrufat Blasco; 11 October 2002 (age 24); Castellón de la Plana, Spain
- Occupation: Actress

Carmen Arrufat Blasco (born 11 October 2002) is a Spanish film and television actress. Her performance in The Innocence earned her a nomination to the Goya Award for Best New Actress. She became known to a television audience for her villainess role in the television series HIT.

== Biography ==
=== Early life ===
Born on 11 October 2002 in Castellón de la Plana, Arrufat took acting courses since she was 11 year old, and she trained at Aula Cine y TV, a drama school operated by Víctor Antolí.

=== Career ===
Arrufat debuted as a leading actress in a feature film in the 2019 drama The Innocence (she lied about her age being 16 while she was still 15 in order to get the role). Her performance earned her a nomination to the Goya Award for Best New Actress. She moved to Madrid and she was cast for the role of the manipulative and narcissist Lena Vallejo in the television series HIT. Shooting of the series started in January 2020, but it was interrupted by the COVID-19 lockdown, so Arrufat rather performed a teenager trapped with her family during the COVID-19 lockdown in the comedy series Diarios de la cuarentena, aired from April to May 2020 on La 1. The filming of HIT resumed in June 2020 after a hiatus and it wrapped in July. Later in 2020, Arrufat was cast in the Movistar+ thriller series Todos mienten. She also joined the main cast of Elite's season 6.

== Filmography ==
=== Film ===
Year	Title	Role	Notes	Ref
2019	La innocència (The Innocence)	Lis	Lead role	
2019	Nada será igual			
2026	Morir no siempre sale bien (To Die Is Not Always Good Business)	Maribel		

=== Television ===
Year	Title	Role	Notes	Ref
2020	Diarios de la cuarentena			
2020–2021	HIT	Lena Vallejo Posse	Main (season 1); guest appearance in season 2 finale	
2022	Todos mienten	Natalia	Main	
2022–2024	Élite	Sara	Main cast (season 6–8), 23 episodes	

== Accolades ==
Year	Award	Category	Work	Result	Ref.
2019	2nd Valencian Audiovisual Awards	Best Actress	The Innocence	Won	
2020	75th CEC Medals	Best New Actress	The Innocence	Nominated	
2020	34th Goya Awards	Best New Actress	The Innocence	Nominated	
