= Belén Rueda =

Spanish actress

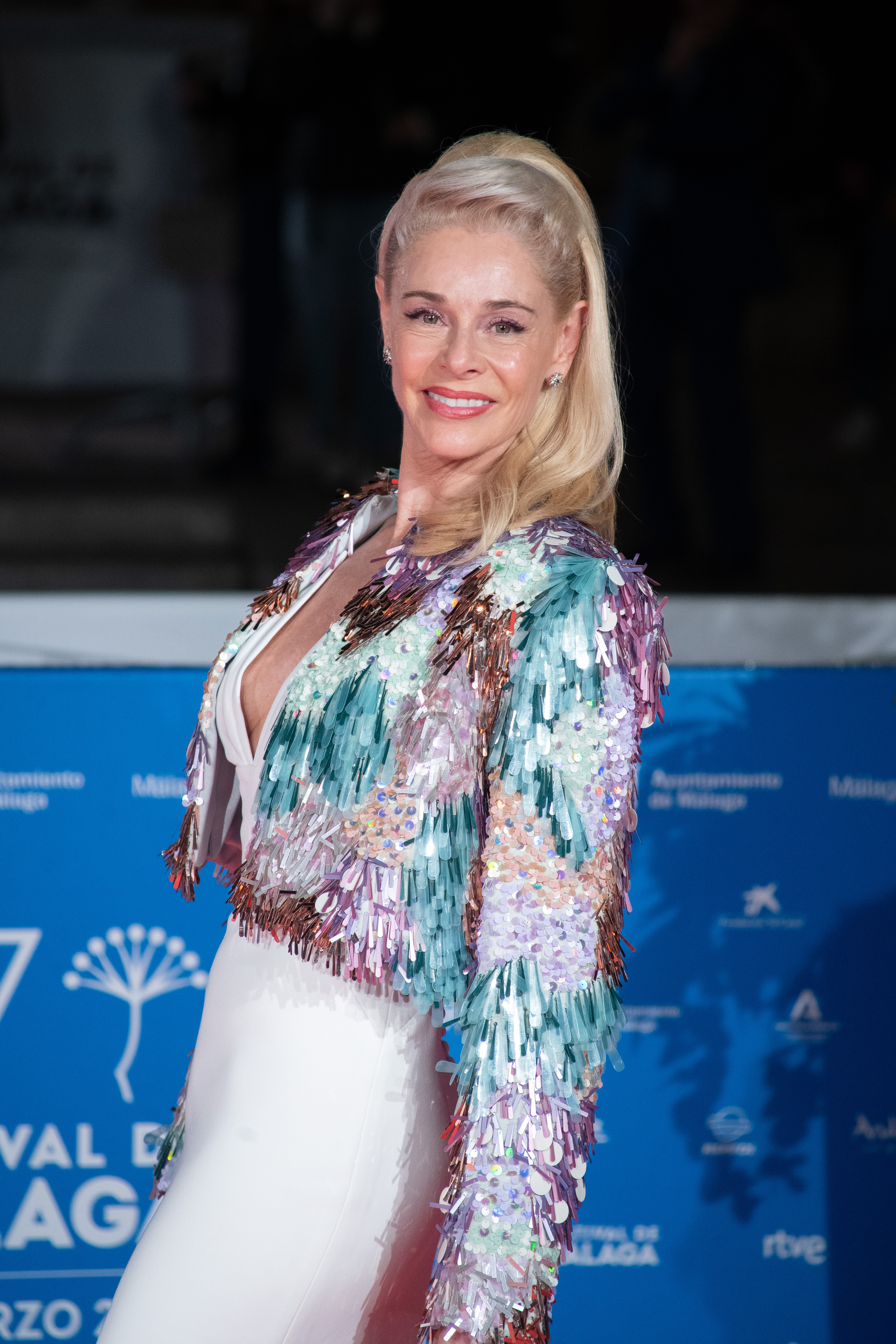
- Rueda in 2024
- Born: María Belén Rueda García-Porrero; 16 March 1965 (age 61); Madrid, Spain
- Occupation: Actress
- Years active: 1990-present
- Spouse: Daniel Écija (m. 2003; div. 2004)
- Children: 3, including Belén

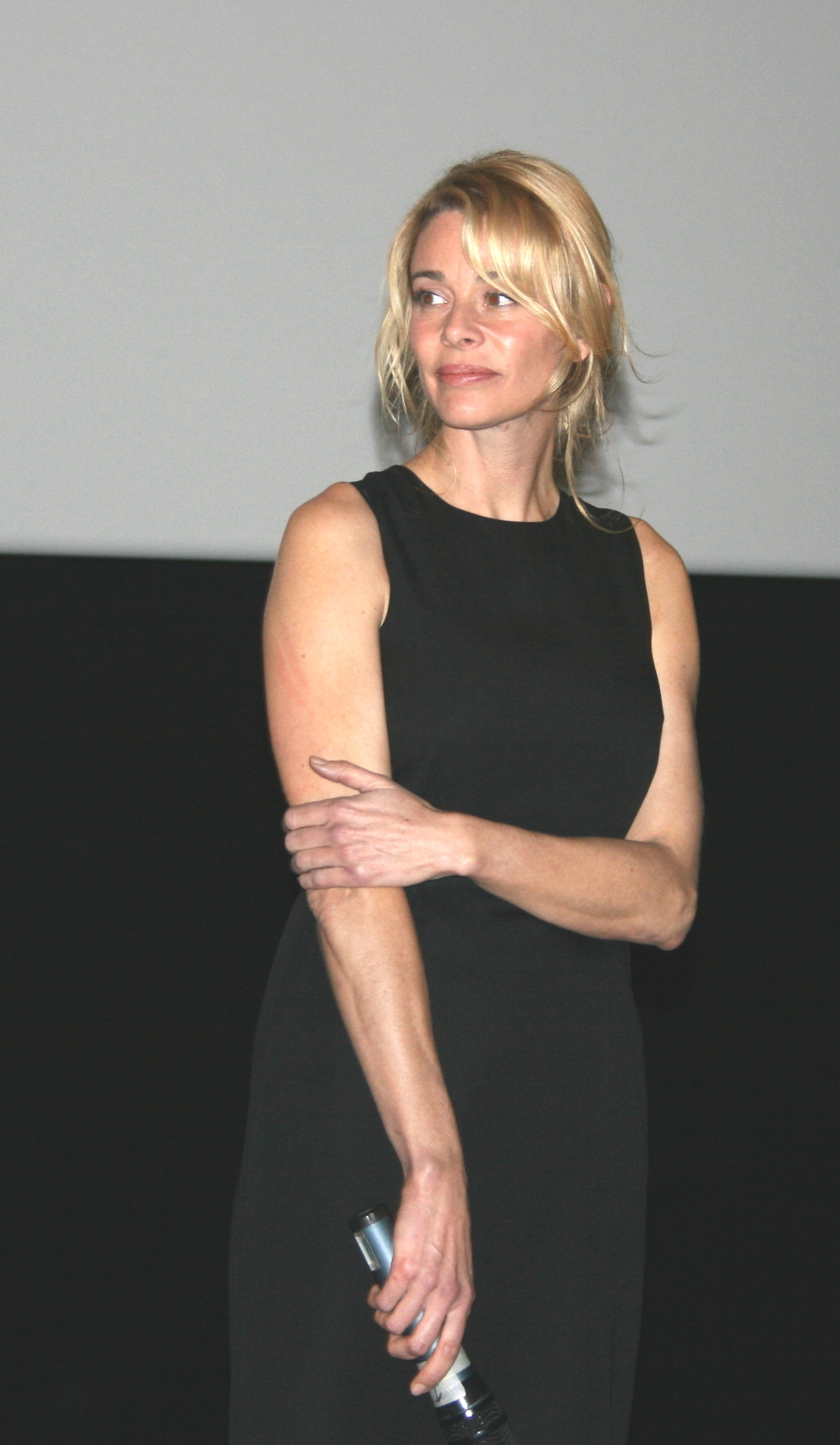
Rueda in 2008

María Belén Rueda García-Porrero (born 16 March 1965) is a Spanish actress. She garnered recognition in Spain for her performances in the Globomedia-produced television series Periodistas (1998–2002) and, most notably, Los Serrano (2003–2007). Likewise, she has carved an international reputation among horror fans for her performances in horror and suspense works.

== Early life ==
María Belén Rueda García-Porrero was born in Madrid on 16 March 1965. Her father was a civil engineer and her mother was a ballet instructor. She is the second of three children; her siblings are named María Jesús and Alfonso. She and her family moved to San Juan, Alicante when she was a child. When Rueda was 18 years old she moved to Madrid to study architecture.

== Career ==
While she was a student, she made her television debut as a steward in the night-show VIP Noche originally hosted by José Luis Moreno, eventually becoming the co-host together with Emilio Aragón.

While she had been already cast as the photographer Clara Nadal for the series Periodistas she was called to briefly play the same character of Clara Nadal in the popular dramedy Médico de familia (also produced by Globomedia) as a sort of emergency casting to cover a leave on absence, and thus the latter marked her debut as a television actress in 1997 (and both fictions became connected in the same fictional universe). She went then on to play the character of Clara Nadal in Periodistas from 1998 to 2002.

Starting in 2003 and over the course of six seasons and 107 episodes, Rueda performed the role of Lucía Gómez in the popular series Los Serrano, leaving the series in 2007 reportedly to focus on her stage career.

She landed her feature film debut with a performance in the 2004 film The Sea Inside, for which she won a Goya Award and an Actors Union Award as Best New Actress.

She received another Goya nomination for her role in the 2007 film, The Orphanage. Rueda played the lead role of the Spanish thriller Julia's Eyes, which was produced by Guillermo del Toro. She also starred in Oriol Paulo's thriller The Body.

== Filmography ==
=== Film ===
Year	Title	Role	Notes	Ref.
2004	Mar adentro (The Sea Inside)	Julia	Feature film debut	
2007	Savage Grace	Pilar Durán		
2007	El orfanato (The Orphanage)	Laura		
2008	8 citas (8 Dates)			
2009	Spanish Movie	Laura	Cameo	
2010	El mal ajeno (For the Good of Others)	Isabel		
2010	Los ojos de Julia (Julia's Eyes)	Julia		
2011	No tengas miedo (Don't Be Afraid)	Madre de Silvia ('Silvia's mother')		
2012	El cuerpo (The Body)	Mayka Villaverde		
2013	Séptimo (7th Floor)	Delia		
2013	Ismael	Nora		
2016	La noche que mi madre mató a mi padre (The Night My Mother Killed My Father)	Isabel París		
2017	Órbita 9 (Orbiter 9)	Silvia		
2017	Perfectos desconocidos (Perfect Strangers)	Eva		
2018	El cuaderno de Sara (Sara's Notebook)	Laura Alonso		
2018	El pacto (The Pact)	Mónica		
2018	No dormirás (You Shall Not Sleep)	Alma Böhm		
2019	El silencio de la ciudad blanca (Twin Murders: The Silence of the White City)	Alba Díaz de Salvatierra		
2023	Fenómenas (Phenomena)	Sagrario		
2023	La ermita (The Chapel)	Carol		
2024	Caída libre (Free Falling)	Marisol		
2025	Un funeral de locos	Edurne		
2026	El vestido (Evil Dress)	Alicia		

=== Television ===
Year	Title	Role	Notes	Ref.
1997	Médico de familia	Clara Nadal		
1998–2002	Periodistas	Clara Nadal		
2000	7 vidas	Ana Hacha		
2003–2007	Los Serrano	Lucía Gómez		
2010	La princesa de Éboli	Ana de Mendoza	Miniseries	
2011	El Barco	Leonor		
2012–2013	Luna, el misterio de Calenda	Sara Cruz		
2014–2015	B&b, de boca en boca	Candela Bermejo		
2020	Madres. Amor y vida	Marián Ballesteros		

== Awards and nominations ==
Award	Year	Category	Nominated work	Result
ACE Awards	2005	Best Actress	The Sea Inside	Nominated
ACE Awards	2008	Best Actress	The Orphanage	Won
Barcelona Film Awards	2007	Best Actress	The Orphanage	Won
Cinema Writers Circle Awards	2005	Best New Artist	The Sea Inside	Won
Cinema Writers Circle Awards	2008	Best Actress	The Orphanage	Nominated
European Film Awards	2008	Best Actress	The Orphanage	Nominated
Fantasporto Awards	2008	Best Actress	The Orphanage	Won
Fotogramas de Plata	2004	Best Television Actress	Los Serrano	Nominated
Fotogramas de Plata	2005	Best Film Actress	The Sea Inside	Won
Fotogramas de Plata	2008	Best Film Actress	The Orphanage	Nominated
Fotogramas de Plata	2011	Best Film Actress	Julia's Eyes	Nominated
Goya Awards	2004	Best New Actress	The Sea Inside	Won
Goya Awards	2007	Best Actress	The Orphanage	Nominated
Goya Awards	2010	Best Actress	Julia's Eyes	Nominated
Saturn Awards	2007	Best Actress	The Orphanage	Nominated
Actors and Actresses Union Awards	2005	Best Female Newcomer	The Sea Inside	Won
Actors and Actresses Union Awards	2006	Best Leading Female Performance	The Serranos	Nominated
Actors and Actresses Union Awards	2008	Best Female Leading Performance	The Orphanage	Nominated
TP de Oro	1994	Best Female Presenter	Ta tocao	Nominated
TP de Oro	2004	Best Actress	The Seranos	Nominated

== Personal life ==
During the time of VIP Noche she entered a relationship with producer Daniel Écija, with whom she had 3 daughters, including actress Belén Écija. After 14 years of domestic partnership, she got married with Écija in 2003. The couple separated a year later.

She later was in a relationship with Roger Vincent.
