= Todos mienten =

Television series

- Also known as: You Shall Not Lie
- Spanish: Todos mienten
- Genre: Thriller; Dark comedy; Satire
- Created by: Pau Freixas
- Written by: Pau Freixas; Iván Mercadé; Clara Esparrach; Eva Santolaria
- Directed by: Pau Freixas
- Starring: Irene Arcos; Natalia Verbeke; Leonardo Sbaraglia; Ernesto Alterio; Miren Ibarguren; Juan Diego Botto; Eva Santolaria; Amaia Salamanca; Jorge Bosch; Lucas Nabor; Carmen Arrufat; Berta Castañé; Marc Balaguer; Lu Colomina
- Country of origin: Spain
- Original language: Spanish
- No. of seasons: 2
- No. of episodes: 12

Production
- Production location: Catalonia
- Running time: c. 45 min
- Production companies: Movistar+; Filmax

Original release
- Network: Movistar+
- Release: 28 January 2022

You Shall Not Lie (Spanish: Todos mienten) is a Spanish television series with thriller, black humour and parodical elements created and directed by Pau Freixas and produced by Movistar+ in collaboration with Filmax. It features an ensemble cast that includes Irene Arcos, Amaia Salamanca, Natalia Verbeke, Miren Ibarguren, Leonardo Sbaraglia, Juan Diego Botto and Ernesto Alterio. It premiered on 28 January 2022.

== Premise ==
A video showing the sexual activities of a school teacher with one of her students (and son of her best friend) is made public, breaking up the tranquility in Belmonte, a fictional exclusive residential development in the Catalan coastline. To make things worse, a corpse belonging to one of the neighbors is discovered on a cliff.

== Cast ==
- Irene Arcos as Macarena.
- Natalia Verbeke as Ana.
- Leonardo Sbaraglia as Néstor.
- Ernesto Alterio as Diego.
- Miren Ibarguren as Maite.
- Juan Diego Botto as Sergio.
- Eva Santolaria as Yolanda.
- Amaia Salamanca as Sofía.
- Jorge Bosch as Arturo.
- Lucas Nabor as Iván.
- Carmen Arrufat as Natalia.
- Berta Castañé as Lucía.
- Marc Balaguer as Óscar.
- Lu Colomina as Iris.

== Production and release ==
Todos mienten was created by Pau Freixas, who also directed the episodes. Produced by Movistar+ in collaboration with Filmax, the series began filming on 5 October 2020. Production worked in locations across Barcelona, Girona and Tarragona. Consisting of 6 episodes featuring a running time of roughly 45 minutes, shooting wrapped by January 2021. The series was presented at the FesTVal in September 2021. It premiered on 28 January 2022.
