= To Die Is Not Always Good Business =

- Theatrical release poster
- Spanish: Morir no siempre sale bien
- Directed by: Claudia Pinto Emperador
- Screenplay by: Luis Moreno Sánchez; Claudia Pinto Emperador
- Produced by: Pedro Pastor; Gerardo Herrero; Mariela Besuievsky
- Starring: Tamara Casellas; Ana Wagener; Juan Carlos Vellido; Paula Muñoz; Raúl Prieto; Carmen Arrufat; Dani Pérez Prada; Pau Durà; Jorge Motos; Roberto Hoyo
- Cinematography: Aitor Echeverría
- Edited by: Mapa Pastor
- Music by: Vanessa Garde
- Production companies: Morir de película AIE; Voramar Films; Tornasol Media
- Distributed by: Karma Films
- Release dates: 23 April 2026 (BCN Film Fest); 26 June 2026 (Spain)
- Running time: 97 minutes
- Country: Spain
- Languages: Spanish; Catalan

To Die Is Not Always Good Business (Spanish: Morir no siempre sale bien) is a 2026 black comedy film directed by Claudia Pinto Emperador. The cast is led by Tamara Casellas and Ana Wagener. It features dialogue in Spanish and Valencian (Catalan).

== Plot ==
A lower-class family desecrates the tomb of a purportedly deceased businessman to ask for a ransom, although the body turns out to belong to another person, while the rich widow also has plans.

== Cast ==
- Tamara Casellas as Rosario
- Ana Wagener as Inés
- Juan Carlos Vellido as Ximo
- Paula Muñoz as Meli
- Raúl Prieto as Tomás
- Carmen Arrufat as Maribel
- Dani Pérez Prada as Rapino
- Pau Durà as Jesús
- Jorge Motos as Álvaro
- Roberto Hoyo as Christian

== Production ==
Luis Moreno developed the original story under the title El cadáver insaciable. The film was produced by Voramar Films, Tornasol Media, and Morir de Película AIE, with the participation of RTVE, Movistar Plus+, and À Punt Media. It was shot in Spanish and Valencian. Filming locations in the Valencia region included Tavernes de la Valldigna and Alfafar.

== Release ==
The film was presented in the 'Cinema amb gràcia' section of the 10th BCN Film Fest on 23 April 2026. Distributed by Karma Films, it was released theatrically in Spain on 26 June 2026.

== Reception ==
Philipp Engel of La Vanguardia rated the film 3 out of 5 stars ('good'), writing that, despite lacking aesthetic ambition, Pinto brings out the best of the cast of the black, social, and picaresque comedy, featuring a "well-oiled script", likening the film's premise to Rafael Azcona's and Mario Monicelli's films.

== Accolades ==
Year	Award	Category	Nominee(s)	Result	Ref.
2026	9th Lola Gaos Awards	Best Costume Design	Cristina Martín	Pending	

== See also ==
- List of Spanish films of 2026
