= Surviving the Cartel =

- Genre: Drama
- Created by: Ely Bams
- Showrunner: Ely Bams
- Starring: Alina Nastase, Gabriel Aguero, Dimas Gonzalez, Rey Cantu
- Music by: Jorge Daee Maland
- Country of origin: United States
- Original languages: English, Spanish
- No. of seasons: 2
- No. of episodes: 10

Production
- Executive producer: Ely Bams
- Producer: Jorge Alex Hernandez
- Running time: 50
- Production company: 1265 films

Original release
- Network: 1265 Films
- Release: 11 March 2022 – present

Surviving The Cartel is an American TV series starring Alina Nastase, Gabriel Aguero, Vanessa Restrepo, Rey Cantu, Dimas Gonzalez, Ryhon Thomas, Teresa Rabago, Gustavo Sanchez Parra and Jorge A Jimenez. The executive producer and creator is Ely Bams, and it was released on the streaming service 1265 Films.

Surviving the Cartel tells three interconnected histories of lust, power, family, migration and religion.

The premiere date was the 11 March 2022 in DF.

The Series have renewed for a second season and will premiere in December 2024 with the addition of Francisco Denis in the main cast.

== Plot ==
When a Silicon Valley CEO "Alejandro Cardona" decided to go back to Mexico to inherit a powerful Cartel from his father, it created a succession of events told in Surviving The Cartel.

== Cast ==
- Alina Nastase as Rachel parker
- Vamessa Restrepo as Marcelina Cordoba
- Gabriel Aguero as Alejandro Cardona
- Jorge Zarate as Juan Domingo
- Rey Cantu as Carlos Ortega
- Teresa Rabago as la madre
- Ryon Thomas as Taylor Parker
- Ramiro Blas as Rafael Badillo (Season 2)
- Francisco Denis as Sergio Olivero (Season 2)

== Episodes ==
The first season its composed of five episodes, a second season its order of the same name of chapters.

== Controversy ==
In March 2021 the SAG-AFTRA association notification to all the members of organization a recommendation of not be part of the show Surviving the Cartel denouncing the practice of hybrid casting when the guest role are decide by a vote system.

One of the producer of the show tell to variety that this polite of Online vote its not welcome to SAG. In the same time informed that the production company 1265 films LLC not signed the union contract and call to avoid working in this production.

The company accuse to SAG to have "Fear to the changes" and informed plans to hire union and nonunion actors for they productions.

== Filming locations ==
Surviving the cartel was shooting in several locations of Texas and city of Mexico in the summer of 2021.

== Critical reception ==
According to the Newspaper Digital Journal surviving the cartel have a score of 9.5 / 10 in the imdb platform among others.
