= Sara Vidorreta =

Spanish actress

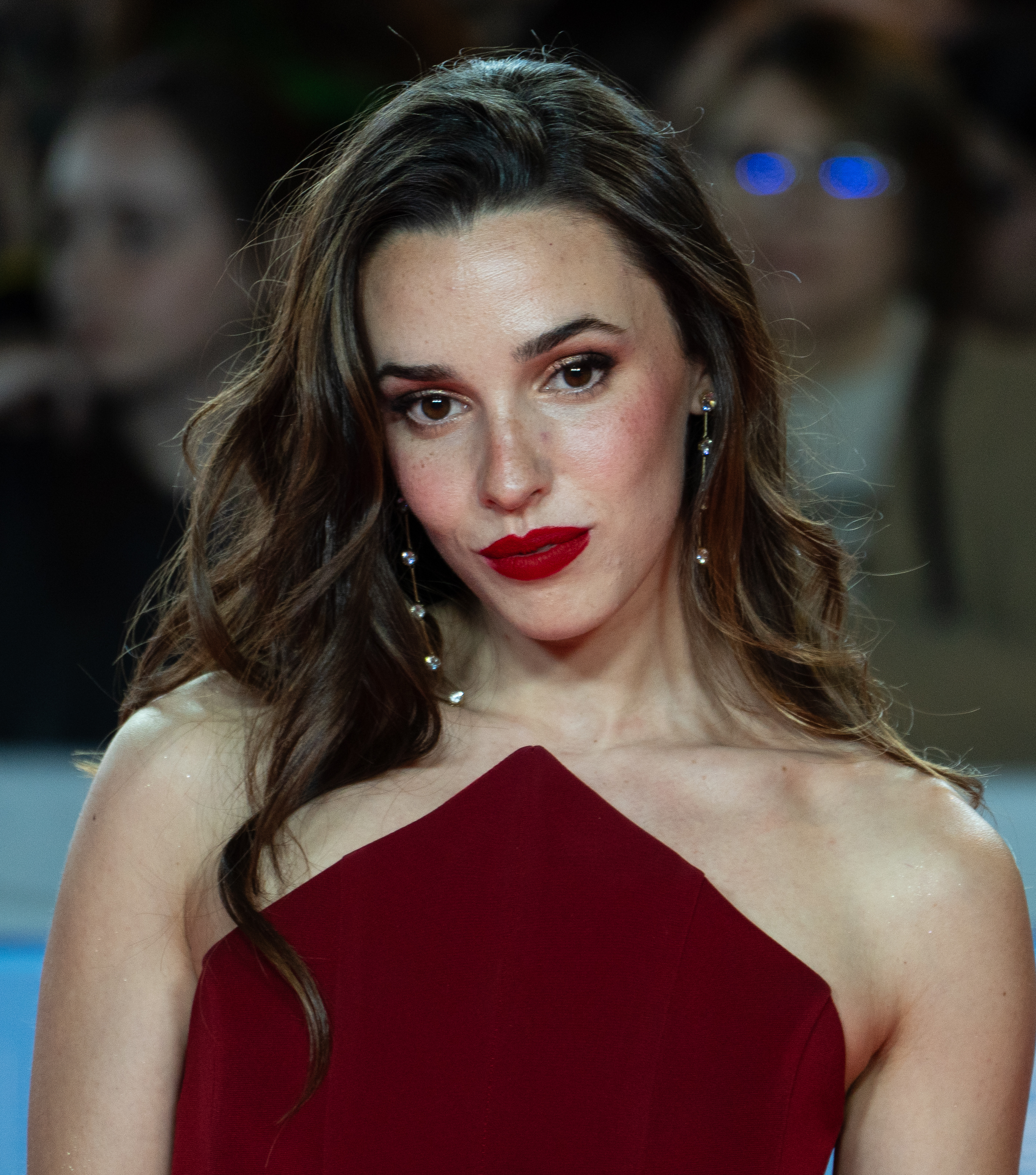
- Vidorreta in 2025
- Born: 18 June 1999 (age 26); Zaragoza, Spain
- Occupation: Actress
- Years active: 2016–present

Sara Vidorreta (born 18 June 1999) is a Spanish actress, known, among other things, for starring in the television series Amar es para siempre among other television series.

== Biography ==
She was born in 1999 in Zaragoza, Spain, and at the age of eighteen she moved to Madrid to pursue her acting career.

She began her career with roles in the series Vis a Vis and the Telecinco series El padre de Caín and Lo que escondían sus ojos.

In 2018, she joined the cast of the second season of the series La Reina del Sur with her role as Rocío Aljarafe, whose grandmother in the fiction is played by Luisa Gavasa, also from Zaragoza.

In 2019, she participated in Servir y proteger and starred in Telecinco's Secretos de Estado. In 2020, she appeared in the ninth season of Antena 3's daily series Amar es para siempre, playing Emma Sáez Abascal, as well as the Amazon Prime Video series El Cid.

In September 2021 she left the series Amar es para siempre to star in the TV miniseries The Time It Takes.

== Filmography ==
Year	Series	Role	Channel	Duration
2016	Vis a vis	Amaia Jiménez	Antena 3	9 episodes
2016	El padre de Caín		Telecinco	1 episode
2016	Lo que escondían sus ojos	Hija de Sonsoles	Telecinco	1 episode
2017	IFamily	Laura Molina	La 1	8 episodes
2019	Servir y proteger	Margarita "Marga" Pérez	La 1	44 episodes
2019	Secretos de Estado	Laura Guzmán Chantalle	Telecinco	13 episodes
(2019),(2022)	La reina del sur	Rocío Aljarafe	Telemundo	53 episodes
2020–2021	Amar es para siempre	Emma Sáez de Abascal	Antena 3	251 episodes
2020	El Cid	Ermersinda	Prime Video	5 episodes
2021	The Time It Takes	Ariadna Castro	Netflix	1 episode
2024	Segunda muerte	Alisa Cobián	Movistar Plus+	6 episodes
2024	4 estrellas	Nuria Ibáñez	Televisión Española	28 episodes
2025	Enemies	Raquel	—	—
2025	Graduation Trip: Mallorca	Nicky	—	—
