= Between Lands =

Spanish melodrama television series

- Spanish: Entre tierras
- Genre: Melodrama
- Based on: La sposa
- Written by: Susana López Rubio; Juan Beiro; Joaquín Santamaría
- Directed by: Pablo Guerrero; Humberto Miró; María Togores
- Starring: Megan Montaner; Unax Ugalde; Juanjo Puigcorbé; Carlos Serrano; Begoña Maestre
- Country of origin: Spain
- Original language: Spanish
- No. of seasons: 2
- No. of episodes: 20

Production
- Production companies: Atresmedia TV; Boomerang TV

Original release
- Network: Atresplayer
- Release: 10 September 2023 – 17 May 2026

Between Lands (Spanish: Entre tierras) is a Spanish melodrama television series which stars Megan Montaner. It was originally released on Atresplayer in 2023.

In February 2025, the series was renewed for a second season. The second season was broadcast between March and May 2026.

== Plot ==
Set in 1960s Spain, the plot tracks the vicissitudes of María Rodríguez, from the village of Almadrava de Monteleva, in the province of Almería. María does not wait for the return of her boyfriend, an economic emigrant to Germany, and engages by proxy, via an elder landowner from La Mancha, Don Ramón Cervantes, to the latter's nephew Manuel, so María's younger sister Luisa can have a brighter future.

== Cast ==
- Megan Montaner as María Rodríguez
- Juanjo Puigcorbé as Ramón Cervantes
- Unax Ugalde as Manuel
- Carlos Serrano as José Aguilar
- Clara Garrido as Claudia Barea
- Llorenç González as Gabriel Expósito
- Begoña Maestre as Justa Martínez
- Inma Pérez-Quirós as Sagrario
- Magdalena Tejado as Luisa
- Belén Écija as Llanos Herrero
- Marc Parejo as Alonso Herrero
- José Sospedra as Jorge Orduño
- Mateo Medina as Guillermo
- Inma Cuevas as Pepita Trocal

== Production ==
Based on Italian miniseries La sposa, the series was written by Susana López Rubio, Juan Beiro and Joaquín Santamaría and directed by Humberto Miró, María Togores, and Pablo Guerrero. It was produced by Atresmedia TV in collaboration with Boomerang TV.

== Release ==
The series was presented at the FesTVal on 8 September 2023. It debuted on Atresplayer on 10 September 2023. The original broadcasting run ended on 10 November 2023. It was later broadcast on free-to-air Antena 3.
