= Olivia Molina (actress) =

Spanish actress

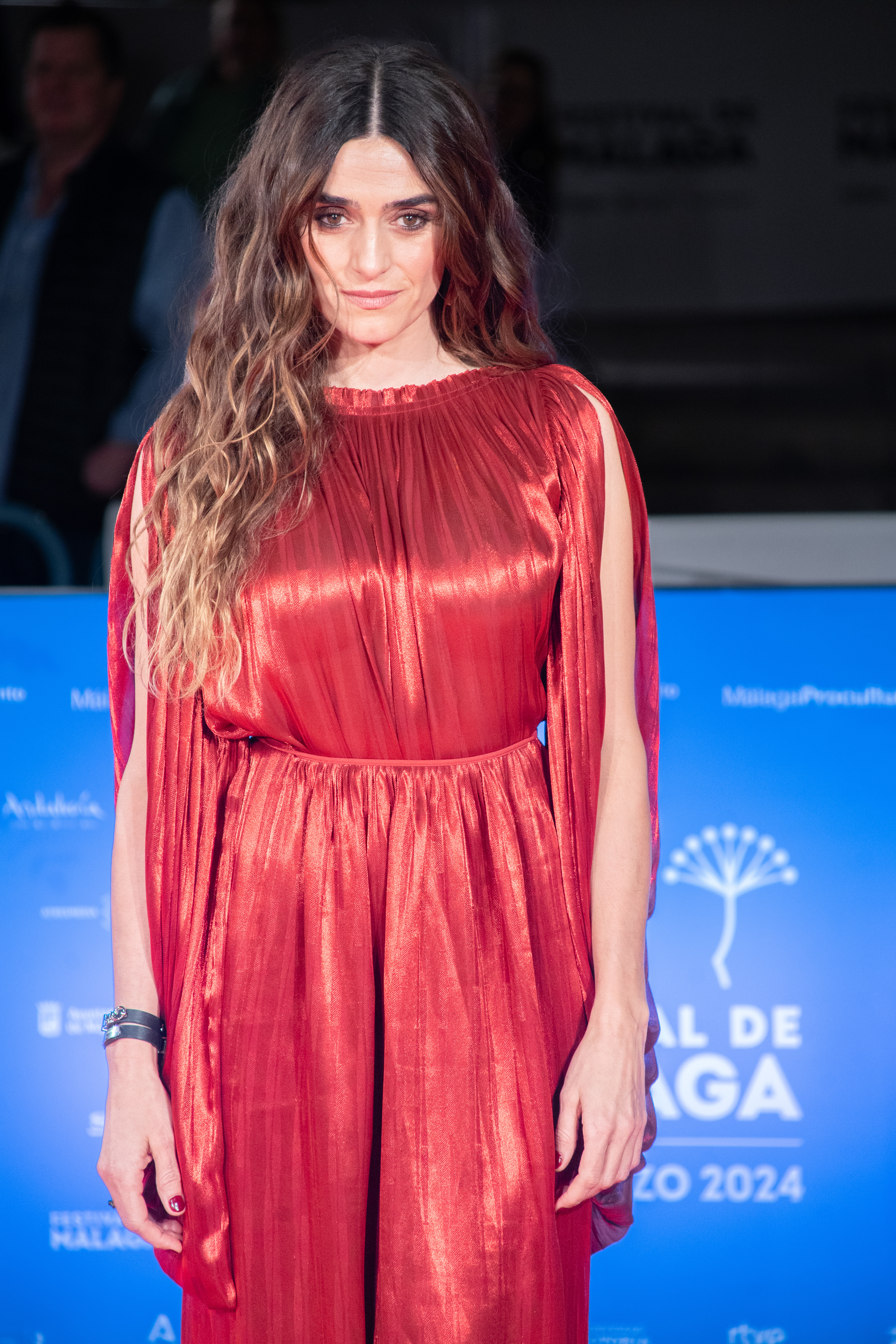
- Molina in 2024
- Born: Olivia Tirmarche Molina; 25 September 1980 (age 45); Ibiza, Spain
- Occupation: Actress
- Years active: 2000–present
- Partner: Sergio Mur
- Children: 2
- Mother: Ángela Molina
- Relatives: Antonio Molina (grandfather); Mónica Molina (aunt)

Olivia Tirmarche Molina (born 25 September 1980) is a Spanish actress.

== Biography ==
Olivia Tirmarche Molina was born on 25 September 1980 in Ibiza, Balearic Islands. She is the daughter of Spanish actress Ángela Molina and French photographer Hervé Tirmarche. She is the oldest of six siblings. Her mother's family is an entertainment dynasty. She is the niece of actors Paula, Miguel, Mónica, and Noel Molina and the granddaughter of singer Antonio Molina.

== Personal life ==
Molina has two children with actor Sergio Mur. The two met in 2010 on the set of Fisica o Quimica.

== Career ==
=== Film ===
Film	Director	Year
Mediterranean Food	Joaquín Oristrell	2009
Yo soy sola	Tatiana Mereñuk	2008
School Killer	Carlos Gil	2001
Jara	Manuel Estudillo	2000

=== Television ===
Series	Character	Year
The Best Heart Attack of My Life	Concha	2025
La Valla (The Barrier)	Julia	2020
Luna, el misterio de Calenda	Olivia	2012–2013
Física o Química	Verónica	2010–2011
Un burka por amor	María	2009
El síndrome de Ulises	Reyes	2007–2008
A tortas con la vida	Mónica	2005–2006
Al salir de clase	Nadine	2000–2002

=== Theater ===
- Un enemigo del pueblo (2007)
- De repente, el último verano (2006)
- El Graduado (2005)
- El adefesio (2003)
- Fashion feeling music (2001)
- La casa de Bernarda Alba (2000)
