= Madres. Amor y vida =

- Genre: Medical drama; Family drama
- Created by: Aitor Gabilondo; Joan Barbero
- Starring: Belén Rueda; Carla Díaz; Aida Folch; Carmen Ruiz; Rosario Pardo
- Country of origin: Spain
- Original language: Spanish
- No. of seasons: 4
- No. of episodes: 42

Production
- Production companies: Mediaset España; Alea Media

Original release
- Network: Amazon Prime Video
- Release: 8 May 2020

Madres. Amor y vida is a Spanish medical drama television series created by Aitor Gabilondo and Joan Barbero. Produced by Mediaset España in collaboration with Alea Media, it premiered in 2020 on Amazon Prime Video.

== Premise ==
The series follows a group of women with something in common: their children are hospitalized.

== Cast ==
- Belén Rueda as Marián Ballesteros.
- Vicky Luengo as Natalia.
- Aida Folch as Olivia.
- Rosario Pardo as Mila.
- Carmen Ruiz as Luisa.
- Carla Díaz as Elsa.
- Antonio Molero as Antonio.
- Joel Bosqued as Andy.
- Nacho Fresneda as Chema.
- Mónica Cruz as Carmen.
- María de Nati
- Ana Labordeta as Vicky.

Introduced in season 2

- Jon Plazaola as Eduardo.
- Elena Irureta as Eva.
- Paco Tous as Gonzalo.
- Jesús Castro as Charlie.
- Irene Arcos as Claudia.

Introduced in season 3

- Hiba Abouk as Raquel.
- Michelle Calvó as Camila.
- Carlos Bardem as Héctor.
- Adrià Collado as Doctor Carlos Matute.
- Ben Temple as Lorenzo.
- Lucía Jiménez.
- Eva Llorach.
- Uri Guitart as Rubén.
- Carlos Serrano.
- Esther Ortega.
- Unai Mayo.
- Tomás del Estal.
- María Mercado.
- Arlette Torres
- Álvaro Larrán.

Introduced in season 4

- Nuria Herrero as Berta
- Belén Écija as Almu
- Júlia Molins as Sandra
- Eric Masip as Mikel
- Jordi Coll as Luigi
- Álvaro Rico as Gabriel
- Nuria Roca as Blanca Robledo

== Production and release ==
Created by Aitor Gabilondo and Joan Barbero, Madres. Amor y vida is produced by Mediaset España in collaboration with Alea Media. Mediterráneo Mediaset España is the series' distributor. The 26 episodes corresponding to the first and second season were shot in Madrid. Consisting of 13 episodes, the first season premiered on Amazon Prime Video on 8 May 2020.

The first season of the series premiered on 9 September 2020 on Telecinco. The second season was released on Amazon Prime Video on 13 November 2020. Despite the bad viewership ratings of the first season's free-to-air broadcasting run on Telecinco (which forced the channel to bring forward the finale in order to make room for new programming leaving 5 unaired episodes), Mediaset España renovated the series for a third season, also ordering the creators to work in a potential fourth season, conceived as a sort of spin-off.

Featuring 8 episodes, season 3 premiered on Amazon Prime Video on 23 September 2021.

NBCUniversal Telemundo Enterprises and Mediterráneo Mediaset España Group struck a distribution agreement so the series could stream on the Peacock's SVOD tier starting in late 2022.

Season 4 premiered on 8 April 2022.

| Series | Episodes | Originally released | Network |
|---|---|---|---|
| 1 | 13 | 8 May 2020 | Amazon Prime Video |
| 2 | 13 | 13 November 2020 | Amazon Prime Video |
| 3 | 8 | 23 September 2021 | Amazon Prime Video |
| 4 | 8 | 8 April 2022 | Amazon Prime Video |

== Awards and nominations ==
| Year | Award | Category | Nominee(s) | Result | Ref. |
|---|---|---|---|---|---|
| 2021 | 8th MiM Series Awards | Best Drama Actress | Belén Rueda | Nominated | |
| 2022 | 30th Actors and Actresses Union Awards | Best Television Actress in a Secondary Role | Ana Labordeta | Won | |
