= The Time It Takes (TV series) =

Spanish television series

- Genre: Romantic drama
- Created by: Nadia de Santiago
- Written by: Pablo Fernández; Inés Pintor Sierra; Pablo Santidrián
- Directed by: Inés Pintor Sierra; Pablo Santidrián
- Starring: Nadia de Santiago; Álvaro Cervantes
- Country of origin: Spain
- Original language: Spanish
- No. of seasons: 1
- No. of episodes: 10

Production
- Cinematography: Alberto Pareja
- Running time: 11 minutes
- Production companies: Corte y Confección de Películas; Netflix España

Original release
- Network: Netflix
- Release: 29 October 2021

The Time It Takes (Spanish: El tiempo que te doy) is a 2021 Spanish television series created for Netflix, starring Nadia de Santiago and Álvaro Cervantes. De Santiago also created the series. The show explores a unique narrative format, consisting of ten episodes, each approximately 11 minutes long.

== Synopsis ==
Lina (Nadia de Santiago) is starting over: she moves to a new home, looks for a new job, and tries new experiences. But what she is really trying to do is forget a past love—her first love. Each day, Lina tries to spend one minute less thinking about Nico (Álvaro Cervantes) in order to move forward with her life.

== Cast ==
=== Main ===
- Nadia de Santiago as Lina Ruiz
- Álvaro Cervantes as Nicolás "Nico" Torres

=== Recurring ===
- David Castillo as Santi
- Mariví Carrillo as Mavi
- Cala Zavaleta as Inés
- Carla Linares as Laura
- Luisa Vides as Doctor
- Eloi Costa as Nicolás
- Violeta Mateos as Mireia
- Prince Ezeanyim as Pedro
- Dariam Coco as Clara
- Marcelo Carvajal as Jon
- Stephan Eitner as Víctor
- Sara Vidorreta as Ariadna Castro
- Moussa Echarif as Samir
- Ramón Rados as Vicente
- Nico Romero as Julio
- Julián Villagrán as Richi
- Denis Gómez as Luis Miguel
- Blanca Parés as Mar
- África de la Cruz as Sol
- Isabel Ampudia as Doctor
- Inma Cuevas as Elvira

== Production ==
In October 2020, Netflix announced its lineup of original Spanish projects for the upcoming season, with The Time It Takes being one of them. The series explores a different creative format, with each episode lasting 11 minutes. Filming took place in Madrid and Andalusia. In July 2021, the release date was announced for October of the same year.

== Episodes ==
No.	Title	Directed by	Written by	Original release date
1	"1 minuto de presente y 10 minutos de recuerdo"	Inés Pintor, Pablo Santidrián	Nadia de Santiago, Inés Pintor, Pablo Santidrián	October 29, 2021
2	"2 minutos de presente y 9 minutos de recuerdo"	Inés Pintor, Pablo Santidrián	Nadia de Santiago, Inés Pintor, Pablo Santidrián	October 29, 2021
3	"3 minutos de presente y 8 minutos de recuerdo"	Inés Pintor, Pablo Santidrián	Nadia de Santiago, Inés Pintor, Pablo Santidrián	October 29, 2021
4	"4 minutos de presente y 7 minutos de recuerdo"	Inés Pintor, Pablo Santidrián	Nadia de Santiago, Inés Pintor, Pablo Santidrián	October 29, 2021
5	"5 minutos de presente y 6 minutos de recuerdo"	Inés Pintor, Pablo Santidrián	Nadia de Santiago, Inés Pintor, Pablo Santidrián	October 29, 2021
6	"6 minutos de presente y 5 minutos de recuerdo"	Inés Pintor, Pablo Santidrián	Nadia de Santiago, Inés Pintor, Pablo Santidrián	October 29, 2021
7	"7 minutos de presente y 4 minutos de recuerdo"	Inés Pintor, Pablo Santidrián	Nadia de Santiago, Inés Pintor, Pablo Santidrián	October 29, 2021
8	"8 minutos de presente y 3 minutos de recuerdo"	Inés Pintor, Pablo Santidrián	Nadia de Santiago, Inés Pintor, Pablo Santidrián	October 29, 2021
9	"9 minutos de presente y 2 minutos de recuerdo"	Inés Pintor, Pablo Santidrián	Nadia de Santiago, Inés Pintor, Pablo Santidrián	October 29, 2021
10	"10 minutos de presente y 1 minuto de recuerdo"	Inés Pintor, Pablo Santidrián	Nadia de Santiago, Inés Pintor, Pablo Santidrián	October 29, 2021

== Accolades ==
=== Feroz Awards ===
Year	Category	Nominee(s)	Result	Ref.
2022	Best Drama Series	El tiempo que te doy	Nominated	
2022	Best Actress in a Television Series	Nadia de Santiago	Nominated	
2022	Best Actor in a Television Series	Álvaro Cervantes	Nominated	

=== Forqué Awards ===
Year	Category	Nominee(s)	Result	Ref.
2022	Best Female Performance in a Television Series	Nadia de Santiago	Nominated	
