= 11-M, para que nadie lo olvide =

- Genre: Mini-series
- Directed by: Daniel Cebrián
- Starring: Zoe Berriatúa; Paco Manzanedo; Kaabil S. Ettaquil, Abdelatif Hwidar
- Country of origin: Spain
- Original language: Spanish
- No. of episodes: 2

Production
- Running time: 160 minutes (Total)

Original release
- Network: Telecinco
- Release: July 4 – July 6, 2011

11-M, para que nadie lo olvide (English: 11-M, never forget) was a Spanish TV mini-series which was aired in Telecinco in 2011. Two episodes were broadcast.

The mini-series narrates how the 2004 Madrid train bombings were planned and unfolded.

== Cast ==
- Abdelatif Hwidar
- Zoe Berriatúa
- Paco Manzanedo
- Kaabil S. Ettaquil
- Alil El Aziz
- Irene Arcos
- Monica Rodríguez Caballero
- Marta Codina
- Younes Bachir
