= Fundación José María Castañé =

The José María Castañé Foundation (Fundación José María Castañé) is a Spanish cultural private institution dedicated to historic documents and research. It was founded in 2004 by José María Castañé, a Spanish entrepreneur.

== Declaration and principles ==
- To preserve, restore, classify and catalogue its own documents
- To deepen knowledge about the 20th century through its collections
- To exhibit, project and expand its collections

== Archive ==
In 2016 the Foundation donated part of its archive to the University of Harvard
