= Alina Nastase =

Romanian-Spanish actress, singer and model (born 1990)

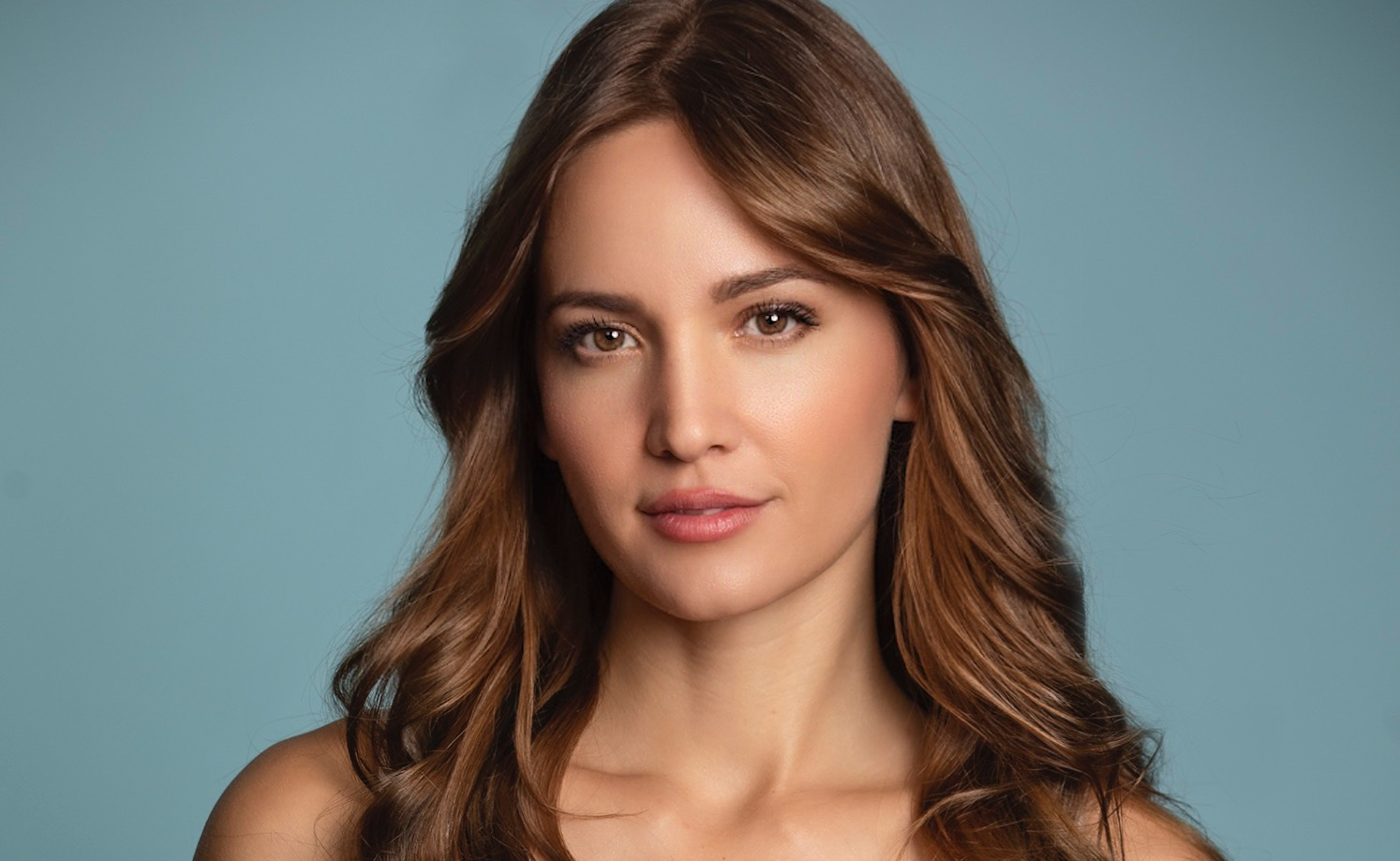
- Born: 19 March 1990 (age 36); Bucharest, Romania
- Citizenship: Spaniard
- Occupations: Actress, model, producer.
- Years active: 2012–present
- Notable work: The Key Game, Surviving The Cartel
- Website: https://alinanastase.com/

Alina Nastase (also Năstase /nəsˈtɑːzeɪ/, Romanian: [nəsˈtase]; born 19 March 1990) is a Romanian-Spanish actress, model, director and producer. She is known for her participation in the films Vigilo El Camino, The key Game and the TV series Surviving The Cartel and The Barrier.

== Childhood ==
Nastase was born in Bucharest and studied at the Waldon School of Arts. Her first dream was to become a painter.

== Career ==
Nastase relocated with her family to Zaragoza at the age of 14.

Nastase's first movie was Side B. The following year, she starred in Vigilo el Camino, a thriller about a satanic cult leader directed by Pablo Aragües. Her next role was in the 2015 remake of Vampyre, directed by Víctor Matellano.

In 2016, she starred in the film A Stroke of Luck and appeared in an episode of Acacias 38. The following year, she featured in the short films Pasarea (2018) and Hermana (2020).

In 2020, she played the role of a spy in Antena 3's The Barrier, which later premiered internationally on Netflix in September 2020. She also had a recurring role as Susy in the TV series Desaparecidos and a supporting role in the film The Life Was That, alongside Petra Martínez, Ana Castillo, and Ramón Barea.

In 2022, she played the role of Natasha in the film The Key Game, alongside actors such as Tamar Novas and Belén Cuesta. That same year, she made her American television debut as the lead actress in the series Surviving the Cartel, portraying Rachel Parker. In 2024, she made a guest appearance in the Netflix production Alpha Males.

== Films ==
Movie	Character	Director	Year
Villa Hollywood	Rhonda	Dylan Mooney	TBA
Last Ride	Gabrielle	Nyle Cavazos Garcia	2023
The key Game	Natasha	Vicente Villanuevaa	2022
Two Bombshell And a Body	Martina	Steve Sturla	2021
The Life was That	Cristina	David Martin De Los Santos	2020
Hermana	Marga	Mikaela Bruce	2020
Adios Susana	Boss	Chando Luna	2020
Pasarea	Vera	Mikaela Bruce	2018
A Stroke of Luck	Simona	Nacho G Velilla	2016
Muchos Pedazos De Algo	Noemi	David Yañez	2015
Vampyres	Ann	Victor Matellano	2015
Sensaciones	Chica Maniqui	Hector Sanfer	2015
Vigilo El Camino	Ana	Pablo Aragues	2013
Side B	Mioara	David Yañez	2012

== TV ==
Series	Character	Network	Year
Alpha of my Hearth	Deliah	Kalos Tv	2025
Alpha Males	Lucia	Netflix	2024
Surviving The Cartel	Rachael Parker	1265 / Amazon	2022–present
The Barrier	Chica espia	Netflix/ Antena 3	2020
Desaparecidos	Susy	Amazon prime Video	2020
Estoy Vivo	Police woman	Telecinco	2019
Esclavas	TBA	Telecinco	2016
Ajuste De Cuesta	Bonnie	YouTube	2016-2019
Acacias 38	Daria	Telecinco	2016

== Theater ==
Play	Character	Director	Year
Back Stage	Cali	Jose Luis Saiz	2016
Chorus Line	-	Lola Gonzalez & Bob Nico	2014

== Awards ==
- Best Winer Actress In The Studio Film Festival ( 2020)
- Nominated to Best Supporting Actress to Goya Prize ( 2016)

== Official Site ==
- https://alinanastase.com/
- https://www.instagram.com/alinanastase_official_/reels/?hl=es-la
- https://www.facebook.com/alinanastasee
