= Berta Castañé =

Catalan actress and model (born 2002)

- Born: Berta Castañé García; 5 November 2002 (age 23); Sabadell, Catalonia, Spain
- Occupations: Actor and model
- Years active: 2013–present
- Height: 1.60 m (5 ft 2.99 in)
- Parents: Juan Carlos Castañé (father); Nuria García (mother)
- Relatives: Carla Castañé (sister); Joan Castañé (brother)

Berta Castañé García (born 5 November 2002 in Sabadell) is a Spanish actor and model known for her participation as Nuria Vega Valverde in the series Bajo sospecha (2015) and Carolina Solozábal in the series El secreto de Puente Viejo (2019–2020), both on Antena 3.

== Biography ==
Berta Castañé was born on 5 November 2002, in Sabadell, in the Spanish province of Barcelona.

== Career ==
Berta Castañé started in 2013 as a child model for Les enfants de l'eden. Later, she made her debut on television playing a leading role in the Antena 3 series Under suspicion, as Nuria Vega Valverde, a girl who disappears on the day of her communion and which gives rise to the events of the series. Later, she participated in the telefilms La Española inglesa and Laia. She has also been an ambassador for the firm Hortensia Maeso Girls and, among others, has starred in the campaign The Sweet Escape.

In 2016 she made her film debut with the film directed by Ventura Pons Oh, quina Joia!. That same year she starred in the series Big Band Clan, on the children's network Clan TV on Spanish Television, with the role of Ana. In 2017 she began to play Julia in the Catalan television series Com si fos ahir and, later, She returned to participate in a Ventura Pons film, Miss Dalí (2018), about the story of Salvador Dalí. In 2019 she was one of the protagonists of the Netflix original miniseries Días de Navidad, playing the character of Esther, who in Adulthood played Elena Anaya.

In 2019 she began to play the role of Carolina Solozábal in the Antena 3 daily series El secreto de Puente Viejo. In 2020, she played the role of Sol in the series The Barrier (La valla). Nello stesso anno has played the role of Girl in the short film Mil battles.

In January 2022 she played the role of Lucía in the Movistar Plus+ Todos mienten series, directed by Pau Freixas. In January of the same year he took part in the Feroz Awards for the Todos mienten series. Also in 2022 she played the role of Gaby in the Netflix series Welcome to Eden (Bienvenidos a Edén), participation already announced in 2021. She starred in the Heridas series that same year. In 2026, she appeared as Maca in the Netflix series Oasis, playing the role of a spoiled young woman involved in a thriller disappearance.

== Filmografía ==
=== Film ===
Year	Title	Role	Director
2016	Oh, quina joia!	Aina	Ventura Pons
2018	Miss Dalí	Anna María	Ventura Pons

=== TV series ===
Year	Title	Role	Canal	Notes
2015	Bajo sospecha	Nuria Vega Valverde	Antena 3	8 episodes
2015	La española inglesa	Tamsi	TVE	Telefilme
2016	Laia	Laia (niña)	TV3	Telefilme
2016–2017	Big Band Clan	Ana	Clan TV	26 episodes
2017–2022	Com si fos ahir	Julia	TV3	41 episodes
2019	Días de Navidad	Esther	Netflix	2 episodes
2019–2020	El secreto de Puente Viejo	Carolina Solozábal	Antena 3	164 episodes
2020	The Barrier (La valla)	Sol	Antena 3	2 episodes
2022	Todos mienten	Lucía	Movistar Plus+	6 episodes
2022	Heridas		Antena 3	2 episodios
2022	Heridas		Atresplayer Premium	2 episodios
2022–2023	Welcome to Eden (Bienvenidos a Edén)	Gabi	Netflix	16 episodes
2026	Oasis	Maca	Netflix	8 episodes

=== Short films ===
Year	Title	Rol	Director
2020	Mil Batalles	Girl	Dani Feixas Roka
