= Amelia Tiganus =

Romanian-Spanish women's rights activist, writer, and anti-trafficking campaigner

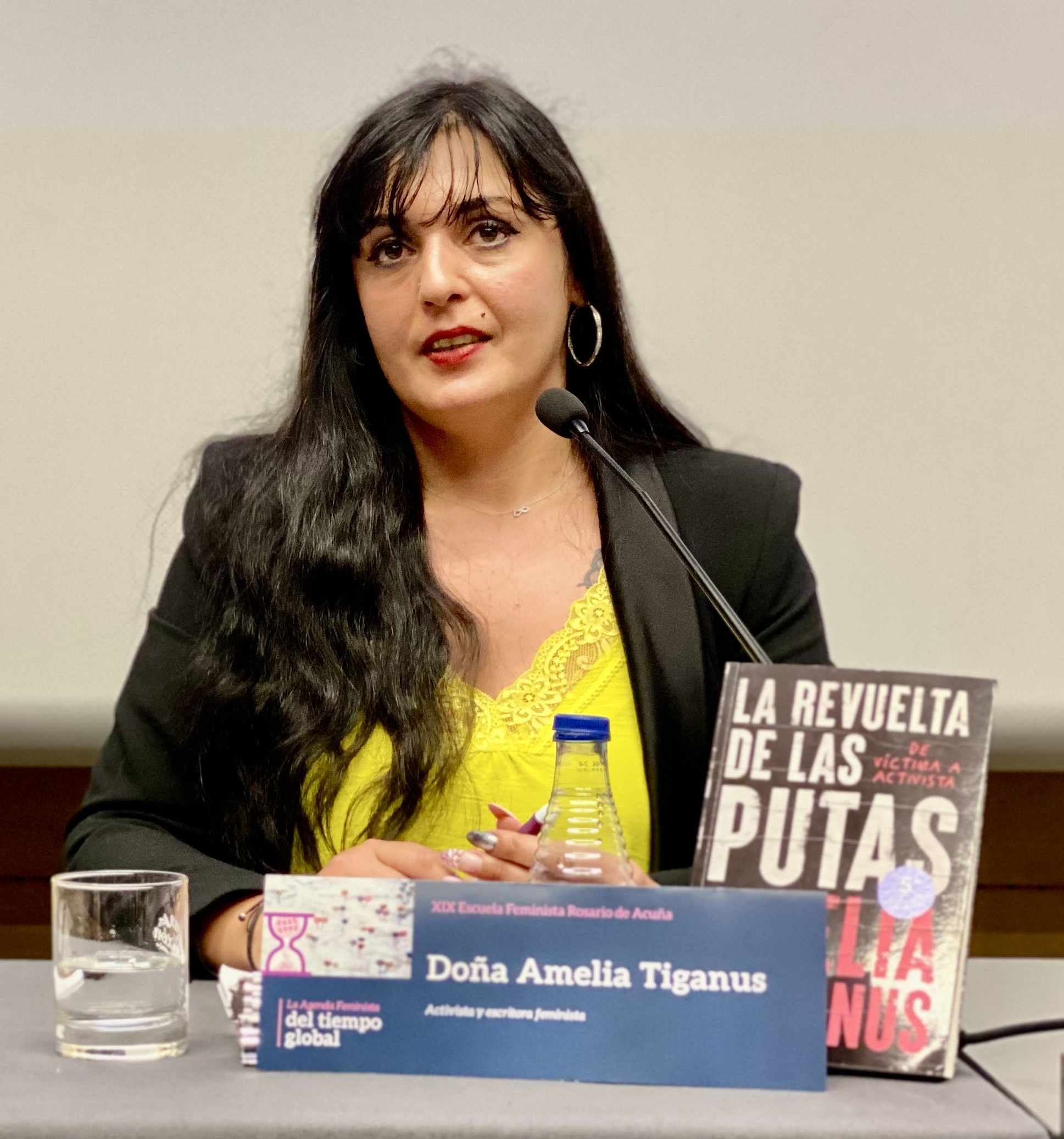
- Amelia Tiganus at Intervención en la Escuela Feminista Rosario Acuña, 2022
- Born: 1984 (age 41–42); Galați, Romania
- Occupations: Activist, writer, educator
- Known for: Anti-trafficking activism, feminist advocacy, author of La revuelta de las putas

Amelia Tiganus (born 1984) is a Romanian-born Spanish feminist activist, writer, and educator known for her work against sex trafficking and sexual exploitation. A survivor of trafficking and prostitution, she is one of Spain's most prominent voices for the abolition of the sex trade and for women's rights.

== Early life ==
Tiganus grew up in Galați, eastern Romania. At age 13, she was gang-raped by local boys in her neighborhood, a trauma that led to isolation and the end of her school education. At 17, she was sold by a Romanian acquaintance to a trafficking network for 300 euros and taken to Spain under false pretenses.

== Exploitation and survival ==
Upon arrival in Spain, Tiganus was forced into prostitution, circulating through more than forty brothels over five years. She describes the system as one of psychological and physical control, with pimps using threats and violence to maintain dominance over women. Despite the appearance of "freedom", she and other women were subjected to long shifts, constant surveillance, and debt bondage. Eventually, Tiganus was able to escape, though she faced significant barriers to rebuilding her life.

== Activism and writing ==
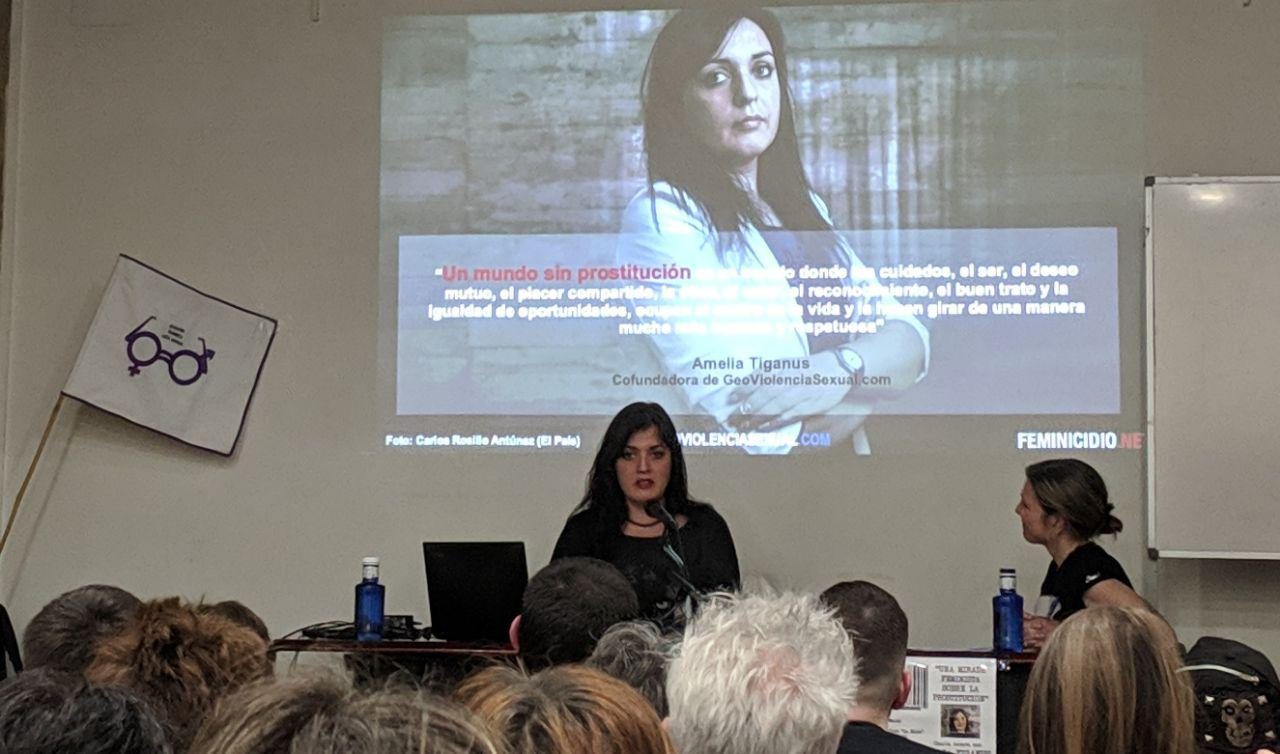
Amelia Tiganus at a talk organized by the Gafas Moradas association.

After leaving prostitution, Tiganus became an outspoken critic of the sex trade, and a leading abolitionist activist in Spain. She has coordinated training and prevention projects at Feminicidio.net, and has delivered hundreds of lectures, workshops, and conferences throughout Spain, Latin America, and Europe.

Her memoir, La revuelta de las putas ("The Revolt of the Whores", 2021), is a powerful account of her experience with trafficking and sexual exploitation, as well as a call for a prostitution-free society. In her work, Tiganus emphasizes the importance of understanding prostitution as a form of violence against women, and highlights the need for social and legal change.

== Recognition and impact ==
Tiganus has received multiple awards for her activism, including the 2019 "Recognition of the commitment shown to achieve a society free of violence against women" from Spain's Ministry of Equality and the Government of Spain. She is a member of the Abolitionist Movement of the Basque Country (EHMA), founder of the association Emargi, and co-founder of the International Abolitionist School.

== See also ==
- Migrant sex work
- Forced prostitution
- Exploitation of labour
- People smuggling
- Transnational efforts to prevent human trafficking
