= Virgil Popa =

Romanian-born Spanish conductor (born 1975)

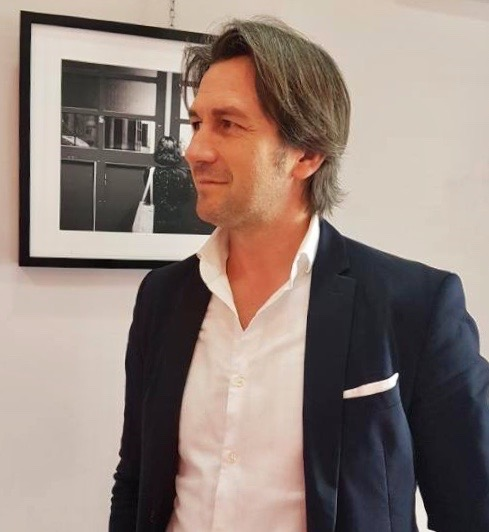
- Popa in May 2018.

Virgil Popa (born 8 October 1975) is a Romanian-born Spanish conductor. He is the founder and director of the International Orchestra of Madrid. His repertoire includes great works of classical and contemporary music. Currently he is the in-house conductor of the Stradivari Symphony Orchestra.

Virgil Popa was born in Roma, Romania within a family of amateur musicians. From his older brother he received his first musical notions and began playing the piano at an early age. At fourteen he began studying double-bass at the Institute of Arts Stefan Luchian of Botoșani, which had just reopened after the fall of the dictatorship. In this important center he received lessons, among others, from the renowned pedagogue Gigel Sobachi. He continued his studies of the double-bass in the George Enescu University of Arts of Iași and in 1999 he was graduated in Music with the specialty in double-bass.

Virgil Popa studied conducting with teachers like Jorma Panula, Konrad von Abel and Enrique García Asensio, learning from the last two, Musical Phenomenology and the conducting technique of Sergiu Celibidache. In 2005 he founded the International Orchestra of Madrid and performed acclaimed concerts in major concert halls throughout Spain.
