= Carla Castañé =

Spanish actress and model

- Born: Carla Castañé García; June 1, 2005 (age 20); Sabadell, Catalonia, Spain
- Occupations: Actor and model
- Years active: 2013–present
- Height: 1.54 m (5 ft 0.63 in)
- Parents: Juan Carlos Castañé (father); Nuria García (mother)
- Relatives: Berta Castañé (sister); Joan Castañé (brother)
- Website: Carla Castañé

Carla Castañé García (born June 1, 2005, in Sabadell) is a Catalan actress and model.

== Biography ==
Carla Castañé was born on June 1, 2005, in Sabadell, in the province of Barcelona (Spain), to mother Nuria García and father Juan Carlos Castañé, and has a sister named Berta (also an actress and model) and a brother who her name is Joan.

== Career ==
Carla Castañé in 2014 made her first appearance on the small screen in the 39+1 series, in the role of Taüll. The following year, in 2015, she participated in the 080 Barcellona Fashion competition.

In 2015 she played the role of Marta as a child in the film Cómo sobrevivir a una despedida directed by Manuela Burló Moreno. The following year, in 2016, she held the role of Mariona in the Cites series.

In 2019 she played the role of Bea as a young man in the film Gente que viene y bah directed by Patricia Font. The following year, in 2020, he starred in the short film Forastera directed by Lucía Aleñar Iglesias.

== Filmography ==
=== Film ===
Year	Title	Role	Director
2015	Cómo sobrevivir a una despedida	Marta as a child	Manuela Burló Moreno
2019	Gente que va y viene	Bea as a young man	Patricia Font

=== TV series ===
Year	Title	Role
2014	39+1	Taüll
2016	Cites	Mariona

=== Short films ===
Year	Title	Director
2020	Forastera	Lucía Aleñar Iglesias

== Fashion ==
Year	Title
2015	080 Barcellona Fashion
