= Belén Écija =

Spanish actress and playwright (born 1994)

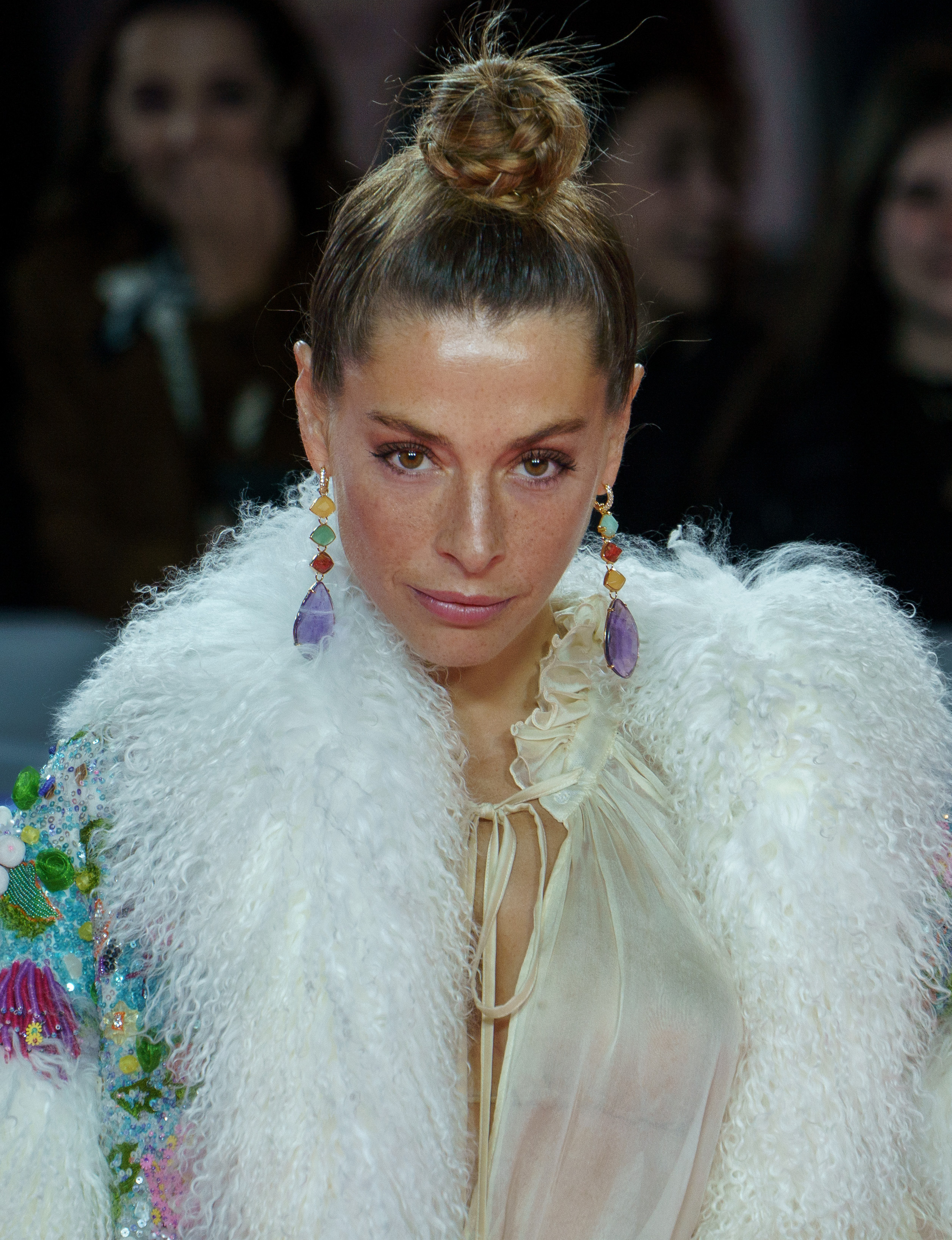
- Écija in 2025
- Born: Belén Écija Rueda; September 29, 1994 (age 31); Madrid, Spain
- Occupations: Actress, playwright
- Spouse: Jaime Sánchez (2019–present)
- Parents: Daniel Écija (father); Belén Rueda (mother)

Belén Écija Rueda (born 29 September 1994) is a Spanish actress and playwright best known for her role in the science fiction series La valla and for portraying Ainhoa Arminza in the daily drama 4 estrellas.

== Early life ==
Belén Écija was born in Madrid into a family dedicated to the arts. She is the eldest daughter of producer and director Daniel Écija and actress and television presenter Belén Rueda.

She began studying Audiovisual Communication while taking acting lessons at Estudio Corazza and the Raquel Pérez School. She spent a year at Iona College in New York, where she aimed to improve her English skills, while continuing her training in voice, singing, and screenwriting.

== Career ==
Écija began her career in theatre as both actress and playwright in the production #LaIra. Her breakthrough came when she portrayed Daniela in the dystopian series La valla on Netflix.

She then played Almu, a rebellious and charismatic surgeon, in Madres. Amor y vida, a series produced by Alea Media and streamed on Amazon Prime Video.

In 2023, she joined the cast of Entre tierras (broadcast on Antena 3) as the character Llanos Herrero. That same year, she began portraying chef Ainhoa Arminza in the daily series 4 estrellas, produced by The Good Mood and aired on La 1 by Televisión Española and RTVE Play.

== Filmography ==
=== Television ===
Year	Title	Network	Role	Notes
2020	La valla	Antena 3	Daniela Covarrubias	13 episodes
2021–2022	Madres. Amor y vida	Amazon Prime Video / Telecinco	Almudena Cobos	9 episodes
2023	Entre tierras	Atresplayer / Antena 3	Llanos Herrero	1 episode
2023–2024	4 estrellas	La 1	Ainhoa Arminza	250 episodes
