= The Barrier (TV series) =

2019 Spanish television series

- Spanish: La valla
- Genre: Drama
- Created by: Daniel Écija
- Starring: Unax Ugalde; Olivia Molina; Eleonora Wexler
- Country of origin: Spain
- Original language: Spanish
- No. of seasons: 1
- No. of episodes: 13

Production
- Running time: 50 min.
- Production companies: Atresmedia; Good Mood

Original release
- Network: Atresplayer Premium
- Release: January 19, 2020

The Barrier (Spanish: La valla) is a Spanish dystopian drama TV series created by Daniel Écija and starring Unax Ugalde, Olivia Molina and Eleonora Wexler. It first aired on Atresplayer Premium in January 2020. It debuted internationally in September 2020 on Netflix.

== Synopsis ==
In the 2040s, twenty years after World War III, Spain faces radiation, disease, and extreme shortages. A despotic government rises and places the country under martial law. Madrid is divided into two sectors separated by a wall. The wealthy and powerful live in relative safety and luxury, but everyone else lives in squalor and in fear of forced disappearances.

== Cast ==
- Unax Ugalde as Hugo Mujica
- Olivia Molina as Julia Pérez Noval
- Eleonora Wexler as Alma López-Durán
- Abel Folk as Luis Covarrubias
- Ángela Molina as Emilia Noval
- Manu Fullola as Coronel Enrique
- Daniel Ibáñez as Álex Mujica
- Laura Quirós as Marta Mujica
- Elena Seijo as Rosa
- Óscar de la Fuente as Fernando
- Ángela Vega as Begoña Sánchez
- Nicolás Illoro as Iván Covarrubias
- Belén Écija as Daniela Covarrubias
- Yaima Ramos as Manuela
- Alina Nastase as Chica espía.

== Release ==
The Barrier premiered on Atresplayer Premium on 19 January 2020. The finale aired on 12 April 2020. The free-to-air broadcasting run on Antena 3 started on 10 September 2020. The series was released on Netflix on 11 September 2020.

Series	Episodes	Originally released			Ref.
Series	Episodes	First released	Last released	Network	Ref.
1	13	19 January 2020	12 April 2020	ATRESplayer Premium	

No.	Title	Original release date
1	"Otro mundo"	19 January 2020
2	"Mi hermana Sara"	26 January 2020
3	"Los niños perdidos"	2 February 2020
4	"El roce de la piel"	9 February 2020
5	"Los inocentes"	8 February 2020
6	"Los pájaros sordos"	16 February 2020
7	"Un asunto de familia"	23 February 2020
8	"El hijo de nadie"	1 March 2020
8	"El hijo de nadie"	8 March 2020
9	"Recuerda quién eres"	15 March 2020
10	"La zona de la sombra"	22 March 2020
11	"La soledad de dos"	29 March 2020
12	"El discurso"	5 April 2020
13	"Últimos días del presente"	12 April 2020

== Awards and nominations ==
Year	Award	Category	Nominees	Result	Ref.
2021	8th MiM Series Awards	Best Drama Actor	Unax Ugalde	Nominated	
