= Aida, the Movie =

- Theatrical release poster
- Spanish: Aída y vuelta
- Directed by: Paco León
- Written by: Paco León; Fer Pérez
- Story by: Paco León; Fer Pérez; Henar Álvarez
- Produced by: Laura Fdez. Espeso; Javier Méndez; Ghislain Barrois; Álvaro Augustin
- Starring: Carmen Machi; Paco León; Mariano Peña; Miren Ibarguren; Marisol Ayuso; Pepe Viyuela; Eduardo Casanova; Melani Olivares; David Castillo; Canco Rodríguez; Secun de la Rosa; Pepa Rus; Oscar Reyes; Emilio Gavira
- Cinematography: Kiko de la Rica
- Edited by: Ana Álvarez-Ossorio
- Music by: Lucas Vidal
- Production companies: The Mediapro Studio; Telecinco Cinema
- Distributed by: Sony Pictures
- Release dates: 27 January 2026 (Cines Callao); 30 January 2026 (Spain)
- Running time: 98 minutes
- Country: Spain
- Language: Spanish
- Box office: €5.0 million (Spain)

Aida, the Movie (Spanish: Aída y vuelta) (Note: Literally: 'Aída and comeback'; and a wordplay on the Spanish-language idiom ida y vuelta ('outbound journey and comeback journey')) is a 2026 Spanish comedy film directed by Paco León serving as a meta-sequel to the sitcom Aída.

== Plot ==
The plot concerns the shooting of an episode of the television series Aída.

== Cast ==
- Carmen Machi as Aída
- Paco León as Luisma
- Miren Ibarguren as Soraya
- Mariano Peña as Mauricio Colmenero
- Eduardo Casanova as Fidel
- Pepe Viyuela as Chema
- Melani Olivares as Paz
- Canco Rodríguez as Barajas
- Secun de la Rosa as Toni
- David Castillo as Jonathan
- Marisol Ayuso as Eugenia
- Pepa Rus as Macu
- Óscar Reyes as Machu Pichu
- Adrián Gordillo as El Mecos

== Production ==
Aida, the Movie is a Globomedia (The Mediapro Studio) and Telecinco Cinema production, and it had the participation of Mediaset España, Mediterráneo Mediaset España Group, and Prime Video. It saw the return of most of the main cast members of the original series. A noted exception was Ana Polvorosa (Lore in the series), who declined to take part in the film. Kiko de la Rica worked as cinematographer. Shooting locations included Madrid.

María Terremoto and D'Chipen recorded a new version of the series' main tune "Que nadie levante la voz" (originally performed by Bebe) for the film.

== Release ==
Aida, the Movie received a premiere at Cines Callao on 27 January 2026. Sony Pictures Entertainment Iberia released theatrically the film in Spain on 30 January 2026. The screening of the film included a QR code in the rolling credits producing a link to a gift episode of Aída. Wiesner Distribution programmed a theatrical release in Puerto Rico, the Dominican Republic and Central American territories such as Costa Rica, Guatemala, El Salvador, and Panama for 5 February 2026 as well as a U.S. limited release a day after.

For its opening Friday, the film topped the Spanish box-office with €0.42 million. It attained a €1.63 million gross (219,000 admissions) in its opening weekend. These figures made Aida, the Movie the best opening for a Spanish production aimed at audiences aged 12 and over in seven years. By its fifth weekend it had grossed around €4.8 million and around €5 million by the time it was released on streaming on Prime Video. In the film's U.S. opening weekend in 27 theatres, the film grossed over US$220,000.

== Reception ==
Fausto Fernández of Fotogramas rated the film 4 out of 5 stars, declaring it a "brilliant comic artifact" staunchly "defending the uncomfortable and impertinent joke". Philipp Engel of Cinemanía rated the film 3 out of 5 stars, deeming it to be a "fresh and efficient proposal" that will obviously gain further points among the fans of the series.

José Carlos Pozo of HobbyConsolas gave the film 80 points, highlighting "how it blends reality and fiction while tackling thorny issues in the comedy world" as well as Machi's "excellent" performance as the best things about the film.

Elsa Fernández-Santos of El País assessed that the film not only does it work as a tribute to a memorable series, but also as a "work of autofiction about political incorrectness and the limits of humor".

Manuel J. Lombardo of Diario de Sevilla gave the film a 3-star rating, writing that "fortunately and against all odds" the film is "so much more than just nostalgic fan service".

== See also ==
- List of Spanish films of 2026
