= You Keep the Kids! =

- Theatrical release poster
- Spanish: Mamá o papá
- Directed by: Dani de la Orden
- Screenplay by: Eric Navarro
- Based on: Daddy or Mommy by Guillaume Clicquot de Mentque, Matthieu Delaporte, Jérôme Fansten, Alexandre de La Patellière
- Produced by: Mercedes Gamero; Eduardo Campoy
- Starring: Paco León; Miren Ibarguren
- Cinematography: Sergi Gallardo
- Production companies: Atresmedia Cine; Warner Bros. Entertainment España; Álamo Producciones Audiovisuales; Álamo Audiovisual Séptima Parte AIE
- Distributed by: Warner Bros. Pictures España
- Release date: 17 December 2021
- Country: Spain
- Language: Spanish

You Keep the Kids! (Spanish: Mamá o papá; transl. 'Mom or Dad') is a 2021 Spanish comedy film directed by Dani de la Orden starring Miren Ibarguren and Paco León. It is a remake of the 2015 French film Daddy or Mommy.

== Plot ==
The plot tracks Víctor and Flora, a marriage in the process of divorcing who, upon the enticing prospect of a career advance, deliberatedly try not to get the legal custody of their three children, Alexia, Juan and Sara.

== Cast ==
- Paco León as Víctor
- Miren Ibarguren as Flora
- Sofía Oria as Alexia
- Iván Renedo as Juan
- Laura Quirós as Sara
- Eva Ugarte as Marina
- Berto Romero as Edu
- Pedro Casablanc as Jefe Víctor
- Mari Paz Sayago as abogada
- Miquel Fernández as Marc
- Ester Expósito as Claudia
- Julián Villagrán as Javi
- Alberto Casado as Julián

== Production ==
The film is a remake of the 2015 French film Daddy or Mommy (original title: Papa ou maman), directed by Martin Bourboulon and written by Guillaume Clicquot de Mentque, Matthieu Delaporte, Jérôme Fansten, Alexandre de La Patellière. The screenplay was adapted by Eric Navarro. The film was produced by Atresmedia Cine alongside Warner Bros. Entertainment España, Alamo Producciones Audiovisuales and Alamo Audiovisual Séptima Parte, AIE, and it had the participation of Atresmedia, Movistar+ and Orange. Shot in between Madrid and Tenerife, filming wrapped by August 2020.

== Release ==
Originally slated for an opening in Spanish theatres on 4 December 2020, its release was postponed several times. Distributed by Warner Bros. Pictures España, the film was postponed due to the COVID-19 pandemic and eventually released theatrically in Spain on 17 December 2021.

== See also ==
- List of Spanish films of 2021
