= Cristina Alarcón =

Spanish actress

- Born: Cristina García Alarcón; 15 September 1986 (age 39); Granada, Spain
- Occupation: Actress
- Years active: 2002-present

Cristina García Alarcón (Granada; September 19, 1986), better known as Cristina Alarcón, is a Spanish actress known for her regular participation in television series such as Telecinco's B&B and Movistar+'s Vergüenza.

== Biography ==
She made her television debut at the age of 15 as host of the program El club Megatrix, broadcast on Antena 3. She became known as an actress thanks to the successful series Arrayán on Canal Sur, where she played Paula between 2006 and 2008.

Once settled in Madrid, she trained in different dance and acting schools, such as Juan Codina and Carmen Roche. Later, at La Casa de la Portera, she premiered the play Iván-Off by José Martret, an adaptation of Chekhov's Ivanov, in which Cristina played Sara Leyva. The play brought her excellent reviews and opened the doors to the national audiovisual industry.

Her first starring role was in the Telecinco fiction series B&b, de boca en boca, where she played Clara Bornay, the head stylist of a fictitious magazine in whose editorial office the plots are centered. Alarcón was part of the starring cast during the two seasons that the series was on the air. In 2015 she made her film debut with the movie El país del miedo by director Francisco Espada, which was screened at the Málaga Film Festival.

In 2018, she had chapter appearances in the series La verdad, of Telecinco, and Arde Madrid, of Movistar+. That same year she joined the cast of the second season of the series Vergüenza, also on Movistar+. In February 2019 she premiered the comedy Bajo el mismo techo, directed by Juana Macías and starring Silvia Abril and Jordi Sánchez.

== Filmography ==
=== Series ===
Year	Title	Channel	Character	Duration
2006 - 2008	Arrayán	Canal Sur	Paula Villar	34 episodes
2013	Aída	Telecinco	Blanca Gómez	1 episode
2014 - 2015	B&b, de boca en boca	Telecinco	Clara Bornay Miralles	29 episodes
2018	La verdad	Telecinco	Luisa	1 episode
2018	Arde Madrid	#0 (Movistar+)	Carmen Cervera	1 episode
2018	Vergüenza	#0 (Movistar+)	Sonia	5 episodes
2019	Secretos de estado	Telecinco	Leticia Milán	1 episode
2020	Diarios de la cuarentena	La 1	Cristina	8 episodes

=== Films ===
- El país del miedo (2015) as Susana Martín, by Francisco Espada.
- Bajo el mismo techo (2019) as Lorena, by Juana Macías.

=== Theater ===
- Iván-Off (2012) as Sara Leyva, directed by José Martret.

== Private life ==
In September 2017 she married in Granada with the also actor José Luis García after four years of relationship. In autumn 2018, the actress announced through her social networks that she was pregnant with her first child. Alarcón gave birth to a boy, Paco, in April 2019 in Madrid.
