= List of Aída episodes =

This is a list of episodes of Aída, a spin-off of 7 vidas.

== Season List ==
| Season | Episodes | Premiere | Final | Ratings | |
| Season | Episodes | Premiere | Final | Ratings | Share |
|---|---|---|---|---|---|
| 1 | 13 | 16 January 2005 | 24 April 2005 | 5.775.000 | 32,1% |
| 2 | 14 | 11 September 2005 | 18 December 2005 | 5.334.000 | 29,8% |
| 3 | 14 | 14 May 2006 | 1 October 2006 | 3.908.000 | 27,6% |
| 4 | 16 | 7 January 2007 | 22 April 2007 | 5.079.000 | 27,7% |
| 5 | 26 | 2 December 2007 | 15 June 2008 | 5.700.000 | 30,7% |
| 6 | 27 | 14 December 2008 | 21 June 2009 | 4.282.000 | 22,3% |
| 7 | 15 | 4 April 2010 | 18 July 2010 | 3.286.000 | 18,3% |
| 8 | 27 | 5 September 2010 | 24 April 2011 | 3.151.000 | 16,5% |
| 9 | 27 | 30 October 2011 | 16 September 2012 | 3.458.000 | 17,0% |
| 10 | 38 | 15 September 2013 | 16 June 2014 | 2.766.000 | 14,2% |
| Total | 237 | 2005 | - | 3.920.388 | 24,7% |

== Episodes ==
| Episode | Number | Airdate | Ratings | Share |
|---|---|---|---|---|
First season
| Capitulo 001 Temporada 01x01 | Una nueva vida (piloto) | 16/01/2005 | 6.863.000 | 36,0% |
| Capitulo 002 Temporada 01x02 | Tootsie que vales | 23/01/2005 | 6.524.000 | 34,0% |
| Capitulo 003 Temporada 01x03 | ¿Pero qué invento es éste? | 30/01/2005 | 5.074.000 | 25,7% |
| Capitulo 004 Temporada 01x04 | Sex, lies and videotapes | 06/02/2005 | 5.672.000 | 30,0% |
| Capitulo 005 Temporada 01x05 | Aída y el cartero | 13/02/2005 | 5.849.000 | 30,6% |
| Capitulo 006 Temporada 01x06 | La LOGSE no es para mí | 20/02/2005 | 5.789.000 | 30,6% |
| Capitulo 007 Temporada 01x07 | Memorias de una fulana | 27/02/2005 | 5.585.000 | 29,3% |
| Capitulo 008 Temporada 01x08 | El señor del Anillo | 06/03/2005 | 6.080.000 | 31,8% |
| Capitulo 009 Temporada 01x09 | El tramposo, el tonto, el putero y su amante | 20/03/2005 | 4.420.000 | 28,3% |
| Capitulo 010 Temporada 01x10 | La madre que gritó puta | 03/04/2005 | 6.059.000 | 34,7% |
| Capitulo 011 Temporada 01x11 | Por la gloria de mi madre | 10/04/2005 | 5.621.000 | 30,9% |
| Capitulo 012 Temporada 01x12 | Inteligencia artificiosa | 17/04/2005 | 5.690.000 | 31,7% |
| Capitulo 013 Temporada 01x13 | Mi gran boda venezolana (Season Finale) | 24/04/2005 | 5.846.000 | 32,1% |
Second season
| Capitulo 014 Temporada 02x01 | Bajo el peso de la ley | 11/09/2005 | 4.350.000 | 28,7% |
| Capitulo 015 Temporada 02x02 | Los freakis de calendario | 18/09/2005 | 4.526.000 | 28,0% |
| Capitulo 016 Temporada 02x03 | Black is black | 25/09/2005 | 4.551.000 | 27,5% |
| Capitulo 017 Temporada 02x04 | Jonnhy cogió su violín | 02/10/2005 | 5.496.000 | 31,9% |
| Capitulo 018 Temporada 02x05 | El ataque de los clones | 09/10/2005 | 4.952.000 | 27,9% |
| Capitulo 019 Temporada 02x06 | Dead man | 16/10/2005 | 5.309.000 | 29,4% |
| Capitulo 020 Temporada 02x07 | Una jaula de grillos | 23/10/2005 | 5.420.000 | 30,6% |
| Capitulo 021 Temporada 02x08 | Los trilocos | 06/11/2005 | 5.436.000 | 29,3% |
| Capitulo 022 Temporada 02x09 | Tendero soltero blanco busca | 13/11/2005 | 6.310.000 | 32,6% |
| Capitulo 023 Temporada 02x10 | From lost to the river | 20/11/2005 | 5.648.000 | 29,7% |
| Capitulo 024 Temporada 02x11 | Todo es mentira | 27/11/2005 | 5.814.000 | 29,6% |
| Capitulo 025 Temporada 02x12 | Amor ciego | 04/12/2005 | 5.816.000 | 32,1% |
| Capitulo 026 Temporada 02x13 | Adivina quien no viene a cenar esta noche | 11/12/2005 | 6.087.000 | 32,9% |
| Capitulo 027 Temporada 02x14 | Guiness de los magos (Season Finale) | 18/12/2005 | 4.967.000 | 27,4% |
Third season
| Capitulo 028 Temporada 03x01 | El imperio del sinsentido | 14/05/2006 | 4.589.000 | 29,4% |
| Capitulo 029 Temporada 03x02 | Love actually | 21/05/2006 | 4.834.000 | 30,0% |
| Capitulo 030 Temporada 03x03 | Días de radio | 28/05/2006 | 4.174.000 | 27,1% |
| Capitulo 031 Temporada 03x04 | Tu madre se ha comido mi dedo | 04/06/2006 | 4.204.000 | 28,5% |
| Capitulo 032 Temporada 03x05 | El memo que mece la cuna | 11/06/2006 | 3.872.000 | 25,4% |
| Capitulo 033 Temporada 03x06 | Carne de gallina | 18/06/2006 | 4.265.000 | 27,4% |
| Capitulo 034 Temporada 03x07 | Mini size me | 25/06/2006 | 3.534.000 | 24,5% |
| Capitulo 035 Temporada 03x08 | Los insaciables de Elliot Ness | 02/07/2006 | 3.712.000 | 28,1% |
| Capitulo 036 Temporada 03x09 | The Fast and the Furioso | 09/07/2006 | 2.403.000 | 27,2% |
| Capitulo 037 Temporada 03x10 | Los Luismas del infierno | 16/07/2006 | 3.297.000 | 26,3% |
| Capitulo 038 Temporada 03x11 | Entre copas | 10/09/2006 | 3.936.000 | 30,0% |
| Capitulo 039 Temporada 03x12 | Tierras de pirula | 17/09/2006 | 4.073.000 | 28,1% |
| Capitulo 040 Temporada 03x13 | Miss adorable vecina | 24/09/2006 | 3.805.000 | 25,8% |
| Capitulo 041 Temporada 03x14 | No sos Vos, soy Yo (Season Finale) | 01/10/2006 | 4.011.000 | 28,0% |
Fourth season
| Capitulo 042 Temporada 04x01 | Misterioso asesinato en Esperanza Sur | 07/01/2007 | 5.443.000 | 28,5% |
| Capitulo 043 Temporada 04x02 | Los servicios de Paz | 14/01/2007 | 4.655.000 | 24,3% |
| Capitulo 044 Temporada 04x03 | El enano oscuro del corazón | 21/01/2007 | 4.829.000 | 24,8% |
| Capitulo 045 Temporada 04x04 | Mi madre se ha comido a mi compañero de piso | 28/01/2007 | 4.583.000 | 23,0% |
| Capitulo 046 Temporada 04x05 | Million Dollar Luisma | 04/02/2007 | 5.698.000 | 30,3% |
| Capitulo 047 Temporada 04x06 | El último Tang en Madrid | 11/02/2007 | 5.631.000 | 30,0% |
| Capitulo 048 Temporada 04x07 | El cielo puede esperar | 18/02/2007 | 4.840.000 | 25,3% |
| Capitulo 049 Temporada 04x08 | Bienvenido Míster Juancar | 25/02/2007 | 5.197.000 | 28,7% |
| Capitulo 050 Temporada 04x09 | Yo soy la Macu | 04/03/2007 | 5.599.000 | 30,1% |
| Capitulo 051 Temporada 04x10 | El retorno del gay | 11/03/2007 | 5.306.000 | 28,1% |
| Capitulo 052 Temporada 04x11 | We are a happy family | 18/03/2007 | 5.186.000 | 28,9% |
| Capitulo 053 Temporada 04x12 | Charli y la fábrica de prostitutas | 01/04/2007 | 5.125.000 | 28,6% |
| Capitulo 054 Temporada 04x13 | El calor del dinero | 01/04/2007 | 4.128.000 | 27,9% |
| Capitulo 055 Temporada 04x14 | Hasta que llegó su O.R.A. | 08/04/2007 | 4.946.000 | 29,0% |
| Capitulo 056 Temporada 04x15 | Así en el cielo como en la tienda | 15/04/2007 | 4.949.000 | 27,0% |
| Capitulo 057 Temporada 04x16 | Atraco a las diez (Season Finale) | 22/04/2007 | 5.151.000 | 29,3% |
Fifth season
| Capitulo 058 Temporada 05x01 | Leaving Esperanza Sur | 02/12/2007 | 5.952.000 | 30,9% |
| Capitulo 059 Temporada 05x02 | La inmigración vive arriba | 09/12/2007 | 5.500.000 | 29,6% |
| Capitulo 060 Temporada 05x03 | Los creyentes | 16/12/2007 | 5.786.000 | 31,3% |
| Capitulo 061 Temporada 05x04 | En algun lugar de la cancha | 23/12/2007 | 4.631.000 | 26,2% |
| Capitulo 062 Temporada 05x05 | El cobrador | 06/01/2008 | 4.924.000 | 28,4% |
| Capitulo 063 Temporada 05x06 | La vuelta | 13/01/2008 | 5.908.000 | 30,8% |
| Capitulo 064 Temporada 05x07 | Cuestión de riñones | 20/01/2008 | 6.282.000 | 33,2% |
| Capitulo 065 Temporada 05x08 | Como chachas y a lo loco | 27/01/2008 | 5.778.000 | 31,0% |
| Capitulo 066 Temporada 05x09 | 21 (kilo) gramos | 03/02/2008 | 5.675.000 | 29,9% |
| Capitulo 067 Temporada 05x10 | La que se adivina | 10/02/2008 | 5.760.000 | 30,4% |
| Capitulo 068 Temporada 05x11 | Oro salvaje | 17/02/2008 | 6.021.000 | 31,6% |
| Capitulo 069 Temporada 05x12 | Una proposición indecente | 24/02/2008 | 5.673.000 | 29,7% |
| Capitulo 070 Temporada 05x13 | Llega la ceremonia | 02/03/2008 | 6.642.000 | 35,6% |
| Capitulo 071 Temporada 05x14 | Brokeback Prision | 16/03/2008 | 5.328.000 | 31,3% |
| Capitulo 072 Temporada 05x15 | Cómo está el servicio | 23/03/2008 | 5.136.000 | 30,6% |
| Capitulo 073 Temporada 05x16 | Pasión, alcohol y un bebé | 30/03/2008 | 5.613.000 | 29,7% |
| Capitulo 074 Temporada 05x17 | ¡Es negro! | 06/04/2008 | 5.805.000 | 30,0% |
| Capitulo 075 Temporada 05x18 | El hombre que sabía demasiado yoga | 13/04/2008 | 6.034.000 | 31,5% |
| Capitulo 076 Temporada 05x19 | El Robobo de la Telele | 20/04/2008 | 6.118.000 | 31,2% |
| Capitulo 077 Temporada 05x20 | Tony Brockovinch | 27/04/2008 | 5.352.000 | 28,8% |
| Capitulo 078 Temporada 05x21 | Atrapado por su pasado | 04/05/2008 | 5.335.000 | 30,2% |
| Capitulo 079 Temporada 05x22 | La danza del vientre | 11/05/2008 | 4.845.000 | 25,4% |
| Capitulo 080 Temporada 05x23 | Top manta | 18/05/2008 | 5.688.000 | 30,2% |
| Capitulo 081 Temporada 05x24 | Lleno, por favor | 25/05/2008 | 6.396.000 | 34,7% |
| Capitulo 082 Temporada 05x25 | Intercambio radical | 01/06/2008 | 5.862.000 | 31,9% |
| Capitulo 083 Temporada 05x26 | Pareja perfecta (Season Finale) | 15/06/2008 | 6.161.000 | 34,7% |
Sixth season
| Capitulo 084 Temporada 06x01 | Aerobiza como puedas | 14/12/2008 | 5.064.000 | 26,4% |
| Capitulo 085 Temporada 06x02 | Yonki de guardería | 21/12/2008 | 4.544.000 | 23,9% |
| Capitulo 086 Temporada 06x03 | Paz la dulce | 25/12/2008 | 3.198.000 | 17,5% |
| Capitulo 087 Temporada 06x04 | Vuelta de tuerca | 28/12/2008 | 5.424.000 | 28,3% |
| Capitulo 088 Temporada 06x05 | El regreso de Soraya | 04/01/2009 | 5.107.000 | 26,4% |
| Capitulo 089 Temporada 06x06 | Hasta que llegó Soraya | 11/01/2009 | 5.735.000 | 29,2% |
| Capitulo 090 Temporada 06x07 | La familia mata | 13/01/2009 | 4.897.000 | 24,0% |
| Capitulo 091 Temporada 06x08 | No es país para pijas | 20/01/2009 | 5.216.000 | 25,4% |
| Capitulo 092 Temporada 06x09 | Héroe por delincuente | 27/01/2009 | 4.885.000 | 24,4% |
| Capitulo 093 Temporada 06x10 | El color del dinero | 03/02/2009 | 4.753.000 | 23,5% |
| Capitulo 094 Temporada 06x11 | Si te dicen que caí | 10/02/2009 | 4.091.000 | 19,9% |
| Capitulo 095 Temporada 06x12 | El día D | 17/02/2009 | 4.880.000 | 25,2% |
| Capitulo 096 Temporada 06x13 | Lo mejor de mí | 24/02/2009 | 4.846.000 | 25,2% |
| Capitulo 097 Temporada 06x14 | Este muerto está muy muerto | 08/03/2009 | 4.444.000 | 21,9% |
| Capitulo 098 Temporada 06x15 | Mamá por sorpresa | 15/03/2009 | 3.502.000 | 18,2% |
| Capitulo 099 Temporada 06x16 | No sin mi famoso | 22/03/2009 | 4.339.000 | 22,3% |
| Capitulo 100 Temporada 06x17 | Esperanza Broadway | 29/03/2009 | 4.206.000 | 20,7% |
| Capitulo 101 Temporada 06x18 | Cirugía es tética | 05/04/2009 | 3.494.000 | 19,2% |
| Capitulo 102 Temporada 06x19 | Chíllame que te veo | 12/04/2009 | 3.433.000 | 18,8% |
| Capitulo 103 Temporada 06x20 | Esperanza beauty | 19/04/2009 | 4.111.000 | 20,9% |
| Capitulo 104 Temporada 06x21 | La toma de la pastilla | 03/05/2009 | 2.827.000 | 15,7% |
| Capitulo 105 Temporada 06x22 | El amigo inservible | 10/05/2009 | 3.740.000 | 19,0% |
| Capitulo 106 Temporada 06x23 | Algas para recordar | 17/05/2009 | 3.437.000 | 18,6% |
| Capitulo 107 Temporada 06x24 | Mal adentro | 24/05/2009 | 3.796.000 | 20,8% |
| Capitulo 108 Temporada 06x25 | El barrendero | 31/05/2009 | 3.602.000 | 20,5% |
| Capitulo 109 Temporada 06x26 | Luisma el barrendero | 07/06/2009 | 4.222.000 | 23,3% |
| Capitulo 110 Temporada 06x27 | Putero y yo (Season Finale) | 21/06/2009 | 3.827.000 | 22,9% |
Seventh season
| Capitulo 111 Temporada 07x01 | Mauricio piscinas | 04/04/2010 | 3.530.000 | 20,6% |
| Capitulo 112 Temporada 07x02 | COI empieza todo | 11/04/2010 | 3.247.000 | 16,7% |
| Capitulo 113 Temporada 07x03 | La estrategia del esquirol | 18/04/2010 | 3.302.000 | 17,0% |
| Capitulo 114 Temporada 07x04 | Corazón latino | 25/04/2010 | 3.604.000 | 18,9% |
| Capitulo 115 Temporada 07x05 | Con ocho subasta | 25/04/2010 | 3.994.000 | 24,8% |
| Capitulo 116 Temporada 07x06 | En tetas hay paraíso | 02/05/2010 | 3.063.000 | 16,1% |
| Capitulo 117 Temporada 07x07 | El torero y el padre tonto de Fidel | 09/05/2010 | 3.436.000 | 16,9% |
| Capitulo 118 Temporada 07x08 | Diez razones para odiarte | 16/05/2010 | 3.148.000 | 16,7% |
| Capitulo 119 Temporada 07x09 | Moros y cristianos | 23/05/2010 | 3.088.000 | 17,7% |
| Capitulo 120 Temporada 07x10 | Macu, qué será lo que quiere el negro | 30/05/2010 | 3.318.000 | 18,7% |
| Capitulo 121 Temporada 07x11 | El silencio de los toreros | 06/06/2010 | 2.829.000 | 16,2% |
| Capitulo 122 Temporada 07x12 | En busca del Bobo Fisher | 13/06/2010 | 3.259.000 | 17,1% |
| Capitulo 123 Temporada 07x13 | La loca, loca historia de la bola loca | 20/06/2010 | 3.585.000 | 19,4% |
| Capitulo 124 Temporada 07x14 | Cuando vuelvas a mi helado | 27/06/2010 | 3.444.000 | 19,4% |
| Capitulo 125 Temporada 07x15 | Buenas chuches y buena suerte (Season Finale) | 14/02/2011 | 2.444.000 | 18.0% |
Eighth season
| Capitulo 126 Temporada 08x01 | Miami Bitch | 5/09/2010 | 2.702.000 | 17.6% |
| Capitulo 127 Temporada 08x02 | Furgo | 12/09/2010 | 3.007.000 | 18.0% |
| Capitulo 128 Temporada 08x03 | El año que vivimos peligrosamente | 12/09/2010 | 33032.000 | 21.1% |
| Capitulo 129 Temporada 08x04 | Los (a)brazos rotos | 19/09/2010 | 3.070.000 | 16.6% |
| Capitulo 130 Temporada 08x05 | En un momento candado | 19/07/2010 | 3.309.000 | 20.6% |
| Capitulo 131 Temporada 08x06 | El padre de la novia | 26/09/2010 | 2.86.000 | 14.5% |
| Capitulo 132 Temporada 08x07 | Todos los porros van al cielo | 3/09/2010 | 3.291.000 | 16.6% |
| Capitulo 133 Temporada 08x08 | Canción de tuna | 10/10/2010 | 2.926.000 | 16.1% |
| Capitulo 134 Temporada 08x09 | Cabra los ojos | 24/10/2010 | 3.243.000 | 16.0% |
| Capitulo 135 Temporada 08x10 | Las normas de la casa de las chicas | 31/10/2010 | 2.457.000 | 14.9% |
| Capitulo 136 Temporada 08x11 | Luisma killed radio star | 7/11/2010 | 2.946.000 | 14.7% |
| Capitulo 137 Temporada 08x12 | Bailando con el enemigo | 14/11/2010 | 3.045.000 | 15.0% |
| Capitulo 138 Temporada 08x13 | ¡A votar! | 21/11/2010 | 3.443.000 | 16.3% |
| Capitulo 139 Temporada 08x14 | El gran Chemowski | 28/11/2010 | 3.606.000 | 16.8% |
| Capitulo 140 Temporada 08x15 | Sorarnie la ladrona | 12/12/2010 | 3.120.000 | 15.4% |
| Capitulo 141 Temporada 08x16 | Bro, bro, bro, broker face | 19/12/2010 | 3.165.000 | 15.4% |
| Capitulo 142 Temporada 08x17 | La noche de los belenes vivientes | 26/12/2010 | 3.283.000 | 16.8% |
| Capitulo 143 Temporada 08x18 | Si, si, meretriz | 27/02/2011 | 3 693.000 | 17.9% |
| Capitulo 144 Temporada 08x19 | El camino que lleva a Belén | 27/02/2011 | 3.709.000 | 22.4% |
| Capitulo 145 Temporada 08x20 | Enamorado de la boda juvenil | 6/02/2011 | 3 602.000 | 17.5% |
| Capitulo 146 Temporada 08x21 | In luisment | 6/02/2011 | 3.380.000 | 20.1% |
| Capitulo 147 Temporada 08x22 | Luc, me cago en tu padre | 13/02/2011 | 3.200.000 | 15.4% |
| Capitulo 148 Temporada 08x23 | Con ratón salvaje | 20/02/2011 | 2.975.000 | 14.4% |
| Capitulo 149 Temporada 08x24 | Corre, Chema, corre | 27/02/2011 | 3.144.000 | 15.0% |
| Capitulo 150 Temporada 08x25 | Urovisión imposible | 3/03/2011 | 3.130.000 | 14.7% |
| Capitulo 151 Temporada 08x26 | Alargador domingo de noviazgo | 10/03/2011 | 3.187.000 | 16.1% |
| Capitulo 152 Temporada 08x27 | Casting power | 17/03/2011 | 2.950.000 | 15.6% |
| Capitulo 153 Temporada 08x28 | Ra ta ta Touille (Season finale) | 24/03/2011 | 2.819.000 | 15.0% |
