= Queens (film) =

- Theatrical release poster
- Spanish: Reinas
- Directed by: Manuel Gómez Pereira
- Written by: Joaquín Oristrell; Manuel Gómez Pereira; Yolanda García Serrano
- Produced by: José Luis Escolar
- Starring: Carmen Maura; Marisa Paredes; Mercedes Sampietro; Verónica Forqué; Unax Ugalde; Paco León; Jorge Perugorría
- Cinematography: Juan Amorós
- Edited by: José Salcedo
- Music by: Bingen Mendizábal
- Production companies: Warner Bros. Pictures España; Lucky Red; Fortissimo Films
- Distributed by: Warner Bros. Pictures
- Release date: 8 April 2005
- Running time: 107 minutes
- Country: Spain
- Language: Spanish

Queens (Spanish: Reinas) is a 2005 film directed by Manuel Gómez Pereira.

The story follows a group of men who will be marrying in Spain's first same-sex wedding ceremony, and their mothers, who will be attending.

== Plot ==
Magda (Carmen Maura) is the manager of a posh resort hotel in Madrid which will be the site of a mass same-sex marriage ceremony. One of the grooms is Magda's son Miguel (Unax Ugalde), a designer, who will marry his boyfriend Óscar (Daniel Hendler), son of Ofelia (Betiana Blum), who is "visiting" from Argentina with her dog...

Nuria (Verónica Forqué), a sex addict, is also on her way to attend the ceremony. Her son Narciso (Paco León) will be marrying his boyfriend Hugo (Gustavo Salmerón), whose own parents, Helena (Mercedes Sampietro) and Hector (Tito Valverde), are less enthusiastic.

Meanwhile, actress Reyes (Marisa Paredes) will be attending to watch her son Rafa (Raúl Jiménez) marry his boyfriend Jonas (Hugo Silva), the son of her gardener Jacinto (Lluís Homar).

== Cast ==
- Verónica Forqué as Nuria
- Carmen Maura as Magda
- Marisa Paredes as Reyes
- Mercedes Sampietro as Helena
- Betiana Blum as Ofelia
- Gustavo Salmerón as Hugo
- Unax Ugalde as Miguel
- Hugo Silva as Jonás
- Daniel Hendler as Óscar
- Paco León as Narciso
- Raúl Jiménez as Rafa
- Tito Valverde as Héctor
- Lluís Homar as Jacinto
- Jorge Perugorría as César
- Ginés García Millán as Néstor
- José Luis García Pérez as Pasajero Tren
- Pep Guinyol as Juez
- José Albarrán as Mozo de Estación (station porter)
- Quim Capdevila as Recepcionista Hotel (Hotel Receptionist)
- Lázaro Aldama as Portero Hotel
- Luis Salguero as Médico Urgencias
- Pedro Civera as Sergio
- Quim Vila as Santiago
- José Carlos Yus as Empleado 1
- Joan Crosas as Marc
- Felipe Andrés as Maitre Restaurante
- Guillermo Muñoz as Camarero Restaurante (restaurant waiter)
- Daniel Alberto García as Actor Culebrón
- Daniel Núñez as Ladrón Minusválido
- Sandro Cordero as Dueño Chiringuito
- Jaime Ordóñez as Agente Policía
- Mariano Peña as Julián
- Jesús Ruyman as Jardinero 1 (Gardener)
- Mercedes Castro as Mujer Jardinero 1
- Eduardo Uceda as Hijo Jardinero 1
- Lucina Gil as Mónica
- Vicente Colomar as Camarero Restaurante
- Yolanda Alzola as Periodista 1 (journalist)
- Pablo Vázquez as Periodista 2
- Joaquín Oliván as Periodista 3
- Claudio Pantaleón as Fotógrafo 1 (photographer)
- Fran Fernnández as Fotógrafo 2
- Carlos Lorenzo as Policía Antidisturbios
- David Salazar as José
- Marta Aledo as Chica Organización
- Ricardo Castro as Portero Discoteca
- Andrea Occhipinti as Chico Organización
- Julio Arrojo as Empleado AVE (employee)
- José Luis Díaz as Hombre Tren 1
- Manuel Vidal as Empleado Catering
- Filippo Morelli as Hombre Tren 2
- David Agueda as Grupo de baile (Dance group)
- Santos Blanco as Grupo de baile
- Pedro Antonio Carrasco as Grupo de baile
- Juan José Hinojosa as Grupo de baile
- Javier Jiménez as Grupo de baile
- Mark Vicent Dickers as Grupo de baile

== Reception ==
Queens received mixed reviews from critics. Rotten Tomatoes gives the film an approval rating of 45% from 31 critics.

Andre Soares of Alt Film Guide notes "cheesy commercialism and sentimentality aside, Reinas boasts a couple of first-rate performances" and it "delivers more than a few good laughs". Anthony Mardon of abusdecine.com remarks that the "director has managed to bring together the muses of Pedro Almodovar" and "the film enjoys, indeed, irresistible and colorful moments, but the rhythmic, too sawtooth, and some situations vaudevillesques, pulled by the hair, spoil the coherence". Thomas G. Deveny states in his book 'Migration in Contemporary Hispanic Cinema' in 2012, "it has international stars and casts them as immigrants in a world of luxury".

== See also ==
- List of Spanish films of 2005
