= Paco León =

Spanish actor, producer, director, screenwriter, and activist

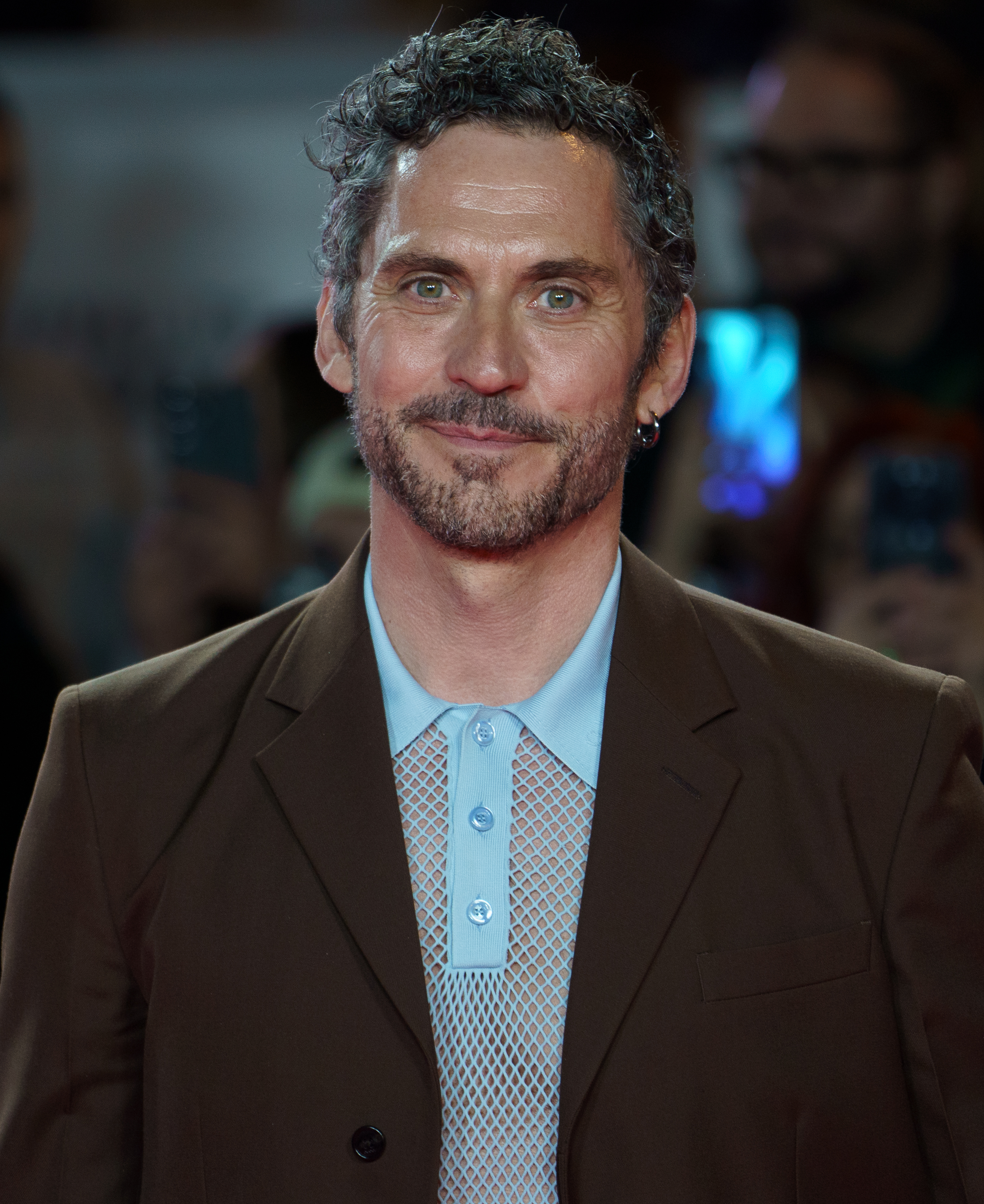
- León in 2025
- Born: Francisco León Barrios; Seville, Spain
- Occupations: Actor; film director; television director; screenwriter
- Children: 1
- Family: María León (sister)

Francisco León Barrios, known as Paco León (Spanish pronunciation: [ˈpako leˈon]) is a Spanish actor, producer, director, screenwriter and activist.

Born in Seville, León began his career in television comedy roles in Andalusian regional productions. Following appearances in sketch show Homo Zapping, he became popular in Spain for his performance from 2005 to 2014 in sitcom Aída, portraying Luisma, a good-natured rehabilitated drug addict. In addition to his acting career, he has also pursued an activity as a filmmaker and show creator, starting with his debut feature Carmina or Blow Up (2012), for which he was nominated to the Goya Award for Best New Director. He has since featured in series such as The House of Flowers and Arde Madrid (also show creator) and films such as Kiki, Love to Love (also director).

He is also a prominent campaigner for HIV/AIDS causes.

== Career ==
León's first roles were in comedy television, on Mariquilla Ríe Perlas and Castillos en el aire in 1999. These played on Canal Sur, the channel of Andalusia. León has had success in theatre throughout his career, first appearing on stage in 2001. He moved to Madrid in 2003 to continue his career, where his first big job was impersonating personalities on Homo Zapping, where he was noticed for popular imitations of women like Anne Igartiburu and Raquel Revuelta. He is best known for playing Luisma, a recovering drug addict, on Aída, a role he played for nine years and which garnered him many Best Actor awards.

He has also had notable film roles, as an OCD patient in Toc Toc and a playboy in The Tribe. As a voice and dubbing actor, he has had roles in Valiant and Madagascar, and as a film director, his debut was the 2012 Carmina or Blow Up, for which he was nominated for a Goya as Best Directorial Debut. His mother and sister star in the film, and were both nominated for acting Goyas. His third directorial feature was Kiki, Love to Love, in which he stars and was similarly multi-nominated. For his 2014 film, Carmina and Amen, the El Confidencial writer Juan Manuel Fernández suggested that he was becoming "the new Pedro Almodóvar", particularly highlighting the funeral scene that opens Carmina y amén and saying it has "a poetry only comparable to" the opening scene of Volver. Fernández also notes how both León and Almodóvar are influenced by the women in their lives, that they both often work with a sibling, and celebrate their mothers in their films.

In 2018, he created Arde Madrid with his wife at the time, Anna R. Costa, a black and white miniseries about Ava Gardner, in which he also played Gardner's chauffeur. From 2018 to 2020, he portrayed trans woman María José Riquelme on The House of Flowers. Regarding working on The House of Flowers, León says working with Verónica Castro was an honour.

In 2019, profiling the actor, Dann Dulin wrote that León's "persona and popularity are akin to a James Franco or Jake Gyllenhaal".

Shooting of León's four feature (Rainbow) wrapped by October 2021. Penned alongside Javier Gullón, it consists of a loose adaptation of The Wonderful Wizard of Oz. It is set for a 2022 release.

In 2024, it was reported that Paco León was set to direct and co-write a film titled Aída y vuelta involving the return of the beloved Aída characters, due to begin filming in the first trimester of 2025.

== Personal life ==
León's mother is Carmina Barrios. He has one sister, María León, who is also an actress. Both his mother and sister starred as characters based on themselves in the films Carmina or Blow Up (2012) and Carmina and Amen (2014), which Paco wrote and directed. María and Paco also play siblings in The House of Flowers. León met the Catalan playwright Anna Rodríguez Costa in 2006 in a play, going on to act in a short she directed later that year; she was also an acting teacher to María. León said that at the time they met, he had a boyfriend, but knew that he wanted to be with her. The couple have been together since 2006 and wrote the screenplay for Arde Madrid together. They have a daughter (born 2010), and Costa's son Eloi (born c. 1994) is León's stepson. Costa also appears in Carmina and Amen.

In 2020, after 14 years together, the couple broke up.

He is openly bisexual, and actively campaigns for HIV/AIDS causes. He has several friends living with the disease and has worked with organisations including Fundación Triángulo, Apoyo Positivo, StopSIDA, and the Fight Against AIDS Foundation since at least 2009, which largely offer support to the LGBT+ community in Spain, as well as fundraising for the work of eminent HIV researcher Bonaventura Clotet. León has said that he became aware of the AIDS epidemic when Rock Hudson died, but has also had a scare personally.

León became the subject of media attention when he promised to tweet a nude photo of himself after gaining one million Twitter followers, which he did in October 2013; he posted a video running naked across a golf course to celebrate a million followers on Instagram in 2019, following this up with more nudes. He is a relatively private person and does not often give press interviews.

== Filmography ==
=== Acting roles ===
==== Film ====
Key
†	Denotes films that have not yet been released

Year	Title	Role	Ref.
2001	Amar y Morir en Sevilla, Don Juan Tenorio		
2002	Asalto informatico		
2003	La vida mancha		
2004	Recambios		
2005	Reinas (Queens)	Narciso	
2006	La dama boba (Lady Nitwit)	Maestro de danza	
2006	Los managers	Pipo	
2009	Dieta mediterránea (Mediterranean Food)	Toni	
2013	3 bodas de más (Three Many Weddings)	Mikel	
2016	Embarazados (We Are Pregnant)	Fran	
2016	Kiki, el amor se hace (Kiki, Love to Love)	Paco	
2016	7 Años	Luis	
2017	Toc Toc	Emilio	
2018	La tribu (The Tribe)	Fidel	
2021	Mama o papá (You Keep the Kids!)	Víctor	
2022	The Unbearable Weight of Massive Talent	Lucas	
2022	No mires a los ojos (Staring at Strangers)	Damián	
2023	Mari(dos) (Co-husbands)	Toni	
2024	Sin instrucciones (Babies Don't Come with Instructions)	Leo	
2024	Un hipster en la España vacía (A Hipster in Rural Spain)	Gaspar	
2025	Uno equis dos (One X Two)	Chino	
2025	Miss Carbón (Queen of Coal)	Antonio Muñoz	
2026	Aída y vuelta (Aida, the Movie)	Himself / Luis Mariano "Luisma" García	
2026	Mi querida señorita (My Dearest Señorita)	Padre José María	

==== Short films ====
- La grieta by Enrique López de Haro
- Días rojos (2004)
- Con lengua (2006) by Anna R. Costa
- Espagueti western (2007) (Voice)

==== Television ====
- Castillos en el aire (1999) on Canal Sur
- Jet Lag (2000)
- Moncloa, digame on Telecinco, FDF
- Homo Zapping on Antena 3 TV (2003–2005)
- 7 vidas on Telecinco (2004, 2005)
- Aída on Telecinco (2005-2014)
- Planeta Finito on La Sexta (2007)
- Ácaros on Cuatro (2007)
- La peste on Movistar+ (2017)
- The House of Flowers on Netflix (2018)
- Arde Madrid (Madrid on Fire), Movistar (2018)
- Blowing Kisses, on Star (2021)
- Drag Race España, on ATRESplayer Premium (2023)

=== Voice acting ===
==== Film ====
Year	Title	Role	Publisher	Ref.
2005	Madagascar	Alex	Spain's Spanish dub	
2005	Valiant	Valiant	Spain's Spanish dub	
2008	Madagascar: Escape 2 Africa	Alex	Spain's Spanish dub	
2012	Madagascar 3: Europe's Most Wanted	Alex	Spain's Spanish dub	
2016	Sing	Miss Crawly	Spain's Spanish dub	

=== As director ===
Film

Year	Title	Director	Writer	Producer
2012	Carmina or Blow Up	Yes	Yes	Executive
2014	Carmina and Amen	Yes	Yes	Yes
2016	Kiki, Love to Love	Yes	Yes	No
2022	Rainbow	Yes	Yes	Yes
2026	Aída y vuelta	Yes	Yes	No

Short film

Year	Title	Director	Writer	Notes
2013	La Vuelta a la Tortilla	Yes	Yes	Content branded short film
2014	Vaca Paloma	Yes	Yes	Content branded short film
2020	Vecinooo	Yes	Yes	Content branded short film Also cinematographer, art director, sound, lighting, camera operator and props

Television

Year	Title	Creator	Director	Writer	Executive Producer	Notes
2006	Ácaros	Yes	Yes	Yes	No	TV Series; 26 episodes
2018	Arde Madrid	Yes	Yes	Yes	Yes	TV miniseries; 8 episodes Also casting director

Music video

Year	Title	Artist
2020	Lo que te falta	Soleá Morente
2020	Ojos de serpiente	Dora Postigo

== Accolades ==
Year	Award	Category	Work	Result	Ref.
2006	15th Actors and Actresses Union Awards	Best Television Actor in a Leading Role	Aída	Won	
2013	27th Goya Awards	Best New Director	Carmina or Blow Up	Nominated	
2017	31st Goya Awards	Best Adapted Screenplay	Kiki, Love to Love	Nominated	
2019	28th Actors and Actresses Union Awards	Best Actor in an International Production	The House of Flowers	Nominated	
2020	29th Actors and Actresses Union Awards	Best Actor in an International Production	The House of Flowers	Nominated	
2023	2nd Carmen Awards	Best Actor	Staring at Strangers	Nominated	
2023	2nd Carmen Awards	Best Adapted Screenplay	Rainbow	Nominated	
2025	4th Carmen Awards	Best Actor	Babies Don't Come with Instructions	Nominated	
