= Daddy or Mommy =

- Film poster
- Directed by: Martin Bourboulon
- Written by: Guillaume Clicquot de Mentque; Matthieu Delaporte; Jérôme Fansten; Alexandre de La Patellière
- Produced by: Dimitri Rassam; Alexandre de La Patellière
- Starring: Marina Foïs; Laurent Lafitte
- Cinematography: Laurent Dailland
- Edited by: Virginie Bruant
- Music by: Jérôme Rebotier
- Production companies: Chapter 2 Pathé; M6 Films; Jouror Films; Fargo Films; UMedia
- Distributed by: Pathé Distribution
- Release dates: 16 January 2015 (L'Alpe d'Huez International Comedy Film Festival); 4 February 2015
- Running time: 85 minutes
- Country: France
- Language: French
- Budget: $14.6 million
- Box office: $21.8 million

Daddy or Mommy (French: Papa ou maman) is a 2015 French comedy film directed by Martin Bourboulon. A sequel was made a year later, and it was the subject of both an Italian (Mom or Dad?) and a German remake in 2017, as well as a Spanish remake (You Keep the Kids!) in 2021, and a Mexican remake (Papá o Mamá) in 2023.

== Cast ==
- Marina Foïs as Florence Leroy
- Laurent Lafitte as Vincent Leroy
- Alexandre Desrousseaux as Mathias Leroy
- Anna Lemarchand as Emma Leroy
- Achille Potier as Julien Leroy
- Judith El Zein as Virginie
- Michaël Abiteboul as Paul
- Vanessa Guide as Marion
- Michel Vuillermoz as Coutine
- Anne Le Ny as The judge
- Yves Verhoeven as Henri
- Sloan-Perry Ambassa as The Hostess
- Yannick Choirat as Xavier

== Box office ==
The film earned $3.85 million in its opening weekend in France.
