= Toc Toc =

2017 Spanish comedy movie directed by Vicente Villanueva

- Directed by: Vicente Villanueva
- Written by: Vicente Villanueva
- Based on: Toc Toc by Laurent Baffie
- Produced by: Mercedes Gamero; Mikel Lejarza; Gonzalo Salazar-Simpson
- Starring: Paco León; Alexandra Jiménez; Rossy de Palma; Oscar Martínez; Nuria Herrero; Adrián Lastra
- Cinematography: David Omedes
- Edited by: Alejandro Lázaro
- Music by: Antonio Escobar
- Production companies: Atresmedia Cine; La Zona; Lazonafilms; Wind Films
- Distributed by: Warner Bros. Pictures
- Release date: 6 October 2017 (Spain)
- Running time: 90 minutes
- Country: Spain
- Language: Spanish
- Box office: $7.2 million

Toc Toc is a 2017 Spanish comedy film directed by Vicente Villanueva, starring Rossy de Palma, Paco León, Inma Cuevas, Oscar Martínez, Alexandra Jiménez, Adrián Lastra and Ana Rujas and distributed by Warner Bros. Pictures The film portrays a group of patients with obsessive–compulsive disorder (OCD). The film's title is a play on words in Spanish, with toc being both the onomatopoeia for knocking and the abbreviation for OCD in Spanish (trastorno obsesivo compulsivo). It is the film adaptation of a French play by Laurent Baffie.

The film was shown during the summer of 2018 as part of the Cine de Verano in Seville, Spain.

The film is in Spanish with English subtitles.

== Plot ==
The opening shows five people who manifest OCD in various ways and one person who has Tourette syndrome. Blanca, who works in a research laboratory, has germ phobia and avoids touching people or surfaces. If unavoidable, she uses antibiotic wipes or washes her hands. Ana Maria has scrupulosity, with a compulsion to make the sign of the cross or touch an image of Jesus before leaving her house. She also has checking OCD, repeatedly checking the faucet, her keys, the stove, and so on, before leaving the house. Emilio, a taxi driver, is an arithmomaniac with compulsive hoarding, who crunches numbers, creeping out his fares with calculations such as the number of sperm a man expels in his lifetime. He also hoards junk to his wife's exasperation. Otto, obsessed with symmetry, reorganizes objects around him and avoids stepping on lines and cracks. Lili has echolalia and palilalia repeating phrases others say as well as her own. Federico has motor tics, copropraxia and coprolalia, making obscene gestures and uttering vulgar phrases.

Each thinks they have an appointment for a private session with Doctor Palomero, a famous psychologist, but arrives to find others have appointments at the same time and that the doctor is delayed. While gathered in the waiting room pending the doctor's arrival, they inevitably clash over each other's OCD manifestations, but must learn to tolerate each other. Blanca runs out of antibiotic wipes and is constantly retreating to the restroom to wash when someone brushes against her or she must touch an object someone else has touched. Blanca and Federico are the first to arrive, and she is alarmed when he shouts obscene phrases at her, believing Frederico is about to assault her. Emilio arrives to intervene, and Frederico explains his Tourette syndrome, but Emilio becomes a nuisance himself when he mocks Ana Maria, counting the excessive number of times she must cross herself in reaction to Frederico's obscenities. Emilio also grows irritated by Lili's incessant parroting of everything everyone says to her. Otto will not walk on the striped patterned carpet without placing magazines under his feet or climbing over furniture to avoid stepping on lines. Otto (whose name is a palindrome) finds Lili's echolalia fascinating, since it appeals to his passion for symmetry.

As the waiting time grows long, each finally realizes that they annoy the others as much as the others irritate them. They begin to suggest ways to each other to deal with their obsessions and to tolerate the quirks of others. Looking back over the past hour they can cite examples where each of them briefly has forgotten their OCD boundaries to respond to a "crisis", such as when Blanca touched Ana Maria to loosen her clothes when she hyperventilated and Blanca did not immediately wash her hands.

When the receptionist informs them that the doctor's delayed flight has landed but that it will take him a half hour or so to arrive from the airport, they decide not to wait for him, as they have essentially created their own group therapy session. All the patients feel they have briefly overcome their compulsions by not fixating on themselves and can build on that success. They agree to meet once a week on their own to continue working together. Lili and Otto decide to continue getting to know each other that evening. Ana Maria asks Frederico over for dinner next week; he accepts her invitation. Emilio offers each of them a ride back home in his taxi (where he finds he has left his last fare locked in the taxi the whole time), but Frederico declines, saying he lives close by and will walk home.

Frederico returns to the office, where he informs the receptionist that she has done a good job keeping the ruse going and offers her the receptionist job permanently. She assures him that she has already set up the session for next week with a new group of patients. Frederico is Doctor Palomero, who uses the pro bono ruse as a way to camouflage his Tourette syndrome while setting up OCD patients in self-supporting therapy groups. As the credits roll, each of the patients is making progress as they live their lives.

== Cast ==
- Paco León as Emilio
- Alexandra Jiménez as Blanca
- Rossy de Palma as Ana María
- Oscar Martínez as Federico
- Nuria Herrero as Lili
- Adrián Lastra as Otto
- Inma Cuevas as Tiffany
- Ana Rujas as Natalia
- Carolina Lapausa as Rocío
- Iván Cózar as Marcial
- Lita Terán as Limpiadora
- Verónica Forqué as Paciente nuevo grupo #1
- Miguel Rellán as Paciente nuevo grupo #2
- Bárbara Santa-Cruz as Paciente nuevo grupo #3
- Daniel Grao as Paciente nuevo grupo #4
- Arturo Valls as Paciente nuevo grupo #5
- Marta Hazas as Paciente nuevo grupo #6
