= Eiffel (film) =

2021 French romantic drama film

- French theatrical release poster
- Directed by: Martin Bourboulon
- Screenplay by: Caroline Bongrand
- Produced by: Vanessa van Zuylen
- Starring: Romain Duris; Emma Mackey; Pierre Deladonchamps
- Cinematography: Matias Boucard
- Edited by: Virginie Bruant; Valérie Deseine
- Music by: Alexandre Desplat
- Production companies: VVZ Production; Pathé Films
- Distributed by: Pathé Distribution
- Release dates: 2 March 2021 (Alliance Française French Film Festival); 13 October 2021 (France)
- Running time: 108 minutes
- Country: France
- Language: French
- Budget: $25.2 million
- Box office: $13.6 million

Eiffel is a 2021 French romantic drama film directed by Martin Bourboulon, from a script written by Caroline Bongrand. The film stars Romain Duris as Gustave Eiffel and follows a fictionalized romance between Eiffel and Adrienne Bourgès, his childhood sweetheart, played by Emma Mackey. It also stars Pierre Deladonchamps in a supporting role.

Eiffel premiered on 2 March 2021 at the Alliance Française French Film Festival in Australia, and was released in France on 13 October 2021, by Pathé Distribution. The film received mostly positive reviews, and grossed $13.6 million worldwide.

== Plot ==
31 March 1889 – Gustave Eiffel sits in his office, atop the newly completed thousand-foot (300 metre) iron tower he has designed and constructed – the Eiffel Tower.

September 1886 – Eiffel receives an award for his groundbreaking design for an iron skeleton to support the Statue of Liberty. Afterward, he considers what his next construction should be, for the 1889 World’s Fair in Paris. Two of his employees, Maurice Koechlin and Émile Nouguier, propose a 200 metre (656 feet) steel tower, but he turns down their proposal, favouring a Metro system for Paris. In order to get publicity for his enterprise, he contacts an old friend, journalist Antoine de Restac. At a society party, Eiffel meets Restac’s wife, Adrienne. They have a strange, instant connection. Transfixed by her, Eiffel suddenly announces he will build a 300 metre steel tower, shocking the other guests.

Bordeaux, 1860 – while building an iron bridge over the treacherous River Garonne, Eiffel dives in to rescue a construction worker who fell into the river. Eiffel demands wood for safety scaffolding from his superiors, but his request is turned down. Eiffel goes to Bourgès, a wealthy local businessman, to ask for the wood. Eiffel meets Adrienne, Bourgès’ headstrong daughter. Impressed by having secretly witnessed Eiffel’s heroism on the bridge, she speaks up in defence of his request for the wood and secures it for him. Adrienne invites Eiffel to her birthday party. At the party he is awkward, but she finds his aloofness attractive. He kisses her, then storms off, embarrassed. She shows up later at his office, saying she is attracted to him. Eiffel does not believe her and sends her away, so she throws herself into the river, to spite him. He rescues her and they make love and begin a passionate affair.

1886 – Eiffel presents his plans for the tower to the judges for the competition. At the ceremony to announce the winner, as his name is announced, Eiffel and Adrienne instinctively hold hands; Restac sees this. Eiffel begins construction of the tower. At a garden party, he dances with Adrienne and asks her to meet him at a cheap hotel in the country, and she refuses. As construction continues, the workers threaten to strike. Adrienne realises Restac has become suspicious of her. She searches his belongings and finds a cartoon belittling Eiffel’s tower. Out of jealousy, Restac is using his position as a top journalist to sabotage public opinion against the tower. Restac subtly warns Eiffel about this. With uncertainty clouding the whole undertaking, the workers at the tower go on strike.

Bordeaux, 1860 – Eiffel learns Adrienne has left town and runs to her house, where her father tells Eiffel she was just stringing him along him, and that she never wants to see him again.

1886 – Adrienne shows up at the cheap hotel. She reveals to Eiffel that the reason she left him 26 years ago was that she was pregnant with his child, and her parents forbade her to marry Eiffel, or ever see him again. She raced from the house to be with him, but as she tried to escape over the fence, she fell and was impaled on a spike, losing the baby and almost dying. Eiffel realises Adrienne has always loved him and they make love. When the banks threaten to pull funding for the tower, Eiffel finances the tower with his own fortune. Seeing Eiffel is betting everything on the tower, the workers cease their strike. Adrienne visits the completed first level and she and Eiffel kiss above the rooftops of Paris.

Restac, who married Adrienne and nursed her back to health after her family abandoned her, is aware of her affair with Eiffel. He tells her he will ruin Eiffel’s reputation and destroy the tower’s chances of completion if she doesn’t end the affair. Adrienne tells Eiffel she has agreed to leave the city with Restac, to protect Eiffel and his tower.

Furious and powerless, Eiffel orders the tower’s construction to be completed with rivets instead of bolts, so it can never be torn down. He pushes his team to exhaustion and finishes the tower in time for the World’s Fair. At the grand opening, Eiffel sees Adrienne in the crowd. After they briefly make eye contact, she leaves, knowing she has sacrificed everything so his masterpiece can be completed.

Returning to the opening scene, Eiffel writes in his journal in his office atop the tower. He sketches atop a diagram of the tower, adding letters beside it, to form the name Adrienne. It suddenly becomes apparent that the tower is in the shape of the capital letter “A”. Eiffel has made the tower a permanent monument to their love. He walks out and surveys the city, which sprawls beneath him.

== Cast ==
- Romain Duris as Gustave Eiffel
- Emma Mackey as Adrienne Bourgès
- Pierre Deladonchamps as Antoine de Restac
- Armande Boulanger as Claire Eiffel
- Bruno Raffaelli as M. Bourgès
- Alexandre Steiger as Jean Compagnon
- Andranic Manet as Adolphe Salles
- Philippe Hérisson as Édouard Lockroy
- Stéphane Boucher as Pauwels
- Jérémy Lopez as Maurice Koechlin
- Damien Zanoly as Émile Nouguier
- Sophie Fougère as Mme Bourgès
- Joseph Rezwin as R. Milligan McLane (as Joe Rezwin)
- Jérémie Petrus as Edmond
- Hervé Masquelier as Un banquier
- Benoît de Gaulejac as Un banquier
- Clémence Boué as Madame Lockroy
- Dominique Pozzetto as L'huissier du ministère
- Philippe Saïd as Membre du conseil
- Philippe Richardin as Membre du conseil
- David Olivier Fischer as Le Président de la République
- Frédéric Merlo as Georges
- Catherine Giron as Invitée Bourgès 1
- Stéphane Page as Invité Bourgès 2
- David Grolleau as Paulo
- Christian Loustau as Officiel inauguration
- Fabien de Chavanes as Ouvrier chantier tour
- Denis Leluc as Huissier Conseil de Paris
- Thierry Nenez as Dessinateur 1
- David Sevier as Dessinateur 2
- Vincent Combe as Membre du Conseil
- Juliette Blanche as Amie Adrienne

== Reception ==
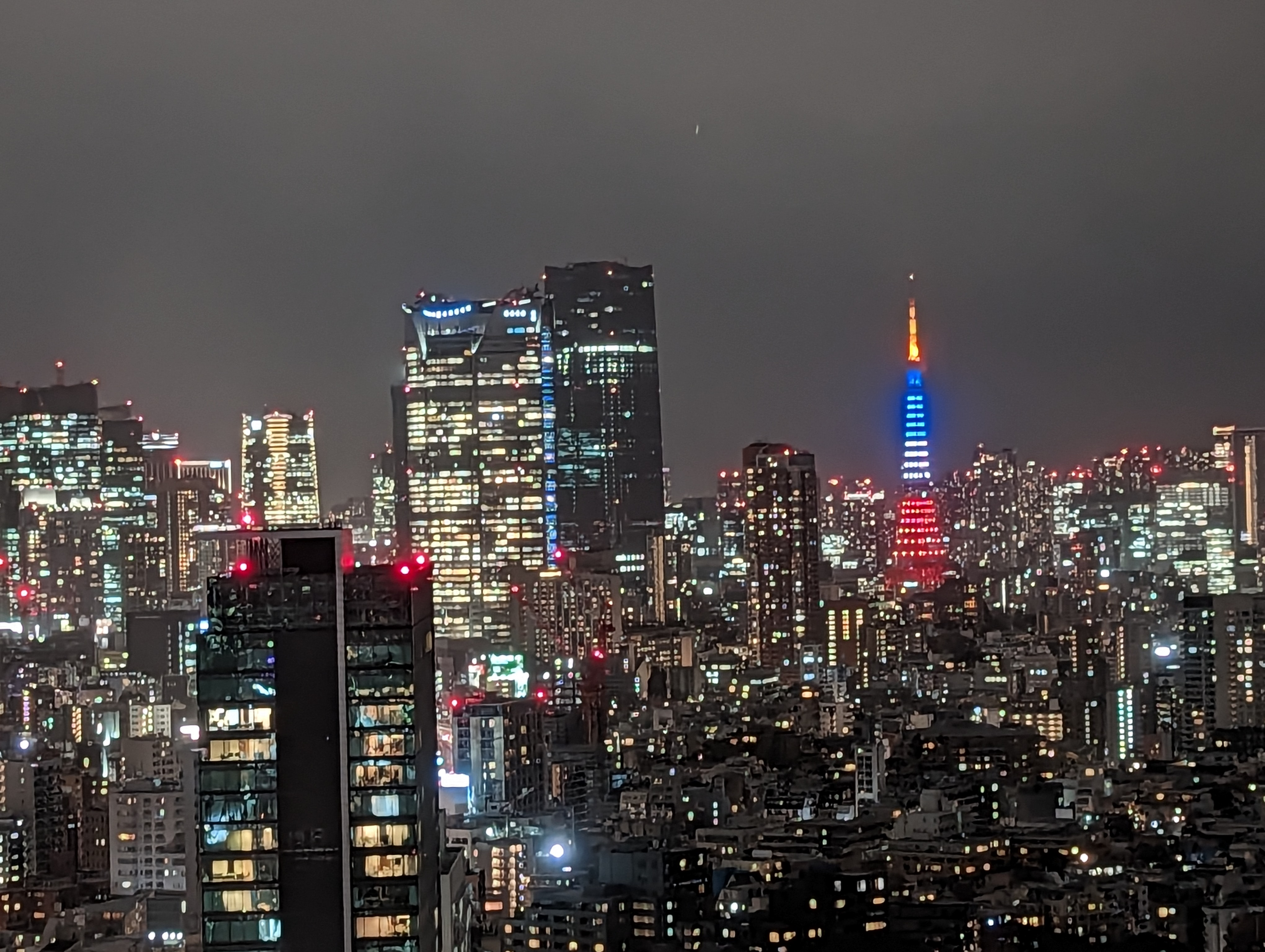
Tricolore Tokyo Tower to celebrate the release of the movie

Peter Debruge of Variety wrote that "Not a biopic so much as a sketchy piece of historical fiction, Eiffel identifies itself as 'librement inspiré de faits réels,' which roughly translates to 'a made-up crock of hooey'." David Stratton of The Australian wrote that "I am a man with an idea greater than himself, Eiffel tells the various interested parties when he makes his formal bid to build the tower. I think the director of this film took that line to heart, and I am glad he did". Nesselson of Screen International wrote that "Ambitious, handsomely appointed and unapologetically old-fashioned".
