= Dora Postigo =

Spanish singer (born 2004)

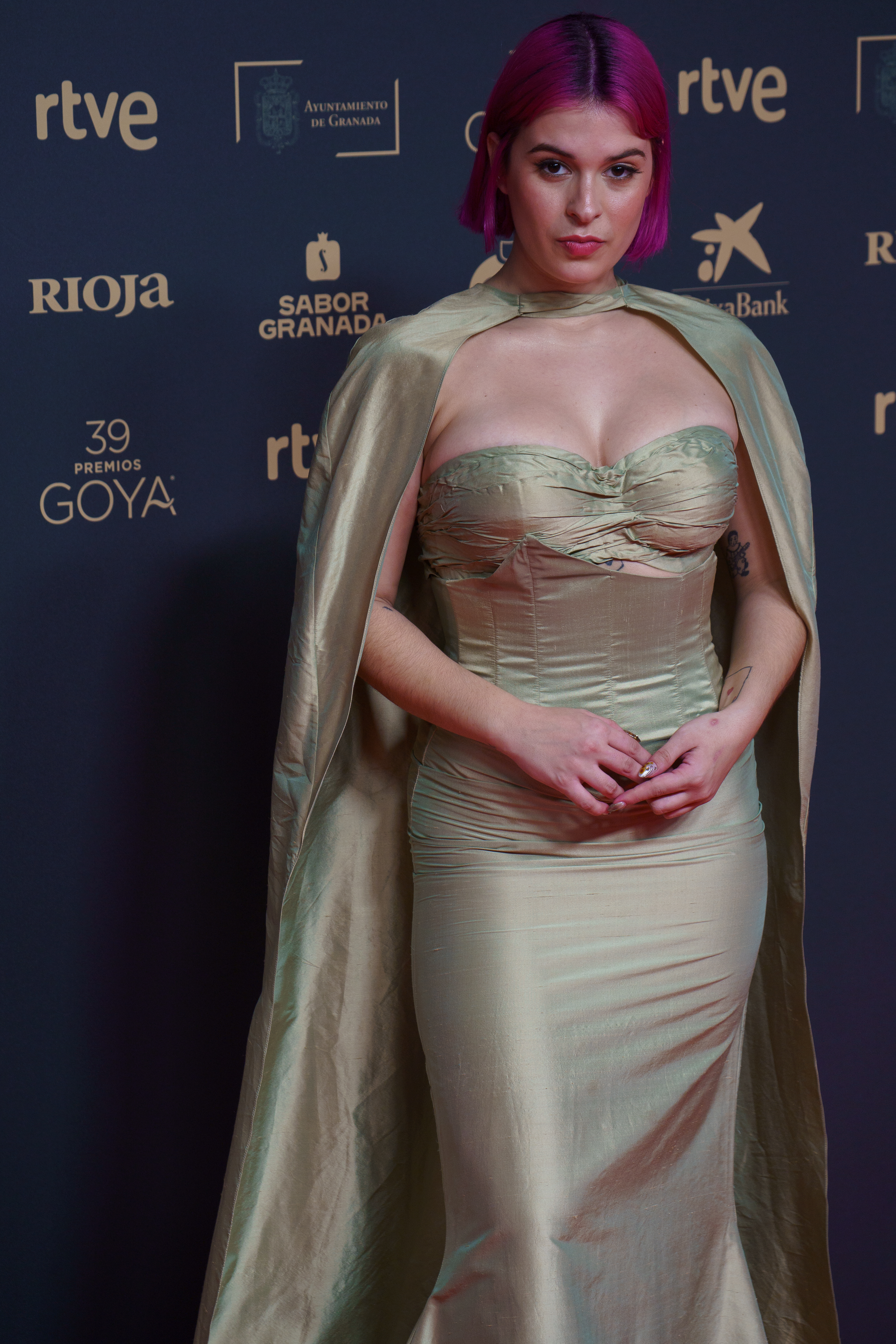
- Postigo in 2025
- Born: Dora Postigo Salvatore; 9 April 2004 (age 22); Madrid, Spain
- Occupations: Singer; actress; model
- Mother: Bimba Bosé
- Relatives: Miguel Bosé (great-uncle); Lucía Bosè (great-grandmother); Luis Miguel Dominguín (great-grandfather); Domingo Dominguín (great-great-grandfather)

Dora Postigo Salvatore (born April 9, 2004) is a Spanish actress, model and singer.

== Biography ==
She was born on April 9 2004 in Madrid to the model Bimba Bosé and the musician and filmmaker Diego Postigo. Postigo is of maternal Italian descent. She is the great-granddaughter, on her mother's side, of the actress Lucía Bosè and the bullfighter Luis Miguel Dominguín, as well as the great-niece of Miguel Bosé. She has a sister, born in 2011.

== Professional career ==
She started playing the piano at the age of five, and by the age of nine she was creating her own versions of songs by Ella Fitzgerald and Kendrick Lamar. She started uploading videos to YouTube two years later. She became vocalist for La Creativa Junior Big Band a year later.

She performed her first concert, in the company of her father and sister, in 2017. She began composing her own songs at the age of 13, capturing the attention of producer Pional, who helped her produce her first album. In 2019, she released her first single to the market titled Saving Star which was streamed almost two million times on Spotify. Months later, she released the single Call Me Back, which has been streamed more than seven million times on the same platform. In 2020, she released the single Ojos de serpiente on the television program Operación Triunfo, composed by herself and whose video clip was directed by Paco León. In March 2021, she released the songs Quiéreme and La Bestia, months later, together with Delaporte.

In November 2018, she debuted as a model for David Delfín's label.

Three years later, her acting debut was also announced, with a starring role as Dora in Rainbow, directed by Paco León.

In 2026, Dora participated in Benidorm Fest 2026 with Marlon Collins. The song, Rakata, scored 61 points in the semifinal and is described as a blend of ballad, cumbia, reggaeton, and electronic sounds.

== Discography ==
- «Saving Star» (2019)
- «Call Me Back» (2019)
- «Home» (2019)
- «Ojos de serpiente» (2020)
- «Stay» (2020)
- «Hoy» (2020)
- «Oxena» (2020)
- «Quiéreme» (2021)
- «La Bestia» ft. Delaporte (2021)

== Filmography ==
=== Cinema ===
Year	Title	Character	Directed by	Role
2022	Rainbow	Dora	Paco León	Protagonist

=== Television ===
Programs and reality shows
Year	Title	Channel	Notes
2016	Levántate All Stars	Telecinco	Guest artist
2018	Alaska y Mario	MTV	Guest
2020	Operación Triunfo	TVE	Guest artist
2020	La resistencia	Movistar+	Guest
