= Yolanda Alzola =

Spanish actress and television presenter (born 1970)

Yolanda Alzola (born 3 November 1970) is a Spanish actress and television presenter from Guernica, Vizcaya. She presents the Decogarden program on Canal Nova. She has appeared in television series such as Galakthica, Lo que faltaba, A plena luz, and Sabor a verano, and films such as Calor... y celos (1996), Carretera y manta (2000) and Reinas (2005).

== Biography ==
Born in Guernica on November 3, 1970. She has always lived in Durango. She is married and has three children.She has a degree in Fine Arts from the University of the Basque Country.

He has worked on several films and television series.
