= Diarios de la cuarentena =

- Genre: Sitcom
- Created by: Álvaro Longoria
- Directed by: Álvaro Longoria; Álvaro Fernández Armero
- Starring: Petra Martínez; Gorka Otxoa; Carlos Bardem; Carlos Areces; Cristina Alarcón
- Country of origin: Spain
- Original language: Spanish
- No. of seasons: 1
- No. of episodes: 8

Production
- Running time: 30 minutes
- Production company: RTVE

Original release
- Network: La 1
- Release: 7 April – 19 May 2020

Diarios de la cuarentena (Spanish: Quarantine diaries) is a Spanish comedy television series produced by RTVE that aired on La 1 from April 7 to May 20, 2020. It stars José Luis García Pérez, Petra Martínez, Carlos Bardem and Fernando Colomo, among others.

== Production ==
The series arose during the lockdown suffered in Spain due to COVID-19. Its production was announced on April 2, 2020.

Since the actors had to film the scenes from their homes, as they were under lockdown themselves, they were given a basic filming kit with mobile, tripod and microphone.

== Plot ==
It features the lives of several people during the lockdown, in a total of 10 different houses showing how they cope with this situation the best they can.

== Cast ==
- Cecilia Gessa
- Carlos Bardem
- Fernando Colomo - Fermín
- Carlos Areces - Richi
- Gorka Otxoa
- Adrià Collado
- Ana Alonso - Ana
- Montse Pla
- Víctor Clavijo - Víctor
- Mónica Regueiro
- Fele Martínez
- Cristina Alarcón
- José Luis García Pérez - José Luis
- Petra Martínez - Petra
- Juan Margallo - Juan
- Carmen Arrufat

== Reception ==
=== Ratings ===
The first episode was seen by 1,697,000 people (8,4% of the total viewers)

=== Critical response ===
The series sparked controversy even before its premiere. Some social network users called for a boycott due to considering it an unnecessary mockery of the more than 13,000 deaths by COVID-19 in Spain.

Deputy in the Assembly of Madrid Jaime de Berenguer (of the Vox party) harshly criticized the series calling it propaganda. TVE responded alleging that the series has a low cost and that it is not an unnecessary expense of money.

After the first episode was aired the critics of the professionals were varied; website Vertele praised the good technical production despite the difficult conditions in which it was made, but criticized that the characters do not reflect the diversity of Spanish society and the lack of interesting plots. The website Espinof called it a "harmless way of passing time".
