= Arde Madrid =

Spanish television series

- Official poster
- Genre: Comedy drama
- Created by: Paco León; Anna R. Costa
- Written by: Paco León; Anna R. Costa; Fernando Pérez
- Directed by: Paco León
- Starring: Paco León; Inma Cuesta; Debi Mazar; Anna Castillo
- Country of origin: Spain
- Original languages: Spanish (some dialogue in English)
- No. of seasons: 1
- No. of episodes: 8

Production
- Executive producer: Movistar+
- Running time: 30 minutes (approx.)

Original release
- Release: 8 November 2018

Arde Madrid is a Spanish period comedy-drama limited television series created by Paco León and Anna R. Costa, which premiered on November 8, 2018, on Movistar+. León also directed every episode of the series and stars in it, alongside Debi Mazar, Inma Cuesta and Anna Castillo. The series tells the story of the period which American actress Ava Gardner spent in Francoist Spain. On 14 November 2018, Movistar+ renewed the series for a second season, but on 3 May 2019, the creators announced their decision to not continue the series. The series premiered May 5, 2020 in the US and Canada on MHz Choice, a subsidiary of MHz Networks.

== Premise ==
Ava Gardner's life in Madrid in the 1960s is told from the point of view of her maid and chauffeur, both spies in Franco's secret service, who report on her hedonistic lifestyle, filled with an elite group of artists, aristocrats and expats.

== Cast ==
Main

- Inma Cuesta as Ana Mari, an instructor of the Sección Femenina (lame due to polio) entering to work as housekeeper at Ava's Gardner residence to report on the actress' activities by feigning a marriage with Manolo.
- Paco León as Manolo, a scoundrel who starts working as Ava Gardner's chauffeur.
- Debi Mazar as Ava Gardner
- Anna Castillo as Pilar
- Julián Villagrán as Floren, Ana Mari's brother who has schizophrenia.
- Ken Appledorn as Bill Gallagher, Ava Gardner's secretary
- Osmar Nuñez as Juan Perón
- Fabiana García Lago as Isabel Perón

Other and cameos

- Miren Ibarguren as Lucero
- Moreno Borja as Vargas.
- Manuel Manquiña as Joyero.
- María Hervás
- Carmen Machi, as Francoist officer
- Fanny Gautier as Aline Griffith
- Fernando Andina as Luis de Figueroa (Luis Quintanilla)
- Craig Stevenson as Samuel Bronston
- Melody as Carmen Sevilla
- Mariola Fuentes as Lola Flores
- Eugenia Martínez de Irujo as the Duchess of Alba
- Pol Vaquero as Antonio González, el Pescaílla
- María Ordóñez as Lucía Bosé
- Helena Dueñas as Rosario, maid working at the Perón's apartment
- Carmina Barrios as Virginia García Moreno, "la Sansona del siglo XX"
- Silvia Tortosa
- Elena Furiase as the Flores' family nanny
- Cristina Alarcón as Carmen Cervera
- Rebeca Lutu as Marisol
- Raquel Infante as Marujita Díaz
- Michel Ruben as Frank Sinatra (voice only)

== Episodes ==
No.	Title	Directed by
1	"Poco católica"	Paco León
2	"I love mojama"	Paco León
3	"Puta paya"	Paco León
4	"Directo fiesta"	Paco León
5	"Muy americana"	Paco León
6	"Más flores que a la virgen"	Paco León
7	"Dios es Dios y yo soy yo"	Paco León
8	"What's autorización?"	Paco León

== Accolades ==
Year	Award	Category	Nominee(s)	Result	Ref.
2019	6th Feroz Awards	Best Comedy Series		Won	
2019	6th Feroz Awards	Best Lead Actor in TV	Paco León	Nominated	
2019	6th Feroz Awards	Best Lead Actress in TV	Inma Cuesta	Won	
2019	6th Feroz Awards	Best Supporting Actress in TV	Anna Castillo	Won	
2019	6th Feroz Awards	Best Supporting Actress in TV	Fabiana García	Nominated	
2019	6th Feroz Awards	Best Supporting Actress in TV	Debi Mazar	Nominated	
2019	6th Feroz Awards	Best Supporting Actor in TV	Julián Villagrán	Nominated	
2019	28th Actors and Actresses Union Awards	Best Television Actress in a Leading Role	Inma Cuesta	Won	
2019	28th Actors and Actresses Union Awards	Best Television Actress in a Secondary Role	Anna Castillo	Won	
2019	28th Actors and Actresses Union Awards	Best Television Actress in a Minor Role	Miren Ibarguren	Won	
2019	28th Actors and Actresses Union Awards	Best Television Actor in a Minor Role	Julián Villagrán	Won	
2019	6th Platino Awards	Best Iberoamerican Miniseries or TV Series		Won	
2019	66th Ondas Awards	Best Spanish Series		Won	
2019	21st Iris Awards	Best Fiction		Nominated	
2019	21st Iris Awards	Best Actress	Inma Cuesta	Nominated	
2019	Rose d'Or	Best Comedy Drama and Sitcom		Won	
2019	7th MiM Series Awards	Best Comedy Series		Won	
2019	7th MiM Series Awards	Best Comedy Actress	Anna Castillo	Nominated	
2019	7th MiM Series Awards	Best Comedy Actor	Paco León	Nominated	
2019	7th MiM Series Awards	Best Direction	Paco León	Nominated	
2019	7th MiM Series Awards	Best Screenplay	Paco León & Anna R. Costa	Nominated	
