= Blowing Kisses =

Spanish television miniseries

- Spanish: Besos al aire
- Genre: Romantic comedy; Comedy drama
- Created by: Aitor Gabilondo
- Written by: Darío Madrona
- Directed by: Iñaki Mercero
- Starring: Paco León; Leonor Watling; Nuria Herrero; José Ángel Egido; Gloria Muñoz; Zoe Stein; Nancho Novo; Gracia Olayo; María León; David Castillo; Mariam Hernández; Jaime Olías; Loreto Mauleón
- Country of origin: Spain
- Original language: Spanish
- No. of episodes: 2

Production
- Running time: 78–80 minutes
- Production companies: Mediaset España; Alea Media

Original release
- Network: Star
- Release: 26 March – 2 April 2021

Blowing Kisses (Spanish: Besos al aire) is a Spanish television miniseries created by Aitor Gabilondo, written by Darío Madrona and directed by Iñaki Mercero. The two-part miniseries was released as a Star Original on Star via Disney+ on 26 March 2021 in Spain. In the UK and Ireland, the series premiered on Disney+ on 11 August 2021.

== Premise ==
Featuring the COVID-19 pandemic as backdrop, the fiction (presented as "romantic comedy" or "comedy drama") follows a number of initially unrelated love stories developed during the lockdown.

Part of the fiction happens in the same fictional hospital (Los Arcos) the Madres series is set.

== Cast ==
- Paco León as Javi
- Leonor Watling as Dr. Cabanas
- Nuria Herrero as Berta
- José Ángel Egido as Fidel
- Gloria Muñoz as Dolores
- Zoe Stein as Celeste
- Nancho Novo as Pedro
- Gracia Olayo as Diana
- María León as Nines
- David Castillo as Nacho
- Mariam Hernández as Luisa
- Jaime Olías as Claudio
- Loreto Mauleón as Elena

== Release ==
Series	Episodes	Originally released			Ref.
Series	Episodes	First released	Last released	Network	Ref.
1	2	26 March 2021	2 April 2021	Star	

== Production ==
Created by Aitor Gabilondo, written by Darío Madrona and directed by Iñaki Mercero, Blowing Kisses was produced by Mediaset España in collaboration with Alea Media, with Mediterráneo Mediaset España Group as distributor. The miniseries, consisting of two 80 minute long episodes, premiered on Disney+'s Star on 26 March 2021, with the second part scheduled for 2 April 2021. The platform was given a 9-month-long exclusivity on the content.
