= B&b, de boca en boca =

- Genre: Comedy drama
- Created by: Daniel Écija
- Starring: Belén Rueda; Gonzalo de Castro; Carlos Iglesias; Dani Rovira; Macarena García; Fran Perea
- Country of origin: Spain
- Original language: Spanish
- No. of seasons: 2
- No. of episodes: 29

Production
- Production company: Globomedia

Original release
- Network: Telecinco
- Release: 17 February 2014 – 30 December 2015

B&b, de boca en boca is a Spanish workplace comedy-drama television series created by Daniel Écija that originally aired from February 2014 to December 2015 on Telecinco. It stars Belén Rueda, Gonzalo de Castro, Carlos Iglesias, Dani Rovira, Macarena García, Fran Perea and Andrés Velencoso, among others.

== Premise ==
The fiction, a dramedy, is centered on the work taking place in a fashion magazine.

== Cast ==
- Belén Rueda as Candela.
- Gonzalo de Castro as Pablo.
- Macarena García as Sonia.
- Carlos Iglesias as César.
- Dani Rovira as Juan.
- Luisa Martín as Carmen.
- Fran Perea as Mario.
- Neus Sanz as Susana.
- Paula Prendes as Martina.
- Adolfo Fernández as Óscar Bornay.
- Cristina Brondo as Vero.
- Cristina Alarcón as Clara.
- Jorge Usón as Lucas.
- Sara Sálamo as Caye.
- César Mateo as Hugo.
- Puchi Lagarde as Tita.
- Andrés Velencoso as Rubén Barahona.
- Juan Carlos Librado, "Nene" as Julián.

Introduced in season 2

- Cristóbal Suárez as Cristóbal.
- Elena Ballesteros as Maite.

== Production and release ==
Created by Daniel Écija, Écija was also credited as executive producer. Produced by Globomedia, production began filming by September 2013. The series debuted on Telecinco on 17 February 2014, facing Velvet as prime time rival. The last episode of the first season aired on 11 June 2014. 15 months later, the series returned on 16 September 2015 with a new season. Receiving a waning interest from the audience, the broadcasting run ended on 30 December 2015; the season finale earned the lowest share throughout the series (9.5%).

Series	Episodes	Originally released			Viewers	Share (%)	Ref.
Series	Episodes	First released	Last released	Network	Viewers	Share (%)	Ref.
1	16	17 February 2014	11 June 2014	Telecinco	2,602,000	14.3	
2	13	16 September 2015	30 December 2015	Telecinco	1,999,000	12.4	

== Awards and nominations ==
Year	Award	Category	Nominee(s)	Result	Ref.
2015	55th Monte-Carlo Television Festival	Best Comedy Actress	Belén Rueda	Won	
