= Rainbow (2022 film) =

2022 film by Paco León

- Official release poster
- Directed by: Paco León
- Written by: Javier Gullón; Paco León
- Produced by: Sandra Hermida; Paco León; Álvaro Augustín; Ghislain Barrois
- Starring: Dora Postigo; Ayax Pedrosa; Wekaforé Jibril; Carmen Machi; Carmen Maura; Luis Bermejo
- Cinematography: Marc Miró
- Edited by: Ana Álvarez-Ossorio
- Production companies: Telecinco Cinema; Los amigos de Dorothy AIE; Andy Joke; Colosé Producciones
- Distributed by: Netflix
- Release dates: 18 September 2022 (SSIFF); 23 September 2022 (Spain)
- Running time: 118 minutes
- Country: Spain
- Language: Spanish

Rainbow is a 2022 Spanish fantasy drama film directed by Paco León, loosely based on L. Frank Baum's 1900 novel The Wonderful Wizard of Oz. The film stars Dora Postigo, Áyax Pedrosa, Wekaforé Jibril (Spirit Disco), Carmen Maura, Carmen Machi and Luis Bermejo.

The film premiered at the 70th San Sebastián International Film Festival on 18 September 2022. It later received a release in select theatres in Spain on 23 September 2022, and a streaming debut on Netflix on 30 September.

== Premise ==
The film, "not a musical film" but featuring "a lot of music" according to Paco León, follows the coming-of-age story of a teenager with an extraordinary musical talent (Dora) leaving home alongside her dog Toto upon a quarrel with her father Diego, embarking on a journey to 'Ciudad Capital'.

== Cast ==
- Dora Postigo as Dora
- Ayax Pedrosa as Muñeco
- Wekaforé Jibril as Akin
- Carmen Maura as Coco Cabrera
- Carmen Machi as Maribel
- Luis Bermejo as José Luis
- Hovik Keuchkerian as Diego
- Rossy de Palma
- Ester Expósito
- Samantha Hudson
- Carmina Barrios
- Soraya Yasmin
- Debi Mazar
- Palomo Spain

== Production ==
Rainbow is inspired on L. Frank Baum's The Wonderful Wizard of Oz. Paco León co-wrote the screenplay alongside Javier Gullón, and is also credited as producer. Produced by Telecinco Cinema in collaboration with Los amigos de Dorothy AIE, and the participation of Andy Joke and Colosé Producciones, filming began on 2 August 2021. Shooting locations included the Madrid region and the provinces of Segovia, Guadalajara, Toledo and Alicante. Netflix reported the wrap in October 2021. Other crew duties were entrusted to Marc Miró (cinematography), and Ana Álvarez-Ossorio (editing), whereas Diego Postigo helmed the coordination of the musical production.

== Release ==
The film had its world premiere at the 70th San Sebastián International Film Festival's 'Velodrome' section on 18 September 2022. It was released in select theatres on 23 September 2022, followed by a worldwide release on Netflix streaming on 30 September 2022.

== Reception ==
Fernando Bernal of Cinemanía rated the film 1 out of 5 stars, writing that León's "road movie never manages to pick up speed" and its sequences "falter within their own rhythm".

Elsa Fernández-Santos of El País wrote about a film "capable of both the best and the worst", featuring an awry catharsis somewhat amended by a beautiful epilogue, resulting into an "uneven and largely botched film", even if having the courage to look to the future".

Raquel Hernández Luján of HobbyConsolas scored 40 out of 100 points ("bad"), deeming it to be an "immature and pretentious" proposal, with "clumsy" metaphors, and a final party that ends up becoming "irritating".

John Serba of Decider.com considered that the film "boasts enough compelling and creative pieces and parts to merit a recommendation, even if they don't quite come together as a whole".

== Accolades ==
Year	Award	Category	Nominee(s)	Result	Ref.
2023	2nd Carmen Awards	Best Adapted Screenplay	Paco León, Javier Gullón	Nominated	
2023	2nd Carmen Awards	Best New Actor	Ayax Pedrosa	Nominated	

== See also ==
- List of Spanish films of 2022
