= Miren Ibarguren =

Spanish actress (born 1980)

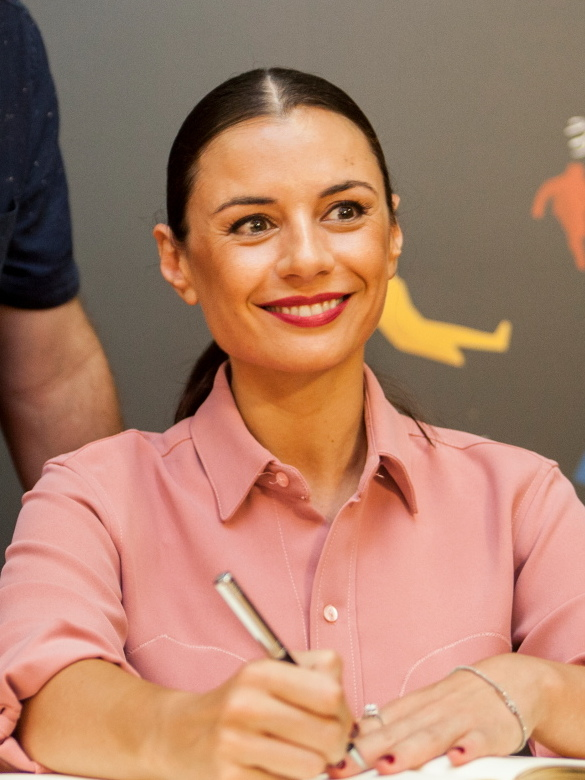
- Ibarguren on 21 September 2016
- Born: Miren Ibarguren Agudo; 23 May 1980 (age 46); San Sebastián, Spain
- Occupation: Actress
- Years active: 2003–present
- Partner: Alberto Caballero (2013–present)

Miren Ibarguren Agudo (born 23 May 1980) is a Spanish actress, mostly known for her comedy roles.

== Biography ==
Miren Ibarguren Agudo was born on 23 May 1980 in San Sebastián, Gipuzkoa. She started in the Euskal Telebista soap opera Goenkale. She made her feature film debut with the role of JSU member Joaquina López in the 2007 period drama 13 Roses. She is very popular because of her roles in comedy television series such as Escenas de Matrimonio and Aída.

Since 2013, she has been dating Alberto Caballero.

== Filmography ==
=== Movies ===
Year	Film	Role	Ref.
2007	Las 13 rosas (13 Roses)	Joaquina López	
2010	¿Estás ahí? (Are you there?)	Ana	
2010	Una hora más en Canarias (With or Without Love)	Elena	
2017	Fe de etarras (Bomb Scared)	Ainara	
2021	Operación Camarón (Undercover Wedding Crashers)	Pepa	
2021	Mamá o papá (You Keep the Kids!)	Flora	
2022	El test (The Te$t)	Paula	
2023	Matusalén	Amaia	
2026	Aída y vuelta (Aida, the Movie)	Herself / Soraya García García	

=== Television ===
Year(s)	Title	Role	Notes	Ref.
2003	Goenkale	Maria Luisa's maid	1 season	
2004–06	Aquí no hay quien viva		2 episodes	
2005–06	A tortas con la vida	Paula	23 episodes	
2007–08	Escenas de matrimonio	Sonia Valcárcel		
2008–14	Aída	Soraya García García		
2015	Anclados	Marga Santaella		
2016–	La que se avecina	Yolanda Morcillo	Main. Introduced in season 9	
2018	Arde Madrid	Lucero		
2021	Supernormal	Patricia Picón		
2022	Todos mienten	Maite		
2025	Billionaires' Bunker	Minerva		

=== Theatre ===
Year	Play	Director
2009	Mi primera vez	Gabriel Olivares

== Accolades ==
Year	Award	Category	Work	Result	Ref.
2019	28th Actors and Actresses Union Awards	Best Television Actress in a Minor Role	Arde Madrid	Won	
