= The Tribe (2018 film) =

- Film poster
- Spanish: La Tribu
- Directed by: Fernando Colomo
- Written by: Fernando Colomo; Yolanda García Serrano
- Starring: Paco León; Carmen Machi; Maribel del Pino
- Production companies: MOD Producciones; Atresmedia Cine
- Distributed by: Hispano Foxfilm
- Release dates: February 27, 2018 (Monte-Carlo Comedy Film Festival); March 16, 2018 (Spain)
- Running time: 90 minutes
- Country: Spain
- Language: Spanish

The Tribe (Spanish: La Tribu) is a 2018 Spanish comedy film directed by Fernando Colomo and written by Fernando Colomo and Yolanda García Serrano. The film is a MOD Producciones and Atresmedia Cine production, and it had the participation of Movistar+.

== Premise ==
The Tribe revolves around how the human resources director of a massive corporation, Fidel García Ruiz (Paco León), becomes a viral sensation when he and an underling are caught on video having sex in his office. The video of the two of them being wheeled out of the office circulates, and becomes the basis of a mega-popular dance hit.

== Cast ==
- Paco León as Fidel García Ruiz
- Carmen Machi as Virginia
- Maribel del Pino as Maribel
- María José Sarrate as Eli
- Arlette Torres as Belén
- Maite Sandoval as Cati
- Marisol Aznar as Uge
- Luis Bermejo as Luciano
- Artur Busquets as Elton
- Manuel Huedo as Maikel
- Julián López as Juanjo
- Alfonso Lara as Israel
- Manel Fuentes as Presentador
- David Arnaiz as Chacho
- Eric Berman as Migue

== Release ==
Distributed by Hispano Foxfilm, The Tribe was theatrically released on March 16, 2018, in Spain.

== See also ==
- List of Spanish films of 2018
