= Marisol Ayuso =

Spanish actress

- Born: María Soledad Ayuso Domínguez; May 19, 1943 (age 83); Madrid, Spain
- Occupation: Actress
- Parents: Pedro Pablo Ayuso (father); Soledad Domínguez y Giraldés (mother)

María Soledad Ayuso Domínguez (born May 19, 1943, in Madrid) better known as Marisol Ayuso is a Spanish stage, movie and television actress.

== Personal life ==
Her father, Pedro Pablo Ayuso, was also an actor, and her mother, María Soledad Domínguez Giraldes, was an aristocrat (the granddaughter of the Viscount of Troncoso). She is also descendant of King Charles IV of Spain.

She has a daughter with the former director of the General Spanish Society of Authors (SGAE) who was the owner of the disco "Pachá" in the 1980s.

== Filmography ==
=== Movies ===
- Aventuras de Don Quijote. (1960)
- Darling (1961)
- Todos eran culpables (1962)
- Vampiresas 1931 (1962)
- El pecador y la bruja (1964)
- Operación cabaretera (1967)
- Una bruja sin escoba (1967)
- ¡Cómo está el servicio! (1968)
- Objetivo: bi-ki-ni (1968)
- Llaman de Jamaica, Mr. Ward (1968)
- Verano 70 (1969)
- Cuatro noches de boda (1969)
- Mi marido y sus complejos (1969)
- The Complete Idiot (1970)
- Yo soy una bellaca (1970)
- Aunque la hormona se vista de seda... (1971)
- Siete minutos para morir (1971)
- Lo verde empieza en los Pirineos (1973)
- Cómo matar a papá... sin hacerle daño (1975)
- Ésta que lo es... (1977)
- Loca por el circo (1982)
- Esto es un atraco (1987)
- Desmadre matrimonial (1987)
- La hora de los valientes (1998)

=== Television ===
- Estudio 1 (1967–1979)
- Fin de año con Lina Morgan (1992)
- Celeste... no es un color (1993)
- Hostal Royal Manzanares (1996–1998)
- Don Juan en Alcalá 2005 (2005)
- Aída (2005-2014, final de la serie)

== Sources and external links ==
- http://www.geneall.net/H/per_page.php?id=372731
- Marisol Ayuso at IMDb
