= David Castillo (actor) =

Spanish actor

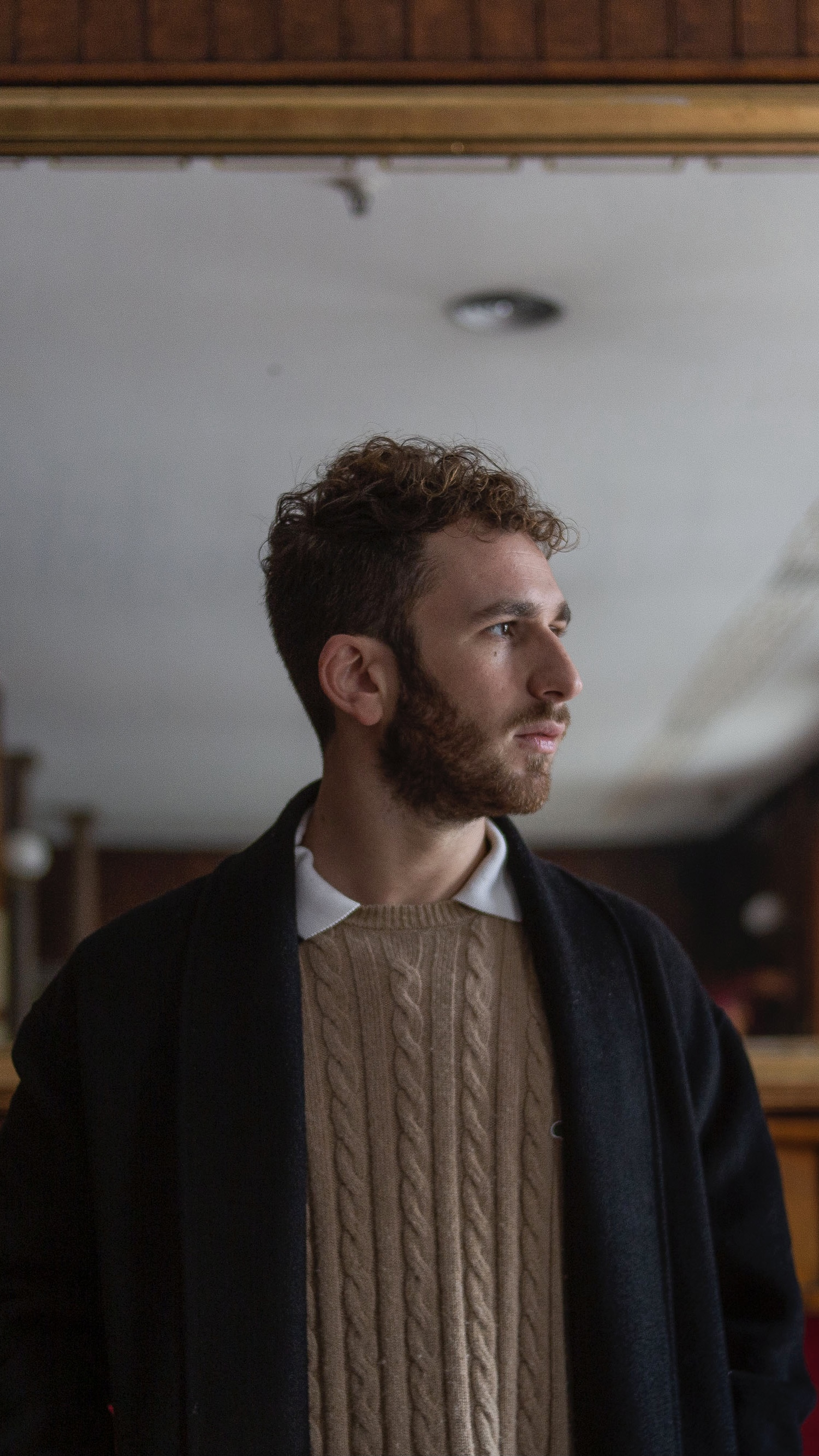
- (2020)
- Born: 1992 (age 33–34)
- Occupation: Actor

David Castillo Martínez (born 1992) is a Spanish actor. His breakout role bringing him popularity was his performance as Jonathan in the sitcom Aída, aired from 2005 to 2014.

== Biography ==
David Castillo Martínez was born in 1992 (depending on sources, either in Fuenlabrada or Madrid).

He began his acting career as a child and played lesser roles in series such as Hospital Central, Una nueva vida and Ana y los 7. David appeared in the 2004 gay-themed film Cachorro, playing Bernardo, a 9-year-old boy. He starred in the 2004 TV series Manolito Gafotas, playing Yihad, the antagonist of lead character Manolito Gafotas, played by Christopher Torres.

He joined the cast of Aída when he was 13 years old. He was cast to play Jonathan, the "troubling" son of leading character Aída (Carmen Machi). The successful series aired on Telecinco from 2005 to 2014, and earned Castillo (who starred in 237 episodes) popularity. Castillo starred in El diario de Carlota as 'Sergio' and played a cameo in Torrente 4 (2011), performing 'El chanclas'. Following the end of Aída, he temporarily distanced from television, and decided to take the entrance tests for the Joven Compañía Nacional de Teatro Clásico ("Young National Classical Theatre Company").

In 2018, he joined the cast of the 7th season of Amar es para siempre, playing a role very different to Aída's 'Jonathan', that of 'Miguel', a shy and introverted cartoonist. Castillo also starred in the war drama miniseries Los nuestros 2 (aired in 2019 on Telecinco), playing 'Ray Izquierdo', a corporal charged with the communications of the portrayed BRIPAC unit. He later took part in the medieval action drama El Cid, released on Amazon Prime Video in 2020, performing the role of the squire Lisardo. In October 2020, he joined the filming of the miniseries Besos al aire, set on the COVID-19 lockdown.

== Filmography ==
Television

Year	Title	Role	Notes	Ref.
2004	Manolito Gafotas	Yihad	13 episodes	
2005–2014	Aída	Jonathan	237 episodes	
2018	Amar es para siempre	Miguel Illarramendi		
2019	Los nuestros 2	Ray Izquierdo	TV miniseries	
2020	El Cid	Lisardo		
2021	Blowing Kisses	Nacho		

Film

Year	Title	Role	Notes	Ref.
2004	Cachorro	Bernardo		
2010	El diario de Carlota	Sergio		
2011	Torrente 4: Lethal Crisis	El chanclas	Cameo	
