= Martin Bourboulon =

French film director

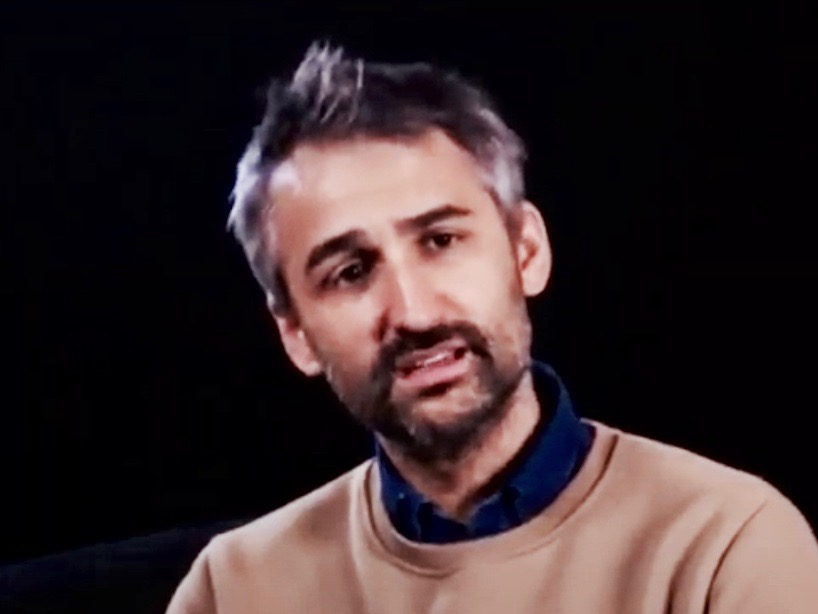
- Bourboulon in 2020
- Born: 27 June 1979 (age 47); France
- Occupations: Film director; screenwriter
- Years active: 1999–present

Martin Bourboulon (born 27 June 1979) is a French film director and screenwriter. He directed the films Daddy or Mommy (2015), Daddy or Mommy 2 (2016), Eiffel (2021), The Three Musketeers: D'Artagnan (2023) and The Three Musketeers: Milady (2023).

== Career ==
Son of film producer Frédéric Bourboulon, he started his career as an assistant director in films such as Pierre Jolivet's My Little Business (1999), Roland Joffé's Vatel (2000), Mathieu Kassovitz's The Crimson Rivers (2000), Bertrand Tavernier's Safe Conduct (2002), Jonathan Demme's The Truth About Charlie (2002), Jean-Paul Rappeneau's Bon Voyage (2003), Frédéric Auburtin's San-Antonio (2004), Thomas Vincent's The Hook (2004), and Jeanne Labrune's Cause toujours ! (2004).

Bourboulon made his directorial debut in 2003 with the short film Sale Hasard. In 2007, he directed his second short film, Emprise. He then directed feature films such as the comedy Daddy or Mommy (2015) and its sequel Daddy or Mommy 2 (2016), the romantic drama Eiffel (2021), and the epic adventure saga The Three Musketeers: D'Artagnan (2023) and The Three Musketeers: Milady (2023).

In June 2023, it was announced that Bourboulon will direct a television series for Apple TV+ titled Carême, about the world's first celebrity chef, Marie-Antoine Carême, starring Benjamin Voisin in the title role and also Jérémie Renier and Lyna Khoudri.

In December 2023, Bourboulon announced that he will direct the film 13 Days, 13 Nights, about the evacuation of Afghan civilians by French police during the fall of Kabul in 2021. Shooting is set to begin in spring 2024.

== Influences ==
Bourboulon has cited Time of the Gypsies (1989), Elephant (2003), The Things of Life (1970), Little Girl Blue (2023), and Les Bronzés (1978) as his favorite films.

== Filmography ==
=== Director ===
==== Feature films ====
- 2015: Daddy or Mommy
- 2016: Daddy or Mommy 2
- 2021: Eiffel
- 2023: The Three Musketeers: D'Artagnan
- 2023: The Three Musketeers: Milady
- 2025: 13 Days, 13 Nights

==== Short films ====
- 2003: Sale Hasard
- 2007: Emprise

=== Assistant director ===
- 1999: My Little Business by Pierre Jolivet
- 2000: Vatel by Roland Joffé
- 2000: The Crimson Rivers by Mathieu Kassovitz
- 2002: Safe Conduct by Bertrand Tavernier
- 2002: The Truth About Charlie by Jonathan Demme
- 2003: Bon Voyage by Jean-Paul Rappeneau
- 2004: San-Antonio by Frédéric Auburtin
- 2004: The Hook by Thomas Vincent
- 2004: Cause toujours ! by Jeanne Labrune

== Accolades ==
Year	Award	Category	Work	Result	Ref(s)
2015	L'Alpe d'Huez Film Festival	Audience Award – Best Film	Daddy or Mommy	Won	
