= Mariano Peña =

Spanish regular and voice actor (born 1960)

Peña in 2010

Mariano Peña García (born 7 April 1960) is a Spanish regular and voice actor. He is primarily known for his portrayal of Mauricio Colmenero in the comedy television series Aída, which gained him wide popularity and multiple accolades.

== Life and career ==
Mariano Peña García was born on 1 February 1960 in Manzanilla, province of Huelva. In 1975, he moved to Seville, where he studied both dramatic art and fine arts, becoming acquainted with stage acting and voice acting.

He made his screen debut in the short film La teoría del dinero (1991), and his big screen debut in Carlos contra el mundo (2003).

He achieved wide popularity for his role as Mauricio Colmenero, a stale bar owner, in 237 episodes of Aída, a spin-off of the sitcom 7 vidas. The character displayed an extremely reactionary and fascist nature, regularly exhibiting sexist, homophobic, and racist stances. After Aída's original run, he was a regular cast member of the comedy series Allí abajo, playing Don Benito Benjumea from 2015 to 2019.

He also joined the cast of biographical drama miniseries Ena to portray Miguel Primo de Rivera. In 2025 he featured in musical series Mariliendre, portraying the protagonist's deceased father.
