= Aída =

Spanish sitcom

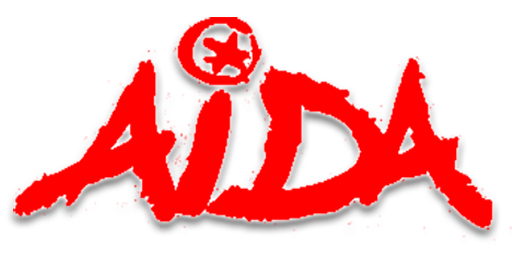
- Genre: Sitcom
- Created by: Nacho García Velilla
- Starring: Carmen Machi; Paco León; Mariano Peña; Melani Olivares; Pepe Viyuela; Miren Ibarguren; Dani Martínez; Eduardo Casanova; David Castillo; Ana María Polvorosa; Pepa Rus; Canco Rodríguez; Óscar Reyes; Secun de la Rosa; Marisol Ayuso
- Opening theme: "Que Nadie Me Levante La Voz" by Bebe
- Country of origin: Spain
- No. of seasons: 10
- No. of episodes: 237

Production
- Running time: 55–65 minutes

Original release
- Network: Telecinco
- Release: 16 January 2005 – 8 June 2014

Related
- 7 vidas

Aída is a Spanish sitcom that aired on Telecinco from 16 January 2005 to 8 June 2014. Set in Madrid, it is a spin off of the sitcom 7 Vidas, on which Aída was a recurring character. It was produced by Globomedia.

The show stars Carmen Machi as Aída García, a working single mother with two teenage children who is forced to move in with her mother Eugenia, played by Marisol Ayuso, and brother Luisma, played by Paco León, to make ends meet.

The show received favorable reviews and was the most-viewed show in Spain from 2007 until the end of its run. It has also received several awards, including the Ondas Award for Best Spanish Sitcom.

The Polish remake of the series began airing in March 2012 on the TVP2 channel.

== Synopsis ==
The series begins when Aída García, a divorced, ex-alcoholic and uneducated cleaning worker, returns to her lifelong working-class neighborhood, Esperanza Sur, when her recently deceased father leaves her the family home as an inheritance. Aída settles in the home with her two children, Lorena and Jonathan, and must also share it with her mother Eugenia, a former magazine star, and her brother Luisma, a former drug addict. There she meets up with old acquaintances, such as Paz Bermejo, her neighbor, who is now a prostitute, Mauricio Colmenero, owner of Bar Reinols, or Chema Martínez, who runs a grocery store and lives with his son Fidel. During the sixth season of the series, Aída goes to prison and leaves the series; in her place comes Soraya, her daughter who had disappeared years ago, who moves into the family home with her daughter Aidita.

Other than her family, Aída spends time with her best friend, prostitute Paz, Chema, a smart store-owner, Chema's effeminate son, Fidel, and Mauricio, a chauvinistic bar owner.

There was a small controversy in 2007, when the show had to remove some jokes in a plot where Aída starts a relationship with a priest, so as to not offend the Catholic Church. This was one of the fourth season's plots, which were described as more radical than the previous seasons, though the creators insisted that they still reflected reality.

=== Season 6 changes ===
The show saw changes in Season 6 when Aída was written out of the show (with the character going to prison), as Carmen Machi left the show, saying it was to pursue new projects. In 2019, Machi said that she handled the fame was receiving quite badly, developing social anxieties, and left the show to deal with this. The characters of Soraya and her daughter Aída Jr. were introduced. Other characters changed in their personalities: Mauricio toned down his chauvinism and fell for Soraya, and Jonathan was made "dumber" as a result of going through puberty. Though Soraya and Aidita are new characters for the sixth season, they had been included in the television bible from before the show began, with Aída's three children all being mentioned in 7 vidas.

== Setting ==
The show is located in a fictional neighbourhood called Esperanza Sur. This seems to be a stand in for the district of Carabanchel, in the south of Madrid, as it includes the Urgel metro entrance and two-to-three storey buildings with green windows, which are common in the district.

== Characters ==
=== García García family ===
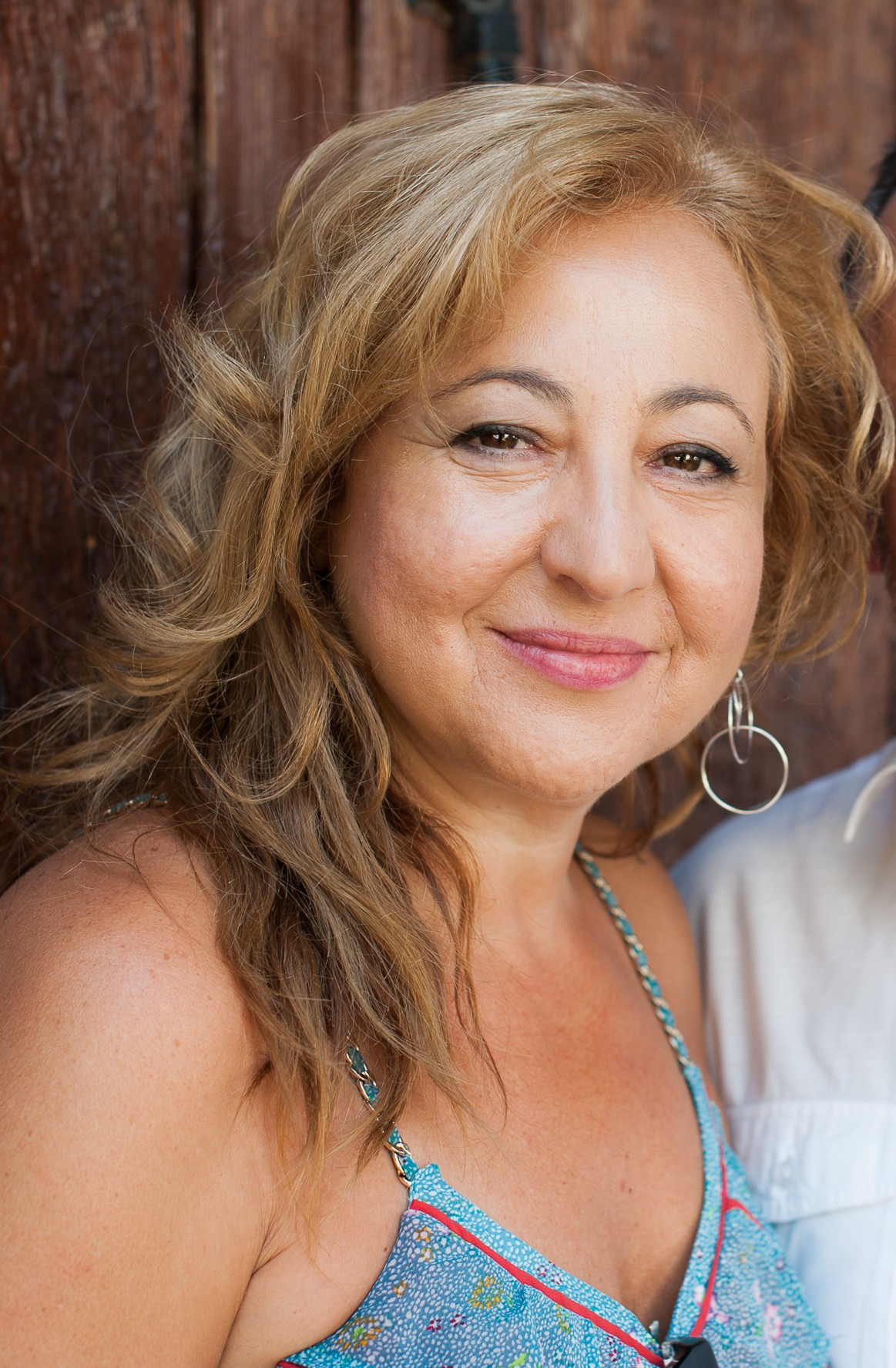
Carmen Machi in 2014

- Aída García (Carmen Machi) is a 45-year-old divorcee, mother of three, and a cleaner. She lives with her mother, her brother, and youngest children. She works several jobs and has difficulty making ends meet. She wanted to finish her studies, but couldn't afford it. She also struggles with alcoholism.
- Luis Mariano "Luisma" García (Paco León) is a 35-year-old ex-drug addict. He is Aída's younger brother. Since age 13, he had an on-and-off relationship with Paz, a childhood friend of his.
- Eugenia "La Bim Bam Bum" García (Marisol Ayuso) is a 65-year-old widow. She is Aida and Luisma's mother. When her husband died, her daughter and grandchildren moved in with her. She believes she is an incredibly famous actress because she used to sing at a club, and claims to have had sex with numerous celebrities and public figures, mostly Spanish politicians and Hollywood stars. She has a great passion for food and is rude to people.
- Soraya García García (Miren Ibarguren) is Aída's oldest daughter. She moved out when she turned 18 due to her mother's alcoholism. She joined the cast in the sixth season, returning home with her only daughter, Aída Jr., fleeing from her abusive husband. Soraya is a kind person, but in her youth she was unruly and abusive, especially with Simon. She falls in love with Chema when she arrives in the neighborhood.
- Lorena García García (Ana María Polvorosa) is Aída's second daughter, known for her red hair and her endless string of boyfriends. She enjoys playing pranks on Luisma and Eugenia, along with her brother Jonathan.
- Jonathan García García (David Castillo) is Aída's youngest child. Far from being an ideal son, Jonathan is disrespectful, steals, and has had several run-ins with the law. However, he still remains noble at heart.
- Aída "Aidita" Padilla García is Soraya's daughter. She has great passion for food, like her great-grandmother Eugenia.

=== The Neighbours ===
- José María "Chema" Martínez (Pepe Viyuela) is a 45-year-old divorced man. He is the owner of the market store "La Colonial". Chema is an intelligent, educated man, but although he has a degree in Hispanic philology, he hasn't been able to find a matching job. This makes him the butt of jokes in the neighbourhood. He has been friend of Aída and Luisma since childhood; when he was 18, he was Aída's date to their prom.
- Fidel Martínez (Eduardo Casanova) is Chema's 16-year-old son. He is somewhat of an outcast in the neighbourhood due to his intelligence, his hobbies (dancing and painting), and for being very effeminate. He has few friends, but Jonathan is one of them. He is openly gay.
- Paz Bermejo (Melani Olivares) is Aída's 34-year-old best friend, who she knows since childhood. She is a sweet and good woman, despite having worked as a prostitute for 10 years for lack of a better paying job. She dislikes her job and keeps it mostly secret, and only her close friends (Aída, Chema, Luisma, and Fidel) know about it. She pretends to be a nurse in front of Aída's children, and a flight attendant to the neighbourhood.
- Mauricio Colmenero (Mariano Peña) is a 50-year-old man. He is a chauvinist, fascist, exploiter, perverted, xenophobe, and homophobe. He is a bullfight aficionado and a fan of Burt Reynolds, who he named his bar (Bar Reinols) after, having several pictures of the actor on the wall. He enjoys making fun of other people, especially Chema.
- Oswaldo Wenceslao Huitalcoche de Todos los Santos, also known as "Machu-Pichu" (Oscar Reyes) is an Ecuadorian waiter for Bar Reinols. Mauricio constantly mocks him.
- Barajas (real name Víctor Francisco Antolín Marín) (Canco Rodríguez) is Luisma's best friend, and an ex-junkie. He behaves more daft than Luisma.
- Inmaculada "Macu" Colmenero (Pepa Rus) is Mauricio's niece. She is a stereotype of the "Spanish redneck people".
- Antonio "Toni" Comenero (Secun de la Rosa) is Mauricio's gay brother. He is a lawyer.
- Simón Bermejo (Dani Martinez) is Paz's little brother. He's a womanizer and very persuasive.

== Awards ==
Ondas Awards

- 2008 - Best Female Actress (Carmen Machi)
- 2006 - Best National Show

ATV Awards

- 2007 - Best Actress (Carmen Machi)
- 2007 - Best Actor (Paco León)
- 2007 - Best Script
- 2005 - Best Actor (Paco León)

TP de Oro

- 2007 - Best Actress (Carmen Machi)
- 2005 - Best Actress (Carmen Machi)
- 2005 - Best Actor (Paco León)

Fotogramas de Plata

- 2007 - Best TV Actress (Carmen Machi)
- 2007 - Best TV Actor (Paco León)
- 2005 - Best TV Actress (Carmen Machi)
- 2005 - Best TV Actor (Paco León)

Screen Actors Guild Awards

- 2006 - Best Supporting TV Actor (Mariano Peña)
- 2005 - Best Lead TV Actress (Carmen Machi)
- 2005 - Best Lead TV Actor (Paco León)
- 2005 - Best Supporting TV Actor (Pepe Viyuela)

== Episodes and release ==
The series aired weekly on Telecinco from 16 January 2005 to 8 June 2014. Its premiere episode was watched by about 7 million people in Spain. The viewership then dropped by over a million in its third week. The show remained nonetheless popular throughout its run, taking the majority viewers on most occasions (losing out to some politics and football games when scheduled together). The 100th episode was a musical episode; Paco León said that the cast asked to do this, because many of them are dancers and singers as well. The show was well-received by critics, and was analysed by Spanish media and academics alike as the perfect recipe for success in its genre.

== Broadcasters ==
- Spain - Telecinco
- Mexico - TV Azteca
- Puerto Rico - CaribeVisión
- Bulgaria - bTV Comedy
- United States - WJAN-CD
