= La caza =

La caza may refer to:

- The Hunt (1966 film) (Spanish: La caza), a Spanish psychological thriller film
- La caza (TV series), a Spanish television series
  - La caza. Guadiana, season three in the series
  - La caza. Monteperdido, season one in the series
  - La caza. Tramuntana, season two in the series

== See also ==
- La Casa (disambiguation)
