= Two Graves (TV series) =

Spanish tv series

- Promotional release poster
- Spanish: Dos tumbas
- Created by: Agustín Martínez
- Written by: Jorge Díaz; Antonio Mercero
- Story by: Agustín Martínez
- Directed by: Kike Maíllo
- Starring: Kiti Mánver; Álvaro Morte; Hovik Keuchkerian
- Country of origin: Spain
- Original language: Spanish

Production
- Executive producers: Toni Carrizosa; Verónica Vila-San-Juan; Kike Maíllo
- Production company: Sábado Películas

Original release
- Network: Netflix

Two Graves (Spanish: Dos tumbas) is a 2025 Spanish revenge thriller miniseries created by Agustín Martínez. It stars Kiti Mánver, Álvaro Morte, and Hovik Keuchkerian.

== Plot ==
After two girls (Marta and Verónica) disappear, the grandmother of one of them (Isabel) goes to great lengths to uncover the truth.

== Cast ==
- Kiti Mánver as Isabel
- Álvaro Morte as Rafael Salazar
- Hovik Keuchkerian as Antonio
- Nadia Vilaplana as Verónica
- Zoé Arnao as Marta
- Salva Reina as Carlos Raén
- Joan Solé as Sergeant Zaera
- Carlos Scholz as Beltrán
- Iván Prados as Jonás
- Nonna Cardoner as Lupe
- Magdalena Tejado as Jamila
- Ben Zahra as Farid
- Magdalena Tejado as Jamila
- Camino Fernández as Carmen
- Rubén Carballés as Salazar's attorney
- Antonella Pinto as Isabel's friend
- Óscar Dorta as Ginés

== Production ==
Written by Jorge Díaz and Antonio Mercero, the screenplay was based on an original story by fellow Carmen Mola member Agustín Martínez, the series creator. Two Graves is a Sábado Películas production for Netflix. Toni Carrizosa, Verónica Vila-San-Juan, and Kike Maíllo served as executive producers.

Shooting locations in the Axarquía included Torrox, Frigiliana, and Nerja.

== Release ==
All three episodes of the series were released on Netflix on 29 August 2025.

== Accolades ==
Year	Award	Category	Nominee(s)	Result	Ref.
2026	27th Iris Awards	Best Fiction		Nominated	
2026	27th Iris Awards	Best Fiction Screenplay	Agustín Martínez, Jorge Díaz, Antonio Mercero	Nominated	
2026	27th Iris Awards	Best Direction	Kike Maíllo	Nominated	

== See also ==
- 2025 in Spanish television
