= La caza (TV series) =

Spanish television series

- Genre: Police procedural
- Created by: Agustín Martínez
- Country of origin: Spain
- Original language: Spanish
- No. of seasons: 4
- No. of episodes: 32

Production
- Production companies: RTVE (seasons 1–3); Movistar Plus+ (s. 4)

Related
- La caza. Monteperdido; La caza. Tramuntana; La caza. Guadiana; La caza. Irati

La caza is a Spanish police procedural thriller television series. It consists in four self-contained stories developed in four limited series (or seasons): La caza. Monteperdido, La caza. Tramuntana, La caza. Guadiana, and La caza. Irati. Each series narrates the investigation by a Civil Guard's Central Operative Unit (UCO) team of a crime committed in a different location.

Initially developed as a limited series based on the novel Monteperdido by Agustín Martínez, it was expanded to three additional stories. The first three were produced by Radiotelevisión Española (RTVE) and aired on La 1; and the fourth by Movistar Plus+.

== Seasons ==
=== La caza. Monteperdido (2019) ===
Two girls, Ana and Lucía, disappear in the Pyrenees in the province of Huesca. Five years later Ana appears. Santiago Baín and Sara Campos, two Civil Guard's Central Operative Unit (UCO) agents arriving from Madrid, take over the investigation, partnering with a local officer, Víctor Gamero.

The series was developed as a limited series based on the novel Monteperdido by Agustín Martínez by Martínez himself together with Luis Moya. Produced by DLO Producciones for Radiotelevisión Española (RTVE), its eight episodes were aired on La 1 of Televisión Española (TVE) between 25 March 2019 and 20 May 2019.

=== La caza. Tramuntana (2021) ===
Sara Campos and Víctor Gamero investigate the murder of Bernat Cervera in Tramuntana, a fictional village in the Serra de Tramuntana mountain range, in Mallorca.

Produced by DLO Producciones for RTVE, its eight episodes aired on La 1 between 13 January 2021 and 3 March 2021.

=== La caza. Guadiana (2023) ===
Sara Campos and Víctor Gamero investigate the disappearance of a woman, Alicia, in the fictional riverside village of Frontera de Guadiana, located in the Spanish-Portuguese border over the Guadiana river.

Produced by DLO Producciones for RTVE, its eight episodes aired on La 1 between 16 March 2023 and 20 April 2023.

=== La caza. Irati (2025) ===
Gloria Mencía investigates a crime at the western Pyrenees' Irati Forest in Navarre, with the help of Sara Campos.

Produced by DLO Producciones for Movistar Plus+, its eight episodes were released on 4 September 2025.

== Episodes ==
Series	Episodes	Originally released			Avg. viewers (millions)	Avg. share	Ref.
Series	Episodes	First released	Last released	Network	Avg. viewers (millions)	Avg. share	Ref.
Monteperdido	8	25 March 2019	20 May 2019	La 1	2.159	14.0%	
Tramuntana	8	13 January 2021	3 March 2021	La 1	1.199	6.8%	
Guadiana	8	16 March 2023	20 April 2023	La 1	0.957	7.6%	
Irati	8	4 September 2025		Movistar Plus+	TBA	TBA	TBA

== Cast and characters ==
Character	Portrayed by	Monteperdido	Tramuntana	Guadiana	Irati
Character	Portrayed by	2019	2021	2023	2025
Sara Campos	Megan Montaner	Main	Main	Main	Main
Santiago Baín	Francis Lorenzo	Main		Main	
Víctor Gamero	Alain Hernández	Main	Main	Main	Guest
Raquel Mur	Bea Segura	Main			
Álvaro Montrell	Pablo Derqui	Main			
Rafael Grau	Patxi Freytez	Main			
Joaquín Castán	Jorge Bosch	Main			
Montse Grau	Mar Sodupe	Main			
Quim Castán Grau	David Solans	Main			
Ana Montrell Mur	Carla Díaz	Main			
Caridad	Beatriz Carvajal	Main	Main	Main	Guest
Nicolás Souto	Jordi Sánchez	Main			
Ernesto Selva	Félix Gómez		Main	Main	Main
Catalina Trias	Sara Rivero		Main		
Madó Teresa	Llum Barrera		Main		
Llorenç Company	Óscar Molina		Main		
Inés Mestre	Victoria Pagès		Main		
Samiah Chrérif	Nadia Al Saidi		Main		
Gerard Torres	Ernest Villegas		Main		
Joanna Bosch	Elia Galera		Main		
Julia Reig	María Mercado		Main		
Lance Reader	Andrew Tarbet		Main		
Mónica Vinent	Íngrid Rubio		Main		
Bela Lebedev	Zoe Stein		Main		
Manuel Navas	Pepe Viyuela			Main	
Carmen Castillo	Pepa Aniorte			Main	
Mario Navas Castillo	Kevin Medina			Main	
Leo Navas Castillo	Cristina Kovani			Main	
Alicia Garrido Luque	Claudia Galán			Main	
Diego Sotelo	Juanlu González			Main	
Isabel	Ángela Chica			Main	
Aurelio Santana Mencía	Almagro San Miguel			Main	
Rocío Nerva	Helena Kaittani			Main	
Gloria Mencía	Silvia Alonso				Main
Julen Echagüe	Roger Casamajor				Main
Valentina Curbelo	Mariam Hernández				Main
Laia Dávalos	Ángela Cremonte				Main
Markel Sanz	Eloy Azorín				Main
