= The Gypsy Bride =

- Genre: Crime; Mystery; Noir
- Based on: La novia gitana by Carmen Mola
- Written by: José Rodríguez; Antonio Mercero; Jorge Díaz; Susana Martín Gijón
- Directed by: Paco Cabezas
- Starring: Nerea Barros; Darío Grandinetti; Ignacio Montes; Lucía Martín Abello; Vicente Romero; Mona Martínez; Francesc Garrido; Ginés García Millán; Mónica Estarreado; Moreno Borja; Miguel Ángel Solá; Zaira Romero; Óscar de la Fuente
- No. of seasons: 1
- No. of episodes: 8

Production
- Running time: c. 50 min
- Production companies: ViacomCBS International Studios; Atresmedia Televisión; Diagonal TV

Original release
- Network: ATRESplayer Premium
- Release: 25 September 2022

Related
- The Purple Network

The Gypsy Bride (Spanish: La novia gitana) is a Spanish television series directed by Paco Cabezas adapting the novel of the same name by Carmen Mola that began airing on 25 September 2022. It stars Nerea Barros as the lead character Inspector Elena Blanco.

== Plot ==
Set in the heart of the Spanish Romani community, the fiction follows police inspector Elena Blanco and her team, as they try to crack the crime case pertaining to the murders of sisters Lara and Susana Macaya, separated by a 7-year gap.

== Cast ==
- Nerea Barros as Elena Blanco
- Vicente Romero as Orduño
- Mona Martínez as Mariajo
- Moreno Borja as Moisés Macaya
- Ginés García Millán as Rentero
- Ignacio Montes as Zárate
- Darío Grandinetti as Miguel Vistas
- Lucía Martín Abello as Chesca
- Francesc Garrido as Buendía
- Mónica Estarreado as Sonia
- Lola Casamayor as Ascensión
- Miguel Ángel Solá as Salvador
- Carlos Cabra as El Capi
- Zaira Romero as Susana Macaya
- Daniel Ibáñez as Caracas
- Miguel Hermoso as Masegosa
- Cecilia Gómez as Cintia
- Emilio Palacios as Raúl
- Óscar de la Fuente as Antonio Jaúregui
- Manel Sans as Lusson

== Production ==
The series was produced by ViacomCBS International Studios alongside Atresmedia Televisión and Diagonal TV (Banijay Iberia). The series is an adaptation of the novel La novia gitana by Carmen Mola, a penname for Agustín Martínez, Jorge Díaz and Antonio Mercero. José Rodríguez and Antonio Mercero (coordinators) took over writing duties alongside Jorge Díaz and Susana Martín Gijón. Shooting began in January 2022. It will consist of 8 episodes featuring a running time of around 50 minutes.

== Release ==
Prior to its streaming release, the first episode screened at the 70th San Sebastián International Film Festival. The first two episodes debuted in Spain on Atresplayer Premium on 25 September 2021.

== Accolades ==
Year	Award	Category	Nominee(s)	Result	Ref.
2023	10th Feroz Awards	Best Main Actress in a Series	Nerea Barros	Nominated	
2023	10th Feroz Awards	Best Supporting Actor in a Series	Vicente Romero	Nominated	
2023	25th Iris Awards	Best Fiction Production	Jaume Banacolocha, Laura Abril	Pending	
2023	25th Iris Awards	Best Fiction Cinematography	Andreu Adam	Pending	
