= La caza. Guadiana =

- Promotional release poster
- Created by: Agustín Martínez
- Directed by: Rafa Montesinos; Mar Olid; Javier Pulido
- Starring: Megan Montaner; Alain Hernández; Félix Gómez
- Country of origin: Spain
- Original language: Spanish

Production
- Production companies: RTVE; DLO Producciones

Original release
- Network: La 1
- Release: 16 March – 20 April 2023

Related
- La caza; La caza. Monteperdido; La caza. Tramuntana

La caza. Guadiana is a Spanish limited crime mystery television series created by Agustín Martínez. Set in a sleepy Andalusian village near the Portuguese border. It is the third series/season of La caza.

== Plot ==
Twelve years after a massacre in the riverside village of Frontera de Guadiana (located in the Spanish-Portuguese border) by teen Mario (whose criminal case was handled by a young Sara Campos and lieutenant Baín), sergeants Selva and Gamero investigate the disappearance of a woman, Alicia, in the village.

== Cast ==
- Megan Montaner as Sara Campos
- Alain Hernández as Víctor Gamero
- Félix Gómez as Félix Gómez
- Francis Lorenzo as Santiago Baín
- Kevin Medina as Mario
- Cristina Kovani as Leo
- Pepa Aniorte as Carmen
- Pepe Viyuela as Manuel
- Sebastián Haro as Alfonso
- Almagro San Miguel as Aure
- Carlos Suárez as Tino
- Claudia Galán as Alicia
- Juanlu González as Diego
- Helena Kaittani as Rocío
- Mercedes León as Mercedes
- Ángela Chica as Isa
- Almar G. Sato as Sonia
- Juanfra Juarez as Gato
- Esperanza Guardado as Maribel
- Beatriz Carvajal as Caridad
- Mauricio Morales as Moisés
- Laura Baena as Dolores
- Celia Ferrer as Rita
- Claudio Portalo as Nico

== Production ==
The series was produced by Radiotelevisión Española (RTVE) in collaboration with DLO Producciones. It was filmed from February to March 2022. Shooting locations in the province of Huelva included Sanlúcar de Guadiana, Ayamonte, Isla Cristina, Lepe, and El Granado.

== Release ==
The series premiered on La 1 on 16 April 2023. The broadcasting run ended on 20 April 2023.
