= The Purple Network =

Spanish neo-noir thriller television miniseries

- Promotional release poster
- Spanish: La red púrpura
- Genre: Neo-noir; Crime thriller
- Created by: Paco Cabezas
- Based on: La red púrpura by Carmen Mola
- Directed by: Paco Cabezas; Juan Miguel del Castillo
- Country of origin: Spain
- Original language: Spanish
- No. of episodes: 8

Production
- Running time: 47–59 minutes
- Production companies: Paramount Television International Studios; Atresmedia Televisión; Diagonal TV

Original release
- Network: Atresplayer
- Release: 8 October – 26 November 2023

Related
- The Gypsy Bride

The Purple Network (Spanish: La red púrpura) is a Spanish neo-noir thriller television miniseries created, co-directed and executively produced by Paco Cabezas based on the novel of the same name by Carmen Mola. It is a follow-up to The Gypsy Bride, with Nerea Barros returning as inspector Elena Blanco.

== Plot ==
Upon finding that her long-missing son Lucas is alive but is a member of the sinister Purple Network, inspector Elena Blanco investigates about the aforementioned network.

== Cast ==
- Nerea Barros as Elena Blanco
- Vicente Romero as Orduño
- Ignacio Montes as Zárate
- Mona Martínez as Mariajo
- Lucía Martín Abello as Chesca
- Francesc Garrido as Buendía
- Roberto Álamo as Dimas
- Ginés García Millán as Rentero
- Carmen Prada as Marina
- Nuria González as Rocío Narváez
- Andrés Gertrúdix as Casto
- María Morales as Soledad
- Michel Herráiz as Daniel
- Font García as Alberto
- Unai Mayo as Lucas
- Andrés Lima as Kortabarria
- Maria Mercado as Aurora
- Hugo Prieto as Lucas niño

== Production ==
The series was produced by Paramount Television International Studios alongside Atresmedia Televisión and Diagonal (Banijay Iberia).

== Release ==
The series was presented at the 71st San Sebastián International Film Festival in September 2023. It debuted on Atresplayer on 8 October 2023, with a broadcasting run set to wrap on 26 November 2023.

== Reception ==
Javier Cazallas of HobbyConsolas rated the series with 77 points, pointing out that if you liked The Gypsy Bride you will like La red púrpura.

Berto Molina of El Confidencial deemed La red púrpura to be one of the best Spanish series of its genre, otherwise bringing attention to Nerea Barros, in possibly the role of her life.
