= Bitter Daisies =

Spanish television dramatic series

- Galician: O sabor das margaridas
- Genre: Crime; Drama; Thriller
- Written by: Ghaleb Jaber Martínez; Eligio Montero; Raquel Arias.
- Directed by: Miguel Conde
- Starring: Maria Mera; Nerea Barros; Miguel Insua; Ricardo de Barreiro; Toni Salgado
- Country of origin: Spain
- Original languages: Galician, Spanish
- No. of series: 2
- No. of episodes: 12

Production
- Production location: Galicia
- Running time: 70 minutes

Original release
- Network: Televisión de Galicia
- Release: 1 October 2018 – 26 April 2020

Bitter Daisies (original title in Galician: O sabor das margaridas) is a television dramatic series produced by CTV in Spain, and written in the Galician language. It was directed by Miguel Conde and premiered on Televisión de Galicia on October 3, 2018 and on Netflix on March 31, 2019. It was the first Galician-language series distributed by the platform.

The series stars María Mera, Miguel Insua, Ricardo de Barreiro, Nerea Barros and Toni Salgado. Screenplays were written by Ghaleb Jaber Martínez, Eligio Montero and Raquel Arias.

The first season consists of six episodes of approximately 70 minutes each. A second season, also consisting of six episodes, premiered on Netflix 2 April 2021 but removed in July 2025.

The show was nominated in eight categories in the XVII Mestre Mateo Awards of 2018, hosted by the Academia Galega do Audiovisual (AGA), winning for best television series.

A month after its international release in Netflix it scored 7th in the Top ten most-watched non-English language shows in the UK The series was removed from Netflix in 2025.

== Plot ==
Rosa Vargas is a rookie police officer of the Spanish Civil Guard who arrives in the small interior Galicia town of Murias to investigate the disappearance of a young girl named Marta Labrada. Although everything points to Marta leaving the town on her own, Rosa goes further and discovers a dark secret that surrounds the small town of Murias, and the investigation discovers a series of crimes that had remained hidden in the village "where nothing ever happens".

== Cast and characters ==
=== Main ===
- María Mera as Eva Mayo, in Season 1, a member of the civil guard, operating under the name of Rosa Vargas, investigating Marta's disappearance; in Season 2, no longer a civil guard and seeking revenge on The Lily.
- Toni Salgado as Mauro Seoane, a hotheaded civil guard distrusting of Eva.
- Carlos Villarino as Carl Maltilla, a strange father consumed by his own sexual fantasies.
- Sara Sanz as Rebeca Seoane, Mauro's daughter.
- Martina Stetson as Margarita "Daisy" Mayo, Eva's deceased sister.
- Yelena Molina as Samanta, an employee at a brothel in Murias; has a relationship with Xabier

=== Season 1 ===
- Miguel Insua as Alberte Figuerona, a soon-to-be retired civil guard.
- Manuel Cortés as Xabier, a devout catholic in a relationship with Samanta and very protective of his little brother Barnebé.
- Denis Gómez as Barnebé, a kind-hearted but traumatised little brother of Xabier; a kleptomaniac.
- Lucia Álvarez as Luisa, Mauro's wife.
- Iñaqui Rosado as Ivân, a regular client at the brothel.
- Nerea Barros as Pamela, another woman who works at the brothel; becomes an informant for Eva.
- Jimmy Nuñez as Brais, Rebeca's ex-boyfriend.
- Xavier Pan as Padre Amaro, a local priest.
- Paloma Saavedra as Marta Labrada, a friend of Rebeca whose mysterious disappearance instigates an investigation.
- Santi Cuquejo as David, a photographer interested in Rebeca.
- Mariana Expôsito Castaño as Rafa, a satanist store clerk.
- Ricardo de Barreiro as Vidal, owner of the brothel Samanta works for.
- Fran Paredes as Miguel, a teacher at Rebeca's school.
- Alicia Armenteros as Vivi, a new girl at the brothel.
- Alejandro Martinez as Muñiz, a terminally-ill garage owner.
- Xoel Fernândez as Ricardo Bergantiños, a real estate agent.
- Victoria Pérez as Sandra, Alberte's daughter.
- Claudia Basallo as Nuria, Alberte's granddaughter.
- Covadonga Berdiñas as Maruxa.
- Lúa Testa as Ana.

=== Season 2 ===
- Noelia Castaño as Laura Nogueira, a journalist interested in Eva.
- Santi Prego as Rául Salgado, a senior inspector investigating a series of murders seemingly inspired by Dante's Inferno.
- Nanda Tasende as Elena Mayo, Eva's catatonic mother.
- César Cambeiro as Amaro Mayo, Eva's father.
- Rebeca Stones as Lidia "Huichi" Fernández, a woman working for Porto Modeling.
- Nacho Castaño as Carlos, a new attendee to The Lily's parties; likes Eva.
- Miguel Pernas as Moreiras, a judge.
- Miguel Borines as Abreu, a police chief.
- David Seijo as Miranda, an inspector under Salgado.
- Maria Costas as Claudia, Salgado's ex-wife.

== Production ==
=== Shooting ===
Filming began in May 2018, and ended on June 22, with external locations in Abegondo, A Estrada, Vedra and Santiago de Compostela, and in CTV studios in Teo.

=== Debut ===
The series premiered on October 1, 2018 at the Abanca auditorium of Santiago de Compostela. International premier was March 31, 2019 in Netflix.
