= 21st Iris Awards (Spain) =

Television awards

- Date: 18 November 2019
- Site: Nuevo Teatro Alcalá, Madrid
- Hosted by: Inés Ballester; Jota Abril
- Organized by: Academy of Television Arts and Sciences

Television coverage
- Network: LaOtra

The 21st Iris Awards ceremony, organised by the Academy of Television Arts and Sciences, honoured the best in Spanish television of 2019 and took place at the Nuevo Teatro Alcalá in Madrid on 18 November 2019.

== Awards ==
The 21st Iris Awards were held on 18 November 2019 at the Nuevo Teatro Alcalá in Madrid, Spain. Hosted by Inés Ballester and Jota Abril, the ceremony was broadcast on LaOtra. Netflix's Money Heist was the night's biggest winner, obtaining the 5 awards it was nominated for. Besides the Iris awards conceded by the academy, the jury's and critics' Iris awards were also delivered during the ceremony. The critics' award was gifted ex-aequo to Cuéntame cómo pasó and Sálvame. The jury's awards were gifted to Toñi Moreno, La Sexta, TVE's Prodigios, CMMedia's Los investigadores, and Victim Number 8. The awards given by the academy are listed as follows:

Best Actor: Álvaro Morte — Money Heist (Netflix); Alain Hernández — La caza. Monteperdido (La1); Brays Efe — Paquita Salas (Netflix); Darío Grandinetti — Hierro (Movistar+); Isak Férriz — Gigantes (Movistar+); Pepe Viyuela — Matadero (Antena 3)	Best Actress: Alba Flores — Money Heist (Netflix); Belén Cuesta — Paquita Salas (Netflix); Candela Peña — Hierro (Movistar+); Elvira Mínguez — Presunto culpable (Antena 3); Inma Cuesta — Arde Madrid (Movistar+); Megan Montaner — La caza. Monteperdido (La1)
Best Direction: Jesús Colmenar, Alejandro Bazzano, Miguel Ángel Vivas, Álex Rodrigo — Money Heist (Netflix); Alejandro Bazzano, Alberto Ruiz Rojo, Menna Fité – Presunto culpable (Antena 3); Curro Velázquez — Donde comen dos (La1); Javier Calvo, Javier Ambrossi — Paquita Salas (Netflix); Marisol Navarro, Antonio González — La voz (Antena 3); Patricia Fernández, Hugo Tomás — Masterchef Celebrity 3 (La1)	Best Fiction: Money Heist (Netflix); Arde Madrid (Movistar+); Hierro (Movistar+); La caza. Monteperdido (La1); Matadero (Antena 3); Presunto culpable (Antena 3)
Best Screenplay: Pepe Coira — Hierro (Movistar+); Adolfo Vázquez & Benjamín Herranz — Donde comen dos (La1); El cielo puede esperar's writing team (Movistar+); Gente Hablando's writing team — Neox, Atresplayer & Flooxer; Javier Calvo & Javier Ambrossi — Paquita Salas (Netflix); Laura Llopis Negre — El hormiguero (Antena 3)	Best News Program: Al rojo vivo (laSexta); La 2 noticias (La2); Antena 3 Noticias 1 (Antena 3); Buenos días, Madrid — Telemadrid; El debate decisivo de Atresmedia (Antena3 & laSexta)
Best Newscast Presenter: Carlos Franganillo — Telediario 2 (La1); Helena Resano — Noticias 14:00h (laSexta); Sandra Golpe — Antena 3 Noticias 1 (Antena 3); Silvia Intxaurrondo — Telenoticias Fin de semana (Telemadrid)	Best TV Host: David Broncano — La resistencia (Movistar+); Alberto Chicote — ¿Te lo vas a comer? (Antena 3); Anne Igartiburu — Corazón (La1); Cristina Pardo — Liarla Pardo (laSexta); Juanra Bonet — ¡Boom! (Antena 3); Roberto Leal — Operación Triunfo (La1)
Best Production: Cristina López Ferrar — Money Heist (Netflix); El cielo puede esperar's production crew (Movistar+); La caza. Monteperdido's production crew (La1); MasterChef Celebrity's production crew (La1); Masters de la reforma's production crew (Antena 3); Tu cara me suena's production crew (Antena 3)	Best TV Show: Cachitos de hierro y cromo (La2); ¡Boom! (Antena 3); Donde comen dos (La1); El cielo puede esperar (Movistar+); Imprescindibles (La2); ¿Te lo vas a comer? (laSexta)
Best Children Show: Lunnis de leyenda; Episode: "Capítulo Museo del Prado" (Clan); Gente Maravillosa Peques (CMMedia/Canal Sur); Horaci L'Inuit (TV3); Tex (Clan/TV3)	Best TV Show produced for a theme channel: España después de la guerra (Dmax); Deportistas de Élite (Teledeporte; El Chiringuito de Jugones (Mega; Follow San Francisco (Neox/Atresplayer/Flooxer); ¡Stop princesas! Live (Comedy Central
Best Camera Direction: José María Sánchez-Chiquito — San Fermín 2019 (La1); Antena 3 Noticias's production team (Antena 3); El debate decisivo de Atresmedia's production team (Antena3/laSexta); Fama a bailar's production team (Movistar+); Rubén Artalejo — Hundidos (La2); Seli Martínez Domínguez — Mi casa es la tuya (Telecinco)
