= Sin identidad =

Television series

- Genre: Drama; Thriller
- Created by: Samuel Bouza
- Written by: Sergi Belbel; Cristina Clemente
- Directed by: Joan Noguera
- Starring: Megan Montaner; Tito Valverde; Daniel Grao; Lydia Bosch; Jordi Rebellón; Miguel Ángel Muñoz; Eloy Azorín; Victoria Abril; Elvira Mínguez; Antonio Hortelano; Luis Mottola; Amparo Valle; Marisol Membrillo; Cristina de Inza; Javier Ballesteros; Joseba Apaolaza; Mar Regueras; Rodrigo Guirao
- Country of origin: Spain
- Original language: Spanish
- No. of seasons: 2
- No. of episodes: 23

Production
- Executive producers: Jaume Banacolocha; Joan Bas; Pedro García Caja; Beatriz Herzog; Montserrat García
- Running time: 80 minutes
- Production company: Diagonal TV

Original release
- Network: Antena 3
- Release: May 13, 2014 – July 9, 2015

Sin identidad (English: No identity) is a Spanish thriller drama television series produced by Diagonal TV for Antena 3. The series was premiered on May 13, 2014.

== Cast ==
Main

- Megan Montaner as María Fuentes Vergel/María Duque/Mercedes Dantés Petrova
- Tito Valverde as Enrique Vergel
- Jordi Rebellón as Francisco José Fuentes Cel
- Daniel Grao as Juan Prados
- Lydia Bosch as Luisa Vergel de Fuentes
- Miguel Ángel Muñoz as Bruno Vergel
- Luis Mottola as Roberto Baffi
- Eloy Azorín as Pablo
- Verónica Sánchez as Amparo Duque
- Antonio Hortelano as Curro
- Mar Regueras as Miriam Prats (season 2)
- Silvia Alonso as Helena Prats (season 2)
- Raúl Prieto as Alex Barral (season 2)
- Mateo Jalón as Enrique "Quique" Vergel Duque (season 2)
- Andrea del Río as Eva (season 2)
- Ágata Roca as Blanca (season 2)
- Agnes Kiraly as Irina Petrova
- Cristina de Inza as Eugenia de Vergel
- Victoria Abril as Fernanda Duque

Other

Actor/Actress	Character	Short description
Teresa Arbolí	Manuela Carmen de Luna	He leaves after helping María to return to Spain
Luismi Astorga	Carlos	Run after helping his brother Paul
Javier Ballesteros	Jorge Vergel	Run after making a pact with Enrique
Toni Martínez	Néstor	The jail after the discovery of child trafficking
Elvira Minguez	Sor Antonia	Flee after discovery of child trafficking organized by her and Enrique Vergel
Amparo Valle	Micaela "La Tata"	María goes home when you need to remember things from your past
Joseba Apaolaza	Alfredo	Enrique flees after trying to jettison its plan
Julio Vélez	Nico	Run after making a mess Curro in prison
Begoña Maestre	Lucía	It comes and goes when María need
Marisol Membrillo	Trinidad "Trini"	After incineration Fernanda becomes the people
Nikol Kollars	Prisoner	She threatens Maria when she is sent to jail in China

== Episodes ==
Series	Episodes	Originally released		Average viewership	Share (%)	Ref.
Series	Episodes	First released	Last released	Average viewership	Share (%)	Ref.
1	9	13 May 2014	10 July 2014	3,597,000	20.1	
2	14	8 April 2015	8 July 2015	2,499,000	14.5	

=== Season 1 ===
This is a caption
No. overall	No. in season	Title	Viewers	Original release date	Share (%)
1	1	"Mitad y mitad"	4,931,000	13 May 2014	25.7
2	2	"La solución a mis problemas"	3,948,000	20 May 2014	21.4
3	3	"Una luz al final del túnel"	3,494,000	27 May 2014	18.5
4	4	"El enemigo en casa"	3,553,000	3 June 2014	19.3
5	5	"Mi otra vida"	3,591,000	10 June 2014	19.9
6	6	"La sombra del diablo"	3,555,000	17 June 2014	20.7
7	7	"Excusatio non petita"	3,144,000	24 June 2014	17.1
8	8	"Alfiles y peones sin reina"	3,272,000	3 July 2014	19.8
9	9	"Mañana, cuando la venganza empiece"	2.893.000	10 July 2014	18.8

=== Season 2 ===
This is a caption
No. overall	No. in season	Title	Viewers	Original release date	Share (%)
10	1	"He vuelto para vengarme"	3,322,000	8 April 2015	18.8
11	2	"Candado sin cadena"	2,970,000	15 April 2015	16.7
12	3	"Me da miedo dormir"	2,896,000	22 April 2015	15.9
13	4	"Que no encuentren a Mercedes Dantés"	2,619,000	29 April 2015	14.1
14	5	"Gánate su confianza"	2,495,000	6 May 2015	13.7
15	6	"Yo participé en el asesinato de María Fuentes"	2,474,000	13 May 2015	14.1
16	7	"Enrique, voy a por ti"	2,444,000	20 May 2015	13.7
17	8	"Soy feliz"	2,280,000	27 May 2015	13.3
18	9	"La verdad sobre Heffner"	2,174,000	3 June 2015	12.6
19	10	"El Congreso es un fraude"	2,253,000	10 June 2015	12.5
20	11	"Yo sé quién es Mercedes Dantés"	2,182,000	17 June 2015	12.0
21	12	"Del amor al odio"	2,126,000	24 June 2015	13.0
22	13	"En tres días terminará todo"	2,316,000	1 July 2015	15.4
23	14	"El fin de la venganza"	2,439,000	8 July 2015	17.8

== Accolades ==
Year	Award	Category	Nominee(s)	Result	Ref.
2014	2nd MiM Series Awards	Best Drama Series		Nominated	
2015	17th Festival des créations télévisuelles de Luchon	Best Spanish Fiction		Won	
2015	24th Actors and Actresses Union Awards	Best Leading Actress (TV)	Megan Montaner	Nominated	
2015	24th Actors and Actresses Union Awards	Best Leading Actor (TV)	Eloy Azorín	Nominated	
2015	24th Actors and Actresses Union Awards	Best Supporting Actress (TV)	Verónica Sánchez	Nominated	
2015	24th Actors and Actresses Union Awards	Best Supporting Actress (TV)	Victoria Abril	Won	
2015	24th Actors and Actresses Union Awards	Best Actress in a Minor Performance (TV)	Elvira Mínguez	Won	
2015	17th Iris Awards	Best Actress	Victoria Abril	Nominated	
2015	3rd MiM Series Awards	Best Drama Actress	Megan Montaner	Nominated	
2016	25th Actors and Actresses Union Awards	Best Supporting Actor (TV)	Eloy Azorín	Nominated	
2016	18th Iris Awards	Best Actress	Verónica Sánchez	Nominated	
