= Solo (2018 Spanish film) =

Film by Hugo Stuven

- Theatrical release poster
- Directed by: Hugo Stuven
- Written by: Santiago Lallana; Hugo Stuven
- Starring: Alain Hernández; Aura Garrido; Ben Temple
- Cinematography: Ángel Iguácel
- Music by: Sergio Jiménez Lacima
- Distributed by: Filmax
- Release dates: 18 March 2018 (Málaga); 3 August 2018 (Spain)
- Running time: 91 minutes
- Country: Spain
- Language: Spanish

Solo is a 2018 Spanish drama film directed by Hugo Stuven and written by Santiago Lallana and Hugo Stuven about a young surfer who falls off a cliff, injures himself and finds himself in a situation where he needs to fight for his survival.

== Plot ==
The plot dramatises the plight of Álvaro Vizcaíno, a surfer who temporarily disappeared after falling from a cliff in Fuerteventura in 2014.

== Cast ==
- Alain Hernández as Álvaro Vizcaíno
- Aura Garrido as Ona
- Ben Temple as Nelo
- Leticia Etala as Yaiza
- Álvaro Vizcaíno as Él mismo
- Francisco Javier Bolea Fernández as Amigo Ona
- Alessandro Bandello as Amigo Álvaro
- Renzo Murias Ayuso as Amigo Álvaro
- Simón Espinque as Amigo Álvaro
- Yesarela Arzumendi as Amiga Álvaro (as Yesarela Arzumendi Calero)
- Alfonso Fernández Epalza as Amigo Álvaro
- Celia del Busto Griñón as Amiga Álvaro
- José Ignacio Cabezas Díez as Padre Álvaro
- Elvira Isasi Loma Ossorio as Madre Álvaro
- Yanira Soto Cabrera as Hermana Álvaro

== Release ==
The film was presented at the Málaga Film Festival in April 2018. Distributed by Filmax, it was theatrically released in Spain on 3 August 2018.

== Reception ==
Andrea G. Bermejo of Cinemanía rated the film 3 out of 5 stars, writing that Alain Hernández "perfectly masters the screaming scale [of desperation] playing [surfer] Álvaro Vizcaíno".

Beatriz Martínez of Fotogramas rated the film 3 out of 5 stars highlighting a very committed Hernández as the film's standout whilst citing the "dated" attempts of "visual poetry" as a drawback.

== See also ==
- List of Spanish films of 2018
