= Deviant (2024 film) =

Spanish film by Daniel M. Caneiro

- Official artwork - Deviant (2024)
- Directed by: Daniel M. Caneiro
- Written by: Daniel M. Caneiro
- Produced by: Kevin Iglesias; Aintza Serra; Txema Dominguez
- Starring: Alain Hernández; Fernando Albizu; Itziar Aizpuru; Patxi Santamaria
- Cinematography: Daniel Benejam
- Music by: Nerea Alberdi; David Sánchez Damián
- Production companies: Amania Films; Media Attack
- Distributed by: REASON8
- Release date: 29 April 2024 (Fantaspoa)
- Running time: 83 min
- Country: Spain
- Language: Spanish

Deviant is a 2024 Spanish film written and directed by Daniel M. Caneiro. It is produced by Amanda Films and Media Attack. London-based REASON8 handles international sales.

== Plot ==
Javier is a model husband and father, but cannot help himself when he bows out of his family's Christmas eve dinner for a blind date made on a kinky dating app. Instead of a romp with a nubile young woman, he is held captive by a depraved middle- aged man and his mean-spirited cookie craving mother.

== Film Festivals ==
- Fantaspoa
- Fant, Bilbao Fantasy Film Festivall
- Gérardmer International Fantastic Film Festival
- Morbido Fest
