= Luisa Gavasa =

Spanish actress

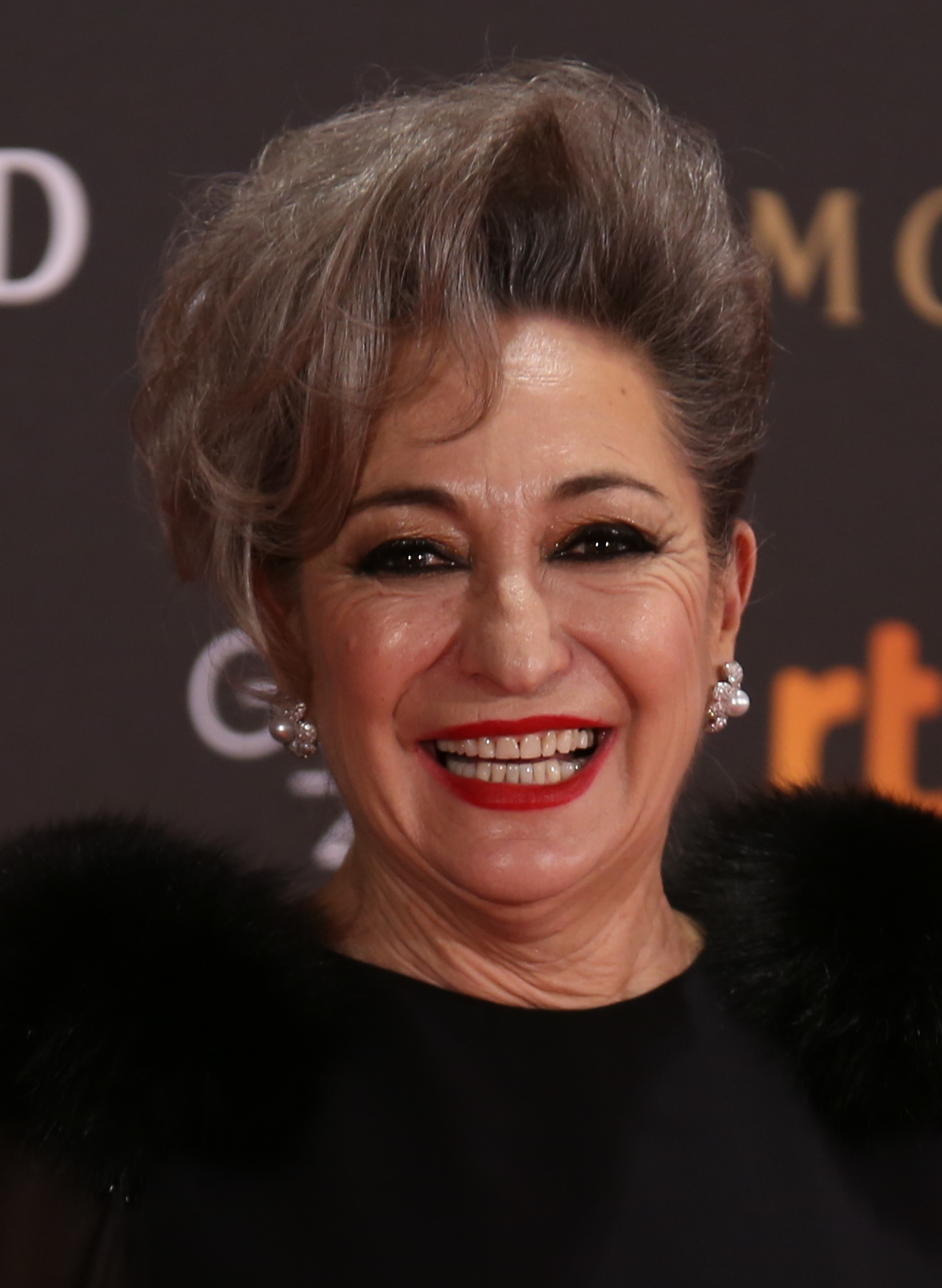
- Gavasa in 2017
- Born: Luisa Gavasa Moragón; 8 April 1951 (age 73); Zaragoza, Spain
- Occupation: Actress

Luisa Gavasa Moragón (born 8 April 1951) is a Spanish actress. She made her feature film debut in Doña Perfecta (1977). Her portrayal of the groom's mother in The Bride (2015) earned her a Goya Award for Best Supporting Actress.

== Selected filmography ==
Year	Title	Role	Notes	Ref.
2011	Chrysalis	Luisa		
2013	Para Elisa			
2015	La novia (The Bride)	La madre ('the mother')		
2017	Las chicas del cable		TV series	
2023	El maestro que prometió el mar (The Teacher Who Promised the Sea)	Charo		
2023	El favor (Just One Small Favor)	Amparito		
2023	Paris 70	Angela		
2024	Historias (Stories)			
