= Paris 70 =

2023 Spanish short drama film

- Promotional poster
- Directed by: Dani Feixas
- Screenplay by: Nach Solís
- Story by: Nach Solís
- Produced by: Dani Feixas; Alba Forn
- Starring: Luisa Gavasa; Alain Hernández; Neus Asensi
- Cinematography: Biel Capellas
- Edited by: Dani Feixas
- Music by: Laura Cruells
- Production companies: Astronaut Films (Cream Cluster Content SL); Vivir Para Ver
- Release date: 31 March 2023 (Skyline Film Festival)
- Running time: 15 minutes
- Country: Spain
- Languages: Catalan; Spanish; French; English

Paris 70 is a 2023 Spanish short film produced and directed by Dani Feixas and written by Nach Solís. Starring Luisa Gavasa, Alain Hernández and Neus Asensi, it is about mother-son relationship. Jan, the son takes care of his mother Angela, who has Alzheimer's disease, which tests his commitment and resistance. It premiered on 31 March 2023 at the Skyline Film Festival. It is also available on YouTube for a limited time.

The film has garnered 150 awards and 190 official international selections. It was also nominated for a Spanish Academy Goya and received an honorable mention at the Cleveland International Film Festival, making its international debut at Indiana's Heartland International Film Festival. Additionally, the film has created an alternative circuit, with over 80 screenings at Alzheimer's associations, foundations, hospitals, and conferences throughout Spain.

In December 2024, it was shortlisted for the Best Live Action Short Film at the 97th Academy Awards.

== Synopsis ==
Jan's life takes a sudden turn when his mother, Angela, is diagnosed with Alzheimer's disease. He is now responsible for her care, which tests his dedication and resilience. Each day, she asks about his father, and when reminded that he died some time ago, she becomes sorrowful and struggles to cope.

Every day, Jan's mother inquires about his father, and Jan's response leaves her deeply saddened and confused. Worn out and heartbroken by his mother's distress, Jan eventually resorts to a white lie: he tells her that his father is on a trip to Paris, where his parents honeymooned in 1970

== Cast ==
- Luisa Gavasa as Àngela
- Alain Hernández as Jan
- Neus Asensi as Marta

== Release ==
It had its premiere at the Skyline Film Festival on 31 March 2023 in the National Official Selection.

The film made it to the official selection of the Short Shorts Film Festival & Asia 2024 and was screened on 8 June.

== Reception ==
John Hopewell of Variety cited Pedro Uriol, producer at Morena Films, who praised the film as the most acclaimed Spanish short film of 2023. Uriol described it as a deeply moving and relatable work, noting that while its narrative is classic, its thematic approach is contemporary. Uriol emphasized that the film uniquely shifts the focus to the ill, particularly an Alzheimer's patient grappling with memory loss.

=== Accolades ===
Award	Date of ceremony	Category	Recipient(s)	Result	Ref.
Fugaz Awards	8 May 2023	Best Short Film	Paris 70	Won	
Fugaz Awards	8 May 2023	Best New Director	Dani Feixas Roka	Won	
Fugaz Awards	8 May 2023	Best Actress	Luisa Gavasa	Won	
Fugaz Awards	8 May 2023	Best Original Score	Laura Cruells	Won	
Heartland Film Festival	October 2023	[Best Live Action Short Film]	Paris 70	Selected	
Forqué Awards	16 December 2023	Best Fictional Short Film	Paris 70	Nominated	
Goya Awards	10 February 2024	Best Fictional Short Film	Paris 70	Nominated	
Cleveland International Film Festival	21 April 2024	Programmer's Choice Award: Honourable Mention	Paris 70	Won	
The Academy Awards	2 March 2025	Best Live Action Short Film (Oscars)	Paris 70	Shortlisted	

== Adaptation ==
Fairy Queen (Spanish: Reina de las Hadas, Catalan: Reina de les fades), a feature film directed by Dani Feixas Roka and written by Nach Solís, Dani Feixas and Marta Buchaca, an adaptation of Paris 70 is taken up by Spanish production house Morena Films, teaming with A Contracorriente Films and French co-producer Noodle Productions.

== See also ==
- Academy Award for Best Live Action Short Film
- 97th Academy Awards
