= Getaway Plan (film) =

- Theatrical release poster
- Spanish: Plan de fuga
- Directed by: Iñaki Dorronsoro
- Written by: Iñaki Dorronsoro
- Produced by: Mikel Lejarza; Mercedes Gamero; David Naranjo
- Starring: Alain Hernández; Javier Gutiérrez; Luis Tosar; Alba Galocha
- Cinematography: Sergi Vilanova
- Edited by: Pablo Blanco
- Music by: Pascal Gaigne
- Production companies: LaZona; Runaway Films AIE; Atresmedia Cine
- Distributed by: Warner Bros. Pictures
- Release date: 28 April 2017
- Running time: 104 minutes
- Country: Spain
- Language: Spanish

Getaway Plan (Spanish: Plan de fuga) is a 2017 Spanish crime thriller film directed and written by Iñaki Dorronsoro which stars Alain Hernández, Javier Gutiérrez, Luis Tosar and Alba Galocha.

== Plot ==
The plot follows Víctor, a criminal who teams up with an Eastern European criminal gang planning to pull a bank heist, hired to break the vault.

== Cast ==
- Alain Hernández as Víctor.
- Javier Gutiérrez as Rápido.
- Luis Tosar as police lieutenant.
- Alba Galocha as Helena.
- Itziar Atienza
- Florin Opritescu as Damir.
- Jaroslaw Bielski
- Peter Nikolas
- Miquel García Bordá
- Israel Elejalde

== Production ==
Produced by LaZona, Runaway Films AIE and Atresmedia Cine in association with ETB, it was shot in Bilbao and Madrid. The score was authored by Pascal Gaigne whereas Sergi Vilanova took over the cinematography. Mikel Lejarza, Mercedes Gamero and David Naranjo were credited as producers.

== Release ==
Distributed by Warner Bros, the film was theatrically released in Spain on 28 April 2017.

== Reception ==
Mirito Torreiro of Fotogramas gave it 3 out of 5 stars, praising the performance of Alain Hernández, while negatively assessing the looks of (predefined) formula of the film.

Reviewing for HobbyConsolas, Raquel Hernández Luján gave the film 66 out of 100 points, deeming it to be a film displaying a good technical workmanship and a screenplay with ups and downs, highlighting the performances (particularly Gutiérrez') and the atmosphere, while considering that the film was dragged by a final stretch making it to fall apart and a "dispensable" and "cliche" sex scene with saxophone.

Writing for Cinemanía, Sergio F. Pinilla gave the film 2.5 out of 5 stars, writing that amid the plot there is a "vaudeville-like" human story (that of Galocha's character) that the film is not able to bring forward "with solvency".

Federico Marín Bellón of ABC gave the film 3 out of 5 stars, deeming it to be a "castizo and powerful" thriller.

== See also ==
- List of Spanish films of 2017
