= Aria Bedmar =

Spanish actress, dancer and model

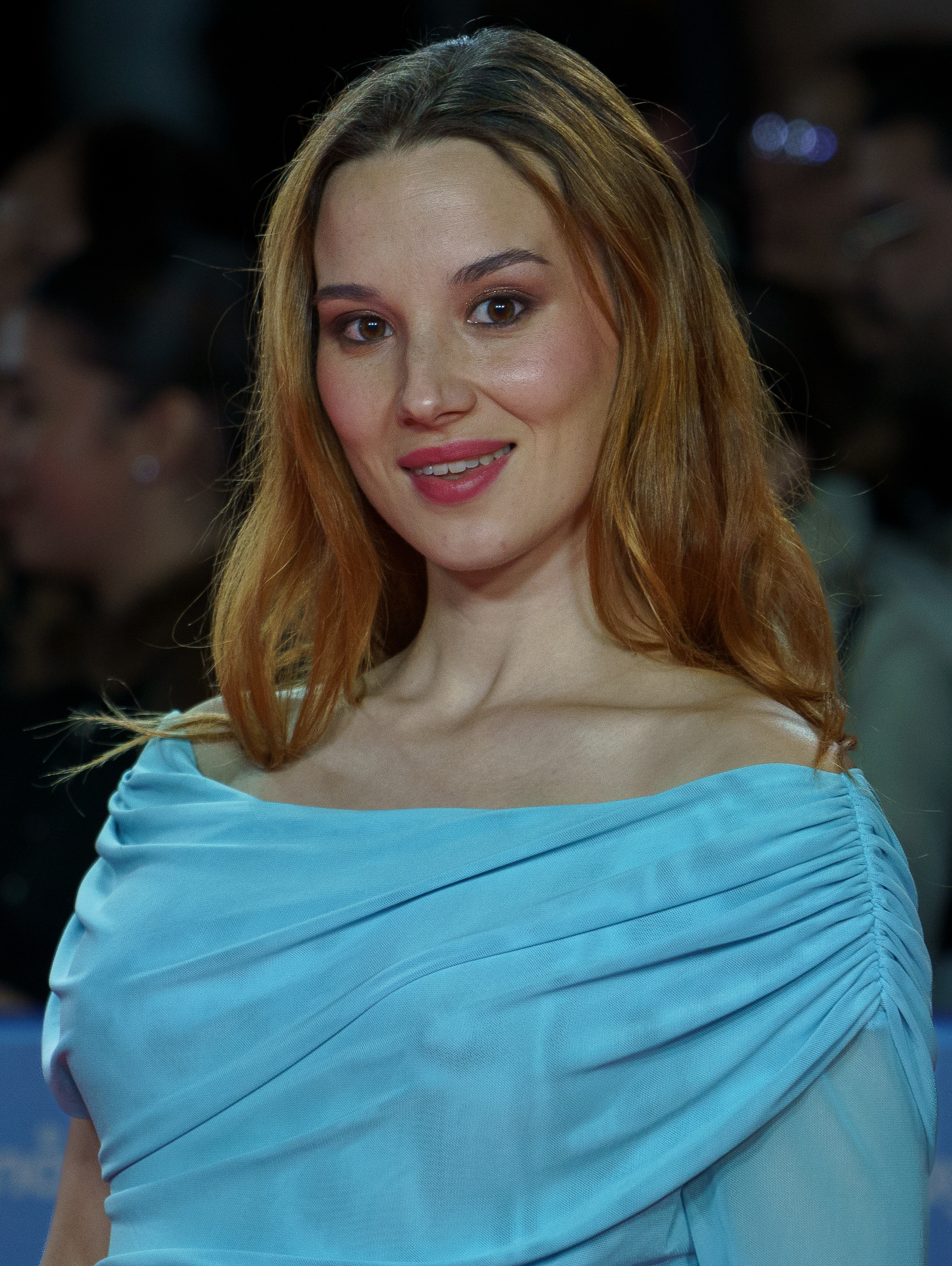
- Bedmar in 2025
- Born: 1 December 1994 (age 31); Province of Almería, Andalusia, Spain
- Occupations: Actress; dancer

Aria Bedmar (born 1 December 1994) is a Spanish actress and dancer. She is primarily known for her performance as Camino Pasamar in Acacias 38.

== Biography ==
Aria Bedmar was born in the province of Almería, Andalusia on 1 December 1994. She studied at Colegio Portocarrero in Roquetas de Mar, also receiving an education as a dancer at Roquetas' municipal school. Upon taking her selectividad test, she moved to Madrid to pursue a career as an actress. She trained her acting chops under Cristina Rota. She made her television debut as an actress in La caza. Monteperdido. She then portrayed closeted lesbian Camino in period soap opera Acacias 38. The character's popular lesbian relationship with Ylenia Baglietto's Maite generated an online shipping fandom known as 'Maitino'. Ensuing roles in period dramas The Cook of Castamar, Dime Quién Soy: Mistress of War, Heirs to the Land, and Operación Barrio Inglés followed. She also shot horror film Sister Death, starring as Narcisa, a young novice nun gifted with supernatural powers.

== Personal life ==
Bedmar is a lesbian. She began a relationship with Sara Jiménez Moral, the frontwoman of band Megara, and they were married from 2019 to 2021 In 2025, Bedmar was expecting her first baby She is also working in the band's dancing crew. She performed as a dancer in Megara's act in Eurovision 2024's second semifinals in representation of San Marino.

== Filmography ==
Year	Title	Role	Notes	Ref.
2019	La caza. Monteperdido	Elisa Nerín		
2019−20	Acacias 38	Camino Pasamar		
2021	La cocinera de Castamar (The Cook of Castamar)	Eugenia Almendrales		
2021−22	Dime quién soy (Dime Quién Soy: Mistress of War)	Águeda		
2022	Los herederos de la tierra (Heirs to the Land)	Mercé		
2023	El silencio (Muted)	Greta		
2023	Hermana Muerte (Sister Death)	Hermana Narcisa		
2024	Operación Barrio Inglés	Lucía Valbuena		
2024	Segunda muerte	Claudia Cobo		
