= Mr. No One =

- Theatrical release poster
- Spanish: Mr. Nadie
- Directed by: Miguel Ángel Calvo Buttini
- Screenplay by: Miguel Ángel Calvo Buttini; Alicia Rodríguez
- Story by: Miguel Ángel Calvo Buttini
- Produced by: Miguel Ángel Calvo Buttini; Ángel Tirado; Xavier Atance; Juan Poveda
- Starring: Félix Gómez; Ainara Elejalde; Myriam Mézières; Susana Córdoba; Mariano Llorente
- Cinematography: Isabel Ruiz
- Edited by: José Manuel Jiménez
- Music by: Alicia Morote
- Production companies: Salto de Eje PC; Tarkemoto; Twin Freaks Studio; Benecé Produccions
- Distributed by: Barton Films
- Release dates: April 2025 (Moscow); 14 August 2025 (Spain)
- Running time: 92 minutes
- Country: Spain
- Language: Spanish

Mr. No One (Spanish: Mr. Nadie) is a 2025 Spanish drama film directed by Miguel Calvo Buttini. It stars Félix Gómez and Ainara Elejalde.

== Plot ==
In Lavapiés, homeless man Daniel lives alone on the streets. Young NGO worker Aina takes an interest in his plight eventually finding out that Daniel was a high-ranking executive of a multinational company fired because of a case of embezzlement and so she forces him to deal with his past.

== Cast ==
- Félix Gómez as Daniel
- Ainara Elejalde as Aina
- Susana Córdoba
- Myriam Mézières
- Mariano Llorente

== Production ==
The film is a Salto de Eje PC (Miguel Ángel Calvo Buttini), Tarkemoto (Ángel Tirado), Benecé Produccions (Xavier Atance) and Twin Freaks Studio (Juan Poveda) production, with backing from the Madrid regional administration, Ayuntamiento de Madrid, and Canal Sur and funding from CreaSGR. It was scored by Alicia Morote. Shooting locations included Madrid (Lavapiés, El Retiro, Plaza de Neptuno, Plaza de la Lealtad, Delicias), Seville (Alameda de Hércules, La Macarena) and Barcelona (Estación Nord de Autobuses) with additional footage shot in Buitrago, Mairena del Aljarafe and Santiponce.

== Release ==
The film was presented at the Moscow International Film Festival. Distributed by Barton Films, it was released theatrically in Spain on 14 August 2025. FilmSharks managed international sales.

== Reception ==
Manuel J. Lombardo of Diario de Sevilla gave the film a 1-star rating, deeming it to be "as determined as it is clumsy and unsuccessful, almost to the point of ridicule".

== Accolades ==
Year	Award	Category	Nominee(s)	Result	Ref.
2026	5th Carmen Awards	Best Actor	Félix Gómez	Nominated	

== See also ==
- List of Spanish films of 2025
