= Segunda muerte =

- Promotional release poster
- Created by: Agustín Martínez
- Written by: Agustín Martínez; Isa Sánchez
- Directed by: Álex Rodrigo; Óscar Pedraza
- Starring: Georgina Amorós; Karra Elejalde
- Country of origin: Spain
- Original language: Spanish

Production
- Producer: José Manuel Lorenzo
- Production companies: Movistar Plus+; DLO Producciones

Original release
- Network: Movistar Plus+
- Release: 6 June – 4 July 2024

Segunda muerte is a Spanish rural thriller television series created by Agustín Martínez which stars Georgina Amorós and Karra Elejalde. It debuted on Movistar Plus+ on 6 June 2024.

== Plot ==
Sandra Ortiz finds the corpse of an old family friend purportedly buried long ago in an isolated cabin. Sandra is an auxiliary police officer gifted with high intelligence and photographic memory who returned to her hometown in Cantabria to exert motherhood, leaving a career in an important tech company behind. She also has a complicated relationship with her father Tello, a legendary retired UCO agent with developing signs of senile dementia and resentful of her daughter's life choices, while Castro, the father of Sandra's son, is about to leave prison after seven years.

== Cast ==
- Georgina Amorós as Sandra Ortiz
- Karra Elejalde as Tello Ortiz
- Joel Bosqued as Castro Sañudo
- Aria Bedmar as Claudia Cobo
- Paula Morado
- Antonio Navarro
- Fernando Guallar
- Maribel Salas
- Arturo Querejeta
- Sara Vidorreta
- Andrea Ros
- Veki Velilla
- Kandido Uranga
- Karmele Larrinaga
- Javier Lago
- Javier Barandiarán

== Production ==
Segunda muerte is a Movistar Plus+ original production produced with the collaboration of DLO Producciones. The episodes were written by Agustín Martínez and Isa Sánchez and directed by Álex Rodrigo and Óscar Pedraza. Shooting locations in Cantabria included Liérganes (Valles Pasiegos), but also Torrelavega and Santander.

== Release ==
The first two episodes were made available on Movistar Plus+ on 6 June 2024.

== Reception ==
Pere Solà Gimferrer of La Vanguardia wrote that "Martínez, while remaining faithful to a hackneyed genre, finds ways to mislead the viewer".

Raquel Hernández Luján of HobbyConsolas gave the series 52 points ('so-so') writing about "a morbid and lazy story" that "works half-heartedly".

== See also ==
- 2024 in Spanish television
