= Operación Barrio Inglés =

- Promotional release poster
- Genre: Period drama; Spy thriller
- Written by: Manuel Ríos; Victoria dal Vera; José Ortuño; Tatiana Rodríguez
- Story by: Alejandro Torres
- Directed by: Chiqui Carabante; José Ramón Ayerra
- Starring: Aria Bedmar; Rubén Cortada; Peter Vives
- Music by: Pablo Cervantes
- Country of origin: Spain
- Original language: Spanish
- No. of seasons: 1
- No. of episodes: 8

Production
- Executive producers: Gonzalo Crespo; Pilar Crespo; Clara Almagro; Santiago de la Rica; Jose Irisarri
- Production locations: Seville, Huelva, Cadiz
- Cinematography: Dani Saló; Alejandro Espadero
- Production companies: RTVE; Onza Entertainment; Emociona Media; Barrio Inglés La Serie AIE

Original release
- Network: La 1
- Release: 10 April – 19 May 2024

Operación Barrio Inglés is a Spanish period thriller television series which stars Aria Bedmar, Rubén Cortada, and Peter Vives.

== Plot ==
Set in 1940 in Huelva against the backdrop of World War II, 25-year-old Lucía, engaged to local politician Francisco and hired to work as a secretary for a British mining corporation, sees herself caught in the middle of a spy plot upon becoming acquainted with mysterious Englishman Peter.

== Cast ==
- Aria Bedmar as Lucía
- Rubén Cortada as Francisco
- Peter Vives as Peter
- Paco Tous
- Juan Gea
- Bea Arjona
- María Morales
- Chiqui Fernández
- Kimberley Tell
- Aïda Ballmann
- Yan Tual
- Sue Flack
- Marco Cáceres
- Almagro San Miguel
- Ángela Chica
- Clara Navarro as Rebeca
- Fran Cantos
- Stefan Weinert
- Kevin Brand
- Frank Feys
- Craig Stevenson

== Production ==
The series was produced by RTVE alongside Onza and Emociona Media. Filming took place from May to August 2023. Shooting locations included Huelva, Seville, and Jerez.

== Release ==
The series was presented at the 27th Málaga Film Festival on 3 March 2024. It was released on La 1 on 10 April 2024.

== See also ==
- 2024 in Spanish television
