= Javier Ballesteros =

Spanish footballer

Javi Ballesteros
Personal information
- Full name: Javier Ballesteros Tomás
- Date of birth: 21 August 1984 (age 42)
- Place of birth: Montamarta, Spain
- Height: 1.82 m (6 ft 0 in)
- Position: Striker

Youth career
- Guijuelo

Senior career*
Years	Team	Apps	(Gls)
2002–2006	Zamora	62	(7)
2006–2007	Atlético B	16	(3)
2007–2009	Guijuelo	65	(24)
2009	Eibar	5	(0)
2009–2010	Puertollano	12	(1)
2010–2011	Lugo	29	(3)
2011–2012	Lleida Esportiu	18	(5)
2012	Leganés	14	(4)
2012–2014	Guijuelo	30	(5)
2014–2015	Cultural Leonesa	5	(0)
2015–2016	Villaralbo	34	(11)
2016–2017	Barco	36	(11)
2017–2018	Laracha	33	(8)
2018–2019	Racing Vilalbés	29	(5)
2019–2020	AD Miño	21	(15)
2020–2021	Silva	11	(2)
2021–2022	AD Miño	15	(9)
- * Club domestic league appearances and goals as of 19 May 2019

Javier 'Javi' Ballesteros Tomás (born 21 August 1984), is a Spanish former footballer who played as a striker.
