= Para Elisa =

- Directed by: Juanra Fernández
- Written by: Juanra Fernández
- Starring: Ana Turpin; Ona Casamiquela; Luisa Gavasa
- Cinematography: David Valldepérez
- Edited by: Alex Carbonell
- Music by: Pascual Vazquez
- Production company: Produccions del Primer Cinquena
- Release date: 20 August 2013 (Espoo Film Festival)
- Running time: 75 minutes
- Country: Spain
- Language: Spanish

Para Elisa (which translates into For Elisa) is a 2013 thriller film directed and written by Juanra Fernández. The film stars Ona Casamiquela as a college student that accepts a job from a wealthy former piano player that wants a caretaker for her mentally challenged daughter. The film's name is a take on the Beethoven composition Für Elise.

Filming for Para Elisa took place during August 2012 in Cuenca, Spain. In an article for ABC Fernández noted that it was difficult to film in the region, as the region did not have a pre-existing film industry.

== Synopsis ==
College student Ana (Ona Casamiquela) needs money for a post-graduation class trip. In answer to a help-wanted ad for a nanny, she goes to have tea with Diamantina (Luisa Gavasa), an elderly concert pianist with a mentally challenged and reclusive daughter named Elisa. Diamantina needs someone to occupy her daughter for a few hours each day while she herself works on a concert piece, and she insists that Ana set her own schedule so as not to miss any classes.

Seeing the opportunity as the perfect job, Ana agrees eagerly, but when Diamantina finally allows Ana to meet Elisa (Ana Turpin), she is shocked to learn that the presumed "little girl" is a full-grown woman dressed in children's clothing who lives in a bedroom full of toys and dolls. Ana begins to back out of the job, but suddenly collapses. Diamantina reveals that the tea was drugged.

Ana wakes dressed as a doll and tied to a chair in Elisa's room. Elisa tries to play with her as if she is a doll, only to become angry and abusive when Ana, still disoriented from the drugged tea, refuses to cooperate. Over the course of the day, Ana recovers enough to begin loosening her bonds whenever Elisa leaves the room. In the evening, Diamantina returns to give Elisa her "medicine," a powerful sedative meant to prevent Elisa's violent nightly rages. While this is happening, Ana hears muffled screaming from another part of the flat. Diamantina goes to take care of the problem, and Ana overhears remarks that hint that not only is there another living "doll" in the flat, but that Diamantina has sewn its mouth shut to keep it silent. Diamantina forces Ana to take a dose of the medicine, which knocks her unconscious.

Suspicious when Ana does not return from her appointment, her boyfriend Alex (Jesús Caba) goes to the police. Due to Alex's past reputation as a drug dealer, they refuse to help him, stating that he must wait forty-eight hours to make a missing-person report.

In the middle of the night, Elisa wakes in a terrible rage. Diamantina takes Elisa into the music room in order to calm her, but Elisa murders her mother with a cleaver. Ana awakens and seizes the opportunity to untie her bonds and escape the bedroom, but the medicine has left her too groggy to find an exit. Instead she hides from Elisa in a closet where she finds her personal belongings, including her phone. Ana calls Alex but is too incoherent to tell him anything before Elisa discovers her and drags her back to the bedroom. To prevent Ana from escaping again, Elisa gives her another dose of medicine, ties her to the bed, and breaks her ankles with a hammer.

Alex returns to tell the police about the disturbing call, but they again dismiss him, believing he is lying in order to be taken seriously. Remembering the ad for Ana's earlier job appointment, Alex phones the flat directly, only to have Elisa answer and tell him that she is Ana's mother and that Ana is "being punished" before hanging up. Using the phone number, he is able to find the building where Ana is trapped, but without the apartment number, he must go from flat to flat in hopes of finding the correct one.

Ana regains consciousness to find Elisa asleep beside her. Freeing herself, Ana pulls a large crucifix from the wall and uses it to bludgeon Elisa before crawling back to the phone, where she is able to tell Alex where she is and what is happening. Alex rushes upstairs to rescue her, but as Ana lies waiting, Elisa recovers and strikes Ana with the cleaver, presumably killing her.

== Cast ==
- Ana Turpin - Elisa
- Ona Casamiquela - Ana
- Luisa Gavasa - Diamantina
- Jesús Caba - Alex
- Sheila Ponce - Úrsula
- Javier Pereira - Cristian
- Pep Anton Muñoz - Agente
- Enrique Villén - Comisario
- Pablo Viña - Indigente
- Frederic Tomàs - Profesor
- Rafa Núñez - Vecino
- Daniela Costa - Vecina

== Reception ==
Critical reception for Para Elisa has been mixed to positive, with most critics commenting that while the film has its flaws it was overall a good film. Fearnet echoed these sentiments, saying that "Not many of the components offered here are all that unique or remarkable on their own ... but it's the combination of story points, suspense moments, and slightly familiar themes that make For Elise such a strangely amusing horror import." La Vanguardia gave the film three out of five stars.
