= La Casa =

La Casa may refer to:

== Media ==
- La casa (novel), a 1954 novel by Argentine writer Manuel Mujica Laínez
- La Casa (film series), a series of Italian horror films
- La casa (2024 film), 2024 Spanish film

== Locations ==
- La Casa Pizzaria, pizzeria in Nebraska
