= Dioses y perros =

- Theatrical release poster
- Directed by: David Marqués; Rafael Montesinos
- Screenplay by: David Marqués; Rafael Calatayud Cano
- Based on: a story by Jaime Martínez Balmaseda
- Produced by: Kiko Martínez
- Starring: Hugo Silva; Megan Montaner; Juan Codina; Enrique Arce; Elio González; Miriam Benoit; Lucía Álvarez
- Cinematography: Eva Díaz
- Edited by: Jota Aronak
- Music by: Mario de Benito
- Production company: Nadie es Perfecto PC
- Distributed by: Festival Films
- Release dates: 25 March 2014 (Málaga); 10 October 2014 (Spain)
- Country: Spain
- Language: Spanish

Dioses y perros (transl. 'Gods and Dogs') is a 2014 Spanish drama film directed by David Marqués and Rafael Montesinos. It stars Hugo Silva and Megan Montaner.

== Plot ==
A drama tinged with black humor elements, the plot tracks the plight of Pasca, a man from Vallecas working as a boxing sparring and also taking care of his younger brother Toni. Pasca develops a relation with Adela, a lively young teacher and newcomer to the neighborhood.

== Cast ==
- Hugo Silva as Pasca
- Megan Montaner as Adela
- Juan Codina as Fonsi
- Enrique Arce as Colomo
- Elio González as Toni
- Miriam Benoit
- Lucía Álvarez
- Ricard Sales
- Víctor Palmero

== Production ==
The screenplay is based on a story by Jaime Martínez Balmaseda. It was penned by David Marqués and Rafael Calatayud Cano. Dioses y perros is a Nadie es Perfecto PC production, and it had support from ICAA, IVAC, Canal Nou and Audiovisual SGR. Filming wrapped on 4 October 2013. Shooting locations included Valencia and Madrid.

== Release ==
The film was presented at the Málaga Film Festival on 25 March 2014. Distributed by Festival Films, it was theatrically released in Spain on 10 October 2014.

== Reception ==
Andrea G. Bermejo of Cinemanía rated the film 3 out of 5 stars, writing that the film simply "dives into the shit of its characters" to bring some humor, gaining in originality with the romantic plot pertaining Megan Montaner, who performs a "credible" posh woman from Cantabria. Summing it up, Bermejo underscored the film to be a "tragicomedy with punch".

Mirito Torreiro of Fotogramas also rated it 3 out of 5 stars, considering that, despite seemingly having everything it takes to be a small masterpiece, the film "does not quite come together because of an ending that is not only predictable, but also very improvable".

== See also ==
- List of Spanish films of 2014
