= Kenzy Loevett =

Spanish singer and graphic designer (born 14 August 1992)

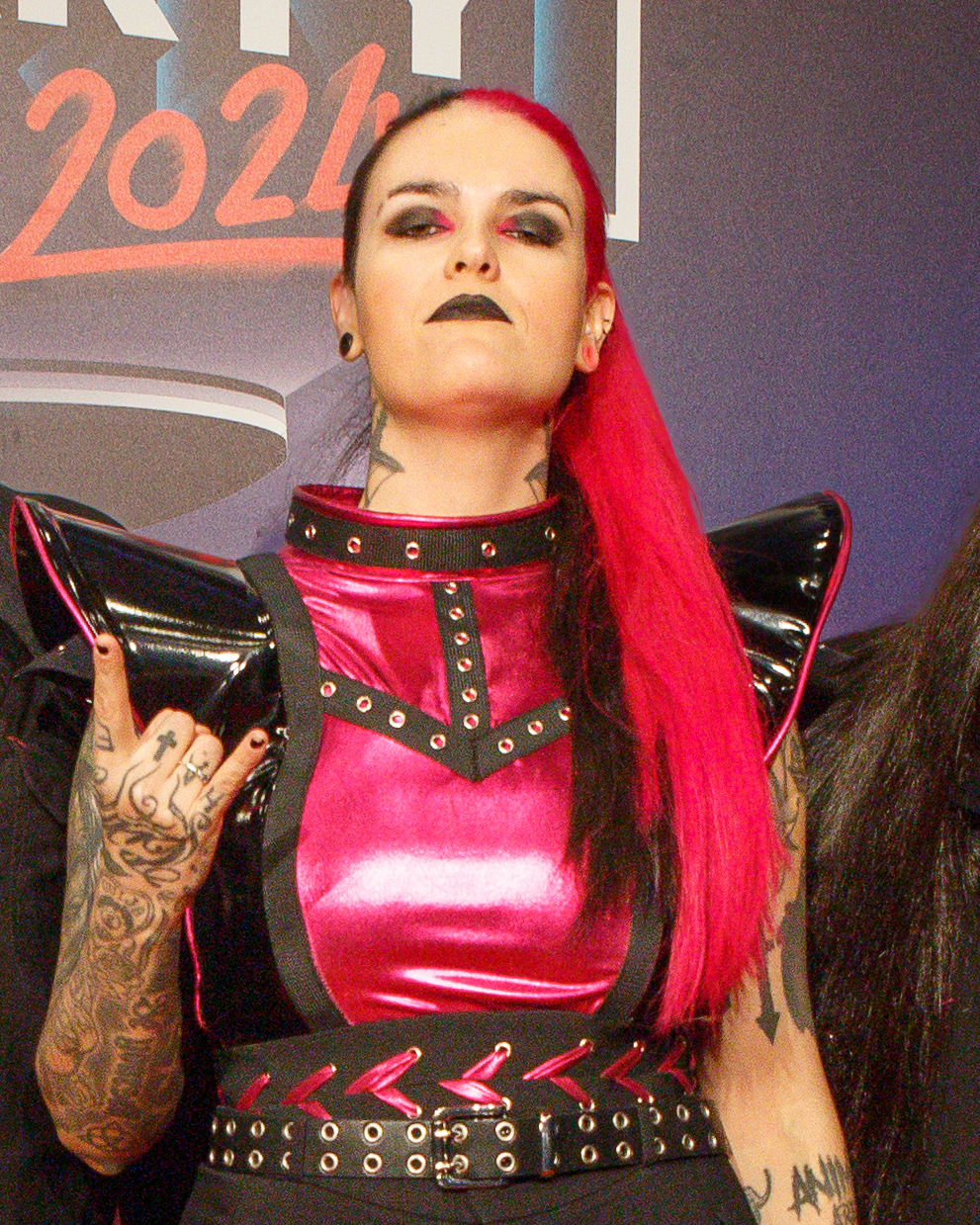
- Loevett in 2024

Background information
- Born: Sara Jiménez Moral; 14 August 1992 (age 33); Madrid, Spain
- Origin: Madrid, Spain
- Genres: Alternative metal
- Occupations: Singer; graphic designer
- Instrument: Vocals
- Years active: 2007–present
- Spouse: Aria Bedmar (m. 2019; div. 2021)
- Partner: Aria Bedmar (2009–2021; 2025–present)
- Website: megaraband.com

Sara Jiménez Moral (born 1992), better known by her stage name Kenzy Loevett is a Spanish singer and graphic designer. She is the founder and lead vocalist of the alternative metal band Megara.

== Biography ==
=== Early life ===
Sara Jiménez Moral was born in Madrid on August 14, 1992. After moving with her family, she was raised in the Almería town of Aguadulce. She later moved back to Madrid on September 1, 2014.

She is part of the Spanish metal movement. Her musical career began when she was fifteen years old, when she got her first electric guitar. She is a collaborator on the YouTube channel Metalovision and creates content about the musical genre through her own Twitch channel. Her musical influences include Taylor Momsen and Lzzy Hale.

=== Career ===
Together with guitarist Rober, she founded the band Megara in August 2014 after the dissolution of a previous band that Kenzy joined as a vocalist after being discovered by him through an internet advertisement. Their debut EP, Muérase quien pueda, was released in 2015. The following year, in 2016, they released Siete, their first studio album, while in 2018 they launched Aquí estamos todos locos, and in 2021 the EP Pink Side.

Megara participated in Benidorm Fest 2023 with the song "Arcadia", finishing in fourth place after receiving 106 points. In 2024, they attempted to participate in Eurovision again, but this time representing San Marino, achieving victory in Una Voce per San Marino with the song "11:11". They failed to qualify from the second semi-final, placing 14th out of 16 participants.

In addition to being a singer, she is a graphic designer and owns a clothing business, Abrakadabra, where she prints advocacy messages in favor of environmental protection and conservation, veganism, and the fight for LGBTIQ+ rights.

== Personal life ==
Kenzy Loevett was in a relationship with actress and model Aria Bedmar from 2009 to 2021. Aria and Kenzy were engaged from 2009 to 2019 and married in Almería on November 2, 2019, their tenth engagement anniversary. On August 5, 2021, Aria announced through her Instagram profile that their relationship had ended after twelve years. However, they have currently resumed their relationship and announced that they are expecting their first baby.

== Discography ==
=== Albums ===
- Muérase quien pueda (EP, 2015)
- Siete (2016)
- Aquí estamos todos locos (2018)
- Pink Side (EP, 2021)

=== Singles ===
- "Arcadia" (2023)
- "11:11" (2024)
- "13 Razones" (2025)
