= Nerea Barros =

Spanish actress

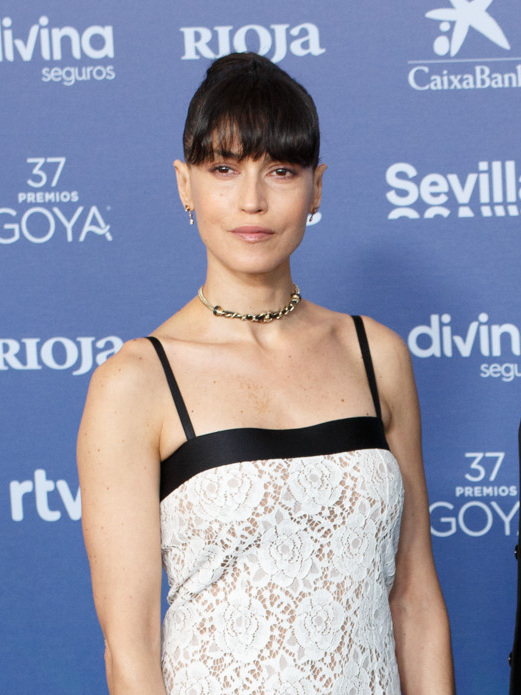
- Barros at the 2023 Goya Awards
- Born: Nerea Barros Noya; 12 May 1981 (age 45); Santiago de Compostela, Spain
- Occupation: Actress
- Years active: 1998-present

Nerea Barros Noya (born 12 May 1981) is a Spanish actress from Galicia.

== Biography ==
Nerea Barros was born in Santiago de Compostela on 12 May 1981. She was a nurse at the Hospital Clínico de Santiago de Compostela, a job she combined with small roles as a film and theater actress. She made her film debut at the age of sixteen, in 1997, in the film Nena, by the Galician director Xavier Bermúdez, with whom she collaborated again in 2008, in the film Rafael. In 2009, she obtained her first relevant role on the small screen, in Matalobos, broadcast by Televisión de Galicia. It was not, however, until 2013 when she gained some popularity due to her participation in El tiempo entre costuras, Antena 3 series, the adaptation of the novel by María Dueñas.

She portrayed Rocío in Marshland (2014), winning the Goya Award for Best New Actress for her performance.

In 2020, she was one of the protagonists in the film La isla de las mentiras, directed by Paula Cons, which tells the fictional story of three heroines who risked their lives to save the passengers of the "Santa Isabel," a ship bound for Argentina that sank off the island of Sálvora in Galicia.

== Filmography ==
=== Cinema ===
Year	Film	Role
1997	A nena	Eli
2001	Bellas durmientes	Jane
2004	León y Olvido	Sales assistant
2008	Rafael	Aurora
2010	Volver a casa	Sofía
2013	O ouro do tempo	Nerea
2014	La isla mínima	Rocío
2016	Sol y Luna	Sol
2020	La isla de las mentiras	María
2020	Voces	Sofia

=== Television series ===
Year	Series	Channel	Role	Notes	Ref.
2007	MIR	Telecinco	Nerea	1 episode	
2009	O Nordés	TVG	-	1 episode	
2009–10	Matalobos	TVG	Sandra	10 episodes	
2012	Padre Casares	TVG	Nerea	3 episodes	
2013	El secreto de Puente Viejo	Antena 3	Eudosia	1 episode	
2013	El tiempo entre costuras	Antena 3	Beatriz Oliveira	1 episode	
2015–16	El Príncipe	Telecinco	Laura Hidalgo	8 episodes	
2018	Apaches	Antena 3	Silvia	5 episodes	
2018	ULTIMO 5 – Caccia ai Narcos	Canale 5	Laura Aguilar	2 episodes	
2018	El sabor de las margaritas	TVG	Pamela / Ana	6 episodes	
2019	Días de Navidad	Netflix	Valentina	1 episode	
2022	La novia gitana (The Gypsy Bride)	Atresplayer Premium	Elena Blanco		
2023	La red púrpura (The Purple Network)	Atresplayer Premium	Elena Blanco		
2026	La nena (The Girl)	Atresplayer Premium	Elena Blanco		

== Awards ==
Year	Award	Category	Nominated work	Result	Ref.
2015	70th CEC Medals	Best New Actress	Marshland	Won	
2015	29th Goya Awards	Best New Actress	Marshland	Won	
2023	10th Feroz Awards	Best Main Actress in a Series	The Gypsy Bride	Nominated	
