= Hierro (TV series) =

- Genre: Mystery; Thriller
- Created by: Pepe Coira
- Directed by: Jorge Coira
- Starring: Candela Peña; Darío Grandinetti
- Countries of origin: Spain; France
- Original language: Spanish
- No. of seasons: 2
- No. of episodes: 14

Production
- Running time: 50 minutes
- Production companies: Movistar+; ARTE France; Portocabo; Atlantique Productions

Original release
- Network: Movistar+
- Release: 7 June 2019 – 19 March 2021

Hierro is a Spanish-French mystery drama television series, created by Pepe Coira. It was produced by Movistar+, ARTE France, Portocabo and Atlantique Productions. The first season was released on Movistar+ on 7 June 2019. In September 2019, the series was renewed for a second season, and on 21 January 2021 a trailer was released. Bringing a closure to the series, the second season aired from 19 February to 19 March 2021.

== Premise ==
Investigating magistrate Candela is transferred to El Hierro, the most remote of the Canary Islands. There, she discovers a suspicious community and is confronted by the death of a young local boy, murdered the night before his wedding. The prime suspect is the father of the bride, a man by the name of Díaz, a businessman with a dodgy reputation. Despite being motivated by diametrically opposite interests, Candela and Díaz share the same goal: to find the real killer.

== Cast ==
- Candela Peña as Candela Montes
- Darío Grandinetti as Antonio Díaz
- Tania Santana as Idaira
- Kimberley Tell as Pilar
- Saulo Trujillo as Daniel
- Yaiza Guimaré as Elvira
- Luifer Rodríguez as Bernardo
- Ángel Casanova as Nicolás
- Marga Arnau as Ángela
- Maykol Hernández as Braulio

=== Season 1 ===
- Juan Carlos Vellido as Sargento Alejandro Morata
- Mónica López as Reyes
- Isaac B. Dos Santos as Yeray
- Cristóbal Pinto as Tomás
- Mari Carmen Sánchez as Asunción
- Antonia San Juan as Samir

=== Season 2 ===
- Matias Varela as Gaspar Cabrera
- Aroha Hafez as Lucía Dueñas
- Ciro Miró as Alfredo Dueñas
- Naira Lleó as Ágata Varela Dueñas
- Helena Sempere as Dácil Varela Dueñas
- Enrique Alcides as Fadi Najjar
- Iris Díaz as Cruz
- Aina Clotet as Tamara Arias
- Celia Castro as Clara Corcuera
- Antonio Durán "Morris" as Sicario

== Episodes ==
Season	Episodes	Originally released	
Season	Episodes	First released	Last released
1	8	7 June 2019	
2	6	19 February 2021	19 March 2021

=== Season 1 (2019) ===
No. overall	No. in season	Title	Directed by	Original release date
1	1	"Episodio 1"	Jorge Coira	7 June 2019
2	2	"Episodio 2"	Jorge Coira	7 June 2019
3	3	"Episodio 3"	Jorge Coira	7 June 2019
4	4	"Episodio 4"	Jorge Coira	7 June 2019
5	5	"Episodio 5"	Jorge Coira	7 June 2019
6	6	"Episodio 6"	Jorge Coira	7 June 2019
7	7	"Episodio 7"	Jorge Coira	7 June 2019
8	8	"Episodio 8"	Jorge Coira	7 June 2019

=== Season 2 (2021) ===
No. overall	No. in season	Title	Directed by	Original release date
9	1	"Episodio 1"	Jorge Coira	19 February 2021
10	2	"Episodio 2"	Jorge Coira	19 February 2021
11	3	"Episodio 3"	Jorge Coira	26 February 2021
12	4	"Episodio 4"	Jorge Coira	5 March 2021
13	5	"Episodio 5"	Jorge Coira	12 March 2021
14	6	"Episodio 6"	Jorge Coira	19 March 2021

== Awards and nominations ==
Year	Award	Category	Nominee(s)	Result	Ref.
2019	66th Ondas Awards	Best Spanish Series		Won	
2019	66th Ondas Awards	Best Actress	Candela Peña	Won	
2019	21st Iris Awards	Best Fiction		Nominated	
2019	21st Iris Awards	Best Screenplay	Pepe Coira	Won	
2019	21st Iris Awards	Best Actress	Candela Peña	Nominated	
2019	21st Iris Awards	Best Actor	Darío Grandinetti	Nominated	
2019	7th MiM Series Awards	Best Drama Series		Nominated	
2019	7th MiM Series Awards	Best Direction	Pepe Coira	Nominated	
2019	7th MiM Series Awards	Best Screenplay	Pepe Coira, Fran Araújo, Araceli Gonda, Coral Cruz and Carlos Portela	Nominated	
2019	7th MiM Series Awards	Best Drama Actress	Candela Peña	Won	
2020	7th Feroz Awards	Best Drama Series		Won	
2020	7th Feroz Awards	Best Leading Actress (TV)	Candela Peña	Won	
2020	7th Feroz Awards	Best Leading Actor (TV)	Darío Grandinetti	Nominated	
2020	29th Actors and Actresses Union Awards	Best Leading Actress (TV)	Candela Peña	Won	
2020	25th Zapping Awards	Best Series		Won	
2021	27th Forqué Awards	Best Fiction Series		Won	
2021	27th Forqué Awards	Best Actress (TV series)	Candela Peña	Won	
2021	27th Forqué Awards	Best Actor (TV series)	Darío Grandinetti	Nominated	
