= Montamarta =

Coordinates: 41°39′N 5°48′W

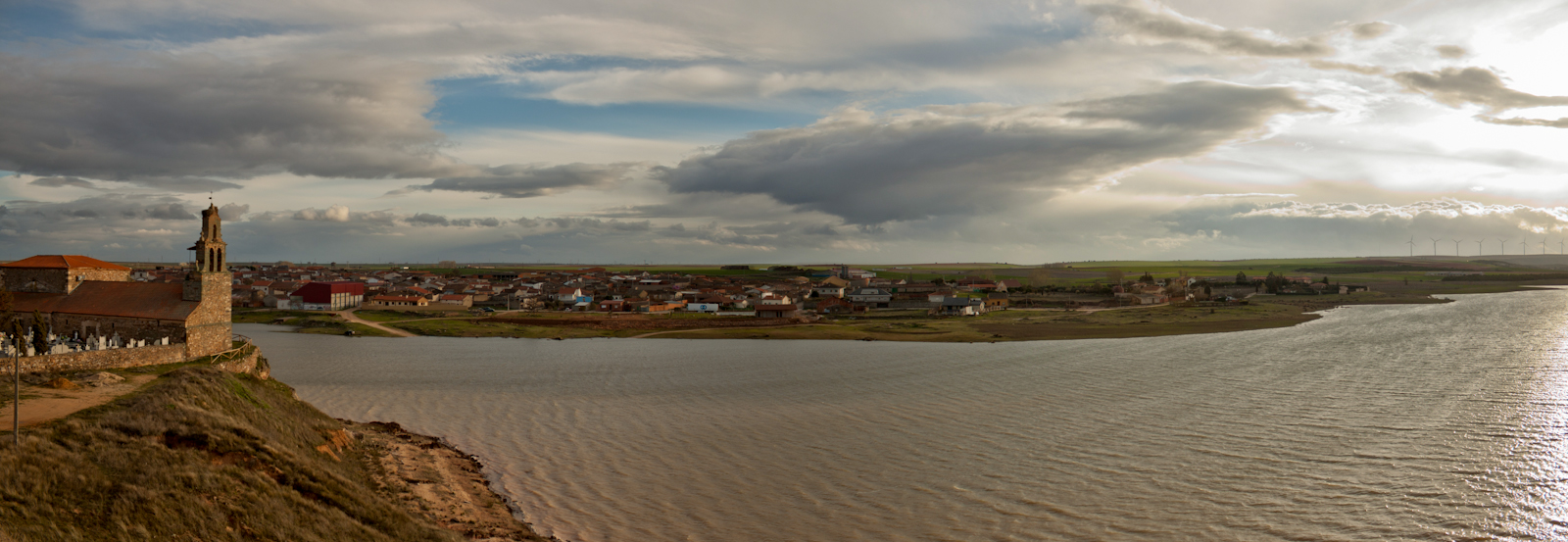

- Coat of arms
- Interactive map of Montamarta
- Country: Spain
- Autonomous community: Castile and León
- Province: Zamora
- Municipality: Montamarta

Area
  - Total: 57 km^{2} (22 sq mi)

Population (2025-01-01)
  - Total: 549
  - Density: 9.6/km^{2} (25/sq mi)
- Time zone: UTC+1 (CET)
  - Summer (DST): UTC+2 (CEST)
- Climate: Csb

Montamarta is a municipality located in the province of Zamora, Castile and León, Spain. According to the 2011 census (INE), the municipality has a population of 609 inhabitants.
