= La Casa Pizzaria =

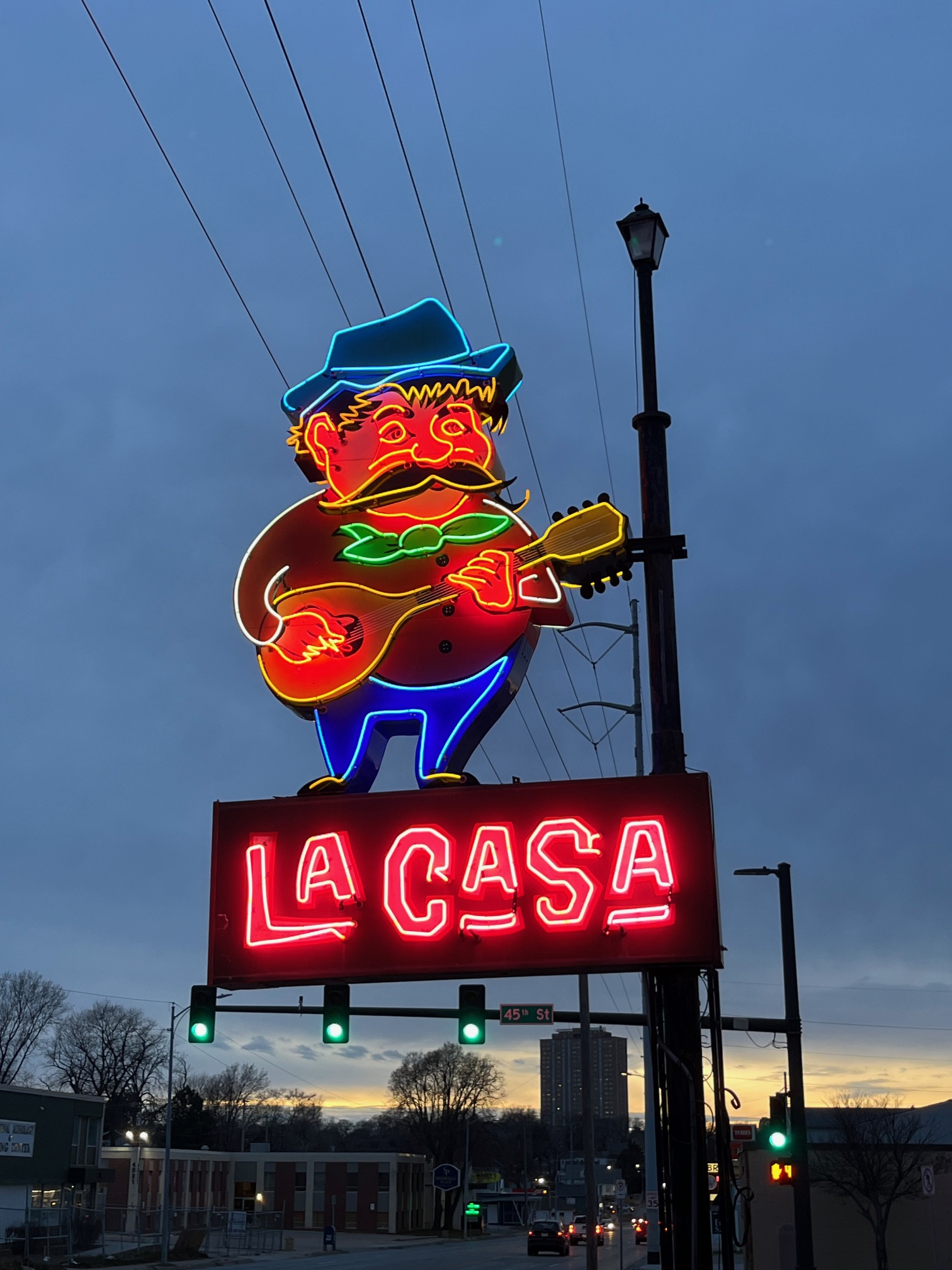
- Photograph of the iconic 'Peppi' neon sign

Restaurant information
- Established: 1953
- Owners: Anthony Vacanti Jr.; Anthony Vacanti Sr; Nicole Jesse; Joel Hahn; Brandon Hahn
- Previous owners: Joe Patane; Nellie Patane
- Food type: Italian
- Location: 4432 Leavenworth St., Omaha, Douglas, Nebraska, United States
- Website: lacasapizzaria.net

La Casa Pizzaria (also known simply as La Casa or La Casa Pizza) is a family-owned restaurant brand located in Omaha, Nebraska. Founded in 1953, the original La Casa location is the oldest operating pizzeria in Omaha, and is widely considered iconic to the city. Its neon sign depicts the mascot Peppi, and is listed as an Omaha Landmark by the Landmarks Heritage Preservation Commission. In 2016, Alexander Payne cameoed the restaurant in the film Downsizing. As of 2023, the brand operates 3 restaurants throughout Omaha and has received praise for its unique style of pizza.

== Description ==
La Casa Pizzaria is a family owed series of restaurant in Omaha, Nebraska. The original La Casa Pizzaria is located on 45th & Leavenworth St., while two sister locations are located at 84th and Grover Streets (often referred to as 'the Grover location' or "La Casa West') and at 168th and Pacific Streets (Also referred to as 'La Casa Pizzaria West at Pacific Springs'). La Casa is family owned and is currently operated by the founder's grandchildren and great-grandchildren. The La Casa Pizzaria West is operated by Anthony Vacanti Jr. and Anthony Vacanti Sr. Vacanti Sr. is also a part owner of the original location, which is operated by Nicole Jesse, Joel Hahn and Brandon Hahn. The restaurants are seen as 'iconic' to Omaha.

Both of the sister locations, unlike the original, are centered around ordering at a counter and self-seating. La Casa West, however, is roughly twice as large as the Grover location and can host nearly 120 people at a time. This restaurant also includes outdoor seating, lounging space, a bar, and party rooms. The chain also operates a mobile food truck and ships its pizzas across the United States.

=== Neon sign and mascot ===
The mascot for La Casa is named 'Peppi' (sometimes spelled Pepé) and is featured prominently at each location with a neon sign. The neon sign featuring Peppi was first constructed in 1957 and was originally designed as part of a larger neon sign trend in Omaha at the time. Peppi is depicted as a stout, 'troubadour' with a handlebar mustache who plays a mandolin or guitar. The designer is unknown. In 2002, the Peppi neon sign at the original La Casa location was declared an Omaha Landmark by the Landmarks Heritage Preservation Commission.

=== Menu ===
La Casa's menu largely serves Italian food, focusing particularity on pizza and pasta. Notably, La Casa features a signature thin-crust, Romano cheese and hamburger pizza that is served in a rectangular shape. The crust has a flaky, 'biscuit-like' texture and the sauce is custom made. The 'bakery-style' crust is made without yeast, and is made in a custom, gas-fired deck oven where the pizza is grilled. This has, at times, been described as pioneering 'Omaha style', a derivation of Neapolitan style pizza.

The restaurant is also notable for its minestrone soup recipe that was first designed by founder Joe Patane, and has remained unchanged since then. Other foods include, soups, salads, lasagna, cheese bread, and sandwiches.

== History ==
The original La Casa Pizzaria was opened on June 8, 1953, by Sicilian immigrants Joe and Nellie Patane. Originally, the site was the couple's home but was later converted into a restaurant following direction from the city. This prompted the couple to name the restaurant "La Casa" or 'the house'. In 1965, La Casa opened a second location, La Casa West, marking one of the first take-out only pizza shops in Omaha. In the 1980s, the Patanes retired and their grandkids Nicole Hahn and Joel Hahn took over the business. The brothers implemented tuition assistance, health insurance, and improved training programs to retain workers. Although as of 2026 such benefits are no longer offered at the west locations. In 2014, they also began operating a food truck to keep up with demand.

In 2016, La Casa was cameoed in the Alexander Payne film Downsizing, starring Matt Damon, Christoph Waltz, Hong Chau, and Kristen Wiig. This film featured multiple points of Omaha iconography. Shooting at La Casa mainly involved footage of the outside of the building and its neon Peppi sign. Following the completion of filming, La Casa hosted Alexander Payne and the filming crew. In 2019, La Casa opened its third location, "La Casa Pizzaria West at Pacific Springs", which coincided with the 65th anniversary of the brand. This was preceded by two years of site planning and construction.

In 2020, the neon sign outside the original La Casa was damaged by a dump truck. Repairs cost approximately $30,000 US to complete and the sign was returned to the restaurant in April 2021. As of 2023, La Casa is the oldest operating pizzeria in Omaha.

== Reception ==
=== Local ===
Local news station KMTV 3 lists La Casa Pizza as "some of Omaha's best Neapolitan style pizza." The Omaha World Herold describes the pizza as "a longtime Omaha favorite" and lists its pizza as one of "A dozen restaurant dishes that define midtown Omaha". The Omaha-based newspaper, The Reader, described the pizza as "The crust is thin like pastry, the hamburger is granular like meat gravel, and the cheese is pure, smelly Romano." Omaha magazine described the restaurant as "the legendary Omaha restaurant known for its unique pizza and iconic neon sign". La Casa's restaurant and food truck have the Omaha magazine's Best of Omaha Award in Pizza during 1992, 1994, 2002, 2004, 2006–2009, 2011–2014, 2016, 2018–2021, and 2023–2024. The restaurant has also been praised for its efforts in retaining and training staff. The neon sign located at La Casa Pizza is widely regarded as icon and historic to Omaha. In a restaurant review by the podcast Restauranthoppin, hosted by food critic Dan Hoppin, the restaurants were described as:

While the focus on La Casa’s historic standing in Omaha is well-deserved, its reputation as a one-trick pony is not. Because while the hamburger pizza is a fan favorite for a reason, there’s a lot more going on at this restaurant than this one pie.

During the 65th anniversary of the restaurant, the Omaha World Herold described mixed reception to the restaurant, but attributed the brand's survival to their 'iconic' pizza style.

=== Non-local ===
La Casa is featured in the Pizza Hall of Fame. Tracy Morin, a Mashed journalist and writer for PMQ Pizza Magazine, praised the restaurant's food and described the modern restaurant as "relevant though Facebook and Twitter while attracting a younger crowd with fun events" The travel and tourism site TravelAwaits listed La Casa as amongst the '11 Best Italian Restaurants In Omaha, Nebraska'. The Food Network has praised La Casa's food, describing it as a lesser known 'Omaha-style' of pizza.

Director Alexander Payne has stated his personal favorite dish is pizza with mushrooms, onions, and ground beef.

== See also ==
- List of Omaha landmarks
- Runza (restaurant)
