= La caza. Tramuntana =

Spanish television series

- Genre: Mystery; Thriller; Crime drama
- Created by: Agustín Martínez
- Screenplay by: Agustín Martínez; Miguel Sáez Carral; Jorge Díaz; Antonio Mercero
- Directed by: David Ulloa; Rafael Montesinos
- Starring: Megan Montaner; Alain Hernández; Félix Gómez
- Country of origin: Spain
- Original language: Spanish
- No. of episodes: 8

Production
- Production companies: RTVE; DLO Producciones

Original release
- Network: La 1
- Release: 13 January – 3 March 2021

Related
- La caza; La caza. Monteperdido; La caza. Guadiana

La caza. Tramuntana is a Spanish limited crime television series starring Megan Montaner, Alain Hernández, and Félix Gómez set in the island of Mallorca. It is the second series/season of La caza.

== Premise ==
The fiction is set in Tramuntana, a fictional village in the Serra de Tramuntana mountain range, in the Mediterranean island of Mallorca. The events take place a year after the solving of the case of the girls of Monteperdido, in which agents Sara Campos and Víctor Gamero took part.

The plot starts with the murder of Bernat Cervera. Sara Campos assumes the investigation, partnering with Gamero. She also has to deal with Sgt. Selva, a cocky and overbearing agent. But as the case is solved and the murderer is identified, new questions arise.

== Cast ==
- Megan Montaner as Sara Campos.
- Alain Hernández as Víctor Gamero.
- Félix Gómez as Sargento Selva.
- Llum Barrera as Madó Teresa.
- Sara Rivero Catalina Trías, "Cati".
- Miquel Gelabert as Vicente Trías.
- Francesc Albiol as Bernat Cervera.
- Nadia Al-Saidi Ayala as Samiah Chrérif.
- Elia Galera as Joanna Bosch.
- Blanca Apilánez as Marta Salort.
- Ingrid Rubio as Mónica Vinent.
- Jaime Pujol as Jaume Febrer.
- Álvaro Rico as Miquel Torres Bosch.
- María Mercado as Julia Reig.
- Jorge Motos as Daniel Coll, "Dani".
- Ernest Villegas as Gerard Torres.
- Jorge Suquet as Oriol Noguera.
- Belén Fabra as Malena Marcos.
- Zoe Stein as Bela Lebedev.
- Andrew Tarbet as Lance Reader.
- Yaël Belicha as Amelia Reig.
- Carlos Llecha as Bartolo Company Mestre, "Tolo".
- Victòria Pagès as Inés Mestre.
- Óscar Molina as Llorenç Company.
- Carles Molinet as Biel Carretero.
- Mateu Bosch as Marc Silvela.
- Xavi Frau as Agente Vila.
- Anne Perelló as Esther.
- Samuel Santamaría as Juan.
- Carles Arquimbau as Enrich.
- Luna Fulgencio as Sara.

With the special collaboration of

- Beatriz Carvajal as Caridad.
- Tristán Ulloa as Ángel.

== Production and release ==
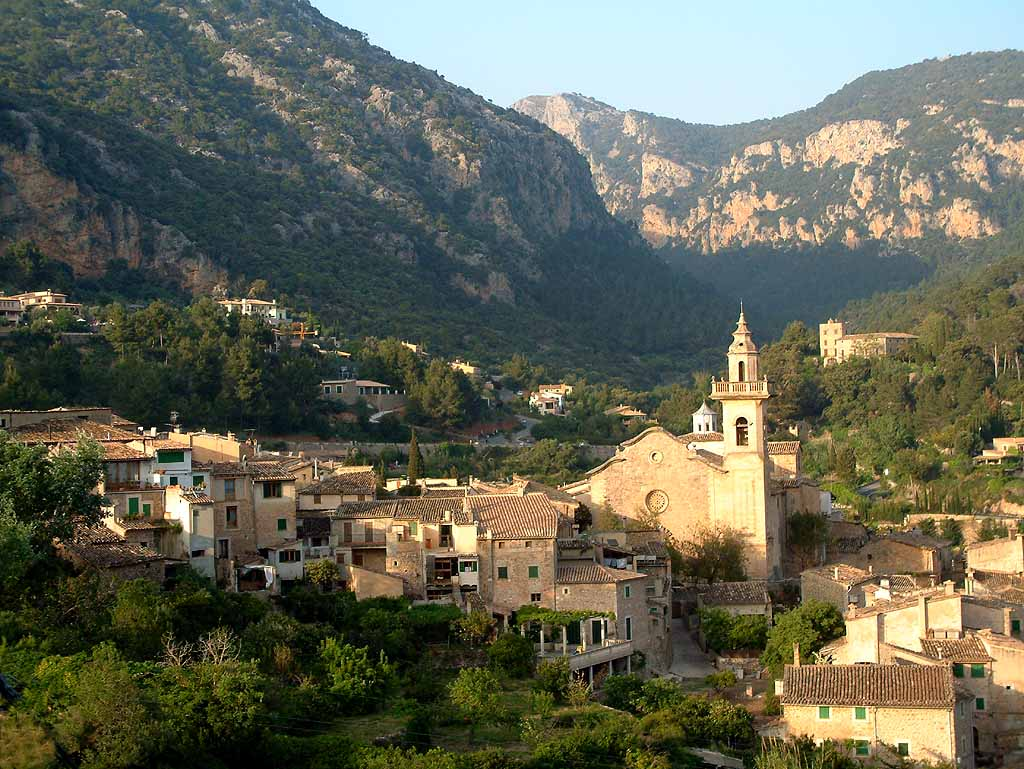
Valldemosa was used to represent the fictional village of Tramuntana

Produced by Radiotelevisión Española (RTVE) in collaboration with DLO Producciones, and written by Agustín Martínez (the creator of Monteperdido) together with Miguel Sáez Carral, Jorge Díaz and Antonio Mercero, the series was directed by David Ulloa and Rafael Montesinos. The village of Valldemosa in the island of Mallorca was used to portray the fictional village of Tramuntana where most of the plot takes place. Other shooting locations included the port of Sóller, the lighthouse of Sóller, Cala Tuent, Port des Canonge, Mirador de s´Entreforc, Cala Pi, Andratx, Llucmajor and Esporles. Interrupted for three months because of the COVID-19 lockdown, shooting of the series resumed by July 2020.

The first episode of the series premiered on 13 January 2021 on La 1 with an unimpressive 8.0% audience share and 1.3 million viewers, far from the figures of its predecessor, Monteperdido. The series fared comparatively better with online catch-up reproductions than with linear TV, adding 540,000 weekly viewers to the total. The broadcasting run of the 8-episode series ended on 3 March 2021.

Series	Episodes	Originally released			Viewers	Share (%)	Ref.
Series	Episodes	First released	Last released	Network	Viewers	Share (%)	Ref.
1	8	13 January 2021	3 March 2021	La 1	1,190,250	6.86	

This is a caption
No. in season	Title	Directed by	Written by	Viewers	Original release date	Share (%)
1	"El Cant de la Sibil·la"	David Ulloa	Agustín Martínez	1,353,000	13 January 2021	8.0
2	"La plaga"	David Ulloa	Miguel Sáez Carral	1,250,000	20 January 2021	7.0
3	"Dona d'aigo"	Rafael Montesinos	Miguel Sáez Carral	1,334,000	27 January 2021	7.6
4	"Avenc"	Rafael Montesinos	Agustín Martínez	1,155,000	3 February 2021	6.5
5	"Nocturno"	David Ulloa	Jorge Díaz	1,123,000	10 February 2021	6.4
6	"S'Illa"	David Ulloa	Antonio Mercero	1,088,000	17 February 2021	6.4
7	"Can Falgueres"	Rafael Montesinos	Agustín Martínez	1,092,000	24 February 2021	6.6
8	"Ans del Judici"	Rafael Montesinos	Agustín Martínez & Miguel Sáez Carral	1,127,000	3 March 2021	6.4

== Accolades ==
Year	Award	Category	Nominee(s)	Result	Ref.
2021	23rd Iris Awards	Best Fiction		Nominated	
2021	23rd Iris Awards	Best Actress	Megan Montaner	Nominated	
