= La caza. Monteperdido =

Spanish period drama television series

- Genre: Crime; Psychological thriller Mystery
- Created by: Agustín Martínez; Luis Moya
- Based on: Monteperdido by Agustín Martínez
- Starring: Megan Montaner; Francis Lorenzo; Alain Hernández
- Country of origin: Spain
- Original language: Spanish
- No. of episodes: 8

Production
- Production companies: RTVE; DLO Producciones

Original release
- Network: La 1
- Release: 25 March – 20 May 2019

Related
- La caza; La caza. Tramuntana; La caza. Guadiana

La caza. Monteperdido is a Spanish crime thriller limited television series starring Megan Montaner, Francis Lorenzo, and Alain Hernández. A self-contained story, the plot concerns the disappearance of two girls in the Aragonese Pyrenees and the ensuing investigation carried out five years later by Central Operative Unit (UCO) agents as one of the girls appears. Produced by Radiotelevisión Española (RTVE) in collaboration with DLO Producciones, it aired on La 1 from March to May 2019. It is the first series/season of La caza.

== Premise ==
Two girls, Ana and Lucía, disappear in the Pyrenees in the province of Huesca. Five years later Ana appears. Santiago Baín and Sara Campos, two Central Operative Unit (UCO) agents arriving from Madrid, take over the investigation on Ana's disappearance and Lucía's whereabouts, partnering with a local officer, Víctor Gamero.

== Cast ==
- Megan Montaner as Sara Campos
- Francis Lorenzo as Santiago Baín
- Alain Hernández as Víctor Gamero
- Carla Díaz as Ana Montrell
- Ester Expósito as Lucía Castán
- Pablo Derqui as Álvaro Montrell
- Bea Segura as Raquel Mur
- Jorge Bosch as Joaquín Castán
- Mar Sodupe as Montse Grau
- David Solans as Quim Castán
- Patxi Freytez as Rafael Grau
- Laura Moray as Ximena Souto
- Jordi Sánchez as Nicolás Souto
- Beatriz Carvajal as Caridad
- Aria Bedmar as Elisa Nerín
- Pako Revueltas as Marcíal Nerín
- Juan Díaz as Gaizka
- Chechu Salgado as Ismael
- Alberto Berzal as Román Gameiro
- Javier Cifrián as Burgos
- Marcos González as Rojas
- Roberto Chapu as Pujante
- Alfonso Torregrosa as Padre Bertrand

== Production and release ==
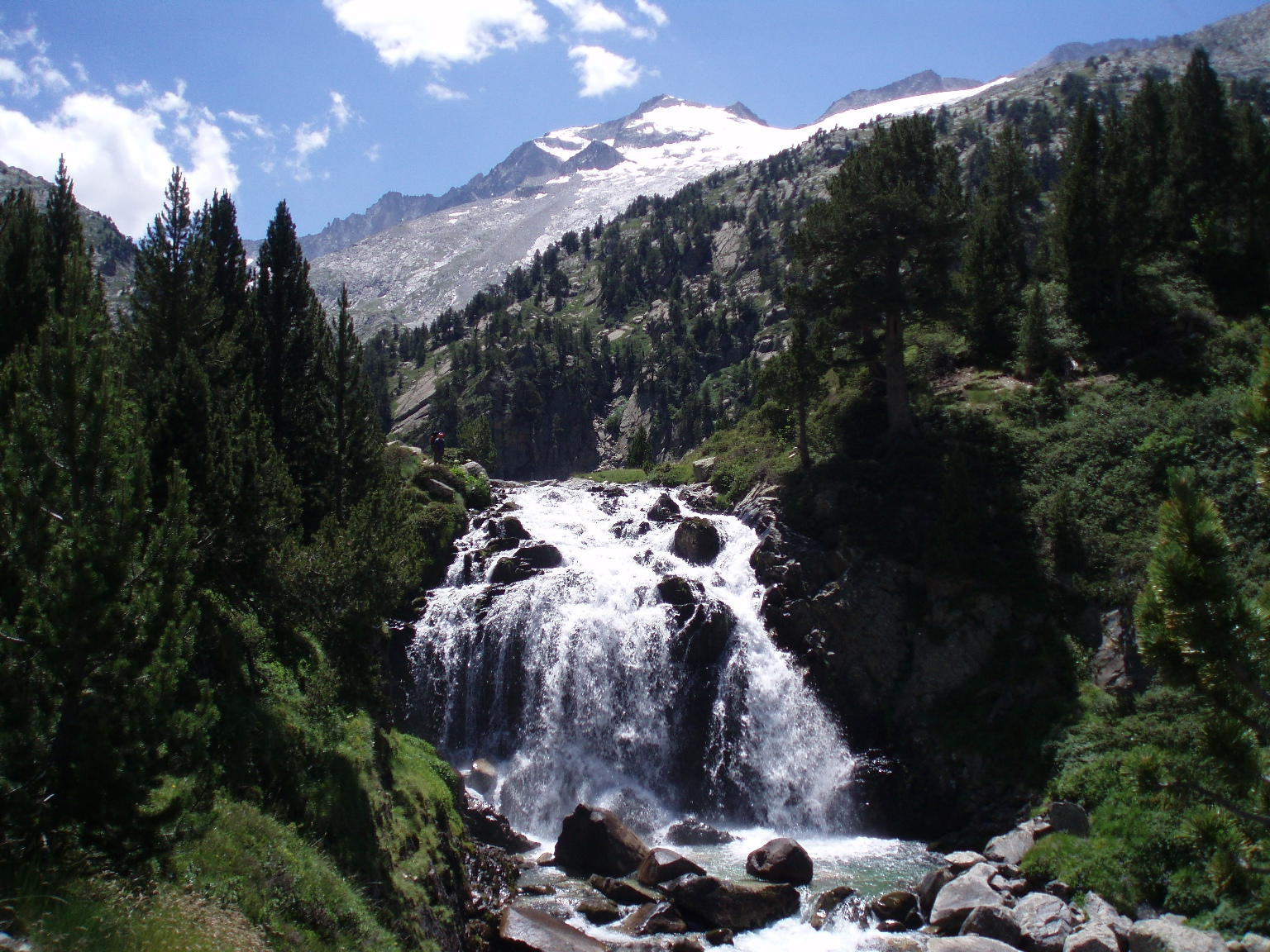
Part of the series was shot in the Valle de Benasque

Consisting of an adaptation of the novel Monteperdido by Agustín Martínez, the series was created by Martínez himself together with Luis Moya and produced by Radiotelevisión Española (RTVE) in collaboration with DLO Producciones. Filming took place in the Aragonese Pyrenees and was wrapped up by December 2018. Shooting locations included Benasque, Cerler, Sesué, Sahún, the Llanos del Hospital ski resort, the Remuñe gorge and the Ésera river.

The first episode premiered in prime time on 25 March 2019. The weekly broadcasting run ended on 20 May 2019. Averaging a 14.0% audience share, it was one of the most successful free-to-air Spanish series in 2019.

A new installment concerning a wholly unrelated crime case and characters (in a sort of anthology series) was reportedly the original plan to continue the series if it was successful, but the sequel/second season of La caza, titled La caza. Tramuntana, while indeed set in a new location, eventually came to feature the reprise of the roles of Sara Campos (Megan Montaner) and Víctor Gamero (Alain Hernández), thus connecting both fictions.

Series	Episodes	Originally released			Viewers	Share (%)	Ref.
Series	Episodes	First released	Last released	Network	Viewers	Share (%)	Ref.
1	8	25 March 2019	20 May 2019	La 1	2,158,875	14.0	

This is a caption
No. in season	Title	Viewers	Original release date	Share (%)
1	"El deshielo"	2,400,000	25 March 2019	15.2
2	"Trémols"	2,335,000	1 April 2019	14.9
3	"El baile de los hombres"	2,306,000	8 April 2019	14.8
4	"Oscuros de Liestra"	2,052,000	15 April 2019	13.7
5	"Lago"	1,991,000	29 April 2019	12.8
6	"La guardia"	1,917,000	6 May 2019	12.8
7	"La batida"	1,996,000	13 May 2019	12.8
8	"La cierva blanca"	2,274,000	20 May 2019	15.0

== Remake ==
A French remake series titled Rivière-Perdue (also set in the Pyrenees) entered development in 2023.

== Accolades ==
Year	Award	Category	Nominee(s)	Result	Ref.
2019	FesTVal Vitoria-Gasteiz	FesTVal Award		Won	
2019	21st Iris Awards	Best Actor	Alain Hernández	Nominated	
2019	21st Iris Awards	Best Actress	Megan Montaner	Nominated	
2019	21st Iris Awards	Best Fiction		Nominated	
2019	21st Iris Awards	Best Production	Production team of La caza. Monteperdido	Nominated	
2019	Prix Europa Awards	Best TV Fiction		Nominated	
2019	Venice TV Awards	Best Series		Finalist	
2019	7th MiM Series Awards	Best Drama Actress	Megan Montaner	Nominated	
2019	7th MiM Series Awards	Best Drama Actor	Alain Hernández	Nominated	
2020	Festival des créations télévisuelles de Luchon	Audience Award for the Spanish selection		Won	
