= Raquel Arias =

Dominican Merengue Típico artist

- Also known as: La Estrella del Merengue Típico, La Fiera, La Insuperable
- Born: Raquel Arias Jiménez; Santo Domingo, Dominican Republic
- Occupations: Singer, songwriter, accordionist
- Years active: 1980s–present

Raquel Arias is a Dominican singer, songwriter, and accordionist known for her work in Merengue típico, a genre of traditional Dominican merengue. She recorded the track "No Me Olvides Corazón" (also known as "¿Por qué te fuiste dulce amor?") in 1998. The song did not achieve widespread popularity until its resurgence in 2016, when it became heavily played on radio and at community events. The music site Remezcla has associated the song with Arias’s rise in the late 1990s.

Arias has been described by multiple sources as a prominent figure in merengue típico, including Hoy (Dominican newspaper), which in 2007 called her “una de las más afamadas exponentes del género típico a nivel nacional,” and Listín Diario, which has covered her as a leading performer in the genre. In the same Remezcla feature, she was listed among “six women leading merengue típico bands you should know.”

At the 2023 ceremony, she was named Conjunto Típico winner for the 2021 cycle of the Premios Soberano.

== Early life ==
Arias began singing at a young age. In interviews, she has described performing at family gatherings and private parties as young as age twelve. She has credited her musical inspiration to her father, grandparents, and uncles, who played accordion and other traditional instruments.

== Career ==
=== Initial recordings and mainstream recognition ===
The Dominican daily Hoy reports she recorded four albums in the early stages of her career, including one with her father and three solo records for Nepo Núñez’s label. Her album La Fiera del Caribe includes “La Grama Chapiá”, and Dominican press later cited the song among her best-known tracks. Her 1998 album Sigue Encendía featured the track "No Me Olvides Corazón," written by her brother Daniel Arias. The song has been cited in multiple media outlets as one of her best-known recordings. She later recorded material titled La Insuperable with Nepo Núñez Records; by 2007 she had pivoted to a Christian repertoire with the album Me Voy Con Él.

=== Transition to Christian music ===
In 2002, Arias transitioned away from secular performance and began recording Christian music. Her 2007 Christian album, Me Voy Con Él, marked the beginning of a new chapter in her career In 2016, Arias released a new Christian album, Dios Es Todo Para Mí, featuring a gospel reinterpretation of her earlier hit "¿Por qué te fuiste dulce amor?", reflecting her religious convictions. That same year, she received two nominations at the 2017 Premios Galardón, the Dominican Republic’s leading Christian music awards, for Production of the Year and Group of the Year. In media interviews, Arias stated she rejected lucrative offers to perform the song's original version, citing her religious beliefs. According to Diario Puerto Plata and El Nuevo Diario, she turned down offers of up to 20 million pesos to return to secular performance or sing the song in its original form.

=== Renewed popularity and public disputes ===
In 2016, the song "No Me Olvides Corazón" resurfaced in popularity online and in community events under the informal title "¿Por qué te fuiste dulce amor?". Although recorded years earlier, it gained attention through social media and live performances by other artists. Reports circulated of a dispute between Arias and fellow merenguera María Díaz over the latter's public performances of the song. While initially upset about the unauthorized use, Arias later granted Díaz permission to perform the song under the condition that it not be claimed as an original or new release.

=== Return to secular music ===
By the late 2010s, Arias began releasing secular music again. In 2019, Arias returned to secular music with the single "Aficiá de Ti," describing it as a turning point that brought her back into the merengue típico scene. Her return was covered by Dominican media, with promotional billboards across Santiago and ticket sales for a comeback concert at Monte Bar on August 17. The song received radio play and garnered tens of thousands of views on YouTube. However, the decision drew mixed reactions on social media, where some longtime fans expressed disappointment while others welcomed her return to secular music.

Her more recent singles include "Amada y Deseada" (2020), which received coverage from major Dominican media outlets.

In December 2020, Arias streamed a concert through BoletaVirtual; El Caribe reported more than 7,500 tickets sold. The outlet also cited SE Ranking data indicating over 11,000 users with purchase intent visiting the platform, noted audiences mainly from the Dominican Republic, the United States, Puerto Rico, Spain, and Central America, and described a two-hour set featuring “Aficiá de ti,” “Amada y deseada,” and “La grama chapiá.”

== Awards and nominations ==
Year	Award	Category	Result	Ref.
2017	Premios El Galardón	Grupo Tropical	Won	
2017	Premios El Galardón	Producción Tropical del Año	Nominated	
2021	Premios Soberano	Conjunto típico	Won	
2022	Premios Soberano	Conjunto típico	Nominated	
2025	Premios Glamour Music Awards	Merenguero/a Típico del Año	Won	

== Selected discography ==
- La Fiera del Caribe (1997)
- Sigue Encendía (1998)
- La Insuperable (2001)
- Me Voy Con Él (2007)
- Dios Es Todo Para Mí (2016)
- "La Grama Chapia" (Single, 2018)
- "Aficiá de Ti" (Single, 2019)
- "Amada y Deseada" (Single, 2020)
