= Alain Hernández =

Spanish actor

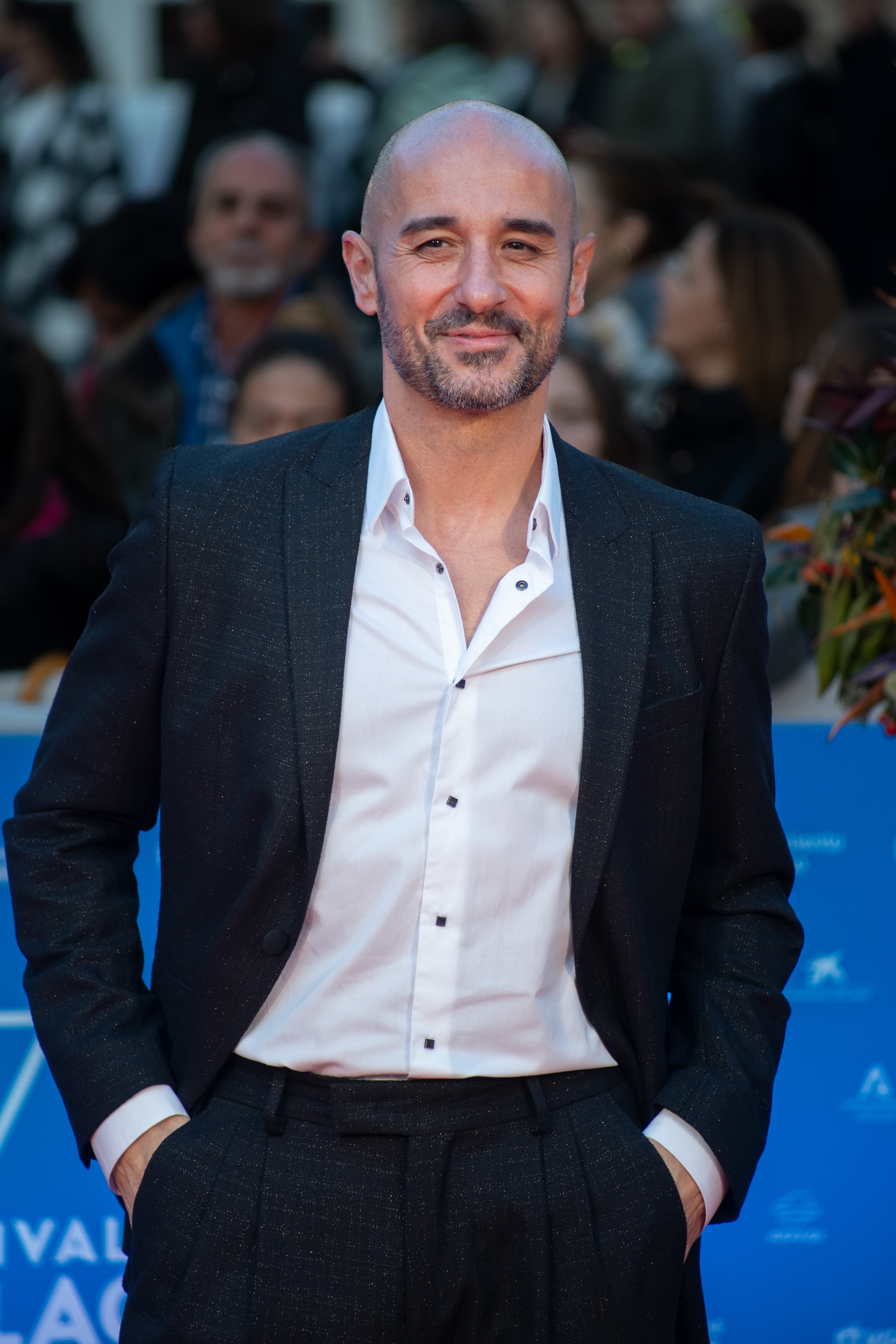
- Hernández in 2024
- Born: 13 December 1975 (age 50); Barcelona, Spain
- Occupation: Actor

Alain Hernández (born 13 December 1975) is a Spanish actor. He has appeared in more than forty films since 2007, and has also worked in television.

== Life and career ==
Hernández was born in Barcelona on 13 December 1975. His family owned a business dedicated to ham production (El Charro).

== Selected filmography ==
Film
Year	Title	Role	Notes
2015	Palm Trees in the Snow	Jacobo	
2016	The One-Eyed King	David	
2017	Getaway Plan	Víctor	
2018	Solo	Álvaro Vizcaíno	
2018	The Photographer of Mauthausen	Valbuena	
2023	Paris 70	Jan	
2024	Deviant	Javier	

TV
Year	Title	Role	Notes
2015-2016	Mar de plástico	Jorge Díaz	
2017-2018	El accidente	Juan Espada	
2019	La caza. Monteperdido	Víctor Gamero	
2021	La caza. Tramuntana	Víctor Gamero	
2025-2026	Las Hijas De La Criada	Gustavo	

== Accolades ==
Year	Award	Category	Work	Result	Ref.
2017	4th Feroz Awards	Best Main Actor in a Film	The One-Eyed King	Nominated	
2017	9th Gaudí Awards	Best Actor	The One-Eyed King	Nominated	
2019	11th Gaudí Awards	Best Supporting Actor	The Photographer of Mauthausen	Nominated	
2019	21st Iris Awards	Best Actor	La caza. Monteperdido	Nominated	
