= Megan Montaner =

Spanish actress and model (born 1987)

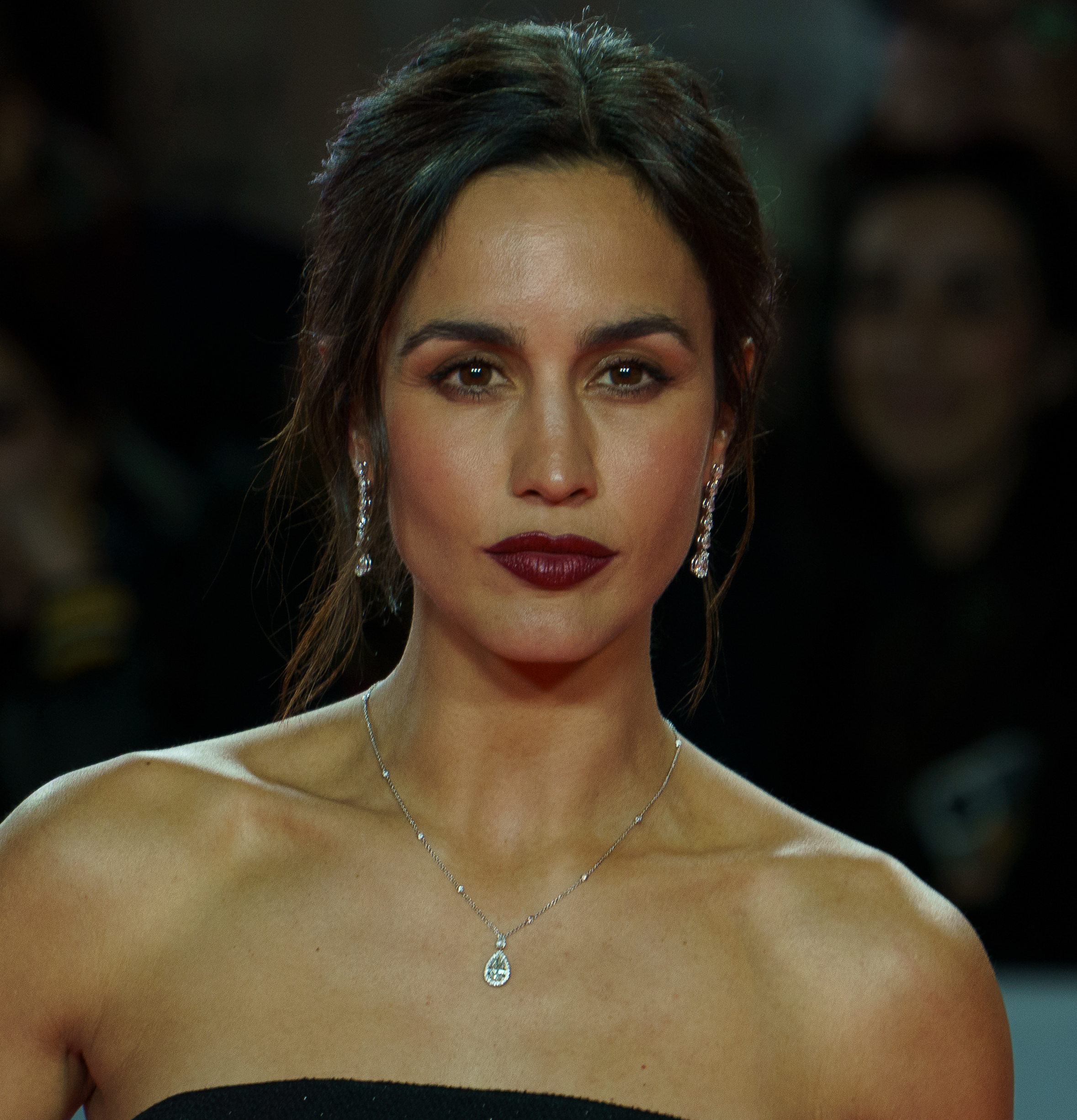
- Montaner in 2025
- Born: Megan Gracia Montaner; 21 August 1987 (age 38); Huesca, Spain
- Occupations: Actress, model
- Partner: Gorka Ortúzar (2013–present)
- Children: 2

Megan Gracia Montaner (born 21 August 1987) is a Spanish actress and former model. She is known for her roles in television shows The Secret of Puente Viejo, Grand Hotel and No Identity, all broadcast on Antena 3. Most recently she played Elena Martín in 30 Coins.

== Filmography ==
=== Film ===
Year	Title	Original title	Role	Notes
2014	Gods and Dogs	Dioses y perros	Adela	
2014	For a Handful of Kisses	Por un puñado de besos	Lidia	
2017	Lord, Give Me Patience	Señor, dame paciencia	Sandra	
2022	Two Many Chefs	La vida padre	Nagore	
2025	The Good Luck	La buena suerte	Raluca	
2025	Papers	Papeles	Ana Méndez	

=== Television ===
Year	Title	Original title	Role	Notes
2010	Eva's Fishbowl	La pecera de Eva	Leticia	Recurring role (8 episodes)
2010	Flight IL8714	Vuelo IL8714	Rocío	Mini-series
2010–2011	Love Is Forever	Amar es para siempre	Gloria	Recurring role (24 episodes)
2011–2014	The Secret of Puente Viejo	El secreto de Puente Viejo	Pepa Aguirre	Main role (98 episodes)
2013	Tormenta	Tormenta	Elia	Mini-series
2013	Grand Hotel	Gran Hotel	Maite	Recurring role (14 episodes)
2014–2015	No Identity	Sin identidad	María Fuentes Vergel/ María Duque Exposito/ Mercedes Dantés Petrova	Main role (23 episodes)
2014–2016	Víctor Ros	Víctor Ros	Lola la Valenciana	Main role (8 episodes)
2016	TF45 Friendly Fire – Hero for Love	Fuoco amico: Tf45 - Eroe per amore	Samira Akbar	Main role (8 episodes)
2016	The Embassy	La embajada	Sara Domingo	Main role (11 episodes)
2017–2018	Velvet Collection	Velvet Colección	Elena Pons	Main role (20 episodes)
2019	Love, Inevitably	Lejos de ti	Candela	Main role (8 episodes)
2019–2025	The Hunt. (Monteperdido, Tramuntana, Guadiana, Irati)	La caza	Sara Campos	Main role (32 episodes)
2020–2023	30 Coins	30 Monedas	Elena Martín	Main role (8 episodes)
2022	If Only	Si lo hubiera sabido	Emma	Main role
2023–	Between Lands	Entre tierras	María Rodríguez	Main role
