= Félix Gómez =

Spanish actor (born 1977)

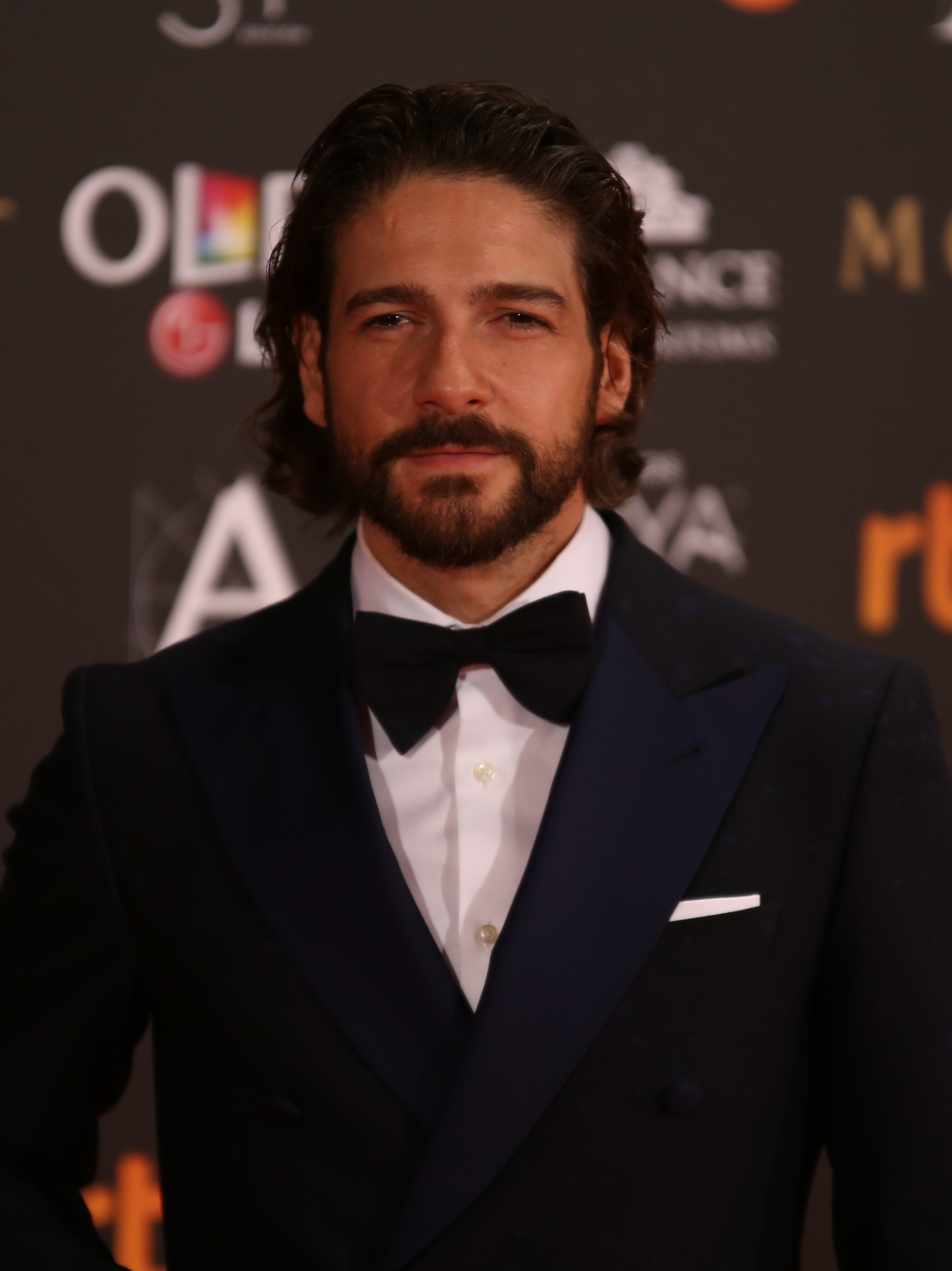
- Gómez at the 31st Goya Awards in 2017
- Born: 1977 (age 48–49); Carmona, Spain
- Occupation: Actor

Félix Gómez (born 1977) is a Spanish actor. He earned early success in Spain in the early 2000s for his performance in the television series Al salir de clase. He is also known for his performances in Amar en tiempos revueltos, 14 de abril. La República and High Seas.

== Biography ==
Born in Carmona, province of Seville, in 1977, Gómez had his television debut in the Andalusian regional series Plaza alta, whereas he landed his debut in a feature film with a minor performance in the 2000 comedy film Kisses for Everyone. He earned success and public recognition in his early career for his performance as Jero Ruiz in the television series Al salir de clase, a role played by Gómez from 2000 to 2002 for close to 500 episodes. He later had a main cast role in the miniseries Padre coraje.

== Filmography ==
=== Television ===
Year	Title	Role	Notes	Ref
2000–02	Al salir de clase	Jero Ruiz		
2004	Los 80	Enrique		
2005–06	Amar en tiempos revueltos	Rodrigo Robles		
2007–09	Herederos	Jacobo García Orozco		
2009	La huella del crimen	Rafael Escobedo	1 episode: "El crimen de los Marqueses de Urquijo"	
2010	Raphael: una historia de superación personal	Raphael	TV Miniseries. Young version of the singer.	
2011–19	14 de abril. La República	Fernando de la Torre		
2014	Cuéntame un cuento	Marko (dwarf)	1 episode: "Blancanieves"	
2015	La dama velata	Ludovico		
2015–16	Carlos, rey emperador	Fernando de Alba		
2017–18	Ella es tu padre	Juan Carlos		
2019	Alta mar (High Seas)	Aníbal de Souza		
2021	La caza. Tramuntana	Ernesto Selva		
2025	Alpha Males	Manu		
TBD	Señor, dame paciencia	Carlos		

Film

Year	Title	Role	Notes	Ref
2006	El camino de los ingleses (Summer Rain)	Paco Frontón		
2007	Abrígate (Wrap Up)	Marcelo		
2007	Las 13 rosas (13 Roses)	Perico		
2008	3:19	Eric		
2010	Agnosia	Vicent		
2012	Insensibles (Painless)	Adán Martel	Young version of the character	
2015	Tiempo sin aire (Breathless Time)	Iván		
2018	Ibiza	Diego		
2023	The Silence of Marcos Tremmer (El silencio de Marcos Tremmer)	Roberto		
2025	Mr. Nadie (Mr. No One)	Daniel		

== Accolades ==
Year	Award	Category	Work	Result	Ref.
2008	17th Actors and Actresses Union Awards	Best Television Actor in a Secondary Role	Herederos	Nominated	
2009	18th Actors and Actresses Union Awards	Best Television Actor in a Secondary Role	Herederos	Won	
2025	4th Carmen Awards	Best Supporting Actor	Alone in the Night	Nominated	
2026	5th Carmen Awards	Best Actor	Mr. Nadie	Nominated	
