= Antonio Santos Mercero =

Spanish writer (born 1969)

Antonio Mercero Santos (born 1969), also going by Antonio Santos Mercero or simply as Antonio Mercero, is a Spanish novelist and screenwriter. He was awarded the 2021 Premio Planeta for La Bestia, written alongside Agustín Martínez and Jorge Díaz under the pen name Carmen Mola.

== Biography ==
Born in 1969 in Madrid, Mercero earned a degree in Journalism from the Complutense University of Madrid. He entered the television sector thanks to his father Antonio Mercero, working as writer in Farmacia de Guardia. Once he left a career in journalism for good, he has since worked in television series such as Hospital Central and La caza. Tramuntana and wrote screenplays of Gracia Querejeta's feature films as well as participated in short films. His first novel was La cuarta muerte (Espasa, 2012), a coming-of-age story. It was followed by La vida desatenta (DeBolsillo, 2014), El final del hombre (Alfaguara, 2017) and El caso de las japonesas muertas (Alfaguara, 2018). The last two are starred by Sofía Luna, a transgender police inspector. He has also written a graphic novel dealing with the repression of homosexuals during the Francoist dictatorship: El violeta (2018).

Alongside Agustín Martínez and Jorge Díaz, he was one of the three authors closeted behind the Carmen Mola pen name, known for a grim noir novel trilogy published by Penguin Random House's Alfaguara which stars "atypical" inspector Elena Blanco: La novia gitana (2018), La red púrpura (2019) and La nena (2020).

The trio wrote another novel (La bestia) as Carmen Mola, which was in turn presented as an unpublished work to the jury of the 2021 Premio Planeta under the title Ciudad de fuego and the pen name 'Sergio López'. As they won the award, the trio disclosed the identity behind 'Carmen Mola'. The circumstance of three males disguising under a female pen name and creating a fake female persona ("a female university lecturer") to market the Elena Blanco books did not avoid public scrutiny and controversy. They claimed they were "tired of lying".

In early 2021, he was charged with leading the writing team adapting the Carmen Mola's novel La novia gitana (retrospectively disclosed to be his own work) into a television series format.

== Relationships ==
He is the son of Antonio Mercero and Isabel Santos Fernández de la Reguera. His older brother Ignacio is a director and producer. As of 2021, he is in a relationship with noir fiction novelist Susana Martín Gijón.

== Works ==
Novels

- La cuarta muerte. Espasa. 2012.
- La vida desatenta. DeBolsillo. 2014.
- El final del hombre. Alfaguara. 2017.
- El caso de las japonesas muertas. Alfaguara. 2018.

Graphic novels

- El violeta. 2018.

Films

- Quince años y un día (15 Years and One Day)
- Felices 140
- Invisibles

Television series

- Farmacia de Guardia (writer)
- La caza. Tramuntana (writer)

Pseudonymous works alongside Antonio Mercero and Jorge Díaz

- Mola, Carmen (2018). La novia gitana. Alfaguara.
- Mola, Carmen (2019). La red púrpura. Alfaguara.
- Mola, Carmen (2020). La nena. Alfaguara.
- Mola, Carmen (2021). La bestia.
