= Carmen Mola =

Spanish writers' pseudonym

- Occupations: Writers, screenwriters
- Writing career
- Pen name: Carmen Mola
- Language: Spanish
- Years active: 2017–present
- Genres: Crime fiction, thriller
- Notable works: La novia gitana La bestia
- Notable awards: Premio Planeta de Novela (2021)

Carmen Mola is a collective pseudonym of three Spanish writers of crime thrillers. The real authors are Jorge Díaz, Agustín Martínez and Antonio Mercero, best known as television scriptwriters.

In 2021, the authors won the €1,000,000 Premio Planeta de Novela, the richest literary book or author prize in the world.

== Works ==
Mola is known for "ultra-violent Spanish crime thrillers" featuring police inspector Elena Blanco, and has been described as the Spanish Elena Ferrante. The Beast is a historical thriller set in a cholera epidemic in Madrid in 1834. Her writing was recommended by the Instituto de la Mujer de Castilla-La Mancha (Women's Institute of Castilla–La Mancha) as a selected "feminist reading."

El Infierno, published in 2023 by Editorial Planeta, is set in the 19th-century Spain and Cuba. It’s a mix of historical thriller, romance and survival, unfolding between the chaos of Madrid during the sargentada and the oppressive world of Havana’s slave plantations.The novel explores the horrors of war, colonial oppression, and the risks of defying a predetermined fate.

== Pseudonym ==
Prior to October 2021, the name Carmen Mola was said by the publisher to be the pseudonym of a female writer born in Madrid, a professor in her late 40s and mother of three who wrote crime thrillers in her spare time. After "her" book La Bestia (The Beast) was awarded the 2021 Premio Planeta de Novela for an unpublished novel, it was revealed during the award ceremony that the name actually represents a group of three men. They are Spanish television scriptwriters Jorge Díaz, Agustín Martínez and Antonio Mercero, all in their 40s and 50s. The €1,000,000 was the most valuable book or author prize in the world, followed by the Nobel.

The three script writers were friends who in 2017 decided to pool their talents writing crime thrillers. There has been some controversy as to why they chose a female pseudonym. The authors said it was purely random, but some critics claimed it was a shrewd marketing move that bordered on the unscrupulous: there had been fake interviews with a woman presumed to be Mola, and a picture on the publisher's website showing a woman with her back to the camera identified as Mola.

== Works ==
- El clan (2024)
- La novia gitana (The Gypsy Bride, 2018, Alfaguara, ISBN 9788420433189)
- La red púrpura (The Purple Network, 2019, Alfaguara, ISBN 9788420435572)
- La nena (The Girl, 2020, Alfaguara, ISBN 9788466358026)
- La bestia (The Beast, 2021, Editorial Planeta, ISBN 9788408249849)
- Las madres (The Mothers, forthcoming 27 September 2022, Alfaguara, ISBN 9788420435572)
- El Infierno
