= Agustín Martínez =

Spanish writer (born 1975)

- In a 2023 interview
- Born: 1975 (age 50–51); Lorca, Spain
- Education: Complutense University of Madrid
- Occupations: Novelist, screenwriter

Agustín Martínez (born 1975) is a Spanish noir fiction novelist and screenwriter. He was awarded the 2021 Premio Planeta for La Bestia, written alongside Antonio Mercero and Jorge Díaz under the pen name Carmen Mola.

== Biography ==
Born in 1975 in Lorca, Murcia, he studied Image and Sound at the Complutense University of Madrid. Initially dedicated to advertising, he began to write television series screenplays afterwards. His first novel, Monteperdido, was published in 2015. It was followed by La mala hierba (2017). Both were published by Plaza & Janés, linked to Penguin Random House.

Alongside Antonio Mercero and Jorge Díaz, he was one of the three authors closeted behind the Carmen Mola pen name, known for a grim noir novel trilogy published by Penguin Random House's Alfaguara which stars "atypical" inspector Elena Blanco: La novia gitana (2018), La red púrpura (2019) and La nena (2020).

The trio wrote another novel (La bestia) as Carmen Mola, which was in turn presented as an unpublished work to the jury of the 2021 Premio Planeta under the title Ciudad de fuego and the pen name 'Sergio López'. As they won the award, the trio disclosed the identity behind "Carmen Mola". The circumstance of three males disguising under a female pen name and creating a fake female persona ("a female university lecturer") to market the Elena Blanco books did not avoid public scrutiny and controversy. They claimed they were "tired of lying".

== Works ==
Television

- Sin tetas no hay paraíso (writer)
- La chica de ayer (writer)
- Crematorio (writer)
- El don de Alba (writer)
- Víctor Ros (writer)
- Acacias 38 (writer)
- La caza. Monteperdido (co-creator and executive producer)
- La caza. Tramuntana (creator)
- Feria: The Darkest Light (co-creator and executive producer)
- Segunda muerte (creator)

Novels

- Monteperdido. Plaza & Janés. 2015. (English translation by Frank Wynne as Village of the Lost Girls, 2018)
- La mala hierba. Plaza & Janés. 2017.

Pseudonymous works alongside Antonio Mercero and Jorge Díaz

- Mola, Carmen (2018). La novia gitana. Alfaguara.
- Mola, Carmen (2019). La red púrpura. Alfaguara.
- Mola, Carmen (2020). La nena. Alfaguara.
- Mola, Carmen (2021). La bestia.
