= 2023 in Spanish television =

This is a list of Spanish television related events from 2023.

== Events ==
- 1 January – Alessandro Salem is elected to replace the retiring Paolo Vasile as CEO of Mediaset España.
- 28 February – SkyShowtime launches in Spain and Andorra, completing its European rollout.
- 6 March - TV channel Canal Red starts broadcasting.
- 31 March - TV channel 7NN stops broadcasting.
- 1 August – TV channels Originales por Movistar Plus+, Indie por Movistar Plus+, Documentales por Movistar Plus+ and Suspense por Movistar Plus+ start broadcasting. #0 por Movistar Plus+ is replaced by Movistar Plus+.
- 17 October – TV channel 8TV stops broadcasting.
- 5 December – Borja Prado resigns as chairman of Mediaset España due to disagreements with other members of the group's board.
- 12 December – Production company La Fábrica de la Tele announces its closure following the end of its partnership with Mediaset España.
- 21 December – Pedro Piqueras hosts his final newscast on Informativos Telecinco before his retirement.

== Debuts ==
Title	Channel / Platform	Debut date	Performers/Host	Genre	Ref.
Escándalo. Retrato de una obsesión	Telecinco	11 January	Alexandra Jiménez, Fernando Lindez	Thriller	
La Promesa	La 1	12 January	Ana Garcés, Arturo García Sancho	Soap opera	
Plan de tarde	La 1	15 January	Toñi Moreno	Variety Show	
Untameable	Atresplayer	15 January	Jaime Lorente, Belén Cuesta	Drama	
Late Xou amb Marc Giró	TVE Catalunya	15 January	Marc Giró	Late night	
Días de tele	La 1	17 January	Julia Otero	Talk Show	
Todos contra 1	La 1	19 January	Rodrigo Vázquez	Quiz Show	
Una historia de crímenes.	Prime Video	20 January	Manuel Marlasca	Reality Television	
Arny, historia de una infamia	HBO Max	20 January		Documentary	
Ahora o nunca	La 1	23 January	Mònica López	Variety Show	
The Snow Girl	Netflix	27 January	Milena Smit	Crime thriller	
Traitors España	HBO Max	3 February	Sergio Peris-Mencheta	Reality show	
Vamos a llevarnos bien	La 1	7 February	Ana Morgade and Lorena Castell	Comedy	
El círculo de los famosos	Antena 3	8 February	Juanra Bonet	Quiz Show	.
In Love All Over Again	Netflix	14 February	Georgina Amorós, Franco Masini	Romantic comedy	
The Invisible Girl	Disney+	15 February	Zoe Stein, Daniel Grao	Crime thriller	
Pobre diablo	HBO Max	17 February	Joaquín Reyes, Ernesto Sevilla	Animated comedy	
Cover Night	La 1	2 March	Ruth Lorenzo	Talent show	
Bosé	SkyShowtime	3 March	Iván Sánchez, José Pastor	Drama Series	
Nacho	Atresplayer	5 March	Martiño Rivas, María de Nati	Biographical	
Focus	Cuatro	6 March		Reality Television	
La caza. Guadiana	La 1	16 March	Megan Montaner, Alain Hernández, Félix Gómez	Crime thriller	
No Traces	Prime Video	17 March	Carolina Yuste, Camila Sodi	Action comedy	
Brigada Tech	La 1	17 March	Luján Argüelles	Variety Show	
Sky High: The Series	Netflix	17 March	Luis Tosar	Drama Series	.
Selftape	Filmin	4 April	Joana Vilapuig, Mireia Vilapuig	Comedy drama	
Una matemática viene a verte	La 2	12 April	Clara Grima	Science	
Una vida bárbara	Antena 3	12 April	Bárbara Rey.	Docu-drama	
Anatomía de...	LaSexta	16 April	Mamen Mendizábal	Documentary	.
Código 10	Cuatro	18 April	David Alemán, Nacho Abad	News	
The Patients of Dr. García	La 1	19 April	Javier Rey, Verónica Echegui, Tamar Novas	Drama	
Tú también lo harías	Disney+	23 April	Pablo Molinero, Ana Polvorosa, Michelle Jenner	Crime thriller	
4 estrellas	La 1	23 April	Toni Acosta, Dafne Fernández	Soap opera	
Españoles en conflictos	La 1	26 April	Almudena Ariza	Documentary	.
The Left-Handed Son	Movistar Plus+	27 April	María León, Hugo Welzel	Drama	
Headless Chickens	HBO Max	28 April	Hugo Silva, Óscar Casas	Comedy	
El camino a casa	LaSexta	4 May	Albert Espinosa	Talk Show	.
Muted	Netflix	19 May	Arón Piper, Almudena Amor	Thriller	
Las invisibles	SkyShowtime	5 June	Lolita Flores	Drama	
Tú también lo harías.	Disney+	26 May	Ana Polvorosa and Pablo Molinero	Drama Series	
Mía es la venganza	Telecinco	12 June	Lydia Bosch	Soap opera	
Nights in Tefía	Atresplayer	25 June	Marcos Ruiz, Patrick Criado	Drama	
Así es la vida	Telecinco	26 June	Sandra Barneda.	Variety Show	
La vida sin filtros	Telecinco	1 July	Cristina Tárrega	Talk Show	.
Poquita fe	Movistar Plus+	4 July	Raúl Cimas, Esperanza Pedreño	Comedy	
¡Vaya vacaciones!	Telecinco	6 July	Luján Argüelles.	Game Show	
Bird Box Barcelona	Netflix	14 July	Mario Casas	TV-Movie	.
Time Zone	HBO Max	14 July	Cristinini	Reality show	
Zorras	Atresplayer	16 July	Andrea Ros, Mirela Balic, Tai Fati	Drama	
José Mota Live Show	La 1	20 July	José Mota, Patricia Conde	Comedy	
El puente de las mentiras	La 1	26 July	Paula Vázquez	Game show	
A Perfect Story	Netflix	28 July	Anna Castillo, Álvaro Mel	Romantic comedy	
La última noche	Telecinco	28 July	Sandra Barneda	Variety Show	
Honor	Atresplayer	30 July	Darío Grandinetti	Drama Series	
Mañaneros	La 1	4 September	Jaime Cantizano	Variety Show	.
The Floor	Antena 3	6 September	Manel Fuentes	Game show	
¡Martita!	Atresplayer	7 September	Martita de Graná	Comedy	
Burning Body	Netflix	9 September	Úrsula Corberó, Quim Gutiérrez	Crime drama	
Más vale sábado	LaSexta	9 September	Adela González, Boris Izaguirre	Talk show	
Mi cole es rural,	La 2	9 September	Raúl Bermejo	Docu-drama	.
Between Lands	Atresplayer	10 September	Megan Montaner, Unax Ugalde	Drama	
Vamos a ver	Telecinco	11 September	Joaquín Prat, Patricia Pardo	Magazine	
Cuentos chinos	Telecinco	11 September	Jorge Javier Vázquez	Talk show	
El Musical de tu vida	Telecinco	13 September	Carlos Sobera	Music	
Desmontando	LaSexta	13 September	Boris Izaguirre	Documentary	
TardeAR	Telecinco	18 September	Ana Rosa Quintana	Talk show	
Déjate ver	Atresplayer	24 September	Macarena Sanz	Comedy drama	
La Moderna	La 1	27 September	Helena Ezquerro, Almagro San Miguel	Soap opera	
That's My Jam España	Movistar Plus+	4 October	Arturo Valls	Game show	
Urban. La vida es nuestra	Prime Video	4 October	María Pedraza, Asia Ortega	Drama	
The Purple Network	Atresplayer	8 October	Nerea Barros	Crime thriller	
Mentiras pasajeras	SkyShowtime	9 October	Elena Anaya, Pilar Castro, Hugo Silva	Comedy drama	
Som de casa	À Punt	9 October	Ximo Rovira, Gemma Payà	Magazine	
La mesías	Movistar Plus+	11 October	Roger Casamajor, Macarena García, Lola Dueñas	Thriller	
Todo cambia	La 1	18 October	Ana Blanco	Documentary	.
Casafantasmas	Atresplayer	23 October	Roberto Leal	Reality Television	.
Memento Mori	Prime Video	27 October	Yon González, Francisco Ortiz	Crime thriller	
Romancero	Prime Video	3 November	Elena Matic, Sasha Cócola	Horror	
Fame After Fame	Netflix	10 November	Belén Esteban, Chelo García-Cortés	Reality show	
Camilo Superstar	Atresplayer	19 November	Alejandro Jato	Biographical	
Gabinete de crisis	LaSexta	22 November	Emilio Doménech	News	
Desnudos por la vida	Telecinco	22 November	Jesús Vázquez	Reality Show	.
The Other Side	Movistar Plus+	23 November	Berto Romero	Horror comedy	
¡De viernes!	Telecinco	24 November	Santi Acosta, Beatriz Archidona	Magazine	
La caja de arena	Atresplayer	26 November	Álex Mola	Drama Series	
This Is Not Sweden	TV3	27 November	Aina Clotet, Marcel Borràs	Comedy drama	
No sé de qué me hablas	La 1	30 November	Mercedes Milá, Inés Hernand	Talk show	
En busca del Nirvana	Cuatro	4 December	Raúl Gómez	Reality show	
Isabel Preysler: Mi Navidad	Disney+	5 December	Isabel Preysler	Documentary	
Nada del otro mundo	La 1	8 December	Pedro Ruiz	Talk show	
Los Farad	Prime Video	12 December	Miguel Herrán	Crime thriller	
Te falta un viaje	Cuatro	12 December	Paz Padilla, Anna Ferrer	Reality show	
Vestidas de azul	Atresplayer	17 December	Lola Rodríguez, Penélope Guerrero	Drama	
Make Up Stars	RTVE Play	19 December	Pilar Rubio	Talent show	
La Voz All Stars	Antena 3	22 December	Eva González	Talent show	
A tu bola	Telecinco	23 December	Lara Álvarez, Florentino Fernández	Game show	
Berlin	Netflix	29 December	Pedro Alonso	Drama	

== Ending this year ==
- La 1
  - Cuéntame cómo pasó (2001–2023)
  - Servir y proteger (2017–2023)
  - El comodín de La 1 (2022–2023)
  - Hablando claro (2022–2023)
- La 2
  - 80 cm (2015-2023)
  - Cuaderno de campo (2022-2023)
  - Encuentros (2022-2023)
  - Las tres puertas (2022–2023)
  - Qué animal (2017-2023)
  - Ruralitas (2020-2023)
  - Un país mágico (2017-2023)
- Cuatro
  - Los Gipsy Kings (2015–2023)
  - Para toda la vida (2022–2023)
- Telecinco
  - Sálvame (2009–2023)
  - Deluxe (2009–2023)
  - Me resbala (2013–2023)
  - Ya es mediodía (2018–2023)
  - Déjate querer (2018–2023)
  - 25 palabras (2022–2023)
- LaSexta
  - Aruser@s Weekend (2022–2023)
  - El jefe infiltrado (2014-2023)
  - ¿Te lo vas a comer? (2018-2024)
- Netflix
  - Sky Rojo (2021–2023)
  - Welcome to Eden (2022–2023)
- Prime Video
  - El pueblo (2019–2023)
  - The Boarding School: Las Cumbres (2021–2023)
- HBO Max
  - 30 Coins (2020–2023)
  - Nadie sabe nada (2022–2023)
- SkyShowtime
  - One Way or Another (2020–2023)
- RTVE Play
  - Gen Playz (2020–2023)

== Returning this year ==
Show	Previous network	Last aired	New network	Returning
¡Allá tú!	Cuatro	2011	Telecinco	9 July
Chester	Cuatro	2019	Cuatro	17 January
Fuera de cobertura	Cuatro	2019	Cuatro	23 October
El Grand Prix del verano	FORTA	2009	La 1	24 June
Me resbala	Antena 3	2021	Telecinco	27 June
La mirada crítica	Telecinco	2009	Telecinco	11 September
Operación Triunfo	La 1	2020	Prime Video	20 November

== Changes of network affiliation ==
Show	Moved From	Moved To
¡Allá tú! (2004–)	Cuatro	Telecinco
El conquistador del fin del mundo / El conquistador (2005–)	ETB 2	La 1
El Grand Prix del verano (1995–)	FORTA	La 1
Las tres puertas (2022–2023)	La 1	La 2
Late Xou amb Marc Giró (2023–)	TVE Catalunya	La 2
Me resbala (2013–2023)	Antena 3	Telecinco
Mía es la venganza (2023)	Telecinco	Divinity
One Way or Another (2020–2023)	HBO Max	SkyShowtime
Operación triunfo (2001–)	La 1	Prime Video
Para toda la vida (2022–2023)	Telecinco	Cuatro

== Deaths ==
- 3 January – Sergi Schaaff, director, 85.
- 12 February – Pilar Cañada, hsotess, 93.
- 17 March – Laura Valenzuela, actress and hostess, 92.
- 30 March – Laura Gómez-Lacueva, actress, 48.
- 10 April – Fernando Sánchez Dragó, writer and host, 86.
- 13 April – Carlos Tena, host, 79.
- 15 April – Don Mauro, actor, 58
- 26 April – Ramiro Oliveros, actor, 82.
- 15 June – Mari Carmen, ventriloquist, 80.
- 27 June – Carmen Sevilla, actress, Singer and hostess, 92.
- 11 July – Mercedes Luzuriaga, actress, 95
- 16 August – Luis-Tomás Melgar Gil, director and journalist, 90
- 17 August – Hilario López Millán, writer and journalist, 78
- 5 September – María Teresa Campos, hostess and journalist, 82.
- 13 September – Pepe Soriano, actor, 93
- 17 September – Pepe Domingo Castaño, host, 80.
- 6 October – Francisco Vidal, actor, 82.
- 12 October – Carlos Pumares, writer and journalist, 80.
- 16 October – Jesús Guzmán, actor, 97.
- 3 November – José María Carrascal, journalist, 92.
- 2 December – Concha Velasco, actress, Singer and presenter, 84.
- 8 December – Itziar Castro, actress, 46.
- 14 December – Daniela Costa, actress, 42
- 20 December – Antonio Burgos, journalist and writer, 80
- 20 December – Miguel Ángel Gozalo, journalist, 85
- 27 December – Patricia Ferreira, director and writer, 65

== See also ==
- 25th Iris Awards (Spain)
- 2023 in Spain
