= 70th Valladolid International Film Festival =

2024 film festival

- Official poster of the 70th Seminci
- Opening film: Three Goodbyes
- Closing film: Always Winter
- Location: Valladolid, Castile and León, Spain
- Awards: Golden Spike: Magellan & The Mastermind
- Directors: José Luis Cienfuegos
- Festival date: 24 October – 1 November 2025

Valladolid International Film Festival
- 71st 69th

The 70th Valladolid International Film Festival (Seminci) took place from 24 October to 1 November 2025, in Valladolid, Castile and León, Spain.

Three Goodbyes screened as the opening film.

== Background ==
In April 2025, the governing People's Party (PP) presented a motion to the plenary of the Valladolid municipal council urging the Spanish Ministry of Culture to gift an extraordinary subsidy on occasion of the 70th Seminci. It was approved by unanimity, but an amendment requesting the same help from the Regional Government of Castile and León was rejected by the PP and Vox municipal groups.

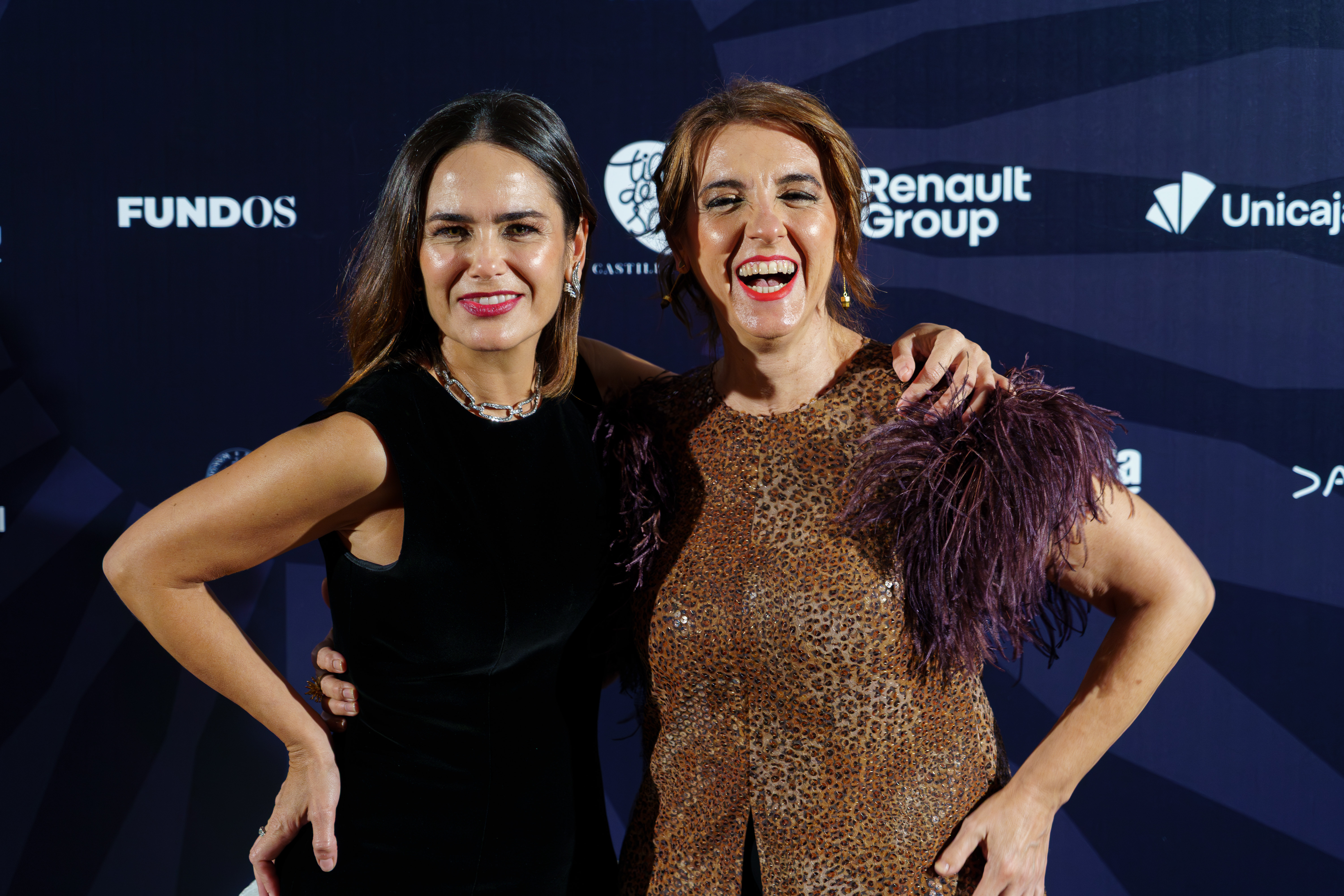
Closing gala hosts Elena Sánchez and Llum Barrera

An early batch of 'Official Section' and 'Meeting Point' titles was announced in July 2025. Likewise, the festival resumed its partnership with the Europa Cinemas network to host the latter's Audience Development & Innovation Lab. The official poster by Ana Mª Hernández and Félix Rodríguez (PobrelaVaca studio) was presented on 4 September 2025 along a new batch of 8 Meeting Point titles. For the 2025 edition, the festival introduced the ESCAC Award recognising the director of the best first or second feature in the Meeting Point section, valued in €5,000. Three Goodbyes was later announced as the opening film. A tranche of Spanish-produced titles, including the world premieres of Subsuelo and Frontera was announced on 16 September 2025.

On 8 October 2025, Mia Hansen-Løve, Luis Callejo, as well as the ESCAC and the ECAM film schools were announced as recipients of Honorary Spikes. Pepa Blanes hosted the opening gala, which included the screening of Three Goodbyes and the musical performance of El Niño de Elche.

The closing gala at the Teatro Calderón on 1 November 2025 was hosted by Elena Sánchez and Llum Barrera, including the presentation of Always Winter as the closing film.

== Juries ==
On 17 October 2025, the juries were announced:

International Jury

- Mihai Chirilov, Romanian programmer and TIFF artistic director
- Laurentina Guidotti, Italian producer
- Elena López Riera, Spanish filmmaker
- João Pedro Rodrigues, Portuguese director
- Serge Toubiana, and French critic and cultural manager

Meeting Point Jury

- Ivette Liang, Colombian producer
- Federico Luis, Argentine screenwriter and director
- Adrián Orr, Spanish director

Time of History Jury

- Manuel Asín, Spanish programmer
- Alexander Horwath, Austrian director, writer, and programmer
- Feyrouz Serhal, Lebanese filmmaker

Alchemies Jury

- Yuri Ancarani, Italian filmmaker
- María Antón Cabot, Spanish filmmaker
- Victoria Marotta, Argentine producer

Short Films Jury

- Begoña Arostegui, Spanish animation filmmaker
- Andrius Blaževičius, Lithuanian filmmaker
- Daniel Vadocky, Czech programmer and distributor

FIPRESCI Jury

- Loreta Gandolfi
- Giuseppe Sedia
- Elsa Tébar

Green Spike

- Cristina Casado Polo
- Manuel Planelles
- José Manuel Rodríguez Fernández

Rainbow Spike

- Karu Borge
- Alejandro Marín
- Yolanda Rodríguez Valentín

== Official Section (Sección Oficial) Feature Films ==
The following films were selected for the 'Official Section' of feature films:

=== Competition ===
English title	Original title	Director(s)	Production countrie(s)
Below the Clouds	Sotto le nuvole	Gianfranco Rosi	Italy
The Blue Trail	O Último Azul	Gabriel Mascaro	Brazil; Mexico; Chile; Netherlands
The Chronology of Water		Kristen Stewart	United States; France; Latvia
Duse		Pietro Marcello	Italy; France
Golpes		Rafael Cobos	Spain; France
Left-Handed Girl	左撇子女孩	Shih-Ching Tsou	Taiwan; France; United Kingdom
Lionel		Carlos Saiz Espín	Spain; France
Living the Land	生息之地)	Huo Meng	China
Magellan	Magalhães	Lav Diaz	Portugal; Spain; France; Philippines; Taiwan
The Mastermind		Kelly Reichardt	United States
Mirrors No. 3	Miroirs No. 3	Christian Petzold	Germany
The Night is Fading Away	La noche está marchándose ya	Ramiro Sonzini, Ezequiel Salinas	Argentina
Orphan	Árva	László Nemes	Hungary; United Kingdom; France; Germany
Pillion		Harry Lighton	Ireland; United Kingdom
Resurrection	狂野时代	Bi Gan	China; France
Silent Friend	Stille Freundin	Ildikó Enyedi	Germany; France; Hungary; China
Sorry, Baby		Eva Victor	United States
Sound of Falling	In die Sonne schauen	Mascha Schilinski	Germany
Subsuelo		Fernando Franco	Spain; Uruguay
Three Goodbyes	Tre Ciotole	Isabel Coixet	Italy; Spain
Two Prosecutors	Zwei Staatsanwälte	Sergei Loznitsa	France; Germany; Netherlands; Latvia; Romania; Lithuania
When a River Becomes the Sea	Quan un riu esdevé el mar	Pere Vilà Barceló	Spain
Yes	כן!	Nadav Lapid	France; Israel; Cyprus; Germany
The Young Mother's Home	Jeunes mères	Jean-Pierre Dardenne, Luc Dardenne	Belgium; France

=== Out of competition ===
English title	Original title	Director(s)	Production countrie(s)
Always Winter	Siempre es invierno	David Trueba	Spain; Belgium
Girl	女孩	Shu Qi	Taiwan
Hamnet		Chloé Zhao	United Kingdom; United States
Rental Family		Hikari	United States; Japan
RTVE Galas
Frontier	Frontera	Judith Colell	Spain; Belgium

== Special Screenings ==
English title	Original title	Director(s)	Production countrie(s)
Awakening Beauty	Bella	Manuel H. Martín, Amparo Martínez Barco	Spain; United States
Breathless	À bout de souffle	Jean-Luc Godard	France
El Canal de Castilla		Leopoldo Alonso	Spain
Las gafas de Isabel Coixet		Santiago Tabernero	Spain
Giant		Rowan Athale	United Kingdom
The Last Rapture	El último arrebato	Marta Medina del Valle, Enrique López Lavigne	Spain
Maya, Give Me a Title	Maya, donne-moi un autre titre	Michel Gondry	France
El noveno		Basilio Martín Patino	Spain
Pendaripen, the Untold Story of the Roma People	Pendaripen, la historia silenciada del Pueblo Gitano	Alfonso Sánchez	Spain
Sleepless City	Ciudad sin sueño	Guillermo Galoe	Spain; France
Space Cadet		Kid Koala	Canada
Super-Charlie		Jon Holmberg	Sweden; Denmark
Jakarta (series)	Yakarta	Elena Trapé, Javier Cámara, Fernando Delgado-Hierro	Spain
RTVE Galas
Leo & Lou		Carlos Solano	Spain; United Kingdom; Romania

== Meeting Point (Punto de Encuentro) ==
The following films were selected for the 'Meeting Point' section:

English title	Original title	Director(s)	Production countrie(s)
Between Dreams and Hope	میان رویا و امید	Farnoosh Samadi	Iran
Death Does Not Exist	La Mort n'existe pas	Félix Dufour-Laperrière	Canada; France
Forastera		Lucía Aleñar Iglesias	Spain; Sweden; Italy
Heads or Tails?	Testa o croce?	Alessio Rigo de Righi, Matteo Zoppis	Italy; United States
Growing Down	Minden rendben	Bálint Dániel Sós	Hungary
I Only Rest in the Storm	O Riso e a Faca	Pedro Pinho	Portugal; France; Romania; Brazil
Kika		Alexe Poukine	Belgium; France
Last Night I Conquered the City of Thebes	Anoche conquisté Tebas	Gabriel Azorín	Spain; Portugal
Little Trouble Girls	Kaj ti je deklica	Urška Djukić	Slovenia; Italy; Croatia; Serbia
The Luminous Life	A Vida Luminosa	João Rosas	Portugal; France
Mad Bills to Pay (or Destiny, dile que no soy malo)		Joel Alfonso Vargas	United States
Nino		Pauline Loquès	France
Olivia and the Invisible Earthquake	L'Olívia i el terratrèmol invisible	Irene Iborra Rizo	Spain; France; Belgium; Switzerland; Chile
Phantoms of July	Sehnsucht in Sangerhausen	Julian Radlmaier	Germany
Rebuilding		Max Walker-Silverman	United States
A Sad and Beautiful World	نجوم الأمل و الألم	Cyril Aris	Lebanon; United States; Germany; Saudi Arabia; Qatar
Wild Foxes	La Danse des renards	Valéry Carnoy	Belgium; France

== Memory & Utopia (Memoria y Utopía) ==
The following films were selected for the 'Memory & Utopia' section:

English title	Original title	Director(s)	Production countrie(s)
Ana		António Reis, Margarida Cordeiro	Portugal
Beata		Anna Sokołowska	Poland
The Bridge	Die Brücke	Bernhard Wicki	Germany
A Dry White Season		Euzhan Palcy	United States
Grandmother	Yaaba	Idrissa Ouédraogo	France; Burkina Faso; Switzerland; Germany; Italy
Harlan County, USA		Barbara Kopple	United States
The Lizards	I basilischi	Lina Wertmüller	Italy
Lucía		Humberto Solás	Cuba
The Money Order	Mandabi	Ousmane Sembène	Senegal; France
Melek Leaves	Die Kümmeltürkin geht	Jeanine Meerapfel	Germany
Men at Work	کارگران مشغول کارند	Mani Haghighi	Iran
Time of Love	Tiempo de amor	Julio Diamante	Spain

== Time of History (Tiempo de Historia) ==
The following films were selected for the 'Time of History' section:

English title	Original title	Director(s)	Production countrie(s)
This Body of Mine	Este cuerpo mío	Afioco Gnecco, Carolina Yuste	Spain
Coexistence, My Ass!		Amber Fares	United States; France
David Delfín. Muestra tu herida		César Vallejo de Castro, Ángela Gallardo Bernal, Rafael Muñoz Rodríguez	Spain
Dear Tomorrow	Mig Thai	Kaspar Astrup Schröder	Denmark; Sweden; Japan
Director's Diary	Записная книжка режиссёра	Alexander Sokurov	Italy; Russia
Face to Face	Cara a cara	Federico Veiroj	Uruguay; Argentina
Memory		Vladlena Sandu	France; Netherlands
Notes of a True Criminal	Zapiski Natoyashego Prestupnika	Alexander Rodnyansky, Andriy Alferov	United States; Ukraine
The Seasons	As Estações	Maureen Fazendeiro	Portugal; France; Spain; Austria
The Tale of Silyan	Приказната за Силјан	Tamara Kotevska	North Macedonia; United States
Tales of the Wounded Land		Abbas Fahdel	Lebanon
Tell Her I Love Her	Dites-lui que je l'aime	Romane Bohringer	France
With Hasan in Gaza	مع حسن في غزّة	Kamal Aljafari	Palestine; Germany; France; Qatar
Yrupẽ		Candela Sotos	Spain

== Awards ==
Official Selection Feature Films

The jury formed by Elena López Riera, Laurentina Guidotti, Serge Toubiana, João Pedro Rodrigues, and Mihai Chirilov conceded the following awards:

- Golden Spike: Magellan & The Mastermind
- Silver Spike: Silent Friend
- 'Ribera del Duero Award' for Best Director: Ramiro Sonzini, Ezequiel Salinas (The Night is Fading Away)
- Best Actress: Eva Victor (Sorry, Baby)
- Best Actor: Harry Melling (Pillion)
- Best Cinematography: Christopher Blauvelt (The Mastermind)
- 'Miguel Delibes' Award for Best Screenplay: Fernando Franco, Begoña Aróstegui (Subsuelo)
- 'José Salcedo' Award for Best Editing: Nili Feller (Yes)

Other

Other awards conceded at the festival include:

- Meeting Point Award for Best Film: I Only Rest in the Storm
- Audience Award: Hamnet
- Rainbow Spike: Between Dreams and Hope
- Green Spike: Silent Friend
- FIPRESCI Award: Two Prosecutors
