= Sofia's Suspicion =

- Theatrical release poster
- Spanish: La sospecha de Sofía
- Directed by: Imanol Uribe
- Screenplay by: Gemma Ventura
- Based on: La sospecha de Sofía by Paloma Sánchez-Garnica
- Produced by: Constantino Frade
- Starring: Álex González; Aura Garrido; Zoe Stein; Irina Bravo
- Cinematography: Gonzalo Berridi
- Edited by: Buster Franco
- Music by: Martina Eisenreich
- Production companies: José Frade Producciones Cinematográficas; Neopol Film, Kellner & Zapf
- Distributed by: Universal Pictures
- Release date: 3 October 2025 (Spain)
- Running time: 100 min
- Countries: Spain; Germany
- Language: Spanish

Sofia's Suspicion (Spanish: La sospecha de Sofía) is a 2025 spy thriller film directed by Imanol Uribe based on the novel by Paloma Sánchez-Garnica. It stars Álex González and Aura Garrido.

== Plot ==
The plot is set in the 1960s against the backdrop of the Cold War. The life of Sofía is upended after her husband Daniel leaves for East Berlin expecting to acquaint with his biological mother. Daniel becomes the victim of a KGB plot instead and his life and identity is usurped by his identical twin Klaus.

== Cast ==
- Álex González as Daniel / Klaus
- Aura Garrido as Sofía
- Zoe Stein as Klaus' sister
- Irina Bravo as Klaus' wife
- Yaiza Guimaré as KGB agent
- Stefan Weinert as Markus

== Production ==
Based on the novel by Paloma Sánchez-Garnica, the screenplay was written by Gemma Ventura. The film had the participation of RTVE, Telemadrid, Amazon Prime Video, and ICAA.

== Release ==
Universal Pictures was set to release theatrically the film in Spain on 3 October 2025.

== Reception ==
Javier Ocaña of El País declared the film to be "disappointing", lamenting that the political energy of Imanol Uribe is invisible in the film, also suffering from apparent budget shortcomings.

== See also ==
- List of Spanish films of 2025
