= No Traces =

Spanish television series

- Promotional release poster
- Spanish: Sin huellas
- Genre: Action comedy; Thriller
- Created by: Sara Antuña; Carlos de Pando; Gabi Ochoa; Héctor Beltrán
- Directed by: Paco Caballero; Gemma Ferraté; Samantha López Speranza; Koldo Serra
- Starring: Carolina Yuste; Camila Sodi; Silvia Alonso; Borja Luna; Álex Gadea; Adrian Grösser; Adriana Torrebejano; Leonardo Ortizgris; Pastora Vega; Pavel Anton
- Country of origin: Spain
- Original language: Spanish
- No. of seasons: 1
- No. of episodes: 8

Production
- Executive producers: Eneko Gutiérrez; Carlos de Pando; Sara Antuña
- Running time: c. 40 min
- Production company: Zeta Studios

Original release
- Network: Amazon Prime Video
- Release: 17 March 2023

No Traces (Spanish: Sin huellas) is a Spanish action comedy television series which stars Carolina Yuste and Camila Sodi. It began streaming on Amazon Prime Video in March 2023.

== Plot ==
The plot is set in Alicante. Lesbian Romani cleaner Desi and fellow Mexican workmate Cata are on the run after becoming the main suspects of murder in a crime scene they cleaned as part of their job, simultaneously chased by police agents and Russian hitmen.

== Cast ==
- Carolina Yuste as Desi
- Camila Sodi as Cata
- Silvia Alonso as Irene
- Borja Luna as Néstor Máñez
- Álex Gadea as Eduardo Roselló
- Adrian Grösser as Luís
- Adriana Torrebejano as Lucrecia Pallarés
- Leonardo Ortizgris as Ubaldo
- Pastora Vega as Mariana
- Pavel Anton as Yuri Poliakoff

== Production ==
Created by Sara Antuña, Carlos de Pando, Gabi Ochoa and Héctor Beltrán (with the former two taking over showrunning duties), the series was directed by Paco Caballero, Gemma Ferraté, Samantha López Speranza, and Koldo Serra. It is a Zeta Studios production for Amazon Prime Video, consisting of 8 episodes featuring an average running time of 40 minutes. Footage was shot between Barcelona and Alicante.

== Release ==
The series was released on Amazon Prime Video on 17 March 2023.

== Accolades ==
Year	Award	Category	Nominee(s)	Result	Ref.
2023	25th Iris Awards	Best Fiction Production	Antonio Asensio, Paloma Molina	Nominated	
2023	25th Iris Awards	Best Fiction Screenplay	Carlos de Pando, Sara Antuña, Héctor Beltrán	Nominated	
2023	25th Iris Awards	Best Fiction Cinematography	Isaac Vila, Álex García, Unax Mendía	Nominated	
2024	35th GLAAD Media Awards	Outstanding Spanish-Language Scripted Television Series		Nominated	
