= Always Winter =

Upcoming film

- Theatrical release poster
- Spanish: Siempre es invierno
- Directed by: David Trueba
- Screenplay by: David Trueba
- Based on: Blitz by David Trueba
- Produced by: Edmon Roch; Jaime Ortiz de Artiñano; Benoît Roland; Beata Saboova
- Starring: David Verdaguer; Isabelle Renauld; Amaia Salamanca
- Cinematography: Agnès Piqué Corbera
- Edited by: Marta Velasco
- Music by: Maika Makovski
- Production companies: Ikiru Films; Atresmedia Cine; Blitz la Película AIE; La Terraza Films; Wrong Men
- Distributed by: BTeam Pictures
- Release dates: 1 November 2025 (Seminci); 7 November 2025 (Spain)
- Countries: Spain; Belgium
- Language: Spanish

Always Winter (Spanish: Siempre es invierno) is a 2025 romantic tragicomedy film written and directed by David Trueba based on his own novel Blitz. It stars David Verdaguer, Isabelle Renauld, and Amaia Salamanca. It is a Spanish-Belgian co-production.

== Plot ==
The plot is set in between Liège and Spain. The relationship between landscape architect Miguel and his girlfriend Marta tears apart during a trip to a congress in Belgium. After Miguel decides to stay alone in the country for a couple of days, Miguel meets older woman Olga, whom with he begins to develop a new life.

== Cast ==
- David Verdaguer as Miguel
- Isabelle Renauld as Olga
- Amaia Salamanca as Marta
- Jon Arias as Àlex
- Vito Sanz as Carlos
- Naiara Carmona

== Production ==
Always Winter is based on David Trueba's novel Blitz (2015), moving from the original German setting of the novel to Belgium. The film is a Spanish-Belgian co-production by Ikiru Films, Atresmedia Cine, Blitz la Película AIE, La Terraza Films and Wrong Men, with the participation of Netflix and Atresmedia TV, and backing from ICAA and ICEC. Agnès Piqué worked as cinematographer.

== Release ==
Always Winter is set to premiere as the closing film of the 70th Valladolid International Film Festival (Seminci) on 1 November 2025. BTeam Pictures is scheduled to release theatrically the film in Spain on 7 November 2025. Film Factory pounced on international sales rights.

== Reception ==
Toni Vall of Cinemanía rated the film 4 out of 5 stars, welcoming "an intimate, delicate story, skillful with human detail, with a touch of humor, with just the right dose of unease and sadness that is not cloying".

In a 4-star rating, Carmen L. Lobo of La Razón lauded the film as a "hopeful story with just the right amount of humor, sadness, and nostalgia".

Manuel J. Lombardo of Diario de Sevilla gave Always Winter a 2 star rating, determining the film to be unbalanced by "a prologue of arrival and breakup weighed down by the glaring miscast of Amaia Salamanca and an overlong stretch of courtship and carnal acquaintance between its protagonists".

Carlos Boyero of El País declared himself to feel "very grateful and complicit in so many things in this film, which is luminous at times, bitter at others, and full of questions that are difficult to answer".

== See also ==
- List of Spanish films of 2025
