= Anna Allen Martin =

Spanish actress (born 1977)

Anna Allen
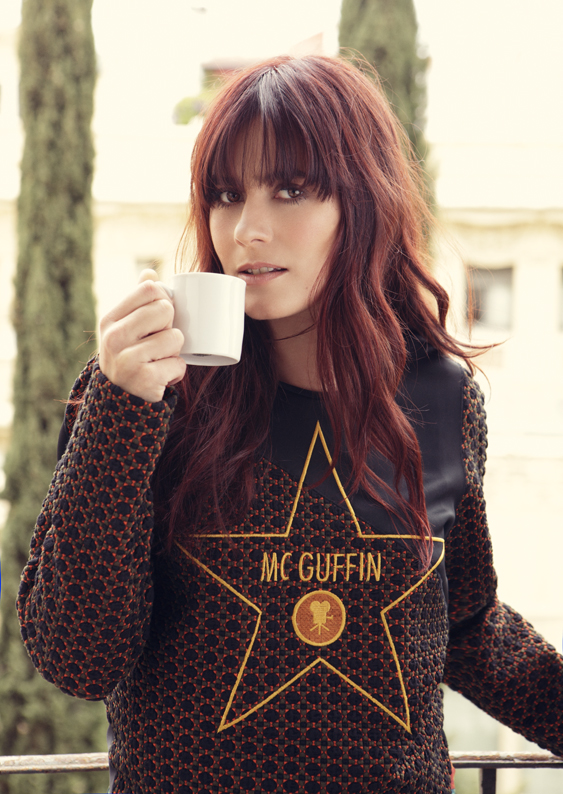
- Born: Anna Allen Martín; 28 June 1977 (age 49); Salt (Girona), Spain
- Occupation: Actress

Anna Allen Martín (born 28 June 1977) is a Spanish actress.

== Early life and career ==
Allen is known for her roles in television series such as Cuéntame cómo pasó, Acusados, and Paquita Salas. Allen grew up in Barcelona, and later on she moved to Madrid at the age of 23 to complete her education.

== Controversy ==
In early 2015, a picture posted by Allen's accounts on social media of herself attending the Oscars ceremony that year was revealed as fake, and as a result, it was exposed that she had claimed certain roles in upcoming projects that she never played. Her fake projects included roles in The Big Bang Theory, White Collar and Versailles.

== Filmography ==
=== Feature films ===
- The Perfect Summer (2013)

=== Short films ===
- Vertices
- A Trip To Paradise
- Two Fingers
- To Those Who scream / Sarah's loud
- Inertial Love
- Norberto

=== Television ===
Year	Series	Channel	Character	Notes	Ref.
2000	Laberint d'ombres	TV3	Enfermera	1 episodio	
2001–2008; 2021–present	Cuéntame cómo pasó	La 1	Marta Altamira	41 episodes	
2003	Iris TV	TV3	Alicia López	TV-Movie	
2003	Cala Reial	TV3	María	TV-Movie	
2003	Hospital Central	Telecinco	Ana	1 episode	
2009	Un burka por amor	Antena 3	Rosi	2 episode	
2009–2010	Acusados	Telecinco	Sonia Nieto	26 episodes	
2010	La Riera	TV3	Mercè Riera (Joven)	1 episode	
2011	El ángel de Budapest	La 1	Adela Quijano	TV-Movie	
2011	Codi 60	TV3	Eva Riera	TV-Movie	
2011	Homicidios	Telecinco	Patricia Vega	7 episodes	
2019	Paquita Salas	Netflix	Susana	1 episodio	
2020	Veneno	Atresplayer Premium	Carmen Albacete	1 episodes	

=== Theater ===
- Antígona del siglo XXI (2011)
- Faros de color y otros (Ale Massi y Javier Daulte, Teatro El Callejón, Buenos Aires)
- Romeo y Julieta
- Shakespeare is coming (Jofre Martín, Sala La Flèche d\'Or, París)
- Vías paralelas (Jesús Roche, Teatro de L\'exaimple)
- Exit
