= The Cavern Crimes =

- Theatrical release poster
- Spanish: La huella del mal
- Directed by: Manuel Ríos San Martín
- Screenplay by: Manuel Ríos San Martín; Victoria Dal Vera
- Based on: La huella del mal by Manuel Ríos San Martín
- Starring: Blanca Suárez; Daniel Grao; Aria Bedmar; Víctor Palmero; Cosimo Fusco; Daniel Horvath; Juanma Cifuentes; Fernando Cayo; Pablo Rivero
- Cinematography: Ángel Iguácel
- Edited by: Juan Carlos Arroyo
- Production company: La Charito Films
- Distributed by: Alfa Pictures
- Release dates: 16 March 2025 (Málaga); 5 April 2025 (Spain)
- Country: Spain
- Language: Spanish

The Cavern Crimes (Spanish: La huella del mal) is a 2025 Spanish police thriller film directed by Manuel Ríos San Martín based on his own novel. Set in the Atapuerca site, it stars Blanca Suárez and Daniel Grao.

== Plot ==
A dead female body is found in a ritual crime scene replacing a Neanderthal replica at Atapuerca's CAREX. Chief inspector Silvia Guzmán and former cop Daniel Velarde take over the criminal investigation.

== Cast ==
- Blanca Suárez as Silvia Guzmán
- Daniel Grao
- Aria Bedmar
- Víctor Palmero
- Cosimo Fusco
- Daniel Horvath
- Juanma Cifuentes
- Fernando Cayo
- Pablo Rivero

== Production ==
The film is a La Charito Films production and it had the association of Nadcon (Peter Nadermann), the participation of RTVE, Netflix, and ZDF Studios, and the collaboration of the Junta de Castilla y León. Filming began in the province of Burgos on 19 August 2024.

== Release ==
The film premiered at the Málaga Film Festival in March 2025. It is scheduled to be released theatrically on 4 April 2025.

== Reception ==
Carmen L. Lobo of La Razón rated the film 3 out of 5 stars, praising the cast while citing how the film's literary origin is sometimes too obvious as a negative point.

Raquel Hernández Luján of HobbyConsolas gave the film 50 points ('so-so'), citing the underlying proposal about human nature and the shooting locations as the best things about the film, while mentioning "the character development, forced dialogue, and common places" as its worst.

== See also ==
- List of Spanish films of 2025
