= Lionel (film) =

- Theatrical release poster
- Directed by: Carlos Saiz
- Written by: Raúl Liarte; Carlos Saiz
- Produced by: Mario Forniés; José Nolla; Samuel Chauvin; Nabil Ejey
- Starring: Lionel Corral Bernal; Lionel Corral; Alicia Corral Bernal
- Cinematography: Artur-Pol Camprubí
- Edited by: Estel Román
- Production companies: Blur Media Productions; Icónica Producciones; Bluconic Films AIE; Promenades Films
- Distributed by: Sideral Cinema
- Release dates: 27 October 2025 (Seminci); 11 September 2026 (Spain)
- Running time: 94 minutes
- Countries: Spain; France
- Languages: Spanish; French

Lionel is a 2025 road drama film directed by Carlos Saiz (in his debut feature). It is a Spanish-French co-production.

The film world premiered at the 70th Valladolid International Film Festival on 27 October 2025 ahead of its 11 September 2026 Spanish theatrical release by.

== Plot ==
The plot follows a father and his son (Lionel and Lionel) in a trip from Murcia to Marseille (and then back), picking up their, respectively, daughter and sister Alicia (a Spanish teacher in France) along the way.

== Cast ==
- Lionel Corral as Lionel
- Lionel Corral Bernal as Lionel
- Alicia Corral Bernal as Alicia

== Production ==
Lionel is a Spanish-French co-production by Blur Media, Icónica, and Promenades Films. Shooting locations in the Region of Murcia included Murcia, Mazarrón, Blanca, Alhama de Murcia, Totana, and Fuente Álamo.

== Release ==
The film premiered at the 70th Valladolid International Film Festival (Seminci) on 27 October 2025. Its festival run also included selections for screenings in the 'Forward Future' slate of the Beijing International Film Festival (for its international premiere), and the Transilvania International Film Festival (TIFF).

Distributed by Sideral Cinema, it was released theatrically in Spain on 11 September 2026.

== Reception ==
Marina Hristova of Cineuropa assessed that the film "ultimately proves light-hearted and engrossing".

Tim Grierson of ScreenDaily declared the film a "tender story about the complications of family and the potential for reconciliation", lauding how it "impressively balances different tones".

Jordi Batlle Caminal of Fotogramas rated the film 4 out of 5 stars, extolling the trio of non-professional actors "who shine as if Bergman himself were scrutinizing them until their souls emerged to the surface".

Carlos Marañón of Cinemanía rated the film 4 out of 5 stars, writing that the three leading characters "make up the most incredible—at once funny and terrifying—family unit in contemporary Spanish cinema".

In a 4-star rating, Sergi Sánchez of La Razón highlighed how "its simplicity and honesty lead to a truth of the purest kind" as the best thing about the film.

== Accolades ==
Year	Award	Category	Nominee(s)	Result	Ref.
2026	25th Transilvania International Film Festival	Transilvania Trophy		Won	

== See also ==
- List of Spanish films of 2026
