= Pavle Čemerikić =

Serbian actor (1999)

Pavle Čemerikić (born 1999) is a Serbian actor. He is most noted for his performance as Faruk in the 2021 film The White Fortress (Tabija), for which he received a Canadian Screen Award nomination for Best Actor at the 10th Canadian Screen Awards in 2022 and a Vancouver Film Critics Circle nomination for Best Actor in a Canadian Film at the Vancouver Film Critics Circle Awards 2021.

His other credits have included the films No One's Child (Ničije dete), The Load (Teret), 78 Days (78 dana), and Last Night I Conquered the City of Thebes (Anoche conquisté Tebas).
