= Marta Hoyos =

Spanish actress and model

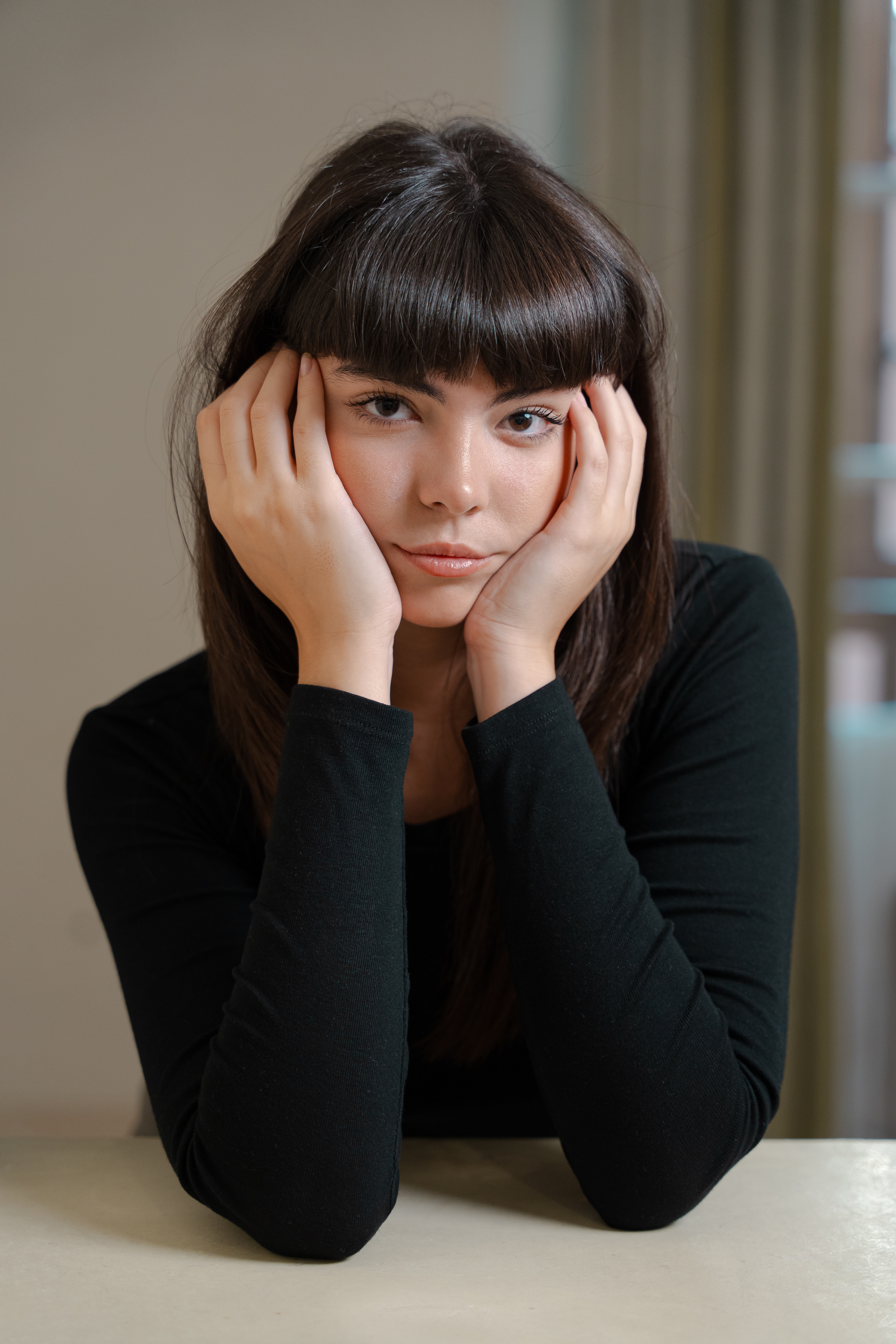
- Marta Hoyos in 2024
- Born: 2006 (age 19–20); Seville, Spain
- Occupation: Actress
- Years active: 2015–present

Marta Hoyos (born 2006) is a Spanish actress and model.

== Career ==
Marta Hoyos began performing when she was 10 years old by having a small role on the cult Spanish TV series El ministerio del tiempo. She is currently working on numerous film projects while studying for a degree in Translation and Interpretation in English at Pablo de Olavide University.

She is bilingual in English, has an advanced level in French, and possesses skills in singing on Blues and Jazz genres, dancing such as Flamenco, ballet or urban dance, as well as playing the piano, voice acting, and modeling. She has walked the runway at fashion events such as Fashion Week (Code41) and SIMOF, representing esteemed brands like Mª José Suárez Collections, Ángela y Adela, and Aurora Gaviño.

== Recognitions ==
- Award for academic and personal achievement; XXI edition, granted by the City Council of Seville.
- Honorary distinction in Social Sciences Baccalaureate, Institución Teresiana.
- Special mention in the "Best Leading Actress" category by the Andalusian Film Academy at the "Rodando por Jaén" festival.

== Filmography ==
=== Film ===
Year	Title	Role
2018	Superkids a la Caza del Tesoro	Layla
2020	Nato 0. El origen del mal	Kip

=== Television ===
Year	Title	Role	Notes
2016	El Ministerio del Tiempo	Isabel Naylor	TV Series; 1 episode
2017	Esperanza contra el mundo	Niña	TV Series; 1 episode
2019	La Tragedia de Biescas	Marta	TV Movie
2019	Pardo por la música	Hermana de Juan	TV Movie
2020	El Niño que Pintaba el Mar	Eva	TV Movie
2022	La Chica Invisible	Patri	TV Miniseries; 5 episodes

=== Short films ===
Year	Title	Role
2019	El álbum	Eva
2022	Lava	Ana
2023	Durmiente	Irene

== Theatre ==
- La caja de música
- A Midsummer Night's Dream by William Shakespeare
