= Leo & Lou =

- Theatrical release poster
- Directed by: Carlos Solano
- Screenplay by: Carlos Camba Tomé; Carlos Solano
- Story by: Carlos Camba Tomé
- Produced by: Antonio Asensio; Miriam Rodriguez; Paloma Molina; Luisa Romeo; Miranda Ballesteros; Rodrigo Ruiz-Tarazona
- Starring: Isak Férriz; Julia Sulleiro; Manuel Manquiña; Marta Larralde; María Pujalte; Maggie Civantos
- Cinematography: Borja López Díaz
- Edited by: Felipe Bravo
- Music by: Iván Palomares
- Production companies: Zeta Cinema; Zeta Audiovisual; Aurora Audiovisual AIE; Frida Films; Lunatica; Motion Picture Management
- Distributed by: Filmax
- Release dates: 26 October 2025 (Seminci); 7 November 2025 (Spain)
- Countries: Spain; United Kingdom; Romania
- Language: Spanish

Leo & Lou is a 2025 comedy film directed by Carlos Solano starring Isak Férriz and Julia Sulleiro.

It premiered at the 70th Valladolid International Film Festival on 26 October 2025 ahead of its Spanish theatrical release by Filmax on 7 November 2025.

== Plot ==
The plot follows Leo, an orphan mute girl fleeing a shelter in order to attend a fishing competition, and Lou, a down-and-outer man, as the latter picks Leo up hitchhiking thinking about returning her home, as they embark on a fun adventure instead.

== Cast ==
- Isak Férriz as Lou
- Julia Sulleiro as Leo
- Manuel Manquiña
- Marta Larralde as María
- María Pujalte
- Maggie Civantos as Mar

== Production ==
A Spanish-British-Romanian venture, the film was produced by Zeta Cinema, Zeta Audiovisual, Aurora Audiovisual AIE, and Frida Films alongside Lunatica and Motion Picture Management, with the association of LipSync and Richmond Pictures, and the participation of RTVE, CRTVG, and Netflix. It was shot in Galicia.

== Release ==
Leo & Lou had its world premiere in a RTVE gala held at the Teatro Zorrilla as a part of the 70th Valladolid International Film Festival (Seminci) on 26 October 2025. For its international premiere, it was also selected for the 'Just Film International Competition Programme' nestled in the 29th Tallinn Black Nights Film Festival, and in the slates of the Mar del Plata International Film Festival and the Almería International Film Festival (FICAL).

Distributed by Filmax, it was released theatrically in Spain on 7 November 2025.

== Reception ==
Paula Hernández Platero of Cinemanía rated the film 3½ out of 5 stars, assessing that it is "impossible not to grow fond of the two main characters" who "will leave you feeling warm inside when you leave the theater".

== Accolades ==
| Year | Award | Category | Nominee(s) | Result | Ref. |
|---|---|---|---|---|---|
| 2025 | 29th Tallinn Black Nights Film Festival | Just Film — Best Film Award (Children's Competition) | | Won | |
| 2026 | 81st CEC Medals | Best New Director | Carlos Solano | Nominated | |
| 2026 | 40th Goya Awards | Best Original Score | Iván Palomares | Nominated | |

== See also ==
- List of Spanish films of 2025
