= Stolen Away =

Spanish television series

- Spanish: Perdida
- Genre: Thriller; Drama
- Created by: Natxo López
- Based on: an original story by David Oliva and Ruth García
- Directed by: Iñaki Peñafiel; David Ulloa; Rafa Montesinos
- Starring: Daniel Grao; Carolina Lapausa; Melani Olivares; Flaco Solórzano; Juan Messier; Jon Arias; Verónica Veslásquez; David Trejos; Ana María Orozco; Adriana Paz
- Country of origin: Spain
- Original language: Spanish
- No. of seasons: 1
- No. of episodes: 11

Production
- Running time: 50 minutes
- Production companies: Atresmedia; Big Bang Media

Original release
- Network: Atresplayer Premium
- Release: 14 January – 24 March 2020

Stolen Away (Spanish: Perdida) is a Spanish thriller drama television series, produced by Atresmedia with the collaboration of Big Bang Media for broadcasting in Antena 3. Created by Natxo López, the series stars Daniel Grao, Carolina Lapausa, Melanie Olivares, Ana María Orozco, and Adriana Paz, among others. It follows Antonio (Grao), who travels to Bogotá to search for the man who years before kidnapped his daughter in Valencia. The series was pre-launched on streaming platform Atresplayer Premium on January 10, 2020. The series premiered on Antena 3 on January 14, 2020.

The series was also launched by Netflix in Spain, Portugal, and Latin America on June 5, 2020, and worldwide on October 23, 2020.

== Cast ==
- Daniel Grao as Antonio Santos Trénor
- Carolina Lapausa as Inma Rodríguez Colomer
- Melani Olivares as Eva Aguirre
- Fernando [El Flaco] Solórzano as Norberto Quitombo
- Juan Messier as Cruz Alfonso Ochoa
- Jon Arias as Sebastián Holguera
- Verónica Velásquez as Soledad Santos Rodríguez
- David Trejos as Ignacio
- Ana María Orozco as Milena Jiménez Mendoza
- Adriana Paz as Angelita Moreno Guerrero
- Steicy Gil as Daisy
- Jose Sospedra as Gerardo
- Camila Moreno as Camila Moreno
- Mario Bolaños as Wilson

== Episodes ==
No.	Title	Directed by	Written by	Original release date	Viewers (millions)
1	"El Español"	Iñaki Peñafiel	Story by : Natxo López and Mikel Barón; Screenplay : Natxo López	January 14, 2020	1,742,000 (11.5%)
2	"Un hombre previsor"	Iñaki Peñafiel	Natxo López	January 21, 2020	1,287,000 (8.6%)
3	"Teo"	David Ulloa	Screenplay : Natxo López; Dialogue : Carlos de Pando	January 28, 2020	1,137,000 (7.7%)
4	"Reencuentros"	David Ulloa	Natxo López and Carlos de Pando	February 4, 2020	1,154,000 (7.8%)
5	"El traidor"	Rafa Montesinos	Natxo López	February 11, 2020	1,055,000 (7.2%)
6	"Los detalles son importantes"	Rafa Montesinos	Natxo López	February 18, 2020	1,038,000 (7.4%)
7	"La fuga"	Iñaki Peñafiel	Story by : Natxo López and Mikel Barón; Screenplay : Natxo López	February 25, 2020	1,003,000 (7.1%)
8	"Hombre muerto"	Iñaki Peñafiel	Natxo López, Almudena Ocaña and Aurora Gracià	March 3, 2020	957,000 (6.7%)
9	"Ibagué"	David Ulloa	Natxo López and Mikel Barón	March 10, 2020	981,000 (6.8%)
10	"Cambalaches"	Rafa Montesinos	Natxo López, Almudena Ocaña and Aurora Gracià	March 17, 2020	973,000 (5.9%)
11	"Padre"	Iñaki Peñafiel	Natxo López	March 24, 2020	1,053,000 (6.5%)
