= Horodiște, Rezina =

Horodiște
- Commune
- Location within Moldova
- Coordinates: 47.6127777778°N 28.945°E
- Country: Moldova
- District: Rezina District

Population (2014)
  - Total: 1,545
- Time zone: UTC+2 (EET)
  - Summer (DST): UTC+3 (EEST)

Horodiște is a commune in Rezina District, Moldova. It is composed of two villages, Horodiște and Slobozia-Horodiște.

== Notable people ==
- Pavel Anton (1936–2026), composer
