= Last Night I Conquered the City of Thebes =

- Theatrical release poster
- Spanish: Anoche conquisté Tebas
- Directed by: Gabriel Azorín
- Written by: Gabriel Azorín; Celso Giménez
- Produced by: Carlos Pardo Ros
- Starring: Santiago Mateus; António Martim Gouveia; Oussama Asfaraah; Pavle Čemerikić
- Cinematography: Giuseppe Trupi
- Edited by: Ariadna Ribas
- Production companies: DVEIN Films; Filmika Galaika; Bando à Parte
- Distributed by: Begin Again Films (Spain)
- Release dates: 27 August 2025 (Venice); 28 August 2026 (Spain)
- Running time: 112 minutes
- Countries: Spain; Portugal
- Languages: Portuguese; Latin; Galician; Spanish

Last Night I Conquered the City of Thebes (Spanish: Anoche conquisté Tebas) is a 2025 drama film, written and directed by Gabriel Azorín. Starring Santiago Mateus, Antonio Martim Gouveia, Oussama Asfaraah and Pavle Čemerikić.

The film had its world premiere at the Giornate degli Autori section of the 82nd Venice International Film Festival on 27 August 2025, where it was nominated for the Queer Lion.

== Premise ==
An examination of emotional intimacy between men, the film is set in two distinct time periods at the Roman baths of Bande, Ourense, contrasting the story of António (Santiago Mateus) and Jota (António Martim Gouveia), two young men exploring the remains of the baths in the present day, with that of Aurelius (Oussama Asfaraah) and Pompey (Pavle Čemerikić), two ancient soldiers at the bath site during Roman times.

== Cast ==
- Santiago Mateus as António
- António Martim Gouveia as Jota
- Oussama Asfaraah as Aurelius
- Pavle Čemerikić as Pompey

== Release ==
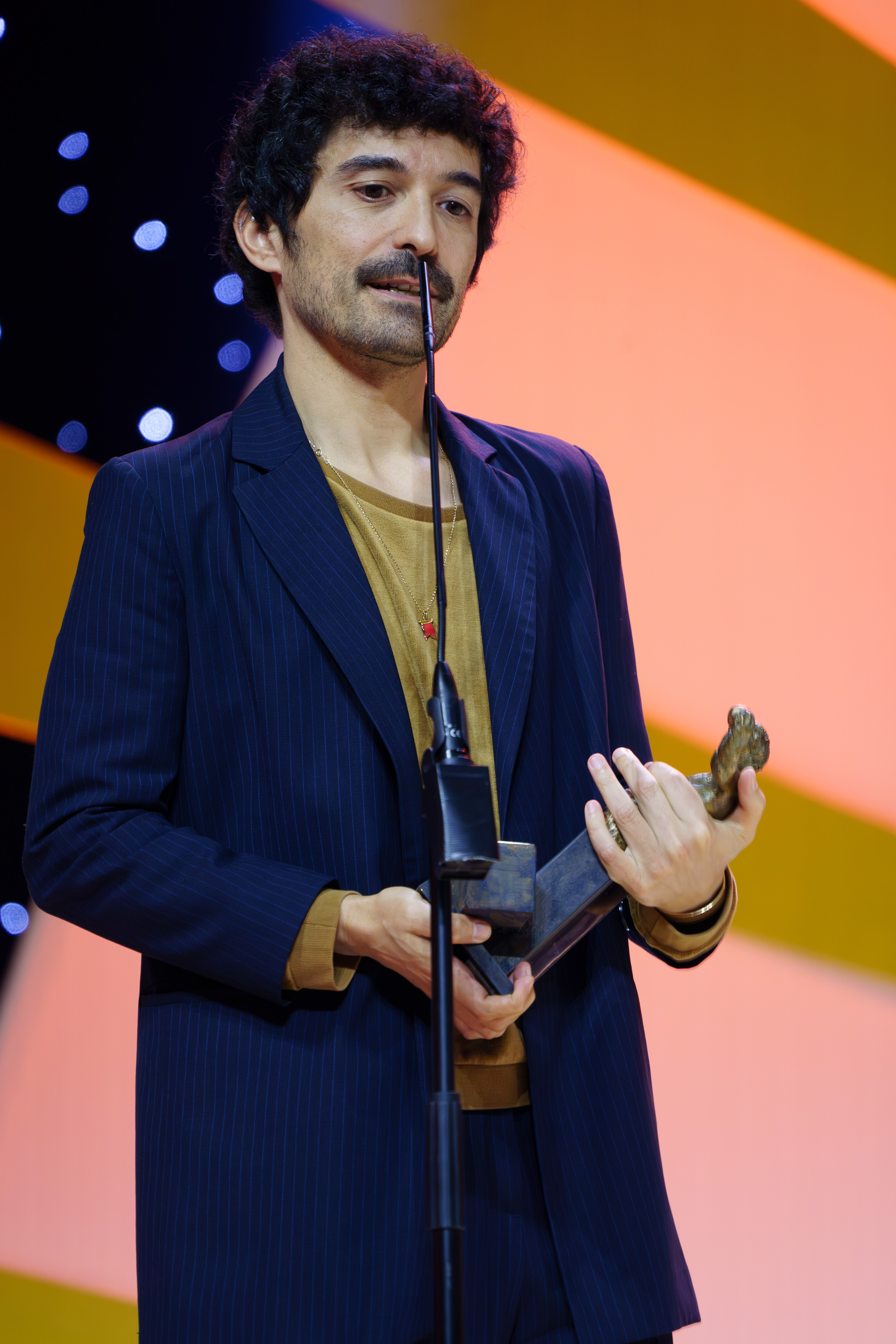
Azorín receiving the Fundos Special Award at the 2025 Seminci

The film premiered in the Giornate degli Autori program at the 82nd Venice International Film Festival, where it was also in competition for the Queer Lion. It also entered the 'Meeting Point' section of the 70th Valladolid International Film Festival (Seminci), winning the Fundos Special Award.

In November 2025, the film won the Grand Prize at the Belfort Entrevues International Film Festival.

Begin Again Films secured Spanish distribution rights, with a theatrical release set for 28 August 2026.

== Release ==
Marta Medina del Valle of El Confidencial rated the film 5 out of 5 stars, declaring it "a film that mesmerizes, stimulates, and, at times, frustrates. But it frustrates in the best possible way".
