= I Only Rest in the Storm =

2025 drama film by Pedro Pinho

- Portuguese promotional poster
- Portuguese: O Riso e a Faca
- Directed by: Pedro Pinho
- Written by: Miguel Carmo; Paul Choquet; Luís Miguel Correia; José Filipe Costa; Tiago Hespanha; Luisa Homem; Marta Lança; Leonor Noivo; Pedro Pinho; Miguel Seabra Lopes
- Produced by: Tiago Hespanha; Ioana Lascar; Juliette Lepoutre; Pierre Menahem; Pedro Pinho; Filipa Reis; Radu Stancu
- Starring: Sérgio Coragem; Cleo Diára; Jonathan Guilherme
- Cinematography: Ivo Lopes Araújo
- Edited by: Karen Akerman; Cláudia Rita Oliveira; Rita M. Pestana
- Music by: Carpotxa; Mazulu
- Production companies: Uma Pedra no Sapato; Terratreme Filmes
- Distributed by: Uma Pedra no Sapato (Portugal); Vitrine Filmes (Brazil); Météore Films (France)
- Release dates: 17 May 2025 (Cannes); 30 October 2025 (Portugal)
- Running time: 217 minutes
- Countries: Portugal; Brazil; France; Romania
- Languages: Portuguese; Spanish; French; Guinea-Bissau Creole; English
- Box office: $14,664

I Only Rest in the Storm (Portuguese: O Riso e a Faca, lit. "The Laugh and the Knife") is a 2025 drama film produced, co-written and directed by Pedro Pinho. Starring Sérgio Coragem, Cleo Diára and Jonathan Guilherme, it follows a white Portuguese environmental engineer who takes a job position in Guinea-Bissau, and his complicated relationship with two black locals.

The film had its world premiere in the Un Certain Regard section of the 78th Cannes Film Festival on 17 May 2025, where it was nominated for the Queer Palm and Diára won the section's Best Actress prize. It was theatrically released in Portugal on 30 October by Uma Pedra no Sapato.

== Premise ==
Portuguese environmental engineer Sérgio travels to Guinea-Bissau to work in a NGO construction of a road between a desert and a forest. His next door neighbor, Diára, is a free minded young woman and close friend of Gui, a gay Brazilian man who is part of the marginalized queer community of Bissau. Sérgio becomes involved in an intimate unbalanced relationship with both of them, as he delves deeper into the neocolonialist dynamics of the expatriate community in the "third world".

== Cast ==
- Sérgio Coragem as Sérgio
- Cleo Diára as Diára
- Jonathan Guilherme as Gui
- Jorge Biague
- João Santos Lopes
- Hermínio Amaro
- Nástio Mosquito
- Giovanni Maucieri
- Marçalina Djibril
- Roxana Lonesco
- Guilton Vitória
- Olga Djeba
- Eneida Marta
- Bebe Melkor-Kadior
- Marinho de Pina

== Production ==
In October 2018, the project received a €141,000 production grant from the Romanian National Film Center. In November 2020, it was selected to participate in the European Coproductions meeting, initiated by Seville European Film Festival.

== Release ==
I Only Rest in the Storm had its world premiere at the Un Certain Regard section of the 2025 Cannes Film Festival on 17 May 2025. Prior to its premiere, Paradise City Sales acquired the film's international sales.

It was theatrically released in France on 9 July by Météore Films, and in Portugal on 30 October by Uma Pedra no Sapato.

== Reception ==
On the review aggregator website Rotten Tomatoes, 78% of 18 critics' reviews are positive. Miriam Balanescu of IndieWire gave the film a grade of A− and pointed out its different distinction of non-governmental organization in films.

=== Accolades ===
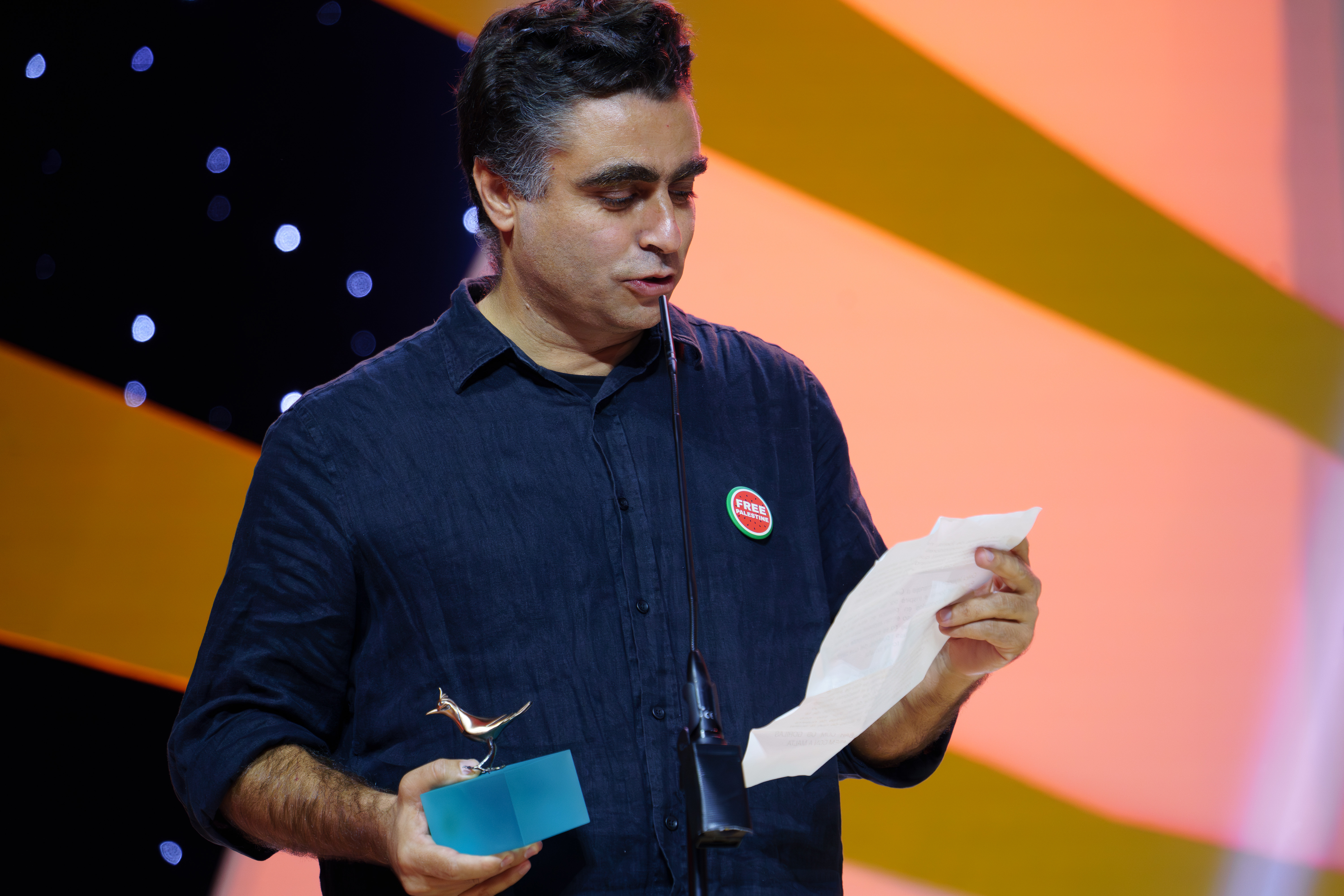
Pinho holding the Meeting Point award obtained by the film at the 70th Valladolid International Film Festival.

Award / Festival	Date of ceremony	Category	Recipient(s)	Result	Ref.
Cannes Film Festival	23 May 2025	Un Certain Regard Award	Pedro Pinho	Nominated	
Cannes Film Festival	23 May 2025	Un Certain Regard for Best Actress	Cleo Diára	Won	
Cannes Film Festival	23 May 2025	Queer Palm	Pedro Pinho	Nominated	
Valladolid International Film Festival	1 November 2025	Meeting Point Award	I Only Rest in the Storm	Won	
