= Gabriel Azorín =

Spanish film director

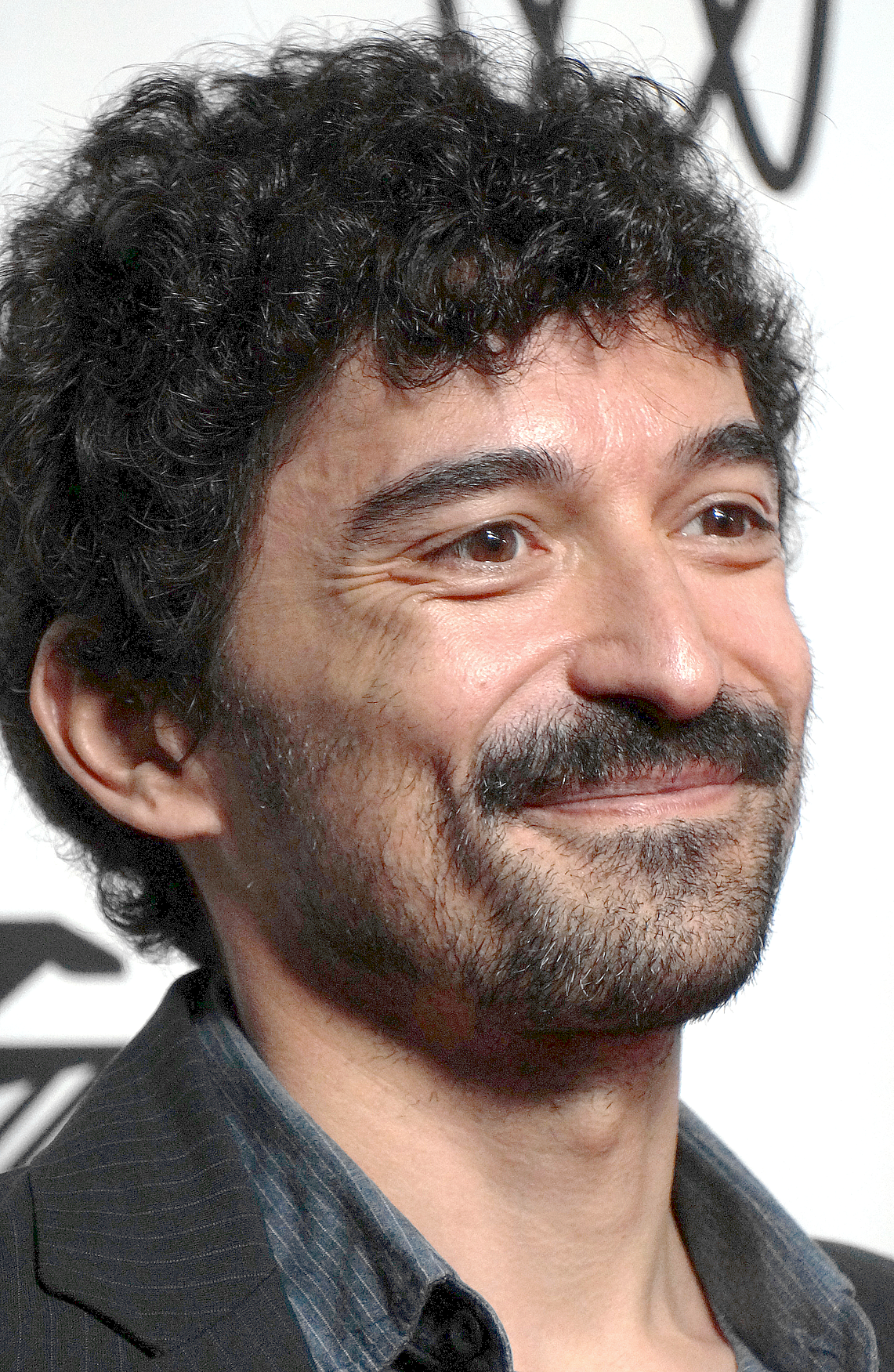
- Born: 1981 (age 44–45); Hellín, Albacete, Castilla–La Mancha, Spain
- Occupations: film director, screenwriter
- Years active: 2000s-present
- Notable work: Last Night I Conquered the City of Thebes

Gabriel Azorín (born 1981) is a Spanish film director and screenwriter, most noted for his 2025 film Last Night I Conquered the City of Thebes (Anoche conquisté Tebas).

A cofounder of the lacasinegra filmmaking collective with Elena López Riera, he directed a number of short films before releasing his debut documentary film, The Mutants (Los mutantes), in 2016.

Last Night I Conquered the City of Thebes, his first narrative feature film, premiered in the Giornate degli Autori section of the 82nd Venice International Film Festival. Later screenings included the 'Meeting Point' section of the 70th Valladolid International Film Festival (Seminci), where it won the Fundos Special Award, and the Belfort Entrevues International Film Festival, where it won the Grand Prix.

== Filmography ==
- Greyhounds (Los galgos) - 2011
- El buen amor - 2014
- Pas à Genève - 2014, codirector with Elena López Riera
- Tomorrow, the Bullet (Mañana vendrá la bala) - 2015
- The Mutants (Los mutantes) - 2016
- The Noise of the Universe (El ruido del universo) - 2022
- Last Night I Conquered the City of Thebes (Anoche conquisté Tebas) - 2025
