= Acusados =

Spanish comedy thriller television series

- Genre: Legal drama Psychological thriller
- Starring: Blanca Portillo; José Coronado; Daniel Grao; Silvia Abascal; Mónica López; Alejo Sauras
- Country of origin: Spain
- Original language: Spanish
- No. of seasons: 2
- No. of episodes: 26

Production
- Production company: Ida y Vuelta

Original release
- Network: Telecinco
- Release: 28 January 2009 – 22 April 2010

Acusados is a Spanish drama television series created by Ida y Vuelta starring Blanca Portillo and José Coronado, among others. It aired from 2009 to 2010 on Telecinco.

== Premise ==
Rosa Ballester (Blanca Portillo) is a judge who prosecutes the businessman Joaquín de la Torre (José Coronado) for believing him responsible for a fire in a club. To that end, Ballester requires the services of Jorge Vega (Daniel Grao), who moves from Salamanca to Madrid in order to help with the investigation, unbeknownst the main reason behind the requirement of Ballester is that the latter wants to approach Vega's girlfriend Laura Nieto (Silvia Abascal), supposedly a key piece in the case.

== Cast ==
- Blanca Portillo as Rosa Ballester.
- José Coronado as Joaquín de la Torre.
- Daniel Grao as Jorge Vega.
- Silvia Abascal as Laura Nieto.
- Anna Allen as Sonia Nieto.
- Alberto Amarilla as Álex de la Torre.
- Goya Toledo as Beatriz Montero.
- Helio Pedregal as Héctor Doménech.
- Isabel Serrano as Isabel Holgado.
- Aitor Mazo as Ricardo Díaz.
- Daniel Albaladejo as Diego Luque.
- Santiago Meléndez as Raúl Moreno.
- Joseba Apaolaza as Julio Almagro.
- Esperanza Elipe as Carmen.
- Natalia Sánchez as Marina Doménech Ballester.
- Carla Nieto as Patricia Doménech Ballester.
- Pep Munné as Federico Portela.
- Mariana Cordero as Celia García.
- Alberto Jiménez as Fernando Aguirre.
- Duna Santos as Marisol.
- Pere Ventura as Bruno Losada.
- Francisco Nortes as Rafa.
- Vicente Cuesta as Antonio Galán.

Introduced in season 2

- Alejo Sauras as Pablo Alonso.
- Tamar Novas as Jaime Álvarez.
- Mónica López as Aurora Castillo.
- José Luis Torrijo as Rubio.
- José Luis García Pérez as Rafael Espinosa.
- Sonia Almarcha as Teresa Llorente.
- Joan Crosas as Judge Castillo.
- Carmen Sánchez as Alba.

== Production and release ==
Filming started by September 2008 in Salamanca, later moving to Madrid. The series premiered on 28 January 2009. The last episode of the first season aired on 22 April 2009. The second season premiered on 13 January 2010. The broadcasting run of the 26-episode series ended on 22 April 2010, with average figures of 2,128,000 viewers and a 13.4% audience share.

Acusados was reportedly so eerily similar to the American series Damages that Sony Pictures considered to file a plagiarism reclamation.

Series	Episodes	Originally released		
Series	Episodes	First released	Last released	Network
1	13	28 January 2009	22 April 2009	Telecinco
2	13	13 January 2010	13 January 2010	Telecinco
