= El ángel de Budapest =

- starring Francis Lorenzo (left) and Manuel de Blas (right)
- Genre: War, Drama, Romance
- Based on: Un español frente al Holocausto by Diego Carcedo
- Written by: Ángel Aranda; Diego Carcedo
- Directed by: Luis Oliveros
- Countries of origin: Spain; Hungary
- Original language: Spanish

Production
- Executive producers: Eduardo Campoy; José Manuel Lorenzo
- Cinematography: Nyika Jancsó
- Running time: 120 minutes
- Production companies: Filmteam, Boomerang TV; Televisión Española
- Budget: 2 million €

Original release
- Network: La 1
- Release: 22 December 2011

El ángel de Budapest (Angel of Budapest) is a Spanish 2011 World War II-Holocaust television film based on the book Un español frente al Holocausto ("A Spaniard against the Holocaust") written by journalist and radio executive director Diego Carcedo. The executive producers are José Manuel Lorenzo, Eduardo Campoy and István Major, the first two had collaborated on the spiritual film Sin noticias de Dios (2001). The film was shot between 9 November 2010 and 23 December 2010 in Budapest, Hungary.

== Plot ==
The plot focuses on Ángel Sanz Briz, a Spanish ambassador in Hungary during World War II. Operating until early 1944 in Budapest, he helped to save the lives of thousands of Jews from the Holocaust. He issued them protective papers and lodged them in Spanish safe houses, covered by the embassy's sovereignty. At that time, the Hungarian government was persecuting and deporting Jews to Nazi Germany death camps.

A romantic storyline follows the lovelife of Antal, a Hungarian Jew who falls in love with the daughter of an Arrow Cross official of the Fascist government. Antal slowly turns to the resistance movement to save the couple.

== Cast ==
- Anna Allen as Adela Quijano
- Tamás Lengyel as Lajos
- George Mendel as Danielson
- Manuel de Blas as Miguel Ángel Muguiro
- Ana Fernández as Sra. Tourné
- Francis Lorenzo as Ángel Sanz Briz
- Aldo Sebastianelli as Giorgio Perlasca
- Tamás Szabó Kimmel as Antal
- Iván Fenyő as Raoul Wallenberg
- Áron Őze as Adolf Eichmann
- László Agárdi as Miklós Horthy
- Kata Gáspár
- Sára Herrer
- Athina Papadimitriu
- Tamás Balikó
- János Bán
- László Baranyi
- László Áron

== Nominations ==
- Nominated - Magnolia Award for Best Television Film or Miniseries, 18th Shanghai Television Festival (2012)
