= Forastera (film) =

- Promotional poster
- Directed by: Lucía Aleñar Iglesias
- Written by: Lucía Aleñar Iglesias
- Starring: Zoe Stein; Lluís Homar; Martina García; Marta Angelat; Núria Prims; Nonni Ardal
- Cinematography: Agnès Piqué
- Edited by: Paola Freddi
- Music by: Anna von Hausswolff; Filip Leyman
- Production companies: Lastor Media; Vilaüt Films; La Perifèrica Produccions; Presenta Films; Kino Produzioni; Fox in the Snow Films; Basterna Films
- Distributed by: Atalante (Spain); Alpha Violet (International)
- Release dates: 8 September 2025 (TIFF); 11 September 2026 (Spain)
- Countries: Spain; Sweden; Italy
- Languages: Catalan; English; Spanish

Forastera is a 2025 drama film written and directed by Lucía Aleñar expanding on Aleñar's eponymous short film. It stars Zoe Stein and Lluís Homar. It is shot in Catalan.

== Plot ==
As sisters Cata and Eva are having a vacation with their grandparents in Mallorca, they are hit by the death of grandmother Catalina. Upon trying on one of Catalina's old dresses, Cata steps into her grandmother's vacant role, causing family resentments and subsequent healing to come to surface.

== Cast ==
- Zoe Stein as Cata
- Martina García as Eva
- Marta Angelat as Catalina
- Lluís Homar as Tomeu
- Núria Prims as Pepa
- Nonni Ardal

== Production ==
The film is a Spanish-Swedish-Italian co-production by Lastor Media, Vilaüt Films, Presenta Films, La Perifèrica Produccions, Kino Produzioni and Fox in the Snow, with the participation of 3Cat, RTVE, IB3, Filmin and the backing from ICAA, ICEC, Creative Europe MEDIA, Direzione generale Cinema e audiovisivo, the Swedish Film Institute, Fundació Mallorca Turisme, Mallorca Film Commission, Artekino, and Göteborgs Stad. It was shot in Catalan in locations of the island of Mallorca, including Alcúdia and Pollença.

== Release ==
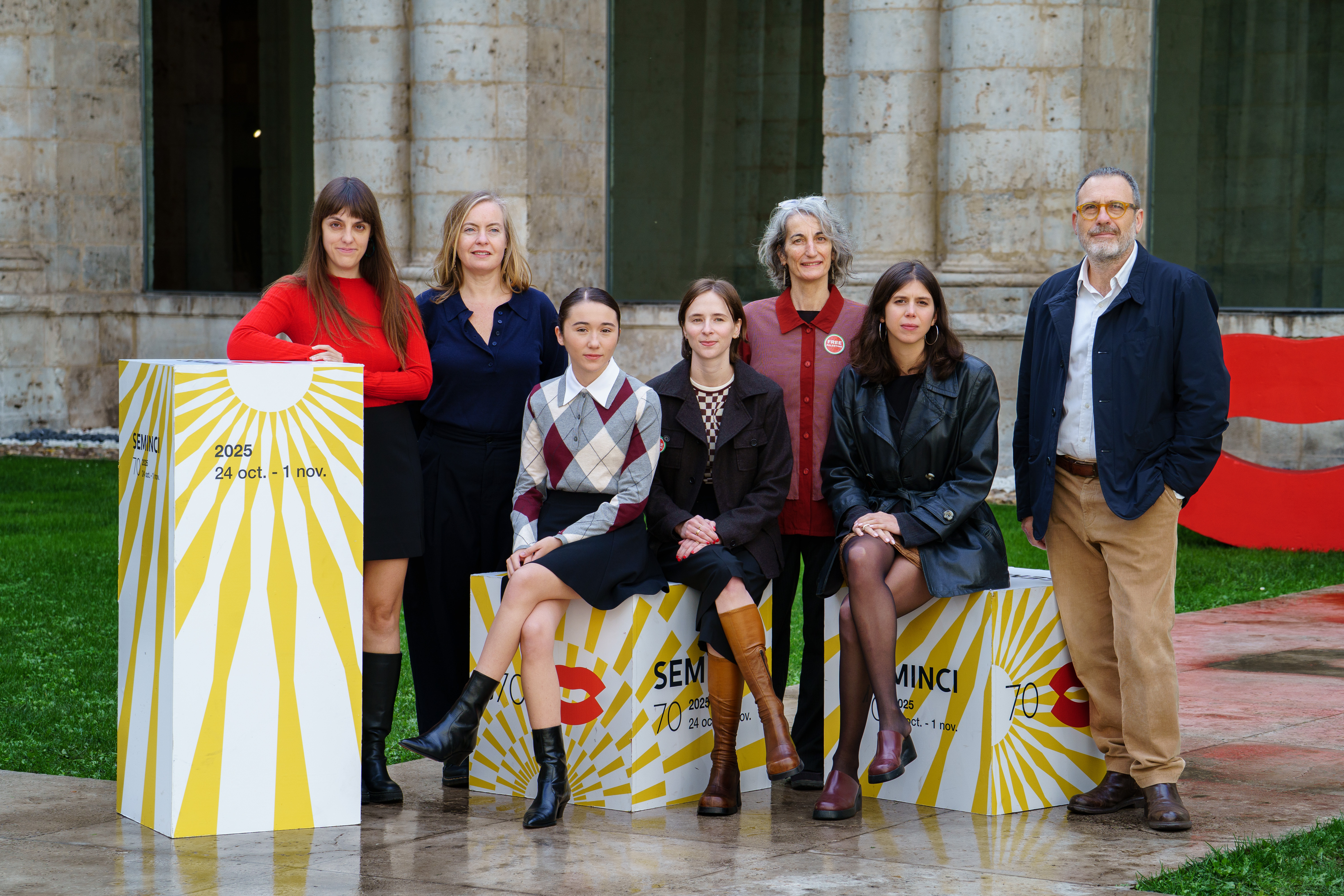
Cast and crew members during the presentation at the Seminci in October 2025

The film premiered in the Discovery section of the 50th Toronto International Film Festival on 8 September 2025. Alpha Violet handled international sales. Filmin secured rights to a streaming window. For its Spanish premiere, the film made it to the 'Meeting Point' slate of the 70th Valladolid International Film Festival (Seminci). Its festival run also included selections for screenings at the Tallinn Black Nights Film Festival and the 2025 Stockholm International Film Festival.

Distribution deals were closed for the markets of Spain (Atalante), Sweden (Folkets Bio), Japan (Starcat), and the United States (Grasshopper Film).

The film is scheduled to be released theatrically in Spain on 11 September 2026.

== Reception ==
Carlos Aguilar of RogerEbert.com gave the film a 4-star rating, declaring it "a major discovery, handling grief with alluring stylistic choices that enhance the already remarkable narrative".

Natalia Winkelman of The New York Times hailed Forastera as "an exquisitely deconstructed ghost story, a muted mystery that beguiles while remaining deeply grounded in its evocative setting".

Javier Ocaña of El País considered the film not to be an easy movie as anyone would admit, adding that to him it is not a good movie either, otherwise pointing out that it takes a long time to start up.

In a 3-star rating, Manuel J. Lombardo of Diario de Sevilla deemed the film to be "an stimulating debut" drawing from obvious cinematic influences such as Céline Sciamma's works.

On review aggregator website Rotten Tomatoes, the film holds an approval rating of 91% based on 35 reviews, with an average rating of 8.0/10.

== Accolades ==
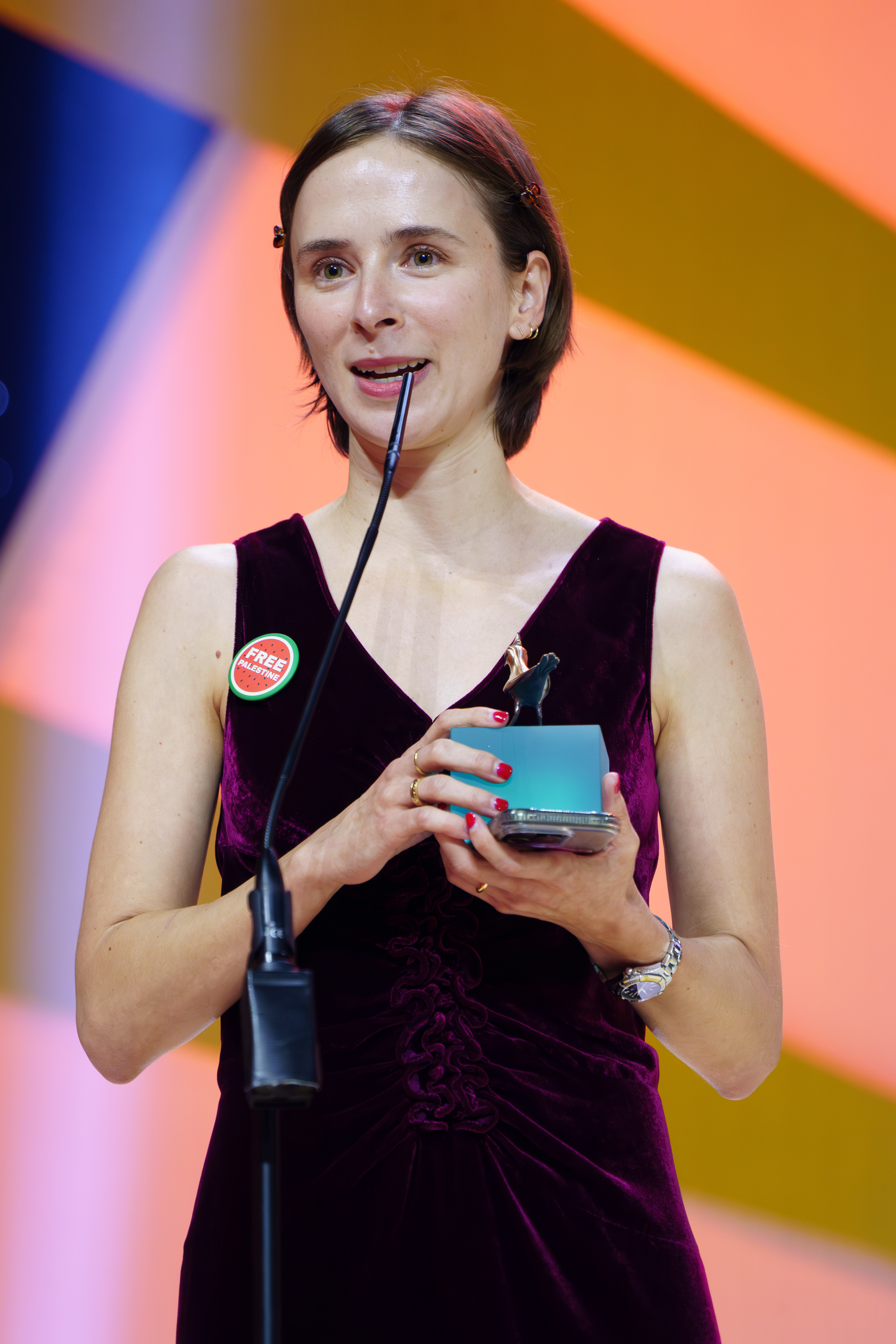
Aleñar holding her Pilar Miró prize obtained at the 2025 Seminci

Year	Award	Category	Nominee(s)	Result	Ref.
2025	2025 Toronto International Film Festival	FIPRESCI Prize		Won	
2025	70th Valladolid International Film Festival	'Pilar Miró' Prize for Best Spanish Director	Lucía Aleñar	Won	

== See also ==
- List of Spanish films of 2026
