= Three Goodbyes =

Upcoming film by Isabel Coixet

- Italian theatrical release poster
- Italian: Tre ciotole
- Directed by: Isabel Coixet
- Written by: Enrico Audenino; Isabel Coixet
- Based on: Tre ciotole by Michela Murgia
- Starring: Alba Rohrwacher; Elio Germano; Silvia D'Amico; Galatea Bellugi; Francesco Carril; Sarita Choudhury
- Cinematography: Guido Michelotti
- Edited by: Jordi Azategui
- Music by: Alfonso de Vilallonga
- Production companies: Cattleya; Ruvido Produzioni; Bartlebyfilm; Buenapinta Media; Bteam Prods; Colosé Producciones; Perdición Films; Vision Distribution
- Distributed by: Vision Distribution (Italy); BTeam Pictures (Spain)
- Release dates: 8 September 2025 (TIFF); 9 October 2025 (Italy); 6 February 2026 (Spain)
- Running time: 120 minutes
- Countries: Italy; Spain
- Language: Italian

Three Goodbyes (Italian: Tre ciotole) is a 2025 drama film directed by Isabel Coixet and co-written by Enrico Audenino based on the book by Michela Murgia. It stars Alba Rohrwacher and Elio Germano. It is an Italian-Spanish co-production.

== Plot ==
The plot follows a couple (Marta and Antonio) after they split up.

== Cast ==
- Alba Rohrwacher as Marta
- Elio Germano as Antonio
- Francesco Carril as Agostino
- Silvia D'Amico as Marta's sister
- Galatea Bellugi as Antonio's colleague
- Sarita Choudhury as Gastroenterologist
- Vera Gemma as herself

== Production ==
The screenplay was written by Enrico Audenino with the collaboration of Isabel Coixet. The film is an Italian-Spanish co-production by Cattleya (ITV Studios), Ruvido Produzioni, Bartlebyfilm, Buenapinta Media, Bteam Prods, Colosé Producciones, and Perdición Films with the participation of Max and Sky. Shooting locations included Rome.

== Release ==
The film was set to have its world premiere at the 2025 Toronto International Film Festival on 8 September 2025. It was selected as the opening film of the 70th Valladolid International Film Festival.

Vision Distribution handled distribution in Italy and BTeam Pictures did so in Spain.

== Reception ==
Jessica Kiang from Variety described the film as "a charmingly bittersweet and life-affirming movie". Nadia Dalimonte from Next Best Picture wrote that Three Goodbyes "incorporates these personal monologues with broader meditations on various themes, including intimacy and illness" and also shines as "a sweet, personalized love letter to Rome".

== Accolades ==
Year	Award	Category	Nominee(s)	Result	Ref.
2026	71st David di Donatello	Best Supporting Actress	Silvia D'Amico	Pending	
2026	32nd Forqué Awards	Best Film		Pending	

== See also ==
- List of Italian films of 2025
- List of Spanish films of 2026
