= 25th Iris Awards (Spain) =

Television awards

- Date: 16 January 2024
- Site: Gran Teatro Caixabank Príncipe Pío, Madrid, Spain
- Organized by: Academy of Television and Audiovisual Arts and Sciences

The 25th Iris Awards ceremony, presented by the Academy of Television and Audiovisual Arts and Sciences, took place at the Gran Teatro Caixabank Príncipe Pío in Madrid on 16 January 2024.

== Background ==
The ceremony was originally scheduled for 21 November 2023, coinciding with the World Television Day. The Academy of Television and Audiovisual Arts and Sciences disclosed the nominations on 10 July 2023.

== Nominations ==
The winners and nominees are listed as follows:

| Best Actor: Fele Martínez — Alpha Males (Netflix); Daniel Grao — The Invisible Girl (Disney+); David Verdaguer — Citas Barcelona (Prime Video / TV3); Mehdi Regragui — La Unidad Kabul (Movistar Plus+); Patrick Criado — Nights in Tefía (AtresPlayer); Ricardo Gómez — The Route (AtresPlayer) | Best Actress: Belén Cuesta — Untameable (AtresPlayer); Anna Castillo — Simple (Movistar Plus+); Blanca Portillo — When You Least Expect It (Prime Video); Lolita Flores — Las invisibles (Skyshowtime); Marta Hazas — When You Least Expect It (Prime Video); Zoe Stein — The Invisible Girl (Disney+) |
| Best Production (Fiction): Juanma Pagazaurtundua — La Unidad Kabul (Movistar Plus+); Antonio Asensio, Paloma Molina — No Traces (Prime Video); Jaume Banacolocha, Laura Abril — The Gypsy Bride (AtresPlayer); Manolo Caro, María José Córdoba, Rafael Ley — Holy Family (Netflix); Montse García, Sonia Martínez — Nights in Tefía (AtresPlayer); Reyes Baltanás, Mar Díaz, José Manuel Lorenzo — La caza. Guadiana (La 1) | Best Production (Entertainment): Production team of La Voz (Antena 3); Ángeles Villamarín — La isla de las tentaciones (Telecinco); Corinna Sarsanedas & team — Traitors España (HBO Max); Production team of Acoustic Home 2 (HBO Max / RTVC); Jorge Salvador, Jorge Ventosa — El desafío (Antena 3); T. Pietro, C. Marín, J. Cuadrado, L. Lara — Dúos increíbles (La 1) |
Best Screenplay (Fiction): Alberto Marini, Amèlia Mora, Juan Galiñanes, Dani de la Torre — La Unidad Kabul (Movistar Plus+); Ana Rujas, Claudia Costafreda — Cardo (AtresPlayer); Carlos de Pando, Sara Antuña, Héctor Beltrán — No Traces (Prime Video); Daniel Sánchez Arévalo — The Girls at the Back (Netflix); Jesús Mesas, Javier Andrés — The Snow Girl (Netflix); Miguel del Arco, Antonio Rojano — Nights in Tefía (AtresPlayer)
Best Screenplay (Entertainment): Diego Fabiano, Javi Valera, Miguel Campos, Daniel Álvarez, Helena Pozuelo, Pilar De Francisco, Luis Fabra, Kaco Forns, Yunez Chaib, Luis Fabra, Xavi Daura, Manuel Álvarez — La resistencia (Movistar Plus+); Álex Navarro, Carlos Torres — Traitors España (HBO Max); Writing team — Aruser@s (laSexta); José Mota — Sálvese quien Putín. Nochevieja 2022 (La 1); Meritxell Aranda, David Brunat, Airg Maragall, Silvia Merino Esteban Ordóñez, Majo Císcar — Lo de Évole (laSexta); Miki Blanco, Pilar Ávila — Imprescindibles. Nino Bravo (La 1)
| Best Fiction: La Unidad Kabul (Movistar Plus+); Citas Barcelona (Prime Video); The Invisible Girl (Disney +); Nights in Tefía (AtresPlayer); Alpha Males (Netflix); Rapa (Movistar Plus+) | Best Cinematography (Fiction): Josu Inchaustegui — La Unidad Kabul (Movistar Plus+); Andreu Adam — The Gypsy Bride (AtresPlayer); Diego Cabezas The Route (AtresPlayer); Isaac Vila, Álex García, Unax Mendía — No Traces (Prime Video); Juana Jiménez — The Girls at the Back (Netflix); Néstor Calvo — The Invisible Girl (Disney+) |
| Best Direction (TV Shows): Carmen Aguilera — El Intermedio (laSexta); Javier Ruiz — Joaquín, el novato (Antena 3); Jorge Salvador — El desafío (Antena 3); Meritxell Estruch — La isla de las tentaciones (Telecinco); Nía Sanjuán — Traitors España (HBO Max); Patricia Fernández, Vicente Florindo — Masterchef 11 (La 1) | Best Presenter (News): Almudena Ariza — Españoles en conflicto (La 1); Ana Pastor — El Objetivo: especial 8M, mujeres en Irán (laSexta); Ana Rosa Quintana — El programa de Ana Rosa (Telecinco); Joaquín Prat — Ya es mediodía (Telecinco); Sandra Golpe — Antena 3 Noticias 1 (Antena 3); Vicente Vallés — Antena 3 Noticias 2 (Antena 3) |
| Best Presenter (Entertainment): Roberto Leal — El desafío (Antena 3); Alfonso Arús — Aruser@s (laSexta); Andreu Buenafuente — Nadie sabe nada (HBO Max); Jacob Petrus — Aquí la Tierra (La 1); Mercedes Milá — Milá vs Milá (Movistar Plus+); Sandra Sabatés — El Intermedio (laSexta) | Best Show (Entertainment): La resistencia (Movistar Plus+); El Hormiguero (Antena 3); I Am Georgina (Netflix); La isla de las tentaciones (Telecinco); Masterchef 11 (La 1); Traitors España (HBO Max) |
| Best Show (Dissemination): Un país para leerlo (La 2); ¿Qué (diablos) es España? (Movistar Plus+); Desmontando Andalucía (Canal Sur); Disfruta Madrid (Telemadrid); El condensador de fluzo (La 2); Órbita Laika (La 2) | Best Show (Children): Enreda2 (Canal Sur TV); Dupi (ClanTV, RTVE, NTR Netherlands); Equipo planeta (Castilla La Mancha-Media); Jasmine & Jambo (Súper 3, TV3, IB3); La casa de los retos (Boing); Trazo crítico (À Punt Media) |
| Best Show (News): Informe Semanal: 50 aniversario (La 1); Amén: Francisco responde (Disney+/Star); Antena 3 Noticias (Antena 3); Cuatro al día (Cuatro); Españoles en conflictos (La 1); Especial Ucrania, un año de guerra (ETB1/ETB2) | Best Camera Direction: Ferrán Armengol — Tu cara me suena (Antena 3); Álvaro Santamarina, Gerardo Ferreras — La Voz (Antena 3); Javier Ruiz — Traitors España (HBO MAX); Jordi Évole, Marius Sánchez — Amén: Francisco responde (Disney+/Star); Jordi Vives, Rafael Gómez Rojas — Dúos increíbles (La 1); Raúl Vaquero, Ainhoa Clemente — Influencers: sobrevivir a las redes (Prime Video) |

=== Jesús Hermida Lifetime Achievement Award ===
- Pedro Piqueras
