= Zoe Stein =

Catalan actress (born 2000)

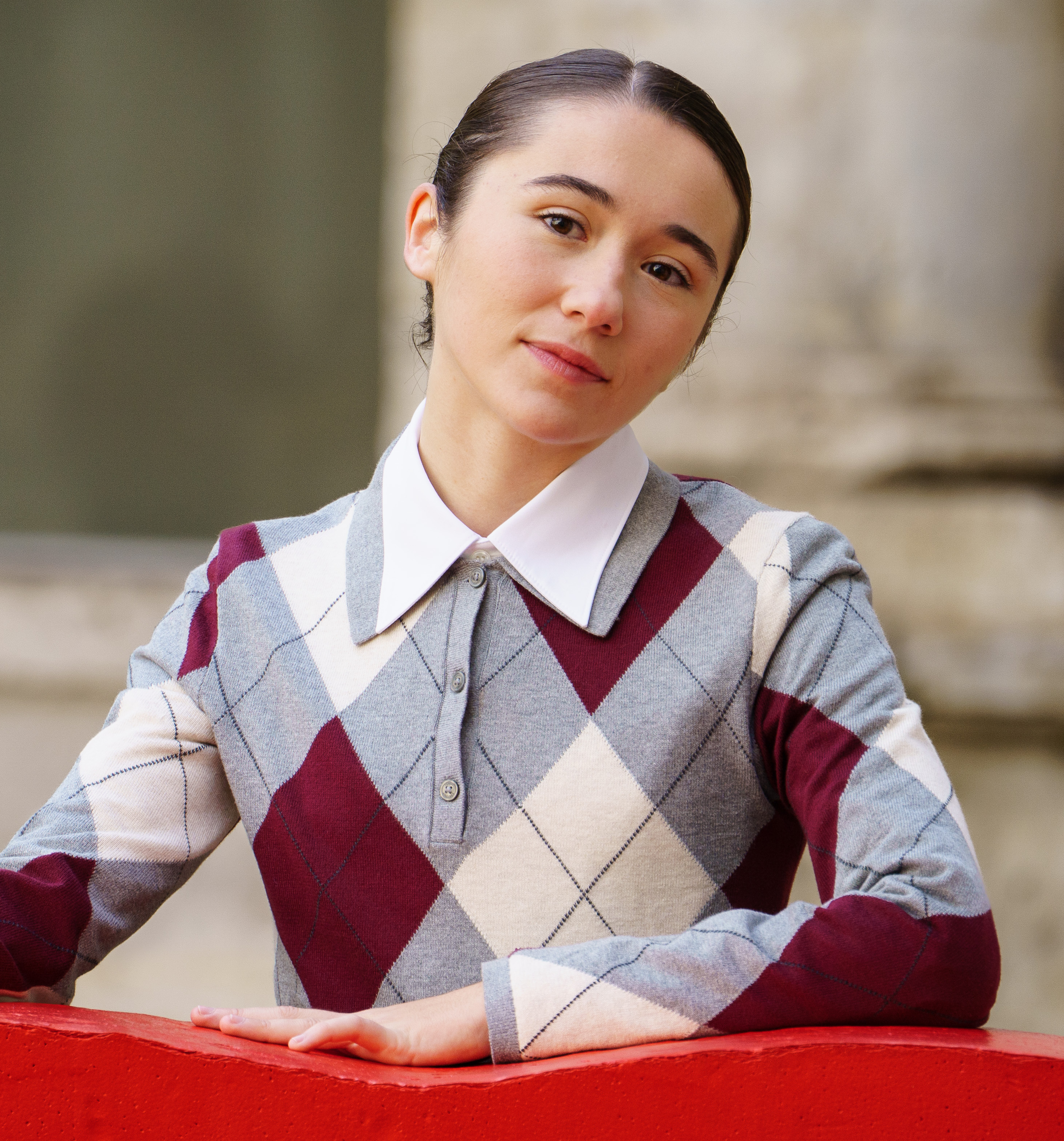
- Stein in 2025
- Born: 2000 (age 25–26); Barcelona, Catalonia, Spain
- Occupation: Actress

Zoe Stein (born 2000) is an actress from Catalonia, Spain.

== Biography ==
Zoe Stein was born in Barcelona in 2000, to a German father. She trained at London-based City Academy. At age 18, she moved to Berlin to work in theatre. Her performance in Lucía Aleñar's 2020 short film Forastera (which debuted at the Cannes' Directors' Fortnight), allowed her to land a starring role in feature film Manticore (2022), earning a nomination to the Goya Award for Best New Actress for her performance playing Diana.

Prior to the release of the aforementioned film by Carlos Vermut, Stein appeared in television series Merlí: Sapere Aude, Blowing Kisses, and La caza. Tramuntana, as well as wrapped shooting of television series The Invisible Girl, starring as lead character Julia.

In 2025, she featured in Danke für Nichts, in the full-length follow-up to Forastera (also titled Forastera), and in the spy thriller Sofia's Suspicion.

== Accolades ==
| Year | Award | Category | Work | Result | Ref. |
|---|---|---|---|---|---|
| 2023 | 15th Gaudí Awards | Best New Performance | Manticore | Nominated | |
| 2023 | 78th CEC Medals | Best New Actress | Manticore | Nominated | |
| 2023 | 37th Goya Awards | Best New Actress | Manticore | Nominated | |
| 2024 | 25th Iris Awards | Best Actress | The Invisible Girl | Nominated | |
