= The Invisible Girl (TV series) =

Spanish television series

- Spanish: La chica invisible
- Genre: Drama thriller
- Created by: Tito López Amado; Aritz Moreno
- Based on: La chica invisible by Blue Jeans
- Starring: Zoe Stein; Daniel Grao
- Country of origin: Spain
- Original language: Spanish
- No. of seasons: 1
- No. of episodes: 8

Original release
- Network: Disney+
- Release: February 15, 2023

The Invisible Girl (Spanish: La chica invisible) is a Spanish mystery thriller television series based on La chica invisible, the first installment of young adult book trilogy by Blue Jeans. It stars Zoe Stein and Daniel Grao. The series premiered on Disney+ on 15 February 2023.

== Premise ==
Set in the fictional sleepy Andalusian village of 'Cárdena', the plot follows a daughter and her father, both involved in the investigation pertaining the murder of a teenage girl.

== Cast ==
- Daniel Grao as Miguel Ángel
- Zoe Stein as Julia Plaza
- Rebeca Matellán as Virginia
- Pablo Gómez-Pando as Jona
- Javier Córdoba as Emi
- Marta Vallés as Aurora
- Hugo Welzel as Iván
- Tábata Cerezo as Maite
- Font García as Motero
- Tamara Arias as Alicia
- Juan Carlos Villanueva as Lázaro
- Julián Candón as Jesús
- José Bustos as Ferrer
- Numa Paredes as Vanesa
- Juanfra Juárez as Fernando
- Marta Hoyos as Patri

== Production ==
The series is based on the novel by Blue Jeans and its writing team includes Carmen López-Areal, Marina Efron, Antonio Hernández Centeno, Ramón Tarrés, and Ian de la Rosa. Tito López Amado and Aritz Moreno took over direction duties. Produced by Morena Films, the series was primarily shot in Carmona, although some footage was filmed in El Viso del Alcor and Gerena.

== Release ==
Beta Film has international distribution rights except North America, Latin America, Asia-Pacific and Iberia. The Invisible Girl received a pre-screening at Carmona's Teatro Cerezo. The 8-episode season was released in Spain on Disney+ on 15 February 2023.

== Accolades ==
Year	Award	Category	Nominee(s)	Result	Ref.
2024	25th Iris Awards	Best Fiction		Nominated	
2024	25th Iris Awards	Best Fiction Cinematography	Néstor Calvo	Nominated	
2024	25th Iris Awards	Best Actor	Daniel Grao	Nominated	
2024	25th Iris Awards	Best Actor	Zoe Stein	Nominated	
2024	32nd Actors and Actresses Union Awards	Best Television Actor in a Secondary Role	Pablo Gómez-Pando	Nominated	
