= Nights in Tefía =

2023 Spanish television series

- Promotional release poster
- Spanish: Las noches de Tefía
- Created by: Miguel del Arco
- Written by: Miguel del Arco; Antonio Rojano
- Directed by: Miguel del Arco; Rómulo Aguillaume
- Starring: Marcos Ruiz; Patrick Criado; Miquel Fernández; Roberto Álamo; Raúl Prieto; Israel Elejalde; Javier Ruesga; Luifer Rodríguez; Carolina Yuste
- Country of origin: Spain
- Original language: Spanish
- No. of seasons: 1
- No. of episodes: 6

Production
- Production companies: Buendía Estudios; Atresmedia Televisión

Original release
- Network: Atresplayer Premium
- Release: 25 June 2023

Nights in Tefía (Spanish: Las noches de Tefía) is a 2023 Spanish drama television series created, co-written and co-directed by Miguel del Arco. It is set in a Francoist concentration camp for vagrants, dissidents and homosexuals in the island of Fuerteventura.

== Plot ==
Told from the account of and old Airam Betancor in 2004, the plot delves into the repression and abuses but also the camaraderie that he experienced in the 1960s in the Colonia Agrícola Penitenciaria de Tefía, a Francoist concentration camp for the re-education of homosexuals in Fuerteventura, Canary Islands.

== Cast ==
- Marcos Ruiz as Airam Betancor (young) / La Bambi
- Patrick Criado as La Vespa
- Miquel Fernández as Charli
- Roberto Álamo as La Viga
- Luifer Rodríguez as La Pinito
- Ciro Miró as Carlavilla
- Jorge Yumar as Perico
- Mingo Ávila as La Rata
- Jorge Perugorría as Airam Betancor (old)
- Raúl Prieto as Boncho
- Israel Elejalde as Don Anselmo
- Javier Ruesga as La Sissi
- Carolina Yuste as Nisa
- Jorge Usón as Conde Fénix
- José Luis de Madariaga as La Vespa
- José Luis García-Pérez as El Andaluz
- Ana Wagener as Agueda
- Celeste González as La Sissi
- Horacio Colomé as Carlos
- Maykol Hernández as Miguel
- Isaac dos Santos as Caranabo
- José Gimeno as Don Bernabé
- Elisa Cano as Nisa

== Production ==
The series was produced by Buendía Estudios alongside Atresmedia.

== Release ==
The first two episodes received a pre-screening at the Cine Albéniz, as a part of the 'Pantalla TV' section of the 26th Málaga Film Festival. The series will premiere on Atresplayer Premium on 25 June 2023.

== Accolades ==
Year	Award	Category	Nominee(s)	Result	Ref.
2023	70th Ondas Awards	Best Television Actor	Patrick Criado	Won	
2024	25th Iris Awards	Best Fiction		Nominated	
2024	25th Iris Awards	Best Fiction Production	Montse García, Sonia Martínez	Nominated	
2024	25th Iris Awards	Best Fiction Screenplay	Miguel del Arco, Antonio Rojano	Nominated	
2024	25th Iris Awards	Best Actor	Patrick Criado	Nominated	
2024	35th GLAAD Media Awards	Outstanding Spanish-language Scripted Television Series		Won	
