= Patrick Criado =

Spanish actor

- Criado in 2026
- Born: Patrick Criado de la Puerta; 23 September 1995 (age 31); Madrid, Spain
- Occupation: Actor

Patrick Criado de la Puerta (born 23 September 1995) is a Spanish actor. He became popular for his role in the TV series Águila Roja. He has also performed in series such as Mar de plástico, Unauthorized Living, Riot Police, Money Heist, and Nights in Tefía. His film credits include performances in Family United (2013) and The Red Virgin (2024).

He is the recipient of various accolades, including two Actors and Actresses Union Awards and one Feroz Award.

== Life and career ==
Born on 23 September 1995 in Madrid, he was raised in the neighborhood of La Elipa. He had his debut in a television series in 2005, performing a guest role in Amar en tiempos revueltos. He performed the role of Lucas in the TV series Con dos tacones, aired in 2006 on La 1.

Criado had his debut in a feature film in 2007, performing the role of Simón in 13 Roses. He was given a main cast role in the popular adventure series Águila Roja in 2009, playing the character of the smug and classist Nuño de Santillana, which earned Criado popularity at age 14.

Criado starred as Efraín in the 2013 film La gran familia española, directed by Daniel Sánchez Arévalo. His performance in the film earned him a nomination to the Goya Award for Best New Actor. He joined the cast of Money Heist's Part 5 in 2020, playing Rafael, the son of Berlin.

His portrayal of Abel Vilella, member of the Socialist Youth and love interest of Hildegart Rodríguez, in Paula Ortiz's historical drama The Red Virgin (2024) earned him an Actors and Actresses Union Award for Best Film Actor in a Secondary Role.

In May 2025, he was reported to have been cast in Pedro Almodóvar's Bitter Christmas.

== Filmography ==
=== Television ===
Year	Title	Role	Notes	Ref.
2006	Con dos tacones	Lucas	8 episodes	
2009–15	Águila Roja	Nuño de Santillana		
2015–16	Mar de plástico	Fernando Rueda		
2016	El padre de Caín	Ander		
2018–20	Vivir sin permiso (Unauthorized Living)	Daniel Arteaga Vargas		
2020	La línea invisible	Txema		
2020	Antidisturbios (Riot Police)	Rubén Murillo		
2021	La casa de papel (Money Heist)	Rafael		
2023	Las noches de Tefía (Nights in Tefía)	La Vespa		

=== Film ===
Year	Title	Role	Notes	Ref.
2007	Las 13 rosas (13 Roses)	Simón		
2011	Águila Roja: La película (Red Eagle, the Movie)	Nuño	Reprise of role in TV series	
2013	La gran familia española (Family United)	Efraín		
2014	Todos están muertos (They Are All Dead)	Víctor		
2014	El club de los incomprendidos (The Misfits Club)	César		
2016	1898, Los últimos de Filipinas (1898, Our Last Men in the Philippines)	Private Juan		
2021	Bajocero (Below Zero)	Nano		
2023	Bird Box Barcelona	Rafa		
2024	La virgen roja (The Red Virgin)	Abel Vilella		
2026	Amarga Navidad (Bitter Christmas)	Bonifacio		
2026	Karateka	Jesús del Moral		
2026	Una familia (A Family)	Enrique		

== Accolades ==
Year	Award	Category	Work	Result	Ref.
2014	28th Goya Awards	Best New Actor	Family United	Nominated	
2017	4th Feroz Awards	Best Supporting Actor in a Series	Mar de plástico	Nominated	
2021	8th Feroz Awards	Best Supporting Actor in a Series	Riot Police	Won	
2021	8th Platino Awards	Best Supporting Actor in a Miniseries or TV Series	Riot Police	Nominated	
2022	30th Actors and Actresses Union Awards	Best TV Actor in a Minor Role	Riot Police	Won	
2024	25th Iris Awards	Best Actor	Nights in Tefía	Nominated	
2024	11th Feroz Awards	Best Main Actor in a Series	Nights in Tefía	Nominated	
2025	33rd Actors and Actresses Union Awards	Best Film Actor in a Secondary Role	The Red Virgin	Won	
