= Antonio Burgos =

Spanish journalist and writer (1943–2023)

Antonio Burgos Belinchón (30 May 1943 – 20 December 2023) was a Spanish traditionalist-conservative journalist, novelist and multi-media writer.

Burgos graduated in philosophy and literature from the University of Seville and in classical philology from the Autonomous University of Madrid.

Burgos died on 20 December 2023, at the age of 80.

== Books ==
(in Spanish)

- Gatos I
- La historia de gatos
- Alegatos de los Gatos
- Rapsodia Española
- Gatos sin fronteras
- Gatos II
- Alegatos de los Gatos
- Juanito Valderrama
- Gatos sin fronteras
- Artículos de lujo
- Juanito Valderrama
- Jazmines en el ojal
- Las cabañuelas de agosto
- Mirando al mar soñé
- Reloj, no marques las horas
- Mi España querida
- Artículos de lujo
- El contrabandista de pájaros
