= Pavel Anton =

Moldavan composer (1936–2026)

- Born: 19 September 1936; Horodiște, Romania (now Moldova)
- Died: 13 October 2026 (aged 90)
- Occupations: Composer; Musicologist; Conductor; Academic teacher

Pavel Anton (19 September 1936 – 13 October 2026) was a Moldovan composer, musicologist, conductor and academic teacher.

== Life and career ==
Born in Horodiște, in the Kingdom of Romania (now in Moldova), on 19 September 1936,

Anton taught for 25 years at the Pedagogical Institute in Bălți, teaching choral conducting, musical arrangement and folk music. He conducted the student folk choir on international stages such as Gaudeamus festival in Vilnius in 1968 and choral events in Tallinn in 1969. He conducted the Bălți teachers folk choir for 17 years, leading it to gold medals at national competitions.

From 1989 to 2002, Anton taught choral conducting and music education methodology at the Academy of Music in Chișinău. He authored music textbooks, music for educational purposes, music methods, scientific articles, original compositions and adaptations of folk music for choirs.

Anton was awarded the distinction Eminent of education and culture and was listed in the Book of Honour of Moldova.

Anton died on 13 October 2026, at the age of 90.
