= Daniel Grao =

Spanish actor

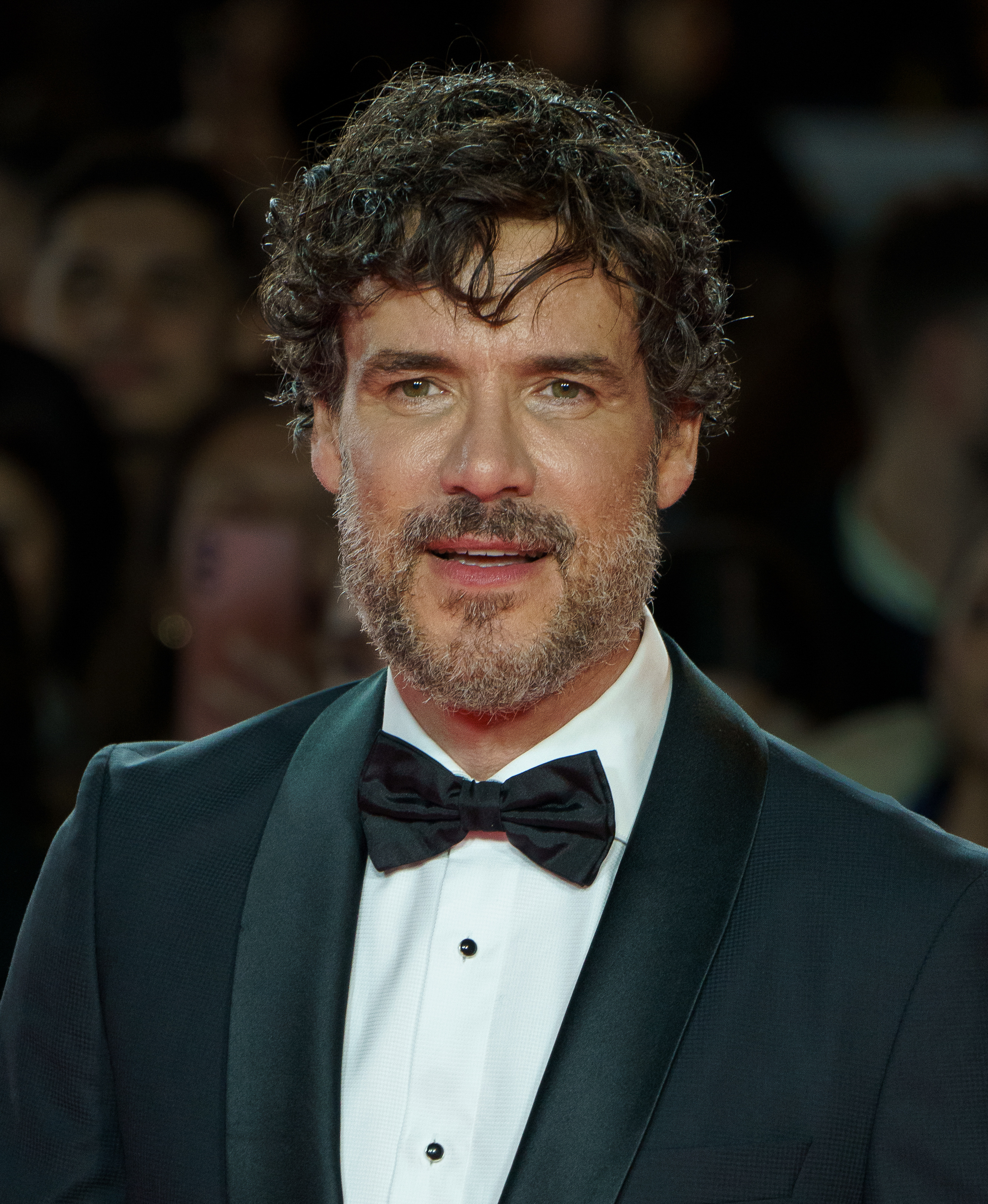
- Grao in 2025
- Born: Daniel Grao Valle; February 17, 1976 (age 50); Sabadell, Catalonia, Spain
- Occupation: Actor
- Years active: 2001–present
- Children: 2

Daniel Grao Valle (born 17 February 1976) is a Spanish actor. He is known for his performances in television series such as Luna, el misterio de Calenda or Sin identidad, or his lead role in the biopic miniseries about Mario Conde.

== Biography ==
Born in 1976 in Sabadell, Catalonia, he discovered acting thanks to a high school teacher in Caldes de Montbui, where he lived with his family, becoming a member of an amateur theatrical group.

Grao had his debut as a television actor in the Catalan regional broadcaster TV3, with performances in shows such as Temps de silenci and El cor de la ciutat. A native Spanish-language speaker, he declared in 2020 that he reportedly moved to Madrid because of TV3, as in his first performances in the channel's shows "the accent was not on the quality of the performance but on the way he pronounced the 's's" (in Catalan).

His debut in a feature film came in 2003 with a minor role in La flaqueza del bolchevique. While he had previously performed in several stage plays, he landed his first major stage role with La avería.

He earned some recognition with performances in the TV series Amistades peligrosas and Sin tetas no hay paraíso, whereas Acusados (2009–2010) brought him further popularity. His performance in the Pedro Almodóvar's film Julieta (2016) further consolidated his career.

He played the role of Rafael Rodríguez Rapún in the play La piedra oscura, that debuted in January 2015 at the Teatro María Guerrero.

He landed the role of Bernat Estanyol (the father of the lead character) in the 2018 series La catedral del mar. He starred in the TV series Stolen Away, aired in 2020 on Antena 3, playing the lead character Antonio Santos.

== Personal life ==
Since 2004, Grao has been in a relationship with Florencia Fernández, with whom he has two children, Mirko and Guido.

== Filmography ==
=== Television ===
Year	Title	Role	Notes	Ref.
2006	Amistades peligrosas	David		
2008	Sin tetas no hay paraíso			
2009–10	Acusados	Jorge Vega		
2011	Ángel o demonio	Valafar		
2013	Mario Conde. Los días de gloria	Mario Conde	Lead character. TV movie aired as 2-episode miniseries	
2013	Luna, el misterio de Calenda	Raúl Pando		
2014	Prim, el asesinato de la calle del Turco	José María Pastor	TV movie	
2014–15	Sin identidad	Juan Prados		
2015	Los nuestros			
2016	La sonata del silencio (The Sonata of Silence)	Antonio		
2018	La catedral del mar (Cathedral of the Sea)	Bernat Estanyol		
2018–19	Gigantes	Tomás Guerrero		
2019	Promesas de arena	Andy		
2020	Perdida (Stolen Away)	Antonio Santos	Lead character	
2020	HIT	Hugo Ibarra Toledo, "HIT"	Lead character	
2023	La chica invisible	Miguel Ángel		

=== Film ===
Key
†	Denotes films that have not yet been released

Year	Title	Role	Notes	Ref.
2012	Fin (The End)	Félix		
2014	Café para llevar (Coffee to go)	Javi	Short film	
2015	Palmeras en la nieve (Palm Trees in the Snow)	Manuel		
2016	Julieta	Xoan		
2016	Acantilado (The Cliff)	Gabriel		
2018	Animales sin collar (Unbridled)	Abel		
2018	El árbol de la sangre (The Tree of Blood)	Víctor		
2020	El año de la furia (The Year of Fury)	Rojas		
2020	El inconveniente (One Careful Owner)	Daniel		
2022	La casa entre los cactus (The House among the Cactuses)	Emilio		
2023	El club de los lectores criminales (Killer Book Club)	Antonio Cruzado		
2024	Yo no soy esa	Pepo		
2024	El cuento del lobo	Javier		
2025	La huella del mal (The Cavern Crimes)	Daniel Velarde		

== Accolades ==
Year	Award	Category	Work	Result	Ref.
2010	19th Actors and Actresses Union Awards	Best New Actor	Acusados	Nominated	
2012	21st Actors and Actresses Union Awards	Best Stage Actor in a Secondary Role	La avería	Won	
2022	9th Feroz Awards	Best Main Actor in a Series	HIT	Nominated	
2022	24th Iris Awards	Best Actor	HIT	Nominated	
2024	25th Iris Awards	Best Actor	The Invisible Girl	Nominated	
2026	27th Iris Awards	Best Actor	Ángela	Nominated	
