= Carolina Yuste =

Spanish actress (born 1991)

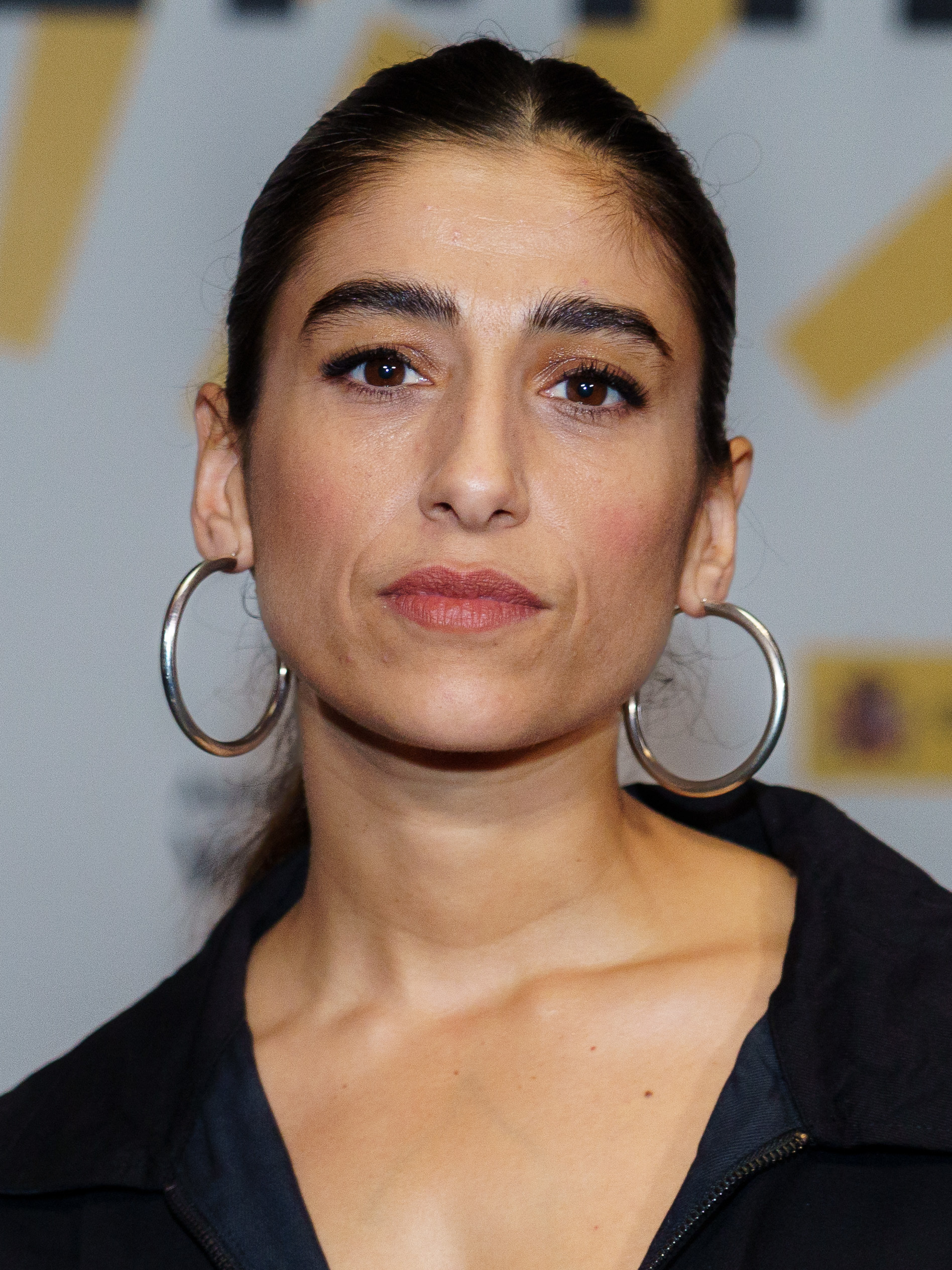
- Yuste in 2025
- Born: Carolina Ortega Yuste; 30 July 1991 (age 35); Badajoz, Extremadura, Spain
- Education: RESAD
- Occupation: Actress

Carolina Ortega Yuste (born 30 July 1991) is a Spanish actress. She is the recipient of numerous accolades, including two Goya Awards. Her film credits include performances in Carmen & Lola (2018), Quién te cantará (2019), Sky High (2020), Jokes & Cigarettes (2023), and Undercover (2024). She has also featured in television series La sonata del silencio and Brigada Costa del Sol.

== Biography ==
Carolina Ortega Yuste was born on 30 July 1991 in Badajoz, Extremadura. She trained at the Real Escuela Superior de Arte Dramático (RESAD) in Madrid.

She won the Goya Award for Best Supporting Actress in 2019 for her role as Paqui in Carmen & Lola, her feature film debut. She made her Catalan-language debut in Jokes & Cigarettes (2023), portraying singer Conchita in a role that won her the Gaudí Award for Best Actress.

Yuste also joined the cast of the stage play Caperucita en Manhattan, based on the novel by Carmen Martín Gaite and scheduled to debut at Teatro de La Abadía on 23 January 2025.

== Filmography ==
Key
†	Denotes films that have not yet been released

=== Television ===
Year	Title	Role	Notes	Ref.
2016	La sonata del silencio (The Sonata of Silence)	Dorita		
2019	Brigada Costa del Sol (Drug Squad: Costa del Sol)	Sole		
2020–21	Dime quién soy (Dime quién soy: Mistress of War)	Lola		
2023	Sin huellas (No Traces)	Desi	Main	
2023	Las noches de Tefía (Nights in Tefía)	Nisa		
2025	La canción	Massiel		

=== Film ===
Year	Title	Role	Notes	Ref.
2018	Carmen y Lola (Carmen & Lola)	Paqui		
2020	Hasta el cielo (Sky High)	Estrella		
2021	El cover (The Cover)	Margarita	Amy Winehouse impersonator	
2021	Chavalas (Girlfriends)	Desi		
2021	Sevillanas de Brooklyn (When Brooklyn Met Seville)	Ana		
2021	La familia perfecta (The Perfect Family)	Sara		
2022	Girasoles silvestres (Wild Flowers)	Maite		
2023	Chinas (Chinas, a Second Generation Story)	Amaya		
2023	Saben aquell (Jokes & Cigarettes)	Conchita		
2024	La infiltrada (Undercover)	Mónica / Arantxa		
2027	La Roja †			
2027	Toda la suerte del mundo †	Ali		

== Accolades ==
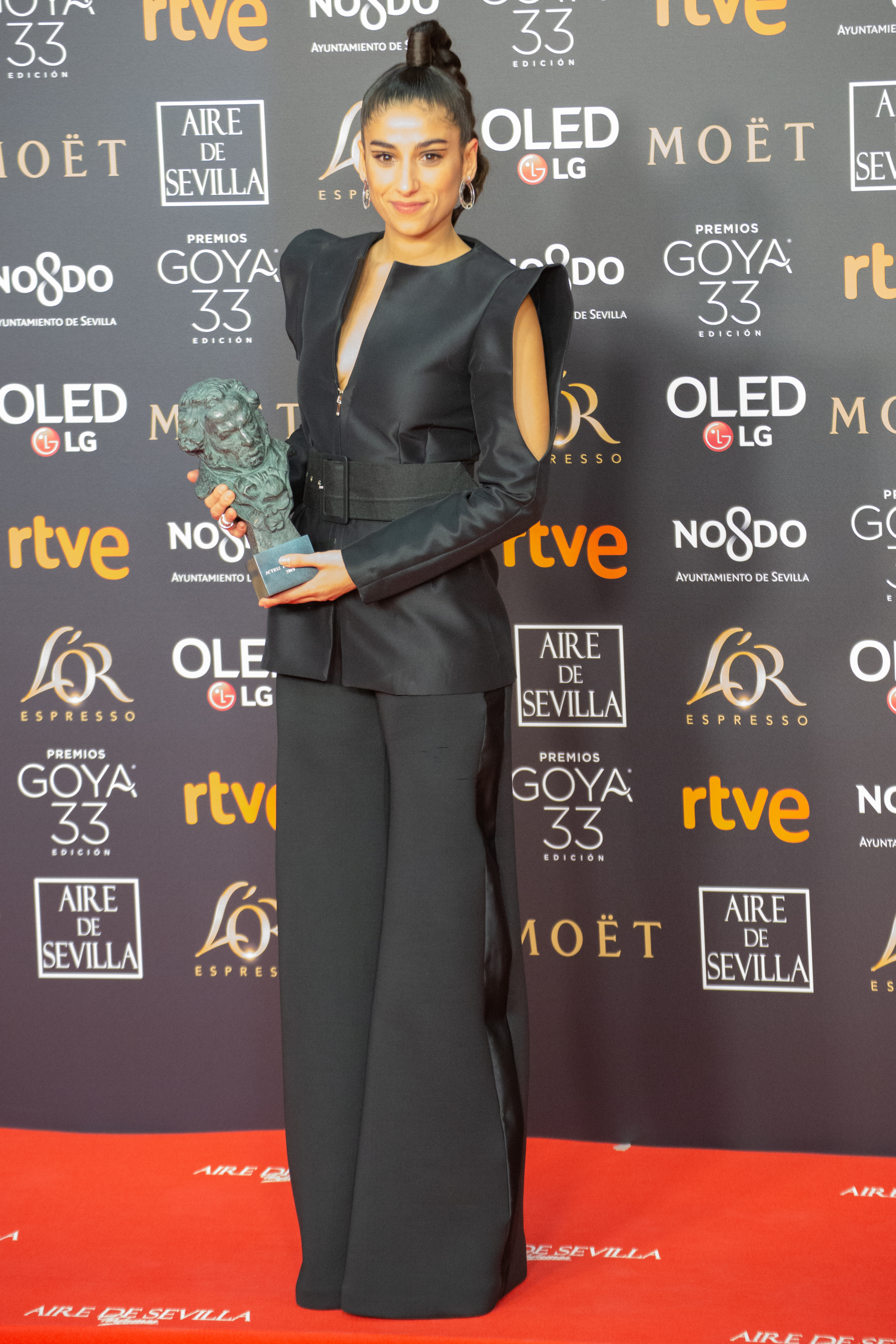
Carolina Yuste holding her Goya Award for Best Supporting Actress at the 33rd Goya Awards in 2019

Year	Award	Category	Work	Result	Ref.
2019	33rd Goya Awards	Best Supporting Actress	Carmen & Lola	Won	
2019	28th Actors and Actresses Union Awards	Best Film Actress in a Secondary Role	Carmen & Lola	Nominated	
2021	24th Max Awards	Best Actress	Prostitución	Nominated	
2021	4th Berlanga Awards	Best Supporting Actress	The Cover	Won	
2022	9th Feroz Awards	Best Supporting Actress	Girlfriends	Nominated	
2022	30th Actors and Actresses Union Awards	Best Film Actress in a Minor Role	Girlfriends	Nominated	
2024	11th Feroz Awards	Best Main Actress in a Film	Jokes & Cigarettes	Nominated	
2024	16th Gaudí Awards	Best Actress	Jokes & Cigarettes	Won	
2024	79th CEC Medals	Best Actress	Jokes & Cigarettes	Nominated	
2024	79th CEC Medals	Best Supporting Actress	Chinas, a Second Generation Story	Nominated	
2024	38th Goya Awards	Best Actress	Jokes & Cigarettes	Nominated	
2024	32nd Actors and Actresses Union Awards	Best Film Actress in a Leading Role	Jokes & Cigarettes	Nominated	
2024	11th Platino Awards	Best Actress	Jokes & Cigarettes	Nominated	
2024	30th Forqué Awards	Best Actress in a Film	Undercover	Won	
2025	12th Feroz Awards	Best Main Actress in a Film	Undercover	Nominated	
2025	80th CEC Awards	Best Actress	Undercover	Won	
2025	39th Goya Awards	Best Actress	Undercover	Won	
2025	33rd Actors and Actresses Union Awards	Best Film Actress in a Leading Role	Undercover	Won	
2025	12th Platino Awards	Best Actress	Undercover	Nominated	
2025	31st Forqué Awards	Best Actress in a Series	La canción	Nominated	
2026	13th Feroz Awards	Best Main Actress in a Series	La canción	Nominated	
2026	34th Actors and Actresses Union Awards	Best Television Actress in a Leading Role	La canción	Nominated	

== Views ==
In 2026, Yuste co-signed a manifesto promoted by FiSahara against the shooting of The Odyssey in Moroccan-occupied Western Sahara.
