= Clara Galle =

Spanish actress and model (born 2002)

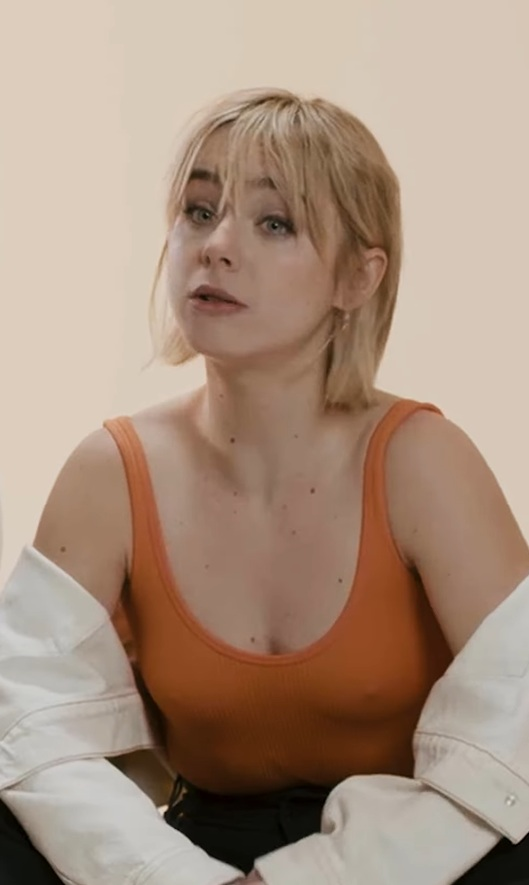
- Galle in 2023
- Born: Clara Huete Sánchez; 15 April 2002 (age 24); Pamplona, Navarre, Spain
- Education: Art history studies at the National University of Distance Education
- Occupations: Actress; model
- Years active: 2019–present

Clara Huete Sánchez (born 15 April 2002), known professionally as Clara Galle, is a Spanish actress and model. She is known for playing Raquel Mendoza in the Through My Window film trilogy, comprising Through My Window (2022), Through My Window: Across the Sea (2023), and Through My Window: Looking at You (2024), and Eva Merino in The Boarding School: Las Cumbres.

She has also played Amaia Olaberria in Olympo (2025) and Elena Arbizu in the limited series That Night (2026).

== Early life ==
Clara Huete Sánchez was born in Pamplona, Navarre, on 15 April 2002. She adopted the surname of her great-grandfather, photographer José Galle, for her stage name. From an early age, Galle showed an interest in acting and later completed upper-secondary studies in performing arts at the Instituto Plaza de la Cruz.

In 2020, she moved to Madrid. In a June 2023 interview with S Moda, she said that she was studying art history alongside her acting career. She also recalled practicing rhythmic gymnastics as a child.

In February 2022, Galle was studying art history through the National University of Distance Education. In a June 2023 interview with S Moda, she said that she continued studying art history alongside her acting career.

== Career ==
In April 2019, Galle filmed her first advertisement for the Tous Christmas campaign, which featured American actress Emma Roberts. She subsequently appeared in advertising campaigns for Andorran tourism and Fanta.

In October 2021, Galle starred in the music video for Sebastián Yatra's single "Tacones Rojos".

Galle made her film debut in 2022 as Raquel Mendoza, the female lead in Through My Window, directed by Marçal Forés and adapted from the novel by Ariana Godoy (Spanish-language article). She starred opposite Julio Peña Fernández; the two worked with an intimacy coach before filming their intimate scenes. The same year, she appeared as Eva Merino in the second season of The Boarding School: Las Cumbres.

Galle reprised her role as Raquel in Through My Window: Across the Sea (2023) and Through My Window: Looking at You (2024), completing the film trilogy.

In 2024, she starred as Greta, a friend of the protagonist Alma, in the Netflix miniseries Raising Voices (Ni una más). She also played Alba in the third and final season of the English-language thriller series The Head.

In February 2025, Galle starred alongside Mia Sala-Patau in Místicas, an eight-episode fiction podcast created by Carmen Pacheco and Manuel Bartual. The series follows two friends investigating the death of a video-game creator, played by Ricardo Gómez.

In June 2025, she starred as Amaia Olaberria, an artistic swimmer, in the Netflix sports drama Olympo. Her preparation included artistic swimming and strength training, with five training sessions per week. She also worked with a voice coach to alter her vocal delivery for the character.

In 2026, Galle starred alongside Claudia Salas and Paula Usero in the Netflix limited series That Night (Esa noche), adapted from the novel by Gillian McAllister. She played Elena Arbizu, the youngest of three sisters whose holiday in the Dominican Republic is disrupted by a fatal car accident. The series premiered on 13 March 2026.

In June 2026, Galle was announced as starring alongside Álvaro Cervantes in Iruña 97, a crime thriller directed by David Pérez Sañudo (Spanish-language article) for Movistar Plus+. Set during the 1997 San Fermín festival in Pamplona, the series casts her as Amaia, a municipal police officer investigating a woman's death. Filming began in Pamplona in July 2026.

== Filmography ==
=== Film ===
Year	Title	Role	Ref.
2022	Through My Window	Raquel Mendoza	
2023	Through My Window: Across the Sea	Raquel Mendoza	
2024	Through My Window: Looking at You	Raquel Mendoza	

=== Television ===
Year	Title	Role	Notes	Ref.
2022	The Boarding School: Las Cumbres	Eva Merino	Season 2	
2024	Raising Voices	Greta	Main role	
2024	The Head	Alba	Season 3	
2025	Olympo	Amaia Olaberria	Main role	
2026	That Night	Elena Arbizu	Main role; limited series	
TBA	Iruña 97	Amaia	Announced	

=== Audio series ===
Year	Title	Role	Notes	Ref.
2025	Místicas	Lola	Voice role	

=== Music videos ===
Year	Artist	Song	Ref.
2021	Sebastián Yatra	"Tacones Rojos"	
