= Seddon =

Seddon may refer to:

== People ==
- Seddon (surname)

== Places ==
=== Australia ===
- Hundred of Seddon, a cadastral unit in South Australia
  - Seddon Conservation Park, a protected area in South Australia
  - Seddon, South Australia, a locality
- Seddon, Victoria, a suburb
  - Seddon railway station

=== New Zealand ===
- Seddon, New Zealand, a town
- Seddonville, a locality

== See also ==
- Seddon Atkinson, former British vehicle manufacturer
