= Muso's Guide =

UK-based online magazine

Musos' Guide or musosguide is a UK-based online webzine. It was launched in 2003, and has been re-launched four times. It is an editorially independent magazine.

== History ==
Muso's Guide is an music website that was first launched on 30 June 2003 by then-amateur journalist Holly Seddon née Noseda.

According to the site's About Us page, "it was launched for a number of reasons, namely the lack of coverage of classic music alongside new releases, the oh-so-obvious press release drivel in a lot of music mags at the time, the desire to create a website full of city guides with music tourists in mind and the desire to get to listen to promo CDs all day. "In November 2012 ownership of the site passed from Holly to Joe Watson and long-time contributor Kenny McMurtrie with a view to maintaining the already high quality of coverage and expanding the site’s reach. We still want to cover the classics and the best new music. We still bristle at the press release drivel and regurgitated guff but city guides have died a death. Now we listen to Radio 6 all day and have resurrected our Underexposed tab to get closer to the grass roots of the music scene. How things have changed..."

Since 2003 the site has had a number of editors in all areas - Catherine Wilson, Natalie Shaw, Greg Salter, Louise Coles, Paul Brown, Russell Warfield, Hayley Scott, Dani Gibson, Carris Boast, Elliot Ryder, Cat Schaupp, Dave Beech, Lee Hammond, Rosie Duffield and Holly Seddon née Noseda.

The site is among the first (and longest lasting) music webzines of the internet age in the UK.

As of October 2021 the site's team appears to consist of:-

- Joe Watson Jnr - Performance Manager

"Joe operates out of Barrhead in Glasgow & will clean the table with you at both chess and poker".

- Marky Edison - News Editor
- Steven Velentzas - Instagram Guru

== Awards ==
In November 2009, Muso's Guide was shortlisted for Best Digital Publication and Best Blog in the Record of the Day Awards.

== Versions ==
The original version of the website was produced using Microsoft FrontPage and each new article had to be manually created, there was no content management system.

The next version was launched in 2004 and had a PHP content management system.

Another version was launched in 2008, and was built using WordPress.

Following the corruption of the Wordpress version by an as yet undiagnosed cause the latest version was launched in 2014, and was built using Joomla. At this time the apostrophe moved to the other side of the second S in Musos.

== Offline activities ==
In October 2009, Muso's Guide put on its first offline event, Muso's Guide presents... Extradition Order, Arrows Of Love and Bethia Beadman.

On 30 October 2009, it put on its first Pic n Mixx event at the Buffalo Bar in London. The event's promotion included Everett True contributing a mix tape.

In October 2017 the site was asked to host a gig during that year's Blogtober, organised by Lost In The Manor. The headliners were Dublin's Makings.

== Media appearances ==
In June 2009, days after Michael Jackson died, Muso's Guide then-editor Natalie Shaw was invited onto Sky News to discuss the singer's musical legacy and impact.

== Exclusives ==
On 4 May 2009, Muso's Guide contributor Paul Wilson was given access to Lynval Golding and John Bradbury of The Specials.
