= That Night (TV series) =

2026 Spanish television series

- Release poster
- Genre: Thriller
- Based on: That Night by Gillian McAllister
- Written by: Jason George; Lara Sendim
- Directed by: Jorge Dorado; Liliana Torres
- Starring: Clara Galle; Claudia Salas; Paula Usero
- Country of origin: Spain
- Original language: Spanish
- No. of episodes: 6

Production
- Executive producers: Jason George; Marian Fernández Pascal
- Cinematography: Pau Castejón
- Camera setup: Multi-camera
- Running time: 38–46 mins
- Production company: Txintxua Films

Original release
- Network: Netflix
- Release: March 13, 2026

That Night (Spanish: Esa Noche) is a Spanish thriller television series created by Jason George, based on the novel of the same name. Produced under Txintxua Films, it stars Clara Galle, Claudia Salas and Paula Usero. The series premiered on Netflix on March 13, 2026.

== Cast ==
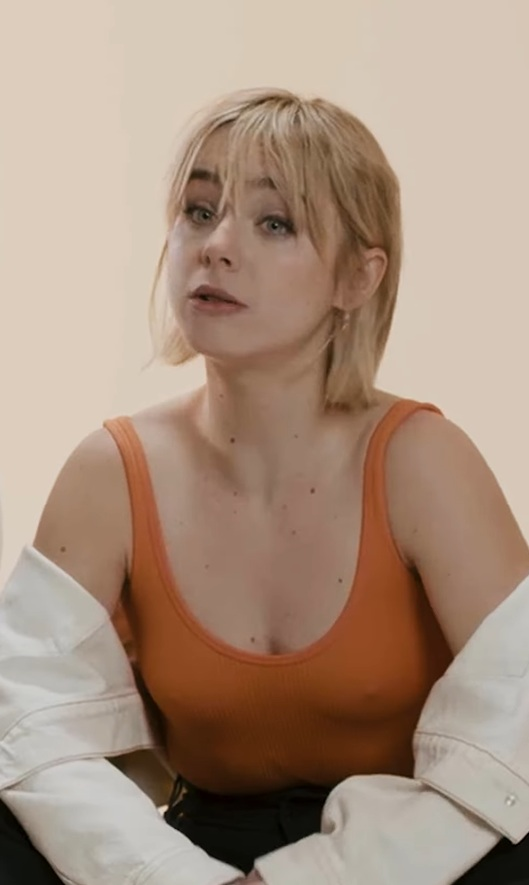
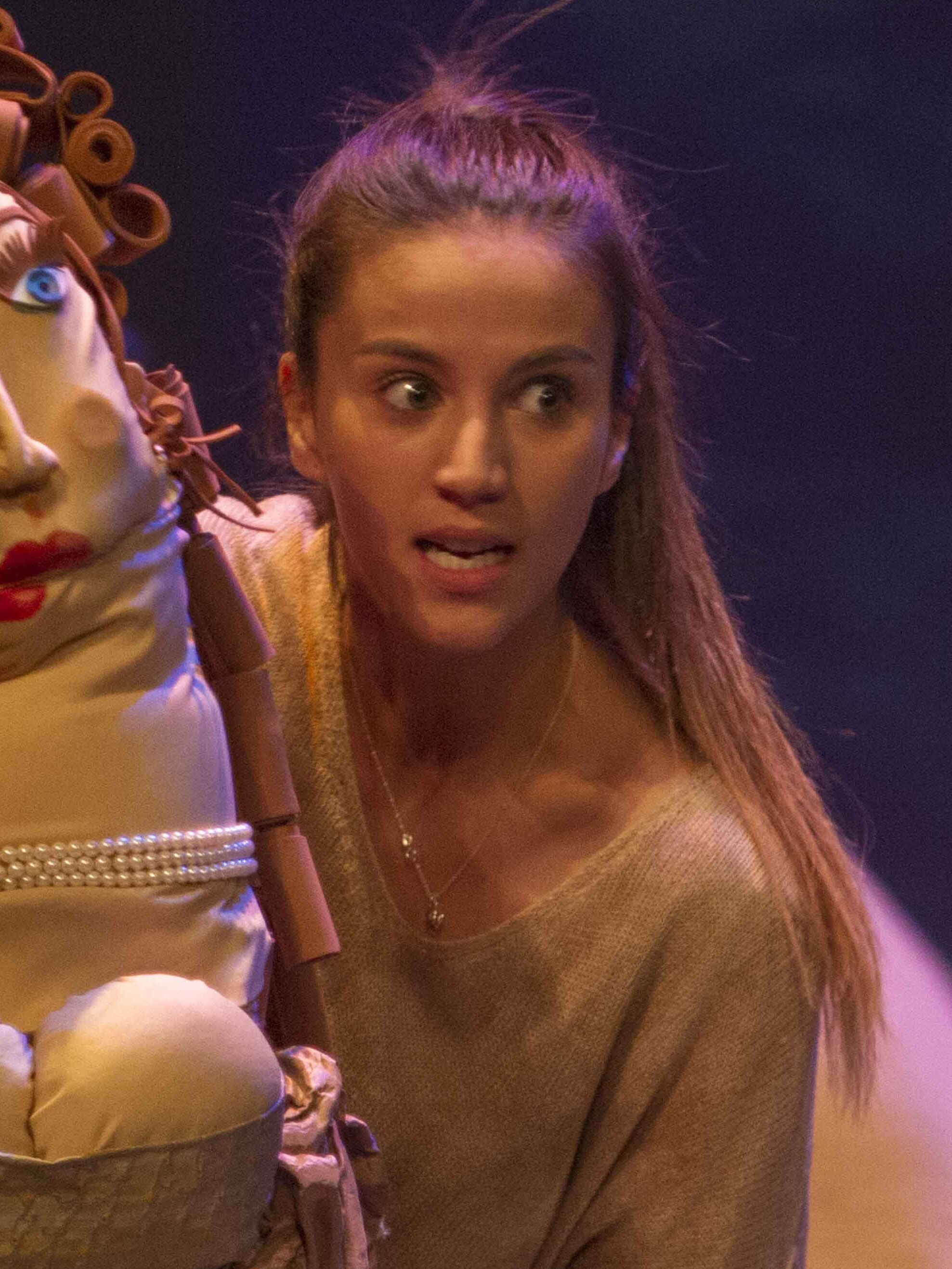
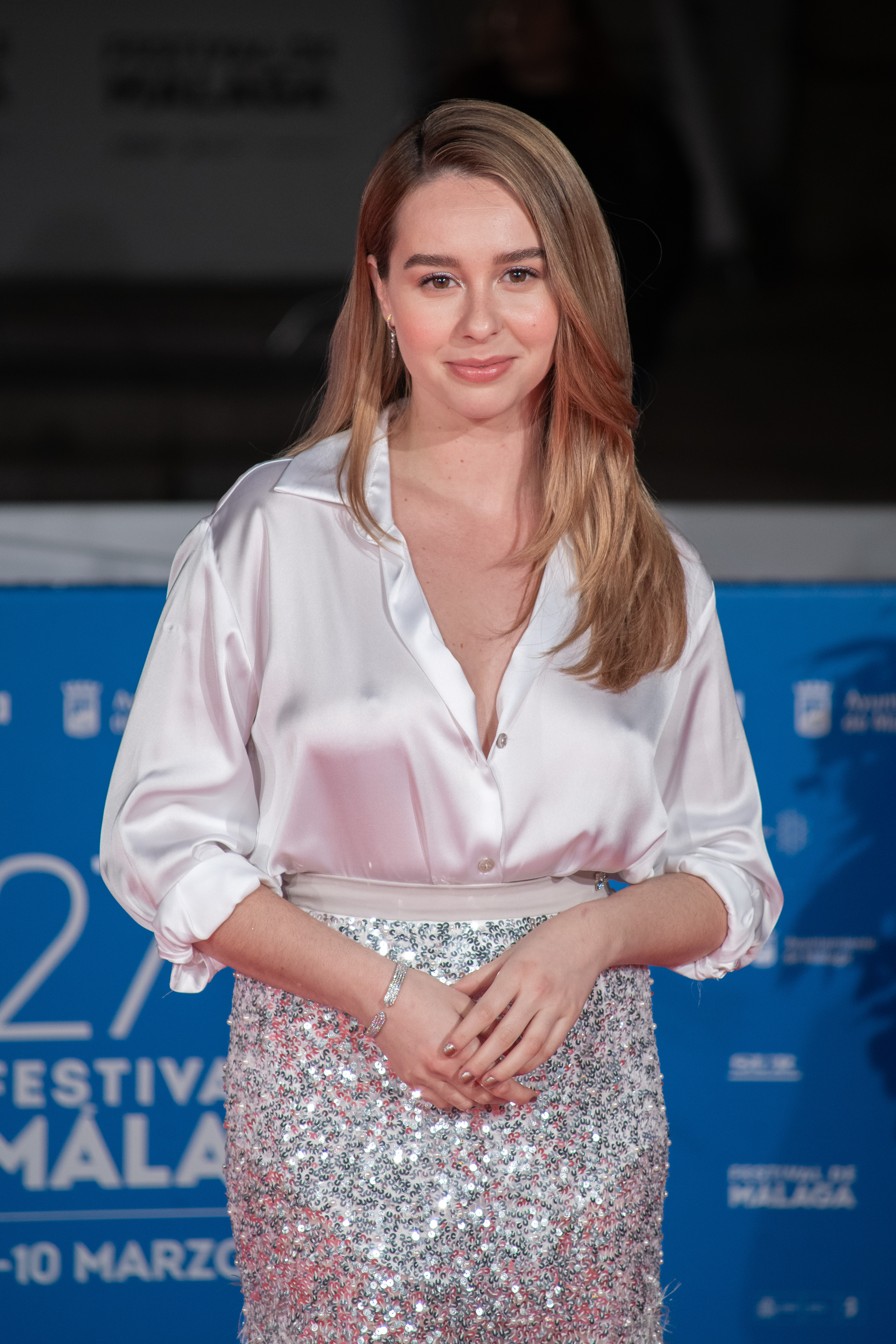
Clara Galle (in 2023), Claudia Salas (in 2018) and Paula Usero (in 2024).
- Clara Galle as Elena
- Claudia Salas as Paula
- Paula Usero as Cris
- Pedro Casablanc as Beltrán
- Nüll García as Luisa
- Raidher Díaz as Zahi
- Gabriel Polanco as Tito
- Alícia Falcó as Ane
- Pablo Zito as Ricardo
- Ignacio Visca as journalist
- Sonya Peña as masseuse
- Peio Etxarri as Rafa
- Luis del Valle as Bartolo

== Production ==
The series, which based on novel of the same name by Gillian McAllister, was officially commissioned by Netflix. Jorge Dorado and Liliana Torres serving as director and the script is penned by Jason George and Lara Sendim, while Txintxua Films managed the production. Clara Galle, Claudia Salas and Paula Usero were cast as the leads. Principal photography began in February 2025 in the Dominican Republic. Production subsequently moved to Spain, with sequences filmed at the Santa Engrazia in Zestoa, Gipuzkoa and the Palacio de Congresos y Auditorio de Navarra in Pamplona, Navarre. Filming wrapped in May 2025.

== Music ==
Esa Noche

Soundtrack album by Aitor Etxebarria
- Released: March 13, 2026
- Genre: Soundtrack
- Length: 40:44
- Language: Spanish
- Label: Netflix Music

Track listing
No.	Title	Length
1.	"No Abras la Boca"	0:37
2.	"Día 1"	1:43
3.	"Elena, Cris y Paula"	1:44
4.	"El Secreto"	1:18
5.	"La Extraña Belleza de la Mentira"	1:18
6.	"En la Oscuridad"	1:30
7.	"Los Pasos de Ama"	1:12
8.	"Jungla"	1:06
9.	"Esa Noche, That Night"	1:03
10.	"Caos en La Jungla"	2:51
11.	"Sauna y Mentiras"	1:20
12.	"Cris"	0:41
13.	"Paula en la Farmacia"	1:05
14.	"Resort"	1:00
15.	"Elena"	0:48
16.	"Desesperación"	1:57
17.	"Es la Poli"	0:29
18.	"El Retorno"	1:03
19.	"Extraña Verdad"	2:51
20.	"Gris"	0:49
21.	"Lo Que Realmente Pasó"	3:14
22.	"Ane"	1:52
23.	"Contra y Sub"	0:53
24.	"Draft 3"	2:19
25.	"Es un Policia"	1:15
26.	"Drive My Car"	1:38
27.	"Fiesta en Dominicana"	1:20
28.	"Hermanas"	1:34
Total length:		40:44

== Release ==
The trailer of the series was released on February 12, 2026. The series was made available to stream exclusively on Netflix on March 13, 2026.

== Reception ==
Lucas Barquero of Cinemanía, Laura Martinez of Los Lunes Seriéfilos, Diego Lerer of Micropsiacine and Enric Albero of Serielizados reviewed the series.

== See also ==
- 2026 in Spanish television
