= Seddon, South Australia =

Seddon
- Town
- Coordinates: 35.853070°S 137.313220°E
- Country: Australia
- State: South Australia
- Region: Fleurieu and Kangaroo Island
- LGA: Kangaroo Island Council
- Location: 151 km (94 mi) south-west of Adelaide; 37 km (23 mi) south-west of Kingscote
- Established: 2002

Government
  - State electorate: Mawson
  - Federal division: Mayo

Population
  - Total: 107 (SAL 2021)
- Time zone: UTC+9:30 (ACST)
  - Summer (DST): UTC+10:30 (ACST)
- Postcode: 5223
- County: County of Carnarvon
- Mean max temp: 21.0 °C (69.8 °F)
- Mean min temp: 9.0 °C (48.2 °F)
- Annual rainfall: 444.0 mm (17.48 in)
Localities around Seddon
| Duncan | Duncan; Parndana; Cassini | Cassini |
| Newland | Seddon | Kohinoor; MacGillivray |
| Vivonne Bay | Vivonne Bay; Seal Bay | MacGillivray |
- Coordinates; Locations; Climate; Adjoining localities

Seddon is a locality in the Australian state of South Australia located on Kangaroo Island about 151 kilometres (94 mi) south-west of the state capital of Adelaide and about 37 kilometres (23 mi) south-west of the municipal seat of Kingscote.

Its boundaries were created in March 2002 for the “long established name” which was derived from the cadastral unit of the Hundred of Seddon in which it is located.

Seddon is bounded by the Playford Highway and the town of Parndana to the north and by the South Coast Road in part to the south. The principal land use in the locality is primary production with exception to land reserved for conservation purposes as the Seddon Conservation Park and land adjoining the town of Parndana which is zoned for residential and commercial purposes.

Seddon is located within the federal division of Mayo, the state electoral district of Mawson and the local government area of the Kangaroo Island Council.

== See also ==
- Seddon (disambiguation)
