= Agustín Della Corte =

Uruguayan rugby union player

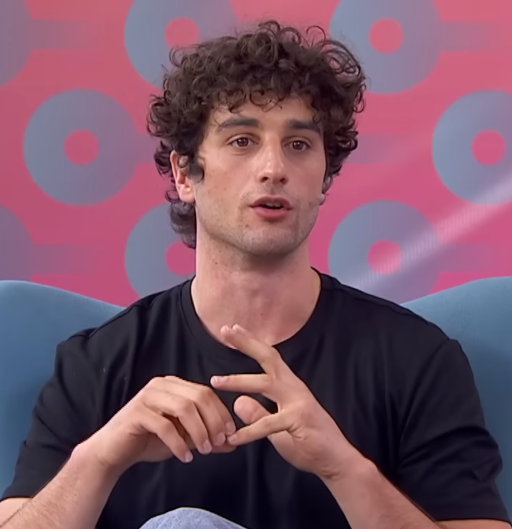
- Della Corte in 2024
- Full name: Agustín Bertoni Della Corte
- Born: 11 September 1997 (age 29) Paysandu, Uruguay
- Height: 1.78 m (5 ft 10 in)
- Weight: 92 kg (203 lb)

Rugby union career
- Position: Centre
- Current team: Peñarol
Senior career
Years	Team	Apps	(Points)
2020−	Peñarol	1	(0)
- Correct as of 5 October 2019
International career
Years	Team	Apps	(Points)
2017–present	Uruguay	8	(0)
- Correct as of 5 October 2019

Agustín Della Corte Bertoni (born 11 September 1997) is a Uruguayan former rugby union player and actor. He played as a centre representing Uruguay internationally and made his first World Cup appearance in 2019.

== Biography ==
=== Early life and education ===
Della Corte Bertoni was born in Paysandú in 1997. He is of Italian descent. He started playing rugby at an early age at the Trébol Rugby Club in his hometown.

In 2017 he enrolled at the University of Montevideo to study public accounting and business administration.

=== Playing career ===
He made his international debut for Uruguay against Emerging Italy on 10 June 2017, at the age of 19. He made his first Rugby World Cup appearance in 2019, during the tournament held in Japan, appearing in Uruguay's third match against Wales.

In 2020, he was signed by Peñarol Rugby. However, at the end of the year, he officially retired from rugby.

=== Acting career ===
In 2021, after a successful audition, he was cast as Antonio "Tintín" Vizintín in Society of the Snow, directed by J. A. Bayona. The film recounts the true story of Uruguayan Air Force Flight 571, which crashed in the Andes. Marking his acting debut, he underwent an intense physical transformation, losing 27 kilos to authentically portray the experience of the survivors.

In July 2024, it was announced that he had joined the cast of Olympo, a new Spanish Netflix series premiered in June 2025.

== Filmography ==
=== Film ===
Year	Title	Role
2023	Society of the Snow	Antonio "Tintín" Vizintín
2014	Linda	Blas
2025	Papers	Yago

=== Television ===
Year	Title	Role	Notes
2025	Olympo	Roque Pérez	Main role
