= Nerea Mazo =

Spanish actress (born 1998)

- Mazo in 2018
- Born: Nerea Mazo Antón; 1998 (age 27–28); Bilbao, Spain
- Education: University of the Basque Country
- Occupation: Actress
- Years active: 2011–present
- Father: Aitor Mazo

Nerea Mazo Antón (born 1998) is a Spanish actress.

== Biography ==
Mazo was born in Bilbao to Aitor Mazo and Beatriz Antón; her father, who was also an actor, died in 2015. She studied audiovisual communication at the University of the Basque Country.

== Filmography ==
=== Film ===
Year	Title	Role	Ref.
2013	15 Years and One Day	Nera	
2016	Igelak	Scrap collector's daughter	
2020	Hil Kanpaiak	Young Karmen	
2024	Who Is Who?	Ariadna	

=== Television ===
Year	Title	Role	Notes	Ref.
2011	Sabin	Young Paulina Arana	Television film	
2017–2020	Go!azen	Nikole	26 episodes	
2023	Muted	Woman on bicycle	1 episode	
2023	Itxaso	Itxaso	8 episodes	
2025	Olympo	Claudia Tur	3 episodes	
2025	Mar afuera	Álvaro's sister	2 episodes	
TBA	Lehen aldiz	TBA		
