= The Route (TV series) =

Spanish television series

- Spanish: La ruta
- Created by: Borja Soler; Roberto Martín Maiztegui
- Written by: Borja Soler; Roberto Martín Maiztegui; Clara Botas; Silvia Herreros de Tejada
- Directed by: Borja Soler; Belén Funes; Carlos Marqués-Marcet
- Starring: Àlex Monner; Claudia Salas; Ricardo Gómez; Elisabet Casanovas; Guillem Barbosa
- Country of origin: Spain
- No. of seasons: 2
- No. of episodes: 14

Production
- Executive producers: Montse García; Eduardo Villanueva; Nacho Lavilla
- Production companies: Atresmedia Televisión; Caballo Films

Original release
- Network: ATRESplayer Premium
- Release: 13 November 2022

The Route (Spanish: La ruta) is a Spanish television series created by Borja Soler and Roberto Martín Maiztegui for Atresplayer Premium which stars Àlex Monner, Claudia Salas, Ricardo Gómez, Elisabet Casanovas and Guillem Barbosa.

== Plot ==
Featuring the backdrop of the Ruta Destroy clubbing movement, the fiction, following a group of friends "intensely living" the aforementioned cultural scene, starts in 1993 (when the massified "route" was declining), going backwards in time down to 1981.

== Cast ==
- Àlex Monner as Marc Ribó
- Claudia Salas as Toni
- Ricardo Gómez as Sento
- Elisabet Casanovas as Nuria
- Guillem Barbosa as Lucas Ribó
- Sonia Almarcha
- Luis Bermejo
- Victoria Oler
- Josep Manel Casany
- Rosana Espinós
- Nao Albet
- Jorge Silvestre
- Héctor Juezas
- Manuel Canchal

== Production ==
Created by Borja Soler and Roberto Martín Maiztegui, La ruta is an Atresmedia Televisión and Caballo Films production. Consisting of 8 episodes, the series was directed by Borja Soler (episodes 1, 2, 3 and 8), Belén Funes (4 and 5) and Carlos Marqués-Marcet (6 and 7). Shooting began in late January 2022 in the Valencia region, and had already wrapped by late May 2022.

== Release ==
The series premiered on Atresplayer Premium on 13 November 2022.

== Accolades ==
Year	Award	Category	Nominee(s)	Result	Ref.
2023	10th Feroz Awards	Best Drama Series		Won	
2023	10th Feroz Awards	Best Actress in a TV Series	Claudia Salas	Won	
2023	10th Feroz Awards	Best Actor in a TV Series	Àlex Monner	Nominated	
2023	10th Feroz Awards	Best Supporting Actress in a TV Series	Elisabet Casanovas	Nominated	
2023	10th Feroz Awards	Best Supporting Actor in a TV Series	Ricardo Gómez	Nominated	
2023	10th Feroz Awards	Best Screenplay in a TV Series	Borja Soler, Roberto Martín Maiztegui, Clara Botas, Silvia Herreros de Tejada	Won	
2023	31st Actors and Actresses Union Awards	Best Television Actor in a Secondary Role	Ricardo Gómez	Nominated	
2023	70th Ondas Awards	Best Spanish Drama Series		Won	
2024	25th Iris Awards	Best Actor	Ricardo Gómez	Pending	
2024	25th Iris Awards	Best Fiction Cinematography	Diego Cabezas	Pending	
