= Through My Window (film) =

2022 film directed by Marçal Forés

- Official release poster
- Spanish: A través de mi ventana
- Directed by: Marçal Forés
- Screenplay by: Eduard Sola
- Based on: Through My Window by Ariana Godoy
- Produced by: Núria Valls; Adrián Guerra
- Starring: Julio Peña; Clara Galle; Pilar Castro
- Cinematography: Elías M. Félix
- Edited by: Verónica Callón
- Production company: Nostromo Pictures
- Distributed by: Netflix
- Release date: 4 February 2022
- Running time: 116 minutes
- Country: Spain
- Languages: Spanish; English; French

Through My Window (Spanish: A través de mi ventana) is a 2022 Spanish teen romantic drama film directed by Marçal Forés from a screenplay by Eduard Sola, based on the novel of the same name by Ariana Godoy. The film stars Julio Peña, Clara Galle and Pilar Castro. It was released on Netflix on 4 February 2022.

A sequel titled Through My Window: Across the Sea was released on 23 June 2023. The third and final installment, Through My Window 3: Looking at You, was released on 23 February 2024.

== Plot ==
Raquel starts narrating the story of her life. In a classroom we see her refusing to read her assignment even though she knows how to write a story, she isn't brave enough to tell it. She then says that her story doesn't start in this classroom, it actually starts in her house.

Her house, as she describes, is a humble abode that, through ups and downs, ended up surrounded by an empire called the Hidalgo mansion. The Hidalgos are her next door neighbors, but their lifestyle is completely different from hers. The Hidalgos own Alpha 3, one of the most influential companies in the country, whose headquarters is the most spectacular building in Barcelona.

Alpha 3 refers to the three heirs to the empire, the Hidalgo brothers, Artemis, Ares and Apolo. Raquel has an unhealthy obsession with Ares but has never said a word to him. She knows everything he does and likes to collect information about him.

Apolo thanks Raquel for letting them use her Wi-Fi as theirs is broken. She is confused and finds out that Ares has hacked into her computer and obtained the Wi-Fi password. The next day Raquel follows Ares into a secluded wooded area, where she confronts him about hacking into her computer. In response, he writes the password on her hand and asks her why it is a code that says, 'Ares, Greek God'. They exchange words which leads to Raquel admitting that she likes him and wants him to fall for her.

At night she unplugs the Wi-Fi to assert that she is the one in control of it, but Ares climbs up her window into her room and plugs it back in. They share a steamy moment that leaves Raquel wanting for more. The next day Ares invites her to a party where she seduces him but doesn't let him get what he wants and exclaims that karma is a bitch.

Later, she buys a drink for Apolo who gets too drunk and doesn't want to go back to his place. She takes him to her place with the help of her friend, Daniela. On the way to her place, Apolo accidentally breaks her phone. Ares again climbs up her window and says that until their father goes to work, they can't go back home. Ares opens up to her about his grandfather's death and how he also has allergies just like him. Ares gifts Raquel a new phone but she isn't very pleased with this gesture. So she goes to his house to return the phone but things get too steamy and they end up having sex. But after this, Ares acts indifferent which makes Raquel really angry and she storms off.

She realizes that she has left her locket at his place so she goes back to get it. She ends up staying the night but in the morning he again dismisses her and makes her leave. Raquel's friends, Daniela and Yoshi bring her to a party to help her take her mind off of Ares where she gets drunk. Ares sees her in the street in a vulnerable position and takes her to her house. Ares admits that he has been pushing her away as she makes him feel things and how his father has already set a path for him which he has to follow. A path that doesn't involve falling for any girl. Ares tells Raquel that he genuinely does care about her and asks her to give him another chance.

Everything seems to be going well this time. But that is until Ares takes Raquel to a family party to prove a point to his father. There, Raquel feels humiliated when she sees her mother working as a waiter.

Raquel has a heartfelt conversation with her mother where she is told not to follow in the footsteps of her father. Her father was a great writer but did not have the courage to publish his novel. She encourages her to cut all the drama and just tell Ares how she really feels about him.

Raquel goes to Ares's place to tell him just that but isn't allowed into the house as everyone in his family feels that she is a distraction that will stop him from attaining his goals. Ares disobeys everyone and runs to the prom where he is shunned by Yoshi for breaking Raquel's heart so many times.

Yoshi is furious and doesn't let Ares speak to Raquel. They exchange words that lead to a fight where Yoshi pushes Ares into a partially empty pool, spilling chlorine into as he turns away.

Raquel takes him to the hospital and stays by his side the whole time until he completely recovers. After the scare, Ares's family lets him do what he wants. So, he decided to study medicine in Stockholm.

At the airport, Ares confesses that he had purposefully broken their Wi-Fi so that he could talk to her.

Raquel is finally brave enough to tell her story, so four months later she publishes her book called 'Through My Window'.

The end credits roll as we see Ares climb up her window to surprise her.

== Cast ==
- Julio Peña as Ares Hidalgo
- Clara Galle as Raquel Mendoza
- Pilar Castro as Rosa María
- Hugo Arbues as Apolo Hidalgo
- Rachel Lascar as Sofía Hidalgo
- Eric Masip as Artemis Hidalgo
- Natalia Azahara as Daniela
- Guillermo Lasheras as Yoshua "Yoshi" García
- Marià Casals as Marco
- Lucía de la Puerta as Samy
- Emilia Lazo as Claudia

== Release ==
Through My Window was released on Netflix on 4 February 2022.

== Reception ==
On the review aggregator website Rotten Tomatoes, the film holds an approval rating of 0% based on six reviews. Janire Zurbano of Cinemanía rated the film with 2 out of 5 stars considering that it featured "sex, attempts of female empowerment and the same old toxic cliches".

== Sequels ==
In February 2022, Netflix announced the development of two sequels, later revealing the title of the first one to be Across the Sea (A través del mar), featuring Andrea Chaparro, Iván Lapadula and Carla Tous as cast additions.

Through My Window: Across the Sea was released on 23 June 2023. The third and final installment, Through My Window 3: Looking at You (A través de tu mirada), was released on 23 February 2024.

== See also ==
- List of Spanish films of 2022
