= Seddon (surname) =

Seddon is an English-language surname.

== People with the name ==
- Bill Seddon (1901–1993), English footballer
- Chris Seddon (born 1983), American Major League baseball pitcher
- Daniel Seddon (1761–1839), British Army officer
- Frederick Seddon (1870–1912), British murderer
- Gareth Seddon (born 1980), English footballer
- George Seddon (academic) (1927–2007), Australian academic
- George Seddon (cabinetmaker) (1727–1801), English cabinetmaker
- Herbert Seddon (1903–1977), British orthopaedic surgeon and nerve researcher
- Holly Seddon (born 1980), British author and journalist
- James Seddon (1815–1880), American lawyer and politician
- Jimmy Seddon (1895–1971), English footballer
- John Seddon, British occupational psychologist
- John Seddon (Unitarian) (1719–1769), English Unitarian minister
- John Seddon of Warrington (1725–1770), English dissenter minister
- John Pollard Seddon (1827–1906), English architect
- Ken Seddon (1950–2018), English chemist
- Margaret Seddon (1872–1968), American film actress
- Margaret Rhea Seddon (born 1947), American physician and NASA astronaut
- Mark Seddon (born 1962), British journalist
- Patsy Seddon, Scottish harpist
- Richard Seddon (1845–1906), the longest-serving prime minister of New Zealand
- Robert Seddon (1860–1888), England and British Lion rugby player
- Steve Seddon (born 1997), English footballer
- Thomas Seddon (1884–1972), New Zealand politician, Richard Seddon's son
- Thomas Seddon (1821–1856), English landscape painter

== Fictional characters ==
- Lewis Seddon, character in British TV series Waterloo Road
