= Seddon Conservation Park =

Protected area in South Australia

- IUCN category III (natural monument or feature)
- Location within South Australia
- Location: South Australia
- Nearest city: Parndana
- Coordinates: 35°50′00″S 137°16′25″E
- Area: 22 ha (54 acres)
- Established: 21 January 1971
- Governing body: Department for Environment and Water

Seddon Conservation Park is a protected area in South Australia located on Kangaroo Island. It was dedicated in 1971 to protect a representative sample of the lateritic plateau vegetation of the central part of the island.

== Description ==
The conservation park has an area of 23 ha (57 acres) and is located in the locality of Seddon about 5.5 km (3.4 mi) south of the town of Parndana and 40 km (25 mi) south-west of Kingscote. The Eleanor River flows through the conservation park. The vegetation is mainly a woodland association of Eucalyptus leucoxylon and E. fasciculosa, with open shrubland of E. cosmophylla and E. baxteri over Allocasuarina muelleriana, Xanthorrhoea tateana and Melaleuca uncinata. The conservation park is classified as an IUCN Category III protected area.

== See also ==
- Protected areas of South Australia
