= Alexandra Prokhorova =

Russian-Spanish actress, screenwriter, director and poet

- Born: Leningrad, Saint Petersburg
- Occupation: Actress
- Years active: 2014 - present
- Notable work: In From The Cold, Sicilia Sense Mort
- Height: 163 cm (5 ft 4 in)
- Website: https://alexandraprokhorova.com/

Alexandra Prokhorova is a Russian-Spanish actress, screenwriter, director and poet known for her participation in series such as Central Market, Sicilia Sense Morts, In from the Cold and Nacho. she also participated in laureate films such as 70 Binladens and cardboard clouds.

== Career ==
She was born in St. Petersburg and at age eight relocated to Spain with her family. From a young age, she showed artistic concerns and began taking acting classes at the Juan Carlos Coraza Theater school.

One of her first opportunities in the cinema was given by Koldo Serra in the movie 70 Binladens, then films such as Cardboard clouds followed.

One of her first roles on television was as a guest appearance in the TV series Servir y proteger and Cable Girls. She played the character, Gaia Morozova, a deadly henchwoman from the Netflix TV series In From the Cold.

She participated in several Theater plays, most recently Desmona in " Las Culpables" from Spanish author Carlos Be.

Currently, Alexandra produces the short film The Fish Boy and has a recurring role in Movistar plus production, Segunda Muerte

== Filmography ==
=== Movies ===
Título	Personaje	Director	Estreno
Latin Hitman	Sveta	Damian Chapa	2020
Nubes de Cartón	Diana	Sergio Hernández	2019
70 Binladens	Daryna	Koldo Sierra	2018
Alexa	Alexa	Leila García	2018
Que el fin del mundo te pille bailando	Dancer friend	Josemar Martínez	2018
Condena	Elena	Ainara Cano	2018
Mirame	-	Alexandra Prokhorova	2017
Sin Mañana	Laura	Javier Mena	2017
Luces	La Chica que viene de la luz	Vicen Lorenzo	2017
No Place Like Home	Alex	David Velduque	2017
Lobos y corderos	The Killer	Ángel Harry	2016
La Ruleta Rusa	kidnapped Girl	Jesús García Llorena	2016
Resaca	Girl	Gian Carlos Gutiérrez	2015

=== T.V. series ===
Título	Personaje	Nota	Estreno
Olympo	Svetlana		2025
Segunda Muerte	Irochka	Recurrente	Por anunciar
Nacho	Cicciolina	Episódico	2023
Sicilia Sense Morts	Liudmila	Principal	2022
Mood	Covid Assistante ( recurrente)	Recurrente	2022
In From The Cold	Gaia Morozova	Recurrente	2022
Mercado Central	Vanessa	6 episodios	2020
Valeria	Inquilina de Lola	1 episodio	2020
Servir y Proteger	Estefanía	1 episodio	2020
Cable Girls	Housekeaper	1 episodio	2020
Fugitiva	Nurse	1 episodio	2018
Las crónicas de la litrona	Chica Rusa	2 episodios	2017
Relatos Estrafalarios	La transeúnte		2017

=== Theater ===
Título	Personaje	Estreno	Director
Mujeres infieles	-	2023	Alejandro Colera
Las culpables	Desdémona	2022-2023	Carlos Be
La destina de la caminanta	-	2018	José Carlos Palacios
La finca de las farsas	-	2015	Mateo Nicolau
El análisis perfecto hecho por un Loro	-	2010	Manuel Morón

=== Musical Video ===
- Choco S Parano ( 2022)

=== Producer ===
- El Niño Pez (2023)
