= Papers (film) =

- Theatrical release poster
- Directed by: Arturo Montenegro
- Written by: Arturo Montenegro; Andrés Clemente; Andry J. Barrientos
- Produced by: Andry J. Barrientos; Enrique Fernández; Patricia González; Arturo Montenegro; Verónica Ortiz; Martín Almada Tomeo
- Starring: Megan Montaner; Carlos Bardem; Gustavo Bassani; Jaime Newbal; Antonio Dechent
- Cinematography: Aaron Bromley
- Edited by: Arturo Montenegro; Antonio Zapata
- Music by: Carla F. Benedicto
- Production companies: Q Films; El Sueño Eterno Pictures; Criatura Cine
- Distributed by: #ConUnPack (Spain)
- Release dates: April 10, 2025 (Panama); December 5, 2025 (Spain)
- Running time: 108 minutes
- Countries: Panama; Uruguay; Spain
- Languages: Spanish; Turkish; German; Mandarin

Papers (Spanish: Papeles) is a 2025 thriller drama film co-written, co-produced, co-edited and directed by Arturo Montenegro, based on the 2016 Panama Papers scandal leak document. An international co-production between Panama, Uruguay and Spain, the film stars Megan Montaner, with Carlos Bardem, Antonio Dechent, Gustavo Bassani, Jaime Newbal, Nick Romano, Agustín Della Corte and Verónica Ortiz.

== Synopsis ==
Caught in the global scandal of the Panama Papers, Ana Méndez, legal director of the law firm Shubbert & Fassano, faces an unprecedented media attack against the country and the firm where she works. Accused of money laundering, she is pursued by prosecutor Roberto Ramírez and Interpol, so Ana escapes to the jungle to avoid imprisonment. There, loneliness and the absence of her three children and her husband, Eric, cause irreparable damage.

== Cast ==
- Megan Montaner as Ana Méndez
- Carlos Bardem as Raúl Fassano
- Antonio Dechent as Jordi Shubbert
- Gustavo Bassani as Eric Velasco
- Jaime Newbal as Roberto Ramírez
- Nick Romano as Jorge Pretto
- Agustín Della Corte as Yago
- Verónica Ortiz as Yanina
- Henry Twohy as Jim Roland
- Leo Wiznitzer as Mike Guardia
- Gaby Gnazzo as Lucrecia Tejada
- Stella Lauri as Gina Mutis
- Andrea Pérez Meana as Lucía
- Alí Arrocha as Jaime Atencio
- Ana Sibauste as Elena
- Ana Alejandra Carrizo as Lawyer
- Carlos Alfredo Lopez as Taxist
- Andrés Clemente as IT manager
- Roberto Thomas-Díaz as Officer
- Paulette Thomas as Counselor
- Luis Franco Brantley as Judge
- Enitzabel Castrellon as Dula Parodi

== Production ==
Principal photography began on January 15, 2023, and wrapped in late March of the same year. Filming took place on location in Panama, Uruguay, and Spain.

== Release ==
It premiered on April 10, 2025, in Panamanian theaters. It is scheduled to be released theatrically in Spain by #ConUnPack on December 5, 2025.

== See also ==
- List of Spanish films of 2025
