= Kangaroo Island Football League =

Kangaroo Island Football League (KIFL)
- Sport: Australian rules football
- President: Andrew Heinrich
- No. of teams: 5 A Grade; Reserves; Colts
- Country: South Australia, Australia
- Most recent champion: Western Districts (17th premiership)
- Most titles: Parndana (18 premierships)
- Sponsors: Kangaroo Island SeaLink; Retravision; Aurora Ozone Hotel; Sports Centre Sports Wear

The Kangaroo Island Football League (KIFL) is an Australian rules football competition based on Kangaroo Island in South Australia, Australia. It is an affiliated member of the South Australian National Football League and is zoned to the South Adelaide Football Club.

== Clubs ==
=== Locations ===
Locations of the Kangaroo Island FL clubs

=== Current ===
| Club | Guernsey | Nickname | Home Ground | Est. | Seasons in KIFL | KIFL Senior Premierships | |
| Club | Guernsey | Nickname | Home Ground | Est. | Seasons in KIFL | Total | Years |
|---|---|---|---|---|---|---|---|
| Dudley United | | Eagles | Penneshaw Oval, Penneshaw | 1965 | 1965- | 11 | 1965, 1980, 1984, 1988, 2000, 2004, 2006, 2007, 2014, 2015, 2016 |
| Kingscote | | Hounds | Soldiers Memorial Park, Kingscote | 1908 | 1922, 1934, 1946- | 13 | 1946, 1947, 1948, 1951, 1952, 1966, 1969, 1974, 1975, 1992, 2002, 2018, 2023 |
| Parndana (Seddon 1947, Settlement 1948-49) | | Roosters | Parndana Town Oval, Parndana | 1948 | 1947-1949, 1952, 1956- | 18 | 1956, 1957, 1959, 1960, 1967, 1968, 1979, 1981, 1989, 1997, 1998, 1999, 2008, 2009, 2010, 2011, 2012, 2013 |
| Western Districts | | Saints | Western Districts Community and Sports Club, Gosse | 1970 | 1970- | 17 | 1976, 1977, 1978, 1990, 1991, 1993, 1994, 1995, 1996, 2001, 2003, 2017, 2019, 2022, 2024, 2025, 2026 |
| Wisanger | | Panthers | Panther Park, Bay of Shoals | 1911 | 1922, 1934, 1922, 1934, 1946-2000, 2002- | 16 | 1950, 1953, 1955, 1958, 1961, 1970, 1971, 1972, 1973, 1982, 1983, 1985, 1986, 1987, 2005, 2021 |

=== Former ===
| Club | Guernsey | Nickname | Home Ground | Est. | Seasons in KIFL | KIFL Senior Premierships | | Fate |
| Club | Guernsey | Nickname | Home Ground | Est. | Seasons in KIFL | Total | Years | Fate |
|---|---|---|---|---|---|---|---|---|
| Dudley (Penneshaw 1922) | | Ramblers, Magpies | Penneshaw Oval, Penneshaw | 1889 | 1934, 1947–1964 | 1 | 1954 | Merged with United to form Dudley United in 1965. |
| Hog Bay | | | Lincoln Green, Kangaroo Head | 1908 | 1922 | 0 | - | Folded after 1922 season |
| Muston | | | Kiowe Oval | 1914 | 1922 | 0 | - | Folded in 1926 |
| Nepean Bay (Kangaroo Island Colts 1953-57) | (1953–57)(1958–66) | Colts | Nepean Bay Oval, Nepean Bay | 1950 | 1950–1966 | 2 | 1963, 1964 | Disbanded in 1966 due to introduction of "B Grade" |
| United | | | American River Oval, American River | 1954 | 1954–1964 | 1 | 1962 | Merged with Dudley to form Dudley United in 1965. |

== History ==
=== Pre WWII (Late 1800s–1945) ===
Australian Football began on Kangaroo Island in the late 1800s, with the first organised competition beginning in 1908 with the formation of Kingscote and Dudley United clubs. Wisanger joined in 1910, thereafter several clubs came and went such as Muston.

=== Post WWII (1946–) ===
The Kangaroo Island Football League (KIFL) was formed in 1946 with founding clubs Kingscote and Wisanger. They were later joined by Parndana, American River and Nepean Bay. With the demise of the latter two clubs and Dudley United unable to field a team, Western Districts was formed in 1970. Dudley United was re-introduced in 1976, with the league maintaining that structure to the present day. The reserve competition was formed in 1966. Kingscote and Parndana school teams played football against each other prior to the formation of Senior Colts in 1967 as an U15s competition; 1976 saw it change to U16s, reverting back to U15s in 2002. The Junior Colts competition was formed in 1970, formerly called the minis; in 1976 it was changed to U13s and today it is the U12s. Mini League was played at half time of A Grade matches in the 1980s and '90s, before becoming Auskick in the 2000s and being played in the mornings.

== Notable past players ==
| Player | Club | Years active in KIFL | Notes |
|---|---|---|---|
| Brendon Lade | Western Districts, Wisanger | 1987-1992 | Following on from his father, Don, Lade played his early football at Wisanger. When Don was appointed coach of Western Districts in 1987, Brendon followed his dad & he played colts football for them from 1987-1989. Returning to Wisanger, Lade came back at the right time to play in the clubs 1990-91 colts premierships. He made his senior debut in 1992, but by this time South Adelaide had come calling. Lade played 11 games for Wisanger, before embarking on a career in the SANFL. Lade regularly appeared in the Seniors for South Adelaide, before he was recruited by Port Power for their inaugural squad for the AFL in 1997. Lade made his AFL debut with Port Adelaide in Round 1, 1997, in what was also Port Adelaide's debut AFL match. Lade played 234 games (182 goals) for Port Adelaide as a ruckman and forward, whilst also being part of Port Adelaide's 2004 AFL premiership side. Other career highlights include; 1997 AFL Rising Star nominee, All-Australian 2006 & 2007 and the John Cahill Medallist in 2006. Lade retired in 2008, appearing a couple more times for South Adelaide to finish on 58 games for the Panthers. After his AFL career, Lade has been an assistant coach at Richmond, Port Adelaide, Stkilda and is currently at the Western Bulldogs. |
| Bradley Crabb | Western Districts | 1995–2003 2022-2026 | After playing his junior career on Kangaroo Island, winning the Pharmacy medal as best player in colts and playing in Western Districts 2003 premiership, Crabb made his league debut for South Adelaide in 2007. Crabb was a regular in defence and became known as reliable and a great clubman, as proven by him winning best clubman in 2013 and 2018. Crabb was named club captain in 2015, 2016, and 2017 and he was named at Full back in "The Advertiser Team of the Year in 2015. Crabb retired in 2019 having played 215 league games, over 300 games in total for South Adelaide and he kicked a total of 6 goals. Brad returned to the island, playing with his junior club, Western Districts to finish his playing career. Crabb won the goal kicking for the A Grade in 2025 with 46 goals. He was a member of their 2022, 2024-2026 premierships & retired after the 2026 triumph with over 100 senior games for Western Districts in a great career. |
| David Stoeckel | Dudley United | 1981–1984 | After dominating in the 1984 grand final against Wisanger, David joined South Adelaide as a twenty year old key forward and went on to have an illustrious career from 1985–1997. David played 267 games and kicked 391 goals during this time, and was rewarded with life membership in 1994. Other awards included best team man in 1996, and David was also the club's leading goalkicker in 1987, 1989, 1990 and 1996. David captained South Adelaide in 1996 and 1997, and was recognised with induction into the SANFL hall of fame in 2015. |
| Roger Williams | Nepean Bay, Kingscote & Dudley United | 1960-1965 1967-1981 | Roger made his senior debut as a 12-year-old for Nepean Bay in 1960, and played for two seasons for them before moving to Adelaide for his schooling. During this time Roger played a handful of reserves games in 1964, and made his senior debut in 1965. He would go on to play 50 league and reserves games over the next three seasons, before being transferred to Glenelg mid 1967 where he played another 4 league games. Roger returned to the island in 1968, playing with Kingscote winning the Mail Medal in 1969, 1972, 1973, 1975, 1976 and 1977. He transferred to Dudley United as playing coach in 1978, and set the standard for his new team by winning the medal that year too. Roger credits his brother, John and his colts coach, Charlie Inglis, as his greatest influences in football. |
| Danny Jenkins | Parndana | 1969–1975, 1986–1997? | Jenkins joined SANFL club Norwood, having won the Kangaroo Island Football League's best and fairest award in 1974. He made his senior Redlegs debut, aged twenty-one, in 1976, and ended up winning the club's best first year player award. The twin highlights of his career were the victorious grand finals of 1982 against Glenelg, when he won the Jack Oatey Medal as best afield, and 1984 against Port Adelaide when he was in his only season as captain of the side. He also played in the victorious grand final of 1978 against Sturt. Between 1976 and 1985 he played a total of 198 senior SANFL games and represented South Australia 5 times. |
| Allan Howard | Parndana | 1966–1971, 1979–1986? | Allan Howard debuted for North Adelaide in 1971 and was a member that year of the Roosters' winning grand final combination against Port Adelaide. He lined up on a half back flank on that occasion, as he did in the following year's premiership decider against the same opposition. Howard also played in the 1973 grand final but despite being one of the best players on view could not prevent the Roosters succumbing to Glenelg by seven points. Early in his SANFL career Howard sometimes played as a ruck-rover but he blossomed after being shifted to a half back flank. Between 1971 and 1978 and in 1981 he played 144 senior games for North and booted three goals. Both prior to commencing with the Roosters and during the gap in his SANFL career Allan Howard played with distinction for the Parndana Football Club on Kangaroo Island where he won a couple of Mail Medals for competition best and fairest in 1980 and 1981. |
| Clayton Willson | Dudley United | 1999-2024 | Clayton Willson is the greatest goal kicker to ever represent the island. He retired from football in 2024 just shy of the 1000 goal mark, finishing with a total of 984 goals. At his peak, Clay was arguably the greatest player the island has ever seen winning the Mail Medal 6 times (including 3 times in a row from 2007–09) & the Ozone Medal a record 7 times. Clay represented the Island a number of times & was selected to represent the southern region 5 times throughout his career. He played in 7 premierships for Dudley United (2000, 2004, 2006–07, 2014–16). |

== Grade Structure ==
As of 2018 the KIFL hosts 5 grades of competition, which include two senior grades, A-Grade & Reserves, and 3 colts grades, U15's, U12's & AusKick (U12's and AusKick do not play for premiership points). Currently all clubs have one team in all levels of competition.

== Premierships ==
| Year | A Grade | Reserves | Colts | Venue |
|---|---|---|---|---|
| 2026 | Western Districts 9.10 (64) def. Kingscote 9.6 (60) | Wisanger 11.6 (72) def Western Districts 3.2 (20) | Parndana 14.12 (96) def. Dudley United 10.4 (64) | Parndana Oval |
| 2025 | Western Districts 21.10 (136) def. Wisanger 4.6 (30) | Dudley United 10.9 (69) def. Wisanger 10.2 (62) | Western Districts 7.8 (50) def. Parndana 5.6 (36) | Kingscote Oval |
| 2024 | Western Districts 24.18 (162) def. Wisanger 4.2 (26) | Western Districts 8.6 (54) def. Kingscote 8.4 (52) | Western Districts 14.8 (92) def. Kingscote 4.7 (31) | Penneshaw Oval |
| 2023 | Kingscote 11.13 (79) def. Western Districts 10.7 (67) | Kingscote 11.12 (78) def. Western Districts 7.8 (50) | Dudley United 7.15 (57) def. Western Districts 8.2 (50) | Wisanger Football Ground |
| 2022 | Western Districts 17.14 (116) def. Wisanger 3.6 (24) | Kingscote 8.5 (53) def. Western United 6.6 (42) | Kingscote 22.13 (145) def. Parndana 1.2 (8) | Gosse Oval |
| 2021 | Wisanger 12.13 (85) def. Western Districts 8.12 (60) | Kingscote 16.7 (103) def. Dudley United 9.5 (59) | Kingscote 13.15 (93) def. Western Districts 2.5 (17) | Parndana Oval |
| 2020 | A Grade and B Grade cancelled | due to COVID-19 | Dudley United 11.9 (75) def. Kingscote 10.3 (63) | Parndana Oval |
| 2019 | Western Districts 11.12 (78) def. Parndana 10.3 (63) | Kingscote 15.9 (99) def. Western Districts 3.5 (23) | Kingscote 13.6 (84) def. Dudley United 8.3 (51) | Kingscote Oval |
| 2018 | Kingscote 6.10 (46) def. Western Districts 6.7 (43) | Kingscote 11.5 (71) def. Western Districts 9.6 (60) | Kingscote 7.8 (50) def. Parndana 5.9 (39) | Penneshaw Oval |
| 2017 | Western Districts 17.12 (114) def. Dudley United 11.7 (73) | Western Districts 16.8 (104) def. Parndana 5.3 (33) | Wisanger 8.14 (62) def. Kingscote 4.9 (33) | Wisanger Football Ground |
| 2016 | Dudley United 11.9 (75) def. Kingscote 6.9 (45) | Kingscote 9.9 (63) def. Wisanger 3.4 (22) | Wisanger 15.5 (95) def. Dudley United 5.7 (37) | Gosse Oval |
| 2015 | Dudley United 15.20 (110) def. Western Districts 8.5 (53) | Western Districts 17.14 (116) def. Wisanger 4.2 (26) | Wisanger 13.7 (85) def. Kingscote 7.5 (47) | Parndana Oval |
| 2014 | Dudley United 9.9 (63) def. Parndana 5.4 (34) | Dudley United 12.14 (86) def. Western Districts 6.4 (40) | Kingscote 8.9 (57) def. Wisanger 7.4 (46) | Kingscote Football Oval |
| 2013 | Parndana 21.13 (139) def. Kingscote 15.10 (100) | Western Districts 11.4 (70) def. Parndana 4.4 (28) | Wisanger 17.14 (116) def. Kingscote 4.3 (27) | Penneshaw Oval |
| 2012 | Parndana 14.8 (92) def. Dudley United 7.13 (55) | Kingscote 8.6 (54) def. Parndana 4.8 (32) | Wisanger 10.8 (68) def. Dudley United 6.14 (50) | Wisanger Football Oval |
| 2011 | Parndana 9.9 (63) def Kingscote 8.8 (56) | Kingscote 9.10 (64) def. Western Districts 2.3 (15) | Wisanger 9.6 (60) def. Dudley United 6.5 (41) | |
| 2010 | Parndana 11.9 (75) def Kingscote 4.6 (30) | Parndana 9.4 (58) def Western Districts 5.7 (37) | Western Districts 14.10 (94) def Dudley United 4.3 (27) | |
| 2009 | Parndana 6.15 (51) def. Dudley United 4.7 (31) | Parndana 7.9 (51) def. Kingscote 5.3 (33) | Western Districts 9.15 (69) def. Parndana 4.5 (29) | |
| 2008 | Parndana 10.14 (74) def. Dudley United 9.7 (61) | Dudley United 9.7 (61) def. Kingscote 5.9 (39) | Kingscote 23.14 (152) def. Wisanger 4.4 (28) | |
| 2007 | Dudley United 24.8 (152) def. Kingscote 9.5 (59) | Dudley United 9.10 (64) def. Western Districts 2.6 (18) | Kingscote 23.14 (152) def. Wisanger 4.4 (28) | Wisanger Oval |
| 2006 | Dudley United 18.11 (119) def. Parndana 6.3 (39) | Parndana def. Dudley United | Kingscote 12.10 (82) def Dudley United 7.6 (48) | |
| 2005 | Wisanger 17.12 (114) def. Parndana 9.7 (61) | Dudley United def. Parndana | Kingscote 24.19 (163) def. Wisanger 2.0 (12) | Parndana |
| 2004 | Dudley United 17.9 (111) def. Wisanger 8.6 (54) | Dudley United def. Parndana | Kingscote def. Wisanger | |
| 2003 | Western Districts 13.10 (88) def. Kingscote 8.6 (54) | Dudley United def. Parndana | Kingscote 10.7 (67) def. Wisanger 3.4 (22) | Penneshaw Oval |
| 2002 | Kingscote 16.9 (105) def. Wisanger 15.8 (98) | Kingscote def. Parndana | Wisanger 11.7 (73) def. Kingscote 6.3 (39) | Wisanger Oval |
| 2001 | Western Districts 3.10 (28) def. Kingscote 1.6 (12) | Kingscote | Kingscote | Gosse Oval |
| 2000 | Dudley United 5.6 (36) def. Parndana 5.4 (34) | Parndana 8.2 (50) def Western Districts 6.8 (44) | Western Districts 2.7 (19) def Wisanger 2.1 (13) | Parndana Oval |
| 1999 | Parndana 13.12 (90) def Western Districts 6.5 (41) | Dudley United 8.10 (58) def. Western Districts 5.7 (37) | Parndana 18.16 (124) def. Kingscote 1.1 (7) | Kingscote Oval |
| 1998 | Parndana 14.11 (95) def. Dudley United 11.13 (79) | Dudley United | Wisanger | |
| 1997 | Parndana 8.6 (54) def. Western Districts 5.14 (44) | Western Districts 6.8 (44) def. Parndana 6.6 (42) | Wisanger | Wisanger Oval |
| 1996 | Western Districts 7.8 (50) def. Parndana 3.7 (25) | Western Districts 7.8 (50) def Parndana 3.7 (25) | Wisanger | Gosse oval |
| 1995 | Western Districts 16.16 (112) def. Dudley United 3.4 (22) | Western Districts 10.8 (68) def. Parndana 6.11 (47) | Parndana 16.8 (104) def. Western Districts 9.5 (59) | Parndana Oval |
| 1994 | Western Districts 17.17 (119) def. Dudley United 9.7 (61) | Western Districts 16.11 (107) def. Wisanger 9.4 (58) | Parndana | Kingscote Oval |
| 1993 | Western Districts 13.15 (93) def. Dudley United 8.5 (53) | Western Districts 12.12 (84) def. Dudley United 5.6 (36) | Parndana | Penneshaw Oval |
| 1992 | Kingscote 16.9 (105) def. Western Districts 15.8 (98) | Wisanger | Western Districts 6.6 (42) def. Parndana 3.3 (21) | |
| 1991 | Western Districts 17.11 (113) def. Kingscote 10.5 (65) | Kingscote 14.17 (101) def. Dudley United 7.10 (52) | Wisanger | |
| 1990 | Western Districts 13.10 (88) def. Wisanger 12.13 (85) | Western Districts 11.14 (80) def. Parndana 6.5 (41) | Wisanger | |
| 1989 | Parndana 17.12 (114) def. Wisanger 15.11 (101) | Parndana | Kingscote | |
| 1988 | Dudley United 16.16 (112) def. Parndana 16.7 (103) | Western Districts 9.11 (65) def Kingscote 7.7(49) | Kingscote 21.13 (139) def. Parndana 4.5 (29) | |
| 1987 | Wisanger 22.9 (141) def. Kingscote 11.15 (81) | Wisanger 11.11 (77) def. Kingscote 10.6 (66) | Parndana 22.11 (143) def. Kingscote 5.4 (34) | |
| 1986 | Wisanger 16.12 (108) def. Parndana 9.10 (64) | Parndana | Kingscote | |
| 1985 | Wisanger 19.14 (128) def. Dudley United 13.13 (91) | Parndana | Wisanger | |
| 1984 | Dudley United 30.17 (197) def. Wisanger 9.23 (77) | Wisanger | Parndana | |
| 1983 | Wisanger 9.12 (66) def. Parndana 10.4 (64) | Kingscote 15.12 (102) def. Wisanger 8.9 (57) | Wisanger 9.6 (60) def. Parndana 5.4 (34) | |
| 1982 | Wisanger 18.20 (108) def. Dudley United 12.9 (81) | Kingscote 8.13 (61) def Wisanger 8.7 (55) | Wisanger 16.13 (109) def. Parndana 5.4 (34) | |
| 1981 | Parndana 14.14 (98) def. Dudley United 7.12 (54) | Wisanger | Wisanger def. Parndana | |
| 1980 | Dudley United 9.10 (64) def. Parndana 8.14 (62) | Wisanger 7.9 (51) def. Kingscote 5.12 (42) | Dudley United 9.4 (58) def. Wisanger 3.1 (19) | |
| 1979 | Parndana 11.17 (83) def. Western Districts 8.14 (62) | Wisanger | Parndana def. Kingscote | |
| 1978 | Western Districts 13.12 (90) def Kingscote 7.10 (52) | Wisanger | Kingscote | |
| 1977 | Western Districts 12.13 (85) def. Parndana 11.9 (75) | Parndana def Wisanger | Kingscote | |
| 1976 | Western Districts 13.15 (93) def. Parndana 6.6 (42) | Dudley United 14.19 (103) def. Western Districts 5.4 (34) | Kingscote | Kingscote Oval |
| 1975 | Kingscote 15.18 (108) def. Wisanger 8.13 (61) | Dudley United 11.8 (74) def. Wisanger 8.4 (52) | Wisanger 13.13 (91) def. Kingscote 7.4 (46) | |
| 1974 | Kingscote 14.15 (99) def. Wisanger 9.14 (68) | Kingscote def. Wisanger | Kingscote def. Parndana | |
| 1973 | Wisanger 15.12 (102) def. Kingscote 10.18 (78) | Kingscote 9.8 (62) def Wisanger 8.7 (55) | Parndana 5.6 (36) drew Dudley United 5.6 (36) Parndana 9.7 61) def. Dudley United 4.4 (28) | |
| 1972 | Wisanger 17.14 (116) def. Kingscote 14.10 (94) | Parndana | Western Districts 6.4 (40) def. Parndana 5.3 (33) | |
| 1971 | Wisanger 8.13 (61) def. Kingscote 3.12 (30) | Parndana 14.12 (96) def. Wisanger 3.1 (19) | Western Districts 11.24 (90) def. Kingscote 2.6 (18) | |
| 1970 | Wisanger 15.17 (107) def. Kingscote 11.7 (73) | Dudley United def Parndana | Kingscote def Western Districts | |
| 1969 | Kingscote 7.12 (54) def. Wisanger 6.9 (45) | Parndana 4.10 (34) def. Wisanger 4.6 (30) | Parndana 5.2 (32) def. Kingscote 2.9 (21) | Kingscote Oval |
| 1968 | Parndana 16.15 (111) def. Wisanger 11.9 (75) | Wisanger 11.12 (78) def. Parndana 7.4 (46) | Parndana 6.10 (46) def. Wisanger 5.6 (36) | |
| 1967 | Parndana 27.14 (176) def. Dudley United 5.8 (38) | Parndana 9.9 (63) def. Wisanger 6.6 (42) | Wisanger 3.7 (25) def. Parndana 3.6 (24) | |
| 1966 | Kingscote 19.10 (124) def. Dudley United 15.11 (101) | Parndana 22.19 (151) def. Wisanger 5.9 (39) | Parndana (mixed) 4.8 (38) drew Kingscote 4.8 (38) Parndana received shield after winning more matches | |
| 1965 | Dudley United 12.15 (87) def. Nepean Bay 11.8 (74) | Kingscote | | |
| 1964 | Nepean Bay 10.6 (66) def. Parndana 8.6 (54) | | | |
| 1963 | Nepean Bay 11.10 (76) def. Parndana 8.10 (58) | | | |
| 1962 | United 14.11 (95) def. Kingscote 10.13 (73) | | | |
| 1961 | Wisanger 7.8 (50) def. Nepean Bay 3.15 (33) | | | |
| 1960 | Parndana 13.8 (86) def. Kingscote 12.11 (83) | | | |
| 1959 | Parndana 16.12 (108) def. Nepean Bay 11.19 (85) | | | |
| 1958 | Wisanger 11.13 (79) def. Nepean Bay 11.12 (78) | | | |
| 1957 | Parndana 9.10 (64) def. K.I Colts 7.17 (59) | | | |
| 1956 | Parndana 6.20 (56) def. Wisanger 7.5 (47) | | | |
| 1955 | Wisanger 8.16 (64) def. Dudley 4.15 (39) | | | |
| 1954 | Dudley 12.6 (77) def. Wisanger 9.8 (62) | | | |
| 1953 | Wisanger 8.14 (62) def. K.I Colts 8.9 (57) | | | |
| 1952 | Kingscote 9.13 (67) def. Wisanger 2.12 (24) | | | |
| 1951 | Kingscote def. Dudley | | | |
| 1950 | Wisanger 10.18 (78) def. Kingscote 9.8 (62) | | | |
| 1949 | Kingscote 14.12 (96) def. Wisanger 2.12 (24) | | | |
| 1948 | Kingscote 12.6 (78) def. Dudley 2.11 (23) | | | |
| 1947 | Kingscote 9.13 (67) def. Dudley 6.11 (47) | | | |
| 1946 | Kingscote 8.16 (64) def. Penneshaw 5.6 (36) | | | |

== Individual awards ==
=== KIFL Mail Medalists ===
The Mail Medal is awarded to the best and fairest footballer in the highest grade of competition in Kangaroo Island Football League. Sunday Mail newspaper presents the best and fairest footballer in each country league in South Australia with a medal.

| Year | Mail Medalist | Club | Votes | Runner-Up | Club | Votes |
|---|---|---|---|---|---|---|
| 2026 | Jordan Connell | Kingscote | 16 | Paul Green | Kingscote | 15 |
| 2025 | Ezra Foster | Wisanger | 20 | Dylan Lockett; Jack Packer | Western Districts Dudley United | 12 |
| 2024 | Sam Jonas | Western Districts | 15 | Keenan Jacobs | Dudley United | 14 |
| 2023 | Tate Barrett | Western Districts | 19 | Dusty Cross | Wisanger | 16 |
| 2022 | Liam Sampson | Wisanger | 21 | Tate Barrett | Western Districts | 18 |
| 2021 | Ed Colley | Dudley United | 9 | Liam Sampson | Wisanger | 8 |
| 2020 | Not Awarded | | | | | |
| 2019 | Josh Graham | Western Districts | 17 | Rory Lovering | Kingscote | 16 |
| 2018 | Rory Lovering | Kingscote | | | | |
| 2017 | Josh Graham | Western Districts | | Leroy Turner | | |
| 2016 | Zac Edwards | Kingscote | | | | |
| 2015 | Khyal Stead | Wisanger | | | | |
| 2014 | Declan Howard | Dudley United | | | | |
| 2013 | Zac Edwards | Kingscote | | Clayton Willson | Dudley United | |
| 2012 | Nathan Trethewey | Parndana | | Xavier Larcombe | Western Districts | |
| 2011 | Clay Willson | Dudley United | | | | |
| 2010 | Nathan Trethewey | Parndana | 20 | David Westbrook; Clay Willson | Parndana; Dudley United | 17 |
| 2009 | Clay Willson | Dudley United | 22 | Josh Graham | Western Districts | 19 |
| 2008 | Clay Willson | Dudley United | | | | |
| 2007 | Clay Willson | Dudley United | | | | |
| 2006 | Daniel Budarick | Kingscote | 22 | Heath Deer | Parndana | 17 |
| 2005 | Heath Deer | Parndana | 22 | Matthew Thomas | Wisanger | 21 |
| 2004 | Craig Turner; Rhett Willson | Wisanger; Dudley United | 19; 19 | Clayton Willson | Dudley United | 17 |
| 2003 | Clay Willson | Dudley United | 15 | Craig Boxer; Lachlan Lade | Wisanger; Wisanger | 12; 12 |
| 2002 | Scott Walden | Kingscote | 19 | Lachlan Lade | Wisanger | 16 |
| 2001 | Brodie Howard | Dudley United | 14 | Josh Wilhelm; Troy Darams | Western Districts; Kingscote | 11; 11 |
| 2000 | Damien Trethewey | Parndana | 22 | Nathan Trethewey | Parndana | 18 |
| 1999 | Damien Trethewey | Parndana | 18 | Ashley Ness | Parndana | 14 |
| 1998 | Bradley Rynne | Parndana | 29 | David Florance | Dudley United | 15 |
| 1997 | Jason Wheaton | Wisanger | 22 | Troy Hilder | Western Districts | 17 |
| 1996 | Troy Hilder | Western Districts | 15 | Damien Trethewey; Damian Willis | Parndana; Dudley United | 13; 13 |
| 1995 | David Florance | Dudley United | 17 | Trevor Weatherspoon; Troy Hilder | Western Districts; Western Districts | 14; 14 |
| 1994 | David Florance | Dudley United | 29 | Les Warner | Wisanger | 17 |
| 1993 | Brenton Lovering | Kingscote | 14 | David Florance | Dudley United | 12 |
| 1992 | David Florance | Dudley United | 31 | Brenton Lovering | Kingscote | 28 |
| 1991 | Darryl Warner | Wisanger | 18 | Brett Padroth | Kingscote | 17 |
| 1990 | Brenton Lovering | Wisanger | 23 | Paul Mitchell | Western Districts | 15 |
| 1989 | Peter Lovering | Kingscote | 25 | Andrew Rabbitt | Wisanger | 17 |
| 1988 | David Florance | Dudley United | 28 | Andrew Rabbitt | Wisanger | 21 |
| 1987 | Dean Montgomerie | Wisanger | 19 | Harold Lovergrove | Kingscote | 18 |
| 1986 | Andy Rabbitt | Wisanger | 29 | David Florance | Dudley United | 25 |
| 1985 | Peter Jones | Western Districts | 18 | David Florance | Dudley United | 16 |
| 1984 | David Florance | Dudley United | 23 | Allan Howard | Parndana | 18 |
| 1983 | Steven May | Parndana | 24 | Allan Howard | Parndana | 16 |
| 1982 | Daniel Lovering | Western Districts | 20 | Steven Lubcke | Kingscote | 18 |
| 1981 | Allan Howard | Parndana | 22 | Steven Lubcke | Kingscote | 16 |
| 1980 | Allan Howard | Parndana | 24 | Greg Roberts | Western Districts | 22 |
| 1979 | Colin Hopkins | Dudley United | 23 | Alan Howard | Parndana | 16 |
| 1978 | Roger Williams | Dudley United | 17 | Danny Lovering | Western Districts | 15 |
| 1977 | Roger Williams | Kingscote | 16 | Brian Murray | Kingscote | 10 |
| 1976 | Roger Williams | Kingscote | 15 | Greg Roberts & Danny Lovering | Western Districts | 13 |
| 1975 | Roger Williams & Greg Roberts | Kingscote & Western Districts | 15 | Daniel Jenkins | Parndana | 10 |
| 1974 | Daniel Jenkins | Parndana | 28 | Jim McLaren | Western Districts | 18 |
| 1973 | Roger Williams | Kingscote | 15 | Graham Smith & Jim Bowden | Parndana & Wisanger | 9 |
| 1972 | Roger Williams | Kingscote | 23 | Jim McLaren | Western Districts | 21 |
| 1971 | Donald Lade | Wisanger | 15 | Garry Lovering | Kingscote | 14 |
| 1970 | Trevor Bland | Wisanger | 21 | Wayne Conaghty & Mike Smith | Kingscote & Western Districts | 13 |
| 1969 | Roger Williams | Kingscote | 29 | Brian Fogarty | Wisanger | 12 |
| 1968 | Trevor Bland | Wisanger | 30 | Roger Williams | Kingscote | 25 |
| 1967 | Barry Stoeckel | Dudley United | 23 | Gerald Paxton | Parndana | 21 |
| 1966 | Warren Boxer | Wisanger | 25 | Gerald Paxton | Parndana | 21 |
| 1965 | John Obst | Parndana | 19 | Barry Boxall | Dudley United | 12 |
| 1964 | John Obst | Parndana | 20 | Roger Williams | Nepean Bay | 18 |
| 1963 | Garry Lovering | Nepean Bay | 26 | Deon Johnson | United | 12 |
| 1962 | John Lovering | Nepean Bay | 25 | G Neave | Dudley | 17 |
| 1961 | John Lovering | Nepean Bay | 19 | N Wood | Kingscote | 14 |
| 1960 | Malcolm Jones | Parndana | 25 | Peter Neave | Dudley | 19 |
| 1959 | John Lovering | Nepean Bay | | | | |
| 1958 | Dean Johnson | United | 22 | Malcolm Jones | 17 | Parndana |
| 1957 | Peter Neave | Dudley | | | | |
| 1956 | Peter Arbon | Kingscote | | | | |
| 1955 | Dean Bell | Wisanger | | | | |
| 1954 | Ian Gillfillan | Dudley | | | | |
| 1953 | Peter Thompson | Colts | | | | |
| 1952 | Peter Barratt | Wisanger | | | | |
| 1951 | Jim Anderson | Wisanger | | | | |

=== Johnston Medal ===
The Johnston Medal is awarded to the best and fairest footballer in the reserve grade of competition in Kangaroo Island Football League.

| Year | Medalist | Club |
|---|---|---|
| 2026 | Luke Stewart | Wisanger |
| 2025 | Alex McFarlane | Western Districts |
| 2024 | Andrew Arnold | Wisanger |
| 2023 | Travis Hilder | Western Districts |
| 2022 | Cain Florance | Kingscote |
| 2021 | Gage Shulver Cain Florance | Dudley United Kingscote |
| 2020 | Not Awarded | |
| 2019 | Michael Mills Alex Laver | Parndana Western Districts |
| 2018 | Rory Davis | Kingscote |
| 2017 | Josh Bennett | Parndana |
| 2016 | Michael Mills | Parndana |
| 2015 | Michael Mills | Parndana |
| 2014 | Damien Willmott Michael Hastings | Western Districts Dudley United |
| 2013 | Ben Davis | Western Districts |
| 2012 | Brenton Putland | Parndana |
| 2011 | Damien Florance | Western Districts |
| 2010 | Brenton Putland | Parndana |
| 2009 | Ashley Ness | Parndana |
| 2008 | Will Ducrou | Wisanger |
| 2007 | David Florance | Dudley United |
| 2006 | David Florance | Dudley United |
| 2005 | Dean Montgomerie | Dudley United |
| 2004 | Neil Stoeckel | Dudley United |
| 2003 | Greg Downing | Western Districts |
| 2002 | David Neave | Wisanger |
| 2001 | Craig Glynn | Wisanger |
| 2000 | Damien Perry | Dudley United |
| 1999 | Brett Haggett | Kingscote |
| 1998 | Matt Dezen | Dudley United |
| 1997 | Jo McDonald | Kingscote |
| 1996 | Ricky Spark | Dudley United |
| 1995 | Greg Hurst | Wisanger |
| 1994 | Quentin Anderson | Western Districts |
| 1993 | Brian Johnston | Parndana |
| 1992 | Brian Peckover | Wisanger |
| 1991 | David Jamieson | Dudley United |
| 1990 | Brian Johnston | Parndana |
| 1989 | Keith Hodder | Wisanger |
| 1988 | Phil Robinson | Kingscote |
| 1987 | Stephen Hart | Kingscote |
| 1986 | David Wilson | Parndana |
| 1985 | Colin Hopkins | Dudley United |
| 1984 | Bernie May | Parndana |
| 1983 | Jim Turner | Wisanger |
| 1982 | Steven Geci | Kingscote |
| 1981 | David Stoeckel | Dudley United |
| 1980 | Brian Hilder | Western Districts |
| 1979 | Graham Morris | Western Districts |
| 1978 | Gilbert Bates | Wisanger |

=== Pharmacy Medal ===
The Pharmacy Medal is awarded to the best and fairest footballer in the colts grade of competition in Kangaroo Island Football League.

| Year | Medalist | Club |
|---|---|---|
| 2026 | Caleb Bowden | Parndana |
| 2025 | Callan Fogden; Billy Brind | Western Districts |
| 2024 | James Mitchell | Kingscote |
| 2023 | Tait Florance | Dudley United |
| 2022 | Cain Florance | Kingscote |
| 2021 | Blake Florance | Kingscote |
| 2020 | Callum Willson | Dudley United |
| 2019 | Callum Willson | Dudley United |
| 2018 | Jayden Christophers | Kingscote |
| 2017 | Mahake Edwards | Parndana |
| 2016 | Damon Freitag | Wisanger |
| 2015 | Frank Colman | Kingscote |
| 2014 | Tate Lovering | Kingscote |
| 2013 | Dylan Lockett; Declan Hardy-Corby | Wisanger; Wisanger |
| 2012 | Sam Gurney | Dudley United |
| 2011 | Liam Sampson | Wisanger |
| 2010 | Damon Weatherspoon | Western Districts |
| 2009 | Hahns Sullivan | Parndana |
| 2008 | Sam Lewis | Wisanger |
| 2007 | Zac Edwards; Brent Kirby; Darcy Kildea | (Kingscote) (Dudley United) (Wisanger) |
| 2006 | Luke Bowd | Dudley United |
| 2005 | Ben Lock | Western Districts |
| 2004 | Michael Condo | Dudley United |
| 2003 | Paul Green | Kingscote |
| 2002 | Shane Matthews | Parndana |
| 2001 | Leroy Johnson | Kingscote |
| 2000 | Bradley Crabb | Western Districts |
| 1999 | Heath Deer | Parndana |
| 1998 | Ryan Francis | Parndana |
| 1997 | Ryan Burgess | Parndana |
| 1996 | Paul Jefferson | Wisanger |
| 1995 | Paul Jefferson | Wisanger |
| 1994 | Nathan Trethewey | Parndana |
| 1993 | Tim Johnson | Parndana |
| 1992 | Anton Remkes; Scott Redden | Western Districts |
| 1991 | Craig Turner | Wisanger |
| 1990 | Anton Lemon | Wisanger |
| 1989 | Brett Padroth | Kingscote |
| 1988 | Brett Padroth | Kingscote |
| 1987 | Troy Hilder | Parndana |
| 1986 | Jason Wheaton | Wisanger |
| 1985 | Brendan Lodge | Parndana |
| 1984 | Kim Blight | Kingscote |
| 1983 | Adam Lee | Kingscote |
| 1982 | Les Warner | Wisanger |
| 1981 | Anthony Boxer | Wisanger |
| 1980 | Nick Woolley | Wisanger |
| 1979 | Paul Sheridan | Kingscote |
| 1978 | David Florance | Dudley United |
| 1977 | Geof Johnson | Dudley United |
| 1976 | Colin Willson | Dudley United |
| 1975 | Tony Florance | Wisanger |
| 1974 | John Swanson | Dudley United |
| 1973 | James Chapman | Parndana |
| 1972 | Garry Buick | Dudley United |
| 1971 | Peter Byles | Western Districts |
| 1970 | Ian Griffith | Kingscote |
| 1969 | Daniel Jenkins | Parndana |
| 1968 | Mark Moffatt | Dudley United |
| 1967 | Chris Trethewey | Dudley United |
| 1966 | Peter Hargreaves | Combined Colts sides pre 1967 |
| 1965 | Russell Potter | |
| 1964 | Richard Trethewey | |
| 1963 | Danny Lovering | |
| 1962 | Don Lade | |

=== Season Leading goal kickers ===
Leading goal kickers in each grade at the end of the regular season.

| | A-Grade | | | B-Grade | | | | Senior Colts | | |
| Year | Player | Total | Club | Player | Total | Club | | Player | Total | Club |
|---|---|---|---|---|---|---|---|---|---|---|
| 2026 | Paul Green | 64 | Kingscote | Jed Florance | 25 | Wisanger | | Tate Stephenson | 34 | |
| 2025 | Bradley Crabb | 46 | Western Districts | Sam Henderson | 28 | Kingscote | | Callan Fogden | 108 | |
| 2024 | Lleyton Hedges | 52 | Western Districts | Sam Henderson | 35 | Kingscote | | Alby Hammat | 83 | Western Districts |
| 2023 | Lleyton Hedges | 62 | Western Districts | Sam Henderson | 30 | Kingscote | | Callan Fogden | 45 | Western Districts |
| 2022 | Sam Clifford | 44 | Wisanger | Scott Walden | 48 | Kingscote | | Cain Florance | 40 | Kingscote |
| 2021 | Kyron Pepper | 22 | Dudley United | Trae Lovering | 21 | Dudley United | | Blake Florance | 41 | Kingscote |
| 2020 | Not Awarded | | | | Not Awarded | | | Rory Florance | 33 | Dudley United |
| 2019 | Nathan Trethewey | 58 | Parndana | Corey Hammat | 51 | Western Districts | | Koby Cockshell | 103 | Kingscote |
| 2018 | Shaun Laffin | 57 | Wisanger | Sam Short | 68 | Western Districts | | Koby Cockshell | 51 | Kingscote |
| 2017 | Clay Willson | 67 | Dudley United | Jarrad Kelly | 24 | Parndana | | Luke Shurven | 37 | Wisanger |
| 2016 | Clay Willson | 65 | Dudley United | Matthew Geisler | 25 | Dudley United | | Luke Shurven | 35 | Wisanger |
| 2015 | Zac Trethewey | 33 | Parndana | Matthew Cooper | 53 | Parndana | | | | |
| 2014 | Clay Wilson | 65 | Dudley United | Daryl Weatherspoon | 28 | Western Districts | | Patrick Newman | 42 | Wisanger |
| 2013 | Riley Mattner | 36 | Kingscote | Robbie Barter | 61 | Parndana | | Tristan Griffith | 39 | Wisanger |
| 2012 | Grant Brown | 54 | Dudley United | Robbie Barter | 46 | Parndana | | Coby Helyar | 51 | Dudley United |
| 2011 | Angus Bruggemann | 51 | Parndana | Darryl Weatherspoon | 32 | Western Districts | | John Little | 59 | Wisanger |
| 2010 | Zach Trethewey | 59 | Parndana | Clayton Morrison | 36 | Kingscote | | Remar Anson | 61 | Kingscote |
| 2009 | Rick Morris | 39 | Western Districts | Daniel Dunstan | 30 | Parndana | | Jake Nolan | 80 | Western Districts |
| 2008 | Luke Ramsey | 52 | Kingscote | Chris Chirgwin | 30 | Kingscote | | Sam Lewis | 41 | Wisanger |
| 2007 | Rick Morris | 59 | Western Districts | Neil Stoeckel | 36 | Dudley United | | | | |
| 2006 | Clay Willson | 80 | Dudley United | | | | | | | |
| 2005 | Neville Clark | 59 | Wisanger | | | | | | | |
| 2004 | Clay Willson | 54 | Dudley United | Caleb Pratt | Parndana | | | | | |
| 2003 | David FLorance | 29 | Dudley United | | | | | | | |
| 2002 | Damien Bates | 35 | Wisanger | | | | | | | |
| 2001 | Daniel Taylor | 44 | Kingscote | | | | | | | |
| 2000 | Brad Barns | 44 | Western Districts | Darren Spark | 50 | Dudley United | | Raymond Campbell | 51 | Western Districts |
| 1999 | Brad Barns | 96 | Western Districts | Darren Spark | 63 | Dudley United | | Jon Demertzis | 63 | Parndana |
| 1998 | Alan Willson | 53 | Dudley United | | | | | | | |
| 1997 | Bradley Barns | 64 | Western Districts | | | | | | | |
| 1996 | Bradley Barns | 76 | Western Districts | | | | | | | |
| 1995 | Bradley Barns | 76 | Western Districts | | | | | | | |
| 1994 | Bradley Barns | 60 | Western Districts | | | | | | | |
| 1993 | Alan Willson | 50 | Dudley United | | | | | | | |
| 1992 | Bevan Golding | 33 | Kingscote | | | | | | | |
| 1991 | Michael Starr | 41 | Western Districts | | | | | | | |
| 1990 | Jamie Nadebaum | 48 | Western Districts | P.Brooksby | 29 | Parndana | | Matt Geisler | 46 | Wisanger |
| 1989 | Alan Willson | 50 | Dudley United | | | | | | | |
| 1988 | B.Golding | 51 | Kingscote | D. Lierich | 27 | Dudley United | | Brett Padroth | 56 | Kingscote |
| 1987 | David Neave | 81 | Wisanger | Gilbert Bates | 42 | Wisanger | | Troy Hilder | 91 | Parndana |
| 1986 | David Neave | 83 | Wisanger | Stephen Davidson | 69 | Wisanger | | R. Rose | 103 | Kingscote |
| 1985 | David Neave | 91 | Wisanger | Gary West | 46 | Parndana | | Geoff Bowden | 53 | |
| 1984 | P.McInnes | 88 | Parndana | Terry May | 31 | Parndana | | Garry Wallis | 66 | Parndana |
| 1983 | K.Hill | 46 | Western Districts | R.Northcott | 34 | Kingscote | | Daniel Bowden | 36 | Parndana |
| 1982 | David Florance | 55 | Dudley United | K.Howard | 26 | Dudley United | | L.Warner | 50 | Wisanger |
| 1981 | David Florance | 54 | Dudley United | | | | C Bell | 81 | Wisanger | |
| 1980 | Rodney Jenkins | 57 | Parndana | | | | | | | |
| 1979 | Peter Clark | 40 | Dudley United | | | | | | | |
| 1978 | Ian Griffith | 36 | Western Districts | | | | | | | |
| 1977 | Ian Griffith | 29 | Western Districts | | | | | | | |
| 1976 | Neville Davies | 39 | Parndana | | | | | | | |
| 1975 | Steve Riley | 42 | Kingscote | Geoff Buick | 31 | Dudley United | | Tony Florance | 73 | Wisanger |
| 1974 | Ron Clark | 50 | Kingscote | | | | | | | |
| 1973 | G.Thompson | 30 | Kingscote | Geoff Buick | 25 | Wisanger | | Small| 43 || Dudley United | | |
| 1972 | Brian Murray | 56 | Kingscote | | | | | | | |
| 1971 | Wayne Conaghty | 57 | Kingscote | | | | | | | |
| 1969 | Rob Chaplain | 62 | Wisanger | | | | | | | |
| 1968 | Rob Chaplain | 57 | Wisanger | | | | | | | |
| 1967 | Alan Howard | 67 | Parndana | | | | | | | |
| 1966 | Barry Morton | 39 | Kingscote | | | | | | | |
| 1965 | | | | | | | | | | |
| 1964 | B Morton | 39 | Nepean Bay | | | | | | | |
| 1963 | Dean Bell | 41 | Wisanger | | | | | | | |
| 1962 | Robert Harris | 42 | United | | | | | | | |
| 1961 | Gil Willson | 39 | Kingscote | | | | | | | |
| 1955 | Vern Trethewey | 46 | Dudley | | | | | | | |
| 1954 | Vern Trethewey | 92 | Dudley | | | | | | | |
| 1950 | Arthur Helyar | 36 | Kingscote | | | | | | | |
| 1948 | Vin Conaghty | 58 | Kingscote | | | | | | | |
| 1947 | Arthur Helyar | 35 | Kingscote | | | | | | | |

== League records ==
=== Most premierships, grand final appearances & Grand Final Records ===
| | A-Grade | | Reserves | From 2011: | | Colts | From 1999: | |
| Premiership Total | Club | Grand final appearances | Club | Grand final appearances | Premiership total | Club | Premiership total | Grand final appearances |
|---|---|---|---|---|---|---|---|---|
| 17 | Parndana | 32 | Dudley United | 5 | 2 | Kingscote | 11 | 18 |
| 16 | Wisanger | 37 | Western Districts | 11 | 3 | Wisanger | 7 | 14 |
| 12 | Kingscote | 33 | Kingscote | 9 | 8 | Dudley United | 2 | 5 |
| 15 | Western Districts | 23 | Parndana | 2 | 0 | Parndana | 2 | 5 |
| 9 | Dudley United | 23 | Wisanger | 4 | 1 | Western Districts | 5 | 7 |
| 2 | Nepean Bay | 8 | | | | | | |
| 1 | United* | 1 | | | | | | |
| 1 | Dudley* | 4 | | | | | | |

- United merged with Dudley in 1965 to become Dudley United.

Highest scores in a Grand Final:

- Kingscote- 19.10 (124) 1949 vs Dudley
- Wisanger- 22. 9 (141) 1987 vs Kingscote
- Dudley United- 30.17 (197) 1984 vs Wisanger
- Parndana- 27.14 (176) 1967 vs Dudley United
- Western Districts- 24.18 (162) 2024 vs Wisanger
- United- 14.11 (95) 1962 vs Wisanger
- Nepean Bay- 11.19 (85) 1959 vs Parndana
- Dudley- 12.6 (77) 1954 vs Wisanger

Biggest Winning margin in a Grand Final:

- Kingscote- 72 vs Dudley 1949
- Wisanger- 60 vs Kingscote 1987
- Dudley United- 120 vs Wisanger 1984
- Parndana- 138 vs Dudley United 1967
- Western Districts- 136 vs Wisanger 2024
- United- 22 vs Kingscote 1962
- Nepean Bay- 18 vs Parndana 1964
- Dudley- 15 vs Wisanger 1954

=== Individual records ===
- Most Mail medal wins: Roger Williams (Kingscote / Dudley United), 7, David Florance (Dudley United), 5, Clayton Willson (Dudley United), 5
- Most Mail medal runner-up's: David Florance (Dudley United), 4
- Most Johnston medal wins: Michael Mills (Parndana), 3
- Most Pharmacy medal wins: Brett Padroth (Kingscote), 2 Paul Jefferson (Wisanger), 2 Callum Willson (Dudley United), 2
- Most Ozone medal wins: David Florance (Dudley United), 7 Clayton Willson (Dudley United), 7
- Most goals in a game (A-Grade): Dudley United- Clayton Willson- 11 Kingscote- Paul Green-12, Parndana- Sam McInnes-, Western Districts- Bradley Barns-16, Wisanger- Robin Chaplain- 21
- Most goals in a season (A-Grade): Bradley Barns (Western Districts), 96 in 1999
- Most goals in a season (Reserves): Sam Short (Western Districts), 68 in 2018
- Most goals in a season (Colts): Callan Fogden (Western Districts), 108 in 2025
- Most games (club): Kingscote: Paul Green (333), Wisanger: David Neave (543), Dudley United: David Florance (448), Parndana: Steven May (498), Western Districts: Darryl Weatherspoon (387)
- Most goals (club) Kingscote: Gil Willson, Wisanger: David Neave (548), Dudley United: Clayton Willson (978), Parndana: Zac Trethewey (410*), Western Districts: Bradley Barns (502)

Nepean Bay: Barry Morton (89) Dudley: Vern Trethewey (184)

=== Club individual records ===
- Club with most Mail medal wins: Dudley United 16, Wisanger 15, Kingscote 14, Parndana 13, Western Districts 8, Nepean Bay 5, Dudley 2, United 1
- Club with most Mail medal runner-up's:
- Club with most Johnston medal wins: Dudley United 15, Parndana 13, Wisanger 12, Kingscote 10, Western Districts 7
- Club with most Pharmacy medal wins: Wisanger 15, Dudley United 14, Kingscote 14, Dudley United 12, Western Districts 7
- Club with most Ozone medal wins: Dudley United 17, Wisanger 17, Kingscote 12, Parndana 9, Western Districts 5
- Dudley United most Mail medal wins: Clayton Willson, 6
- Kingscote most Mail medal wins: Roger Williams, 6
- Parndana most Mail medal wins: John Obst, Allan Howard, Damien Trethewey, Nathan Trethewey, 2
- Western Districts most Mail medal wins: Josh Graham, 2
- Wisanger most Mail medal wins: Trevor Bland, 2
- Nepean Bay most Mail medal wins: John Lovering, 3

== Representative football ==
Kangaroo Island qualified in the B division for the 1970 Caltex Country Championship and were successful, defeating the Woomera, Southern and Murraylands Leagues. In 1988 Kangaroo Island combined with Great Southern to play a match against Tatiara in the opening round of the Escort Cup, losing by three points. Association matches were played spasmodically against Southern Yorke Peninsula and Yorke Valley. The KIFL was involved with the Mortlock Shield which takes place amongst several amateur country teams in Port Lincoln annually competing from 1990–1996 and from 2010–2016, the highest placing being fourth out of six teams. From 1992–1998 KIFL played an annual match against the Great Southern under 23 team, the Great Southern side leading the head-to-head 5–2. In 1999, KIFL took on a full strength Great Southern side, losing by 99 points. From 2000–2009 association matches were played spasmodically against Hills Country, Riverland and Southern leagues. Since 2017 matches have been played against Southern under 23's or under 21's, KIFL losing the first match, winning the second and in 2019 a draw. Since 2015, the best of the KIFL Under 17's have played against the Southern Under 15's, Southern leading the head to head 8-3 with the seniors head to head also in favour of Southern 7-1. (Home side named first in table below)

| Under 15's results (since 2015) | A Grade results (since 2017) |
|---|---|
| 2015- Southern 11.18 (84) def. K.I 1.2 (8) | |
2016 – K.I 4.4 (28) def by Southern 4.9 (33)
| 2017- K.I 2.3 (15) def by Southern 26.19 (175) | K.I- 7.18 (60) def. by Southern- 10.7 (67) |
| 2018- K.I 5.2 (32) def. by Southern 11.8 (74) | K.I 8.12 (60) def. Southern 8.9 (57) |
| 2019- Southern 9.6 (60) def. K.I 2.4 (16) | Southern 11.6 (72) drew K.I 11.6 (72) |
| 2021- Southern 12.6 (78) def. K.I 5.12 (42) | Southern 11.12 (78) def. K.I 9.3 (57) |
| 2022- K.I 11.13 (79) def. Southern 5.9 (39) | K.I 9.14 (68) def. by Southern 10.12 (72) |
| 2023- K.I 5.8 (38) def. by Southern 7.8 (50) | K. I 8.3 (51) def. by Southern 18.20 (128) |
| 2024- Southern 14.11 (95) def. K.I 0.3 (3) | Southern 13.11 (89) def. K.I 1.6 (12) |
| 2025- K.I 13.5 (83) def. Southern 5.7 (37) | K.I 6.3 (39) def. by Southern 24.16 (160) |
| 2026- Southern 3.5 (23) def by K.I 5.7 | Southern 10.9 (69) def. K.I 6.9 (45) |

== Books ==
- Encyclopedia of South Australian country football clubs / compiled by Peter Lines. ISBN 9780980447293
- South Australian country football digest volumes 1 and 2/ by Peter Lines ISBN 9780987159199
