= Olympo =

Spanish teen drama television series

- Genre: Teen drama; Sports drama; Mystery
- Created by: Jan Matheu; Laia Fogue; Ibai Abad
- Starring: Clara Galle; Nira Osahia; Agustín Della Corte; Nuno Gallego; María Romanillos; Andy Duato; Najwa Khliwa; Juan Perales; Martí Cordero; Jesús Rubio; Melina Matthews
- Composer: Pablo Borghi
- Country of origin: Spain
- Original language: Spanish
- No. of seasons: 1
- No. of episodes: 8

Production
- Executive producers: Ruben Goldfarb; Xavier Toll
- Producer: Antonio Asensio
- Cinematography: Carlos Garcés; Miquel Prohens
- Editors: Irene Blecua; Ascen Marchena
- Camera setup: Single-camera
- Running time: 42–53 minutes
- Production company: Zeta Producciones

Original release
- Network: Netflix
- Release: 20 June 2025

Olympo is a Spanish drama series created and written by Jan Matheu, Laia Foguet, and Ibai Abad for Netflix. The show is set at the Pirineos Center of High Performance, a fictional elite training school which hosts the most promising young athletes in the country, and focuses on their interpersonal relationships as they compete to win prestigious and lucrative sponsorship deals with global fashion brand Olympo and strive to prove themselves as the best in their chosen sports. The series premiered on 20 June 2025. In December 2025, Netflix confirmed that the series was not renewed for a second season.

== Cast and characters ==
=== Main ===
- Clara Galle as Amaia Olaberria, an accomplished and competitive artistic swimmer
- Nira Osahia as Zoe Moral, a heptathlete and newcomer to the HPC who is hiding a secret
- Agustín Della Corte as Roque Pérez, a gay rugby player
- Nuno Gallego as Cristian Delallave, Amaia's boyfriend and a member of the rugby team
- María Romanillos as Núria Bórges, former best friend, duet partner, and later rival of Amaia
- Andy Duato as Renata Aguilera, a heptathlete
- Najwa Khliwa as Fátima Amazian, a member of the artistic swimming team
- Juan Perales as Sebas Sendón, a confrontational member of the rugby team
- Martí Cordero as Charlie Lago, a rugby player and Sebas' best friend
- Jesús Rubio as Iker Delallave, a scout working for Olympo and Cristian's successful older brother
- Melina Matthews as Jana Castro, a scout working for Olympo and a former Olympic medalist who trained at the HPC
- Nicolás Furtado as Hugo Teixeira, a scout working for Olympo and a former professional football player

=== Recurring ===
- Vicenta Ndongo as Isabel Durán, the director of Pirineos Center of High Performance
- Alexandra Prokhorova as Svetlana Rominova, coach of the artistic swimming team
- Mario de la Rosa as Javier Montes, coach of the rugby team
- Juan López-Tagle as Jacobo Fuentes, coach of the heptathlon team
- Chos as Pepa Gracia, a physiotherapist at the HPC
- Mara Lãzaro as Yaiza Compés, Zoe's best friend
- Gleb Abrosimov as Diego Sorokov, a swimmer at the HPC
- Alberto Ávila as Miqui, a member of the heptathlon team
- Laura Moray as Jennifer Pina, a cyclist at the HPC with a connection to Zoe
- Laura Ubach as Peque, a member of the artistic swimming team
- Nerea Mazo as Claudia Tur, a cyclist at the HPC and Jennifer's friend
- Ismael Fritschi as Gunter Bronstein, owner of a cabin near the HPC where the athletes go to party
- Fanny Gautier as Yolanda Medina, chief of the Spanish Anti-Doping Agency

== Production ==
Filming for the series officially began on 23 July 2024, alongside the announcement of the main cast. The first trailer for the series was released on 29 April 2025.

== Episodes ==
=== Season 1 (2025) ===
No. overall	Title	Directed by	Written by	Original release date
1	"This is Not Olympic Level" (Esto no es nivel olímpico)	Marçal Forés	Jan Matheu	June 20, 2025
Zoe is scouted to attend the Pirineos Center of High Performance, and reluctantly agrees to join their heptathlon team. She meets Núria, an artistic swimmer recovering from a shoulder injury, who gives her a tour of the facility and introduces her to her best friend and duet partner Amaia, and their wider friend group. Representatives from global fashion brand Olympo arrive at the HPC to award lucrative scholarships to some of the athletes. Zoe struggles to adjust to her new environment and is teamed up with Renata, who doesn't acknowledge or talk to her at all. Amaia's mother, a failed former athlete, advises her to cut Núria loose because she is holding her back, and alleges that she lied about being injured to go on vacation. Núria refuses to tell Amaia the truth, and Amaia begins auditioning some of the other swimmers to replace her. At rugby training, Cristian almost gets injured and is informed by the coach that his performance is subpar and that he must leave the HPC. Hugo, one of the reps, secretly meets with Núria, who warns that Amaia might be onto them. Zoe is granted one of the Olympo sponsorships, earning ther ire of the other athletes. Roque secretly hooks up with swimmer Diego, who doesn't want to make their relationship public. Amaia discovers that Peque has been doping, but agrees not to tell the coach. After Roque vents to Christian about his frustration regarding Diego, Cristian posts a photo of Roque and Diego together. Zoe tries to leave the HPC, but is convinced to remain by Hugo. Núria finds out about Amaia trying to replace her, and outperforms Amaia in front of the others. She then falls unconscious, and Zoe and Amaia jump into the pool to rescue her.
2	"Cry or Win" (Llorar o ganar)	Marçal Forés	Laia Foguet	June 20, 2025
Núria is taken to the infirmary and Amaia tells the doctors to test for drugs in her system. Roque receives hate comments from the photo with Diego, who punches him in the face. He is also demoted from rugby captain in favour of Charlie, but the coach refuses to tell him why. Cristian tells Amaia he is leaving, and she criticizes him for not putting enough effort into his training and for how this will affect her image. Zoe fakes an ankle injury to avoid training, and confronts Amaia for pushing Núria too hard. She later leaves the HPC and is followed by Renata who warns Zoe that her attitude could result in her losing her sponsorship and being expelled. Zoe reveals that she must remain at the HPC to avoid potentially having to go to jail. Amaia is shocked to see Núria unconscious, with Hugo holding her hands. Cristian's brother Iker collects him from the HPC and chastises him for being weak. Roque overhears Jennifer trying to convince Claudia to take drugs. Following an intense sparring round, he confesses to Amaia that he thinks Sebas might be gay. At a party, Amaia calls Zoe a fraud and she, in return, accuses Amaia of being responsible for Núria's condition. Sebas tries to have sex with Zoe, but is unable to get aroused, and she assures him that it is okay. Renata takes a video of the medical team taking Núria away via helicopter.
3	"Not Again" (Otra vez no)	Daniel Barone	Laia Foguet	June 20, 2025
The rugby team travel to play a series of qualifying matches in Turin, where Roque continues to experience abuse and remains out of the starting line-up. When he is substituted in and helps win the match and speaks about homophobia in rugby to the media. Later he and Sebas have sex. Zoe and Jennifer have sex, and Zoe tells her how out of place she feels at HPC following the death of her friend Yaiza in the car accident. She confesses feeling exhausted all the time and Jennifer tells her that she has a cure for that. Zoe's coach tells her that Renata has to stop competing but does not give further details. Amaia tries to find out where Núria has been taken, but Isabel announces that she has been taken home and that her accident was a result of low blood sugar. Núria’s mother evades Amaia’s request to speak to her. Amaia threatens Peque, Claudia, and Jennifer, who all deny giving any drugs to Núria. She brings her concerns to Isabel who sides step the situation. Renata shows Amaia the video she took the previous night. Later she follows Jennifer and Zoe to Gunter's cabin and sees him giving them vials of steroids. She calls the Anti-Doping Agency to make a report.
4	"You'd Better Stop Here" (Es mejor que te detengas aquí)	Daniel Barone	Jan Matheu	June 20, 2025
Cristian returns stating that he has been allowed back onto the team after intensive training with Iker. He and Amaia agree to rekindle their relationship, though Fatima continues to flirt with him. The Anti-Doping Agency arrive to collect samples from the athletes, and Jennifer tells everyone that Amaia is responsible for calling them before she is expelled from the HPC after testing positive. Many of the other samples come back positive for doping, but one of the HPC doctors confesses that she was responsible for calling the ADA. Isabel flees to avoid being prosecuted. Roque and Amaia suspect that Cristian has used drugs to improve his strength in such a short timeframe, but he is defensive and tests negative, much to his own surprise. Amaia refuses to apologize and he breaks up with her. Roque is awarded the second Olympo sponsorship. Zoe flees to avoid being tested but is eventually apprehended and the results only find THC within permitted levels. The ADA find drugs in Amaia’s locker and tell her that, despite Isabel giving them a fake address, they found out Núria in Andorra. Amaia shares her belief that Isabel covered up what happened to Núria, but the ADA disregard this and disqualify her from competing.
5	"Nothing Can Be Said to You" (A ti no se te puede decir nada)	Ibai Abad	Laia Foguet and Jan Matheu	June 20, 2025
Isabel is arrested and Jana, one of the Olympo scouts, becomes the new director of the HPC and imposes a new edict of zero tolerance, installing security cameras and an athlete curfew. Amaia alleges that Olympo gave Roque the sponsorship because he’s gay. Jana has a documentary team follow the rugby team’s journey to the World Cup, where the team deny any homophobia and grow jealous of the focus on Roque. At a secret party, Cristian tells Fatima that he was awarded the final Olympo scholarship. Sebas speaks to Zoe, who advises him that hiding his sexuality will only cause him pain, and he later reconciles with Roque. Renata gets drunk and reveals to Zoe that she is intersex and can no longer compete due to the impact that the treatment to remove the testosterone from her system has on her body. Amaia finds a key to Núria’s drawer, finding that she was going to be sponsored by Olympo. In exchange for the ADA lifting the sanctions against her, she informs Jana where the party is being held and the Police locate the drug dealer responsible for the doping epidemic at the HPC. Amaia later sees Cristian having sex with Fatima. Zoe hallucinates Yaiza while training and collapses, causing Jana to call her a fraud and insists she quit the heptathlon team. Roque’s hand is broken by Charlie during training and he’s told he can’t play in the World Cup or he will risk becoming permanently disabled.
6	"You've Always Been My Favorite" (Siempre has sido mi favorita)	Ibai Abad	Alba Lucío	June 20, 2025
Zoe, Cristian, and Roque are taken to Olympo headquarters in Andorra, where they are showcased to the media as the next generation of elite sports stars. Amaia has Charlie follow them, and poses as Núria in order to gain access to the building. After a confrontation with Cristian and failed attempts to locate Núria, who she believes is being held in the facility; she is escorted out by security. Jana continues to insist that Zoe is not “Olympo material”, and Hugo informs Zoe that he protected her from being caught doping by the ADA and that she needs to take her sponsorship seriously. Iker upstages Cristian during a photoshoot and interview. Hugo tells Roque they can fix his hand and allow him to play in the World Cup. The Olympo medical team give Zoe a bone marrow puncture against her will and, while trying to escape, she finds Núria being kept there, but is forced to run before they can speak. Hugo offers Amaia a sponsorship deal and she accepts. When the group return to the HPC, Amaia sees Núria training in the pool.
7	"They Are Called Tactics" (Se llaman tácticas)	Ana Vázquez	Jan Matheu	June 20, 2025
Amaia questions Núria about what happened to her, but she is vague at Hugo’s insistence. Jana exercises her power at the HPC by firing long-term staff, including Zoe’s coach and Roque’s physiotherapist. Fatima is declared new captain of the artistic swimming team and breaks up with Cristian, leading him to reconcile with Amaia. After humiliating him during their training, Iker is injured by Cristian, while Núria outperforms Amaia in the pool. The documentary crew plan to expose Roque’s relationship with Sebas, and Hugo threatens Roque not to object. Cristian tells Amaia that Olympo injected him with something that they told him would build muscle, but he doesn’t know what it was. Núria denies ever seeing Zoe in Andorra, and tells her the injection is undetectable and enables them to beat other athletes. After hearing this, Amaia expresses to Zoe that she feels her whole life has been a waste of time if Olympo can use drugs to make people into champions. When the trailer for the documentary airs, Charlie directs homophobic language towards Roque and Sebas, so Roque aggressively beats him up before collapsing as blood pours from his broken hand.
8	"Amaia is Always Right" (Amaia siempre tiene razón)	Ana Vázquez	Laia Foguet	June 20, 2025
Jana holds trials to determine which athletes will compete in the world championships for artistic swimming and track and field. The ADA inform Jana that they plan to do blood tests on the competitors, panicking her and Hugo. The Olympo doctors assure Hugo that Roque is okay, but express concern about continuing with their work, but he orders them to give Zoe the injection. She refuses and is expelled from the HPC by Hugo, despite winning the 800m heptathlon event. Roque tells Hugo that the treatment has numbed all feeling in his body. Cristian disavows Olympo and Iker for deceiving him. Amaia’s mother chastises her for a lack of discipline and for being distracted by her obsession with doping at the HPC. Amaia pushes Fatima down the stairs so she can take her place in the championship duet with Núria. The athletes decide to report Olympo for experimenting on them, and Zoe gives the ADA a drug sample that she stole from their clinic. During the competition, Amaia performs exceptionally, suggesting that she took the injection, and immediately collapses into the pool.

== Reception ==
On the review aggregator website Rotten Tomatoes, Olympo holds an approval rating of 43% based on seven critic reviews.

=== Accolades ===
Awards and nominations received by Olympo
Award	Year	Category	Nominee(s)	Result	Ref.
GLAAD Media Awards	2026	Outstanding Scripted Television Series (Spanish)	Olympo	Nominated	
