= In From the Cold =

2022 Netflix original series

- Promotional poster
- Genre: Drama; Thriller
- Created by: Adam Glass
- Starring: Margarita Levieva; Cillian O'Sullivan; Lydia Fleming
- Composer: Tori Letzler
- Country of origin: United States
- No. of seasons: 1
- No. of episodes: 8

Production
- Executive producer: Adam Glass
- Cinematography: Hermes Marco; Imanol Nabea
- Editors: Amber Bansak; Shawn Paper; Kyle Traynor
- Production companies: Silver Lining Entertainment; Shattered Glass

Original release
- Network: Netflix
- Release: January 28, 2022

In From the Cold is an American spy thriller television series created by Adam Glass. The series follows a divorced mother and ex-Russian spy, living secretly in the United States, as she is forced back into her old life after the CIA learns about her real identity. It was released as a Netflix original on January 28, 2022.

In its first 16 days on Netflix, the show was watched for 85.83 million hours globally.

== Cast and characters ==
=== Main ===
- Margarita Levieva as Jenny Franklin/Anya Petrova/The Whisper, a former Russian spy and assassin living a double-life as a citizen of the United States. She has the ability to shape-shift and camouflage her physical self to her surroundings.
  - Stasya Miloslavskaya as young Anya Petrova
- Cillian O'Sullivan as Chauncey Lew, a veteran CIA officer who recruits and works with Anya.
- Lydia Fleming as Becca Franklin, Jenny's daughter and a promising figure skater.
- Charles Brice as Christopher "Chris" Clarke, a brilliant hacker and tech expert working for the CIA to avoid a prison sentence.
- Alyona Khmelnitskaya as Svetlana Petrova, a former Soviet intelligence operative who trained Anya.

=== Recurring ===
- Anastasia Martin as Faina Orlov, a young Russian woman who falls in love with Anya unaware that she is an assassin whose target is Faina's father.
- José Luis García Pérez as Felipe Calero
- Alexandra Prokhorova as Gala Morazava, a deadly assassin associated with Felipe Calero.

== Episodes ==
No.	Title	Directed by	Written by	Original release date
1	"What Is Burning?"	Ami Canaan Mann	Adam Glass	January 28, 2022
Newly divorced mother Jenny Franklin arrives in Madrid as a chaperone for her daughter Becca's figure skating team. After she leaves the hotel on an errand, Jenny is abducted by CIA agents led by Chauncey, who claims that she is the legendary Soviet-era spy, the Whisper. When she denies it, Chauncey orders her to be killed and Jenny is forced to reveal herself by using advanced combat skills to try and escape. She is offered a deal by Chauncey: assist the CIA in tracking down the source of a series of bizarre incidents in Madrid, or spend her life in prison and have Becca's life ruined. She agrees and is tasked with obtaining a retinal scan of an inmate in a restricted military prison, where she is chased by violent male inmates. With no other choice, Jenny undergoes a painful physical transformation that enables her to assume the identity of a man. In 1994, a younger Jenny, then going by her real name of Anya, is assigned by Russian intelligence to kidnap the daughter of a bioweapons engineer attempting to defect to China.
2	"The Bride"	Ami Canaan Mann	Adam Glass	January 28, 2022
icon
3	"The Widow"	Daniel Calparsoro	Erica L. Anderson	January 28, 2022
icon
4	"The Family"	Daniel Calparsoro	Gaia Violo	January 28, 2022
icon
5	"An Old Friend"	Paco Cabezas	Anya Meksin	January 28, 2022
icon
6	"Little Bird"	Paco Cabezas	Christopher Barbour & Mel D. Jimenez	January 28, 2022
icon
7	"Gideon"	Birgitte Stærmose	Christopher Barbour	January 28, 2022
icon
8	"Motherland"	Birgitte Stærmose	Adam Glass	January 28, 2022
icon
