= Claudia Salas =

Spanish actress (born 1994)

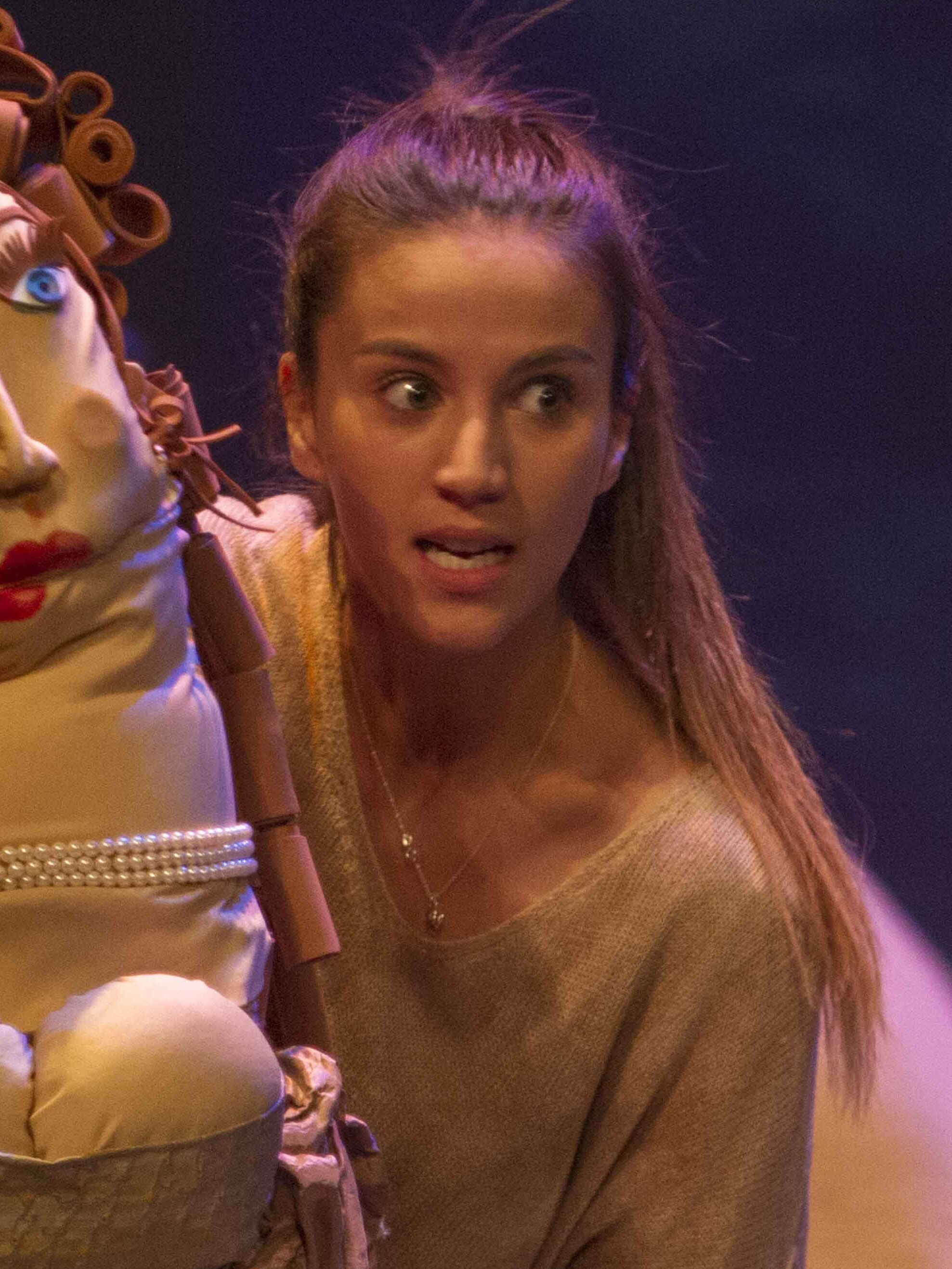
- Salas in 2018
- Born: Claudia Calvo Salas; 23 July 1994 (age 32); Madrid, Spain
- Occupation: Actress

Claudia Calvo Salas (born 23 July 1994), more simply known as Claudia Salas, is a Spanish actress. She gained notability for her portrayal of Rebe in teen drama television series Elite.

== Biography ==
Claudia Calvo Salas was born in Madrid on 23 July 1994. She studied acting at the Arte4 Drama School in Madrid. Her first television opportunity was a minor role in the period soap opera Seis hermanas. Cast as Rebe in the second season of the teen drama series Elite, she played a quintessential choni, resulting into a breakthrough performance after the 2019 release. She then featured as Escalante in the second season of La peste, a performance which earned her a Best New Actress nomination at the 29th Actors and Actresses Union Awards. Salas returned as Rebe in seasons three, four and five of Elite and featured as one of the antagonists in the 2022 horror thriller film Piggy. In February 2022, she joined alongside Ricardo Gómez, Elisabet Casanovas and Àlex Monner the main cast of The Route, a period series about the so-called Ruta del Bakalao.

== Filmography ==
=== Film ===
Key
†	Denotes films that have not yet been released

Year	Title	Role	Notes	Ref.
2022	Cerdita (Piggy)	Maca		
2024	Invasión	María		
2025	Disforia	Vera		
TBD	La reina †	Miriam Gutiérrez		

=== Television ===
Year	Title	Role	Notes	Ref.
2019–22	Élite	Rebeka "Rebe" Parrilla	Main cast (Seasons 2–5); 32 episodes	
2019	La peste	Escalante	Introduced in season 2	
2021	Élite historias breves	Rebeka "Rebe" Parilla	Main cast; 6 episodes	
2022	La ruta (The Route)	Toni		
2023	Las pelotaris 1926	Idoia		
2025	Furia (Rage)	Tina		
2026	Salvador	Julia		
2026	Esa noche (That Night)	Paula		

== Accolades ==
Year	Award	Category	Work	Result	Ref.
2020	29th Actors and Actresses Union Awards	Best New Actress	La peste	Nominated	
2023	10th Feroz Awards	Best Main Actress in a Series	The Route	Won	
