= Ricardo Gomez =

Ricardo Gomez or Ricardo Gómez may refer to:

- Ricardo Gómez Diez (born 1949), Argentine politician
- Ricardo Gómez Pérez (born 1952), Venezuelan photographer
- Ricardo Gómez (footballer, born 1981), Argentine football midfielder
- Ricardo Gómez (soccer, born 1995), American soccer midfielder
- Ricardo Gómez Campuzano (1891–1981), Colombian artist

== See also ==
- Richard Gomez, Filipino actor, TV host, politician, and fencer
- Richard Gómez (footballer)
