= Parndana, South Australia =

Parndana
- Town
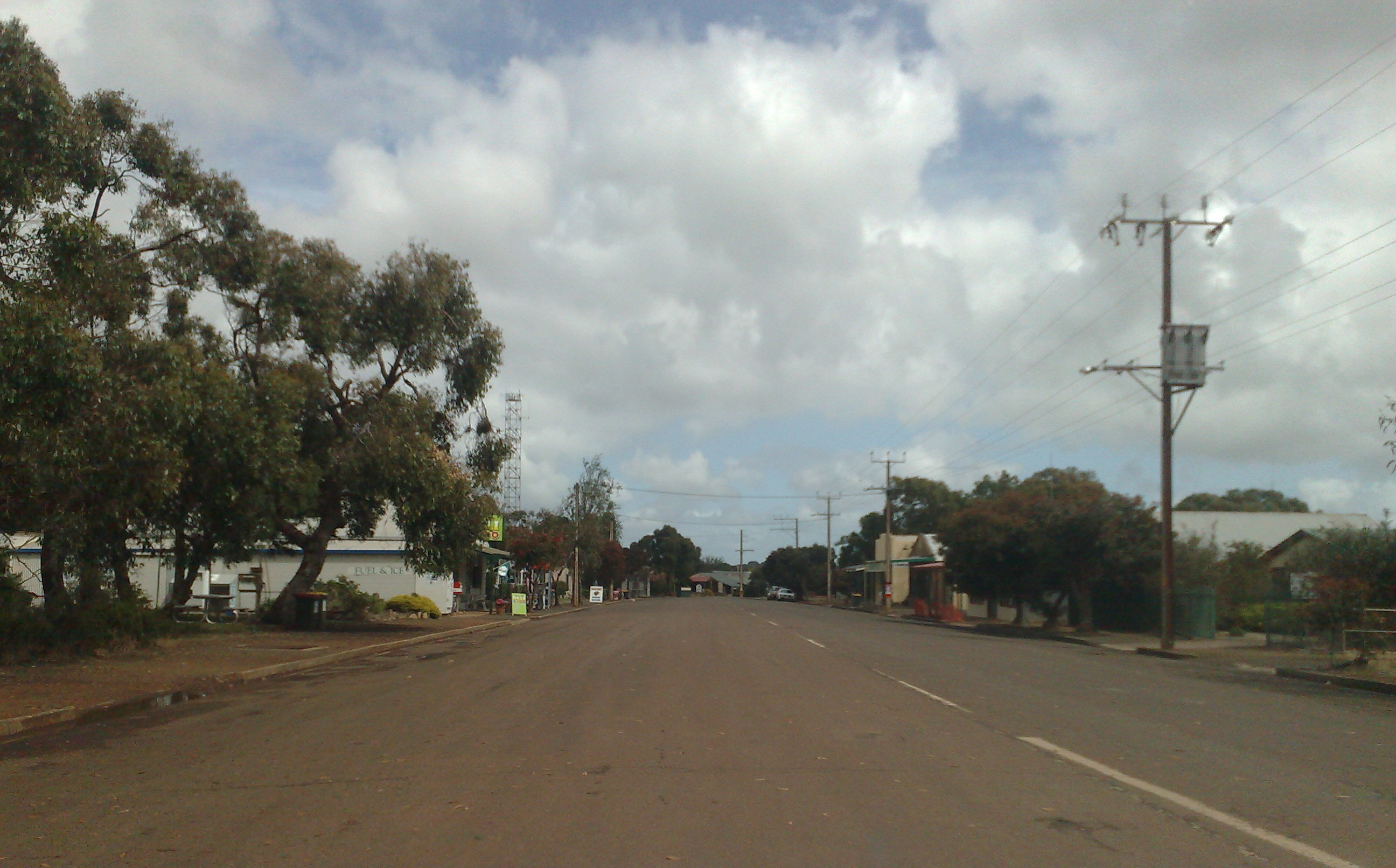
- Parndana

- Coordinates: 35°47′25″S 137°15′46″E
- Country: Australia
- State: South Australia
- Region: Fleurieu and Kangaroo Island
- LGA: Kangaroo Island Council
- Location: 155 km (96 mi) SW of Adelaide; 40 km (25 mi) SW of Kingscote
- Established: 26 July 1951 (town); 16 May 2002 (locality)

Government
  - State electorate: Mawson
  - Federal division: Mayo

Population
  - Total: 155 (SAL 2021)
- Time zone: UTC+9:30 (ACST)
  - Summer (DST): UTC+10:30 (ACDT)
- Postcode: 5220
- County: Carnarvon
- Mean max temp: 20.9 °C (69.6 °F)
- Mean min temp: 9.0 °C (48.2 °F)
- Annual rainfall: 454.8 mm (17.91 in)
Localities around Parndana
Duncan	Cassini	Cassini
Duncan	Parndana	Seddon
Seddon	Seddon	Seddon
- Location; Adjoining localities

Parndana is a town and locality in the Australian state of South Australia located on Kangaroo Island about 155 kilometres (96 mi) southwest of the state capital of Adelaide and about 40 kilometres (25 mi) southwest of the municipal seat of Kingscote.

== History ==
Parndana was established after the Second World War to support the Soldier Settlement Scheme on Kangaroo Island. The name "Parndana" means "The Place of Little Gums".

Returned soldiers and their families began to arrive in the area in 1948, occupying huts brought from a former internment camp, and began to move onto their farms in 1951. A total of 174 families came to live in the area, almost doubling Kangaroo Island's population by 1954.

The Town of Parndana which was proclaimed on 26 July 1951 under the Crown Lands Act 1929-1944, occupied a triangular-shaped area of land in the cadastral unit of the Hundred of Seddon bounded by the Playford Highway on the north-west, the Rowland Hill Highway to the south-west and the Wedgewood Road to the east.

The soldier settlements were established on Crown land, which first had to be cleared of heavy native vegetation. Returned soldiers had to agree to live and work in camps to undertake this clearance work for a number of years before being allocated a block of land which then required further development before they could begin to farm the land, the costs of this further development being bourne by the settlers using government loans (arbitrarily administered by public servants without any specific knowledge of farming needs in the district). Many settlers were unable to succeed in raising sheep (recommended as the best use of the land) because of the widespread use of the Yarloop clover (recommended for use in heavy wet soils), which was subsequently discovered to reduce the fertility of sheep, but at the time the settlers were blamed for their poor farm management skills. Later it was an expensive exercise for farmers to remove the Yarloop clover and replace it with other varieties of clover. As a consequence of these issues, by the 1970s some settlers were in desperate financial circumstances and the government wanted to foreclose on their loans, forcing them to sell their farms, leading to desperate protests and legal action based on the misadvice they had received from public servants.

Boundaries for the locality of Parndana were created on 16 May 2002 which consisted of the town's site and some land to the immediate west. The locality name was spelt incorrectly in the notice gazetted on 16 May 2002 and was subsequently corrected in the South Australian Government Gazette on 29 August 2002.

== Facilities ==
The town has an area school for years reception to 12, a community hotel and two general stores.

The Parndana Research Centre was established to the south of the town as a support for early farming activities but closed in the 1990s.

== Attractions ==
The Soldier Settlement Museum provides information and artefacts relating to the soldier settlement program.

== Sports ==
The Parndana Football Club first fielded teams in 1948, 1949 and 1951 during the early days of the land clearing operations, before being permanently admitted to the Kangaroo Island football league in February 1956.

== Climate ==
Climate data for Parndana East Research Station (sic) (155m ASL), Seddon, South Australia
Month	Jan	Feb	Mar	Apr	May	Jun	Jul	Aug	Sep	Oct	Nov	Dec	Year
Record high °C (°F)	43.0 (109.4)	41.7 (107.1)	38.6 (101.5)	33.2 (91.8)	26.7 (80.1)	20.3 (68.5)	22.2 (72.0)	23.4 (74.1)	26.9 (80.4)	32.4 (90.3)	41.1 (106.0)	41.3 (106.3)	43.0 (109.4)
Mean daily maximum °C (°F)	24.8 (76.6)	25.2 (77.4)	22.7 (72.9)	20.1 (68.2)	16.6 (61.9)	14.2 (57.6)	13.5 (56.3)	14.1 (57.4)	15.4 (59.7)	17.7 (63.9)	20.5 (68.9)	23.1 (73.6)	19.0 (66.2)
Daily mean °C (°F)	18.7 (65.7)	19.3 (66.7)	17.5 (63.5)	15.4 (59.7)	12.8 (55.0)	10.8 (51.4)	10.0 (50.0)	10.3 (50.5)	11.2 (52.2)	12.9 (55.2)	14.9 (58.8)	17.1 (62.8)	14.2 (57.6)
Mean daily minimum °C (°F)	12.5 (54.5)	13.3 (55.9)	12.2 (54.0)	10.6 (51.1)	8.9 (48.0)	7.3 (45.1)	6.5 (43.7)	6.5 (43.7)	7.0 (44.6)	8.1 (46.6)	9.3 (48.7)	11.0 (51.8)	9.4 (48.9)
Record low °C (°F)	5.0 (41.0)	4.8 (40.6)	5.0 (41.0)	2.0 (35.6)	0.9 (33.6)	−0.6 (30.9)	−2.5 (27.5)	−1.0 (30.2)	1.1 (34.0)	0.1 (32.2)	1.2 (34.2)	2.8 (37.0)	−2.5 (27.5)
Average rainfall mm (inches)	16.5 (0.65)	21.1 (0.83)	29.0 (1.14)	49.2 (1.94)	74.4 (2.93)	87.9 (3.46)	101.5 (4.00)	86.1 (3.39)	63.9 (2.52)	45.4 (1.79)	28.7 (1.13)	23.6 (0.93)	627.4 (24.70)
Average rainy days	6.7	6.1	9.8	13.3	18.1	18.5	22.0	21.6	18.6	14.7	11.0	9.2	169.6
Average relative humidity (%) (at 3pm)	48	49	56	60	69	75	76	72	69	64	56	52	62
