= Gillian McAllister =

British author (born 1985)

- Born: 28 February 1985 (age 41); Sutton Coldfield, England
- Education: University of Birmingham
- Occupation: Novelist
- Writing career
- Period: 2017 - present
- Genre: Crime fiction
- Notable works: Everything But The Truth, Anything You Do Say, No Further Questions, The Evidence Against You, How to Disappear, That Night, Wrong Place Wrong Time, Just Another Missing Person, Famous Last Words and Caller Unknown
- Website: gillianmcallister.com

Gillian McAllister (born 28 February 1985) is a British author, known for ten novels, all which have been bestsellers. Her works have been translated into 40 languages. Several of her novels have been optioned for television and film. Her works include Everything But The Truth (2017), Anything You Do Say (published as The Choice in North America), No Further Questions (published as The Good Sister in North America), The Evidence Against You, How To Disappear, and That Night which was a Richard & Judy book club pick and Wrong Place Wrong Time which was a Reese Witherspoon Book Club pick, Sunday Times Bestseller and New York Times bestseller. Just Another Missing Person and Famous Last Words followed, the latter of which was a Sunday Times and New York Times bestseller. Caller Unknown was selected for the Read With Jenna Book Club in 2026.

== Early life and education ==
McAllister was born in Sutton Coldfield and raised in Tamworth. After attending Belgrave High School, McAllister got an English degree at the University of Birmingham. She then converted to law, attending The College of Law.

== Career ==
McAllister wrote fiction in her spare time throughout adulthood, often writing in the evenings and commutes to and from work. She finished her first full (unpublished) novel while suffering from glandular fever for two years. Her debut published novel, Everything But The Truth, was published by Michael Joseph, an imprint of Penguin Random House UK. In its first week, Everything But The Truth reached number six in the Sunday Times Bestseller List. Translation rights have been sold to several foreign publishers. Each of her subsequent novels have been top 20 bestsellers, with her fifth and six, How To Disappear and That Night, hitting the top ten. That Night was selected for the Richard and Judy book club and reached number 1 on the Kindle Store.

Wrong Place Wrong Time has been sold into 40 foreign territories and became an instant global bestseller. Her next novel, Just Another Missing Person, was released in 2023. Famous Last Words followed in 2025, and was both a Sunday Times and New York Times Bestseller. In 2026, Caller Unknown, her tenth novel, was selected as a Read With Jenna bookclub pick.

She also hosts The Honest Authors Podcast with fellow author Holly Seddon.

== Personal life ==
McAllister is married and had a son with her husband in October 2022. She also has a dog called Wendy.

== Bibliography ==
- Everything But The Truth (2017) ISBN 1405928263
- Anything You Do Say (2017) ISBN 1405928271
- No Further Questions (2018)
- The Evidence Against You (2019)
- How To Disappear (2020)
- That Night (2021)
- Wrong Place Wrong Time (2022)
- Just Another Missing Person (2023)
- Famous Last Words (2025)
- Caller Unknown (2026)
