= Holly Seddon =

British journalist and author

- Born: Holly Seddon; January 31, 1980 (age 46); Bath, Somerset, England
- Education: Colyton Grammar School; Open University; Kingston University
- Occupations: Author, journalist
- Years active: 2015-present
- Notable work: Try Not to Breathe; The Hit List; 59 Minutes
- Website: hollyseddon.com

Holly Seddon (born January 31, 1980) is a British journalist and author known for writing the novels Try Not to Breathe, The Hit List, and 59 Minutes.

== Early life and education ==
Seddon grew up moving around the south west of England, living in Devon from age 11. Seddon attended Colyton Grammar School. Instead of going on to formal university, Seddon took various courses with the Open University. She later completed a Master of Arts (MA) at Kingston University in 2023. She has also lived in London, Amsterdam and Kent.

== Career ==
Seddon began her career as a freelance journalist before creating a music news website. She met her future husband, James, who was a writer for the website. She then moved from Birmingham to London where she worked as a journalist for Daily Mail Online. She then worked for The Sun before returning to freelance journalism. She published her first novel, Try Not to Breathe, in 2016. She hosts the Honest Authors Podcast alongside Gillian McAllister. Her books have been published by Orion Publishing Group.

== Bibliography ==
- Try Not to Breathe (2016)
- Don't Close Your Eyes (2017)
- Love Will Tear Us Apart (2018)
- The Hit List (2020)
- The Woman on the Bridge (2022)
- The Short Straw (2023)
- 59 Minutes (2025)
- The Sleeper (2026)
