= 27th Iris Awards (Spain) =

Television awards

- Date: 16 February 2026
- Site: Teatro Real, Madrid, Spain
- Organized by: Academy of Television and Audiovisual Arts and Sciences

The 27th Iris Awards ceremony, presented by the Academy of Television and Audiovisual Arts and Sciences, took place at the Teatro Real in Madrid on 16 February 2026.

== Background ==
The Academy of Television and Audiovisual Arts and Sciences disclosed the nominations in November 2025.

== Winners and nominees ==
The winners and nominees are listed as follows:

Best Actor: Pedro Casablanc — Querer (Movistar Plus+); Daniel Grao — Ángela (Atresmedia); David Verdaguer — El mal invisible (CCMA); Luis Fernández — La Favorita 1922 (Mediaset España); Miguel Bernardeau — Querer (Movistar Plus+); Oriol Pla — I, Addict (Disney+)	Best Actress: Carmen Machi — Celeste (Movistar Plus+); Anna Castillo — Su majestad (Prime Video); Verónica Echegui — Love You to Death (Atresmedia); Candela Peña — Rage (HBO Max); Verónica Sánchez — La Favorita 1922 (Mediaset España); Nagore Aranburu — Querer (Movistar Plus+)
Best Production (Fiction): Susana Herreras, Fran Araújo, Juan Moreno, and Koldo Zuazua — Querer (Movistar Plus+); Carlos Apolinario — Su majestad (Prime Video); Espe García — Mariliendre (Atresmedia); José María Irisarri, Gonzalo Sagardía, Santiago de la Rica, Valentina Pozzoli, and Rodrigo Sopeña — Atasco (Prime Video); Ramón Campos and Ghislain Barrois — La Favorita 1922 (Mediaset España); Sofía Fábregas, Aitor Gabilondo, Laura Rubirola Sala, Javier Giner, and Javier Pascual — I, Addict (Disney+)	Best Production (Entertainment): Ana Jota Martín, Zaida Serrano-Piedracasas, and María Rubio — Pekín Express: Objetivo Angkor (HBO Max); Ana María Bordas, José María Payueta, and Ana Ruiz — Junior Eurovision Song Contest 2024 (RTVE); Ángeles Villamarín and David Barriga — La isla de las tentaciones (Mediaset España); Bruno Pena, Patricia Flores, and José Luis Mata — The Floor (RTVE); David Cardona, Ángeles Villamarín, Víctor Rubio, and Manuel Vázquez Casas — Supervivientes (Mediaset España); Jorge Salvador and Jorge Ventosa — El desafío (Atresmedia)
Best Screenplay (Fiction): Alauda Ruiz de Azúa, Eduard Sola, and Júlia de Paz — Querer (Movistar Plus+); Agustín Martínez, Jorge Díaz, and Antonio Mercero — Two Graves (Netflix); Borja Cobeaga, Diego San José, and José Antonio Pérez Ledo — Su majestad (Prime Video); Javier Ferreiro and Paloma Rando — Mariliendre (Atresmedia); Javier Giner, Jorge Gil, Alba Carballal, and Aitor Gabilondo — I, Addict (Disney+); Pepe Coira and Fran Araújo — La canción (Movistar Plus+)
Best Screenplay (Entertainment): Laura Llopis, Fernando Acevedo, Sergio González, Dani Fontecha, Cristina Correa, Juan del Val, María Dabán, Alberto Sierra, Juan Ibáñez, Damián Mollá, Julia Alcocer, Jordi Moltó, Miguel Gardeñes, Juan Herrera, and Antonio Tejerina — El Hormiguero (Atresmedia); Berto Romero, Rafel Barceló, Júlia Cot, Jordi López, and Mohamed El Boutrouki — El consultorio de Berto (Movistar Plus+); David Navas and Edu García Eyo — El Intermedio (Atresmedia); Screenwriting team — Supervivientes (Mediaset España); Patricia Fernández and Vicente Florindo — MasterChef 13 (RTVE); Ramón Pardina — Futuro imperfecto (RTVE)
Best Fiction: Querer (Movistar Plus+); Ángela (Atresmedia); Two Graves (Netflix); La Favorita 1922 (Mediaset España); Su majestad (Prime Video); I, Addict (Disney+)	Best Show (Documentary): El loco. Los silencios de Quintero (RTVE); Alaska revelada (Movistar Plus+); El incendio del Windsor (Mediaset España); Infiltrada en el búnker (Prime Video); La red (Atresmedia); Los Williams (Netflix)
Best Direction (TV Shows): Santi Villas, Marc Giró, and Rebeca Rodríguez — Late Xou con Marc Giró (RTVE); Andreu Buenafuente, David Martos, and Verónica Díaz — Futuro imperfecto (RTVE); Ángel Ludeña and David Linares — Supervivientes (Mediaset España); Carles Porta — Crimes (CCMA); Laia Vidal and Tinet Rubira — Tu cara me suena (Atresmedia); Meritxell Estruch — La isla de las tentaciones (Mediaset España)	Best Direction (Fiction): Alauda Ruiz de Azúa — Querer (Movistar Plus+); Elena Trapé — Celeste (Movistar Plus+); Enrique Urbizu — When Nobody Sees Us (HBO Max); Félix Sabroso — Rage (HBO Max); Javier Ferreiro — Mariliendre (Atresmedia); Kike Maíllo — Two Graves (Netflix)
Best Presenter (Entertainment): Marc Giró — Late Xou con Marc Giró (RTVE); El Gran Wyoming — El Intermedio (Atresmedia); Miguel Ángel Muñoz — Pekín Express: Objetivo Angkor (HBO Max); Pablo Motos — El Hormiguero (Atresmedia); Paula Vázquez — Bake Off: Famosos al horno (RTVE); Sandra Barneda — La isla de las tentaciones (Mediaset España)	Best Show (Entertainment): Late Xou con Marc Giró (RTVE); El Hormiguero (Atresmedia); First Dates (Mediaset España); Supervivientes (Mediaset España); The Floor (RTVE); Tu cara me suena (Atresmedia)
Best Show (Dissemination): Lo de Évole (Atresmedia); Aquí se hace (RTVM); Control de fronteras: España (DMAX); Generación click (EITB, Prime Video, Movistar Plus+, and CCMA); Las voces de la radio (Movistar Plus+); Órbita Laika (RTVE)	Best Show (Children): La casa de los retos (Mediaset España); Agus y Lui, churros y Crafts (RTVE); Equipo planeta (CMM); Irabazi arte! (EITB); Jotalent Zagales (CARTV); Tik Tak Factory (CCMA)
Best Newscast: Coverage of the 2025 Iberian Peninsula blackout (RTVE); Coverage of the 2024 Spanish floods by Antena 3 Noticias (Atresmedia); Aragón Noticias 1 (CARTV); Coverage of the 2024 Spanish floods by La Sexta noticias (Atresmedia); Noticias Cuatro fin de semana (Mediaset España); Telenotícies vespre (CCMA)	Best Camera Direction: Iván Prado, Vicente Peña, and Ricardo Díaz — Supervivientes (Mediaset España); David F. Rivas — El Hormiguero (Atresmedia); Iván Prado and Vicente Peña — La isla de las tentaciones (Mediaset España); Joana García and Noelia Esteban — The Floor (RTVE); Juan Carlos Carrasco and Luis Cachón — MasterChef 13 (RTVE); Joan Gregorio Rodríguez — El desafío (Atresmedia)
Best Presenter (News): Vicente Vallés — Antena 3 Noticias 2 (Atresmedia); Alba Lago — Noticias Cuatro 1 (Mediaset España); Alejandra Herranz — Telediario 1 (RTVE); María Casado — Informativos Telecinco fin de semana (Mediaset España); Rodrigo Blázquez — La Sexta noticias 20h (Atresmedia); Sandra Golpe — Antena 3 Noticias 1 (Atresmedia)	Best Show (Current Affairs or Magazine): La hora de La 1 (RTVE); El día después (Movistar Plus+); El programa de Ana Rosa (Mediaset España); Coverage of wildfires in Spain by Espejo público (Atresmedia); LaSexta Xplica (Atresmedia); Y ahora Sonsoles (Atresmedia)
Best Presenter (Current Affairs Shows): Adela González — Mañaneros 360 (RTVE); Ana Pastor — El Objetivo (Atresmedia); Ana Terradillos — La mirada crítica (Mediaset España); José Luis Pérez Gómez — El cascabel (Ábside Media); Susanna Griso — Espejo público (Atresmedia); Susana Guasch — Noche de Champions y Europa League (Movistar Plus+)	Best Reporter: Marc Campdelacreu — Telediario (RTVE); Alejandra Andrade — Fuera de cobertura (Mediaset España); Enrique Obrero — Informativos Telecinco fin de semana (Mediaset España); Ester Bertan — Tot es mou (CCMA); Isma Juárez — El Intermedio (Atresmedia); Jalis de la Serna — Apatrullando (Atresmedia)

=== Best original content for platform for the Spanish market ===
- Querer (Movistar Plus+)

=== Best regional program ===
- El campo es nuestro (CARTV)
- En compañía (CMM)

=== Best regional presenter ===
- Modesto Barragán Ríos — Andalucía Directo (RTVA)

=== Iris Audience Award for personality of the year ===
- José Carlos Montoya — La isla de las tentaciones (Mediaset España)

=== Iris Award from the specialized press ===
- Marc Giró
- Alberto Caballero and Laura Caballero

=== Jesús Hermida Lifetime Achievement Award ===
- Carmen Machi
