= Marc Giró =

Spanish TV presenter and journalist (born 1974)

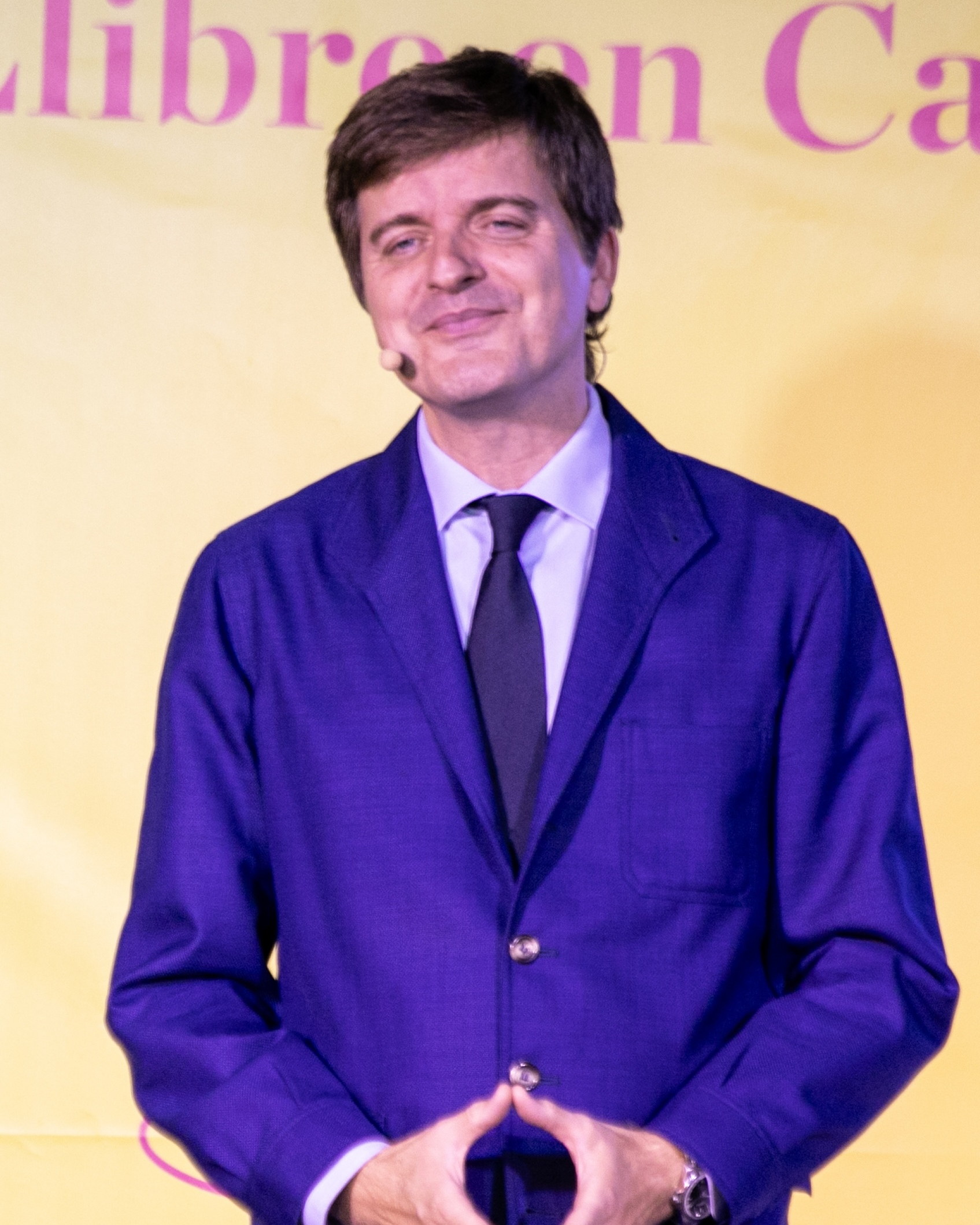
- Giró in 2025.
- Born: Marc Giró i Costa; 18 September 1974 (age 52); Barcelona, Catalonia, Spain
- Education: University of Barcelona (Licenciate)
- Occupations: Television presenter Journalist
- Years active: 1997–present
- Employer(s): RAC 1 TVE (2023–2026); Atresmedia (2026–present)
- Television: “ Esta Passant “ (??) - 2023; Late Xou (2023–2026); Cara al show (2026–present)

Marc Giró i Costa (born 18 September 1974) is a Spanish TV presenter and journalist. Having come to fame as a fashion journalist, he is most well-known for his chat show on La 1, Late Xou.

== Biography ==
Giró graduated with a degree in History of Art from the University of Barcelona. For seventeen years, he worked as the fashion editor at Marie Claire magazine. During this time he became a regular collaborator on TV3 programmes such as Está passant and Divendres. Throughout the 2010s, he was a collaborator on shows such as Espejo Público on Antena 3 and on Zapeando and En el aire with Andreu Buenafuente, both on LaSexta.

Since 2019, Giró has hosted Vostè primer on Catalan radio network RAC 1. He has also become a regular broadcaster on the station, collaborating on shows such as No són hores and Vacances pagades i ADN, both presented by his husband Santi Villas; on El món a RAC1 with Jordi Basté and on Versió RAC1 with Toni Clapés. He has also appeared on Catalunya Ràdio programmes. Giró hosted the New Year bells on RAC 1 welcoming 2021 with a live broadcast from the Casa Vicens, as well as the annual parody of the broadcast on Neox, Felix Año Neox, with Paca la Piraña.

On 5 January 2023, he premiered a late-night chat show on Sunday nights on La 1 in Catalonia, called Late Xou amb Marc Giró. The show was picked up later that year by La 2, moving to Monday nights at 11pm. After achieving strong ratings on La 2, in 2025 the show swapped to La 1 nationwide, going out on Tuesdays at 11pm after La revuelta.

Giró swapped to Atresmedia in January 2026 to host a similar show to Late Xou on LaSexta. To premiere the show, called Cara al show, he appeared on El Hormiguero in March, criticising host Pablo Motos for what he believed to be his politically-biased treatment of guests.

== Personal life ==
Giró lives with his partner, Santi Villas, in Madrid. The pair met while working on Jordi González's show on TV3, Les mil i una, in 1997.
