= Jordi Gratacos Gayola =

Spanish football manager (born 1974)

Jordi Gratacós Gayola
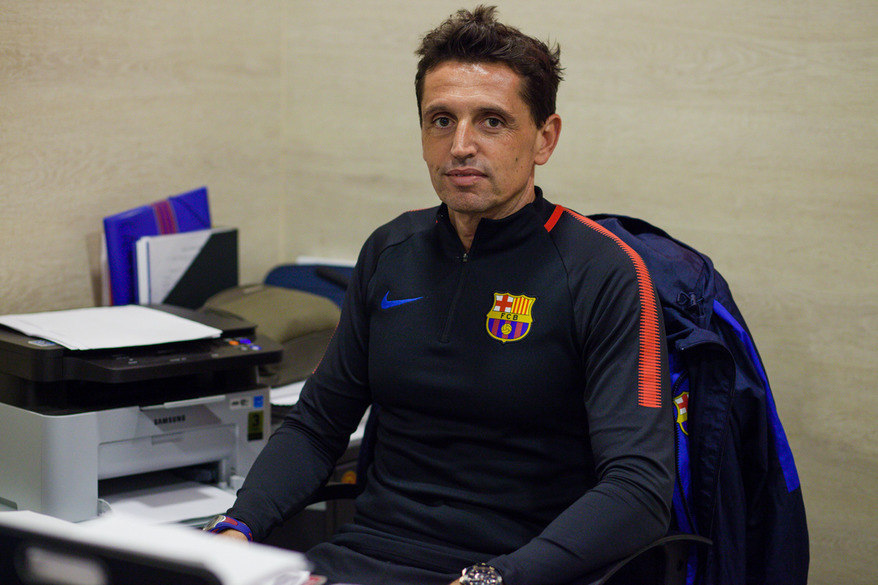
- Jordi Gratacós en su despacho de la FCB Escola en Rúsia

Personal information
- Full name: Jordi Gratacós Gayolà
- Date of birth: 2 June 1974 (age 52)
- Place of birth: Girona

Jordi Gratacos Gayola (born 2 June 1974) is a Spanish football manager. He has a professional license qualification from the UEFA pro license. After finished his playing career at age 34, he took all the football courses from Spanish Football Federation and reached the highest qualification for a football coach.

== Coaching career ==
Gratacos began his coaching career in Girona CF as a Head Coach U16. He had cooperation in 2008 with the Micfootball youth tournament. He served as an Asian football specialist during the World Cup in South Africa 2010. He also was involved in the project Aspire Football Dreams, scouting players around Africa.

In 2010 he became technical director of FCBEscola in Spanish camps, and was appointed as a technical director of FCBEscola Egypt. (First FCBEscola International).

=== FC Dnipro Dnipropetrovsk ===
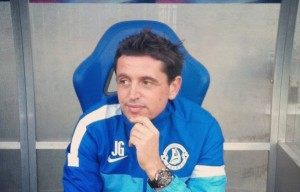
Jordi Gratacós en el banquillo del FC Dnipro.

From 2012 to 2014 he served as a director of the academy in FC Dnipro. He was in charge of all process and football changes in Ukraine though Dnipro. During this period the Ukrainian club had the best record in all youth systems and was known around the country as a Ukrainian FC Barcelona because it adopted their same style, to control the game thorough ball possession. U14, U15, U16 and U17 all reached the DUFL final stages in summer 2014 for the first time in club history. Many players were called to the youth national teams, and his work influenced the national youth system.

Many players who grew up in this system entered professional football.

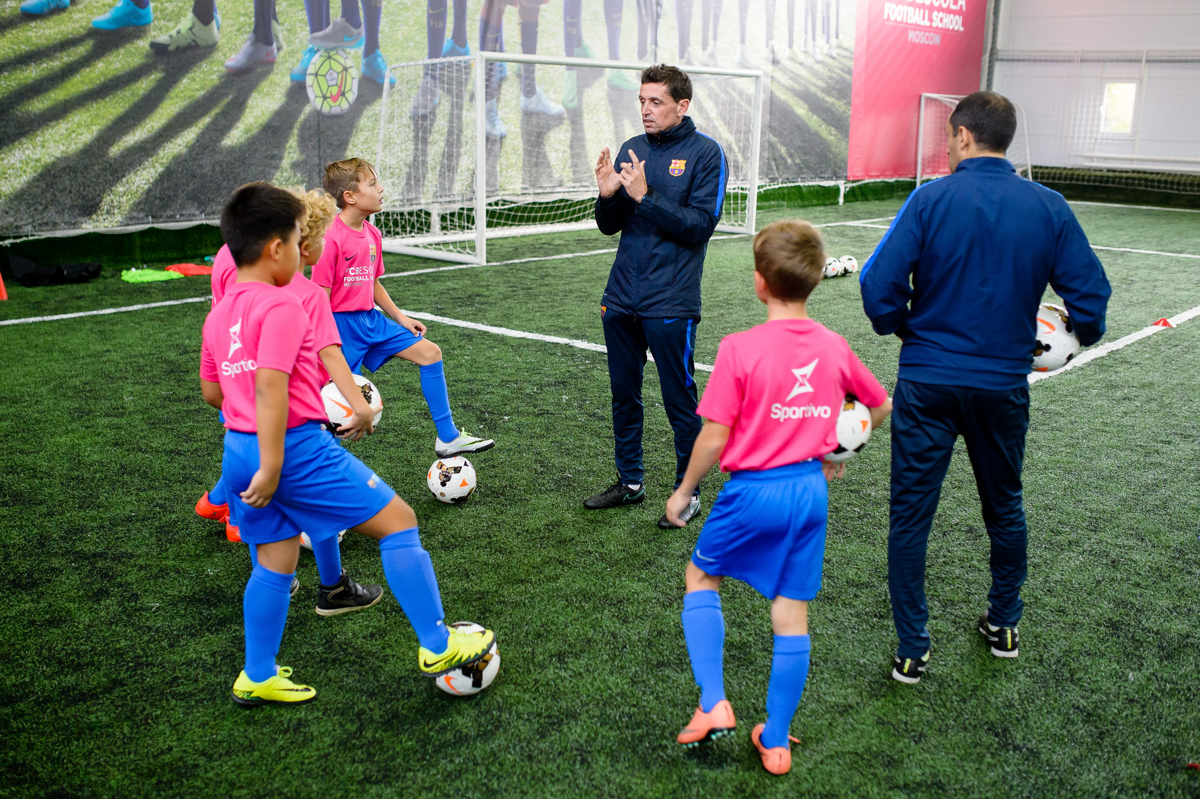
Jordi Gratacós enseñando metodología en un entrenamiento

=== Football Federation of Kazakhstan ===
In July 2015 he contracted with the Football Federation of Kazakhstan for 2 years.

=== FC Barcelona ===
In July 2016 he resigned to join FC Barcelona. A part of the Catalan and Spanish language, he speaks fluent English and Russian. He signed a contract as a technical director FCBEscola in Moscow. with good results.

== Speaker ==
He participated in the International Football Seminar in Georgia 2013, in Galla della Tattica Rome 2015, and other International Master Class in Italy 2016, 2017 and 2018.

During the 2018 World Cup of Russia, participate as a Football Expert and analyst in the program Un Nuevo Dia de Telemundo. Currently he appears as a Football Specialist and analyst, in the Russian national television, Match TV.

== Media football analyst ==
He has experience in media, participating in radio programs from Catalunya Radio and TV programs from International TV such as his analysis during the Confederation Cup 2017 organized in Russia for Telemundo.
