= Contigo Donde Estés =

Video by Chenoa
- Released: December 2006
- Recorded: 2006
- Genres: Pop, Rock, Latin, other
- Label: Vale Music

Chenoa chronology
Mis Canciones Favoritas (2003)	Contigo Donde Estés (2006)

Contigo Donde Estés ("With You Where You Are") is a Live DVD+CD based on the Chenoa's 2006 Nada Es Igual Tour. The DVD is filmed at the successful concert that the artist performs at the Coliseu Balear of Palma de Mallorca on 16 September 2006. It also contains a tour documentary, a 10 minutes gallery of Chenoa photos and the video-clip of her song "Donde Estés" ("Where You Are"), last single of her album Nada Es Igual and the only one from this DVD. It is Gold in Spain.

The CD contains a selection of some of the best live performances of Chenoa in the Nada Es Igual Tour.

== DVD features ==
- Live Concert at the Coliseu Balear of Palma de Mallorca (16 September 2006)
- Nada Es Igual Tour (Documentary)
- Chenoa Photo Gallery

=== Track list ===
1. "Intro"
2. "Nada Es Igual"
3. "Tengo Para Ti"
4. "Siete Pétalos"
5. "En Otro Cielo"
6. "Te Encontré"
7. "Me Enamoro Del Dolor"
8. "Camina"
9. "Dame"
10. "El Centro De Mi Amor"
11. "Desnuda Frente A Ti"
12. "Yo Te Daré"
13. "Soy Lo Que Me Das"
14. "Medley"
15. "Sol, Noche y Luna"
16. "Contigo Y Sin Ti"
17. "Atrévete"
18. "Jam Band’06"
19. "Cuando Tú Vas"
20. "Ladrón De Corazones"
21. "Encadenada A Tí"
22. "Donde Estés…"
23. "En Tu Cruz Me Clavaste"
24. "Rutinas"

== CD track list ==
1. "Intro"
2. "Nada Es Igual"
3. "Siete Pétalos"
4. "En Otro Cielo"
5. "Te Encontré"
6. "Me Enamoro Del Dolor"
7. "Camina"
8. "Dame"
9. "El Centro De Mi Amor"
10. "Desnuda Frente A Ti"
11. "Soy Lo Que Me Das"
12. "Sol, Noche y Luna"
13. "Contigo Y Sin Ti"
14. "Atrévete"
15. "Cuando Tú Vas"
16. "Ladrón De Corazones"
17. "Encadenada A Ti"
18. "Donde Estés…"
19. "En Tu Cruz Me Clavaste"
20. "Rutinas"

== Chart performance ==
Chart	Peak	Weeks On Charts	Certification	Sales
Promusicae	6	7	Gold	10,000+
