= Blanca Busquets =

Catalan journalist and author

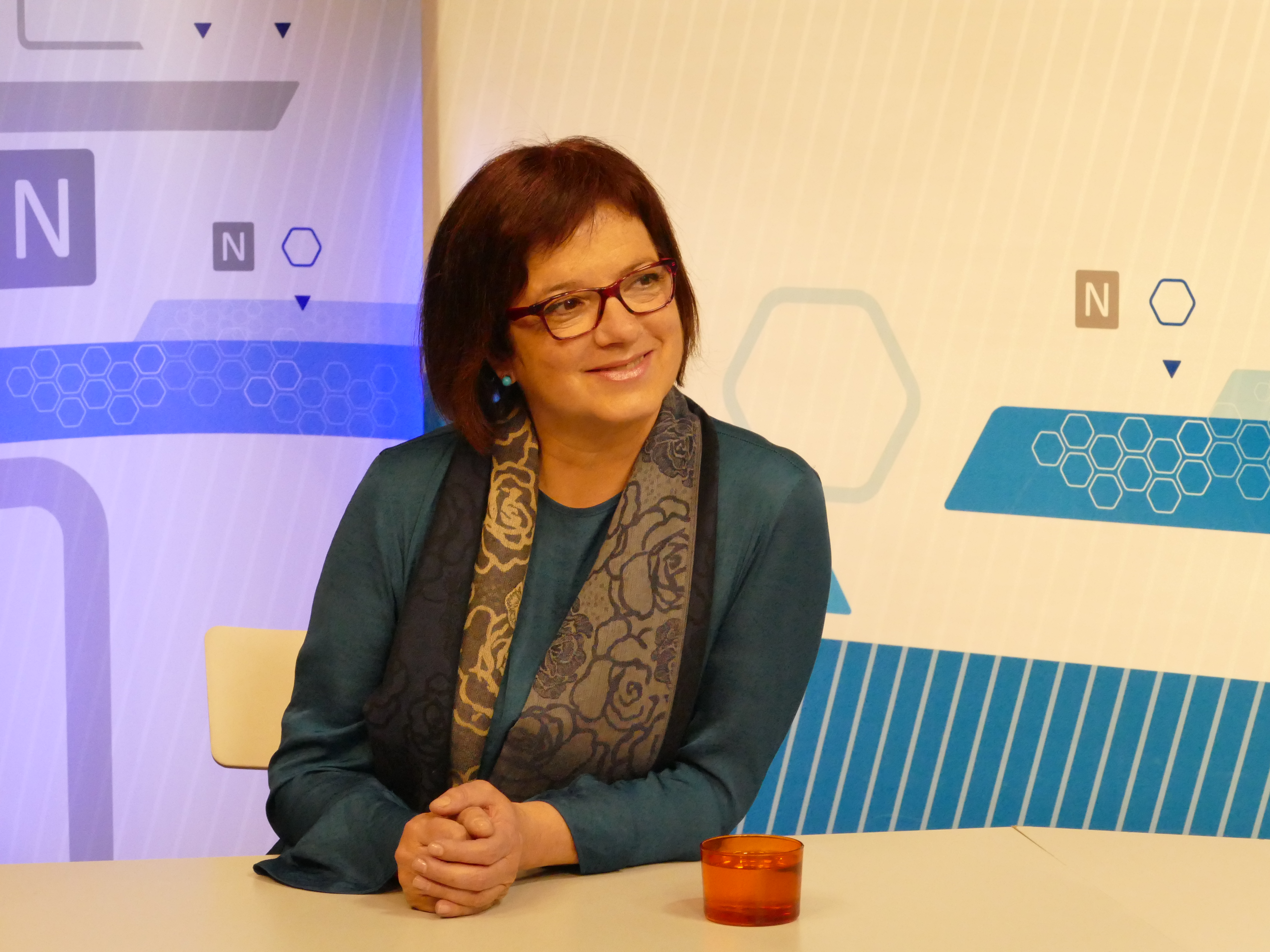
- Born: March 21, 1961 (age 64); Barcelona
- Occupation: Writer and journalist

Blanca Busquets Oliu (Barcelona, 1961) is a Catalan journalist and writer. She is the author of nine novels, for which she has won the 2011 Catalan Booksellers' Prize and the 2015 Alghero Donna Award in Italy. As a journalist, she has worked for Catalunya Ràdio, Catalan public radio broadcaster, since 1986.

== Literary work ==
=== Novel ===
- La casa del silenci (The House of Silence). Rosa dels Vents, 2013
- La nevada del cucut (The Last Snow), Rosa dels Vents, 2010
- Vés a saber on és el cel (Heaven Knows where the Sky is), Rosa dels Vents, 2009
- Tren a Puigcerdà (Train to Puigcerdà), Rosa dels Vents, 2010
- Presó de Neu (Prison of snow), Rosa dels Vents, 2010
