= Duele =

Duele (Spanish for "It Hurts") may refer to:

- "Duele" (Chenoa song), 2009
- "Duele" (Reik and Wisin & Yandel song), 2019
- "Duele", a 2017 song by Bomba Estéreo from Ayo
- "Duele", a 2004 song by Lu
- "Duele", a 2015 song by Natalia Lafourcade from Hasta la Raíz
- "Duele", a 2020 song by Tini and John C from Tini Tini Tini
- "Duele", a 2002 song by Tito El Bambino from A la Reconquista
- "Dueles", a 2015 song by Jesse & Joy from Un Besito Más
