= Soy Mujer =

Studio album by Chenoa
- Released: October 20, 2003 (Spain)
- Recorded: July–September, 2003 in Miami and Madrid.
- Genre: Pop, Rock, Latin.
- Length: 46:29
- Label: Sony BMG, Jive/Zomba, Vale Music
- Producer: Carlos Quintero

Chenoa chronology
Mis Canciones Favoritas (2003)	Soy Mujer (2003)	Nada Es Igual (2005)

Professional ratings
Review scores
Source	Rating
Allmusic	4.5/5 stars

Soy Mujer (I'm a Woman), is the third album released by Argentine-Spanish music artist Chenoa (second of studio), following Chenoa and the unplugged album Mis Canciones Favoritas. It was recorded in Miami and Madrid from July to September 2003. It is a pop, rock, dance, and Latin album, all mixed with Arab and anglosaxon sounds. Like her first work, the album contains two songs in English, "Why You Doin' Like That" and the bonus track "What My Heart Wants To Say" featuring Gareth Gates.

Released on October 20, 2003, it reached number one in the Spanish album chart, and sold more than 200,000 copies in that country, after 47 weeks in the Top 100.

The first single, "En Tu Cruz Me Clavaste" reached one more #1 hit for Chenoa in Spain, and was preceded by "Soy Lo Que Me Das" #2, "Siete Pétalos" #2, "Dame" #1 and finally only for promotion "Soy Mujer".

In May and June 2004 she started "Soy Mujer" promotional tour around Venezuela, Puerto Rico and Argentina. In December she visited Panama, Costa Rica and Dominican Republic.

== Track listing ==
1. "En Tu Cruz Me Clavaste" - 3:45
2. "Dame" - 3:18
3. "Si No Estás" - 3:51
4. "Profano O Sagrado" - 4:26
5. "Siete Pétalos" - 3:09
6. "Sigo Aquí" - 4:12
7. "Soy Lo Que Me Das" - 4:01
8. "En Otro Cielo" - 3:24
9. "Soy Mujer" - 4:31
10. "Qué Puedo Hacer" - 3:49
11. "Why You Doin' Like That" - 3:19
12. "Adiós" - 4:44
13. Bonus Track: "What My Heart Wants To Say" (With Gareth Gates)

== Singles ==
Release date	Single	SPA	VEN
October, 2003	En Tu Cruz Me Clavaste; Written by Luque.	1	1
January, 2004	Soy Lo Que Me Das; Written by Luque.	2	
April, 2004	Siete Pétalos; Written by Minoia & Pinilla Rogado.	2	
August, 2004	Dame; Written by Alvarez, Nicolás, Velázquez.	1	
2004	Soy Mujer; Written by Alvarez, Luque, Nicolás, Velázquez.	Promo; Only	

== Charts ==
Chart	Provider	Peak position	Weeks on Chart	Certification	Sales
Spain	Promusicae	1	47	2× Platinum	220,000+
Venezuela	Recordland	2	—	—	—

== Awards ==
One more time, she was nominated for the Spanish music industry awards Premios Amigo, now in the categories of best female artist and completed an 80-date tour in Spain. In 2004 she was nominated for the Tu Música award as best new artist, in Puerto Rico.

Venezuela has awarded Chenoa in 2005 with the Mara de Oro to the best new international artist of the year.
