= The Floor (Spanish game show) =

The Floor is a Spanish game show based on the international franchise of the same name. The show aired from 6 September to 25 October 2023 on Antena 3, and from 23 April 2025 on La 1. It was presented on Antena 3 by Manel Fuentes and on La 1 by Chenoa.

== History ==
In April 2023, Atresmedia reached an agreement with Talpa for the rights to make an adaptation of The Floor, a game show that had achieved a 22.4% audience share in the Netherlands. Manel Fuentes was announced as presenter.

The Floor debuted on Antena 3 at 22:45 on 4 September 2023, in the first week of the new television season. The show had 1.432 million viewers and a 16.9% audience share, nearly twice the audience of any other programme on at the same time, and only beaten by the preceding El Hormiguero for prime-time shows that night. It ended its eight-episode first season on 25 October with 1.136 million viewers and 13.9% of the audience, again leading in its timeslot, a feat that it only failed to achieve for its seventh episode.

In September 2024, the board of RTVE approved the production of a new series of The Floor, through the company Satisfaction Iberia. Two months later, singer Chenoa was announced as the new presenter. The show returned on 23 April 2025 with 1.063 million viewers and 12.9% of the audience, beating its former channel by 0.4 percentage points to be the most watched show in prime time. On 18 June, the eight-episode season ended with a record 1.195 million viewers and 14% of the audience; as before, the show led in prime time for all but one episode of its season.

== Format ==
One hundred contestants start the series on a square divided into one hundred squares. Each contestant starts with a specialist subject. A contestant is chosen to challenge a neighbour on the latter's specialist subject, via a duel of naming examples of that subject from photographs. The winner takes the loser's square as their own territory, and the loser is eliminated.

The game lasts over the entire broadcast season as contestants are eliminated in each episode. The winner of the entire game wins €100,000.
