= Babilonia =

- DVD
- Directed by: Jorge Salvador
- Written by: Armando Discépolo (play); Jorge Salvador
- Produced by: Jaime L. Lozano
- Music by: Óscar Cardozo Ocampo
- Release date: 1987
- Country: Argentina
- Language: Spanish

Babilonia is a 1987 Argentine drama film directed and written by Jorge Salvador based on a play by Armando Discépolo.

== Synopsis ==
The conflicts experienced by both the owners and the servants living in the house of a wealthy Italian.

== Release ==
The film premiered in Argentina in August 1987.

== Cast ==
- Ricardo Bertone
- Raúl Escobar
- Isabel Brunello
- Graciela Castro
- César Carducci
- Victor Moll
- Esther Fernández
- Jani Bonetto
- Chiochi Cardarelli
- Guillermo Lombardi
- Cecilia Flores
