= Nada Es Igual =

Nada Es Igual may refer to:

- Nada Es Igual... (Luis Miguel album) (1996)
- Nada es igual (Franco De Vita album) (1999)
- Nada Es Igual (Chenoa album) (2005)
- "Nada Es Igual" (Kudai song) (2008)
