= Desafiando la gravedad =

Studio album by Chenoa
- Released: October 6, 2009
- Recorded: July 2009
- Genre: Pop
- Language: Spanish
- Label: Universal Music

Chenoa chronology
Absurda Cenicienta (2007)	Desafiando la gravedad (2009)	Otra dirección (2013)

Singles from Desafiando la gravedad
- 1. "Duele" Released: July 2009; 2. "Buenas notícias" Released: October 2009; 3. "Nada de nada (featuring Gloria Trevi)" Released: 2nd quarter 2010

Professional ratings
Review scores
Source	Rating
AllMusic	3.5/5 stars

Desafiando la gravedad (English: Defying Gravity) is the fifth studio album by the Spanish singer Chenoa. The album was composed and written by Chenoa's herself, in collaboration with the producers Mauricio Gasca and Yoel Henriquez, and recorded in July 2009 in Miami.

The first single, "Duele", is a ballad released to radio on July 25, 2009. The album was released October 6, 2009, in Spain, and in Latin America and the United States in early 2010.

== Track listings ==
=== CD ===
1. Buenas Noticias -4:14
2. Duele -4:30
3. Nada de Nada (Dúo con Gloria Trevi) -4:09
4. Como una Postal -4:15
5. Lo Que Te Haría -3:40
6. Me Caes Tan Bien -4:09
7. Desafiando la Gravedad -3:29
8. Transformación -3:30
9. Nada es Fácil ni Difícil -3:29
10. Defectos Perfectos -3:10
11. Te Puedo Perdonar (Canción cedida por Coti) -3:11
12. Gatúbela -3:19
13. La Diferencia (Bonus Track) -3:14

=== DVD ===
1. Videoclip “Duele”
2. Making Of Videoclip “Duele”
3. Videoclip “Buenas Noticias”
4. Making Of Videoclip “Buenas Noticias”
5. Making Of Sesión Fotográfica “Tweety By Chenoa”
6. Entrevista Con Chenoa
7. Cómo Se Grabó El Álbum “Desafiando La Gravedad”
8. Galería De Fotos

== Release history ==
Region	Date	Label
Spain	October 6, 2009	Universal Music
Latin America	2nd quarter, 2010	Universal Music

== Charts ==
Chart performance for Desafiando la gravedad
Chart (2009)	Peak position
Spanish Albums (PROMUSICAE)	3

== Singles ==
=== "Duele" ===
The first single in Spain was Duele. This pop-rock ballad was released on radios July 25, 2009. Chenoa wanted to show a sensitive song of her album in her home country, while in Latin America she will release a fast song as first single. Duele has peaked #14 on the Spanish singles chart so far.

=== "Buenas notícias" ===
The second single of the album, a beat-up pop song scheduled to be promoted in October along with the album release. The music video features Chenoa as a TV newsreader, and dancing on a table with a few dancers. The video was shot in one of the TVE sets.

=== "Nada de nada (feat. Gloria Trevi)" ===
Another single announced by her label and Chenoa, is the duet with the Mexican singer Gloria Trevi. It is expected to be released throughout America in spring, 2010.
