= Crimes (Catalan radio and television program) =

- Crims
- Genre: True crime
- Created by: Carles Porta
- Presented by: Carles Porta
- Country of origin: Spain
- Original language: Catalan
- No. of seasons: 5
- No. of episodes: 46

Production
- Producers: Gemma Felius and Xesc Estapé
- Production company: Goroka

Original release
- Release: 3 February 2020 – 10 May 2021

Crimes (Crims in the original language) is a Catalan radio and television program on true crime co-produced by the Catalan Audiovisual Media Corporation and the production company Goroka and presented by Carles Porta and Gasset. Its broadcasts began on September 8, 2018, in the radio version on Catalunya Ràdio, while the first episode of the television version on Televisió de Catalunya (TV3) aired on February 3, 2020

The televised episodes of the program are partially subtitled in Catalan (except for interventions in Spanish), and they are expected to be subtitled in Spanish, English, and Arabic as well.

== Plot ==
The program, through radio and television episodes lasting between 50 minutes and one hour, depicts real crimes that occurred in Catalonia (and, in some cases, in other territories of the Catalan Countries or other states) from the second half of the 20th century and the 21st century. The narrative genre used is that of a novelized true crime chronicle, delivered with solemnity and austerity by the acclaimed radio and television presenter Carles Porta —who introduces each case, opens investigative lines, and reveals new facts in every episode— and combined with contributions from people directly or indirectly involved in the case: family members and friends of the victims, law enforcement bodies such as the Mossos d'Esquadra or the Civil Guard, forensic doctors, investigating judges, crime reporters like Mayka Navarro or Tura Soler, attorneys representing the parties, and even some of the initially accused.

In each episode, the testimonies of those involved and the dramatized narrations are accompanied by fictional reenactments of the events, as well as archive footage from TV3, newspaper clippings, police documentation, and aerial shots taken by drones of the towns and areas where the events took place.

No. overall	No. in season	Title	Directed by	Written by	Original release date	Viewers (millions)
1	1	"Brito i Picatoste"	Santi Baró, Carles Porta i Enric Álvarez	Enric Álvarez	February 3, 2020	541,000 (22.5%)
2	2	"Brito i Picatoste"	Santi Baró, Carles Porta i Enric Álvarez	Enric Álvarez	February 3, 2020	490,000 (26.6%)
3	3	"El zelador d'Olot"	Santi Baró, Carles Porta i Carlos Torres	Carlos Torres	February 10, 2020	419,000 (16.7%)
1	1	"Brito i Picatoste"	Santi Baró, Carles Porta i Enric Álvarez	Enric Álvarez	February 3, 2020	541.000 (22,5%)
2	2	"Brito i Picatoste"	Santi Baró, Carles Porta i Enric Álvarez	Enric Álvarez	February 3, 2020	490.000 (26,6%)
3	3	"El zelador d'Olot"	Santi Baró, Carles Porta i Carlos Torres	Carlos Torres	February 10, 2020	419.000 (16,7%)
4	4	"L'assassí del Putxet"	Santi Baró, Carles Porta i Neus Sala	Neus Sala	February 17, 2020	472.000 (19,2%)
5	5	"Josep Talleda, l'"Espereu-me""	Santi Baró, Laia Foguet i Carles Porta	Laia Foguet	February 24, 2020	508.000 (19,6%)
6	6	"Josep Talleda, l'"Espereu-me""	Santi Baró, Laia Foguet i Carles Porta	Laia Foguet	March 2, 2020	452.000 (17,8%)
7	7	"Mataiaies"	Santi Baró, Carles Porta i Carlos Torres	Carlos Torres	March 9, 2020	455.000 (18,0%)
8	8	"Machala"	Santi Baró, Carles Porta i Enric Álvarez	Enric Álvarez	March 16, 2020	458.000 (18,5%)
9	9	"La bibliotecària Helena Jubany"	Santi Baró, Pol Izquierdo i Carles Porta	Pol Izquierdo i Carlos Torres	March 23, 2020	461.000 (22,5%)
10	10	"La bibliotecària Helena Jubany"	Santi Baró, Pol Izquierdo i Carles Porta	Pol Izquierdo i Carlos Torres	March 23, 2020	508.000 (19,4%)
11	Especial	"Per què matem? (Especial)"	Santi Baró, Carles Porta i Enric Álvarez	José Ramón Fernández i Enric Álvarez	April 28, 2020	333.000 (12,9%)

No. overall	No. in season	Title	Directed by	Written by	Original release date	Viewers (millions)
12	1	"Piris"	Santi Baró i Carles Porta	Carlos Torres	February 22, 2021	453.000 (17,0%)
13	2	"Santaló"	Santi Baró i Carles Porta	Gerard Peris i Enric Álvarez	March 1, 2021	495.000 (19,6%)
14	3	"Ca n'Amat"	Santi Baró i Carles Porta	Laia Foguet	March 15, 2021	401.000 (15,6%)
15	4	"La flor"	Santi Baró i Carles Porta	Gerard Peris i Enric Álvarez	March 22, 2021	469.000 (17,9%)
16	5	"Angi"	Santi Baró i Carles Porta	Carlos Torres	March 29, 2021	480.000 (19,3%)
17	6	"Permanyer (Part I)"	Santi Baró i Carles Porta	Gerard Peris i Enric Álvarez	April 12, 2021	505.000 (20,2%)
18	7	"Permanyer (Part II)"	Santi Baró i Carles Porta	Gerard Peris i Enric Álvarez	April 19, 2021	497.000 (20,1%)
19	8	"Sant Ruf"	Santi Baró i Carles Porta	Marc González de la Varga	April 26, 2021	518.000 (19,8%)
20	9	"Castell (Part I)"	Santi Baró i Carles Porta	Carlos Torres	May 3, 2021	509.000 (19,6%)
21	10	"Castell (Part II)"	Santi Baró i Carles Porta	Carlos Torres	May 10, 2021	450.000 (18,3%)

== Emission ==
At present, the program emits in Catalonia Radio since the September 8, 2018 and at TV3 since the February 3, 2020.
