= Chenoa =

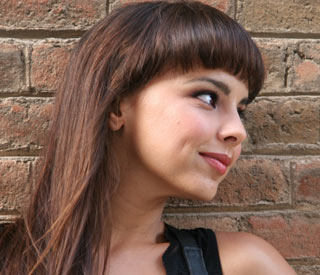
- Born: María Laura Corradini Falomir; June 25, 1975 (age 51); Mar del Plata, Argentina
- Other name: Chenoa
- Occupations: Singer; songwriter; model; Television presenter
- Years active: 2001–present
- Height: 1.65 m (5 ft 5 in)
- Spouse: Miguel Sánchez Encinas (m. 2022)
- Partner: David Bisbal (2001–2005)
- Musical career
- Genres: Latin; R&B; pop; pop rock
- Instruments: Vocals; piano
- Website: Official website

María Laura Corradini Falomir (born June 25, 1975), known professionally as Chenoa, is an Argentine-Spanish music artist who rose to fame as a contestant on reality television singing competition Operación Triunfo. Her music style could be described as pop. Most of her music is in Spanish, although a few tracks on some albums were recorded in English. She has sold more than 1,000,000 records since 2002.

== Early life ==
Chenoa was born in Mar del Plata, Argentina on June 25, 1975, although her family moved to Mallorca, Spain, when she was eight. She grew up in a musical family; both parents were musicians who used to sing in hotels at live music shows. At the age of 16, Chenoa began to sing professionally, taking part in her parents' show. When her mother fell ill, Chenoa had to stand in for her. Her fathers family is of Italian descent and her maternal grandmother is Lebanese.

She graduated as a nursery school teacher and started performing in the Casino de Mallorca shows when she was 20. There, Chenoa acquired a good stage presence before entering the first edition of the Spanish television show Operación Triunfo in 2001.

== Career ==
Her first album was Chenoa, released in April 2002 in Spain. The first single was Atrévete, a song whose English version is also included in the album as Mystify, but the greatest hit of this album was Cuando tú vas, played all over Spain in the summer of 2002. Chenoa sold over 500,000 copies in Spain after 61 weeks in the Top 100 chart, and she was nominated for the Spanish music industry awards Premios Amigo as best new female artist and best female artist. Year 2002 finished with a Spanish tour that included more than 90 dates. In April 2003, Chenoa competed in and won Eurobest, a European singing contest in which she performed "It's Raining Men".

The unplugged album Mis canciones favoritas was Chenoa's second album. It was recorded in Barcelona in April 2003, and included some of her favorite songs such as "Man in The Mirror", "Respect", "Chain of Fools", and "Love of My Life". This CD + DVD was released on a limited edition of 100,000 copies.

Soy mujer was the title of her second studio album, recorded in Miami and Madrid in 2003. Pop, rock, Latin, Arab, and Anglo sounds are mixed in this album, which reached number one in the Spanish album chart and sold more than 250,000 copies after 47 weeks in the top 100. The album also charted in Venezuela reaching the number two position.

The singles released were "En tu cruz me clavaste", "Soy lo que me das", "Siete pétalos", "Dame" (which topped the Spanish charts for three consecutive weeks in 2004), and Soy mujer. Chenoa was nominated again for the Premios Amigo award for Best Female Artist and completed an 80-date tour in Spain. In 2004, she was nominated for the Tu Música award as best new artist in Puerto Rico.

In May and June 2004, she started her Soy mujer promotional tour around Venezuela, Puerto Rico, and Argentina. In December, she visited Panama, Costa Rica, and Dominican Republic.

In April 2005, the Spanish Radio and Television Associations Federation awarded her the Micrófono de Oro 2005. Venezuela has also awarded Chenoa in 2005 with the Mara de Oro 2005 for the Best New International Artist of the Year.

Chenoa's third studio album Nada es igual was released in November. Produced by Dado Parisini (Laura Pausini, Nek, Tears for Fears), and recorded in Milan, this pop-rock album explored a new direction in Chenoa's music. Nada es igual was not only a sample of her musical evolution, but also of her new personal challenge. "Rutinas" was the first single, which again reached number one in the Spanish charts. The album sold more than 100,000 copies in Spain after 21 weeks in the top 100 and was also promoted in Mexico and other Latin-American countries. The following singles were "Tengo para ti" and "Donde estés". 2006 finished with a Spanish tour of more than 40 locations. "Me enamoro del dolor" was covered in English by Maria Arredondo titled "Even When You're With Me".

On October 9, 2007, Chenoa released her fifth studio album called Absurda Cenicienta, for which she wrote all the songs herself. The first single was "Todo irá bien". The album peaked at number one in the iTunes Latin Albums and went to the number two position in the Spanish albums charts. It also received Gold certification in its first week in the Spanish album chart. The single "Todo irá bien" has topped the charts in Puerto Rico, Costa Rica, Spain, etc. and a total of 12 countries.

On July 25, 2009, Chenoa's new single "Duele" from her upcoming album, Desafiando la gravedad, premiered for the first time on Cadena Dial. Desafiando la gravedad finds her once again co-writing the bulk of her material, this time with producers Yoel Henríquez and Mauricio Gasca, and once again developing her style as a pop/rocker. The album opens with a trio of standout songs that signal the direction of the album. The opener, "Buenas Noticias", is an upbeat song with acoustic guitar, a syncopated drum track, and bubbly touches of electronic effects. The chorus hits hard with Chenoa belting out the refrain as a dense Wall of Sound kicks in, electric guitar, backup vocals, and all. "Nada de Nada" is more intense, a surging electro-rock song powered by an overdriven electric guitar riff and muscular duet vocals by Mexican diva Gloria Trevi. These two songs are interspersed by "Duele," a power ballad of heartbreak that showcases the vulnerable side of Chenoa. While these three standout songs get Desafiando la Gravedad off to an impressive start, there's plenty more to enjoy as the album progresses, changing tempo often over the course of its dozen tracks.'

She was selected to join Italian tenor Andrea Bocelli in his 2011 World Tour.

In November 2011 Chenoa released Como un fantasma (EP) produced by Nigel Walker. The first single was "Como un fantasma" and the second one "Simplemente tú".

From September 2012 till 2013, Chenoa took part in the Spanish radio morning show Atrévete (Cadena Dial) on Tuesdays and Thursdays.

On September 17, 2013, Chenoa released her sixth studio album Otra dirección both in English and Spanish via Alias Music. She wrote all the Spanish lyrics herself. The album was recorded in London at Phrased Differently studios, in Madrid and Barcelona. It came preceded by the lead single "Quinta Dimensión" and its English version "Life's an Equation", released in late-June. The song "Júrame" (English version: "Humanized") was released as the second single in late-January 2014.

On April 1, 2016, Chenoa released her seventh studio album #SoyHumana via Alias Music. She wrote almost all the lyrics herself. The album was recorded in Majorca, Spain and entirely produced by Swedish producer Maria Marcus. It came preceded by the lead single "Soy Humana". Then two more single was taken from that album "Tú y Yo" and "Entra en mi Realidad". Chenoa toured during 2 years with this album with almost 40 gigs.

In 2024 she collaborated with singer Ana Guerra on the song "Me Quiero Más a Mí". She hosted the New Year bells with Marc Giró on TVE for 2025/26, substituting for Andreu Buenafuente and Silvia Abril.

== Current projects ==
- Chenoa is participating as a judge in Spanish TV show Tu cara me suena (Your Face Sounds Familiar)
- Since 2022, Chenoa has a late night show Europa FM with 'Take it less seriously'( Tómatelo menos en serio).
- Operación Triunfo 2023, a Spanish reality television music competition to find new singing talent was presented by Chenoa, aired on Amazon Prime Video on november 20th 2023.
- In 2024, Chenoa will be a contestant of the fourth season of El Desafío. (The Challenge).

== Personal life ==
From 2001 to 2005, Chenoa was in a relationship with David Bisbal.

On June 17, 2022, she married the urologist, Miguel Sánchez Encinas in an intimate ceremony in Mallorca.

On Saturday November 11, 2023 it was reported that the two had separated.

== Discography ==
=== Studio albums ===
List of studio albums, with selected chart positions and certifications
Title	Album details	Peak chart positions		Certifications
Title	Album details	SPA	ARG	Certifications
Chenoa	Released: April 22, 2002; Label: Jive/Zomba, Vale Music	2	5	SPA: 4× Platinum
Mis Canciones Favoritas	Released: May 26, 2003; Label: Jive/Zomba, Vale Music, BMG	4	7	SPA: Gold
Soy Mujer	Released: October 21, 2003; Label: Jive/Zomba, Vale Music, BMG	1	10	SPA: 2× Platinum
Nada Es Igual	Released: November 15, 2005; Label: Vale Music, Universal Music Spain	6	20	SPA: Platinum
Absurda Cenicienta	Released: October 9, 2007; Label: Vale Music, Universal Music Spain	2	3	SPA: Gold
Desafiando la Gravedad	Released: October 6, 2009; Label: Universal Music Spain	3	—	—
Otra Dirección	Released: September 17, 2013; Label: Alias Music	5	—	
#SoyHumana	Released: April 1, 2016; Label: Alias Music	3	—	

=== EPs ===
List of extended plays, with selected details
Title	Album details
Como un fantasma	Released: November 22, 2011; Label: Universal Music Spain

=== Singles ===
Year	Single	Position											Album
Year	Single	ESP	ARG	CHL	COL	MEX	COR	ECU	PRI	PER	URU	VEN	Album
2002	"Atrévete"	1	4	—	3	—	—	—	—	—	—	—	Chenoa
2002	"Cuando tú vas"	1	14	—	1	—	—	—	—	—	—	—	Chenoa
2002	"Yo te daré"	18	—	—	—	—	—	—	—	—	—	—	Chenoa
2002	"El centro de mi amor"	28	—	—	—	—	—	—	—	—	—	—	Chenoa
2003	"Desnuda frente a ti"	8	—	—	—	—	—	—	—	—	—	—	Mis canciones favoritas
2003	"En tu cruz me clavaste"	1	—	—	—	—	—	—	—	—	—	1	Soy mujer
2004	"Soy lo que me das"	13	—	—	1	—	—	—	—	—	—	—	Soy mujer
2004	"Siete pétalos"	10	—	—	—	—	—	—	—	—	—	—	Soy mujer
2004	"Dame"	4	—	—	18	—	—	—	—	—	—	—	Soy mujer
2004	"Soy mujer"	21	—	—	—	—	—	—	—	—	—	—	Soy mujer
2005	"Rutinas"	1	—	—	1	100	—	—	—	—	—	—	Nada es igual
2006	"Tengo para ti"	16	7	—	—	—	—	—	—	—	—	—	Nada es igual
2006	"Donde estés..."	—	—	—	—	—	—	—	—	—	—	—	Nada es igual
2007	"Todo irá bien"	6	17	11	1	18	1	1	1	1	—	3	Absurda Cenicienta
2008	"El bolsillo del revés"	14	—	89	19	—	1	4	2	—	—	—	Absurda Cenicienta
2008	"Absurda cenicienta"	1	—	94	7	46	1	2	1	1	—	—	Absurda Cenicienta
2009	"Duele"	14	—	—	—	—	—	—	—	—	—	—	Desafiando la gravedad
2009	"Buenas noticias"	—	56	—	20	—	11	13	—	—	1	—	Desafiando la gravedad
2011	"Como un fantasma"	14	—	—	—	—	—	—	—	—	—	—	Como un fantasma (EP)
2013	"Quinta dimensión"	44	—	—	—	—	—	—	—	—	—	—	Otra dirección
2013	"Jurame"	42	—	—	—	—	—	—	—	—	—	—	Otra dirección
2016	"Soy Humana"	—	—	—	—	—	—	—	—	—	—	—	#SoyHumana
2019	"A mi manera"	—	—	—	—	—	—	—	—	—	—	—	Non-album single
2019	"Las chicas buenas" (ft Barei)	—	—	—	—	—	—	—	—	—	—	—	Non-album single
"—" the song did not chart

=== DVDs ===
Year	DVD information	DVD contents
2006	Contigo Donde Estés: Release date: December, 2006; SPA peak: #6; SPA Certification: Gold	Live Concert In Palma de Mallorca; Nada Es Igual Tour Documentary film; Photo Gallery

==== Notes ====
- [*] Current in Chart
