= Grupo Godó =

Spanish media company

Grupo Godó de Comunicación, S.A.
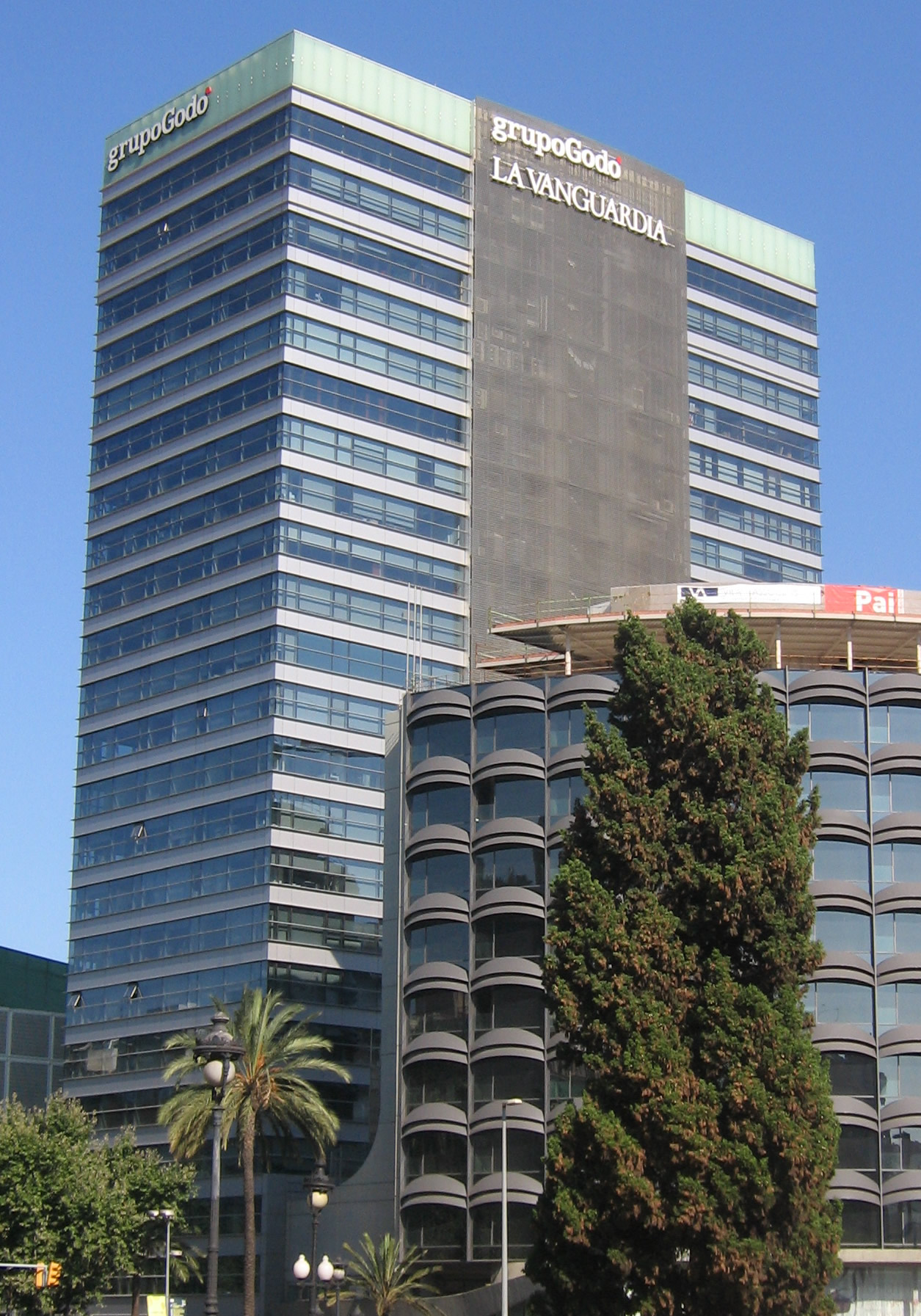
- Current head office
- Type: Sociedad anónima
- Industry: Mass media
- Founded: 31 December 1956
- Headquarters: Torre Godó, Barcelona, Spain
- Key people: Carlos Godó Valls (Chairperson, 2025-)
- Products: Publishing, broadcasting
- Website: www.grupogodo.com

Grupo Godó de Comunicación, S. A., doing business as Grupo Godó, is a Spanish media conglomerate based in Barcelona. Its assets include the daily newspapers La Vanguardia and Mundo Deportivo and the Catalan radio station RAC1.

== History ==
The origins of the group are linked to the Godó family, owners of La Vanguardia since 1887, when textile businessman Carlos Godó bought the newspaper, which had been founded in 1881. During the Francoist dictatorship the newspaper was renamed to La Vanguardia Española. In 1974, Godó became the exclusive owner of Tele/eXprés and the primary shareholder of Mundo Deportivo. Following the death of Franco, La Vanguardia Española embraced a profile both in favour of Catalan autonomism and in defence of the monarchy of Juan Carlos I and returned to its original name.

The Godó family was the primary shareholder behind Antena 3 Radio, launched in 1982, but the radio station was soon absorbed by PRISA. The Godó family was also among the founders of the television channel Antena 3, but their shares in the latter were sold to the Grupo Zeta.

In 2019, Godó sold its participation in the audiovisual production company Veranda (a joint venture with Boomerang TV) to Lagardère Studios. In 2021, the group sold the Catalan TV station 8TV to Nicola Pedrazzoli's GANSO 2022.

== Holdings ==
Newspapers

- La Vanguardia
- Mundo Deportivo

Radio

- RAC1
- RAC105

== See also ==
- Mass media in Spain
