= Duele (Chenoa song) =

Single by Chenoa

from the album Desafiando la gravedad
- Released: 25 July 2009
- Recorded: 2009
- Genre: Latin pop
- Length: 4:29
- Label: Universal Music
- Songwriter(s): Mª Laura Corradini (Chenoa), Yoel Henríquez & Mauricio Gasca
- Producer(s): Mauricio Gasca/Yoel Henriquez

Chenoa minor singles chronology
"Absurda Cenicienta" (2008)	"Duele" (2009)	"Buenas notícias" (2009)

"Duele" ("It Hurts") is the lead single from Chenoa's fifth studio album, Desafiando la gravedad. The single premiered for the first time on July 25, 2009, on Cadena Dial. The digital single was released on August 4, 2009, via iTunes.

== Charts ==
"Duele" debuted at number 41 on the official Spanish Singles Chart by PROMUSICAE. The song peaked at number 14.

Chart	Peak
Spain Top 50 Singles	14
Spain Top 20 Airplay	12

== Release history ==
Region	Date	Label	Format
Spain	July 25, 2009	Universal Music	Radio single
Spain	August 4, 2009	Universal Music	digital download
