= Mundo Deportivo =

Spanish nationwide daily sports newspaper

- Type: National daily sports newspaper
- Format: Tabloid
- Owner: Grupo Godó
- Editor: Santi Nolla
- Founded: 1906; 119 years ago
- Language: Spanish
- Headquarters: Barcelona
- Sister newspapers: La Vanguardia
- Website: mundodeportivo.com

Mundo Deportivo (Spanish pronunciation: [ˈmundo ðepoɾˈtiβo]; (Note: In isolation, Deportivo is pronounced [depoɾˈtiβo].) lit. 'Sports World') is a Spanish nationwide daily sports newspaper published in Barcelona.

== History and profile ==
Mundo Deportivo was first published on 1 February 1906, as a weekly newspaper, and since 1929 daily. It is the oldest sports newspaper still published in Spain, and the second one in Europe, after the Italian La Gazzetta dello Sport which was founded in 1896.

Mundo Deportivo is published in Barcelona by Grupo Godó. The group also owns La Vanguardia. It focuses primarily on the performances of FC Barcelona, but also covers the Spanish basketball league (ACB), Grand Prix motorcycle racing, Formula One car racing, amongst others. Both Mundo Deportivo and Sport are the predominant sources of sports news in Catalonia.

In early July 1999, it introduced a new design format: a more colorful edition, more pages, better photos, a new header, and a name change, omitting the article El from its title. On 15 March 2002, it was subject to a veto by Real Madrid against a journalist from the newspaper due to its editorial line. In 2006, it celebrated its centenary, organizing several events attended by famous athletes (such as Ronaldinho and Pelé) and high-ranking Spanish authorities including the Princes of Asturias, Felipe de Borbón, and Letizia Ortiz.

On 1 February 2009, the website of Mundo Deportivo launched its online archive, where anyone can consult historical sports events since 1906. On 25 March 2011, the website was completely revamped and changed its domain, moving from a .es to a .com, a more global domain.
