= List of Catalan-language radio stations =

Name	Programming	Signal	Coverage
Catalunya Ràdio	General	Digital and analog	Països Catalans
3CatInfo	All-News	Digital and analog	Països Catalans
Catalunya Música	Music	Digital and analog	Països Catalans
iCat FM	Music and cultural	Digital and analog	Països Catalans
Ràdio Flaixbac	Hot AC	Analog	Països Catalans
Flaix FM	Dance/EDM	Analog	Països Catalans
À Punt Ràdio	General	Digital and Analog	Valencian Community
IB3 Ràdio	General	Analog	Balearic Islands
RAC 1	General	Analog	Catalonia
Digital Hits FM	Pop/Rock/Dance	Analog and DVB-T	Catalonia
Antena Catalana Ràdio	Music and general	Digital radio	World
COM Ràdio	General	Analog	Catalonia
Ona Catalana	General	Analog	Catalonia
Ràdio 4	General	Analog	Catalonia
Ràdio Estel	Religious	Analog	Catalonia
RAC 105	Music	Analog	Catalonia
Ràdio Vilamajor	Local	Analog	Sant Antoni de Vilamajor
Xtra FM	Music	Analog	Catalonia
Ràdio Vilablareix	Música en català	Analog	Vilablareix

== See also ==
- List of Catalan-language television channels
