= Chenoa (album) =

Studio album by Chenoa
- Released: April 16, 2002 (Spain)
- Recorded: March–April, 2002 in Miami, Madrid, London, Bratislava and Milan.
- Genres: Pop, R&B, Latin, Dance, Fado
- Length: 52:08
- Labels: Jive/Zomba, Vale Music
- Producers: Carlos Quintero, Mar de Pablos, Brian Rawling, Chris Anderson

Chenoa chronology
Chenoa (2002)	Mis Canciones Favoritas (2003)

Singles from Chenoa
- 1. "Atrévete" Released: April 8, 2002; 2. "Cuando tú vas" Released: June 10, 2002; 3. "Yo te daré" Released: September 16, 2002; 4. "El centro de mi amor" Released: February 20, 2003; 5. "Desnuda frente a ti" Released: April 21, 2003

Chenoa is the debut album from Spanish artist Chenoa, recorded in Miami, Madrid, London, Bratislava and Milan at the months of March and April 2002, after she left the Operación Triunfo academy as the fourth finalist.

The album contains many genres and touches of different music styles including pop, R&B, Latin, dance and fado in the Dulce Pontes' cover of "Cançao do Mar", titled in Spanish "Oye, Mar" ("Listen, Sea"). The album also contains two songs in English, "Love Story" and "Mystify".

Chenoa sold over 500,000 copies in Spain over 61 weeks in Top 100 chart, and she was nominated for the Spanish music industry awards Premios Amigo as best female new artist, and best female artist. Year 2002 finished with a Spanish tour that included more than 70 dates.

== Track listing ==
1. "Yo Te Daré" (Vanesa klein) - 3:06
2. "Atrévete" (Mystify) (Chris Anderson, Debra Andrew) - 3:14
3. "El Centro De Mi Amor" (William Luque) - 3:47
4. "Oye, Mar" (Cançao do Mar) (Joaquim F. Brito, Ferrer Trindade) - 4:50
5. "Love Story" (Par Astron, Bagge Anders, Reed Vertelney) - 3:54
6. "Una Mujer" (I'm a Woman) (Aldo Nova, Reed Vertelney) - 3:53
7. "Cuando Tu Vas" (Luque) - 3:18
8. "Quiero Ser" (Luque, Kiko Velázquez) - 3:22
9. "El Alma En Pie" (with David Bisbal) (José Abraham) - 4:08
10. "El Tiempo Que Me Das" (Alicia Arguiñano, Maribí Etxaniz) - 3:53
11. "Desnuda Frente A Tí" (You Bring out the Best in Me) (Aberg, Rein, Sela) - 3:45
12. "Chicas Solas" (Girls Night Out) (Mehyer, Olafsdottir) - 3:18
13. "Mystify" (Anderson, Andrew) - 3:15

== Personnel ==
- Chris Anderson – Keyboards, Programming, Producer, Dirigida, Realization
- Javier Anguera – Metales
- Alicia Arguiñano – Coros
- Antonio Baglio – Mastering
- Bratislava Symphony Orchestra – Recording
- Gregory Carrero – Guitar, Guitar (Steel)
- Tico Darna – Producer
- Mar DePablos – Producer, Dirigida, Vocal Coach, Realization
- Luis Gómez-Escolar – Adaptation
- Maribí Etxaniz – Coros
- Diego Galaz – Violin, String Score
- Roger "George" González – Production Assistant
- Carlos Guevara – Producer
- Craig Hardy – Programming
- David Hernando – Director
- Paco Ibanez – Metales
- Tiagi Lambert – Make-Up
- Jose Lopez – Production Assistant
- Gary Miller – Programming
- Antonio Miró – Vestuario
- Charlie Noguera – Technician
- Maite Palencia – Producer
- Ramón Pallarés – Metales
- Archie Pena – Percussion, Bateria
- José Puga – Graphic Design
- Carlos Quintero – Arranger, Programming, Producer, Mixing, Dirigida, Vocal Coach, Realization, Recording
- Brian Rawling – Keyboards, Programming, Producer, Mixing, Dirigida, Realization
- Pedro Rodriguez – Mixing, Recording
- Rubendarío – Photography
- Christian Saint Val – Assistant Engineer
- Adrian Schinoff – Arranger, Programming
- Susana Ensin Tarriño – Producer
- Walter Turbitt – Keyboards, Programming, Mixing
- Kiko Velázquez – Arranger, Programming
- Jong Uk Yoon – Assistant Engineer
- Pilar Zamora – Adaptation

== Chart performance ==
Chart	Peak	Weeks On Charts	Certification	Sales
Promusicae	2	61	5× Platinum	500,000+

== Singles ==
Release date	Single	SPA	ARG
April, 2002	Atrévete (Mystify); Produced by Brian Rawling and Chris Andersson.	1	4
June, 2002	Cuando Tu Vas; Produced by Carlos Quintero and Mar de Pablos.	1	14
2002	Yo Te Daré; Produced by Carlos Quintero and Mar de Pablos.	18	Promo
January, 2003	El Centro de Mi Amor; Produced by Carlos Quintero and Mar de Pablos.	28	
April, 2003	Desnuda Frente A Tí; Produced by Brian Rawling and Chris Andersson.	Promo	Promo
