= Nada Es Igual (Chenoa album) =

Studio album by Chenoa
- Released: 13 November 2005 (Spain)
- Recorded: August–October, 2005 in Milan
- Genre: Pop, rock
- Length: 44:42
- Label: Vale Music, Universal Music Spain
- Producer: Dado Parisini

Chenoa chronology
Soy Mujer (2003)	Nada Es Igual (2005)	Absurda Cenicienta (2007)

Professional ratings
Review scores
Source	Rating
AllMusic	4/5 stars

Nada Es Igual (Nothing Is the Same) is the third studio album from Spanish artist Chenoa, recorded in Milan at the summer of 2005 and produced by the prestigious Dado Parisini.

Chenoa's music changed to pop rock for this album. It sold more than 100,000 copies in Spain, and was also a success in many Latin-American countries. The cover art of the album resembles that of Annie Lennox's third studio album Bare.

The first single was "Rutinas" ("Routines"), a pop rock mid-tempo, released in Spain in October 2005 reaching her sixth number 1. The following singles were "Tengo Para Ti" (number 5), and the rock ballad "Donde Estés" only for promotion.

Nada Es Igual is Chenoa's first album without any songs in English, despite some songs have English subtitles.

== Track listing ==
1. "Rutinas (Little Miss Hypocrite)" – 4:10
2. "Tengo Para Ti" – 3:00
3. "Donde Estés..." – 3:33
4. "Nada Es Igual (The Sun Is Going Down)" – 4:10
5. "Camina (Don't Make Me)" – 3:45
6. "Te Encontré" – 4:03
7. "Encadenada a Tí" – 3:26
8. "Me Enamoro Del Dolor (Even When You're With Me)" – 4:00
9. "Ladrón de Corazones" – 3:50
10. "Contigo y Sin Tí" – 4:44
11. "Sol, Noche y Luna" – 6:01
12. "Rutinas" (video clip)
13. "Te Encontré" (multimedia track)
14. Bonus material

== Chart performance ==
Chart	Peak	Certification	Sales
Spanish Albums Chart	6	Platinum	100,000+
Billboard European Top 100 Albums	91		

=== Singles ===
Release date	Single	SPA	PR	LA	MEX	ARG
November 2005	"Rutinas"	1	1	25	100	
April 2006	"Tengo para ti"	5				7
November 2006	"Donde estés"	Promo				

== Nada Es Igual Tour ==
During 2006, Chenoa tour featured concerts across more than 60 cities in Spain. A live DVD called Contigo Donde Estés, filmed at the Plaza de Toros, Mallorca concert, attended by more than 15,000 fans, was released in December 2006.

== Award nominations ==
- Principales Award for Best Spanish Artist of 2006 (Spain, nominated)
- Gardel Award for Best Spanish Pop Album of 2007 (Argentina, nominated)
