= Mis Canciones Favoritas =

Live album by Chenoa
- Released: April 2003
- Recorded: 2003 in Barcelona
- Genre: Pop, Latin pop, R&B, Pop/Rock.
- Label: Jive/Zomba, Vale Music, BMG.

Chenoa chronology
Chenoa (2002)	Mis Canciones Favoritas (2003)	Soy Mujer (2003)

Mis Canciones Favoritas (En Concierto Acústico) is a 2003 unplugged acoustic performance by Spanish musician Chenoa released as an album and DVD.

Recorded in April, 2003 in Barcelona, it included some of her favorite songs, such as: Man in the mirror, Respect, Chain of fools or Love of my life. It was released on a limited edition of 100,000 copies for fans.

== Track listing ==
=== Album ===
1. "Chain of Fools"
2. "El Tiempo Que Me Das"
3. "Maybe This Time"
4. "Love of My Life"
5. "Ain't No Sunshine"
6. "Man in the Mirror"
7. "Cuando Tú Vas"
8. "Desnuda Frente A Ti"
9. "Lía"
10. "Respect"
11. "Killing Me Softly"
12. "El Centro de Mi Amor"

=== DVD ===
1. "Chain of Fools"
2. "El Tiempo Que Me Das"
3. "Maybe This Time"
4. "This Can't Be Love"
5. "Route 66"
6. "Love of My Life"
7. "Ain't No Sunshine"
8. "Man in the Mirror"
9. "Cuando Tú Vas"
10. "Desnuda Frente A Tí"
11. "Lía"
12. "Respect"
13. "Killing Me Softly"
14. "El Centro de Mi Amor"

== Chart performance ==
Chart	Peak	Weeks On Charts	Certification	Sales
Promusicae	4	19	Gold	90,000+
