= Absurda Cenicienta =

Studio album by Chenoa
- Released: 9 October 2007 (Spain)
- Recorded: January–August 2007 in Madrid and Palma de Mallorca
- Genre: Pop, pop rock
- Label: Vale Music, Universal Music Spain
- Producer: Alfonso Samos

Chenoa chronology
Nada es Igual (2005)	Absurda Cenicienta (2007)	Desafiando la gravedad (2009)

Absurda Cenicienta (Absurd Cinderella) is the fourth studio album by the Spanish artist Chenoa. It has been released on October 9, 2007, in Spain. This time, Chenoa has written and/or co-written every single track on the album, that continues with the pop/rock direction started with Nada es Igual.

The album was certified Platinum in Spain, and Gold in Ecuador. It was nominated in the XII Music Awards like Best Pop Album. The lead single Todo Irá Bien won Best Latin Song in the Orgullosamente Latino 2008 awards, that took place in Mexico. With Absurda Cenicienta Chenoa started her international career, and made a huge tour throughout Latin America and United States.

== Track listing ==
1. "Todo Irá Bien"
2. "El bolsillo del Revés"
3. "Absurda Cenicienta" (Shortcut to Heaven)
4. "Sonríeme si eres tú"
5. "Algo de los Dos"
6. "Mucho Rodaje"
7. "Vive tu Vida"
8. "Dieciséis"
9. "Ayúdame"
10. "Cita a Ciegas"
11. "Hola como te va"
12. "Para Sentirte"

== Album chart performance ==
Absurda Cenicienta debuted in the 2nd position in the Spanish album chart, achieving Gold status in its first week due to the 40,000 copies shipped. The album had a good chart run and sold Platinum after many weeks. Absurda Cenicienta topped the charts in Costa Rica for a month, charting in the Top10 for many weeks. In Ecuador, Chenoa's music had a great success (as well as in other Latin American countries). Her singles went straight to the top while the album ended in the 8th position in the Ecuatorian Annual Albums Chart 2008.

Chart	Provider	Peak position	Certification	Sales
Spain	Promusicae	2	Gold	40,000+
Ecuador	Metropoli	8 (annual)	Gold	5,000+
Europe	Billboard	50		

== Single sales ==
Country	Provider	Single	Peak	Certification	Sales
Costa Rica (Digital sales)	EFE	Todo Irá Bien	1		
Mexico (Digital sales)	Tarabú	Todo Irá Bien	3		
iTunes Spain	Apple	Todo Irá Bien	3		
Spain (Digital sales)	Promusicae	Todo Irá Bien	6	2× Platinum	40,000+
Ecuador (Digital sales)	Movistar	Todo Irá Bien	12		

== Singles ==
=== Todo Irá Bien ===
Todo Irá Bien is the first single from the album, the video was shot in a factory from Barcelona in October 2007. In it, Chenoa looks very happy, dancing and flying by moments because of her happiness. The song tries to give a positive message, and was a very successful single in Spain and all Latin America. The song won Best Latin Song category in the Orgullosamente Latino 2008 awards, that took place in Mexico.

=== El bolsillo del revés ===
El bolsillo del revés is the second single from Absurda Cenicienta In Spain, and the third one in Latin America. The music video shows Chenoa dancing and moving into a small flat, criticizing how much cost to buy a flat and to become independent specially for young people. The song had a good airplay specially in Costa Rica in early 2009.

Chart	Peak position
Spain Hot 100	14
Spain Airplay Top 20	16

=== Absurda Cenicienta ===
Absurda Cenicienta (Shortcut to Heaven) is the third single released in Spain, and the second one in America. The single release was followed by a media tour all over America. The video was shot in June 2008 during three days, in a monastery of the Mexico City suburbs, under the direction of Manuel Escalante.

Chart	Peak position
Costa Rica (Los 40)	1
Perú (airplay)	1
Ecuador (airplay)	2
Bolivia (airplay)	2
Guatemala (digital sales)	3
Costa Rica (airplay)	7
Guatemala (airplay)	8
Nicaragua (airplay)	15
Latin America (Top 40)	27
Nicaragua	27
Uruguay	30
El Salvador (airplay)	38
North America (Top 40)	39
America (Top 100)	45
Mexico (Pop 100)	46
México (Top 100 airplay)	77
Chile (Hot 100)	94

=== Volverte a ver ===
Volverte a ver is the original soundtrack and the lead single chosen to promote the film with the same title. The film starred Alfonso Herrera former member of RBD. Chenoa shot the video in November 2008 while the film premiered on 25 December of the same year. The O.S.T was the 5th best selling soundtrack in the Mixup mega stores, and it entered the Mexican Top 100 albums chart.

Chart	Provider	Peak position	Weeks on chart	Certification	Sales
Mexico	Amprofon	63	4	TBA	TBA
