= Jorge Salvador =

Spanish television producer

- Born: Barcelona, Catalonia, Spain
- Years active: 1983-present
- Known for: TV producer and director
- Television: Crónicas marcianas (1997-2004); El Hormiguero (2006); El desafío (2021-)

Jorge Salvador Carulla (born April 1963 in Barcelona) is a Spanish television producer, best known for being the director of El Hormiguero since 2006.

== Career ==
Salvador was born in April 1963 in Barcelona. His radio career started on Antena 3 Radio as a technician in 1983.

He has since directed TV programmes including La cara divertida, Al Ataque and La Parodia Nacional on Antena 3, Crónicas marcianas on Telecinco and Channel n.º 4 on Cuatro. Since 2006 he has been the director of El Hormiguero, on both Cuatro and Antena 3: he appeared as a guest on the show in 2020, where he elaborated on the show's history.

He is also the executive director of the production house 7yAcción, which he founded in 2007 with El Hormiguero host Pablo Motos.

Since 2021 he has been the producer of El desafío, also created by Motos.

== See also ==
- Pablo Motos
- El Hormiguero
