= RAC 1 =

- Spain
- Broadcast area: Spain, Catalonia - Provincial FM & DAB
- Frequencies: FM: 87.7 FM in the Barcelona area. Other frequencies: https://www.rac1.cat/frequencies DAB: Not available yet Digital Terrestrial TV: Under EDC's mux Online: www.rac1.cat

Programming
- Format: News & Speech

Ownership
- Owner: Grupo Godó

History
- First air date: 1 May 2000

Links
- Website: rac1.cat

RAC 1 is the main Catalan language private radio station. It is mainly owned by Grupo Godó and is based in Barcelona. It has a sister radio station, RAC 105, dedicated to chart music.

RAC 1 is a spoken-word radio station, and focuses on news and current affairs, politics, sports and culture. It started broadcasting in 2000 and has been steadily rising in audience ratings to its current 1st position amongst Catalan-language stations.

Its most successful programme Minoria Absoluta, a lunchtime humorous round-up of politics and news is, nowadays, Catalonia's most listened-to radio show. Its most listened-to programme is El món a RAC1. It is the morning magazine of reference in Catalonia. Presented by Jordi Basté, it treats today's news, policy, humor and entertainment. In addition it is the most listened-to radio program in Catalonia.

== Main shows ==
- El món a RAC1
- Minoria Absoluta
- Versió Rac1
- Primer Toc
- Tu diràs

== See also ==
- List of radio stations in Catalan
