= Pablo Motos =

Spanish comedian and broadcaster (born 1965)

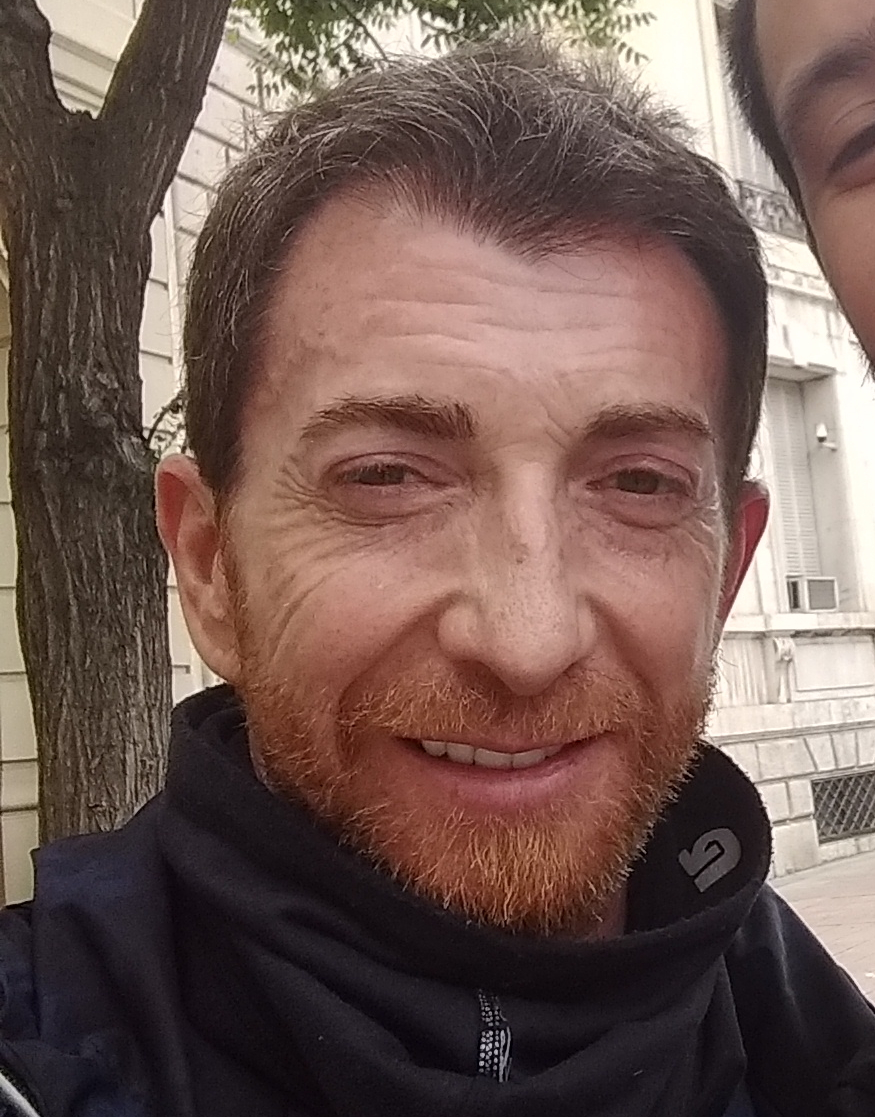
- Pablo Motos in 2018
- Born: Pablo Motos Burgos; 31 August 1965 (age 61); Requena, Valencia, Spain
- Notable work: El hormiguero
- Parent: Amelia Burgos

Comedy career
- Years active: 2002–present
- Medium: Comedian, producer, TV presenter, broadcaster

Pablo Motos Burgos (born 31 August 1965) is a Spanish comedian, scriptwriter and broadcaster who is best known for producing and presenting El Hormiguero, a popular Spanish television show.

== Biography ==
He is the son of Amelia Burgos, who often appeared on El Hormiguero, and who died on 11 December 2018. He did his military service in Ceuta, where he also worked as a receptionist in a military residence.

== Career ==
=== Radio ===
Motos began his media career as a radio host. He later worked at Radio Nacional in Utiel, then Onda Cero Valencia, where he presented and directed programs like Aquí hay más de uno, Mareando la perdiz or Hacia el dos mil, where he has been part of the team as a contributor of La Radio de Julia Otero.

Between September 2002 and 22 June 2007, he presented No somos nadie on M80 Radio in the mornings from Monday to Friday, filling the gap left by the program Gomaespuma with great success. Motos and his team left to concentrate on El Hormiguero, which was now airing episodes Monday through to Thursday.

=== Television ===
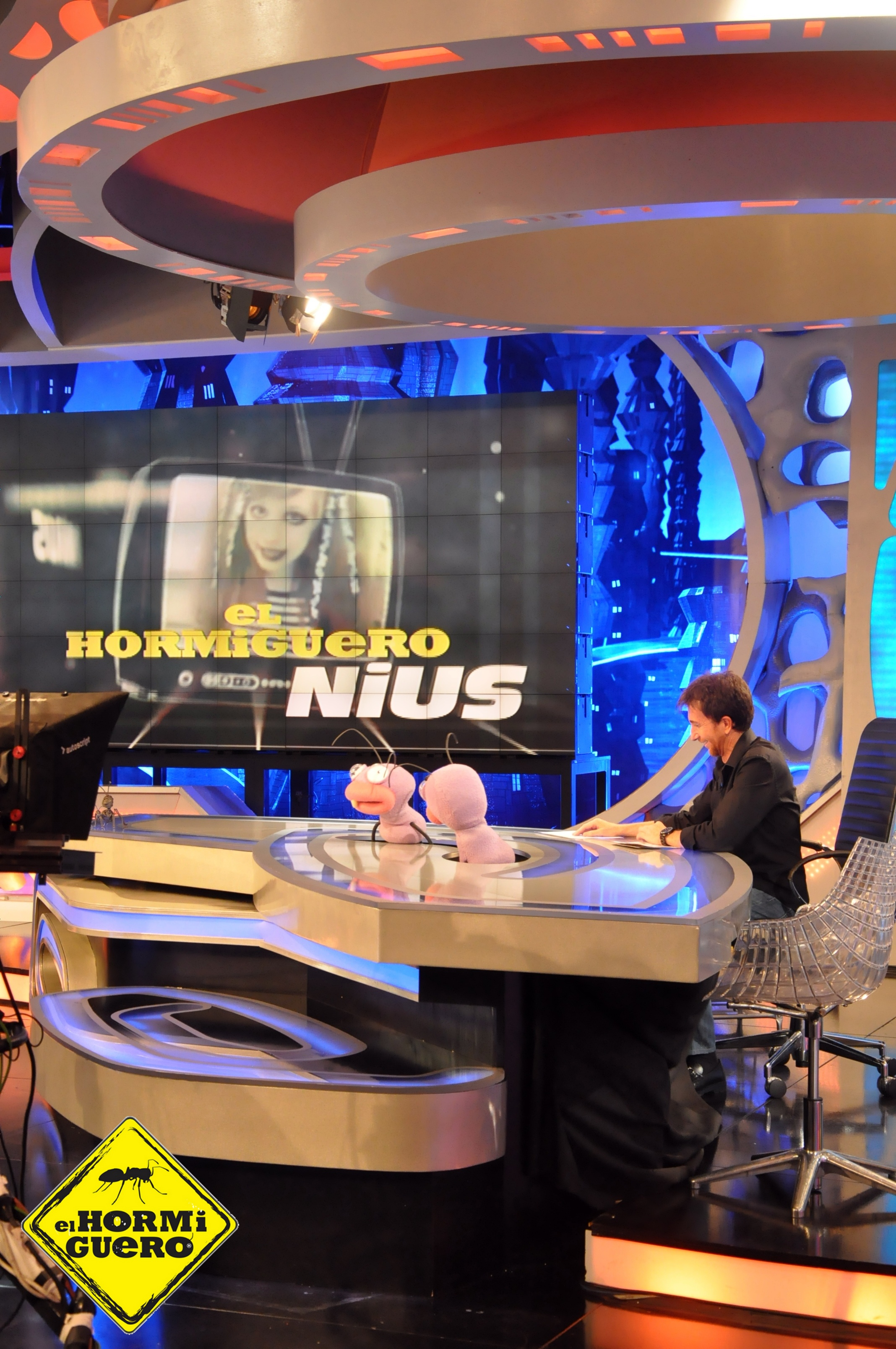
Pablo Motos with ants Trancas and Barrancas on the set of The Ant program for the section "Hormiguero Nius".

On television, he has presented Megacine on Canal Nou, a Valencian regional channel, and was one of the creators of El club de la comedia, writing the scripts for the first three years. At that time he created La noche... con Fuentes y cia, on which he was scriptwriter and executive producer. He also appeared on La hora de José Mota with an appearance as Vincent van Gogh.

From September 2006 until May 2011, he presented and directed El Hormiguero on the general entertainment channel Cuatro. During its first year it was a weekly program that aired on Sunday evening and from September 2007 it aired Monday through Thursday and Saturday night from approximately 21:30 to 22:30. In 2011 it hopped to Antena 3 as El Hormiguero 3.0 and now rarely drops out of the top rated programmes.

In 2007, El Hormiguero's rising popularity allowed him to present the traditional New Year's Eve show on Cuatro together with his ants Trancas and Barrancas. He also appeared to premiere Cuatro's UEFA Euro 2008 football coverage.

=== Music ===
Pablo composed the Benidorm Song Festival 1993 entry "Sabed amigos", performed by Romero y sus amigos, and won. He is credited as co-writer of the lyrics together with Fernando Romero.

He also worked with Asturian singer Melendi on his song Marco, which discusses his son. The profits from the single were donated to the Spanish Federation for Cystic Fibrosis. Melendi also frequently appears as a guest on El Hormiguero.

=== Theatre ===
On stage he has been director of scripts and one of the writers of the Cinco mujeres.com comedy and La vida según San Francisco. He also worked on Verónica Forqué's Spanish remake of The Seven Year Itch, "La tentación vive arriba". He also starred with Enrique San Francisco in Entre fuerte y flojo.

=== Advertising ===
Pablo Motos has also made forays into the world of advertising. He performed in a TV ad for Binaca about bad breath, has been the voice of Coca-Cola, advertised Visa's credit card and advertised Fujitsu's air conditioning. In March 2010 he was the voice of the McDonald's ad. In 2013 he agreed to star in a series of advertisements for Jazztel.

=== Production ===
In 2008, he created his own production company, 7yAcción, together with the producer Jorge Salvador to produce El Hormiguero for Cuatro. In 2008 he created Guerra de sesos for Telecinco and in 2010 he created Tonterias las Justas for Cuatro, in 2011 Otra movida for Neox, and in 2013 Así nos va for LaSexta.

In 2021, he and Jorge Salvador created the successful game show El desafío for Antena 3, based on some of the stunts done on El Hormiguero. Motos performed on the show in its first series, with a cover of Nessun dorma.

=== Film ===
Pablo Motos dubbed the voice of a doll that was stuck in a car for the Spanish version of Toy Story 3. He made a cameo in the film Torrente 4: Lethal Crisis, along with many other Spanish celebrities, and Torrente 5: Operación Eurovegas directed by his friend and frequent El Hormiguero guest Santiago Segura.

== Controversies ==
=== Worst comedian award ===
According to the magazine FHM, through a number of online Internet voting, Pablo Motos was considered the worst comedian on the national scene in 2011.

=== Sexism on El Hormiguero ===
Motos and El Hormiguero have been criticised as misogynist for his and the show's treatment of, and comments regarding, women. In 2022, the Ministry of Equality started a campaign against gender-related violence titled ¿Entonces quién? ('Then Who?'), with one of the ads featuring a male presenter of a spoof of El Hormiguero asking a female guest "And talking of the changing rooms, when you're sleeping, do you wear sexy or comfortable underwear?", a question Motos asked on the show in 2016 to Elsa Pataky. The female guest in the campaign ad says, breaking the fourth wall, "If I were a guy, he wouldn't have asked me that question." Motos took it personally and used the platform of his TV show to criticise that €1 million of public money had been spent on the campaign, and claimed that his question was taken out of context.

== Awards ==
Award	Year	Category	Result	Ref.
Premio del Festival de Benidorm	1993		Won	
Premio Carácter Dewards	2008		Won	
Premio TP de Oro al Mejor Programa	2011		Won	

== Personal life ==
Motos' first marriage in the 1980s ended in divorce. In 2023, Motos talked about his divorce on the show, saying that he experienced "a feeling of liberation" when he ended the marriage, but also felt "a bit of a failure".

He later remarried to Laura Llopis, after they met on Valencian radio. They have been together for over thirty years, and she and Laura and Cristina Correa, her children from a previous relationship, both work on El Hormiguero.
