= Catalunya Ràdio =

Catalan public radio broadcaster

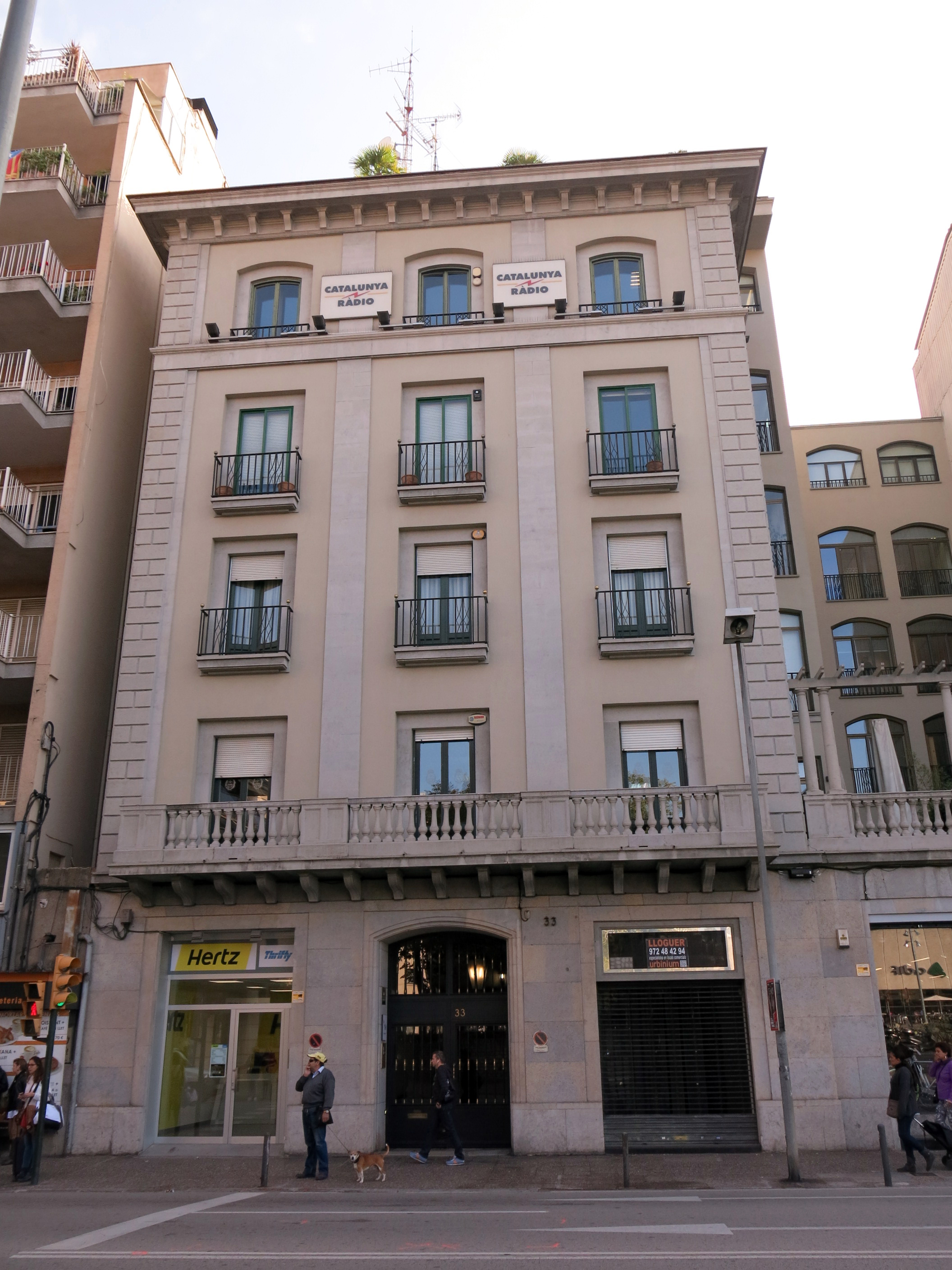
- The Catalunya Ràdio building in Girona
- Type: Public service broadcasting
- Country: Spain
- Broadcast area: Catalonia, Balearic Islands, Andorra, Northern Catalonia; Internationally by satellite.
- Headquarters: Barcelona

Programming
- Language(s): Catalan

Ownership
- Owner: Corporació Catalana de Mitjans Audiovisuals
- Key people: Saül Gordillo i Bernàrdez (Director)

History
- Launch date: 20 June 1983; 43 years ago

Links
- Webcast: Streaming
- Website: Catalunya Ràdio

Catalunya Ràdio (Catalan pronunciation: [kətəˈluɲə ˈraði.u]) is Catalonia's public radio network. With headquarters in Barcelona, it is part of the Corporació Catalana de Mitjans Audiovisuals (CCMA), owned by the Generalitat de Catalunya.

Catalunya Ràdio broadcasts exclusively in Catalan and is the major Catalan-language network today, although Ràdio 4 from Radio Nacional de España (founded in 1976) was the first post-Franco-era station to broadcast in the language.

== Stations ==
Catalunya Ràdio began broadcasting on 20 June 1983. Over the years, it has expanded to encompass four separate stations:

- Catalunya Ràdio – The first station, and the one that gave the network its name. A generalist station that broadcasts 24 hours a day and is the third largest radio station in Catalonia by audience size.
- Catalunya Música – Founded on 10 May 1987, Catalunya Música concentrates on classical and contemporary music, plus specialized music programmes. It broadcasts 24 hours a day.
- 3CatInfo – Created on 11 September 1992, 3CatInfo Ràdio was Spain's first all-news station. It broadcasts 24 hours a day.
- iCat (formerly iCat FM and iCat.cat) – Launched on 23 April 2006, this a multi-media radio station closely linked to the Internet and promoting both traditional and contemporary culture.

Catalunya Ràdio has grown significantly since its inception, and is currently available in Catalonia, Valencia, the Balearic Islands, Northern Catalonia, La Franja, and Andorra.

Catalunya Ràdio logos

=== Former stations ===
- RAC 105 – Station dedicated to musical successes; first broadcast February 15, 1984. It was born with the name of RAC (Ràdio Associació de Catalunya) in 1984. It ceased to be part of the CCRTV in 1998.
- Catalunya Cultura – Cultural station with varied topics. Broadcast from February 2, 1999 to April 23, 2006. It was replaced by iCat.
- CatClàssica – A station dedicated to classical music by Catalan authors. Broadcast from February 18, 2008 to 2019.

== Main programs ==
=== Catalunya Ràdio ===
Programs here is dedicated to news, magazines and entertainment.

- Alguna pregunta més?
- Amb mal peu
- Catalunya Migdia
- Catalunya Vespre
- El Cafè de la República
- El lloro, el moro, el mico i el senyor de Puerto Rico
- El matí de Josep Cuní
- El suplement
- Els optimistes
- En guàrdia
- Generació digital
- L'internauta
- L'ofici de viure
- L'orquestra
- La transmissió d'en Puyal
- La tribu de Catalunya Ràdio
- El matí de Catalunya Ràdio
- Les mil i una nits de Maria de la Pau Janer
- La nit dels ignorants
- El secret
- Tarda Tardà
- Tot gira
- Els viatgers de la Gran Anaconda

=== 3CatInfo Ràdio ===
As Spain's first all-news station, 3CatInfo has a strong focus on local news, traffic, weather and information. News bulletins is aired around the clock. At the half past, the station will summary what have been said in 30 minutes ago and what will be said in 30 minutes next. At :33, 3CatInfo tells listeners the day's three most important news, also local traffic updates from Catalunya Transit Service and the latest weather forecasts for the coming hours at :15 and :45. Weather summaries can also be heard during the headlines.

The station's hourly news block is as follows:

- at :00 – Headlines
- at :03 – News
- at :15 – Traffic and Weather
- at :18 – News
- at :25 – Sports
- at :30 – Summary and content next half-hour
- at :33 – The day's three most important news
- at :40 – Details of the day's three most important news, plus news that wasn't told at :00
- at :45 – Traffic and Weather
- at :48 – News
- at :55 – Sports

Traffic updates are only broadcast between 6:30 and 22:30 (also on headlines during rush hours). This 60-minute format has been used since 7 April 2015, at 12:00. When a local event is happening, the station will interrupt this news wheel to provide continuous coverage of that event.

=== Catalunya Música ===
Catalunya Música is focused on local songs, music festivals, and music historical sites.

- Preludi
- Tonalitats
- La setmana de...
- Els concerts
- Només hi faltes tu
- Notes de clàssica
- Els gustos reunits
- Guia d'orquestra
- El violí vermell
- El Gran Segle
- Una tarda a l'òpera
- Qui té por del segle XX?
- Espais Oberts
- Via Jazz
- Històries de l'òpera
- Solistes
- Blog de nit

=== iCat ===
Here, with music, it also keeps a watchful eye on culture. This station previously operated a number of specialized, online-only, sister stations: TotCat (local music), MusiCatles which was replaced by iCat Món (world music), Mediterràdio (Mediterranean music and culture), iCat Jazz (jazz), iCat Rumba (Catalan rumba), iCat Trònica (electronic music) and Xahrazad (female voices).

== See also ==
- List of radio stations in Catalan
- RAC 1
