= El Hormiguero =

Spanish comedy television program

- Genre: Talk show Puppet Show; Comedy; Variety
- Presented by: Pablo Motos
- Opening theme: "El Hormiguero Cuatro Instrumental" (2006–2011) "El Hormiguero 3.0 Instrumental" (2011–present)
- Ending theme: "Vete a dormir" (2007–2010) "Vete a dormir Instrumental" (2010–2011) "El Hormiguero 3.0 Instrumental" (2011–present)
- Country of origin: Spain
- Original language: Spanish
- No. of seasons: 20
- No. of episodes: 3128

Production
- Producers: Gestmusic (2006–2008); 7yAcción (2008–present)
- Production locations: Madrid, Spain
- Running time: 120 minutes (2006–2007); 50 minutes (2007–present)

Original release
- Network: Cuatro
- Release: 24 September 2006 – 30 June 2011
- Network: Antena 3
- Release: 5 September 2011 – present

Related
- Peliculeros

El Hormiguero (pronounced [el oɾmiˈɣeɾo]; Spanish for "The Anthill") is a Spanish television program with a live audience focusing on comedy, science, and guest interviews airing since September 2006. It is hosted and produced by screenwriter Pablo Motos.

The show aired on Spain's Cuatro channel from launch until June 2011, when it switched to Antena 3. It has proved a ratings success, and has expanded from a weekly 120-minute show to a daily 40-minute show in its third season, which began on 17 September 2007.

Recurring guests on the show include Luis Piedrahita, Raquel Martos, Marrón & El Hombre de Negro ("The Man in Black"; the scientists), and puppet ants Trancas and Barrancas (from the Spanish expression a trancas y barrancas, which means "in fits and starts").

The first series was produced by Gestmusic, the Spanish venture of Endemol. Since the second series it has been produced by 7yAcción, a production company formed by Motos and the show's director Jorge Salvador. On a Cadena SER interview, he revealed that he had once been offered to take the show to Telecinco, but he preferred to stay with Cuatro. He eventually accepted an offer to move to Antena 3, when Mediaset España refused to meet the €90,000 per episode fee that 7yAcción proposed.

The show won the Entertainment prize at the 2009 Rose d'Or ceremony, and led the ratings in its timeslot continuously from 2014 until 2024.

In 2026, Trancas and Barrancas participated in the Antena 3 television show Mask Singer: Adivina quién canta, under the masks of Flip-flops.

== Format ==
The show is based on an earlier radio program, broadcast on M80 Radio, called No Somos Nadie ("We Are Nobody"). This show continued until June 2007, when Pablo Motos announced that he would be leaving the program to allow the daily production of El Hormiguero. No Somos Nadie returned in September 2007 with new on-air talent, since most of the old show's talent were part of the television adaptation.

Barrancas (left) and Trancas (right) sing along with the show's rap

Segments on the show included scientific experiments, like a car running on vegetable oil, hangover cures, a superconductivity demonstration, and various chemical reaction demonstrations. Each episode features a satirical rap, commentary on current events, and humorous phrases as spoken by children. Other segments include pitches for viewers to plant trees and "El Kiosco", a section of magazine reviews. The show also airs parodies of other media, which have included Back to the Future, Pop Idol, House M.D., and Mission: Impossible. Each episode features a celebrity guest, including Boris Izaguirre, David Bisbal, Alejandro Sanz, Paulina Rubio, Dani Martin, Nuria Roca and numerous international celebrities such as Miley Cyrus, Sergio Dalma, Ashley Tisdale or Hugh Jackman.

== International attention ==
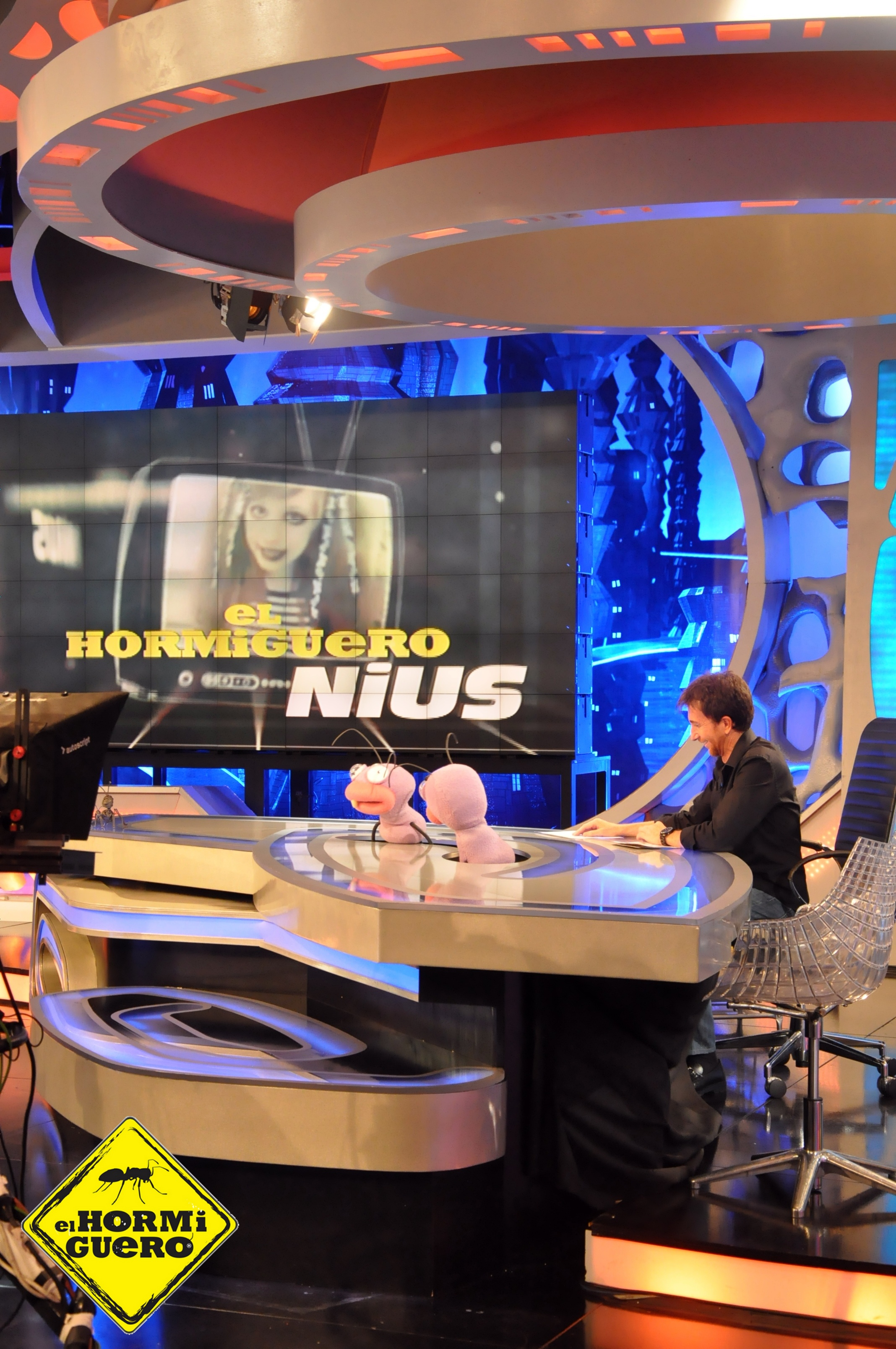
Pablo Motos presenting at El Hormiguero

The show first received international attention in 2006 for having people walk across a swimming pool filled with a non-Newtonian fluid, a suspension of cornstarch and water called oobleck, that was mixed in a cement truck. This experiment was performed in an October 2006 episode of the show and was repeated with a new batch of oobleck on the Christmas Eve special episode due to its popularity. In 2007, Cuatro signed an agreement with YouTube that allows clips from Cuatro programs, including El Hormiguero, to be showcased on the site. In 2009, El Hormiguero was awarded as the best entertainment program in the international Rose d'Or awards. The win was the fourth time a Spanish program has received the award, the first since 1994.

Since 2008, the show has received a large number of appearances from international celebrities. (Note: Celebrities include: Batista (Rey Mysterio was interviewed by El Hormiguero´s ants in the USA) from WWE, sportsmen Dwight Howard, Sergio Ramos, Iñaki Williams, Diego Simeone, Marcelo, Sergio Agüero, Ronaldo, Baptista and Roberto Carlos, Rudy Fernández, Ilia Topuria, Carlos Sainz, Carlos Sainz Jr., Novak Djokovic, Fernando Alonso, Roberto Bautista and Rafa Nadal, Carlos Alcaraz motorcycle Toni Elías, Jorge Lorenzo, Joan Mir, Marc Marquez and Alex Marquez, swimmer Ona Carbonell, gymnast Simone Biles, the politicians Albert Rivera, Mariano Rajoy, Pablo Iglesias, Pedro Sánchez and Miguel Angel Revilla, writer Dan Brown the models Cara Delevingne, Sara Sampaio, Jean Paul Gaultier, Karlie Kloss, Alessandra Ambrosio, Heidi Klum, Elle Macpherson and Adriana Karembeu, the astronaut Charles Duke, the writer Dan Brown, the dog trainer Cesar Millan, actors Will Smith, Jaden Smith, Jada Pinkett Smith, Jackie Chan, Margot Robbie, Mena Massoud, Naomi Scott, Martin Lawrence; Lost stars Matthew Fox and Jorge Garcia; House M.D. stars Olivia Wilde and Lisa Edelstein; Hugh Jackman, Rob Schneider, Matt Dallas, Sylvester Stallone, Hugh Grant, Michael C. Hall, Jean Reno, Jason Biggs, Seann William Scott, Geraldine, Oona Castilla Chaplin, Johnny Knoxville, Tom Cruise, Annabelle Wallis, Sofia Boutella, Emily Blunt, Ana de Armas, Cameron Diaz, Nikolaj Coster-Waldau, Gary Dourdan, Eva Mendes, Jennifer Connelly, Steve Carell, Kristen Wiig, Tim Burton, Jamie Lee Curtis Charlize Theron, Kristen Stewart, Robert Pattinson, Taylor Lautner, Zoe Kravitz, Clive Owen, Sofia Vergara, Alec Baldwin, Mckenna Grace, Sam Heughan, Ricardo Darín, Elisabeth Moss, Jamie Bell, Reese Witherspoon, Laura Natalia Esquivel, Robert Englund, Aaron Taylor-Johnson Danny DeVito, Rami Malek, Mark Wahlberg, Ben Affleck, Oscar Isaac, Christopher Lloyd, Norman Reedus, Jeffrey Dean Morgan, Jennifer Aniston, Guillermo Francella, Diego Luna, Denzel Washington, Daniel Craig, Kelsey Grammer, Dolph Lundgren, Jeremy Irons, Freddie Highmore, Ryan Reynolds, Richard Gere, Patrick Dempsey, Vincent Cassel, Valentina Zenere, Daniel Radcliffe, Rupert Grint, the Phelps twins, Eddie Redmayne, Liam Neeson, Callum Turner, Russell Crowe, Dwayne Johnson, Kevin Hart, Esmeralda Pimentel, Oscar Jaenada, Mario Casas, Amaia Salamanca, Blanca Suarez, Jose Coronado, Isaac Hempstead Wright, Liam Cunningham, Liam Hemsworth, Josh Hutcherson and Jennifer Lawrence, William Levy, Jeremy Allen White, Olivia Munn, Boyd Holbrook, China Suarez, Benicio del Toro, Tim Robbins, Jessica Chastain, Adriana Karembeu, Ed Harris, Jake Gyllenhaal, Yahya Abdul-Mateen II, Kelsey Grammer, Matthew McConaughey, Woody Allen, Ernesto Alterio, Peter Coyote, Nicole Kidman, Elsa Pataky, Marvel Cinematic Universe stars Chris Hemsworth, Paul Rudd, Benedict Cumberbatch, Anthony Mackie, Danny Ramirez, Chris Pratt and Bradley Cooper, Tom Holland, Zendaya, Gwyneth Paltrow, Debi Mazar, Patrick Stewart, Bryan Cranston, Peter Dinklage, Alex Pettyfer and Teresa Palmer, Brigitte Nielsen, Channing Tatum, Eva Longoria, Orlando Bloom, Vin Diesel, Dakota Johnson, Sofía Vergara, Leo Bassi, Kennet Branagh, Richard Madden, Willem Dafoe, Sigourney Weaver, Martin Sheen, Emilio Estevez, Ed Skrein, Mel Gibson, Johnny Depp, Riccardo Scamarcio, David Hasselhoff, Elijah Wood, Sasha Grey, Tom Hanks, Mariana Treviño, Bill Murray, Sharon Stone, Harrison Ford, Drew Barrymore, Timothy Olyphant, Stranger Things stars David Harbour, Millie Bobby Brown, Noah Schnapp and Finn Wolfhard, Óscar Martínez, Penelope Cruz, Pedro Almodóvar, Antonio Banderas, Salma Hayek, Rowan Atkinson, Amanda Seyfried, Lorenzo Lamas, Emma Stone, Andrew Garfield, Jesse Eisenberg and Justin Timberlake, singers Jonas Brothers, Enrique Iglesias, Backstreet Boys, McFly, Tokio Hotel, One Direction, Bizarrap, David Bisbal, Álvaro Soler, India Martinez, La Oreja De Van Gogh, Carlos Baute, Kylie Minogue, Alejandro Sanz, Shakira, Alesha Dixon, Ashley Tisdale, Ke$ha, Iggy Pop, Anastacia, Chayanne, Isabel Pantoja, Emilia de Poret, Julieta Venegas, Norah Jones, Pablo Alboran, Camilo, Ava Max, Eros Ramazzotti, Monica Naranjo, Chris Isaak, Anitta, Salvador Sobral, Rosalía, Milow, Craig David, Emeli Sandé, Fleur East, Cecilia Bartoli, Michel Teló, Lang Lang, Miguel Bosé, Carlos Vives, Amaia Montero, David Summers (Hombres G), Jason Derulo, Kate Ryan, Ricky Martin, Austin Mahone, La Quinta Estacion, Tini, Danna Paola, Alicia Keys, Pitbull, Belinda, David Guetta, Raffaella Carrà, Carla Bruni, Bob Sinclar, Ella Baila Sola, James Blunt, Meghan Trainor, Raphael, Sebastian Yatra, Ed Sheeran, Lali Esposito, Billy Ray Cyrus, Pimpinela, Luis Fonsi, Melendi, Emilia, Robbie Williams, María Becerra, Juanes, Manuel Turizo, Jeanette, Nathy Peluso, Sergio Dalma, Gloria Estefan, Maná, Gloria Gaynor, The Baseballs, Juan Luis Guerra, Nelly Furtado, Lele Pons, Guaynaa, Lenny Kravitz, Duffy, 30 Seconds to Mars members Jared Leto; Taylor Swift, Romeo Santos, Andres Calamaro, La Toya Jackson, Carlos Santana, Michael Buble, LMFAO, Laura Pausini, Mika, Christopher Cross, Jose Luis Perales, Karol G, Jamie Cullum, Paulina Rubio, Carly Rae Jepsen, 80s singers Rick Astley, Spandau Ballet, Bonnie Tyler and Ana Torroja, reggaeton and trap singers Daddy Yankee, Maluma, Eladio Carrión, Ozuna, Rauw Alejandro, Young Miko Myke Towers, Feid, Duki, Nicky Jam and J Balvin productor music Manuel Alejandro young actors Dafne Keen, Julio Peña and Clara Galle singers Vanessa Hudgens, Selena Gomez, Alfred Garcia, Lola Indigo, Nicki Nicole, Ana Mena, Becky G, Ana Guerra, Aitana, Justin Bieber and Miley Cyrus and comedias Adam Sandler, Frat Pack Members Ben Stiller, Owen Wilson and Will Ferrell, Santiago Segura, Florentino Fernández, José Mota, Sacha Baron Cohen.)

In addition, sometimes, Pablo Motos has travelled to other countries to interview notable people there. This was the case in Motos' interviews with Hugh Laurie (in Los Angeles), to Rey Misterio (in the United States) or Will and Jaden Smith (in their fourth and second interviews with Motos, respectively; in London). The programme has also interviewed Will Smith with Margot Robbie.

After Jesse Eisenberg spoke negatively about his experience as guest on El Hormiguero, in an interview with Conan O'Brien on TBS's Conan, Pablo Motos gave a humorous retort to the actor and the American talk-show host from the Spanish program.

In 2009, Siete y Acción licensed the show's format to Grundy Italy, an Italian production company, to produce a local version of the show, but its pilot in the original format was never picked up. Also in 2009, Chilean and Portuguese versions were produced: in Chile the show flopped and was axed within a month; the Portuguese version ran successfully until 2013 in various timeslots on SIC. In June 2010 the Mexican version of the show premiered: it was produced for two series but was unexpectedly cancelled during its second series as a cost-cutting measure by TV Azteca. The Brazilian version premiered ten days afterwards, but was axed within a year. In 2013 there was an attempt by Will Smith to move the format to the United States, showing interest in the NBC or CBS networks, but it did not materialise. The programme has also been adapted successfully in China by Hunan Television (though it has been suggested by producers that the local network haven't paid for the rights). According to producers 7yAcción, the programme has been piloted additionally in Argentina, Colombia, Germany and Romania. The show is broadcast in the US by Spanish-language channel Estrella TV.

In 2024, it was announced that Italia 1 would remake the show in Italy as Il Formicaio.

Country	Name	Presenter	Channel	Dates
Brazil	O Formigueiro	Marco Luque	Rede Bandeirantes	25 July - 16 December 2010
Chile	El Hormiguero	Tonka Tomicic Sergio Lagos	Canal 13	3 - 31 January 2010
China (unlicensed)	啊啊啊科学实验站 (A a a kēxué shíyàn zhàn)	?	Hunan Television	2014 - 2016
Italy	Il Formicaio	TBA	Italia 1	2025
Mexico	El Hormiguero MX	Mauricio Mancera	Azteca 7	15 July 2014 - 27 May 2015
Portugal	O Formigueiro	Marco Horácio	SIC	23 December 2009 - 2013
Romania	Furnicuțele	Current; Cătălin Măruță (2–) Former; Denise Rifai (1)	Antena 1	20 April 2026 – present
Spain (original version)	El Hormiguero	Pablo Motos	Cuatro (2006–11)	24 September 2006 - 30 June 2011
Spain (original version)	El Hormiguero	Pablo Motos	Antena 3 (2011-)	5 September 2011 – present

== Cast ==
- Pablo Motos – Himself – Host
- Juan Ibáñez Pérez – Himself – Trancas Petancas
- Damián Mollá Hermán – Himself – Barrancas
- Pablo Ibáñez Pérez – El Hombre de Negro (The Man in Black). He left the program in March 2017.
- Enrique Pérez Vergara – "Flipy", El científico loco (The Mad Scientist) (Until 5th season)
- Jandro – Super-Fan, El experto en todo (The expert in everything) and Contador de chistes con carteles (Jokes with posters) (5th season)
- Mario Vaquerizo – Himself
- Raquel Martos González – Herself
- Luis Piedrahita – El rey de las cosas pequeñas (The King of Little Things) and "Mago que revela sus propios trucos" (Magician that reveals his own tricks) (5th season)
- Jorge Marrón Martín – El Maestro Empanao (The Dumbass Master), "El efecto mariposa" (The Butterfly effect), "El científico" (5th Season, The Scientist)
- Yibing: She first appeared on 24 January 2017, and she shows the curiosities of China. She replaces Anna Simon after her absence.
- Mónica Cruz: She participates in the 12th edition of the programme. Her section is called Mónica cool, where she teaches how to survive the latest trends.
- Juan Del Val
- Cristina Pardo: Her section is called Podría ser peor and tertulia
- Joaquín Sánchez
- Cristina Pedroche
- Antonio Resines: His section is called "El juez Resines".

== Episodes ==
Series	Channel	Episodes	Start	End	Audience		Highest-rated				Lowest-rated			
Series	Channel	Episodes	Start	End	Viewers	Share	Date	Guest	Viewers	Share	Date	Guest	Viewers	Share
1	Cuatro	35	24/09/2006	03/06/2007	1,127,000	9.7%								
2	Cuatro	152	17/09/2007	09/06/2008	1,747,000	9.7%								
3	Cuatro	201	01/09/2008	29/06/2009	1,988,000	11%								
4	Cuatro	169	31/08/2009	07/07/2010	1,610,000	8.7%								
5	Cuatro	164	26/08/2010	30/06/2011	1,517,000	8.1%								
6	Antena 3	180	05/09/2011	12/07/2012	2,199,000	11.3%								
7	Antena 3	185	03/09/2012	04/07/2013	2,254,000	11.2%								
8	Antena 3	160	02/09/2013	17/07/2014	2,451,000	12.8%	20/01/2014	Adriana Ugarte & Peter Vives	3,560,000	16.4%				
9	Antena 3	162	01/09/2014	09/07/2015	2,609,000	13.5%	07/04/2015	Isabel Preysler	3,855,000	19.4%				
10	Antena 3	157	31/08/2015	11/07/2016	2,887,000	15.4%	06/11/2015	Bertín Osborne	4,172,000	20.4%				
11	Antena 3	154	05/09/2016	05/07/2017	2,696,000	14.8%	30/01/2017	Isabel Pantoja	4,783,000	23.8%				
12	Antena 3	161	04/09/2017	05/07/2018	2,783,000	15.0%	26/02/2018	Amaia & Alfred	3,983,000	19.4%				
13	Antena 3	163	03/09/2018	03/07/2019	2,561,000	14.7%	04/02/2019	Sergio Ramos	3,777,000	19.7%				
14	Antena 3	162	02/09/2019	02/07/2020	3,906,000	14.5%	10/10/2019	Santiago Abascal	4,049,000	23.5%				
15	Antena 3	161	07/09/2020	12/07/2021	2,714,000	15.5%	02/02/2021	Susanna Griso	3,891,000	21.6%	24/09/2020	Fernando Alonso	2,101,000	13.3%
16	Antena 3	161	06/09/2021	04/07/2022	2,431,000	15.6%	09/11/2021	Isabel Díaz Ayuso	3,588,000	23.2%	11/10/2021	Begoña Vargas	1,671,000	11.9%
17	Antena 3	161	05/09/2022	03/07/2023	2,407,000	16,8%	28/06/2023	Alberto Núñez Feijóo	3,079,000	25.9%	15/06/2023	Clara Galle & Julio Peña	1,665,000	11.9%
18	Antena 3	161	04/09/2023	01/07/2024	2,100,000	15,7%	15/05/2024	Óscar Díaz & Moisés Laguardia	2,911,000	21.9%	24/06/2024	Leticia Sabater	979,000	6.6%
19	Antena 3	161	02/09/2024	01/07/2025	1 974 000	15,2 %	12/09/2024	Lamine Yamal	3,107,000	23.3%	28/04/2025	Juan y Medio	1,368,000	17.0%
20	Antena 3	161	01/09/2025	01/07/2026	1 740 000	14,2%	01/09/2025	Bertín Osborne & Sergio Ramos	2,347,000	21.1%	11/06/2026	María del Monte	1,233,000	9.9%
21	Antena 3	TBA	07/09/2026	TBA			11/11/2026	Alberto Núñez Feijóo	2,455,000	19.0%	09/11/2026	Macarena Gómez	1,242,000	8.3%
Total		2.527	24 September 2006											

== Controversies ==
=== Decapitation simulation ===
During the 25 October 2011 edition of El Hormiguero, singer Dani Martín, who was the guest on that episode, took part in a staged magic trick in which he appeared to be accidentally decapitated by a guillotine. As part of the prank, host Pablo Motos was heard shouting at the cameraman to stop recording moments before the programme cut to a commercial break. After returning from the break, Motos stated that a problem had occurred and that further explanations would be given in the next episode, ending the broadcast on an alarming note.

The fake decapitation generated widespread controversy online, with reactions divided between viewers who supported the prank and those who expressed outrage over the incident. Following the backlash, the production team of El Hormiguero publicly apologised for failing to clarify the situation before the end of the broadcast.

=== Accusations of sexism ===
Pablo Motos and El Hormiguero have frequently been criticised for alleged sexist behaviour. In 2022, a campaign by the Ministry of Equality aimed at combating gender violence highlighted a question asked by Motos to actress Elsa Pataky during a 2016 interview: "When you sleep, is your underwear sexy or comfortable?".

Motos responded by stating that Pataky had appeared on the programme to promote a lingerie and sleepwear campaign, and accused the Ministry of Equality of misrepresenting the context. He also argued that similar questions had been asked to male guests including Sergio Dalma, Maluma, Miguel Ángel Silvestre, Pablo Chiapella and Sergio Ramos. He further criticised the campaign's public cost and stated that he considered feminism "necessary" and "a social movement, not belonging to any political party".

Following his response, social media users circulated clips from past episodes of El Hormiguero that they described as sexist or inappropriate towards female guests. According to the newspaper Público and various users on social media platforms, the programme's production company allegedly attempted to remove some of the videos online, which led to increased dissemination of similar clips in what several commentators described as the Streisand effect.

Among the excerpts widely shared online was a 2009 interview with actress Ana de Armas, in which Motos commented on her physical appearance and asked questions about sex scenes and remarks she had previously made regarding her body. Another frequently cited interview involved singer Virginia Maestro, who later described her experience on the programme as "sexist, violent, uncomfortable, tacky, embarrassing and regrettable".

Motos also faced criticism for comments directed at journalist Mónica Carrillo, model Alessandra Ambrosio and singer Mónica Naranjo, among others. Satirical magazine El Jueves criticised the presenter in a 2017 cover illustration titled "Rancidity for the whole family", portraying him as a slug making inappropriate remarks to a female guest. Interviews with singer Anastacia and actresses Blanca Suárez, Ana Fernández, Nadia de Santiago and Maggie Civantos also generated controversy for questions and comments considered sexist by critics.

During the 10 February 2026 broadcast of the programme, contributor Rosa Belmonte made a comment about political commentator Sarah Santaolalla that was criticised by organisations including the Institute of Women as sexist and offensive. In the following episode, Motos apologised on air, describing the remark as "unfortunate" and acknowledging that the programme "made a mistake". Belmonte also apologised on social media, stating that the comment had been spontaneous and not intended to offend.

=== Political criticism ===
In later years, El Hormiguero was criticised for evolving from a family-oriented entertainment programme into one featuring extensive political commentary. Critics noted that the show increasingly adapted its format to current political events, such as dedicating more than half of a 2024 broadcast to discussing prime minister Pedro Sánchez's decision not to resign. In 2023, PSOE communications director Ion Antolín wrote on Twitter: "The funny ants turned into scorpions. A family programme became a magma of Trumpism in prime time".

The programme's political discussion segment began in 2020 during the COVID-19 pandemic, at a time when Spain was governed by a left-wing coalition led by Sánchez. The segment was frequently criticised for an alleged lack of ideological pluralism and for its repeated criticism of the government of Spain. One of its most controversial contributors was writer and commentator Juan del Val, who accused the government of Spain of orchestrating campaigns against the programme following controversy surrounding an interview with actress Sofía Vergara. Del Val claimed that "Moncloa creates the strategy" to discredit the show and its presenter, Pablo Motos. The programme was also criticised because all of the participants in its political panel were perceived as politically right-wing.

In 2019, the programme invited Santiago Abascal, leader of the far-right political party Vox, for an interview during the pre-campaign period of the November general election. Several commentators criticised the decision, arguing that it contributed to the normalisation of the far-right in Spanish media.

In 2024, actress Mónica López publicly criticised Motos and refused to appear on the programme, accusing him of "whitewashing fascism" and stating that "people from the cultural world should not go on El Hormiguero". She later apologised for the tone of her remarks and for mentioning actor Javier Cámara in her criticism.

In 2023, Motos complained about what he described as restrictions on freedom of expression due to criticism directed at him and the programme. His remarks prompted responses from commentators and social media users who argued that, as host of a prime-time television show with millions of viewers, he already possessed a significant public platform. Among the most widely shared responses was one by TikTok creator Marta Llanos, who argued that Motos was not losing freedom of expression, but rather facing public disagreement and criticism for his opinions.

That same year, comments made on the programme by former deputy prime minister Alfonso Guerra regarding "censorship" and "political correctness" also generated controversy. Guerra lamented that comedians "can no longer joke about anything", to which Motos responded that many comedians now spent more time discussing topics they supposedly could not joke about than actually telling jokes.

Several comedians and satirists, including Facu Díaz, Kike García and illustrator Raúl Salazar, publicly accused Motos's production company of pressuring performers and publications to remove jokes about the presenter. Díaz stated that Motos was "obsessed with his public image" and unwilling to tolerate jokes directed at him. Politician Javier Padilla similarly claimed that he had received communications from Motos's agency after criticising the type of masculinity he believed the presenter represented.

=== La Revuelta controversy ===
Comedian David Broncano often gained social media attention for his show The Resistance on pay-per-view network Movistar Plus+ by attacking El Hormiguero for its perceived bias. While Broncano never threatened the show's success, due to being aired much later and on a pay TV channel, in 2024 Broncano swapped to TVE to launch a similar show called La revuelta, which competed in the ratings directly against El Hormiguero. Broncano's show was a success, and beat El Hormiguero, which had led the timeslot for ten straight years, in the ratings on its second day on air.

El Hormiguero and La revuelta often exchanged tit-for-tat insults, with collaborator Juan del Val on El Hormiguero, a show perceived to have a right-wing political leaning, suggesting that Prime Minister Pedro Sánchez had chosen Broncano to counter EH's leadership in the ratings, saying "the problem is not Broncano, the problem is that La Moncloa wants to end Pablo Motos".

On 21 November 2024, David Broncano announced that he would not be able to interview that day's guest, 2024 MotoGP World Championship champion Jorge Martín, who was already in the programme's dressing room, because he had been pressured to go on El Hormiguero first. Due to being unable to broadcast the interview with Martín (which was shot nonetheless, but later lost) on that date, La revuelta chose to air twelve minutes of dialogue-free footage from a documentary on the bellow of a deer instead. Pablo Motos claimed that it was "a misunderstanding" and that the controversy was an example of "journalistic malpractice".

In 2025, El Hormiguero conclusively regained its leadership of the ratings ahead of Broncano's show.
