= Platino Awards =

Ibero-American annual film award ceremony

- Current: 13th Platino Awards
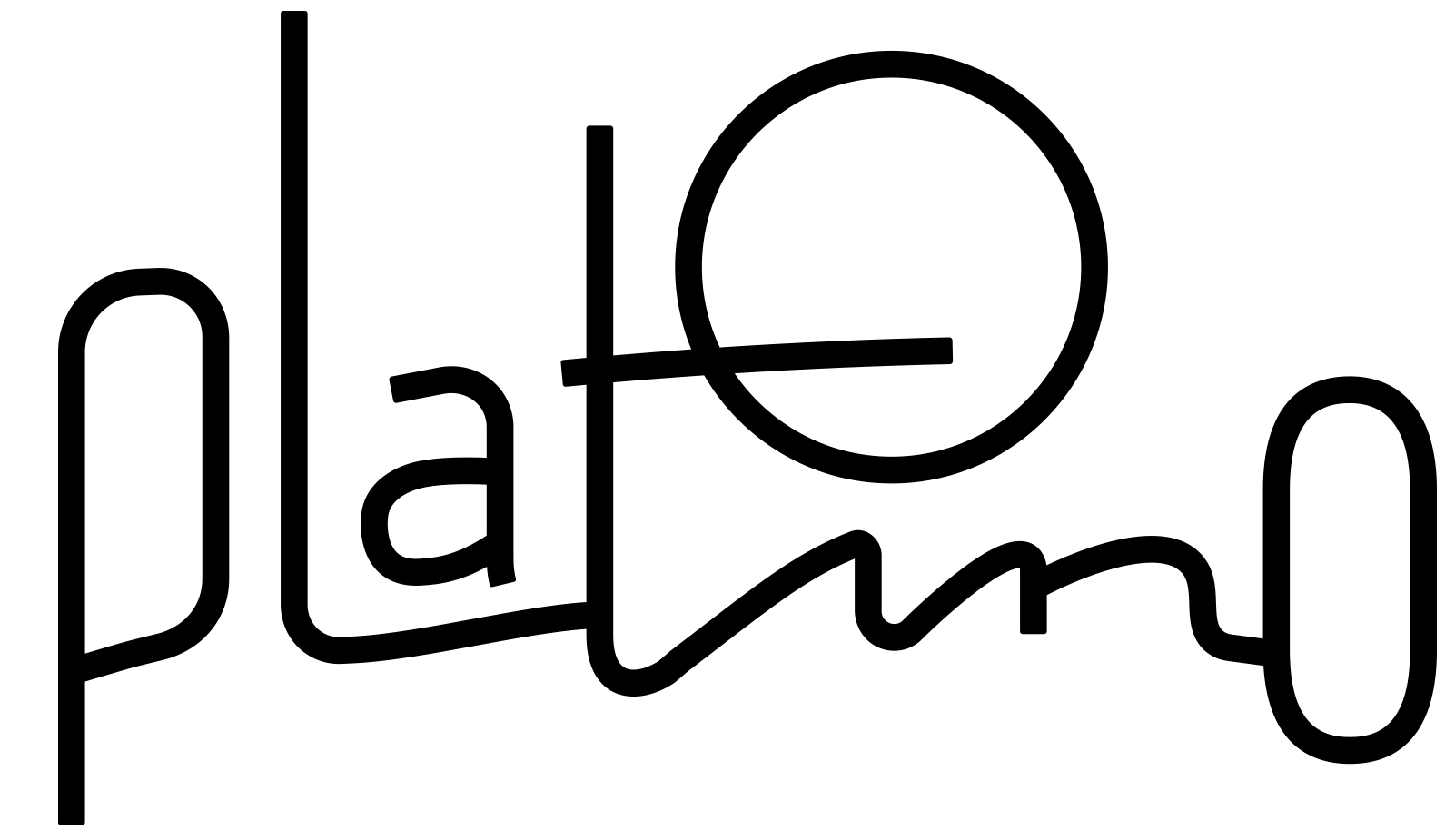
- Awarded for: Excellence in cinematic achievements
- Location: Ibero-America
- Presented by: Entidad de Gestión de Derechos de los Productores Audiovisuales (EGEDA), Federación Iberoamericana de Productores Cinematográficos y Audiovisuales (FIPCA)
- First award: 5 April 2014; 12 years ago
- Website: premiosplatino.com

The Platino Awards, known in Spanish as Premios Platino del Cine Iberoamericano ('Platinum Prizes of Ibero-American Cinema'), are Ibero-America's annual film awards.

The awards were established in 2013, and the first awards ceremony took place on 5 April 2014 at the Teatro Anayasi, Panama City. The ceremony continues to take place annually between April and July, and awards are given to films produced during the previous year.

The award itself is a platinum figure with the shape of a woman offering the world with Latin America's map on the center, it was created by designer Javier Mariscal.

== History ==
To reward the best Ibero-American films of each year, the Entidad de Gestión de Derechos de los Productores Audiovisuales (EGEDA) along with the Federación Iberoamericana de Productores Cinematográficos y Audiovisuales (FIPCA) decided to create the Platino Awards. The inaugural ceremony took place on 5 April 2014 at the Anayasi theatre in Panama City. The Awards were created as a window to show and promote Ibero-America´s cinematography around the world.

== Awards ==
As of 2026, 35 competitive categories are presented (20 for film and 15 for television), plus an Honorary Award. Usually, four nominees are announced per category though an additional nominee can be added in the case of ties during the voting stage.

During the first edition, nine film categories were presented. An award for miniseries and television series was introduced for the fourth edition, with further television categories destined to performances being added the following edition. In 2026, a major addition to the awards was announced, with twelve categories being introduced, these being mainly technical awards for both film and television productions. The award for Best Ibero-American Co-Production remains as the only discontinued award, being presented only during the first edition of the award.

=== Categories ===
==== Film ====
- Best Ibero-American Film
- Best Comedy Film
- Best Director
- Best Actor
- Best Actress
- Best Supporting Actor
- Best Supporting Actress
- Best Screenplay
- Best Original Score
- Best Animated Film
- Best Documentary
- Best First Feature Film
- Film and Education Values
- Best Film Editing
- Best Art Direction
- Best Cinematography
- Best Sound
- Best Costume Design
- Best Special Effects
- Best Make-up & Hairstyling

==== Television ====
- Best Miniseries or TV series
- Best Long-Form Series
- Best Actor in a Miniseries or TV series
- Best Actress in a Miniseries or TV series
- Best Supporting Actor in a Miniseries or TV series
- Best Supporting Actress in a Miniseries or TV series
- Best Series Creator
- Best Original Score for a Miniseries or TV series
- Best Editing for a Miniseries or TV series
- Best Art Direction for a Miniseries or TV series
- Best Cinematography for a Miniseries or TV series
- Best Sound for a Miniseries or TV series
- Best Costume Design for a Miniseries or TV series
- Best Special Effects for a Miniseries or TV series
- Best Make-up and Hairstyling for a Miniseries or TV series

=== Honorary categories ===
- Platino Honorary Award

== Award ceremonies ==
The following is a listing of all Platino Awards ceremonies since 2014.

Ceremony	Date	Best Picture winner	Host(s)	Venue
1st	5 April 2014	Gloria (Chile)	Alessandra Rosaldo & Juan Carlos Arciniegas	Teatro Anayasi, Panama City, Panama
2nd	18 July 2015	Wild Tales (Argentina)	Alessandra Rosaldo, Imanol Arias & Juan Carlos Arciniegas	Starlite Auditorio, Marbella, Spain
3rd	24 July 2016	Embrace of the Serpent (Colombia)	Natalia Oreiro, Santiago Segura & Adal Ramones	Centro de Convenciones, Punta del Este, Uruguay
4th	22 July 2017	The Distinguished Citizen (Argentina)	Carlos Latre & Natalia Oreiro	Caja Mágica, Madrid, Spain
5th	29 April 2018	A Fantastic Woman (Chile)	Eugenio Derbez	Gran Tlachco Theater, Riviera Maya, Mexico
6th	12 May 2019	Roma (Mexico)	Cecilia Suárez & Santiago Segura	Gran Tlachco Theater, Riviera Maya, Mexico
7th	29 June 2020	Pain and Glory (Spain)	Majida Issa, Omar Chaparro & Juan Carlos Arciniegas	Virtual
8th	3 October 2021	Forgotten We'll Be (Colombia)	Juana Acosta & Luis Gerardo Méndez	IFEMA Palacio Municipal, Madrid, Spain
9th	1 May 2022	The Good Boss (Spain)	Lali Espósito & Miguel Ángel Muñoz	IFEMA Palacio Municipal, Madrid, Spain
10th	22 April 2023	Argentina 1985 ( Argentina)	Carolina Gaitán, Omar Chaparro & Paz Vega	IFEMA Palacio Municipal, Madrid, Spain
11th	20 April 2024	Society of the Snow ( Spain)	Esmeralda Pimentel & Majida Issa	Gran Tlachco Theater, Riviera Maya, Mexico
12th	27 April 2025	I'm Still Here ( Brazil)	Aislinn Derbez & Asier Etxeandía	IFEMA Palacio Municipal, Madrid, Spain
13th	9 May 2026	The Secret Agent ( Brazil)	Carlos Torres & Cayetana Guillén Cuervo	Gran Tlachco Theater, Riviera Maya, Mexico

== Countries ==
The countries whose films are eligible for nomination are:

- Andorra
- Argentina
- Bolivia
- Brazil
- Chile
- Colombia
- Costa Rica
- Cuba
- Ecuador
- El Salvador
- Spain
- Guatemala
- Honduras
- Mexico
- Nicaragua
- Panama
- Paraguay
- Peru
- Portugal
- Puerto Rico
- Dominican Republic
- Uruguay
- Venezuela

== Trivia ==
=== "Big Five" winners and nominees ===
==== Winners ====
No film has won the awards for Best Film, Director, Actor, Actress and Screenplay yet.

==== Nominees ====
Four awards won

- Wild Tales (2015): won Film, Director (Damián Szifron), Screenplay (Damián Szifron) and Actress (Érica Rivas); lost Actor (Leonardo Sbaraglia).

One award won

- The Club (2016): won Screenplay (Pablo Larraín, Guillermo Calderón and Daniel Villalobos); lost Film, Director (Pablo Larraín), Actor (Alfredo Castro) and Actress (Antonia Zegers).

== Multiple wins ==
=== Films ===
Films with two or more awards.

8 wins

- Wild Tales (2015)

7 wins

- Embrace of the Serpent (2016)
- The Secret Agent (2026)

6 wins

- Pain and Glory (2020)
- Society of the Snow (2024)

5 wins

- A Fantastic Woman (2018)
- Roma (2019)
- Forgotten We'll Be (2021)
- Argentina, 1985 (2023)

4 wins

- A Monster Calls (2017)
- The Good Boss (2022)
- The Beasts (2023)
- 20,000 Species of Bees (2024)

3 wins

- Gloria (2014)
- The Distinguished Citizen (2017)
- Zama (2018)
- La llorona (2021)
- Parallel Mothers (2022)
- I'm Still Here (2025)

2 wins

- Underdogs (2014)
- Julieta (2017)
- The Realm (2019)
- The Heiresses (2019)
- Monos (2020)
- Rosa's Wedding (2021)
- The Mole Agent (2021)
- Lullaby (2023)
- Utama (2023)
- Robot Dreams (2024)
- The Room Next Door (2025)
- Undercover (2025)

=== Series ===
Series with two or more awards.

4 wins

- Patria (2021)
- News of a Kidnapping (2023)

3 wins

- Money Heist (2020)
- El Reino (2022)

2 wins

- The Great Heist (2021)
- La mesías (2024)

== Multiple nominations ==
=== Films ===
Films with four or more nominations.

14 nominations

- Argentina, 1985 (2023)

11 nominations

- La llorona (2021)
- Forgotten We'll Be (2021)
- The Good Boss (2022)

10 nominations

- Wild Tales (2015)

9 nominations

- Marshland (2015)
- A Fantastic Woman (2018)
- Roma (2019)

8 nominations

- Bad Hair (2015)
- Behavior (2015)
- Embrace of the Serpent (2016)
- Ixcanul (2016)
- Zama (2018)
- The Endless Trench (2020)
- Maixabel (2022)
- The Secret Agent (2026)

7 nominations

- Mr. Kaplan (2015)
- A Monster Calls (2017)
- Last Days in Havana (2018)
- Pain and Glory (2020)
- While at War (2020)
- Society of the Snow (2024)

6 nominations

- The Club (2016)
- A Twelve-Year Night (2019)
- Birds of Passage (2019)
- Schoolgirls (2021)
- Parallel Mothers (2022)
- The Beasts (2023)
- Lullaby (2023)
- Bardo, False Chronicle of a Handful of Truths (2023)
- Close Your Eyes (2024)
- El conde (2024)

5 nominations

- The Clan (2016)
- The German Doctor (2014)
- Magallanes (2016)
- Truman (2016)
- Neruda (2017)
- Summer 1993 (2018)
- Champions (2019)
- The Heiresses (2019)
- Utama (2023)
- Puan (2024)

4 nominations

- Gloria (2014)
- Living Is Easy with Eyes Closed (2014)
- The Distinguished Citizen (2017)
- Smoke & Mirrors (2017)
- Julieta (2017)
- The Thin Yellow Line (2017)
- From Afar (2017)
- The Bookshop (2018)
- The Summit (2018)
- The Realm (2019)
- Monos (2020)
- The Weasel's Tale (2020)
- Coven (2021)
- 7 Prisoners (2022)
- 1976 (2023)
- The Kings of the World (2023)
- The Delinquents (2024)
- 20,000 Species of Bees (2024)

=== Series ===
Series with four or more nominations.

6 nominations

- El Reino (2022)
- News of a Kidnapping (2023)

5 nominations

- Patria (2021)

4 nominations

- Money Heist (2020)
- Monzón: A Knockout Blow (2020)
- Someone Has to Die (2021)
- The Great Heist (2021)
- Money Heist (2021)
- Yosi, the Regretful Spy (2024)
- División Palermo (2024)

== See also ==
- Latin American television awards
- Goya Awards
- Ariel Awards
- Sur Awards
