= Platino Award for Best Supporting Actor in a Miniseries or TV series =

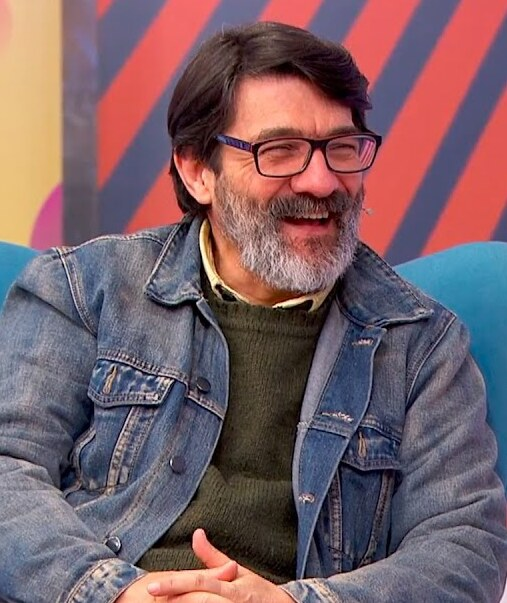
- 2026 recipient: César Troncoso
- Country: Ibero-America
- Presented by: Entidad de Gestión de Derechos de los Productores Audiovisuales (EGEDA); Federación Iberoamericana de Productores Cinematográficos y Audiovisuales (FIPCA)
- Currently held by: César Troncoso for The Eternaut (2026)
- Website: premiosplatino.com

The Platino Award for Best Supporting Actor in a Miniseries or TV series (Spanish: Mejor Interpretación Masculina de Reparto en Miniserie o Teleserie) is one of the Platino Awards, Ibero-America's film awards presented annually by the Entidad de Gestión de Derechos de los Productores Audiovisuales (EGEDA) and the Federación Iberoamericana de Productores Cinematográficos y Audiovisuales (FIPCA).

== History ==
Until the 3rd edition of the awards, only film categories were awarded. In 2017, the category for Best Miniseries or TV series was introduced, being followed the next year by performance categories in television productions (male lead and female lead). In 2020, the categories for acting in television were split between lead and supporting.

The category for Best Supporting Actor in a Miniseries or TV series was first introduced alongside the Platino Award for Best Supporting Actress in a Miniseries or TV series category in 2020 at the 7th Platino Awards. Argentine actor Gerardo Romano was the first recipient of the award for his role as Director Sergio Antín in the crime drama television series El Marginal.

No actor was won the award more than once while Mexican-Colombian actor Christian Tappan is the only actor to receive more than one nomination in the category with two consecutive nominations (2020 and 2021, winning the latter year for the series The Great Heist).

In the list below the winner of the award for each year is shown first, followed by the other nominees.

== Winners and nominees ==
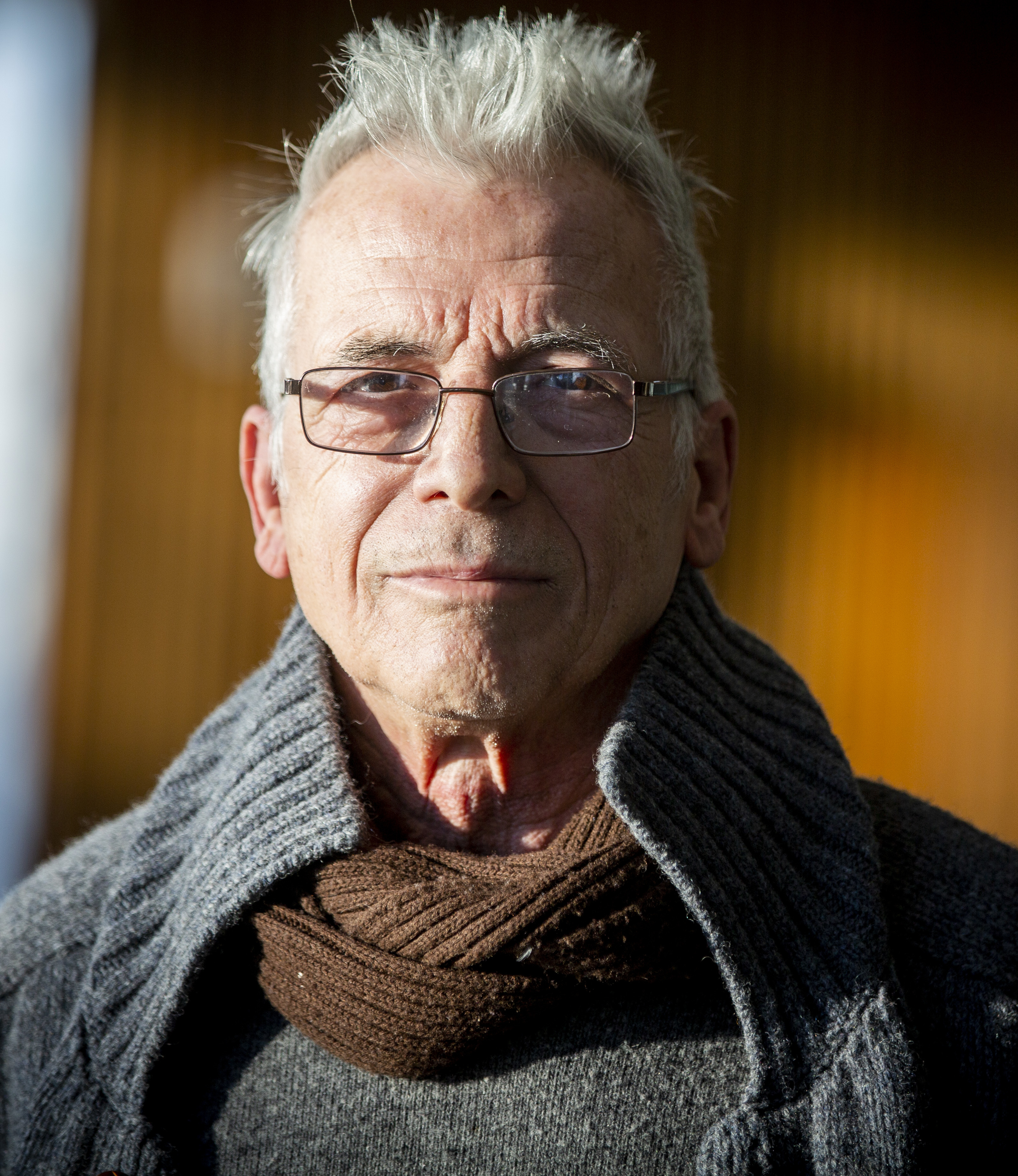
Gerardo Romano, the first recipient of the award.

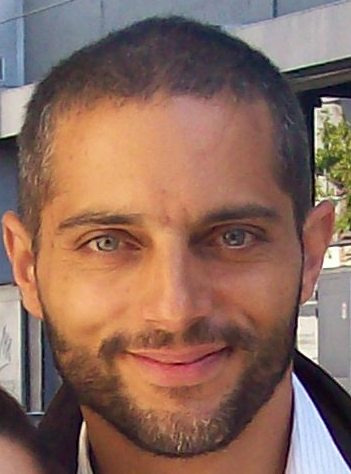
2022 winner Joaquín Furriel.

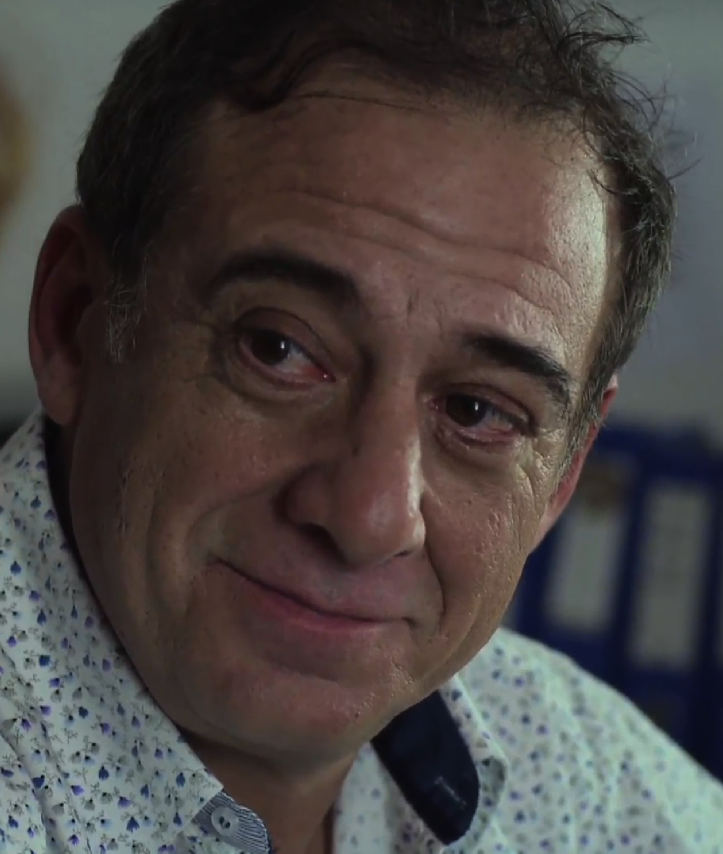
2023 winner Alejandro Awada.

=== 2020s ===
Year	Actor	Role(s)	English title	Original title
2020 (7th)
2020 (7th)	(Argentina) Gerardo Romano	Director Sergio Antín	El Marginal	
2020 (7th)	(Argentina) Gustavo Garzón	Roberto De Luca	Monzón: A Knockout Blow	Monzón
2020 (7th)	(Mexico) Juan Pablo Medina	Pablo Olvera	The House of Flowers	La casa de las flores
2020 (7th)	(Mexico) Christian Tappan	Apache	Wild District	Distrito salvaje
2021 (8th)	(Colombia) Christian Tappan	Jaime Molina "El Abogado"	The Great Heist	EL ROBO DEL $IGLO
2021 (8th)	(Spain) Ernesto Alterio	Gregorio Falcón	Somebody Has To Die	Alguien tiene que morir
2021 (8th)	(Spain) Patrick Criado	Rubén Murillo	Riot Police	Antidisturbios
2021 (8th)	(Argentina) Rodrigo de la Serna	Martín Berrote (Palermo / The Engineer)	Money Heist	La casa de papel
2022 (9th)	(Argentina) Joaquín Furriel	Rubén Osorio	El reino	
2022 (9th)	(Spain) Alberto San Juan	Cerdán	Reyes de la noche	
2022 (9th)	(Spain) Enric Auquer	Gari	Perfect Life	Vida perfecta
2022 (9th)	(Spain) Karra Elejalde	Enrique Moliner	La Fortuna	
2023 (10th)	(Argentina) Alejandro Awada	Saúl Menajem	Yosi, the Regretful Spy	Iosi, el espía arrepentido
2023 (10th)	(Colombia) Andrés Parra	Cerevro	Belascoarán	
2023 (10th)	(Spain) David Lorente	Lorenzo	I Don't Like Driving	No me gusta conducir
2023 (10th)	(Colombia) Rodrigo Celis	Don Pacho	News of a Kidnapping	Noticia de un Secuestro
2024 (11th)	(Argentina) Andy Chango	Charly García	El Amor Después del Amor	
2024 (11th)	(Argentina) Daniel Hendler	Miguel Rossi	División Palermo	
2024 (11th)	(Mexico) Emiliano Zurita	Casey	The Head of Joaquín Murrieta	La cabeza de Joaquín Murrieta
2024 (11th)	(Spain) Manolo Solo	Cardinal Santoro	30 Coins	30 monedas
2025 (12th)	(Colombia) Jairo Camargo	Apolinar Moscote	One Hundred Years of Solitude	Cien años de soledad
2025 (12th)	(Brazil) Hugo Bonemer	Nelson Piquet	Senna	
2025 (12th)	(Chile) Benjamín Vicuña	Nicolás	Envious	Envidiosa
2025 (12th)	(Colombia) Janer Villareal	Arcadio	One Hundred Years of Solitude	Cien años de soledad
2026 (13th)	(Uruguay) César Troncoso	Alfredo "Tano" Favalli	The Eternaut	El eternauta
2026 (13th)	(Spain) David Lorente	Antonio Tejero	The Anatomy of a Moment	Anatomía de un instante
2026 (13th)	(Spain) Eduard Fernández	Santiago Carrillo	The Anatomy of a Moment	Anatomía de un instante
2026 (13th)	(Mexico) Juan Lecanda	Marcos Barragán	Chespirito: Not Really on Purpose	Chespirito: Sin querer queriendo
