= Platino Award for Best Supporting Actor =

- Country: Ibero-America
- Presented by: Entidad de Gestión de Derechos de los Productores Audiovisuales (EGEDA), Federación Iberoamericana de Productores Cinematográficos y Audiovisuales (FIPCA)
- Currently held by: Álvaro Cervantes for Deaf (2026)
- Website: premiosplatino.com

The Platino Award for Best Supporting Actor (Spanish: Premio Platino al mejor actor de reparto/Premio Platino a la mejor interpretación masculina de reparto) is one of the Platino Awards, Ibero-America's film awards presented annually by the Entidad de Gestión de Derechos de los Productores Audiovisuales (EGEDA) and the Federación Iberoamericana de Productores Cinematográficos y Audiovisuales (FIPCA).

== History ==
It was first presented in 2021, with Chilean actor Alfredo Castro being the first recipient, for his role at "The Stallion" in The Prince. Prior to that, supporting male performances were included in the Best Actor category.

Alfredo Castro also received the award the first two years it was presented being the only multiple winner in the category to date as well as the only actor with multiple nominations for the award with two.

In the list below the winner of the award for each year is shown first, followed by the other nominees.

== Winners and nominees ==
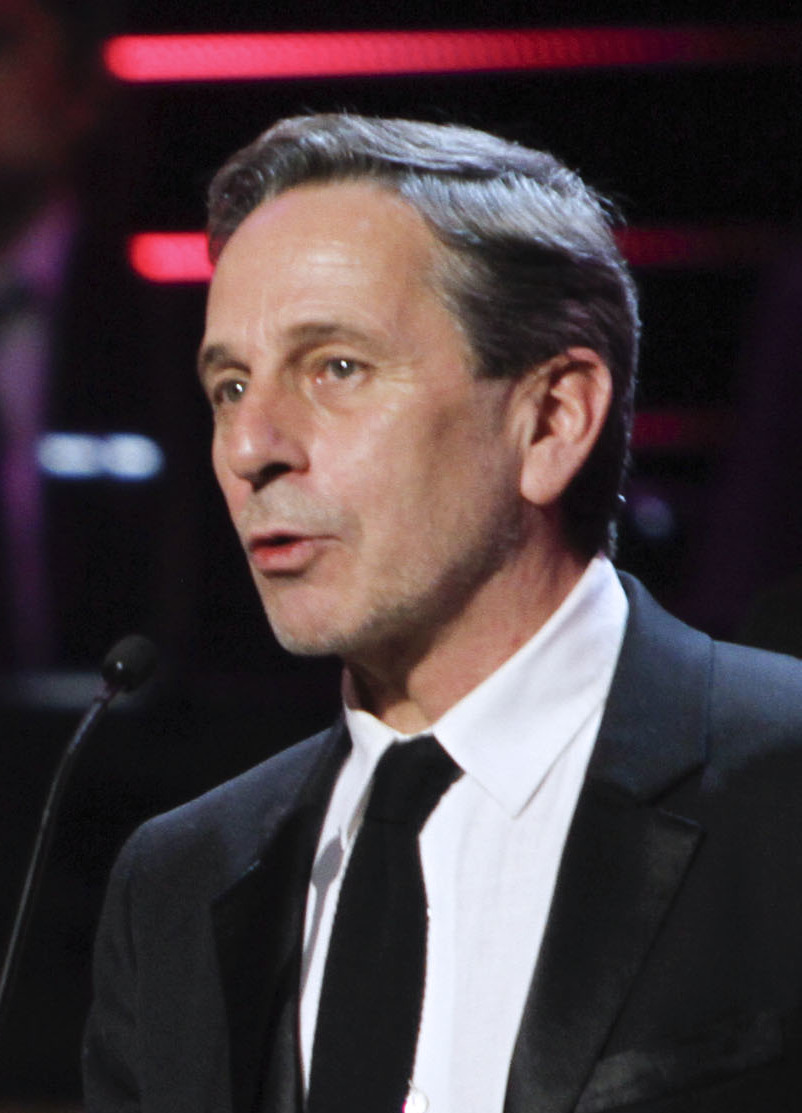
Two-time winner Alfredo Castro.

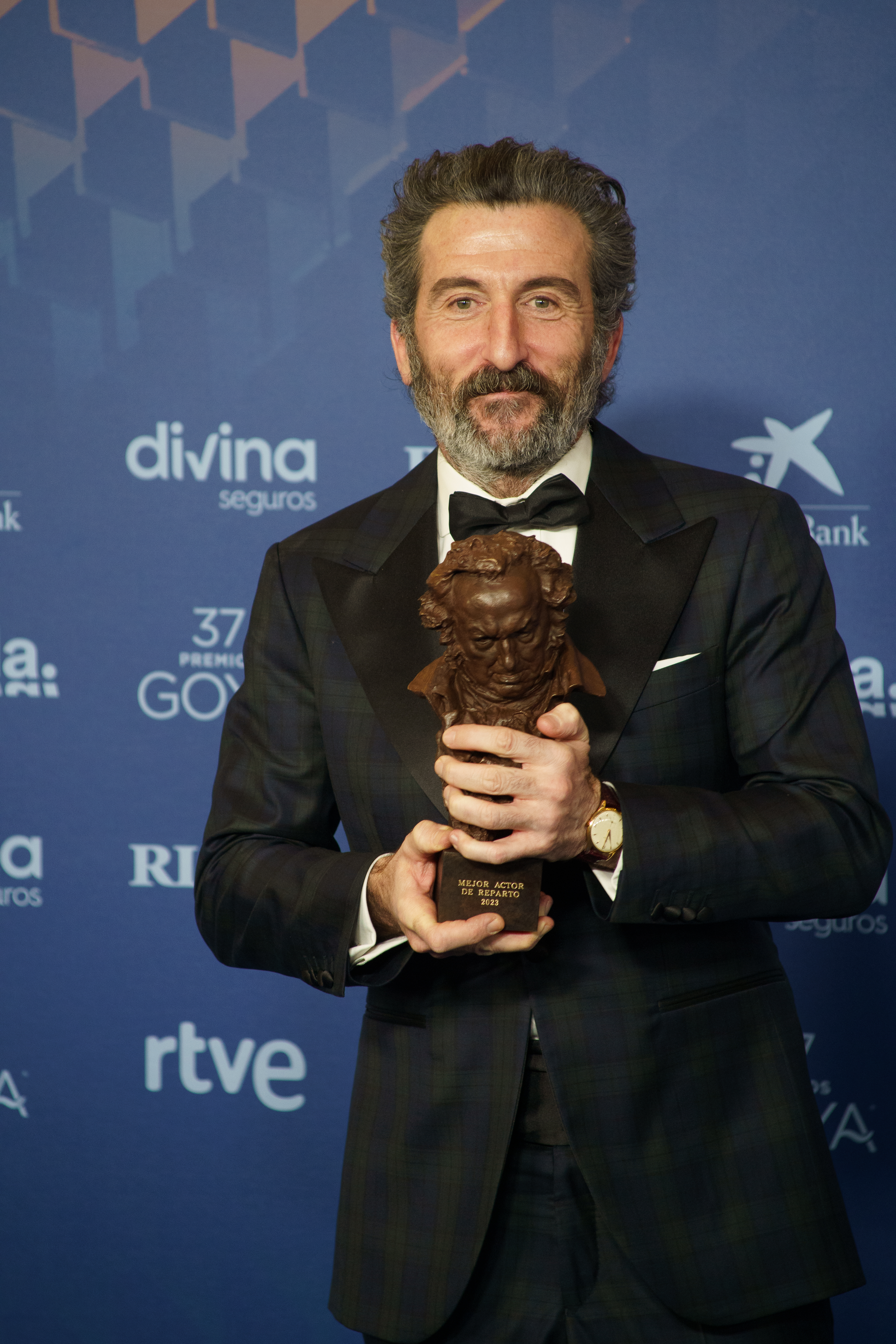
2023 winner Luis Zahera.

=== 2020s ===
Year	Actor	Role(s)	English title	Original title
2021 (8th)	(Chile) Alfredo Castro	"The Stallion"	The Prince	El príncipe
2021 (8th)	(Guatemala) Julio Díaz	Enrique Monteverde	La Llorona	
2021 (8th)	(Argentina) Jorge Román	Mario	Killing the Dead	Matar a un muerto
2021 (8th)	(Mexico) Diego Boneta	Daniel	New Order	Nuevo Orden
2022 (9th)	(Chile) Alfredo Castro	El Corto	Karnawal	
2022 (9th)	(Brazil) Christian Malheiros	Mateus	7 Prisoners	7 Prisioneiros
2022 (9th)	(Spain) Manolo Solo	Miralles	The Good Boss	El buen patrón
2022 (9th)	(Spain) Urko Olazabal	Luis Carrasco	Maixabel	
2023 (10th)	(Spain) Luis Zahera	Xan	The Beasts	As bestas
2023 (10th)	(Argentina) Carlos Portaluppi	León Carlos Arslanián	Argentina, 1985	
2023 (10th)	(Argentina) Norman Briski	Ruso	Argentina, 1985	
2023 (10th)	(Spain) Ramón Barea	Koldo	Lullaby	Cinco lobitos
2024 (11th)	(Spain) José Coronado	Miguel Garay	Close Your Eyes	Cerrar los ojos
2024 (11th)	(Argentina) Leonardo Sbaraglia	Rafael Sujarchuk	Puan	
2024 (11th)	(Spain) Luis Bermejo	Casero	Un amor	
2024 (11th)	(Argentina) Matías Recalt	Roberto Canessa	Society of the Snow	La sociedad de la nieve
2025 (12th)	(Argentina) Daniel Fanego	Fanego	Kill the Jockey	El jockey
2025 (12th)	(Argentina) Darío Grandinetti	Pedro	Nina	
2025 (12th)	(Spain) Diego Anido	Sergio Polo	Undercover	La infiltrada
2025 (12th)	(Mexico) Héctor Kotsifakis	Fulgor Sedano	Pedro Páramo	
2026 (13th)	(Spain) Álvaro Cervantes	Héctor	Deaf	Sorda
2026 (13th)	(Venezuela) Edgar Ramírez	Francisco	It Would Be Night in Caracas	Aún es de noche en Caracas
2026 (13th)	(Argentina) Juan Minujín	Pablo	Sundays	Los domingos
2026 (13th)	(Brazil) Rodrigo Santoro	Cadu	The Blue Trail	O Último Azul

== See also ==
- Ariel Award for Best Supporting Actor
- Goya Award for Best Supporting Actor
