= 8th Platino Awards =

- Date: 3 October 2021
- Site: IFEMA Palacio Municipal, Madrid, Spain
- Hosted by: Juana Acosta & Luis Gerardo Méndez

Highlights
- Best Film: Forgotten We'll Be
- Honorary Award: Diego Luna
- Most awards: Film: Forgotten We'll Be (5); Television: Patria (4)
- Most nominations: Film: La llorona (11); Television: Patria (5)

Television coverage
- Network: RTVE Play, TNT, Trece

The 8th Platino Awards recognized excellence in the Ibero-American audiovisual industry, presented by the Entidad de Gestión de Derechos de los Productores Audiovisuales (EGEDA) and the Federación Iberoamericana de Productores Cinematográficos y Audiovisuales (FIPCA). The ceremony took place at the IFEMA Palacio Municipal in Madrid, Spain on 3 October 2021, at 19:00 UTC.

The biggest winner of the night was the Colombian film Forgotten We'll Be with five awards (including Best Film, Best Actor and Best Director), whereas the Spanish limited television miniseries Patria was the most successful miniseries or TV series, winning four awards. The Platino Honorary Award was handed to Mexican actor Diego Luna.

== Background ==
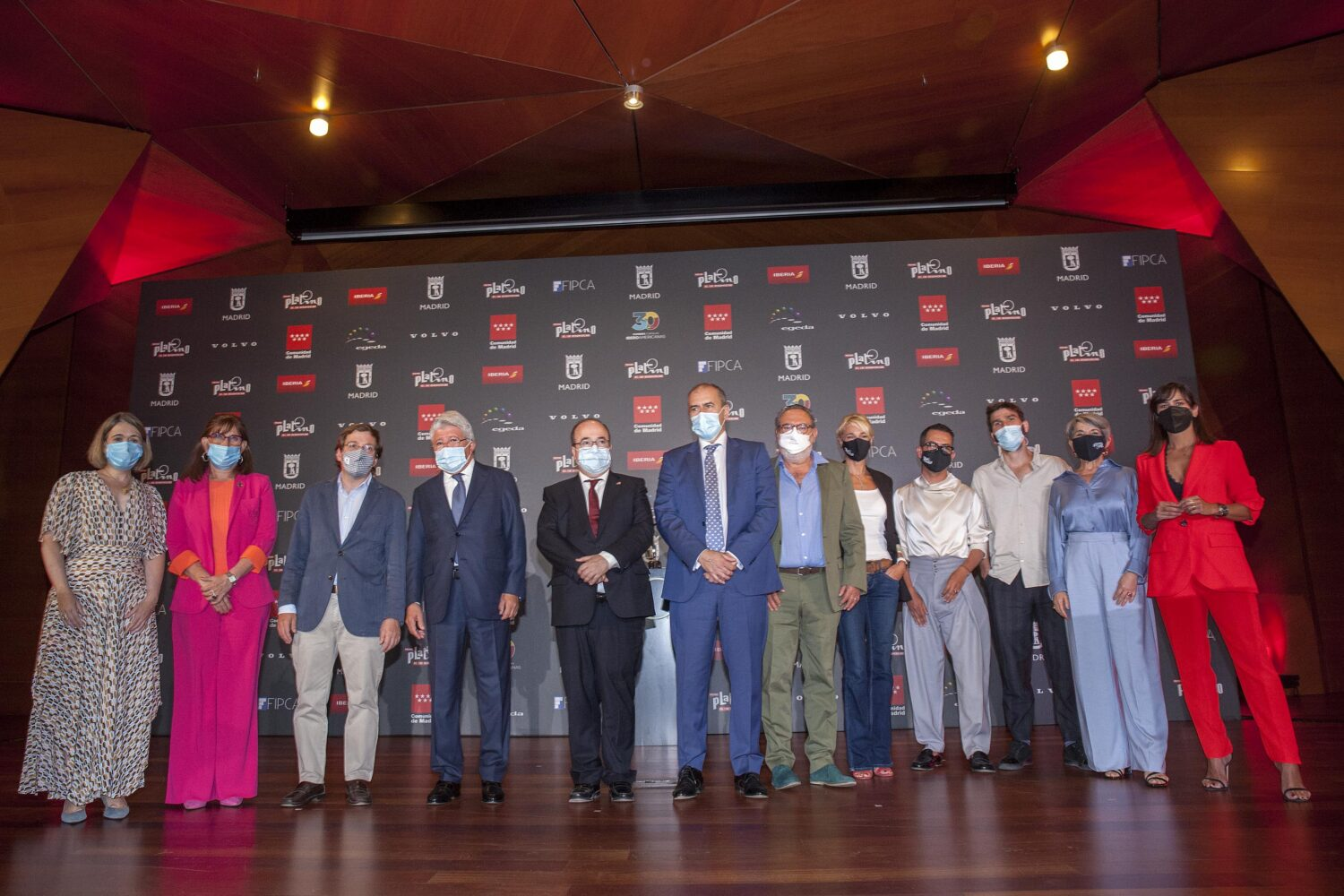
Event at which the final nominations were presented on 19 July 2021.

The list of pre-selections was disclosed on 6 May 2021. The 8th awards added new categories both in film and television, Best Series Creator, Best Supporting Actor in Film and Best Supporting Actress in Film.

The film pre-selection had a 8% of titles from Mexico, followed by Argentina, Brazil, Chile, Spain and Portugal (with a 7% each). Regarding the television series, a 18% of titles were from Spain, followed by Mexico (14%), Argentina (12%) and Colombia (11%).

Pending the final nominations, the shortlist of candidates (20 per category) was revealed on 11 June 2021.

The nominations were announced on 19 July 2021 from the Madrid Town Hall by actresses Belén Rueda and Paulina García, director Manolo Caro and presenter Elena Sánchez. Miquel Iceta, Enrique Cerezo, Rebeca Grynspan, Marta Rivera, José Luis Martínez-Almeida and Adrián Solar also attended the event. The "Ibero–American Hymn" composed by Lucas Vidal was presented at the event, commemorating the Day of Ibero–America (19 July). Regarding the film section, the Colombian film Forgotten We'll Be and the Guatemalan film La llorona obtained the most nominations (11). The Spanish series Patria was the television series with the most nominations (5). The official poster was designed by Javier Mariscal.

On 29 September 2021, the organization reported the acts of Ara Malikian, Becky G, Carlos Baute, Natalia Oreiro, Juan Magán, Pedro Capó and Sara Baras in the event, to be presented by Juana Acosta and Luis Gerardo Méndez.

The IB Public's Choice Platino Awards were handed at The Westin Palace Madrid on 2 October, before the night ceremony at the IFEMA Palacio Municipal on 3 October. They were awarded to Manolo Caro's Someone Has to Die (Best Series), Álvaro Morte (Best TV Actor for Money Heist), María Mercedes Coroy (Best Film Actress for La llorona), Diego Peretti (Best Film Actor for The Heist of the Century) and Cecilia Suárez (Best TV Actress for The House of Flowers).

== Categories ==
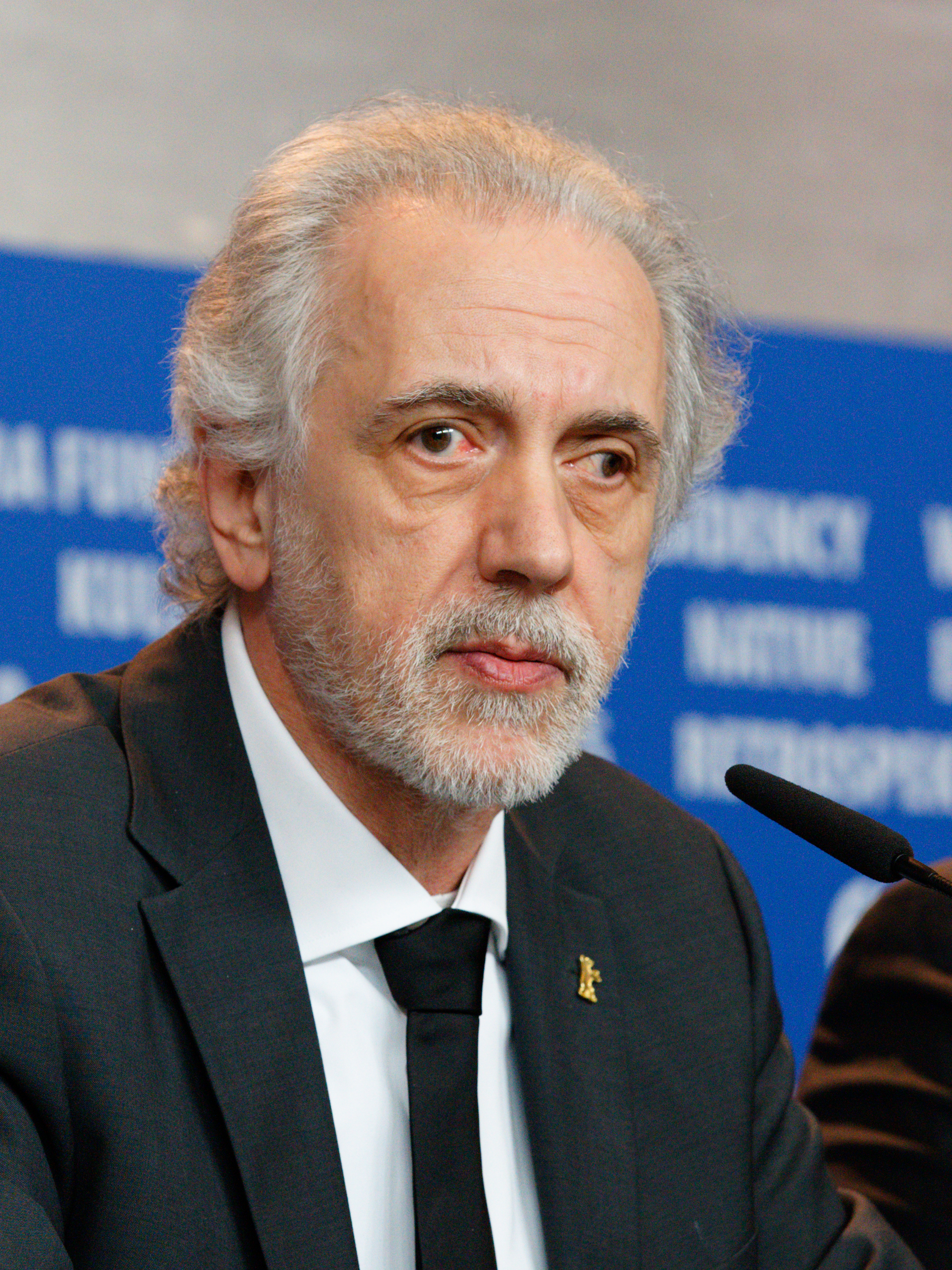
Best Director winner, Fernando Trueba.

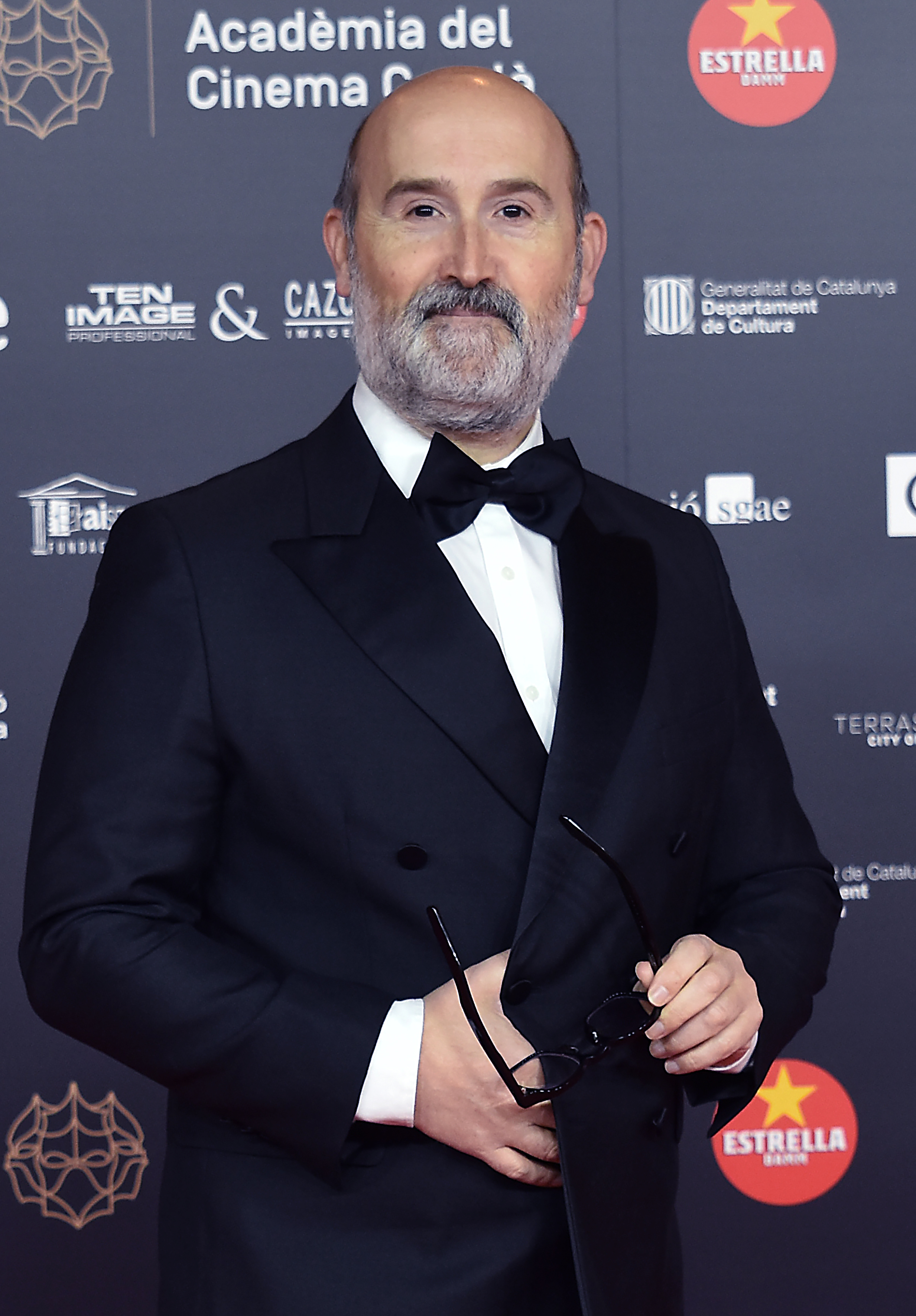
Best Actor in Film winner, Javier Camara

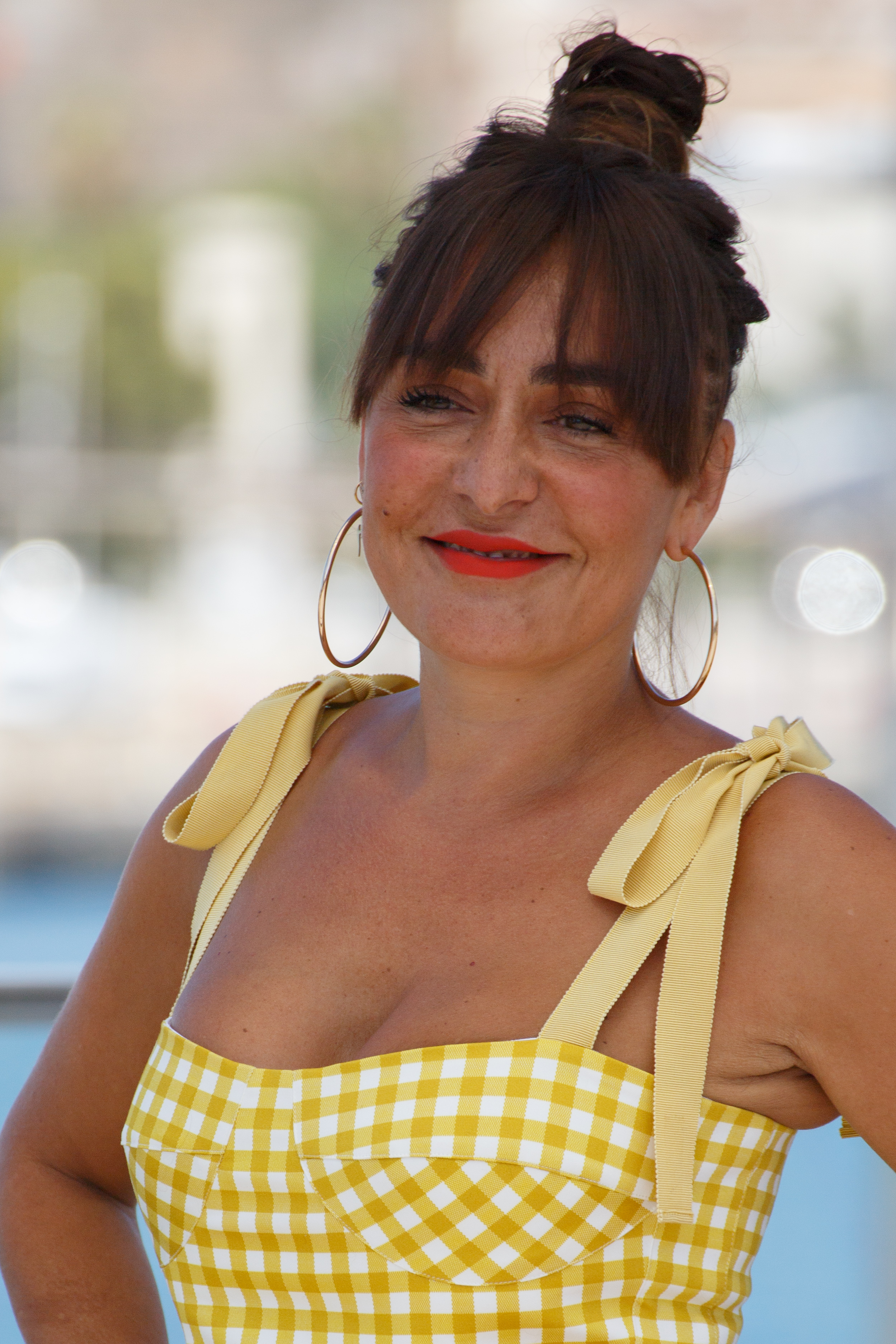
Best Actress in Film winner, Candela Peña.

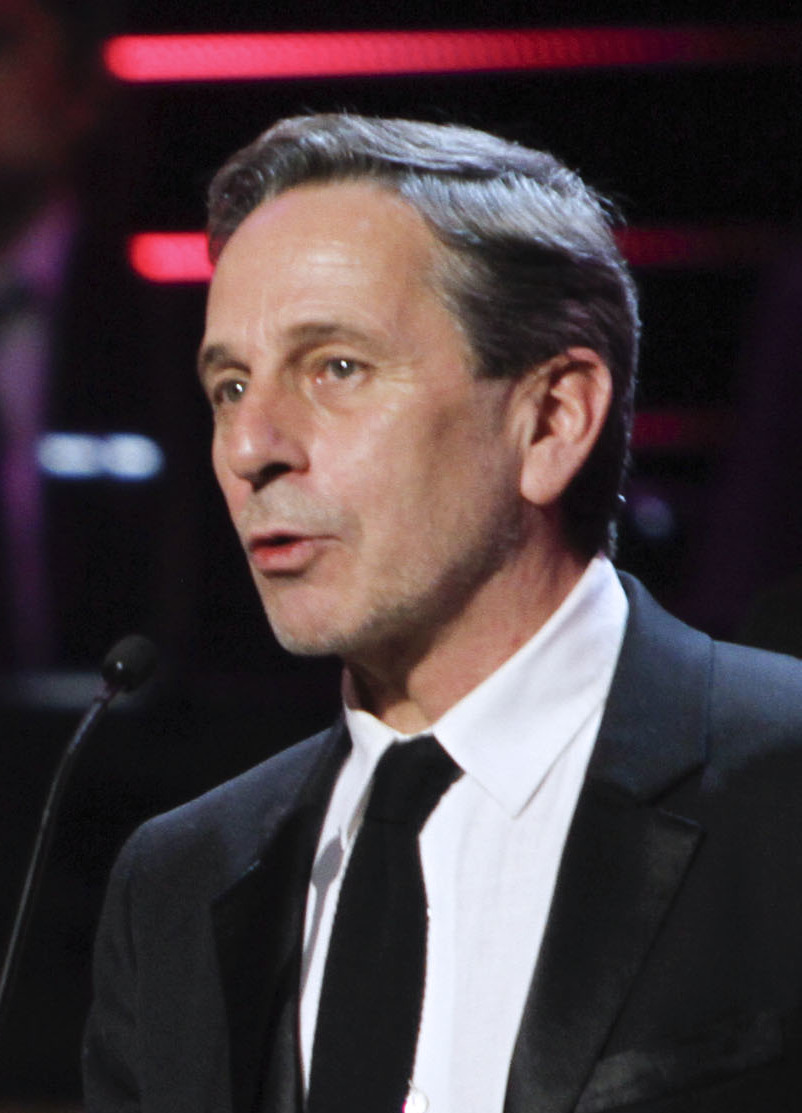
Best Supporting Actor in Film winner, Alfredo Castro.

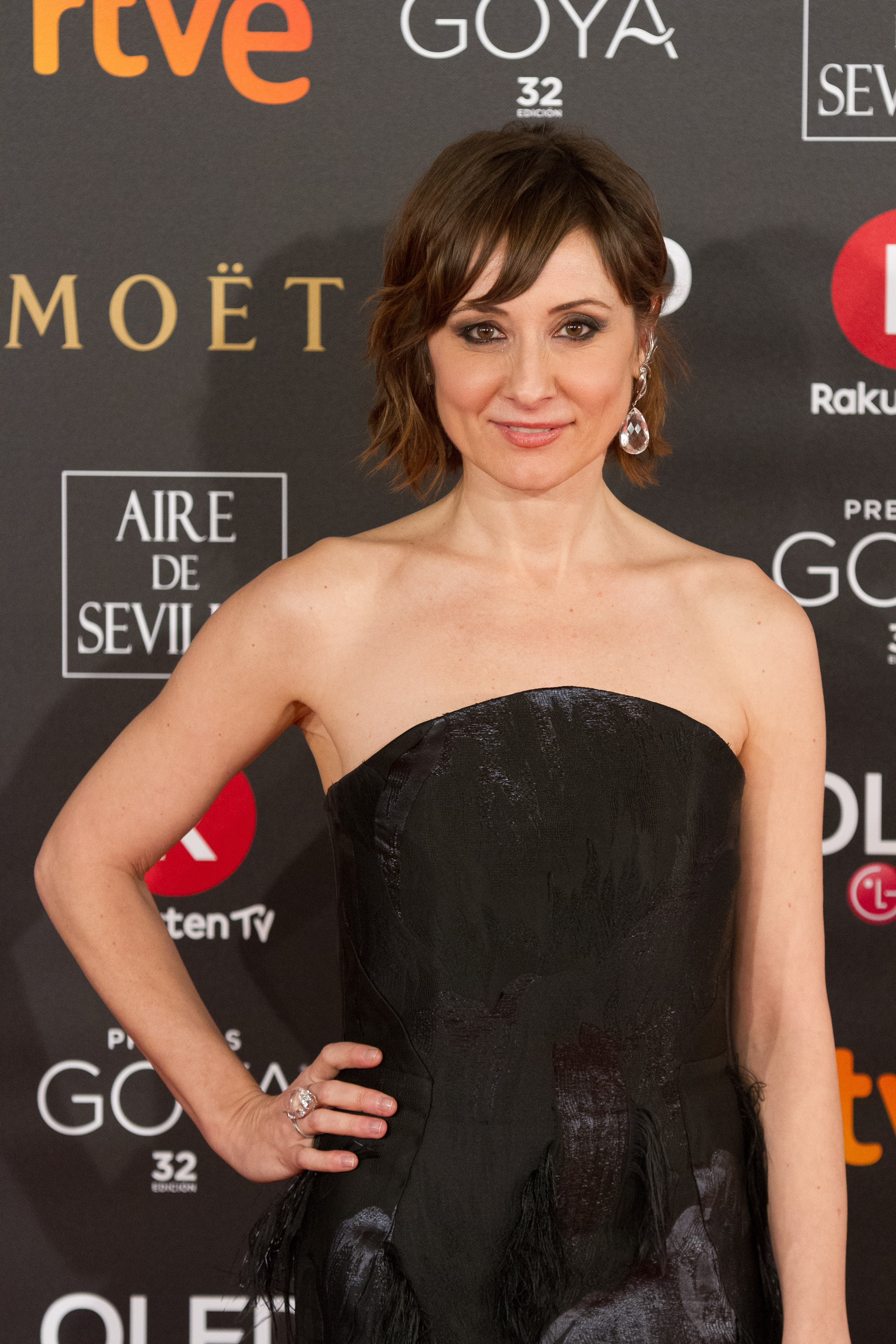
Best Supporting Actress in Film winner, Nathalie Poza.

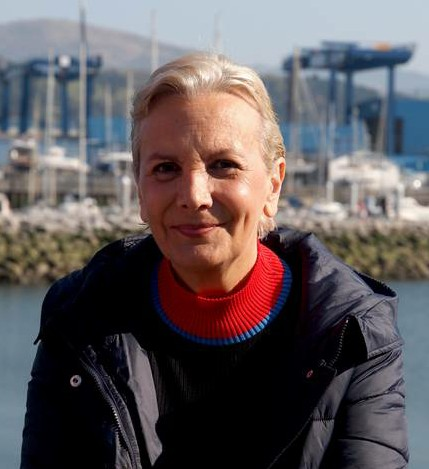
Best Actress in a Series winner, Elena Irureta.

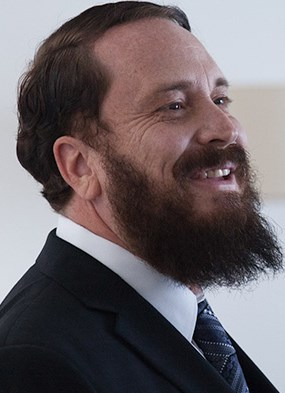
Best Supporting Actor in a Series, Christian Tappan.

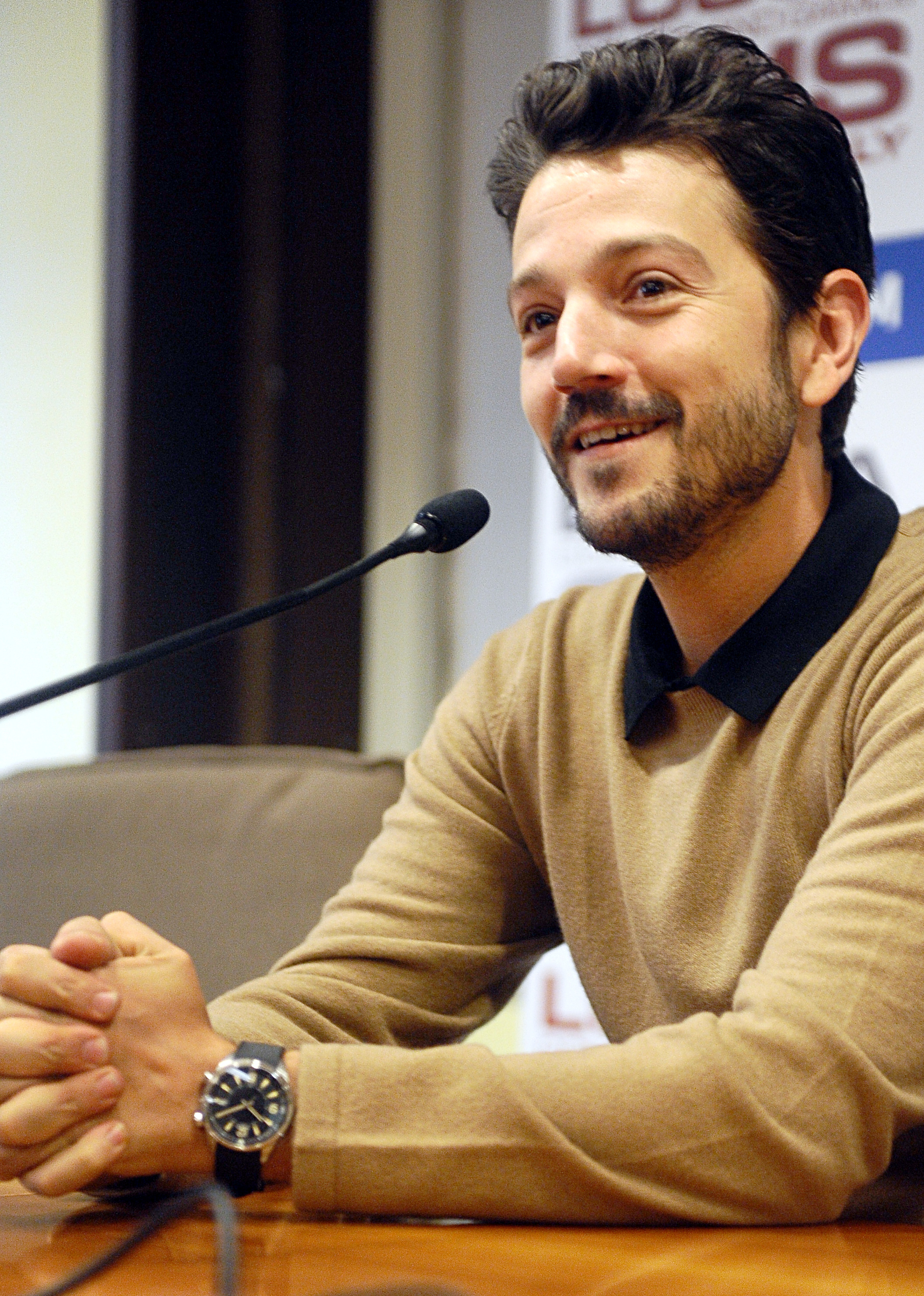
Honorary Award recipient, Diego Luna.

=== Film ===
Best Ibero-American Film: Forgotten We'll Be; La Llorona; Schoolgirls; New Order	Best Director: Fernando Trueba — Forgotten We'll Be; Icíar Bollaín — Rosa's Wedding; Jayro Bustamante — La Llorona; Michel Franco — New Order
Best Actor: Javier Cámara — Forgotten We'll Be as Héctor Abad Gómez; Miguel Ángel Solá — The Crimes That Bind as Ignacio Arrieta; Diego Peretti — The Heist of the Century as Fernando Araujo; Alfredo Castro — My Tender Matador as "La loca del frente"	Best Actress: Candela Peña — Rosa's Wedding as Rosa; María Mercedes Coroy — La llorona as Alma; Valeria Lois — Las siamesas as Stella; Regina Casé — Three Summers as Madalena dos Santos Marins
Best Supporting Actor: Alfredo Castro — The Prince as "The Stallion"; Julio Díaz — La Llorona as Enrique Monteverde; Jorge Román — Killing the Dead as Mario; Diego Boneta — New Order as Daniel	Best Supporting Actress: Nathalie Poza — Rosa's Wedding as Violeta; Yanina Ávila — The Crimes That Bind as Gladys Pereyra; Kami Zea — Forgotten We'll Be as Marta; Sabrina de la Hoz — La Llorona as Natalia
Best Screenplay: David Trueba — Forgotten We'll Be; Sebastián Schindel, Pablo Del Teso — The Crimes That Bind; Jayro Bustamante, Lisandro Sánchez — La Llorona; Pilar Palomero — Schoolgirls	Best Original Score: Maite Arroitajauregi, Aránzazu Calleja — Coven; Song Without a Name — Pauchi Sasaki; Forgotten We'll Be — Zbigniew Preisner; La Llorona — Pascual Reyes
Best Animated Film: Turu, the Wacky Hen; El camino de Xico; The Red Scroll; A Costume for Nicholas	Best Documentary: The Mole Agent; Babenco: Tell Me When I Die; Cartas mojadas; The Year of the Discovery
Best Cinematography: Nicolás Wong — La Llorona; Javier Agirre Erauso — Coven; Sergio Iván Castaño — Forgotten We'll Be; Daniela Cajías — Schoolgirls	Best Art Direction: Diego López — Forgotten We'll Be; Mikel Serrano — Coven; Sebastián Muñoz — La Llorona; Mónica Bernuy — Schoolgirls
Best Editing: Gustavo Matheu, Jayro Bustamante — La Llorona; Marta Velasco — Forgotten We'll Be; Sofi Escudé — Schoolgirls; Yibrán Asuad, Fernando Frías de la Parra — I'm No Longer Here	Best Sound: Eduardo Cáceres — La Llorona; Urko Garai, J. Rodríguez, Frédéric Hamelin, L. De Loredo — Coven; Eduardo Castro, Octavio Rojas — Forgotten We'll Be; Javier Umpierrez, Yuri Laguna, Olaitan Agueh, Michelle Couttolenc, Jaime Baksht — I'm No Longer Here
Best Ibero-American Debut Film: Schoolgirls — Pilar Palomero; Song Without a Name — Melina León; Kill Pinochet — Juan Ignacio Sabatini; Killing the Dead — Hugo Giménez	Film and Education Values: The Mole Agent; Adú; Forgotten We'll Be; Our Mothers

=== Television ===
Best Ibero-American Miniseries or TV series: Patria; Someone Has To Die; Riot Police; The Great Heist	Best Series Creator: Aitor Gabilondo — Patria; Álex de la Iglesia — 30 Monedas; Rodrigo Sorogoyen & Isabel Peña — Riot Police; Álex Pina — Money Heist
Best Actor in a Miniseries or TV series: Andrés Parra — The Great Heist as Roberto Lozano "Chayo"; Eduard Fernández — 30 Monedas as Father Manuel Vergara; Alejandro Speitzer — Someone Has To Die as Gabino Falcón; Álvaro Morte — Money Heist as Sergio Marquina (The Professor) / Salvador "Salva" Martín	Best Actress in a Miniseries or TV series: Elena Irureta — Patria as Bittori; Inma Cuesta — The Mess You Leave Behind as Raquel Valero; Marcela Benjumea — The Great Heist as "Doña K"; Cecilia Suárez — The House of Flowers as Paulina de la Mora
Best Supporting Actor in a Miniseries or TV series: Christian Tappan — The Great Heist as Jaime Molina "El Abogado"; Ernesto Alterio — Someone Has To Die as Gregorio Falcón; Patrick Criado — Riot Police as Rubén Murillo; Rodrigo de la Serna — Money Heist as Martín Berrote (Palermo / The Engineer)	Best Supporting Actress in a Miniseries or TV series: Loreto Mauleón — Patria as Arantxa Garmendia Uzkudun; Ester Expósito — Someone Has To Die as Cayetana Aldama; Najwa Nimri — Money Heist as Alicia Sierra; Susana Abaitua — Patria as Nerea Lertxundi

=== Platino Honorary Award ===
- Diego Luna

== Films with multiple nominations and awards ==
The following films received multiple nominations:

Nominations	Film
11	Forgotten We'll Be
11	La Llorona
6	Schoolgirls
4	Coven
3	New Order
3	Rosa's Wedding
3	The Crimes That Bind
2	Killing the Dead
2	Song Without a Name
2	The Mole Agent
2	I'm No Longer Here

The following films received multiple awards:

Awards	Film
5	Forgotten We'll Be
3	La Llorona
2	Rosa's Wedding
2	The Mole Agent

== Series with multiple nominations and awards ==
The following series and miniseries received multiple nominations:

Nominations	Series
5	Patria
4	Someone Has to Die
4	The Great Heist
4	Money Heist
3	Riot Police
2	30 Monedas

The following series and miniseries received multiple awards:

Awards	Series
4	Patria
2	The Great Heist
