= 7th Platino Awards =

2020 film awards ceremony

- Date: June 29, 2020
- Site: Virtual

Highlights
- Best Film: Pain and Glory
- Best Actor: Antonio Banderas; Pain and Glory
- Best Actress: Carol Cuarte; The Invisible Life of Eurídice Gusmão
- Most awards: Pain and Glory (7)
- Most nominations: The Endless Trench (8)

The 7th Platino Awards honoured the best in Ibero-American films of 2019 presented by the Entidad de Gestión de Derechos de los Productores Audiovisuales (EGEDA) and the Federación Iberoamericana de Productores Cinematográficos y Audiovisuales (FIPCA). The ceremony was meant to take place at Gran Tlachco Theater in Riviera Maya, Mexico on May 3, 2020 but due to the COVID-19 pandemic was postponed. The nominees were announced on March 18, 2020 and the winners were presented by Majida Issa, Omar Chaparro y Juan Carlos Arciniegas via YouTube on June 29, 2020.

== Winners and nominees ==
=== Film ===
| Best Ibero-American Film: Pain and Glory; The Invisible Life of Eurídice Gusmão; The Endless Trench; Monos | Best Director: Pedro Almodóvar — Pain and Glory; Alejandro Amenábar — While at War; Aitor Arregi, Jon Garaño, Jose Mari Goenaga — The Endless Trench; Juan José Campanella — The Weasel's Tale |
| Best Actor: Antonio Banderas — Pain and Glory as Salvador Mallo; Antonio de la Torre — The Endless Trench as Higinio Blanco; Karra Elejalde — While at War as Miguel de Unamuno; Ricardo Darín — Heroic Losers as Fermín Perlassi | Best Actress: Carol Duarte — The Invisible Life of Eurídice Gusmão as Eurídice Gusmão; Graciela Borges — The Weasel's Tale as Mara Ordaz; Belén Cuesta — The Endless Trench as Rosa; Ilse Salas — The Good Girls as Sofía |
| Best Screenplay: Pedro Almodóvar — Pain and Glory; Murilo Hauser, Inés Bortagaray, Karim Aïnouz — The Invisible Life of Eurídice Gusmão; Jose Mari Goenaga, Luiso Berdejo — The Endless Trench; Alejandro Amenábar, Alejandro Hernández — While at War | Best Original Score: Alberto Iglesias — Pain and Glory; Emilio Kauderer — The Weasel's Tale; Alejandro Amenábar — While at War; Mica Levi — Monos |
| Best Animated Film: Buñuel in the Labyrinth of the Turtles; A Cidade dos Piratas; Elcano & Magellan: The First Voyage Around the World; Klaus | Best Documentary: The Edge of Democracy; Ara Malikian: Una vida entre las cuerdas; El cuadro; Historias de nuestro cine |
| Best Cinematography: Monos — Jasper Wolf; The Endless Trench — Javier Agirre Erauso; The Good Girls — Dariela Ludlow; While at War — Alex Catalán | Best Art Direction: While at War — Juan Pedro de Gaspar; Insumisas — Alexis Álvarez; The Endless Trench — Pepe Domínguez; The Good Girls — Claudio Ramírez Castelli |
| Best Editing: Pain and Glory — Teresa Font; Spider — Andrea Chignoli; Heroic Losers — Alejandro Carrillo Penovi; The Endless Trench — Laurent Dufreche, Raúl López | Best Sound: Monos — Lena Esquenazi; Pain and Glory — Sergio Bürman, Pelayo Gutiérrez, Marc Orts; The Weasel's Tale — José Luis Díaz; While at War — Aitor Berenguer, Gabriel Gutiérrez |
| Best Debut Film: Lila Avilés — The Chambermaid; Antonella Sudasassi — The Awakening of the Ants; Belén Funes — A Thief's Daughter; Aritz Moreno — Advantages of Travelling by Train | Film and Education Values: The Awakening of the Ants; Spider; Seventeen; Elisa & Marcela |

=== Television ===
Best Ibero-American Miniseries or TV series: Money Heist; Wild District; El Marginal; Monzón: A Knockout Blow
| Best Actor in a Miniseries or TV series: Álvaro Morte — Money Heist as Sergio Marquina (The Professor) / Salvador "Salva" Martín; Javier Cámara — Vota Juan as Juan Carrasco; Óscar Jaenada — Hernán as Hernán Cortés; Jorge Román — Monzón: A Knockout Blow as Carlos Monzón | Best Actress in a Miniseries or TV series: Cecilia Suárez — The House of Flowers as Paulina de la Mora; Úrsula Corberó — Money Heist as Silene Oliveira (Tokyo); Leticia Dolera — Perfect Life as María Eugenia Aguado; Candela Peña — Hierro as Candela Montes |
| Best Supporting Actor in a Miniseries or TV series: Gerardo Romano — El Marginal as Director Sergio Antín; Gustavo Garzón — Monzón: A Knockout Blow as Roberto De Luca; Juan Pablo Medina — The House of Flowers as Pablo Olvera; Christian Tappan — Wild District as Apache | Best Supporting Actress in a Miniseries or TV series: Alba Flores — Money Heist as Ágata Jiménez (Nairobi); Belén Cuesta — Paquita Salas as Magüi Moreno; Florencia Raggi — Monzón: A Knockout Blow as Patricia Rosello; Mariana Treviño — The House of Flowers as Jenny Quetzal |
