= Platino Award for Best Actor =

Ibero-American film award

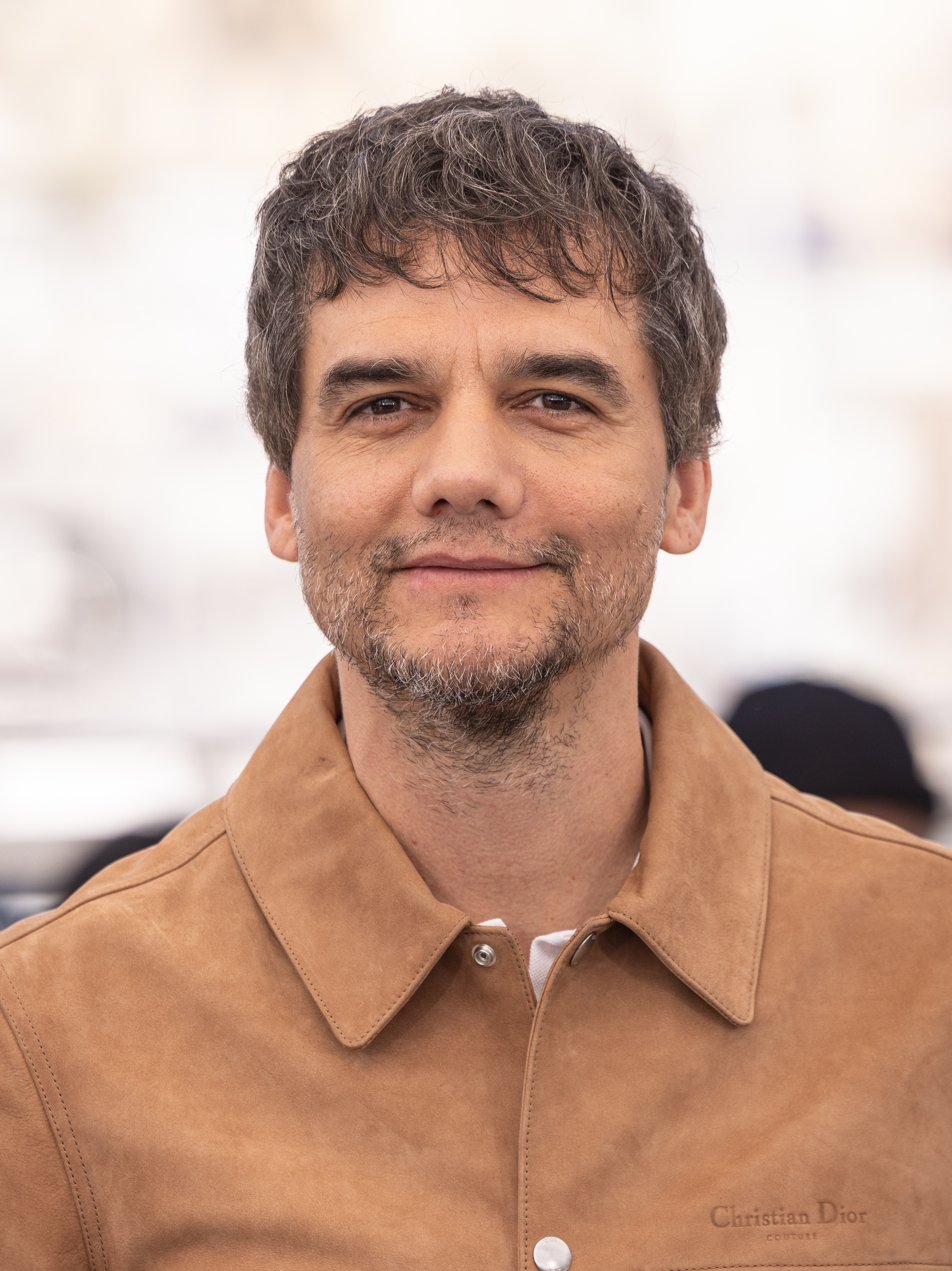
- 2026 recipient: Wagner Moura
- Country: Ibero-America
- Presented by: Entidad de Gestión de Derechos de los Productores Audiovisuales (EGEDA); Federación Iberoamericana de Productores Cinematográficos y Audiovisuales (FIPCA)
- Currently held by: Wagner Moura for The Secret Agent (2026)
- Website: premiosplatino.com

The Platino Award for Best Actor (Spanish: Premio Platino al mejor actor / Premio Platino a la mejor interpretación masculina) is one of the Platino Awards, Ibero-America's film awards presented annually by the Entidad de Gestión de Derechos de los Productores Audiovisuales (EGEDA) and the Federación Iberoamericana de Productores Cinematográficos y Audiovisuales (FIPCA).

== History ==
It was first presented in 2014, with Mexican actor, Eugenio Derbez being the first recipient of the award, for his role as Valentín Bravo in Instructions Not Included. Until the 7th edition in 2020, male supporting performances were included in this category. In 2021, the category for Best Supporting Actor was created.

No actor has won this award more than once while actors Alfredo Castro and Ricardo Darín have received the most nominations for this award with four each, followed by Javier Bardem, Antonio de la Torre, Javier Gutiérrez, Javier Cámara, Luis Tosar, Eduard Fernández and Damián Alcázar with three each; Daniel Giménez Cacho with two.

Spain holds the record of most wins in the category with five of the eight winners being Spanish actors, followed by Argentina, with three Argentine winners.

2020 winner Antonio Banderas also received a nomination for the Best Actor for Pain and Glory at the 92nd Academy Awards.

2026 winner Wagner Moura also received a nomination for the Best Actor for The Secret Agent at the 98th Academy Awards.

In the list below the winner of the award for each year is shown first, followed by the other nominees.

== Winners and nominees ==
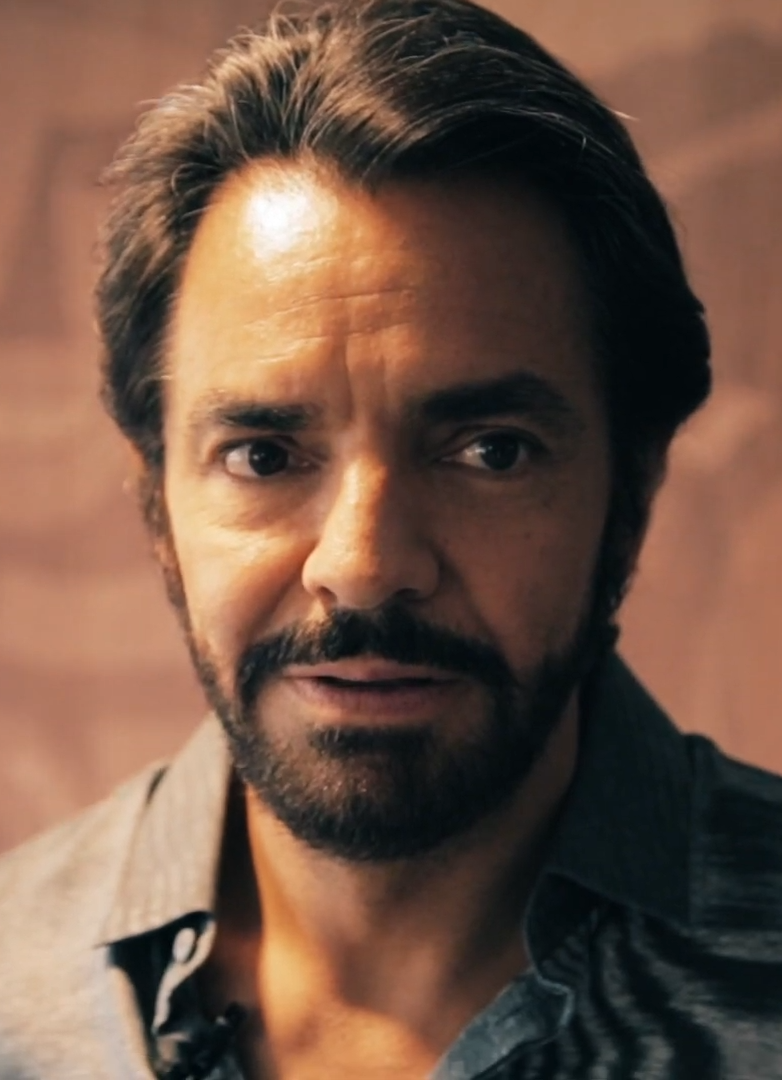
Eugenio Derbez, the first recipient of the award.

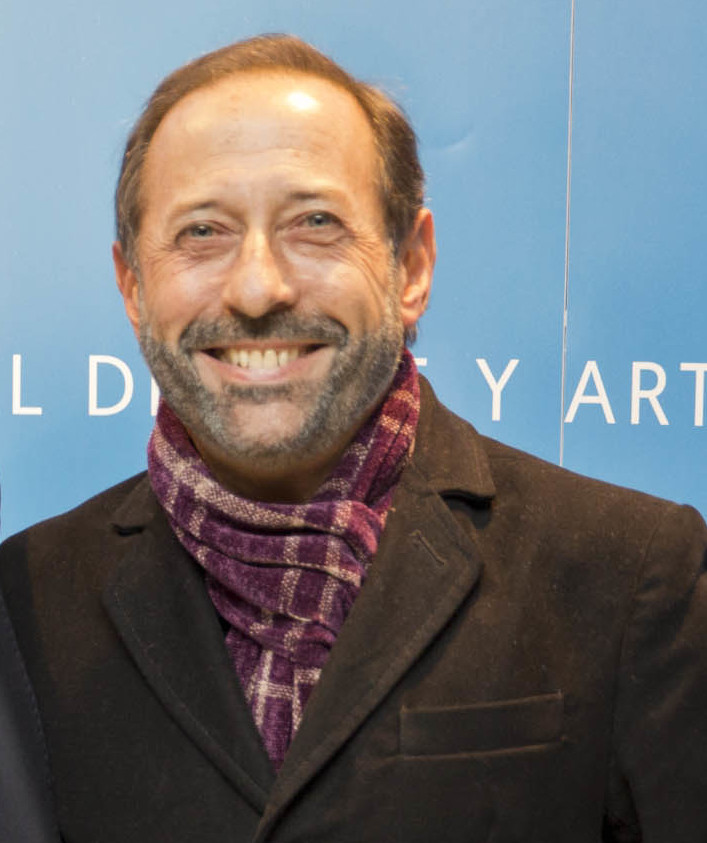
Guillermo Francella won in 2016.

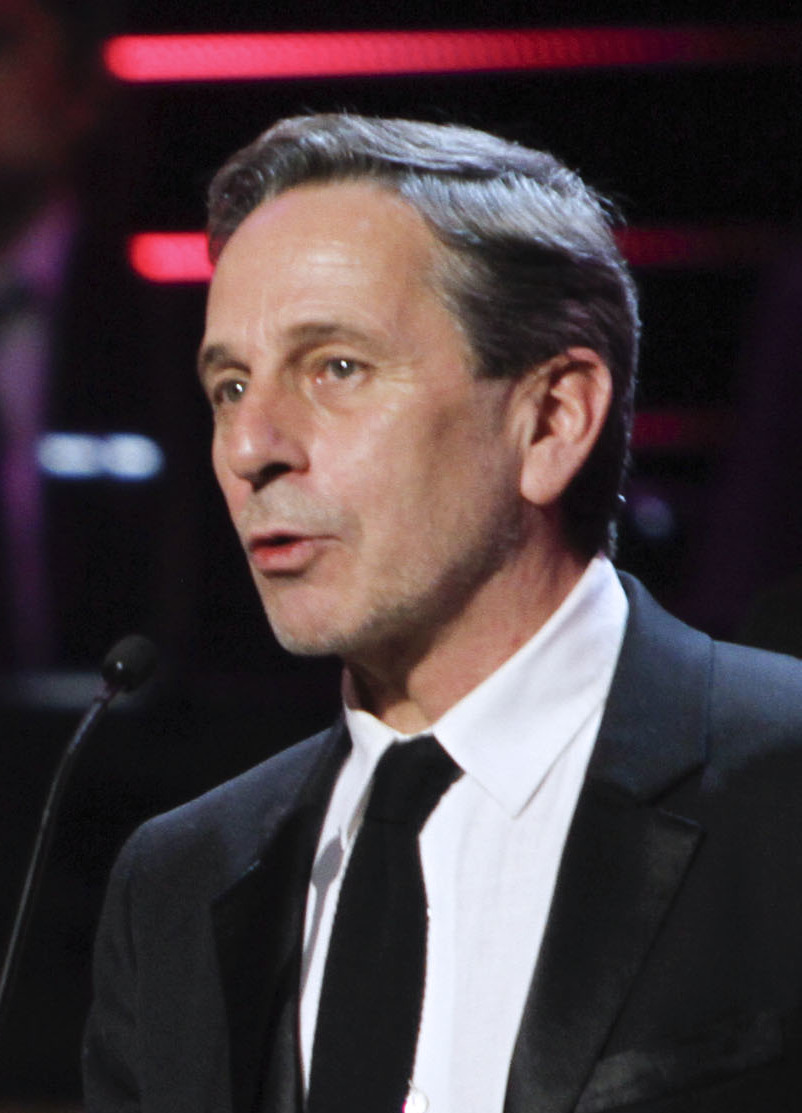
Alfredo Castro won in 2018.

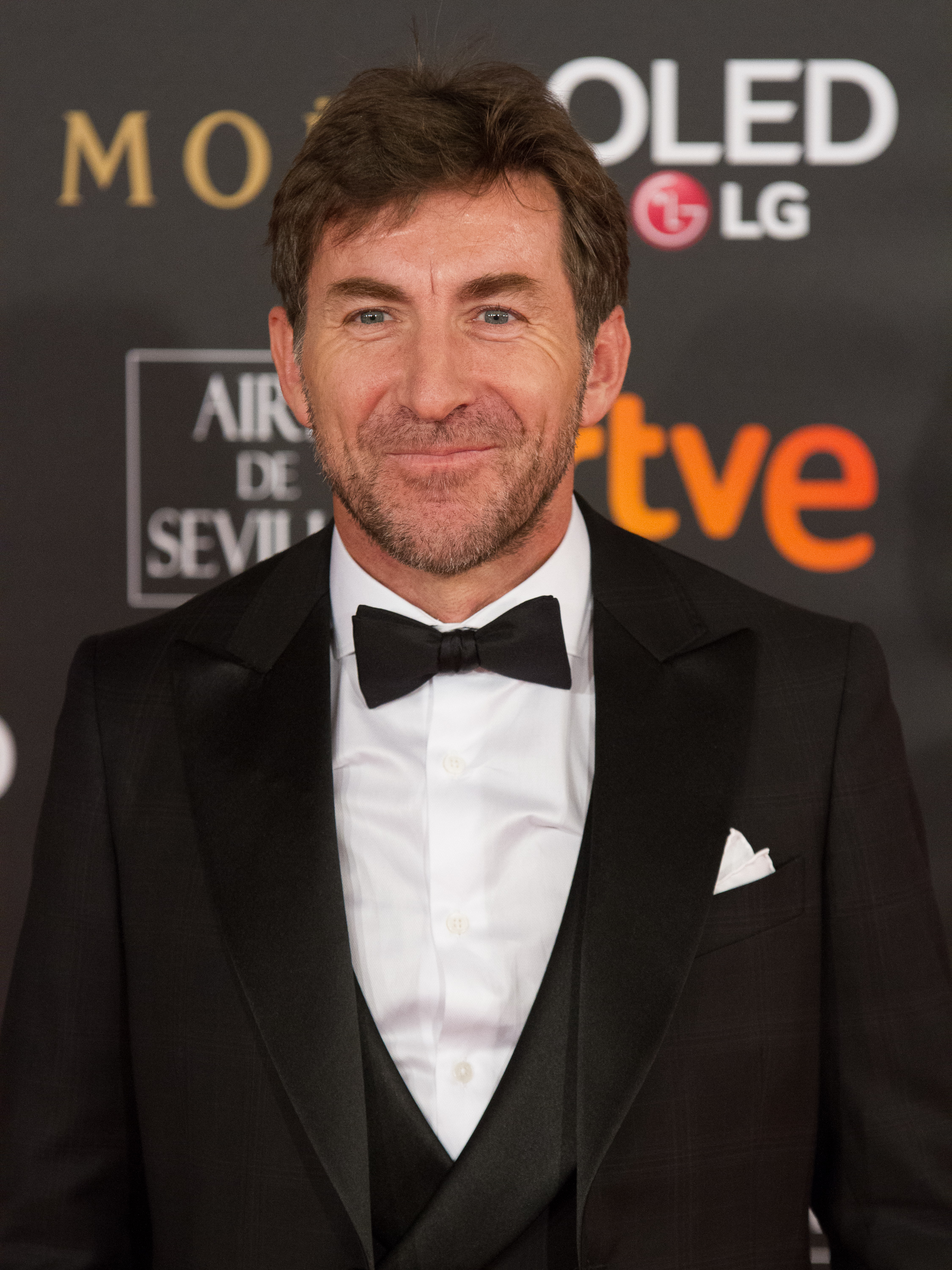
Antonio de la Torre won in 2019.

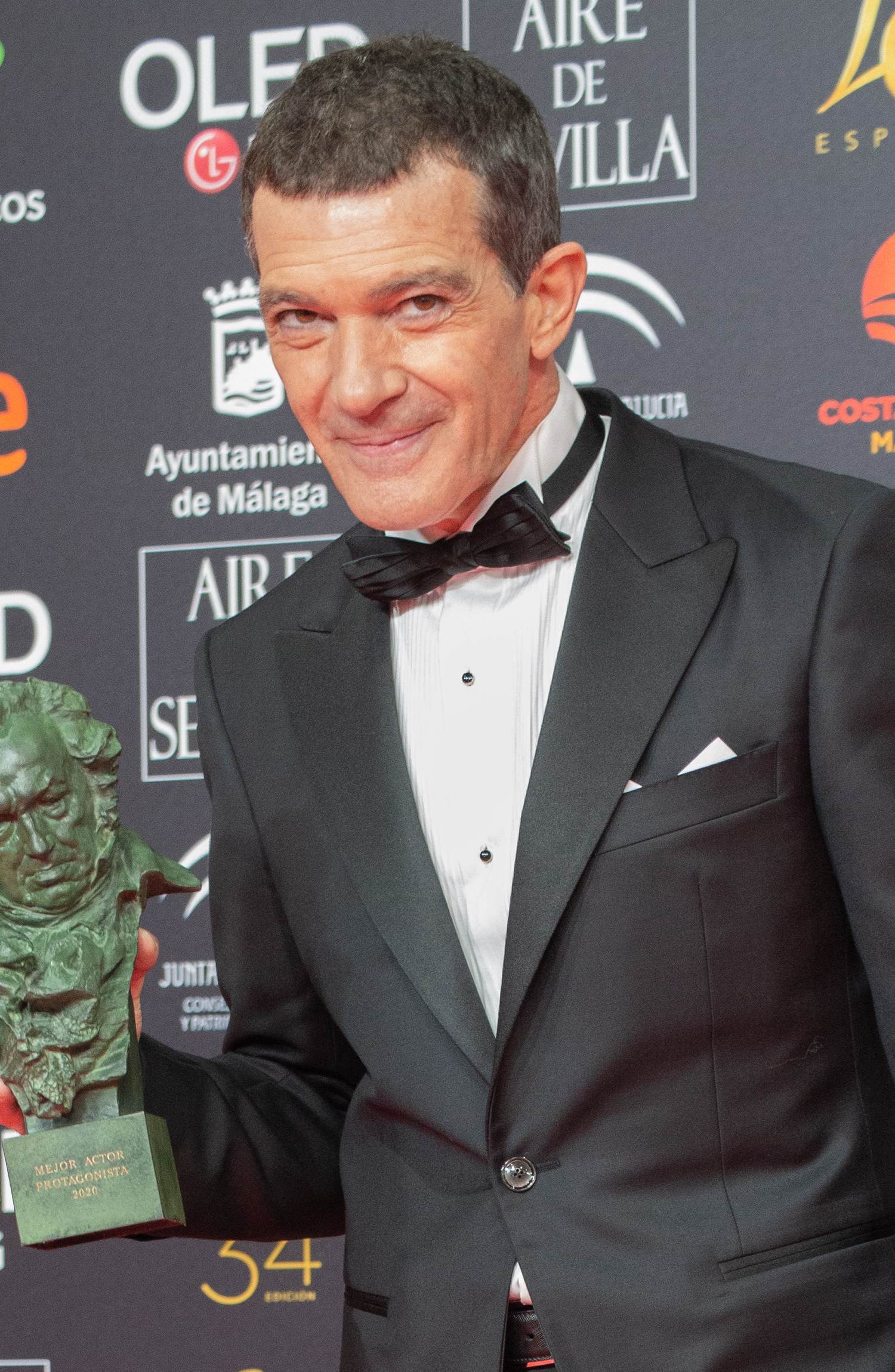
Antonio Banderas won in 2020.

=== 2010s ===
Year	Actor	Role(s)	English title	Original title
2014 (1st)	(Mexico) Eugenio Derbez	Valentín Bravo	Instructions Not Included	No se aceptan devoluciones
2014 (1st)	(Spain) Antonio de la Torre	Carlos	Cannibal	Caníbal
2014 (1st)	(Spain) Javier Cámara	Antonio	Living Is Easy with Eyes Closed	Vivir es fácil con los ojos cerrados
2014 (1st)	(Argentina) Ricardo Darín	Roberto Bermúdez	Thesis on a Homicide	Tesis sobre un homicidio
2014 (1st)	(Peru) Víctor Prada	Eusebio	The Cleaner	El limpiador
2015 (2nd)	(Spain) Óscar Jaenada	Cantinflas	Cantinflas	
2015 (2nd)	(Puerto Rico) Benicio del Toro	Pablo Escobar	Escobar: Paradise Lost	
2015 (2nd)	(Spain) Javier Gutiérrez	Juan Robles	Marshland	La isla mínima
2015 (2nd)	(Cuba) Jorge Perugorría	Luis	La pared de las palabras	
2015 (2nd)	(Argentina) Leonardo Sbaraglia	Diego	Wild Tales	Relatos Salvajes
2016 (3rd)	(Argentina) Guillermo Francella	Arquímedes Puccio	The Clan	El Clan
2016 (3rd)	(Chile) Alfredo Castro	Father Vidal	The Club	El Club
2016 (3rd)	(Mexico) Damián Alcázar	Harvey Magallanes	Magallanes	
2016 (3rd)	(Spain) Javier Cámara	Tomás	Truman	
2016 (3rd)	(Argentina) Ricardo Darín	Julián	Truman	
2017 (4th)	(Argentina) Oscar Martínez	Daniel Mantovani	The Distinguished Citizen	El ciudadano ilustre
2017 (4th)	(Chile) Alfredo Castro	Armando	From Afar	Desde allá
2017 (4th)	(Mexico) Damián Alcázar	Toño	The Thin Yellow Line	La delgada línea amarilla
2017 (4th)	(Spain) Eduard Fernández	Francisco Paesa	Smoke & Mirrors	El hombre de las mil caras
2017 (4th)	(Chile) Luis Gnecco	Pablo Neruda	Neruda	
2018 (5th)
2018 (5th)	(Chile) Alfredo Castro	Juan	Los Perros	
2018 (5th)	(Mexico) Daniel Giménez Cacho	Diego de Zama	Zama	
2018 (5th)	(Spain) Javier Bardem	Pablo Escobar	Loving Pablo	
2018 (5th)	(Spain) Javier Gutiérrez	Álvaro	The Motive	El Autor
2018 (5th)	(Cuba) Jorge Martinez	Diego	Last Days in Havana	Últimos días en La Habana
2019 (6th)
2019 (6th)	(Spain) Antonio de la Torre	Manuel López Vidal	The Realm	El reino
2019 (6th)	(Spain) Javier Bardem	Paco	Everybody Knows	Todos lo saben
2019 (6th)	(Spain) Javier Gutiérrez	Marco Montes	Champions	Campeones
2019 (6th)	(Argentina) Lorenzo Ferro	Robledo Puch	El Angel	El Ángel

=== 2020s ===
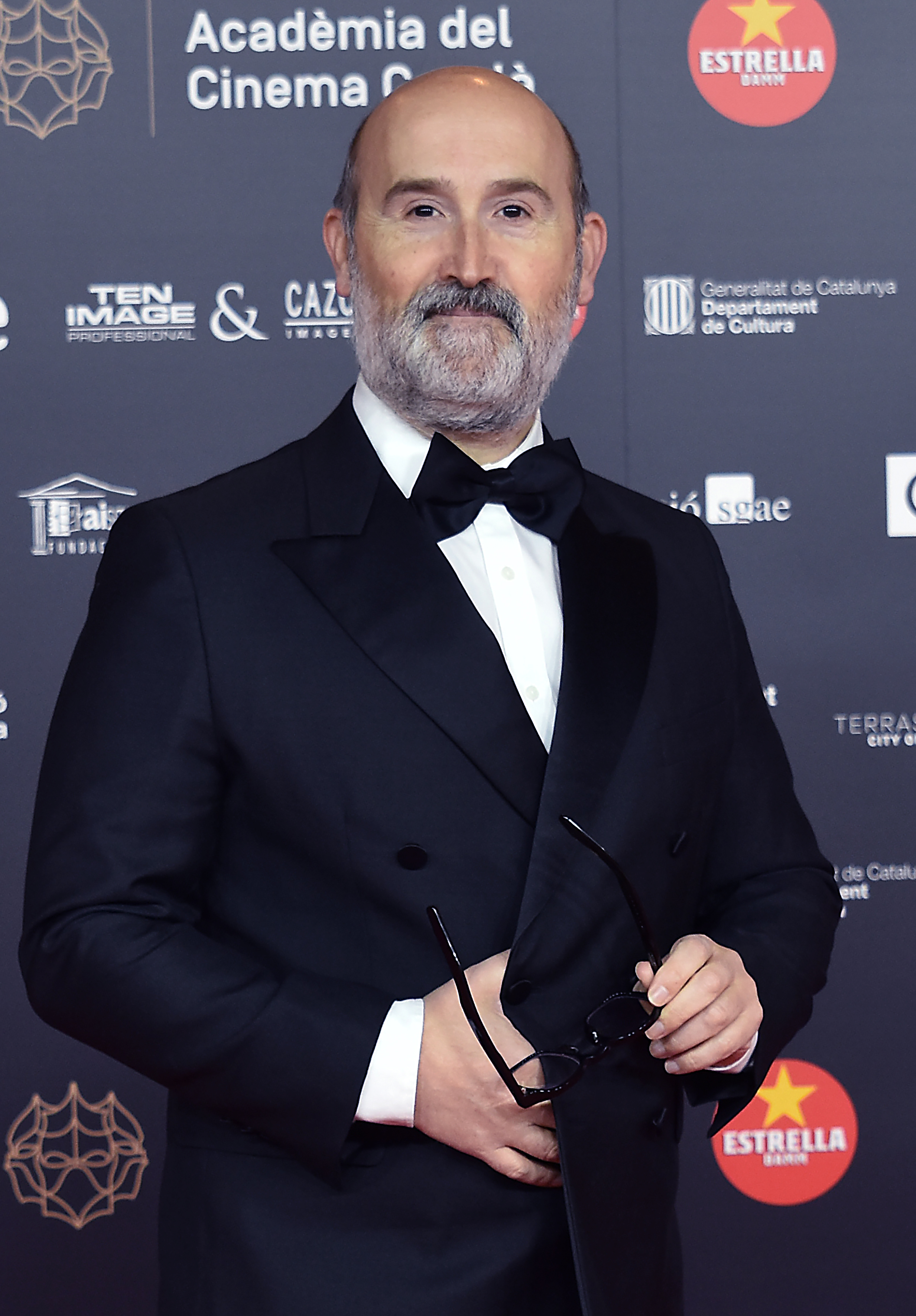
Javier Cámara won in 2021.

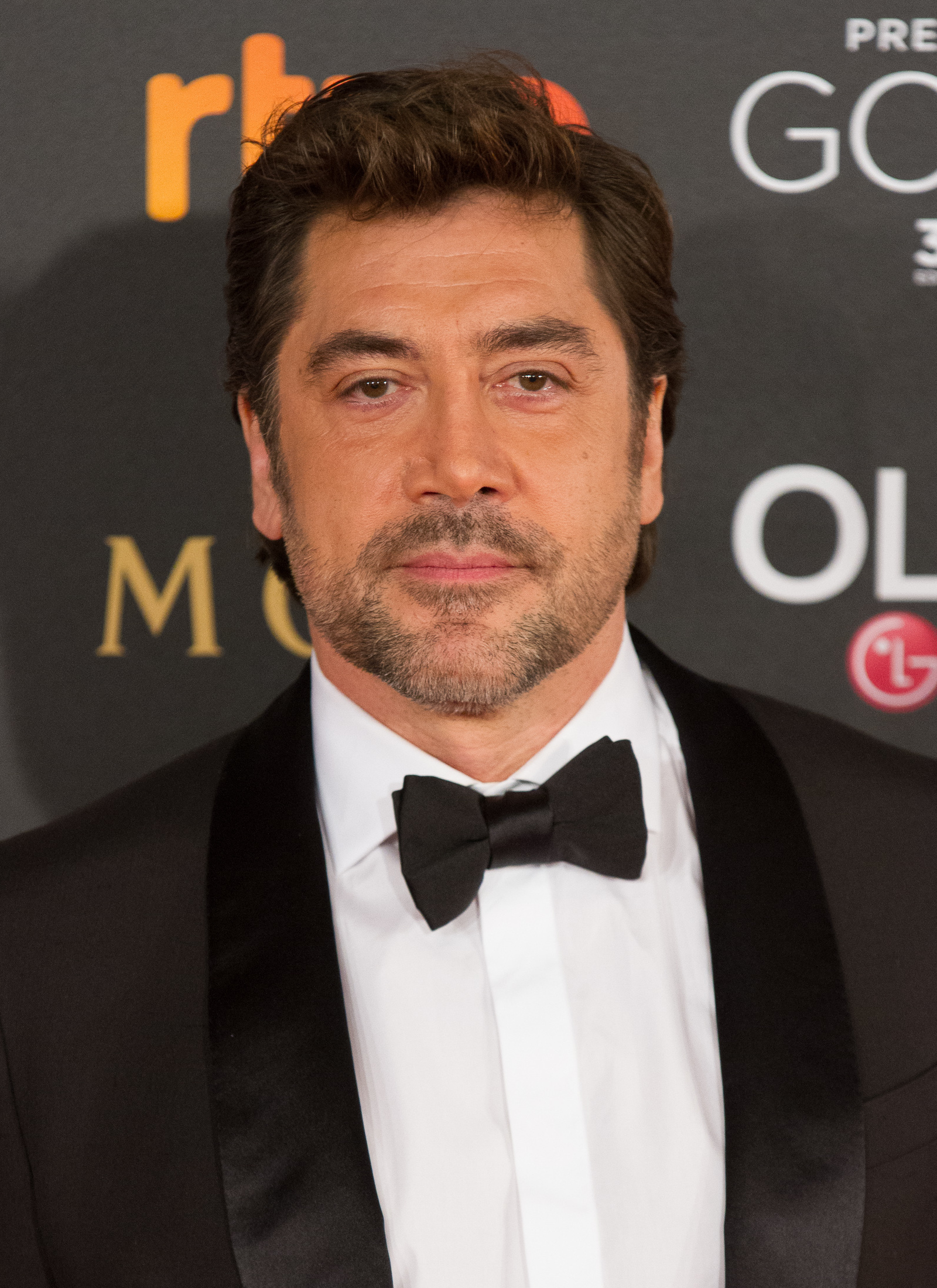
Javier Bardem won in 2022.

Year	Actor	Role(s)	English title	Original title
2020 (7th)
2020 (7th)	(Spain) Antonio Banderas	Salvador Mallo	Pain and Glory	Dolor y Gloria
2020 (7th)	(Argentina) Ricardo Darín	Fermín Perlassi	Heroic Losers	La odisea de los giles
2020 (7th)	(Spain) Karra Elejalde	Miguel de Unamuno	While at War	Mientras dure la guerra
2020 (7th)	(Spain) Antonio de la Torre	Higinio Blanco	The Endless Trench	La trinchera infinita
2021 (8th)	(Spain) Javier Cámara	Héctor Abad Gómez	Forgotten We'll Be	El olvido que seremos
2021 (8th)	(Chile) Alfredo Castro	La loca del frente	My Tender Matador	Tengo miedo torero
2021 (8th)	(Argentina) Diego Peretti	Fernando Araujo	The Heist of the Century	El robo del siglo
2021 (8th)	(Argentina) Miguel Ángel Solá	Ignacio Arrieta	The Crimes That Bind	Crímenes de familia
2022 (9th)	(Spain) Javier Bardem	Julio Blanco	The Good Boss	El buen patrón
2022 (9th)	(Spain) Eduard Fernández	Oscar	Mediterraneo: The Law of the Sea	Mediterráneo
2022 (9th)	(Spain) Luis Tosar	Ibon Etxezarreta	Maixabel	
2022 (9th)	(Brazil) Rodrigo Santoro	Luca	7 Prisoners	7 Prisioneiros
2023 (10th)	(Argentina) Ricardo Darín	Julio César Strassera	Argentina, 1985	
2023 (10th)	(Mexico) Daniel Giménez Cacho	Silverio Gama	Bardo, False Chronicle of a Handful of Truths	Bardo, falsa crónica de unas cuantas verdades
2023 (10th)	(Spain) Luis Tosar	Rafa	On the Fringe	En los márgenes
2023 (10th)	(Argentina) Peter Lanzani	Luis Moreno Ocampo	Argentina, 1985	
2024 (11th)	(Uruguay) Enzo Vogrincic	Numa Turcatti	Society of the Snow	La sociedad de la nieve
2024 (11th)	(Mexico) Damián Alcázar	Ronnie Monroy	The Monroy Affaire	El caso Monroy
2024 (11th)	(Spain) David Verdaguer	Eugenio	Jokes & Cigarettes	Saben aquell
2024 (11th)	(Chile) Jaime Vadell	Augusto Pinochet	El conde	
2024 (11th)	(Argentina) Marcelo Subiotto	Marcelo Pena	Puan	
2025 (12th)	(Spain) Eduard Fernández	Enric Marco	Marco, the Invented Truth	Marco, la verdad inventada
2025 (12th)	(Spain) Luis Tosar	Ángel Salcedo "El Inhumano"	Undercover	La infiltrada
2025 (12th)	(Mexico) Manuel Garcia-Rulfo	Pedro Páramo	Pedro Páramo	
2025 (12th)	(Argentina) Nahuel Pérez Biscayart	Remo Manfredini / Dolores "Lola"	Kill the Jockey	El jockey
2026 (13th)	(Brazil) Wagner Moura	Armando Solimões / Marcelo Alves and Fernando Solimões (adult)	The Secret Agent	O Agente Secreto
2026 (13th)	(Spain) Alberto San Juan	Genaro	The Dinner	La cena
2026 (13th)	(Argentina) Guillermo Francella	Various characters	Homo Argentum	
2026 (13th)	(Colombia) Ubeimar Ríos Gómez	Oscar Restrepo	A Poet	Un poeta

== Multiple nominations ==
The following actors received multiple Best Actor nominations:

Nominations	Actor
4	Ricardo Darín
4	Alfredo Castro
3	Javier Bardem
3	Damián Alcázar
3	Javier Cámara
3	Antonio de la Torre
3	Javier Gutiérrez
3	Luis Tosar
3	Eduard Fernández
2	Daniel Giménez Cacho

== See also ==
- Ariel Award for Best Actor
- Goya Award for Best Actor
