= Platino Award for Best Miniseries or TV series =

- Awarded for: Best Miniseries or TV Series of the Year
- Country: Ibero-America
- Presented by: Entidad de Gestión de Derechos de los Productores Audiovisuales (EGEDA), Federación Iberoamericana de Productores Cinematográficos y Audiovisuales (FIPCA)
- Currently held by: The Eternaut (2026)
- Website: premiosplatino.com

The Platino Award for Best Miniseries or TV series (Spanish: Premio Platino a la mejor teleserie iberoamericana) is one of the Platino Awards, Ibero-America's film awards.

== History ==
The category was first awarded at the 4th Platino Awards in 2017 expanding the categories from awarding only cinema to also television productions. Spanish crime series Four Seasons in Havana was the first recipient of the award.

Since the creation of the category, no series has won more than once. Argentine series El marginal holds the record of most nominations with three, followed by Narcos: Mexico and El Ministerio del Tiempo with two each. Netflix holds the record of most wins in the category with four of the eight winners being productions from said streaming service.

In the list below the winner of the award for each year is shown first, followed by the other nominees.

== Awards and nominations ==
=== 2010s ===
Year	English title	Original title	Country	Network
2017 (4th)	Four Seasons in Havana	Cuatro estaciones en La Habana	Spain	Netflix
2017 (4th)	Bala Loca		Chile	Chilevisión
2017 (4th)	El marginal		Argentina	TV Pública
2017 (4th)	El Ministerio del Tiempo		Spain	La 1
2017 (4th)	Velvet		Spain	Antena 3
2017 (4th)	The Girl	La niña	Colombia	Caracol
2018 (5th)	El Ministerio del Tiempo		Spain	La 1
2018 (5th)	El Maestro		Argentina	El Trece
2018 (5th)	Un gallo para Esculapio		Argentina	Telefe
2018 (5th)	Cable Girls	Las chicas del cable	Spain	Netflix
2018 (5th)	Velvet Colección		Spain	#0
2019 (6th)	Arde Madrid		Spain	Movistar+
2019 (6th)	El marginal		Argentina	TV Pública
2019 (6th)	The House of Flowers	La Casa de las Flores	Mexico	Netflix
2019 (6th)	Narcos: Mexico		Mexico	Netflix

=== 2020s ===
Year	English title	Original title	Country	Network
2020 (7th)	Money Heist	La casa de papel	Spain	Netflix
2020 (7th)	El marginal		Argentina	TV Pública
2020 (7th)	Monzón: A Knockout Blow	Monzón	Argentina	Space
2020 (7th)	Wild District	Distrito Salvaje	Colombia	Netflix
2021 (8th)	Patria		Spain	HBO Europe
2021 (8th)	Someone Has to Die	Alguien tiene que morir	Mexico	Netflix
2021 (8th)	The Great Heist	EL ROBO DEL $IGLO	Colombia	Netflix
2021 (8th)	Riot Police	Antidisturbios	Spain	Movistar+
2022 (9th)	El reino		Argentina	Netflix
2022 (9th)	Isabel		Chile	Mega
2022 (9th)	Luis Miguel: The Series	Luis Miguel: la serie	Mexico	Netflix
2022 (9th)	Narcos: Mexico		Mexico	Netflix
2023 (10th)	News of a Kidnapping	Noticia de un Secuestro	Colombia; Chile	Prime Video
2023 (10th)	Santa Evita		Argentina	Star+
2023 (10th)	El Encargado		Argentina	Star+
2023 (10th)	Yosi, the Regretful Spy	Iosi, el espía arrepentido	Argentina; Uruguay	Prime Video
2024 (11th)	Barrabrava		Argentina; Uruguay	Prime Video
2024 (11th)	Burning Body	El cuerpo en llamas	Spain	Netflix
2024 (11th)	Yosi, the Regretful Spy	Iosi, el espía arrepentido	Argentina	Prime Video
2024 (11th)	Los Mil Días de Allende		Chile; Argentina; Spain	TVN
2025 (12th)	One Hundred Years of Solitude	Cien años de soledad	Colombia	Netflix
2025 (12th)	City of God: The Fight Rages On	Cidade de Deus: A Luta Não Para	Brazil	HBO / Max
2025 (12th)	Senna		Brazil	Netflix
2025 (12th)	Like Water for Chocolate	Como agua para chocolate	Mexico	HBO
2026 (13th)	The Eternaut	El eternauta	Argentina	Netflix
2026 (13th)	The Anatomy of a Moment	Anatomía de un instante	Spain	Movistar Plus+
2026 (13th)	Chespirito: Not Really on Purpose	Chespirito: Sin querer queriendo	Mexico	HBO Max
2026 (13th)	The Dead Girls	Las muertas	Mexico	Netflix

== See also ==
- Latin American television awards
