= The Awakening of the Ants =

2019 film

- Film poster
- Spanish: El despertar de las hormigas
- Directed by: Antonella Sudasassi
- Produced by: Amaya Izquierdo
- Starring: Daniela Valenciano; Leynar Gomez; Adriana Alvarez
- Cinematography: Andrés Campos
- Music by: Sergio de la Puente
- Release date: 12 February 2019 (Berlin)
- Running time: 94 minutes
- Country: Costa Rica
- Language: Spanish

The Awakening of the Ants (Spanish: El despertar de las hormigas) is a 2019 Costa Rican drama film directed by Antonella Sudasassi. It was selected as the Costa Rican entry for the Best International Feature Film at the 92nd Academy Awards, but it was not nominated.

== Plot ==
A young wife and mother's imagination helps her escape societal and domestic oppression.

== Cast ==
- Daniela Valenciano as Isa
- Leynar Gomez as Alcides
- Adriana Alvarez as Vanessa

== See also ==
- List of submissions to the 92nd Academy Awards for Best International Feature Film
- List of Costa Rican submissions for the Academy Award for Best International Feature Film
