= 9th Platino Awards =

- Date: 1 May 2022
- Site: IFEMA Palacio Municipal, Madrid, Spain
- Hosted by: Lali Espósito; Miguel Ángel Muñoz

Highlights
- Honorary Award: Carmen Maura

Television coverage
- Network: RTVE Play, América TV, TNT, Trece

The 9th Platino Awards ceremony, organised by EGEDA and FIPCA, was held on 1 May 2022 at the IFEMA Palacio Municipal in Madrid, Spain. The ceremony was hosted by Lali Espósito and Miguel Ángel Muñoz.

== Background ==
In February 2022, Madrid was disclosed to be the venue of the awards, returning to the Spanish capital after the 8th edition celebrated in October 2021. Soon after, the organizing committee published the 206 pre-selections, to be cut to a shortlist of 20 candidates per category and then to the final 4 nominations for each of the 22 categories of the awards. Regarding the film area, Spain scooped 9% of pre-selections, followed by Argentina, Mexico, Peru, Portugal and Uruguay (all grossing a 6%). In regard of the television area, Mexico dominated with a 16% of pre-selections, followed by Spain (14%) and Argentina and Chile (both 10%). The shortlist was announced on 1 March 2022.

The nominations were announced on 31 March 2022 via YouTube from the Madrid Town Hall by Daniel Guzmán, Darío Yazbek, Edgar Vittorino, Luis Cobos, Rossy De Palma and Stephanie Cayo. Spanish film The Good Boss and Argentine TV series El reino led the nominations with eleven and six respectively. In April 2022, Carmen Maura was announced as the recipient of the honorary award, and Kany García, Lali, Nia, Pedro Fernández and Rozalén as musical performers during the gala. In addition to the aforementioned acts, the gala also featured the unannounced performance of Ana Belén singing a version of "Sólo le pido a Dios".

== Winners and nominees ==
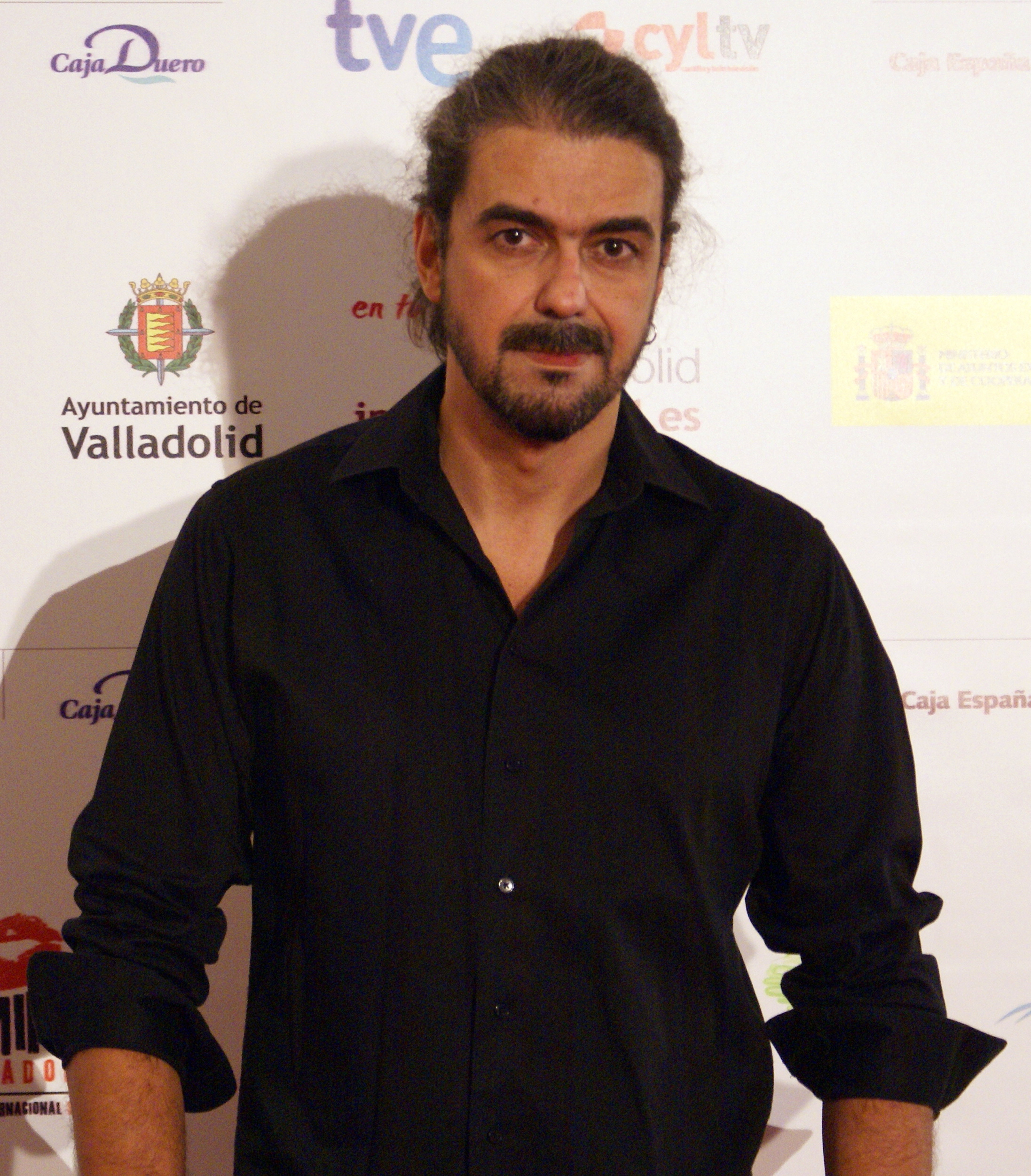
Best Director winner, Fernando León de Aranoa.

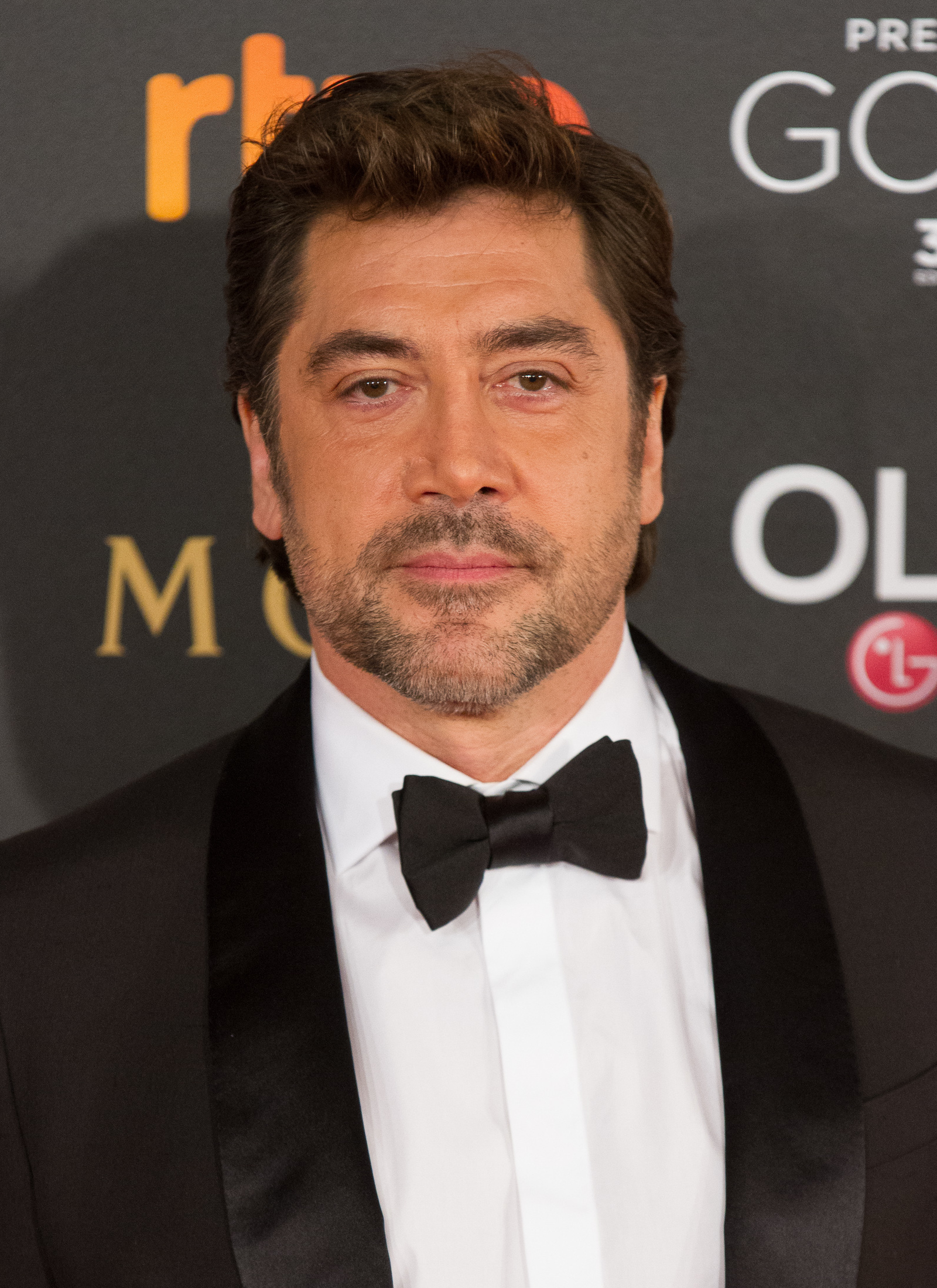
Best Actor in Film winner, Javier Bardem

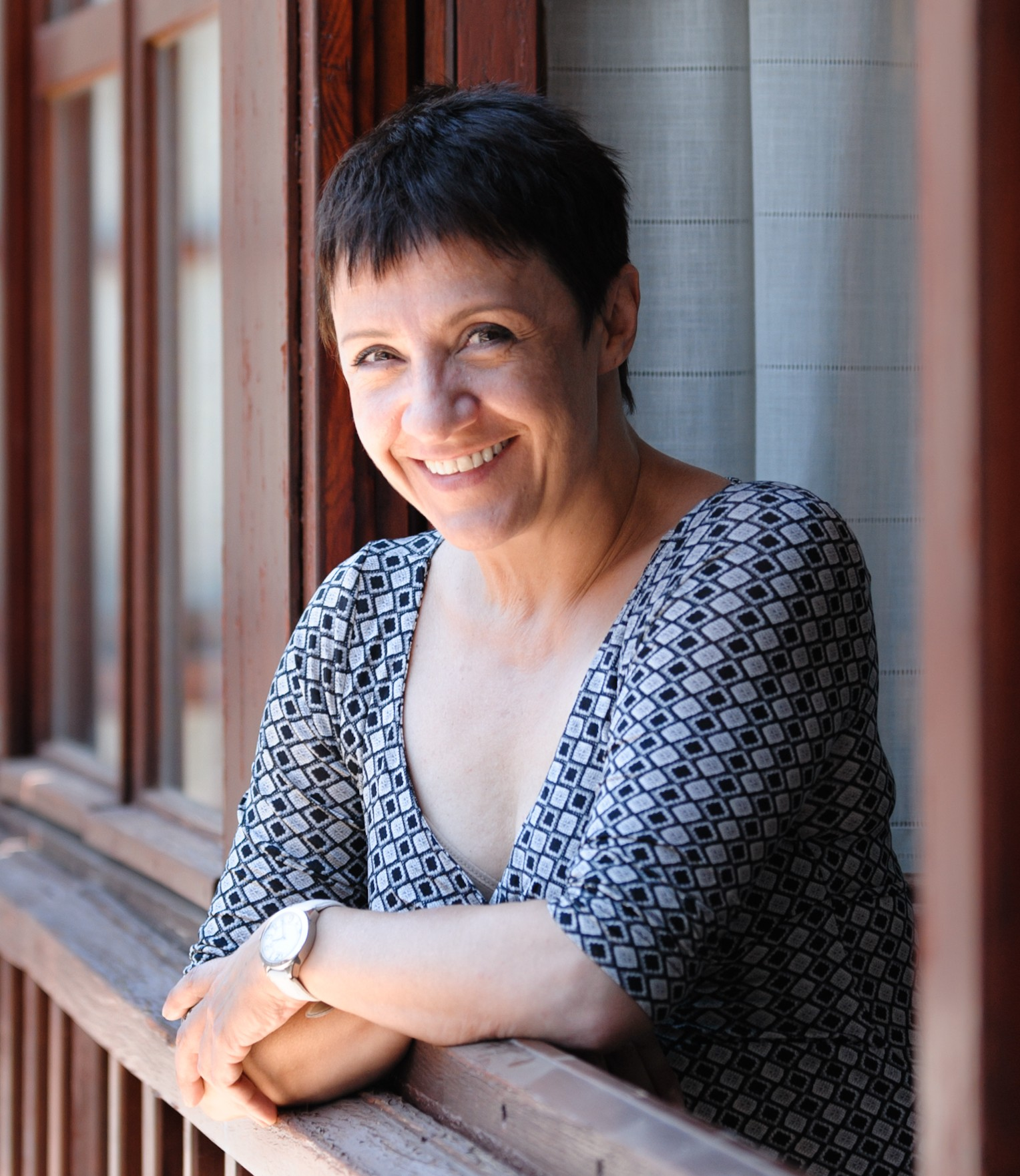
Best Actress in Film winner, Blanca Portillo.

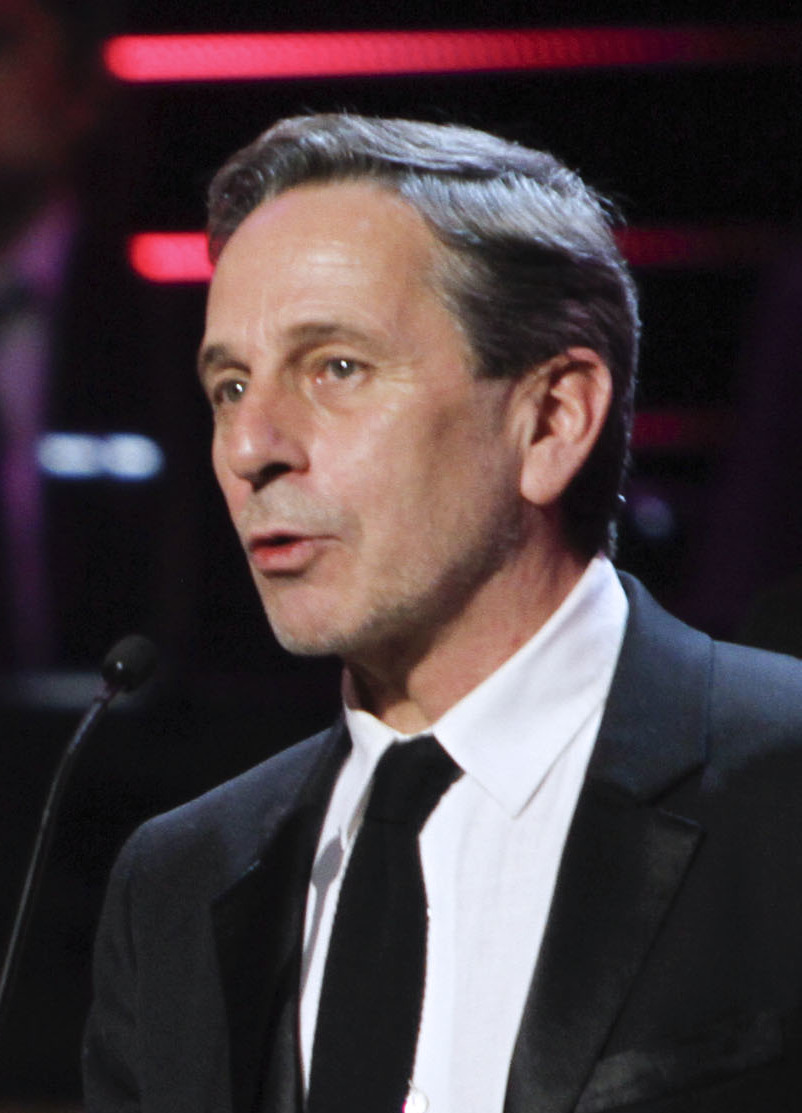
Best Supporting Actor in Film winner, Alfredo Castro.

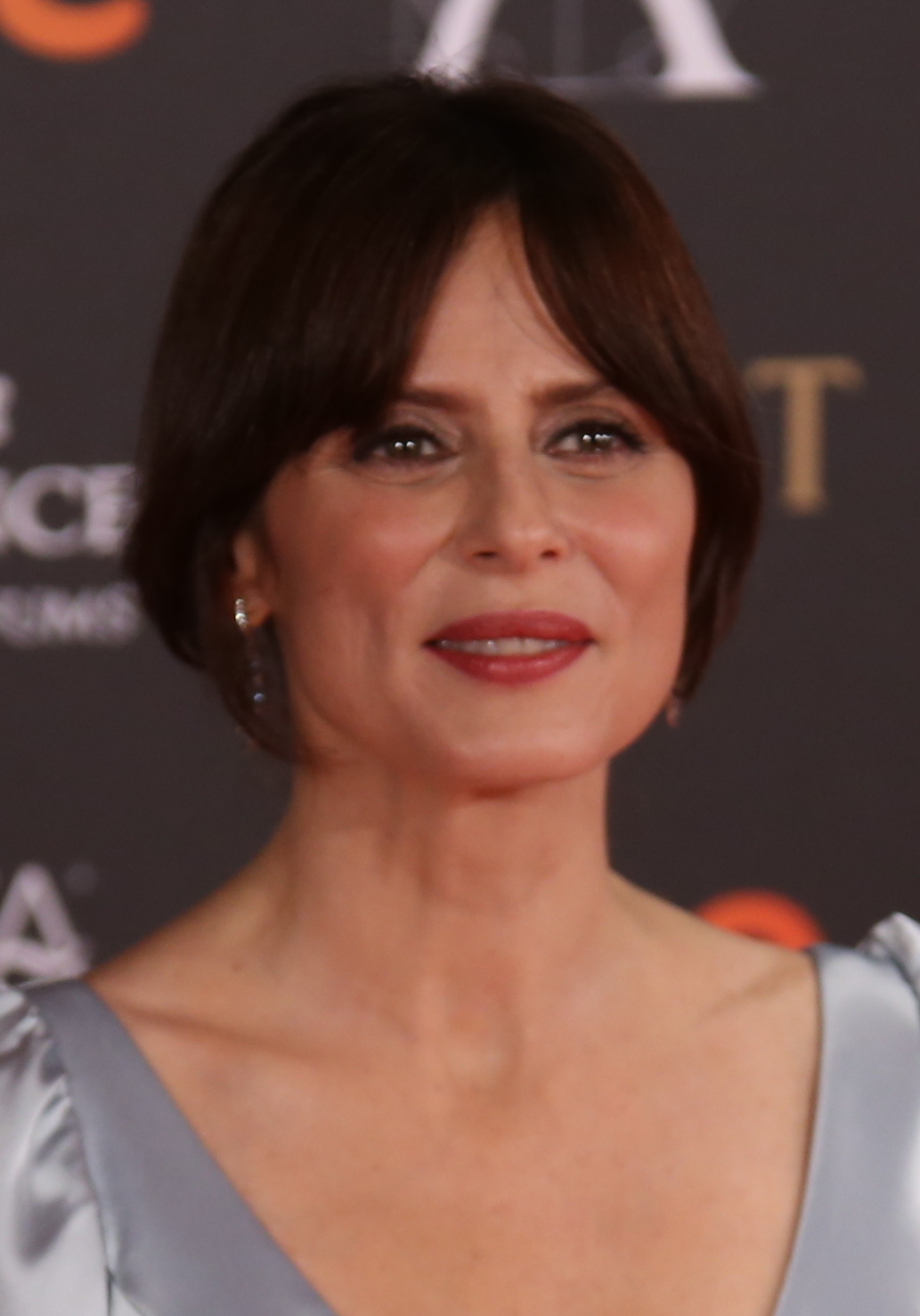
Best Supporting Actress in Film winner, Aitana Sánchez-Gijón.

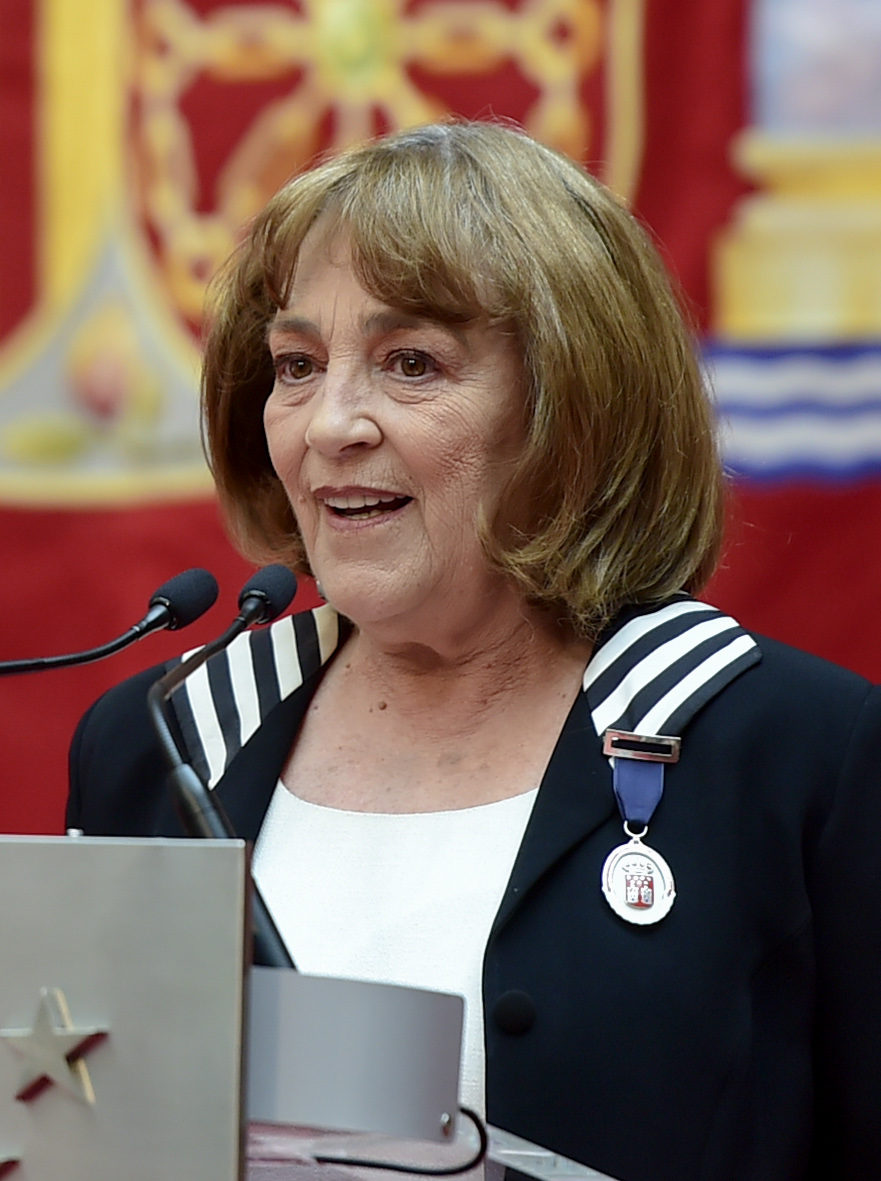
Honorary Award recipient, Carmen Maura.

The winners and nominees are listed as follows:

=== Film ===
Best Ibero-American Film: The Good Boss; Parallel Mothers; Maixabel; Prayers for the Stolen	Best Director: Fernando León de Aranoa – The Good Boss; Icíar Bollaín – Maixabel; Pedro Almodóvar – Parallel Mothers; Tatiana Huezo – Prayers for the Stolen
Best Actor: Javier Bardem – The Good Boss as Julio Blanco; Eduard Fernández – Mediterraneo: The Law of the Sea as Oscar; Luis Tosar – Maixabel as Ibon Etxezarreta; Rodrigo Santoro – 7 Prisoners as Luca	Best Actress: Blanca Portillo – Maixabel as Maixabel Lasa; Ángela Molina – Charlotte as Charlotte; Ilse Salas – Plaza Catedral as Alicia; Penélope Cruz – Parallel Mothers as Janis Martínez Moreno
Best Supporting Actor: Alfredo Castro – Karnawal as El Corto; Christian Malheiros – 7 Prisoners as Mateus; Manolo Solo – The Good Boss as Miralles; Urko Olazabal – Maixabel as Luis Carrasco	Best Supporting Actress: Aitana Sánchez-Gijón – Parallel Mothers as Teresa Ferreras; Almudena Amor – The Good Boss as Liliana; Ana Cristina Ordoñez González – Prayers for the Stolen as Ana (child); Milena Smit – Parallel Mothers as Ana Manso Ferreras
Best Screenplay: Fernando León de Aranoa – The Good Boss; Abner Benaim – Plaza Catedral; Aly Muritiba, Henrique Dos Santos – Private Desert; Isa Campo, Icíar Bollaín – Maixabel	Best Original Score: Alberto Iglesias – Parallel Mothers; César López – Memoria; Kenji Kishi Leopo – Los Lobos; Zeltia Montes – The Good Boss
Best Animated Film: Ainbo: Spirit of the Amazon; Bob Cuspe: Nós Não Gostamos de Gente; Zutik!; Valentina	Best Documentary: A Última Floresta; 100 días con la tata; Who's Stopping Us; Rita Moreno: Just a Girl Who Decided to Go for It
Best Cinematography: Kiko de la Rica – Mediterraneo: The Law of the Sea; Pau Esteve Birba – The Good Boss; Sayombhu Mukdeeprom – Memoria; Sophie Winqvist – Clara Sola	Best Art Direction: Antxón Gómez – Parallel Mothers; Angélica Perea – Memoria; César Macarrón – The Good Boss; Sandra Flores, Alejandro García– Devil Between the Legs
Best Editing: Germano de Oliveira – 7 Prisoners; Nacho Ruiz Capillas – Maixabel; Vanessa Marimbert – The Good Boss; Yordi Capó, Carlos Espinoza Benítez, Samuel Kishi – Los Lobos	Best Sound: Akritchalerm Kalayanamitr – Memoria; Carlos García – Plaza Catedral; Iván Marín, Pelayo Gutiérrez, Valeria Acieri – The Good Boss; Lia Camargo – 7 Prisoners
Best Ibero-American Debut Film: Karnawal; Clara Sola; Libertad; Identifying Features	Film and Education Values: Los Lobos; Maixabel; Mediterraneo: The Law of the Sea; Yo, nena, yo princesa

=== Television ===
Best Ibero-American Miniseries or TV series: The Kingdom; Isabel; Luis Miguel: The Series; Narcos: Mexico	Best Series Creator: Marcelo Piñeyro, Claudia Piñeiro – The Kingdom; Alejandro Amenábar – La Fortuna; Juan José Campanella – The Envoys; Pepe Coira – Hierro
Best Actor in a Miniseries or TV series: Javier Cámara – Venga Juan as Juan Carrasco; Chino Darín – The Kingdom as Julio Clamens; Darío Grandinetti – Hierro as Antonio Díaz; Diego Boneta – Luis Miguel: The Series as Luis Miguel	Best Actress in a Miniseries or TV series: Daniela Ramírez – Isabel as Isabel Allende; Candela Peña – Hierro as Candela Montes; Maribel Verdú – ANA. all in as Ana Tramel; Mercedes Morán – The Kingdom as Elena Vázquez Pena
Best Supporting Actor in a Miniseries or TV series: Joaquín Furriel – The Kingdom as Rubén Osorio; Alberto San Juan – Reyes de la noche as Cerdán; Enric Auquer – Perfect Life as Gari; Karra Elejalde – La Fortuna as Enrique Moliner	Best Supporting Actress in a Miniseries or TV series: Najwa Nimri – Money Heist as Alicia Sierra; María Pujalte – Venga Juan as Macarena; Nancy Dupláa – The Kingdom as Roberta Candia; Rosa María Bianchi – Monarca as Cecilia Dávila Vda. De Carranza

=== Platino Honorary Award ===
- Carmen Maura

== Multiple nominations and awards ==
=== Film ===
The following films received multiple nominations:

Films with multiple nominations
Nominations	Film
11	The Good Boss
9	Maixabel
7	Parallel Mothers
4	7 Prisoners
4	Memoria
3	Prayers for the Stolen
3	Mediterraneo: The Law of the Sea
3	Plaza Catedral
3	Los Lobos
2	Karnawal
2	Clara Sola

Films with multiple awards
Awards	Film
4	The Good Boss
3	Parallel Mothers
2	Karnawal

=== Television ===
Television series with multiple nominations
Nominations	Television series
6	The Kingdom
3	Hierro
2	Isabel
2	Luis Miguel: The Series
2	La Fortuna
2	Venga Juan

Television series with multiple awards
Awards	Television series
3	The Kingdom
