= Killing the Dead =

2019 film

- Film poster
- Directed by: Hugo Giménez
- Starring: Ever Enciso
- Release date: 2019
- Running time: 87 minutes
- Countries: Paraguay; Argentine; France
- Languages: Spanish; Guarani

Killing the Dead (Spanish: Matar a un muerto) is a 2019 political thriller directed by Hugo Giménez. It was selected as the Paraguayan entry for the Best International Feature Film at the 93rd Academy Awards, but it was not nominated.

== Plot ==
During the dictatorship in Paraguay in the 1970s, two men who are secretly burying the dead, realise that one of the corpses is still alive.

== Cast ==
- Ever Enciso
- Aníbal Ortiz
- Silvio Rodas
- Jorge Román

== See also ==
- List of submissions to the 93rd Academy Awards for Best International Feature Film
- List of Paraguayan submissions for the Academy Award for Best International Feature Film
