= The Great Heist =

2020 Spanish language television series

- Spanish: El robo del siglo
- Genre: Crime; Drama; Thriller
- Starring: Andres Parra; Christian Tappán; Marcela Benjumea; Paula Castaño
- Country of origin: Colombia
- Original language: Spanish
- No. of seasons: 1
- No. of episodes: 6

Production
- Running time: 37-48 minutes
- Production company: Dynamo

Original release
- Network: Netflix
- Release: 14 August 2020

The Great Heist (Spanish: El robo del siglo) is a 2020 Colombian television miniseries starring Marcela Benjumea, Paula Castaño and Andres Parra.

== Premise ==
The show is a dramatic interpretation based on the true story of the 1994 heist of the robbery of the national bank El Banco de la Republica (Bank of the Republic) in Valledupar, where the criminals escaped with 33 million US dollars.

== Cast ==
- Marcela Benjumea
- Paula Castaño
- Andres Parra
- Christian Tappan
- Waldo Urrego

== Episodes ==
No.	Title	Original release date
1	"The Big One"	August 14, 2020
2	"The Crew"	August 14, 2020
3	"Punch"	August 14, 2020
4	"Escape from Valledupar"	August 14, 2020
5	"Funny Money"	August 14, 2020
6	"All the Money in the World"	August 14, 2020

== Release ==
The Great Heist was released on 14 August 2020 on Netflix.
