= Ibero-America =

Countries in the Americas that were formerly colonies of Spain or Portugal

- Area: 20,591,128 km^{2} (7,950,279 sq mi)
- Population: 637,714,297
- Demonym: Ibero-American
- Countries: 19: Argentina; Bolivia; Brazil; Chile; Colombia; Costa Rica; Cuba; Dominican Republic; Ecuador; El Salvador; Guatemala; Honduras; Mexico; Nicaragua; Panama; Paraguay; Peru; Uruguay; Venezuela
- Dependencies: Puerto Rico (Note: Territory of the United States of America.)
- Languages: Spanish and Portuguese
- Time zone: UTC−02:00 to UTC−08:00

Ibero-America (Spanish: Iberoamérica, Portuguese: Ibero-América) or Iberian America is generally considered to be the region in the Americas comprising countries or territories where Spanish and Portuguese are predominant languages (usually former territories of Spain and Portugal). Spain and Portugal are themselves sometimes included in some Ibero-American diplomatic circles, such as the Ibero-American Summit and the Organization of Ibero-American States. The Organization of Ibero-American States also includes Spanish-speaking Equatorial Guinea, in Central Africa, but not the Portuguese-speaking African countries. The Latin Recording Academy, the organization responsible for the Latin Grammy Awards, also includes Spain and Portugal, as well as the Latino population of Canada and the United States of America in their definition of Ibero-America.

The prefix Ibero- and the adjective Iberian refer to the Iberian Peninsula in Europe, which includes Portugal and Spain. Ibero-America includes all Hispanic American countries in North, Central and South America, plus the Hispanophone Caribbean, as well as Portuguese-speaking Brazil. Ibero-America makes up the overwhelming bulk of and is synonymous with the common definition of Latin America, but is differentiated from the expanded definition of Latin America by the exclusion of the French-speaking country of Haiti, the French overseas departments of French Guiana, Guadeloupe and Martinique, the former French territories of Quebec and Louisiana, the former Spanish territory known as Florida and the French collectivities of Saint Barthélemy and Saint Martin, which are sometimes included in a few definitions of Latin America. Belize and Guyana, whose official language is English and Dutch-speaking Suriname, Aruba, Bonaire, Curaçao, Saba, Sint Eustatius and Sint Maarten are not considered to be either Iberian American nor Latin American.

Since 1991, the Ibero-American Community of Nations has organized a yearly Ibero-American Summit meeting of the heads of state and governments of the Ibero-American countries, including Spain, Portugal and Andorra, this has since changed to biannually from 2014.

== Countries and population in Ibero-America ==
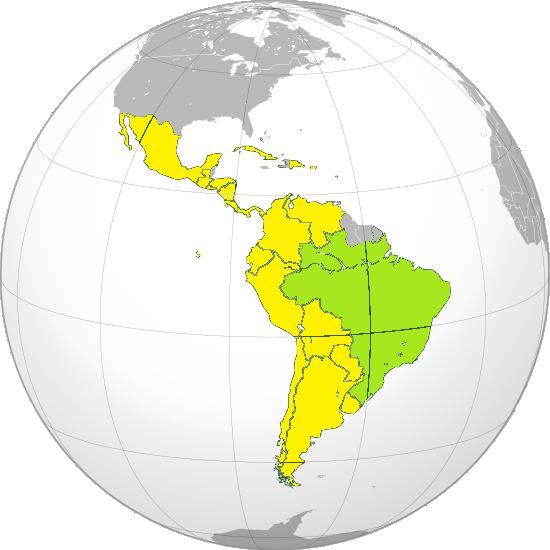
Countries and territories of Ibero-America. In yellow is the Spanish-speaking area and in green is the Portuguese-speaking area of the Americas.

- Spanish-speaking (Sovereign States): (434,651,785 speakers)

Argentina: 47,327,407
Bolivia: 12,186,079
Chile: 19,629,588
Colombia: 52,085,170
Costa Rica: 5,044,197
Cuba: 11,089,511
Dominican Republic: 11,434,005
Ecuador: 17,483,326
El Salvador: 6,602,370
Guatemala: 17,980,803
Honduras: 9,571,352
Mexico: 129,875,529
Nicaragua: 6,359,689
Panama: 4,337,768
Paraguay: 6,218,879
Peru: 34,352,720
Uruguay: 3,444,263
Venezuela: 30,518,260

- Spanish-speaking (Dependent Territory)

Puerto Rico (U.S.): 3,285,874

- Portuguese-speaking (Sovereign States): (203,062,512 speakers)

Brazil: 203,062,512

== See also ==
- Iberian Peninsula
- Hispanic America
- Portuguese America
- Latin America
- Latin Recording Academy
- Organization of Ibero-American States
- Organización de Telecomunicaciones de Iberoamérica (OTI)
- Spanish colonization of the Americas
- Portuguese colonization of the Americas
- Postal Union of the Americas, Spain and Portugal
