= Alfonso Valdivieso =

Colombian lawyer and politician

Senator of Colombia
- In office 20 July 2008 – 20 July 2010
- In office 20 July 1986 – 1 February 1992

24th Permanent Representative of Colombia to the United Nations
- In office 18 September 1998 – 14 January 2003
- President: Andrés Pastrana
- Preceded by: Julio Londoño
- Succeeded by: María Ángela Holguín

2nd Attorney General of Colombia
- In office 17 August 1994 – 8 May 1997
- Nominated by: César Gaviria
- Preceded by: Gustavo de Greiff
- Succeeded by: Alfonso Gómez Méndez

Colombia Ambassador to Israel
- In office 1 February 1992 – 20 March 1993
- President: César Gaviria
- Succeeded by: Patricio Samper

Minister of National Education
- In office 16 August 1990 – 16 November 1991
- President: Virgilio Barco Vargas
- Preceded by: Manuel Becerra
- Succeeded by: Carlos Holmes Trujillo

Member of the Chamber of Representatives
- In office 20 July 1982 – 20 July 1986
- Constituency: Santander

Personal details
- Born: Alfonso Valdivieso Sarmiento; 2 October 1949 (age 77) Bucaramanga, Santander, Colombia
- Party: Radical Change (2006-present)
- Other political affiliations: Liberal; New Liberalism
- Spouse: Marta Cecilia León (1983-present)
- Relations: Luis Carlos Galán (cousin)
- Children: Sergio Valdivieso; Camilo Valdivieso
- Education: Pontifical Xavierian University (LLB); Boston University (MA)
- Profession: Lawyer, Economist

Alfonso Valdivieso Sarmiento (born 2 October 1949) is a Colombian lawyer and politician.

== Biography ==
Alfonso Sarmiento was born in Bucaramanga, Santander to Roberto Valdivieso Serrano and Mercedes Sarmiento Suárez. He attended Divino Niño school and San Pedro Claver school. After graduating from Instituto Tecnológico Santandereano, he moved to Bogotá. He attended Pontifical Xavierian University where he graduated in Law with a concentration in Socio-Political Sciences. Afterwards he moved to the United States where he received a Master of Arts in Global Development Economics (MA GDE) from Boston University, and advanced studies in Urban and Regional Development at Toronto University.

He is the cousin of the late liberal leader Luis Carlos Galán, who was assassinated when he was 39 years old and relative of politicians Juan Manuel Galán, Carlos Fernando Galán and, Claudio Galán.

== Political and diplomatic career ==
As the 2nd Attorney General of Colombia, he brought charges and stood against the administration of Ernesto Samper Pizano during the Proceso 8000. He served as the 24th Permanent Representative of Colombia to the United Nations and as Ambassador of Colombia to Israel. A Radical Change party politician, he was elected Representative and Senator in the Congress of Colombia, and served as Minister of National Education under the administration of Virgilio Barco Vargas.
