= Pachón =

Pachón or Pachon is a surname and a given name. Notable people with the name include:

Surname:

- Adolfo Nicolás Pachón (1936–2020), Spanish Jesuit priest
- Álvaro Pachón (born 1945), Colombian cyclist
- Claudio Galán Pachón (born 1974), Colombian Italian politician & diplomat
- Daniela Pachón (born 1988), Colombian journalist and news presenter
- Gloria Pachón (born 1935), Colombian politician and journalist
- Juan Manuel Galan Pachon (born 1972), Colombian politician
- Julio Rubiano Pachon (1953–2019), Colombian racing cyclist
- Óscar Pachón (born 1987), Colombian professional road cyclist
- Pablo Pachón (born 1983), Colombian football defender
- Sergio Pachón (born 1977), Spanish former professional footballer
- Victor Pachon (1867–1938), French physiologist born in Clermont-Ferrand

Given name:

- Álex Pachón "Álex" Pachón Parraga (born 2000), Spanish professional footballer
- Maruja Pachón Castro (born 1948), Colombia kidnap victim, former Minister for Education
- Olegario Pachón Núñez (1907–1996), Extremaduran anarchist

== See also ==
- Cerro Pachón, mountain in central Chile, in the Coquimbo Region
- Pachón Navarro, Spanish breed of hunting dog from Navarre, northern Spain
- Pashons or Pachon, the ninth month of the ancient Egyptian and Coptic calendars
