= Patricio Samper Gnecco =

Colombian diplomat (1930–2006)

Colombia Ambassador to Israel
- In office 1993 – 2 May 2001
- President: César Gaviria Trujillo
- Preceded by: Alfonso Valdivieso Sarmiento
- Succeeded by: David de La Rosa Pérez

Colombia Ambassador to Bulgaria
- In office 1992–1993
- President: Andrés Pastrana Arango
- Preceded by: Evelio Ramírez Martínez

Personal details
- Born: 1 November 1930 Bogotá, D.C., Colombia
- Died: 5 January 2006 (aged 75) Bogotá, D.C., Colombia
- Party: New Liberalism
- Spouse(s): Beatriz Elvira Salazar Camacho (-1984); Genoveva Carrasco (-1995); Maria José de F. Rodrigues (-2006)
- Relations: Armando Samper Gnecco (brother); Ernesto Samper Pizano (cousin); Cristián T. Samper Kutschbach (nephew)
- Children: Fernando Samper Salazar; Santiago Samper Salazar; Jerónimo Samper Salazar; Ana María Samper Salazar; Mónica Samper Salazar; Arturo Samper Salazar; Paula Samper Salazar; Guillermo Samper Salazar; Estefanía Samper Carrasco; Simón Samper Carrasco
- Education: National University of Colombia (BArch)
- Profession: Architect

Patricio Samper Gnecco (1 November 1930 – 5 January 2006) was a Colombia architect, urbanist and politician. A former Ambassador of Colombia to Israel and former Ambassador of Colombia to Bulgaria, he also served as Councilman for Bogotá from 1980 until 1990.

== Personal life ==
Patricio was born on 1 November 1930 in Bogotá to Santiago Samper Ortega descendant of the O'Donnell dynasty and Blanca Gnecco Fallón. He married Beatriz Elvira Salazar Camacho with whom he had eight children, Santiago, Jerónimo, Ana María, Mónica, Fernando, Arturo, Paula, and Guillermo; they later separated. He later remarried to Genoveva Carrasco with whom he had two children, Estefanía and Simón. After the death of his second wife in 1995, he remarried to Maria José de F Rodrigues who survived him after his death on 5 January 2006 in Bogotá. He was a cousin of Ernesto Samper Pizano
