= 10th Platino Awards =

- Date: 22 April 2023
- Site: IFEMA Palacio Municipal, Madrid, Spain
- Hosted by: Carolina Gaitán; Omar Chaparro; Paz Vega

Highlights
- Best Film: Argentina, 1985
- Honorary Award: Benicio del Toro
- Best Actor: Ricardo Darín; Argentina, 1985
- Best Actress: Laia Costa; Lullaby
- Most awards: Argentina, 1985 (5)
- Most nominations: Argentina, 1985 (14)

Television coverage
- Network: TNT; HBO Max; RTVE

The 10th Platino Awards, presented by the Entidad de Gestión de Derechos de los Productores Audiovisuales (EGEDA) and the Federación Iberoamericana de Productores Cinematográficos y Audiovisuales (FIPCA), took place on 22 April 2023 at IFEMA Palacio Municipal in Madrid, Spain, to recognize the best in Ibero-American film and television of 2022.

The ceremony was hosted by actors Carolina Gaitán, Omar Chaparro and Paz Vega, and was broadcast by TNT and HBO Max to Latin America and RTVE to Spain.

== Background ==
The location and date of the ceremony was announced in September 2022 with the host city being Madrid for the fifth time in the history of the awards, it is also the third consecutive time that the ceremony will take place at IFEMA Palacio Municipal. In February 2023, the pre-selection of films and series was announced. Regarding the film categories, 13% of the pre-selections were from Spain, being the most represented country followed by Argentina (9%), Chile (7%), Mexico (7%), Brazil (6%) and Colombia (6%). In regard of the television area, Mexico has the most pre-selections with 23, followed by Colombia (22), Argentina (20), Spain (19) and Chile (16). It was also announced the introduction of a new category named Best Comedy Film. Later in the month, the longlists were announced with 20 films or series in each category.

The nominations were announced on 9 March 2023 with Argentine film Argentina, 1985 receiving a record-breaking fourteen nominations, followed by The Beasts, Lullaby and Bardo, False Chronicle of a Handful of Truths, all three with six nominations. Puerto Rican actor Benicio del Toro is set to receive the Platino Honorary Award.

Santiago Mitre's Argentina 1985 received the most awards with five, followed by The Beasts with four, and Lullaby and Utama, with two awards each. Colombian-Chilean series News of a Kidnapping received four awards, tying with Patria as the series with the most awards in a ceremony. The ceremony featured several musical numbers from different artists who performed famous Latin American songs. In addition, singers Sebastián Yatra, Lucrecia and Blanca Paloma also performed, with the latter singing "Eaea", the Spanish entry for the Eurovision Song Contest 2023.

== Winners and nominees ==
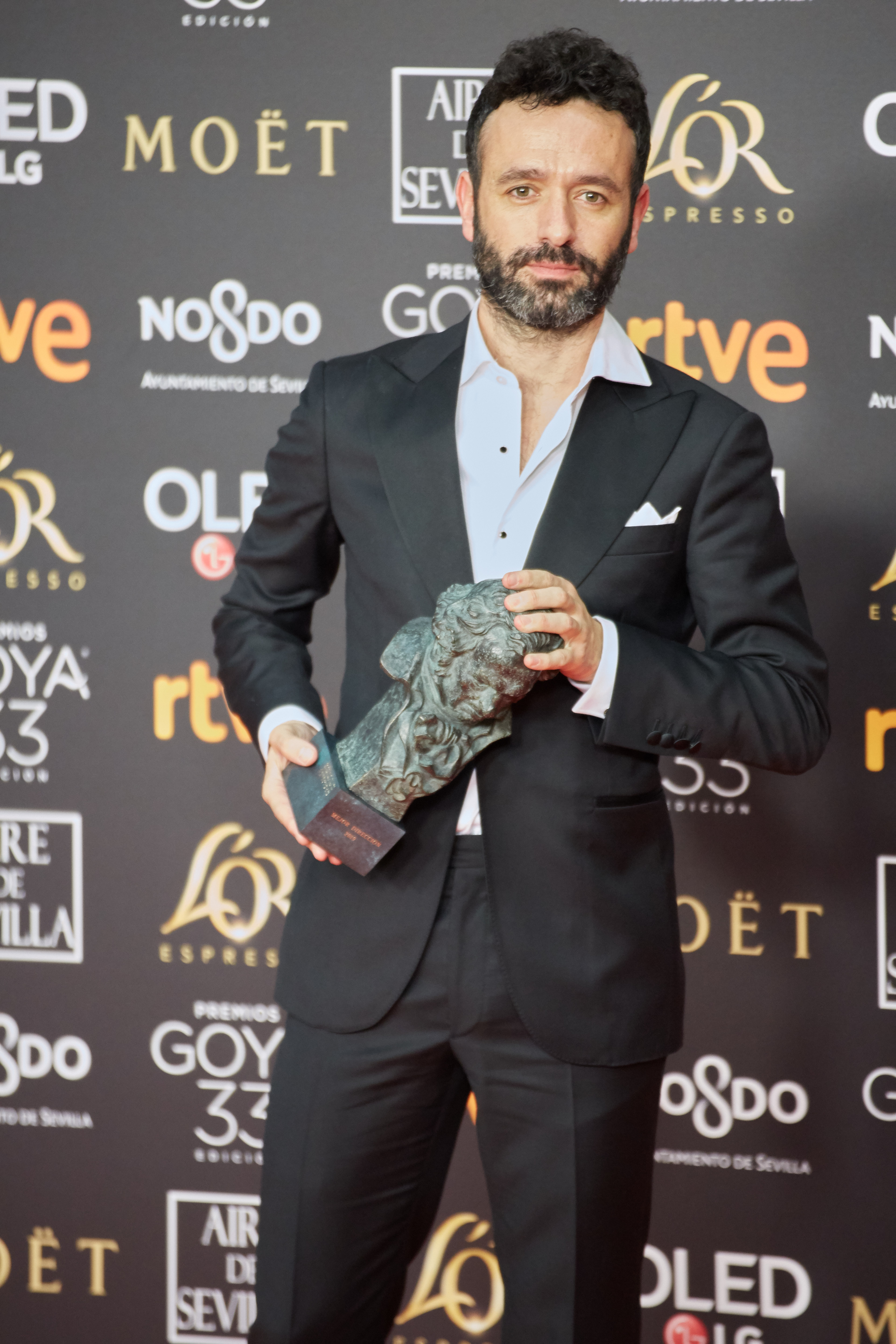
Rodrigo Sorogoyen, Best Director winner.

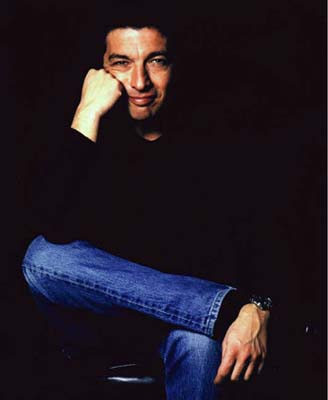
Ricardo Darín, Best Actor winner.

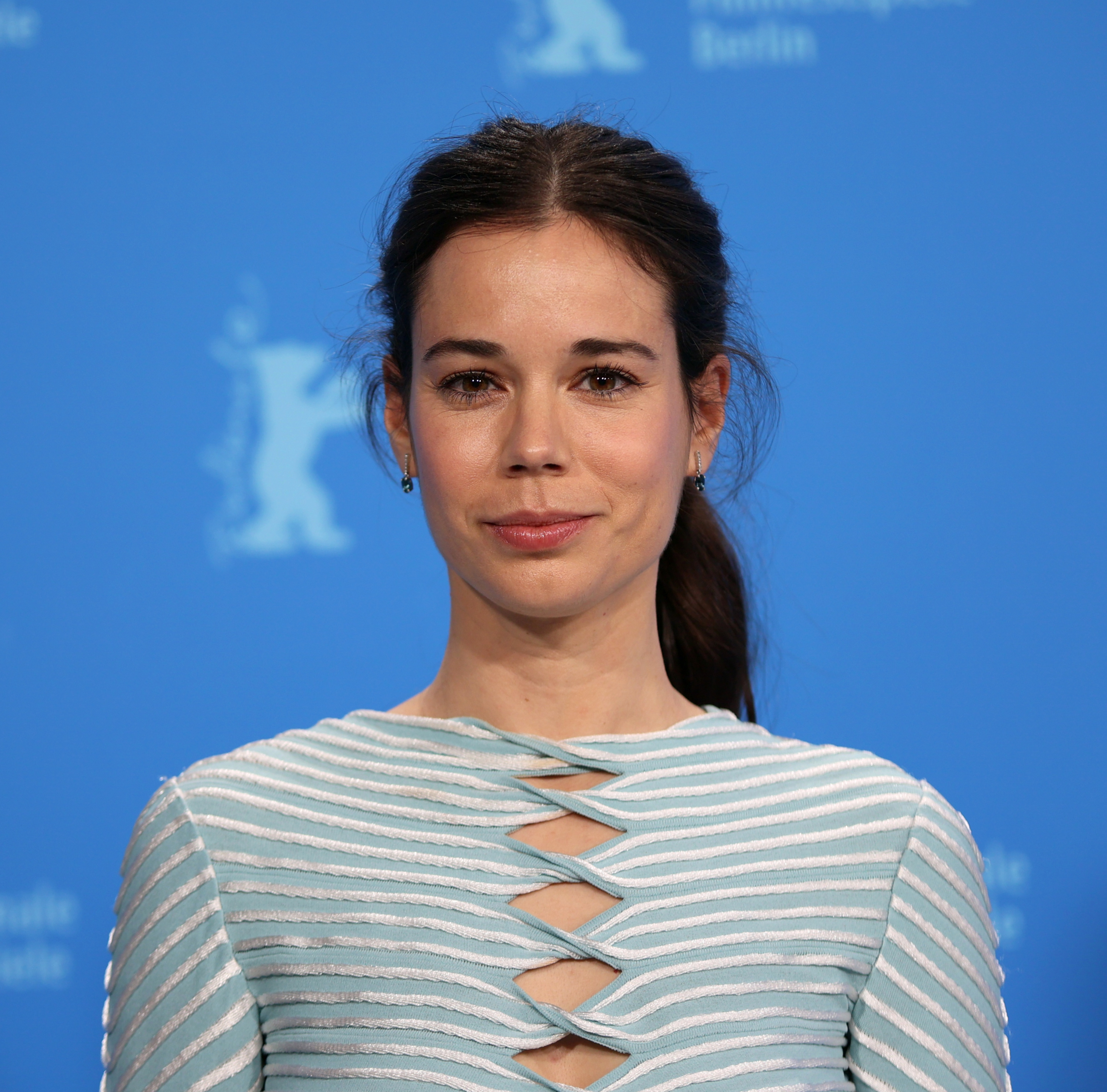
Laia Costa, Best Actress winner.

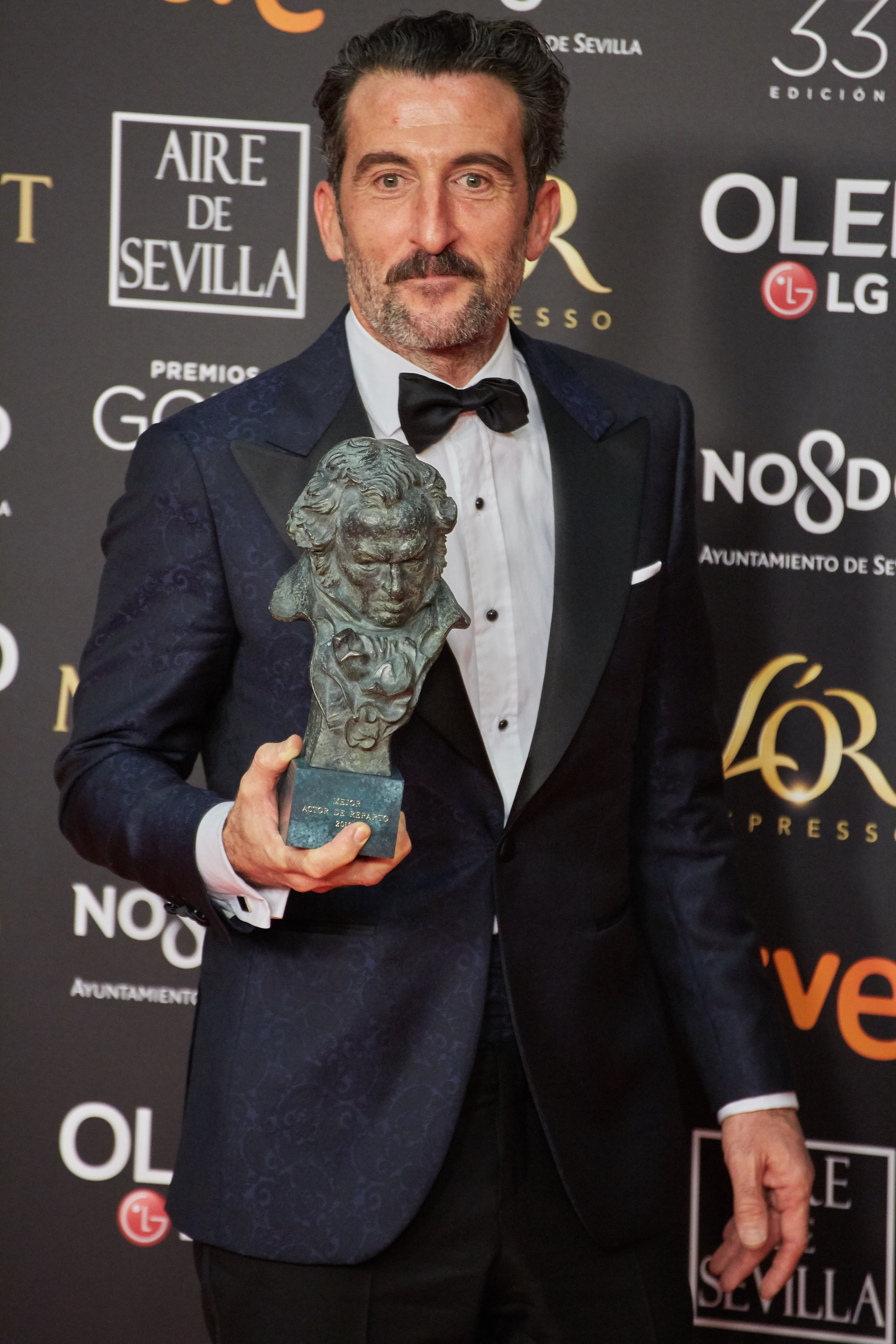
Luis Zahera, Best Supporting Actor winner.

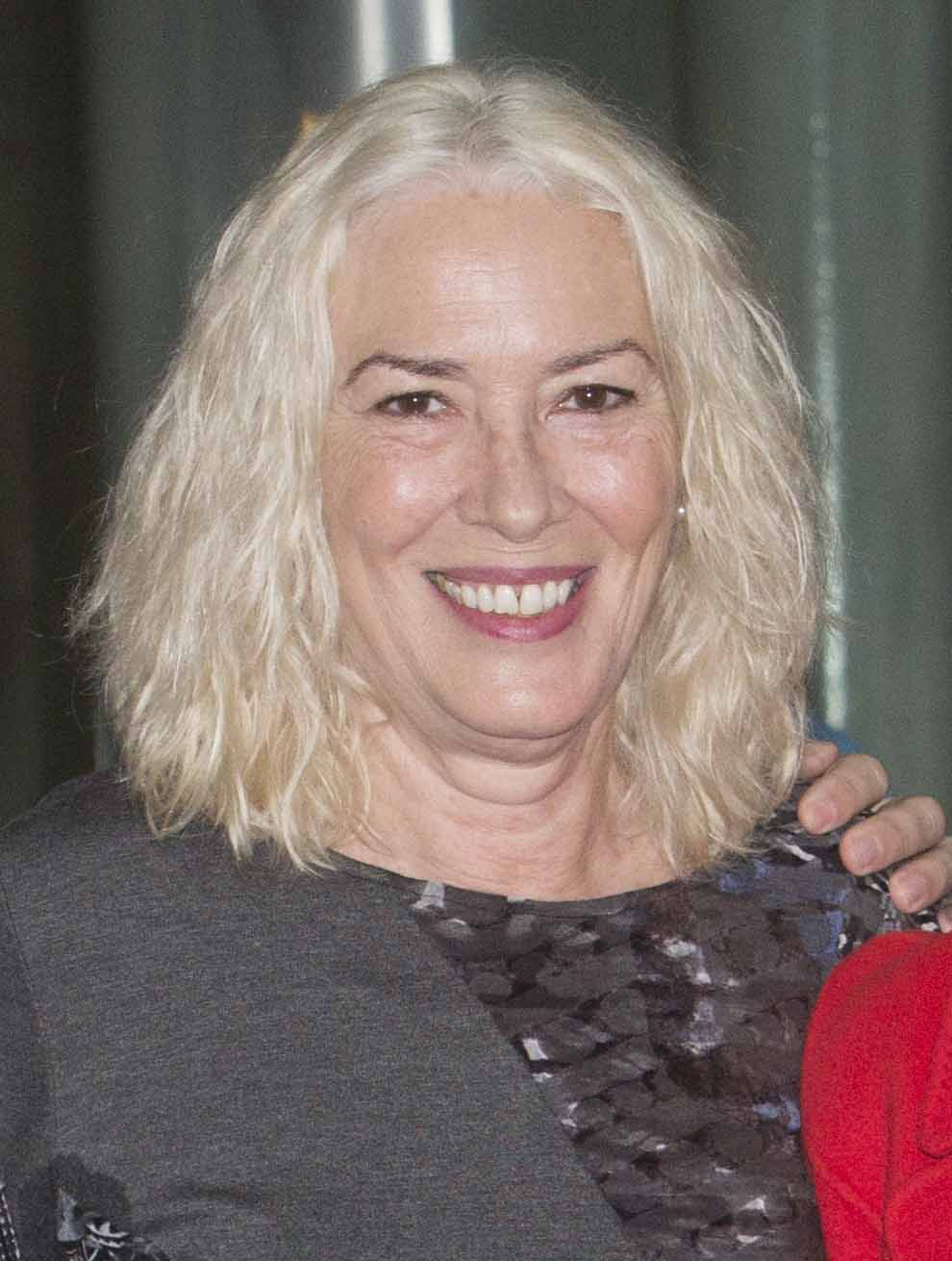
Susi Sánchez, Best Supporting Actress winner.

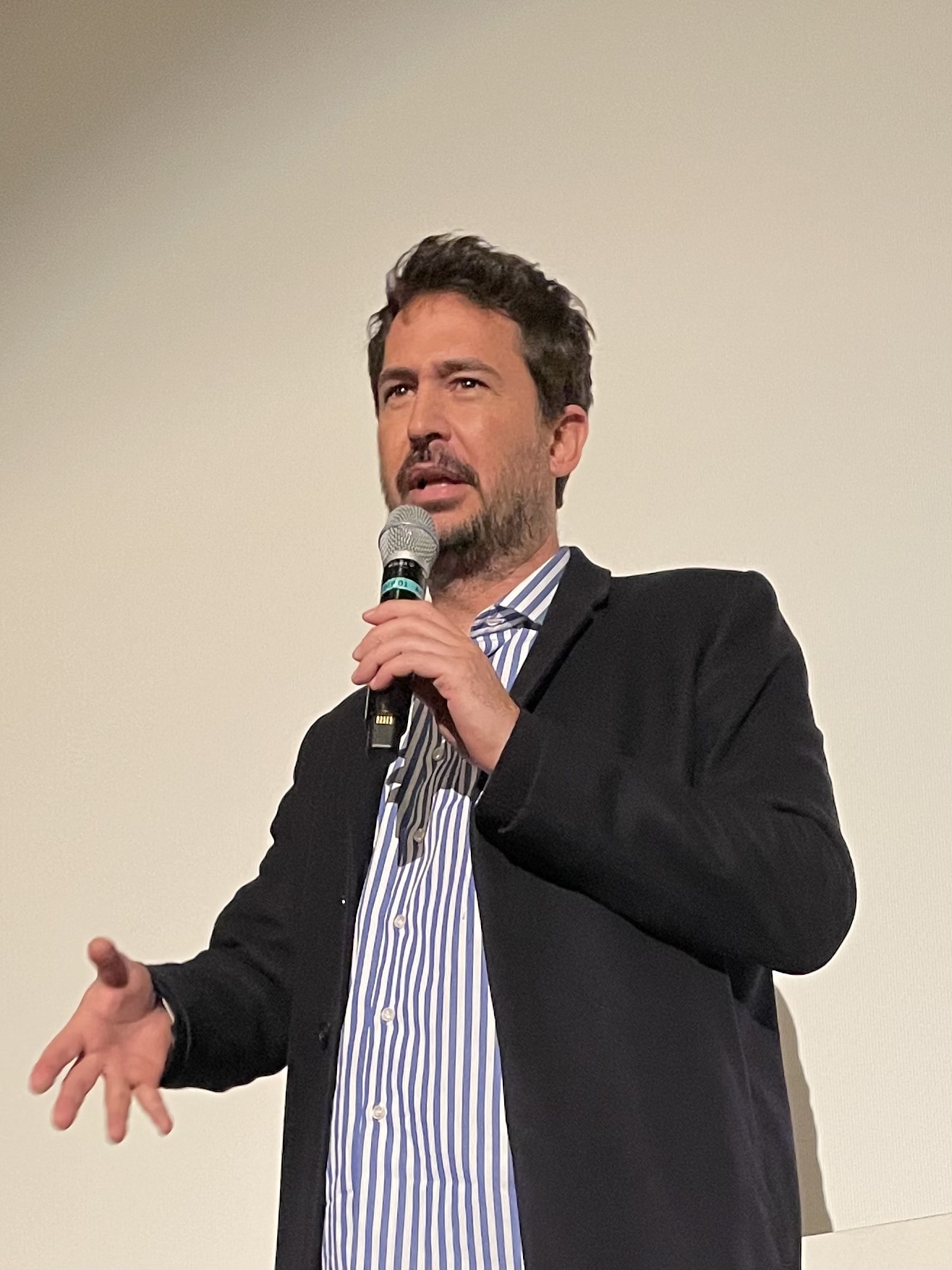
Santiago Mitre, Best Screenplay co-winner.

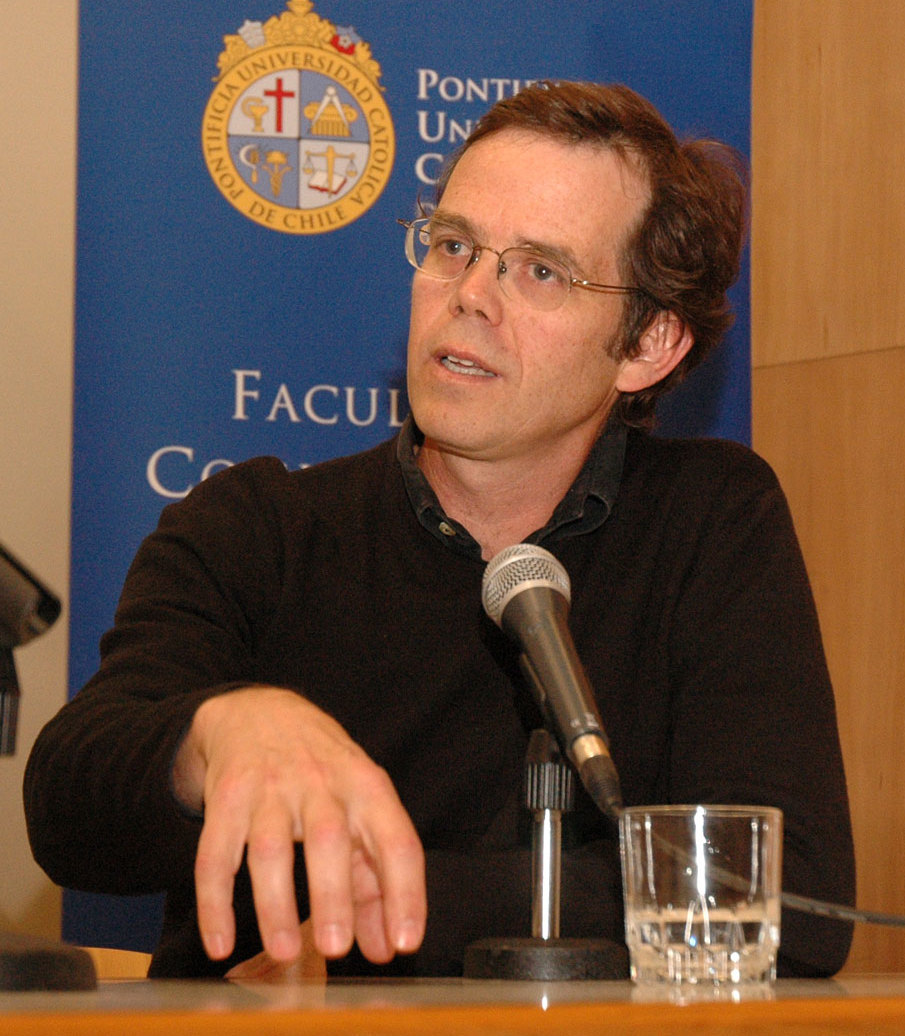
Andrés Wood, Best Series Creator co-winner.

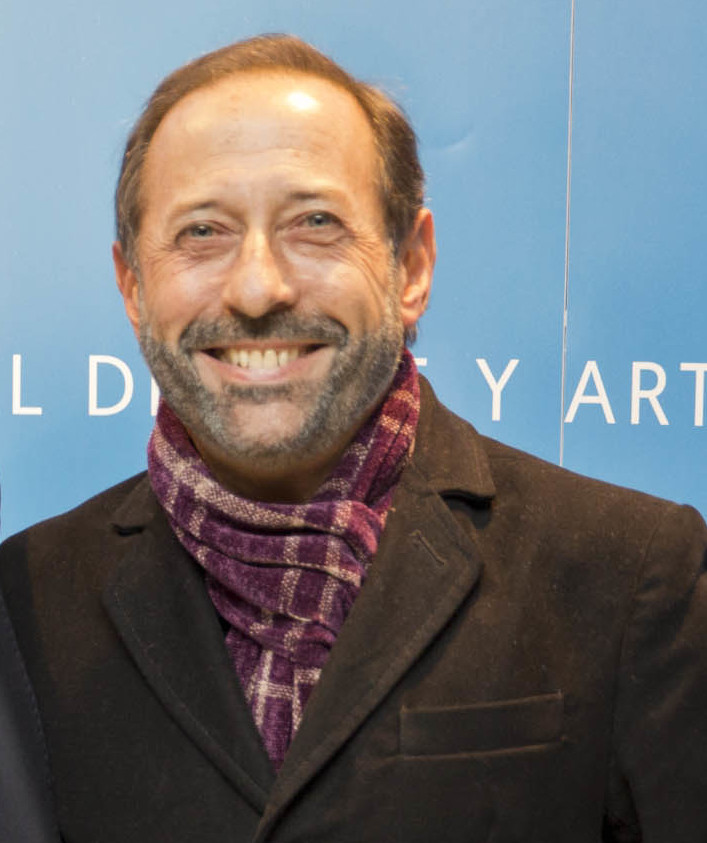
Guillermo Francella, Best Actor in a Miniseries or TV series winner.

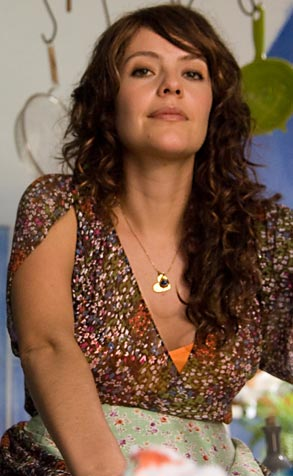
Cristina Umaña, Best Actress in a Miniseries or TV series winner.

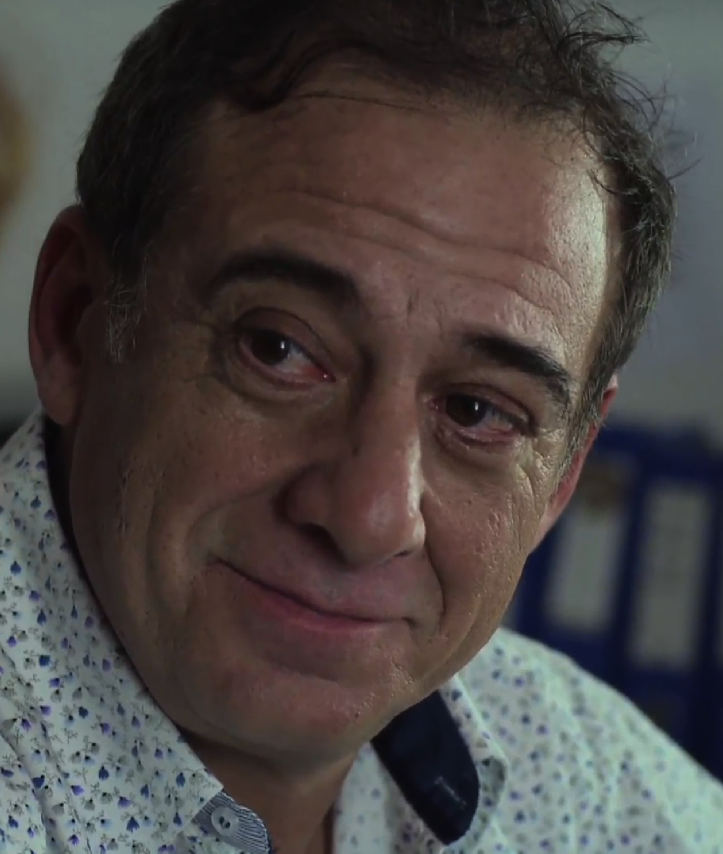
Alejandro Awada, Best Supporting Actor in a Miniseries or TV series winner.

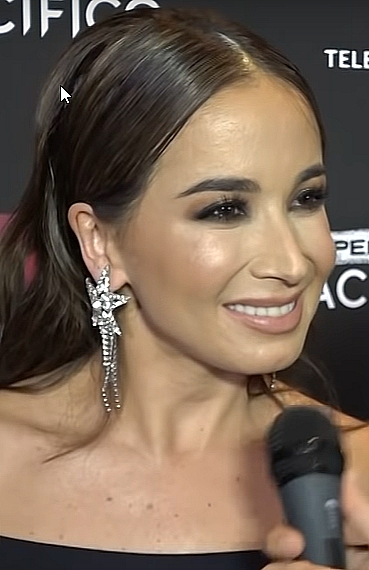
Majida Issa, Best Supporting Actress in a Miniseries or TV series winner.

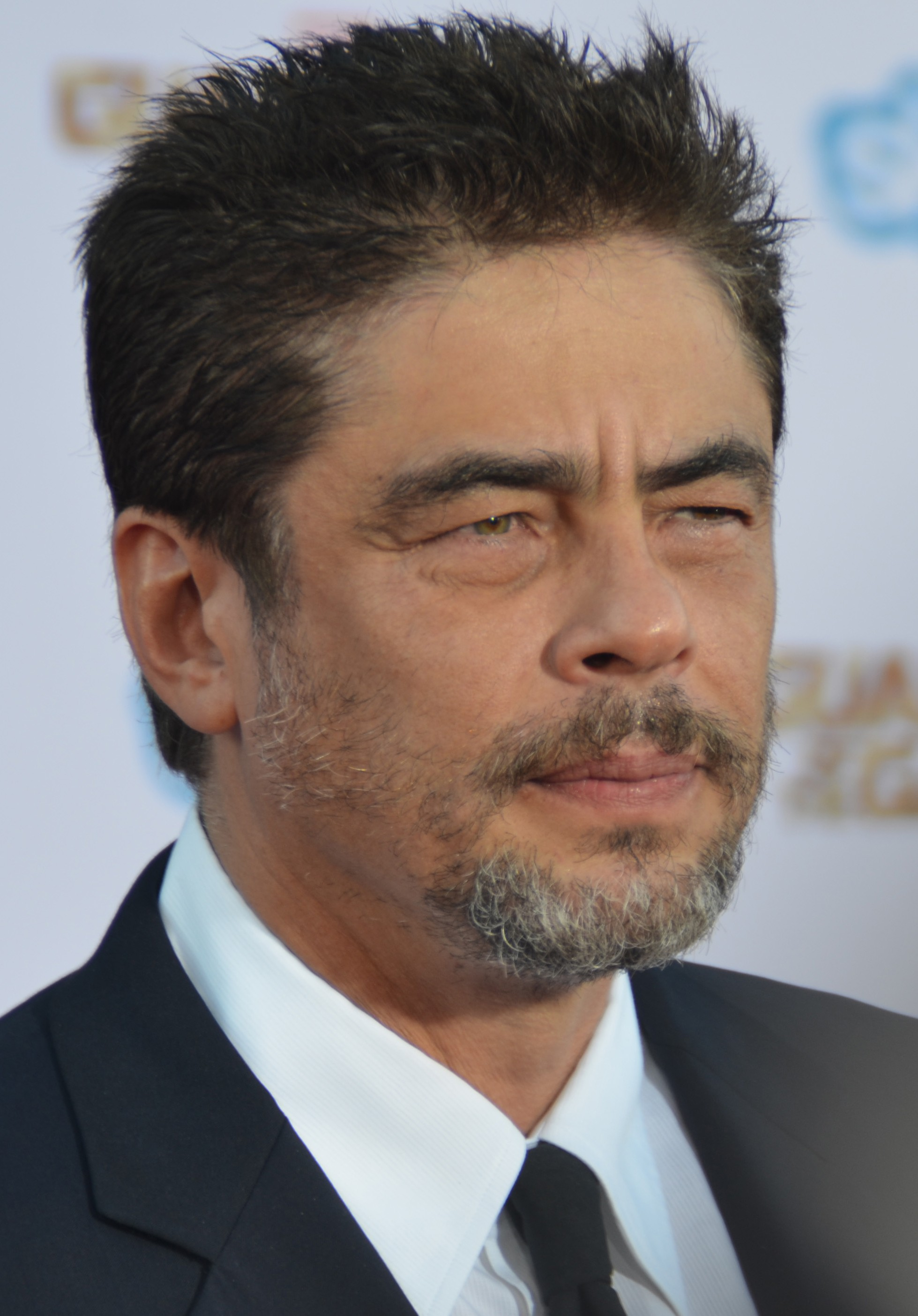
Benicio del Toro, Honorary Award recipient.

The nominees were announced on 9 March 2023. Winners are listed first and in bold.

=== Film ===
**Best Ibero-American Film**: **Argentina, 1985**; Alcarràs; The Beasts; Bardo, False Chronicle of a Handful of Truths	**Best Director**: **Rodrigo Sorogoyen – The Beasts**; Carla Simón – Alcarràs; Santiago Mitre – Argentina, 1985; Alejandro González Iñarritu – Bardo, False Chronicle of a Handful of Truths
**Best Actor**: **Ricardo Darín as Julio César Strassera in Argentina, 1985**; Daniel Giménez Cacho as Silverio Gama in Bardo, False Chronicle of a Handful of Truths; Luis Tosar as Rafa in On the Fringe; Peter Lanzani as Luis Moreno Ocampo in Argentina, 1985	**Best Actress**: **Laia Costa as Amaia in Lullaby**; Aline Kuppenheim as Carmen in 1976; Antonia Zegers as Ana in The Punishment; Laura Galán as Sara in Piggy; Magnolia Núñez as Yarisa in Carajita
**Best Supporting Actor**: **Luis Zahera as Xan in The Beasts**; Carlos Portaluppi as León Carlos Arslanián in Argentina, 1985; Norman Briski as Ruso in Argentina, 1985; Ramón Barea as Koldo in Lullaby	**Best Supporting Actress**: **Susi Sánchez as Begoña in Lullaby**; Alejandra Flechner as Silvia Strassera in Argentina, 1985; Carmen Machi as Asun in Piggy; Penélope Cruz as Azucena in On the Fringe
**Best Screenplay**: **Argentina, 1985 – Santiago Mitre, Mariano Llinás**; Bardo, False Chronicle of a Handful of Truths – Alejandro González Iñarritu, Nicolás Giacobone; The Beasts – Rodrigo Sorogoyen, Isabel Peña; 1976 – Manuela Martelli, Alejandra Moffat	**Best Original Score**: **Utama – Cergio Prudencio**; Lullaby – Aránzazu Calleja; The Kings of the World – Leonardo Heiblum, Alexis Ruíz; Argentina, 1985 – Pedro Osuna
**Best Animated Film**: **Águila y Jaguar: Los Guerreros Legendarios**; El paraíso; Tad, the Lost Explorer and the Emerald Tablet; Unicorn Wars	**Best Documentary**: **El caso Padilla**; Bosco; Eami; The Silence of the Mole; My Imaginary Country
**Best Cinematography**: **Utama – Bárbara Álvarez**; Alcarràs – Daniela Cajías; The Kings of the World – David Gallego; Argentina, 1985 – Javier Juliá	**Best Art Direction**: **Argentina, 1985 – Micaela Saiegh**; Bardo, False Chronicle of a Handful of Truths – Eugenio Caballero; 1976 – Francisca Correa; Prison 77 – Pepe Domínguez del Olmo
**Best Editing**: **The Beasts – Alberto del Campo**; Argentina, 1985 – Andrés Pepe Estrada; Prison 77 – José M. G. Moyano; The Kings of the World – Sebastián Hernández, Gustavo Vasco	**Best Sound**: **The Beasts – Aitor Berenguer, Fabiola Ordoyo, Yasmina Praderas**; The Kings of the World – Carlos García; Utama – Federico Moreira; Argentina, 1985 – Santiago Fumagalli
**Best Ibero-American Debut Film**: **1976**; Lullaby; Daughter of Rage; The Pack; Utama	**Film and Education Values**: **Argentina, 1985**; Lullaby; The Substitute; Utama
**Best Ibero-American Comedy Film**: **Official Competition**; All Hail; Bardo, False Chronicle of a Handful of Truths; Off-Lined

==== Films with multiple nominations and wins ====
The following films received multiple wins:

Wins	Films	Country
5	Argentina, 1985	Argentina
4	The Beasts	Spain
2	Lullaby	Spain
2	Utama	Bolivia, Uruguay

The following films received multiple nominations:

Nominations	Films	Country
14	Argentina, 1985	Argentina
6	The Beasts	Spain
6	Lullaby	Spain
6	Bardo, False Chronicle of a Handful of Truths	Mexico
5	Utama	Bolivia, Uruguay
4	1976	Chile, Argentina
4	The Kings of the World	Colombia, Mexico
3	Alcarràs	Spain
2	Piggy	Spain
2	Prison 77	Spain
2	On the Fringe	Spain

=== Television ===
**Best Ibero-American Miniseries or TV series**: **News of a Kidnapping · Colombia, Chile (Prime Video)**; El Encargado · Argentina (Star+); Yosi, the Regretful Spy · Argentina (Prime Video); Santa Evita · Argentina (Star+)	**Best Series Creator**: **Andrés Wood, Rodrigo García – News of a Kidnapping (Prime Video)**; Daniel Burman – Yosi, the Regretful Spy (Prime Video); Leonardo Padrón – The Marked Heart (Netflix); Gastón Duprat, Mariano Cohn – El Encargado (Star+)
**Best Actor in a Miniseries or TV series**: **Guillermo Francella as Eliseo in El Encargado (Star+)**; Daniel Giménez Cacho as Fernando Barrientos in An Unknown Enemy (Prime Video); Juan Diego Botto as Pablo Lopetegui in I Don't Like Driving (TNT); Juan Pablo Raba as Alberto Villamizar in News of a Kidnapping (Prime Video)	**Best Actress in a Miniseries or TV series**: **Cristina Umaña as Maruja Pachón in News of a Kidnapping (Prime Video)**; Claudia Di Girolamo as Cecilia Montes in 42 Days of Darkness (Netflix); Natalia Oreiro as Eva Perón in Santa Evita (Star+); Paulina Gaitán as Irene in Belascoarán (Netflix)
**Best Supporting Actor in a Miniseries or TV series**: **Alejandro Awada as Saúl Menajem in Yosi, the Regretful Spy (Prime Video)**; Andrés Parra as Cerevro in Belascoarán (Netflix); David Lorente as Lorenzo I Don't Like Driving (TNT); Rodrigo Celis as Don Pacho in News of a Kidnapping (Prime Video)	**Best Supporting Actress in a Miniseries or TV series**: **Majida Issa as Diana Turbay in News of a Kidnapping (Prime Video)**; Amparo Noguera as Nora Figueroa in 42 Days of Darkness (Netflix); Leonor Watling as Iria in I Don't Like Driving (TNT); Veronica Echegui as Ane Uribe in Intimacy (Netflix)

==== Series with multiple nominations and wins ====
The following series received multiple wins:

Wins	Series	Country
4	News of a Kidnapping	Colombia, Chile

The following series received multiple nominations:

Nominations	Series	Country
6	News of a Kidnapping	Colombia, Chile
3	El Encargado	Argentina
3	Yosi, the Regretful Spy	Argentina
3	I Don't Like Driving	Spain
2	42 Days of Darkness	Chile
2	Santa Evita	Argentina
2	Belascoarán	Mexico

=== Platino Honorary Award ===
- **Benicio del Toro**

== Presenters and performers ==
The following individuals, listed in order of appearance, presented awards.

=== Presenters ===
Presenters
Name(s)	Role
Martina Gusmán; Benjamín Vicuña	Presented the award for Best First Feature Film
Esmeralda Pimentel; Diego Calva	Presented the award for Best Supporting Actor and Best Supporting Actress
Juanita Arias; Rubén Cortada	Presented the award for Best Animated Film
Sebastián Yatra; Vanesa Martín	Presented the award for Best Original Score
Natalia Reyes; Bárbara Paz	Presented the award for Best Documentary
Manolo Caro; Pablo Trapero	Presented the award for Best Director
Cecilia Suárez; Ernesto Alterio	Presented the awards for Best Actor in a Miniseries or TV series and Best Actress in a Miniseries or TV series
Juan Carlos Arciniegas	Presented the award for Best Art Direction
Fernando Tejero	Presented the award for Best Film Editing
Sara Linares	Presented the award for Best Sound
Cayetana Guillén Cuervo	Presented the award for Best Cinematography
Zurab Pololikashvili; Nerea Barros; Alejandro Echegaray	Presented the award for Film and Education Values Award
Enrique Cerezo	Presented the award for Platino Honorary Award
Eduardo Noriega; Nashla Bogaert	Presented the award for Best Comedy Film
Yany Prado; Juan Minujín	Presented the award for Best Series Creator
Juana Acosta; Jorge Perugorría	Presented the award for Best Screenplay
Ludwika Paleta; Georgina Amorós	Presented the awards for Best Supporting Actor in a Miniseries or TV series and Best Supporting Actress in a Miniseries or TV series
Alfonso Herrera; Clara Lago	Presented the awards for Best Actor and Best Actress
Martha Higareda; Carlos Torres; Ana de la Reguera	Presented the award for Best Miniseries or TV series
Aislinn Derbez; Óscar Jaenada	Presented the award for Best Ibero-American Film

=== Performers ===
Artist(s)	Song(s)
Lucrecia	"Sazón"
Michel Brown	"Lamento Boliviano"
Carolina Gaitán	"La Bicicleta"
Letrux Alejandro Claveaux	"País Tropical"
Clara Alvarado Mane de la Parra	"Me Gustas Mucho"
Reynaldo Pacheco	"La Flor de la Canela"
Sebastián Yatra	"Una Noche sin Pensar"
Blanca Paloma	"Eaea"
Alicia Banquez	"Ojalá Que Llueva Café"

== See also ==
- 37th Goya Awards
