= News of a Kidnapping =

Book by Gabriel García Márquez

- First edition (Colombian)
- Author: Gabriel García Márquez
- Language: Spanish
- Genre: Non-fiction
- Publication date: 1996
- Publication place: Colombia

News of a Kidnapping (original Spanish title: Noticia de un secuestro) is a non-fiction book by Gabriel García Márquez. It was first published in Spanish in 1996, with an English translation released in 1997.

== Contents ==
The book recounts the kidnapping, imprisonment, and eventual release of a handful of prominent figures in Colombia in the early 1990s by the Medellín Cartel, a drug cartel founded and operated by Pablo Escobar.

The book begins with an account of the abductions of Maruja Pachón and Beatriz Villamizar de Guerrero the evening of 7 November 1990. People presume that Maruja was kidnapped because her sister is Gloria Pachón, widow of the journalist and New Liberalism founder Luis Carlos Galán. Beatriz is Maruja's sister-in-law and her personal assistant.

The book then examines the first in a series of related kidnappings. On 30 August 1990, Diana Turbay, director of the TV news program Criptón and magazine Hoy x Hoy, was abducted along with four members of her news team. They include editor Azucena Liévano, writer Juan Vitta, and camera operators Richard Becerra and Orlando Acevedo. German journalist Hero Buss was also with them when they were taken. Turbay was the daughter of former Colombian president and Liberal Party leader Julio César Turbay. She died, likely by friendly fire, on 25 January 1991 in a police rescue raid on the compound where she was being held.

The kidnappings on 18 September 1990 of Marina Montoya and Francisco Santos Calderón, editor in chief of El Tiempo newspaper, are also recounted.

== Mir Hossein Moussavi ==
"If you want to understand my situation, read Gabriel Garcia Marquez's News of a Kidnapping", Iranian opposition leader Mir Hossein Moussavi was quoted as having said in a meeting with his daughters in September 2011. Moussavi, together with his wife, Zahra Rahnavard, has been under house arrest since February 2011. After a week, some Persian book reference websites reported that News of a Kidnapping was among the best-selling "rare books" in Iran.

== TV adaptation ==
On 22 August 2022, a six-episode miniseries based on the book was released on Prime Video. A Colombian-Chilean co-production, it is directed by Julio Jorquera Arriagada and Andrés Wood, and stars Cristina Umaña as Maruja Pachón, Juan Pablo Raba as Alberto Villamizar and Majida Issa as Diana Turbay. The series won four awards at the 10th Platino Awards, including Best Ibero-American Miniseries or TV series.
