= 2022 Colombian parliamentary election =

Legislative election held in Colombia

- 13 March 2022
- Chamber of Representatives
- 187 of the 188 seats in the Chamber of Representatives
- Turnout: 45.86% (▼1.39pp)
Party	Leader	Vote %	Seats	+/–
Historic Pact	Gustavo Bolívar	17.62	28	+13
Liberal	Lidio García Turbay	14.08	32	−3
Conservative	David Barguil	12.47	25	+4
Democratic Centre	Álvaro Uribe	10.20	16	−16
Party of the U	Roy Barreras	8.68	5	−20
Radical Change	Arturo Char Chaljub	7.95	16	−14
Green Alliance		6.59	11	+2
CCE		2.69	2	New
MIRA–CJL		1.74	1	New
New Liberalism	Juan Manuel Galán	1.70	1	New
LIGA	Rodolfo Hernández Suárez	1.04	2	New
PHxC–AV		0.90	2	New
CR–CJL–MIRA		0.82	1	New
PCC–U		0.67	1	New
PCC–CD		0.60	1	New
CR–MIRA		0.51	1	New
Civic Force		0.43	1	New
PLC–CJL		0.41	1	New
PRC		0.38	1	New
AV–PDA		0.36	2	+2
GM		0.33	1	New
Together for Caldas		0.22	1	New
Commons	Timoleón Jiménez	0.13	5	0
U–CJL		0.04	1	New
Afro-Colombian seats
PVTMG		14.07	1	+1
Independent	Fernando Ríos Hidalgo	8.48	1	New
Indigenous seat
MAIS		42.26	1	0
This lists parties that won seats. See the complete results below.
- Senate
- 107 of the 108 seats in the Senate
- Turnout: 47.04% (▼0.95pp)
Party	Vote %	Seats	+/–
Historic Pact	16.95	20	+10
Conservative	13.18	15	+1
Liberal	12.43	14	0
Hope Center–Green Alliance	11.53	13	+4
Democratic Centre	11.48	13	−6
Radical Change	9.47	11	−5
Party of the U	8.87	10	−4
MIRA-CJL	3.44	4	−2
Commons	0.15	5	0
Indigenous seats
MAIS	30.40	1	0
AICO	21.60	1	0
This lists parties that won seats. See the complete results below.

Congressional elections were held in Colombia on 13 March 2022.

== Electoral system ==
Of the 166 members of the House of Representatives, 162 were elected by proportional representation from 33 multi-member constituencies based on the departments, with seats allocated using the largest remainder method. Two members were elected by the Afro-Colombian community, one by the Indigenous community, and one by Colombian expatriates. The 102 Senators were elected by two methods; 100 from a single nationwide constituency by proportional representation (with seats allocated using the largest remainder) and two from a two-seat constituency for Indigenous Colombians.

Commons, the political successor of the former rebel group FARC, were guaranteed five seats in the House and five in the Senate as part of the Colombian peace process. For the first time, 16 seats in the House, as agreed to during the negotiations in Havana and ratified by an act of legislation on 25 August 2021, were reserved for victims of the Colombian conflict. Citizens from 167 municipalities affected by the conflict were eligible for voting in the special victims constituency.

== Results ==
=== Senate ===
Party	Votes	%	Seats
Historic Pact for Colombia	2,880,254	16.95	20
Colombian Conservative Party	2,238,678	13.18	15
Colombian Liberal Party	2,112,528	12.43	14
Hope Center–Green Alliance	1,958,369	11.53	13
Democratic Center	1,949,905	11.48	13
Radical Change	1,609,173	9.47	11
Union Party for the People	1,506,567	8.87	10
MIRA–Fair and Free Colombia	584,806	3.44	4
Civic Force	431,166	2.54	0
New Liberalism	368,345	2.17	0
We are Ready Colombia	115,120	0.68	0
SOS Colombia	56,767	0.33	0
New People Movement	37,063	0.22	0
National Salvation Movement	31,289	0.18	0
Commons	25,708	0.15	5
Metapolitical Unitary Movement	12,165	0.07	0
Presidential election runner-up			1
Blank votes	1,072,401	6.31	–
Total	16,990,304	100.00	106
Valid votes	16,990,304	93.04	
Invalid votes	1,270,720	6.96	
Total votes	18,261,024	100.00	
Registered voters/turnout	38,819,901	47.04	
Indigenous seats
Indigenous and Social Alternative Movement	89,199	30.40	1
Indigenous Authorities of Colombia	63,373	21.60	1
Colombian Indigenous Party	28,312	9.65	0
Environmental Mandate	14,825	5.05	0
Association of Indigenous Councils for Colombia	13,580	4.63	0
Campo Alegre Protection	4,749	1.62	0
National Association of Cabildos and Indigenous Authorities in Colombia	3,757	1.28	0
Ancestral Socio-Political Organisation	2,052	0.70	0
Democracia Desde Abajo La Palma	1,580	0.54	0
Blank votes	71,978	24.53	–
Total	293,405	100.00	2
Valid votes	293,405	78.09	
Invalid votes	82,303	21.91	
Total votes	375,708	100.00	

=== Chamber of Representatives ===
Party	Votes	%	Seats
Historic Pact for Colombia	2,922,409	17.62	28
Colombian Liberal Party	2,335,426	14.08	32
Colombian Conservative Party	2,068,076	12.47	25
Democratic Center	1,692,491	10.20	16
Union Party for the People	1,439,579	8.68	15
Radical Change	1,319,437	7.95	16
Green Alliance	1,093,836	6.59	11
Hope Center Coalition	445,549	2.69	2
MIRA–Fair and Free Colombia	288,617	1.74	1
New Liberalism	282,271	1.70	1
League of Anti-Corruption Governors	172,342	1.04	2
Historic Pact–Green Alliance	149,218	0.90	2
Radical Change–Fair and Free Colombia–MIRA	136,622	0.82	1
Colombian Conservative Party–Union Party for the People	111,497	0.67	1
Colombian Conservative Party–Democratic Center	99,138	0.60	1
Radical Change–MIRA	84,704	0.51	1
Civic Force	71,075	0.43	1
Colombian Liberal Party–Fair and Free Colombia	68,468	0.41	1
Colombia Renaissance Party	62,490	0.38	1
Alternativos (AV–PDA)	60,527	0.36	2
Union Party for the People–MIRA–Fair and Free Colombia	60,412	0.36	0
Radical Change–Fair and Free Colombia	58,674	0.35	0
Independent Movement of Absolute Renovation	56,911	0.34	0
Gente en Movimiento	54,933	0.33	1
National Salvation Movement	38,123	0.23	0
Together for Caldas (ASI–D–NL–MIRA)	36,479	0.22	1
Radical Change–CJL–MIRA–Union Party for the People	34,743	0.21	0
MIRA–Democratic Center–Fair and Free Colombia	32,514	0.20	0
AV–Hope Center Coalition	31,873	0.19	0
Union Party for the People–MIRA–CJL–ASI	30,022	0.18	0
Colombian Conservative Party–CJL–MIRA	29,947	0.18	0
Human Colombia Political Movement	29,845	0.18	0
Colombian Conservative Party–CJL–MSN	24,162	0.15	0
Commons	21,423	0.13	5
MIRA–CJL–MSN	18,165	0.11	0
Dignity	16,431	0.10	0
Independent Social Alliance	12,765	0.08	0
MIRA–Democratic Center	11,688	0.07	0
Union Party for the People–MIRA–Radical Change	9,549	0.06	0
Union Party for the People–Fair and Free Colombia	6,612	0.04	1
The Change is Me Digital Movement	6,234	0.04	0
Colombian Liberal Party–Independent Social Alliance	4,018	0.02	0
Force Colombia (Colombia Renaissance Party–ASI)	2,371	0.01	0
National Salvation Movement–Fair and Free Colombia	1,853	0.01	0
Indigenous Authorities of Colombia	629	0.00	0
Fair and Free Colombia	41	0.00	0
Vice-presidential runner-up			1
Blank votes	1,053,480	6.35	–
Total	16,587,669	100.00	169
Valid votes	16,587,669	93.17	
Invalid/blank votes	1,215,344	6.83	
Total votes	17,803,013	100.00	
Registered voters/turnout	38,819,901	45.86	
Afro-Colombian seats
Palenque de la Vereda las Trecientas y del Municipio de Galapa	66,474	14.07	1
Fernando Ríos Hidalgo	40,049	8.48	1
CC de la Comunidad Negra Limones	39,924	8.45	0
CC La Toma	25,602	5.42	0
CC Manuel Zapata Olivella De San Antero	25,322	5.36	0
CC Afrozabaletas	20,189	4.27	0
CC de la Costa Pacífica "Concosta"	12,605	2.67	0
CC Bocas del Atrato y Leoncito	12,306	2.60	0
CC la Voz de Los Negros	11,730	2.48	0
CC de Comunidades Negras De Guayabal	11,081	2.35	0
Organización Étnica de Comunidades Afros los Palenkes	9,285	1.97	0
CC Mayor de Casimiro	7,834	1.66	0
CC Mayor de Certegui	7,654	1.62	0
CC de Comunidades Negras de Campo Hermoso	6,181	1.31	0
Partido Colombia Renaciente	6,152	1.30	0
CC Bocas de Taparal	5,270	1.12	0
Somos Identidad	5,031	1.06	0
Movimiento Alianza Democrática Amplia	4,298	0.91	0
CC Integral de Lloró	4,263	0.90	0
CC de la Comunidad Negra de Villa Gloria	4,074	0.86	0
CC Veredas Unidas un Bien Común	4,056	0.86	0
CC Unión Patía Viejo	4,015	0.85	–
CC del Río Guajuí	3,963	0.84	0
Consejo Comunit Piedras Bachichi Correg Santa Cecilia	3,613	0.76	0
Fundación para el Desarrollo Social de Comunidades Negras	3,356	0.71	0
Alianza Nacional Afrocolombiana	2,976	0.63	0
CC de Comunidades Negras Socolando	2,942	0.62	0
CC Rio Curbaradó	2,681	0.57	0
Conmoguz	2,456	0.52	0
CC de Flamenco - Municipio de María La Baja	2,330	0.49	0
Asoc Afrocol Desplazados Mcpio Guacarí Valle del Cauca "ADAG"	2,322	0.49	0
CC Alto Paraíso	2,296	0.49	0
CC Puerto Girón	2,147	0.45	0
CC Arcilla, Cardón y Tuna	2,113	0.45	0
Consejo Mayor Condoto Iró	1,923	0.41	0
CC de Vuelta Manza	1,860	0.39	0
Consejo Comunit Recuerdo de Nuestros Ancestros Rio Mejicano	1,804	0.38	0
CC de los Corregimientos de San Antonio y El Castillo Municipio de El Cerrito	1,750	0.37	0
CC Rescate Las Varas	1,687	0.36	0
CC del Guabal	1,624	0.34	0
Corporación Kofi Annan	1,594	0.34	0
Corporación De Educadores del Litoral Pacifico Corelipa	1,186	0.25	0
Afromutata	1,087	0.23	0
Asociación Afrodescendientes de Arboletes	996	0.21	0
Coacneja	937	0.20	0
Fundación Social Magende Mi	633	0.13	0
Odeprivicor	542	0.11	0
Comunidad de Negros de Aguas Blancas	404	0.09	0
Blank votes	87,809	18.59	–
Total	472,426	100.00	2
Valid votes	472,426	83.86	
Invalid/blank votes	90,917	16.14	
Total votes	563,343	100.00	
Indigenous seat
Indigenous and Social Alternative Movement	84,637	42.26	1
Indigenous Authorities of Colombia	27,089	13.52	0
Colombian Indigenous Party	18,828	9.40	0
National Association of Cabildos and Indigenous Authorities in Colombia	7,957	3.97	0
Aywjawashi Indigenous Council	7,870	3.93	0
Resguardo Indígena Alta y Media Guajira	5,556	2.77	0
Resguardo Indígena Zenú Del Alto San Jorge	2,900	1.45	0
Blank votes	45,459	22.70	–
Total	200,296	100.00	1
Valid votes	200,296	84.29	
Invalid/blank votes	37,338	15.71	
Total votes	237,634	100.00	

== Aftermath ==
Following the electoral triumph of Gustavo Petro in the 2022 Colombian presidential election, Petro's coalition Historic Pact allied with the Liberal Party. The Liberal leader, César Gaviria, assured that the alliance would "allow the president-elect to overcome a political hurdle", which would provide the Historic Pact with less difficulty in advancing their agenda. The Conservative Party expressed no interest in being an opposition bloc with the party caucus ultimately voting to support the Historic Pact. The decision caused tension within the party as many opposed the move and led to party leader Omar Yepes' resignation. The Party of the U also declared they would not serve as an opposition bloc and contemplated whether to join the government or remain neutral. Meanwhile, the party of outgoing president Iván Duque, the Democratic Center, said they would be in the opposition. The Party of the U announced on 19 July that it would join the governing coalition.

The elected senators and members of the Chamber of Representatives were sworn in on 20 July 2022.

== See also ==
- 2022 Colombian presidential election
