= Luis Alberto Villamizar Cárdenas =

Colombian politician and diplomat

Colombia Ambassador to Cuba
- In office July 18, 1997 – 1999
- President: Ernesto Samper Pizano
- Preceded by: Miguel Antonio Yepes Parra

Colombia Ambassador to the Netherlands
- In office 1992–1994
- President: César Gaviria Trujillo
- Succeeded by: Carlos Gustavo Arrieta Padilla

Colombia Ambassador to Indonesia
- In office 1987–1989
- President: Virgilio Barco Vargas

Member of the Chamber of Representatives of Colombia
- In office 1982–1994

Personal details
- Born: October 26, 1944 Cúcuta, Norte de Santander, Colombia
- Died: July 26, 2007 (aged 62) Bogotá, DC, Colombia
- Resting place: Jardines del Recuerdo Cemetery; 4.784961°N 74.042273°W
- Party: New Liberalism
- Spouse: Maruja Pachón
- Relations: Luis Carlos Galán Sarmiento (brother-in-law)
- Children: Andrés Villamizar Pachón
- Occupation: Politician, Diplomat

Luis Alberto Villamizar Cárdenas (October 26, 1944 – July 26, 2007) was a Colombian politician and diplomat. He is best known for his role in fighting the Medellín drug cartel.

== Early life ==
Villamizar's grandfather was Colombia's Minister for War and his father was a physician to the Presidential Guard. Villamizar studied medicine at the Xavierian University in Bogotá, but failed to complete his degree. He worked in advertising and marketing and was a sales associate for B.F. Goodrich, a job through which he came to gain a very complete knowledge of Bogota, something that would prove very useful in his political career later on.

== Political career ==
Villamizar entered politics and became an ally of leading politician Luis Carlos Galán in seeking to limit the power of Pablo Escobar of the Medellín cocaine cartel. As leader of the Nuevo Liberalismo in the Chamber of Representatives of Colombia, Villamizar won passage of the National Narcotics Statute in 1986 which was the first general legislation against drug trafficking. He also worked against Escobar's attempts to have sympathetic politicians pass legislation against extradition.

Escobar arranged for an attempt on Villamizar's life in 1986. Following the assassination attempt, Villamizar was appointed as Ambassador to Indonesia. During his term as Ambassador, United States security forces captured a hitman in Singapore sent to kill him.

When Villamizar returned to Colombia, Escobar ordered Villamizar's wife, journalist Maruja Pachón, and his sister Beatriz Villamizar de Guerrero to be kidnapped. Eight more people were soon kidnapped as well. The President of Colombia commissioned Villamizar to negotiate the release of the captives. Escobar was so impressed with Villamizar's negotiating skills that he selected him to negotiate his (Escobar's) own later surrender to Colombian authorities. Gabriel García Márquez based his 1997 book News of a Kidnapping on Villamizar's fight against kidnapping.

In 1996, President Ernesto Samper appointed Villamizar as Colombia's first kidnapping czar. He set up a special police force to tackle kidnappings. In 1997, he was appointed as the Ambassador to Cuba.

== Death ==
Villamizar died in 2007 of complications of lung surgery in Bogotá, aged 62.

== Popular culture ==
Villamizar is portrayed by the actor Gustavo Angarita Jr. in TV Series Escobar, el patrón del mal.

Villamizar is portrayed by the actor Juan Pablo Raba in the Amazon Prime series News of a Kidnapping.
