= Carlos Fernando Galán =

Colombian politician (born 1977)

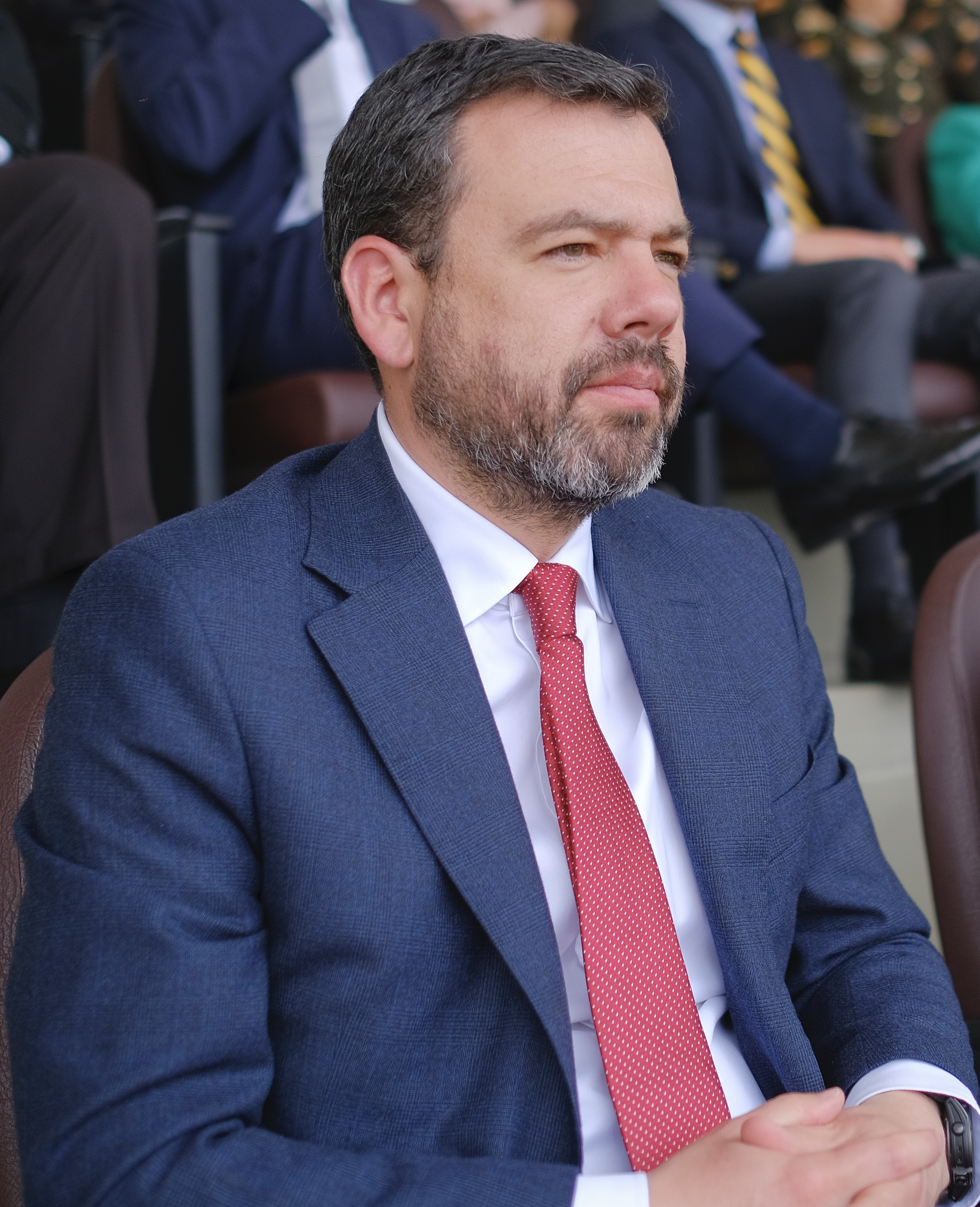
- Galán in 2025

800th Mayor of Bogotá
- Incumbent
- Assumed office January 1, 2024
- Preceded by: Claudia López

President of Council of Bogotá
- In office January 1, 2020 – December 31, 2020
- Preceded by: Nelly Patricia Mosquera
- Succeeded by: María Fernanda Rojas

Councilor of Bogotá
- In office January 1, 2020 – December 11, 2020
- In office January 1, 2008 – December 31, 2011

Senator of Colombia
- In office July 20, 2014 – June 5, 2018

Personal details
- Born: Carlos Fernando Galán Pachón; June 4, 1977 (age 49) Bogotá, D.C., Colombia
- Party: New Liberalism (since 2021)
- Other political affiliations: Independent (2018–2021); Radical Change (2007–2018); Colombian Liberal Party (2002–2007)
- Spouse: Carolina Deik (m. 2011)
- Relations: Juan Manuel Galán (brother)
- Parent(s): Luis Carlos Galán (father); Gloria Pachón (mother)
- Education: Georgetown University (BS); Universidad Externado de Colombia (PhD)
- Profession: Politician, journalist

Military service
- Allegiance: Colombia
- Branch/service: Colombian Air Force
- Years of service: 1990–1992
- Rank: Second Lieutenant

Carlos Fernando Galán Pachón (born June 4, 1977) is a Colombian politician and journalist. The youngest son of the presidential candidate Luis Carlos Galán Sarmiento, assassinated in 1989, and brother of the senator Juan Manuel Galán, Galán has been a Bogotá Councilor and a Senator of the Republic of Colombia, a position he resigned after resigning from the Radical Change Party due to ideological differences, the main of them, the support that his party decided to give Iván Duque for the 2018 presidential elections.

He was the candidate for mayor of Bogotá in 2019 for the independent movement Bogotá para la Gente, obtaining more than one million votes, and coming in second place.

He is the current Mayor of Bogotá following the 2023 regional elections, becoming the 800th person to hold this position.

== Biography ==
He graduated from Georgetown University as a Foreign Service Professional with an emphasis in International Economics. He is a Specialist in Government, Management, and Public Affairs from the Externado de Colombia University, and has yet to complete postgraduate studies in International Affairs at Columbia University. He was a correspondent for Semana Magazine in Washington, editor of the Cambio Magazine and Political Editor of El Tiempo, where he was part of the team that in 2007 won the National Journalism Award from the Círculo de Periodistas de Bogotá for investigations into parapolitics.

Political career

He worked at the Organization of American States (OAS) as an advisor to President César Gaviria when he was Secretary General between 2001 and 2003 and electoral observer during the 2001 Nicaraguan general election.

With the largest vote in the history of the District Council (48,162 votes), he was elected Councilor of Bogotá for the Radical Change Party, from where he was one of the main opponents of the dismissed mayor Samuel Moreno Rojas. His complaints about irregularities in public contracting became the starting point to uncover the so-called Carousel of contracting.3 He was qualified twice as the best Councilor in Bogotá by the Concejo Cómo Vamos project and elected by journalists from the city as the Most Outstanding Councilor of 2011. That year he decided to be a candidate for Mayor of Bogotá, obtaining 285,263 votes.

In 2012 he was appointed by President Juan Manuel Santos as Secretary of Illusion of Transparency of the Presidency of the Republic, in this position he defined and coordinated the design of the anti-corruption and transparency policy in Colombia. He represented Colombia before the mechanisms for monitoring the anti-corruption conventions of the United Nations and the Organization of American States, as well as in the Working Group on Bribery at the OECD.

He was twice elected by the Radical Change Party as its National Director. In the first stage in 2011, he revoked more than 300 endorsements for candidates questioned throughout the country for having possible links to illegal activities. In the second direction in 2013, he led the party during the 2014 congressional and presidential elections.

In 2014 he was elected as a senator of Colombia for a 4-year term. He led debates related to the construction of transportation systems, land use, territorial planning, and the implications of climate change on land occupation. As a senator, he was a member of the Senate Committee on Foreign Affairs, Defense, and International Trade, Chairman of the Committee on Oversight of Intelligence and Counterintelligence Activities, and Chairman of the Committee on Decentralization and Land Use Planning.

In 2015, he resigned from the leadership of the Radical Change Party due to deep differences with various members of the community regarding the definition of various candidacies for the 2015 local elections.

In 2018 he resigned from the Radical Change Party and the Senate. He ended his participation in the party after 11 years. His resignation was motivated by a lack of identification with the political project of Iván Duque. After the first round, in which Germán Vargas Lleras did not win, Cambio Radical chose to join Uribismo's candidacy.

In 2019 he ran as an independent candidate for mayor of Bogotá, his registration for the local elections in Bogotá is done through a Citizen Movement called Bogotá para la Gente after collecting signatures for several months.

In 2023 Carlos Fernando Galán was elected as mayor of Bogota, a position he assumed on January 1, 2024.

== Personal life ==
He is the son of the liberal politician Luis Carlos Galán and the journalist Gloria Pachón, brother of fellow politicians Claudio Galán and Juan Manuel Galán, and grandson of important liberal leader of Santander Mario Galán. He is a second lieutenant in the Colombian Air Force reserve. He is married, with two children.

Political offices
Preceded by Claudia López	Mayor of Bogotá; 2024–present	Incumbent
