= Platino Honorary Award =

Platino de Honor
- Country: Ibero-America
- Presented by: Entidad de Gestión de Derechos de los Productores Audiovisuales (EGEDA); Federación Iberoamericana de Productores Cinematográficos y Audiovisuales (FIPCA)
- First award: 2014
- Currently held by: Guillermo Francella
- Website: premiosplatino.com

The Platino Honorary Award (Spanish: Premio Platino de Honor del Cine Iberoamericano) is an honorary award given annually at the Platino Awards, presented by the Entidad de Gestión de Derechos de los Productores Audiovisuales (EGEDA) and the Federación Iberoamericana de Productores Cinematográficos y Audiovisuales (FIPCA). The award is presented to recognize the professional career of a person linked to the field of film, arts and Ibero-American culture.

It was first presented in 2014 at the first edition of the awards, with Brazilian actress Sônia Braga being the first recipient of the award. As of 2024, there have been ten honorees, all actors.

== Recipients ==
Year	Image	Recipient	Occupation	Nationality	Ref.
2014; I Edition		Sônia Braga	Brazil	Actress	
2015; II Edition		Antonio Banderas	Spain	Actor, director, singer, producer	
2016; III Edition		Ricardo Darín	Argentina	Actor, director, producer	
2017; IV Edition		Edward James Olmos	USA	Actor, director, producer, activist	
2018; V Edition		Adriana Barraza	Mexico	Actress, director	
2019; VI Edition		Raphael	Spain	Singer, actor	
2020; VII Edition		José Sacristán	Spain	Actor	
2021; VIII Edition		Diego Luna	Mexico	Actor	
2022; IX Edition		Carmen Maura	Spain	Actress	
2023; X Edition		Benicio del Toro	Puerto Rico	Actor	
2024; XI Edition		Cecilia Roth	Argentina	Actress	
2025; XII Edition		Eva Longoria	United States	Actress	
2026; XIII Edition		Guillermo Francella	Argentina	Actor	
