= Julián De La Chica =

Julian De La Chica
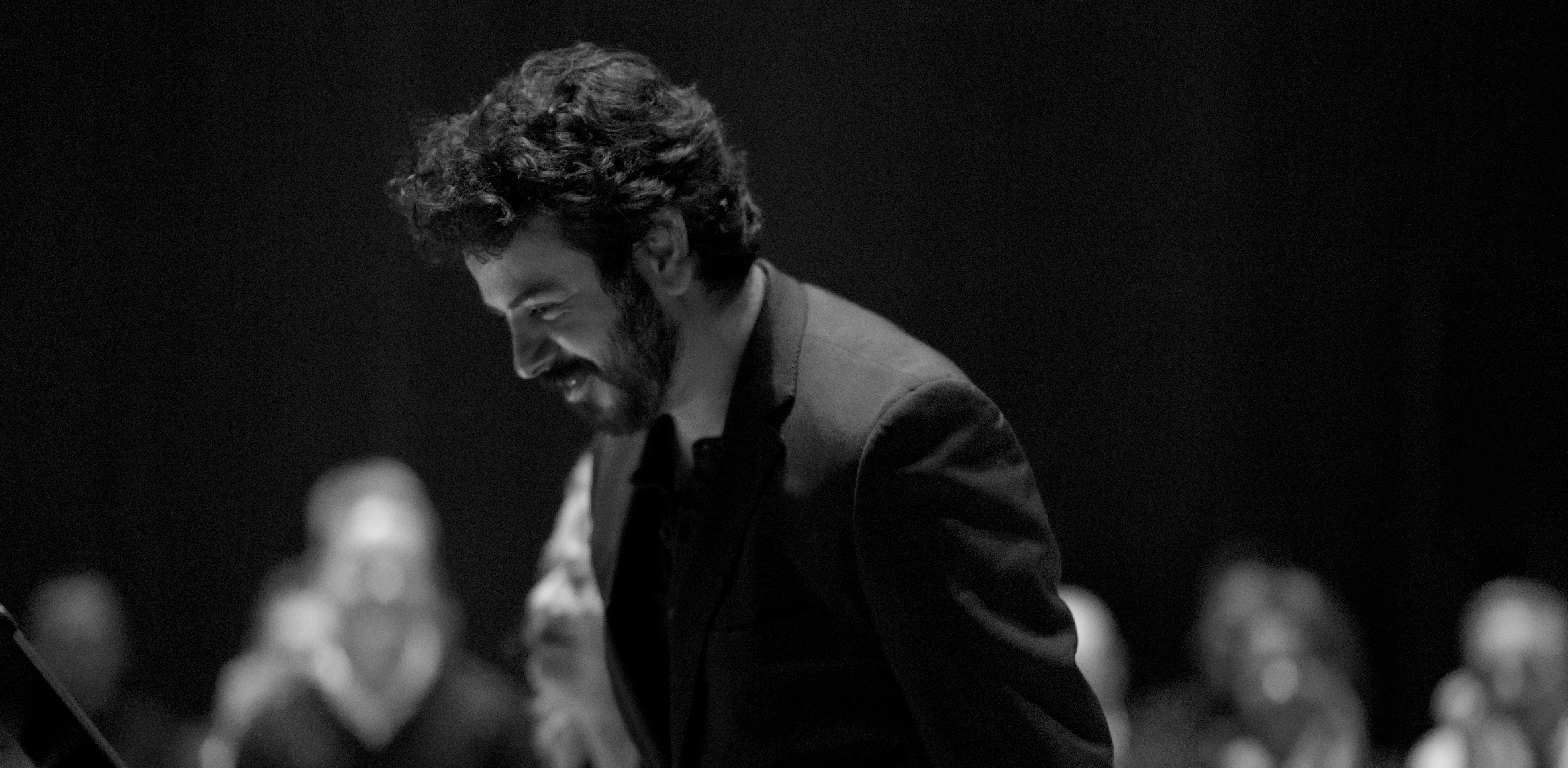

Background information
- Born: Julián De La Chica
- Genres: Classical; Minimalist
- Occupations: Composer; Pianist; Record producer
- Instrument: Piano
- Years active: 2003–present
- Label: Irreverence Group Music

Julián De La Chica is a Colombian composer, pianist, and record producer based in Brooklyn, New York. He is a founding member of the independent record label Irreverence Group Music. He is known for his directed and written film Agatha, which made its debut as official selection for the 37 edition of the Bogota festival Bogotá Film Festival.

== Early life ==
De La Chica began his musical career in the classical tradition, studying piano at the age of five in his hometown, Manizales. He completed his high school in Manizales and then moved to Europe. He began studies of humanities in Salamanca (Spain), and he also studied philosophy and metaphysics in Madrid. He undertook self-guided studies, in Bad Münstereifel, German Reading classical literature, composition, and the study of dead languages. He has been a Baldwin Piano Company artist since 2009.

== Career ==
De La Chica was invited by the former President de Colombia and Secretary of the Organization of American States, Cesar Gaviria Trujillo to offer a concert at the Headquarters of the OAS in Washington. In 2005, he was invited, among other representatives artists from Colombia, to the “first time” celebration of the Independence day of Colombia at the White house. In March 2016, De La Chica debuted at Zankel Hall in Carnegie Hall. Dominican Tenor José Heredia premiered his cycle “Four Short stories at the Standard Hotel Op. 6” and American Scorchio Quartet, premiered his String Quartet Op. 7 No. 1. De la Chica also premiered part of his Piano cycle Op. 8. In May 2021, Russian Mezzo Soprano, Yana Mann, released her first studio album, premiering De La Chica's Cycle Op. 12, Poemas de Bar. The album, also produced by De La Chica himself, received very good reviews from the public, praising the composition, as well as Mann's voice.

De La Chica has worked with various independent producers and directors as a film composer. In 2017, his short film Margaret won the "Best Original Score" award at the London Independent Film Awards. In 2018, six works composed by De La Chica, were part of the soundtrack of the film Honor Up, directed by Damon Dash and produced by Kanye West. In March 2020, De La Chica announced the first experimental film project Agatha directed and written by him. The film was officially selected by more than 10 international film festivals and already won “Best Picture” at the "Florence Film Awards", "Best LGBTQ film" at The IndieFEST Film Awards and "Best Soundtrack" award at the "Berlin Underground Film Festival".

== Discography ==
=== Solo albums ===
- Irreverence (2012)
- Nocturnal and circular Images Op.5 (2015)
- Psychosis (2018)
- Symphony No. 1 Op. 11 (2020)
- 11 Voyeuristic Images Op. 10 (2020)

=== Collaborative albums ===
- Minimal Aggression (2015)
- Four Short Stories at the Standard Hotel Op. 6 (2016)
- Experimentelle und unbestimmte Lieder Op. 9 (2017)
- Preludes Op. 8 (2018)
- Profanum (2019)
- 11 Poemas de Bar, Op. 12

=== Filmography ===
- 2014- The Last Conversation -composer
- 2017-Margaret-Composer
- 2018-Honor Up-music
- 2020-Agatha-Actor, writer and director
