= Gloria Pachón =

Colombian journalist

Colombian Ambassador to France
- In office 1993–1995

Personal details
- Born: Gloria Pachón Castro; June 22, 1935 (age 91) Cúcuta, North Santander, Colombia
- Spouse: Luis Carlos Galán (m. 1971; died 1989)
- Occupation: Journalist

Gloria Pachón de Galán (born June 22, 1935) is a Colombian politician and journalist. Between 1993 and 1995 she was the ambassador of Colombia in France during the government of César Gaviria and member of the executive board of UNESCO.

== Biography ==
She is the daughter of journalist Álvaro Pachón de la Torre born on July 22, 1935, in a journalist family in Colombia. She is the widow of Luis Carlos Galán, with whom she had three children, Juan Manuel, Carlos Fernando and Claudio Mario. She is also the sister of former education minister Maruja Pachón.

In the late 1960s, while working for the newspaper El Tiempo, she met Luis Carlos Galán, whom she married in 1970.

Shortly before President Misael Pastrana Borrero appointed Luis Carlos Galán as ambassador to Italy, they had Juan Manuel, their first child. Being a journalist, she founded the programming company Telestudio, which broadcast the Telenoticiero del Mediodía, under her direction.

Gloria Pachón supported her husband throughout her political career and since he died, she and her son Juan Manuel have vindicated the legacy of Luis Carlos Galán.

In 2008, when the Superior Court of Cundinamarca released Alberto Santofimio Botero, Gloria Pachón and her family announced that they would file an appeal for annulment, because they support the theory that Santofimio was the one who convinced Pablo Escobar to assassinate Luis Carlos Galán.
