= Héctor Villa Osorio =

Colombian businessman (1926–2012)

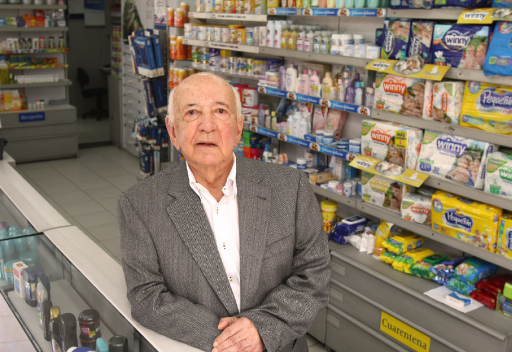
- Born: 1 May 1926; Manizales, Colombia
- Died: 18 August 2012 (aged 86); Bogotá, Colombia
- Occupation: Businessman
- Known for: Founder of Dromayor
- Relatives: Cesar Gaviria Trujillo

Héctor Villa Osorio Manizales, (1 May 1926, Bogotá – 18 August 2012) was a Colombian businessman and the founder of the pharmaceutical conglomerate, Dromayor. He was also the founder of Club del Comercio in Pereira and a strategic partner in construction projects such as Torre Central, Uniplex, and Unicentro Pereira. His net worth was US$300 million.

== Biography ==
Hector Villa was born on 1 May 1926, and was orphaned at just six years old. He was subsequently forced to drop out of school to earn a living. His first formal job was as an errand boy for a local pharmacy. There he began to learn about the industry he would later spearhead throughout the country. At the age of 15, he left for the city of Pereira, where he worked in other pharmacies.

On 9 April 1948, on the day of the Bogotazo, he founded a drugstore, Farmacia Americana, and was the sole employee. He spent 10 years there, living and working in the pharmacy which was open to the public 24/7. In 1950, he had saved enough money to open three more drugstores, and in 1953 he opened his first distribution center, Drogas Caldas, to supply his drugstores in the region.

He then opened the second distribution Center in Pereira called Deposito Central de Drogas. His company name was commonly shorted in telegraph messages to Dromayor, which ultimately became the name of the company. Throughout the next decade, he expanded his business to all major Colombian cities the following 15 years saw him opening and managing 25 distribution centers and more than 250 drugstores nationally with an expanded distribution network to include 10,000 independent Colombian pharmacies. The company had a 90% market share for the Colombian market until the early '90s when fierce international competition reduced their market share.

In the early 2000s, Dromayor made several attempts to internationalize through an attempted merger with an international conglomerate, but its efforts proved unsuccessful, partially due to several international economic crises. Revenue in 2012 was at US 200 Million. The company was eventually divided and sold to several smaller local companies.

In 1983, Héctor founded two pharmaceutical production plants called Anglopharma and Ophalac. They specialized in generics and produced over 380 references of pharmaceutical compounds, which were exported to the Peruvian, Panamanian, and Ecuadorian markets.

Beyond his pharmaceutical achievements, he was involved in the construction business through his real estate company. He was additionally involved in the liquor distribution and insurance industries. He also founded the Club del Comercio de Pereira.

== Personal life ==
He married Ruby Trujillo de Villa. She was the first cousin of the President of Colombia, Cesar Gaviria Trujillo. Together, Héctor and Ruby had four children.
