= Utama =

- Film poster
- Directed by: Alejandro Loayza Grisi
- Written by: Alejandro Loayza Grisi
- Produced by: Santiago Loayza Grisi; Marcos Loayza; Federico Moreira
- Starring: Luisa Quispe; José Calcina; Santos Choque
- Cinematography: Barbara Alvarez
- Edited by: Fernando Epstein
- Music by: Cergio Prudencio
- Production company: Alma Films
- Release dates: January 22, 2022 (Sundance); May 11, 2022 (France)
- Running time: 87 minutes
- Countries: Bolivia; Uruguay; France
- Languages: Quechua; Spanish
- Box office: $226,854

Utama is a 2022 internationally co-produced drama film directed by Alejandro Loayza Grisi in his directorial debut film. It premiered at the Sundance Film Festival on January 22, 2022 and was released in French theaters on May 11, 2022. It was selected as the Bolivian entry for the 95th Academy Awards for the Best International Feature Film award.

== Plot ==
An elderly Quechua-speaking couple lives in the Altiplano, the arid high plateau of the Andes, and the sick Virginio, knowing that he is about to die, spends his last days hiding this condition from his wife Sisa. A long life together has marked the life of the Quechua couple.

Together they are busy with tasks like grazing their llamas. His house is surrounded by high mountains. Virginio often looks at the sky and hopes that it will rain. Since there has been an extended period of drought and the village well is empty, Sisa has to walk to the river every day. Women from surrounding villages also flock to the last remaining spring.

One day they receive a visit from their grandson Clever, who brings news from the city. His grandparents conspicuously argue in Quechua over Clever's motives for visiting; he speaks to them in Spanish. Clever wants his grandparents to pack up and move to join the family to the city, where the sick Virginio can be examined and treated.

Clever and Virginio go to the mountains with nearby villagers and they perform a ritual to bring rain back to the land. Afterwards, the frustrated villagers debate the solutions to their drought, many opting to leave for the city.

During his shepherding Virginio falls unconscious. Clever finds him and brings him back to a worried Sisa, who asks him to disclose his mysterious cough. Virginio worries that Sisa will be alone, once he passes and he would rather have her come with him to the afterlife than to move to the city. Clever confronts him about his selfishness; they argue and Clever leaves the village. He soon returns with a doctor, who tries to convince Virginio to come to the city to get treated. A defeated Virginio refuses. He remains silent about dying but encounters many motifs around death including a dehydrated llama, a condor, and the news of Clever becoming a father, which he overhears. Virginio discretely makes plans to give Clever a tin box filled with photos and bits of gold. He gives Clever the box as well as his hat the day before he peacefully dies in his sleep.

The neighboring villagers attend Virginio's funeral. Clever gets ready to return to the city; he says goodbye to Sisa and she asks him to visit her often. Under the thundering sky, the widowed Sisa shepherds the llamas.

== Release ==
The first screenings of the film took place on January 22, 2022 at the Sundance Film Festival. It was released in French cinemas on May 11, 2022. At the end of June 2022 it was shown at the Munich Film Festival. The film was released in Swiss cinemas on June 23, 2022. In early July 2022, the film was shown at the Karlovy Vary International Film Festival in the Horizons section and in late July 2022 at the New Horizons International Film Festival. Performances at the Leipzig Film Art Fair were scheduled for September 2022. In October 2022 it was presented at the Vancouver International Film Festival and the Busan International Film Festival. The film was scheduled for release in German cinemas in January 2023.

== Reception ==
=== Critical reception ===
On the review aggregator website Rotten Tomatoes, 96% of 46 critics' reviews are positive, with an average rating of 7.8/10. The website's consensus reads: "With breathtaking cinematography and naturalistic performances, Utama touchingly captures love and tradition in times of climate change." Metacritic, which uses a weighted average, assigned the film a score of 74 out of 100, based on 15 critics, indicating "generally favorable" reviews.

=== Accolades ===
Award	Date of ceremony	Category	Recipient(s)	Result	Ref.
Sundance Film Festival	January 30, 2022	World Cinema Grand Jury Prize: Dramatic	Alejandro Loayza Grisi	Won	
Málaga Film Festival	March 27, 2022	Golden Biznaga for Best Iberoamerican Film	Utama	Won	
Málaga Film Festival	March 27, 2022	Best Director	Alejandro Loayza Grisi	Won	
Málaga Film Festival	March 27, 2022	Special Critics Award	Alejandro Loayza Grisi	Won	
Málaga Film Festival	March 27, 2022	Best Music	Cergio Prudencio	Won	
Sydney Film Festival	June 19, 2022	Sydney Film Prize	Utama	Nominated	
Sydney Film Festival	June 19, 2022	Sustainable Future Award	Alejandro Loayza Grisi, Santiago Loayza Grisi, Federico Moreira, Alpha Violet	Nominated	
Guadalajara International Film Festival	June 20, 2022	Best Iberoamerican Film	Alejandro Loayza Grisi	Nominated	
Guadalajara International Film Festival	June 20, 2022	Best Screenplay	Alejandro Loayza Grisi	Won	
Guadalajara International Film Festival	June 20, 2022	Best First Feature	Alejandro Loayza Grisi	Won	
Guadalajara International Film Festival	June 20, 2022	Jorge Cámara Award	Alejandro Loayza Grisi	Won	
Beijing International Film Festival	August 20, 2022	Tiantian Award	Alejandro Loayza Grisi	Nominated	
Beijing International Film Festival	August 20, 2022	Best Supporting Actor	Santos Choque	Won	
Hong Kong International Film Festival	August 31, 2022	Golden Firebird Award - Young Cinema	Utama	Nominated	
Film Fest Ghent	October 20, 2022	North Sea Port Audience Award	Utama	Nominated	
Forqué Awards	December 17, 2022	Best Latin-American Film	Utama	Nominated	
International Film Festival of Kerala	December 16, 2022	Best Film Award	Utama	Won	
Goya Awards	February 11, 2023	Best Ibero-American Film	Utama	Nominated	
Platino Awards	April 22, 2023	Best First Feature Film	Utama	Nominated	
Platino Awards	April 22, 2023	Best Original Score	Cergio Prudencio	Won	
Platino Awards	April 22, 2023	Best Cinematography	Barbara Álvarez	Won	
Platino Awards	April 22, 2023	Best Sound	Federico Moreira	Nominated	
Platino Awards	April 22, 2023	Film and Education Values	Utama	Nominated	
Rolling Stone en Español Awards	October 26, 2023	Fiction Feature Film of the Year	Utama	Nominated	
Rolling Stone en Español Awards	October 26, 2023	Direction of the Year	Alejandro Loaysa Grisi	Nominated	

== See also ==
- List of submissions to the 95th Academy Awards for Best International Feature Film
- List of Bolivian submissions for the Academy Award for Best International Feature Film
