= Cristián Samper =

Colombian-American tropical biologist (born 1965)

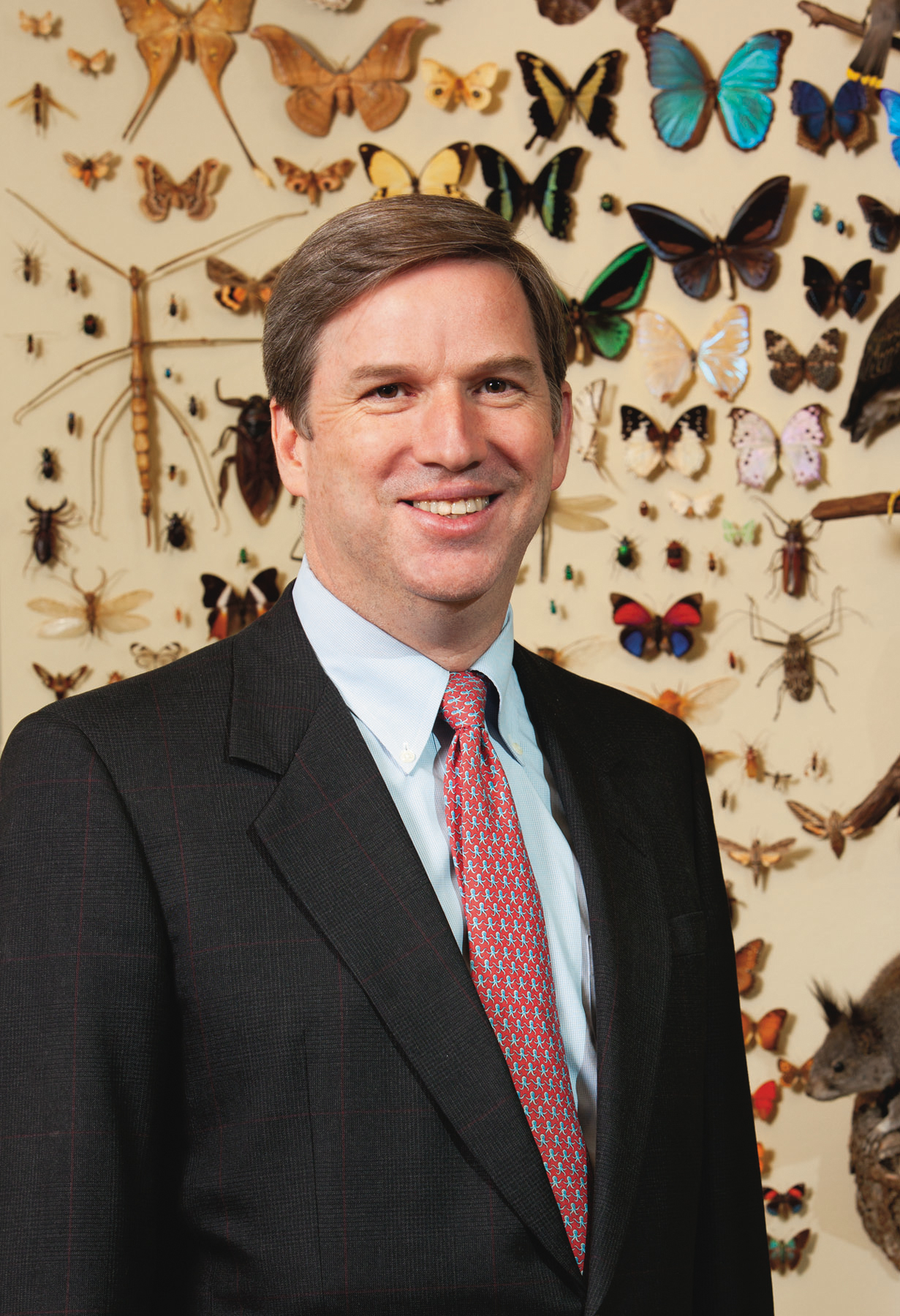
- Born: September 25, 1965 (age 61); San José, Costa Rica
- Citizenship: Colombia, United States
- Education: University of the Andes (B.Sc.); Harvard University (M.Sc., Ph.D.)
- Awards: Derek Bok Public Service Prize (1992); Order of San Carlos (2014)
- Scientific career
- Fields: Biology
- Workplaces: Bezos Earth Fund (2022-present); Wildlife Conservation Society (2012-2022); National Museum of Natural History (2003-2012); Smithsonian Tropical Research Institute (2001-2003); Alexander von Humboldt Biological Resources Research Institute (1995-2001)

Cristián Samper (born September 25, 1965) is a Colombian-American tropical biologist who specializes in conservation biology and environment policy. He is the managing director and leader of Nature Solutions at the Bezos Earth Fund. From 2012 to 2022, he was president and CEO of WCS (Wildlife Conservation Society). Before that, he served as the director of the Smithsonian Institution's National Museum of Natural History from 2003 to 2012. From 2007 to 2008, he served as acting secretary of the Smithsonian, becoming the first Latin-American to hold the position. In April 2015, Samper was inducted into the American Academy of Arts and Sciences.

== Early life and education ==
Samper was born on September 25, 1965, in San José, Costa Rica to Armando Samper Gnecco, a Colombian agronomist and economist, and Jean Kutschbach, an American from New York. The youngest of four children, he was raised in Colombia from the age of one and spent part of his childhood in Chile.

In 1987, Samper graduated from the University of the Andes in Bogotá, Colombia, with a B.Sc. in Biology. He then moved to the United States to attend Harvard University, where he earned a M.Sc. in 1989 and a Ph.D. in Biology in 1992 with his dissertation Natural disturbance and plant establishment in an Andean cloud forest.

== Career ==
From 1995 to 2001, Samper was the first director of the Alexander von Humboldt Biological Resources Research Institute in Colombia. He also led the Colombian delegation to the United Nations Convention on Biological Diversity and served as Chairman of the Subsidiary Body of Scientific, Technical, and Technological Advice (SBSTTA) from 1999 to 2001.

=== Smithsonian ===
In 2001, he became deputy director and staff scientist at the Smithsonian Tropical Research Institute in Panama. In 2003, he became the Director of the Smithsonian Institution's National Museum of Natural History in Washington, D.C.

In 2006, he commented on an exhibit at the National Museum of Natural History on the Arctic National Wildlife Refuge, "Seasons of Life and Land". Following the resignation of Secretary Lawrence M. Small, the Board of Regents appointed Samper as the Smithsonian's Acting Secretary in 2007 and 2008. Upon the appointment of G. Wayne Clough, he returned to the museum in July 2008. In July 2012, he stepped down as director to become president and CEO of the Wildlife Conservation Society (WCS).

=== Wildlife Conservation Society ===
Samper was president and CEO of the Wildlife Conservation Society (WCS) from 2012 to 2022. During his tenure, he oversaw a system of urban parks—including the Bronx Zoo, New York Aquarium, Central Park Zoo, Queens Zoo, and Prospect Park Zoo—and a global conservation program active in 60 countries and across all the world's oceans. He advocated for ending elephant poaching and illegal wildlife trade, including advocating for a state ivory ban in New York.

In July 2020, Samper issued a public apology for the treatment of Ota Benga, a young Central African from the Mbuti people of present-day Democratic Republic of Congo who was exhibited at the St. Louis World's Fair and later displayed at the Bronx Zoo.

=== Bezos Earth Fund ===
Samper joined the Bezos Earth Fund as principal advisor in 2021 and became its managing director and leader of nature solutions in 2022.

== Affiliations and honors ==
The Smithsonian Board of Regents awarded Samper the Gold Medal for Exceptional Service in 2008, and he was also awarded the Joseph Henry Medal when he left the Smithsonian in 2012. In September 2014, Colombian President Juan Manuel Santos presented Samper with the Order of San Carlos.

In April 2015, Samper was inducted into the American Academy of Arts and Sciences. He is also a member of the Colombian Academy of Sciences, the Academy of Sciences for the Developing World, and the Council on Foreign Relations.

== Personal life ==
In 2002, Samper married Adriana Casas Isaza, an environmental lawyer from Colombia. They have two children. Former Colombian president Ernesto Samper is his cousin.
