= Ojalá Que Llueva Café (song) =

- Cover of the CD, maxi-single release in Spain

Single by Juan Luis Guerra

from the album Ojalá Que Llueva Café
- Language: Spanish
- B-side: "Reina Mía"
- Released: 1989
- Recorded: 1988–89
- Genre: Merengue; cumbia
- Length: 4:07

Juan Luis Guerra singles chronology
"Guavaberry" (1987)	"Ojalá Que Llueva Café" (1989)	"Reina Mía" (1989)

"Ojalá Que Llueva Café" (English "Hope That It Rains Coffee") is the lead single by the Dominican artist Juan Luis Guerra and his band 4:40 from their fourth studio album of the same title. It was released on 1989 by Karen Records and 1990 in Europe by Ariola Records. The lyrics are a poetic metaphor about the poor conditions of the hard-working people residing in the countryside and the hope that the things are going be better someday in the future. It is one of Guerra's signature songs and one of the first tracks to gain international attention in his career, peaking on the Billboard Hot Latin Tracks and Latin America airplay charts. The music video was ranked number one of the top 15 best music videos of all time by Dominican artists.

In 1996, the track was covered by the band Café Tacuba and included on their album Avalancha de Éxitos. The track was included on Guerra's greatest hits album Grandes Éxitos Juan Luis Guerra y 440 and live versions of the track were included on the albums A Son De Guerra Tour (2013) and Entre Mar y Palmeras (2021). In 2020, the track was re-recorded in an acoustic version and included for his Privé EP.

== Track listings and formats ==
- Dominican Republic 7" single
  1. "Ojalá Que Llueva Café" – 4:07
  2. "Reina Mía" – 4:03
- Spain 7" single (1990)
  1. "Ojalá Que Llueva Café" – 4:07
  2. "Razones" – 3:59
- Spain CD / maxi-single (1990)
  1. "Ojalá Que Llueva Café" – 4:10
  2. "Estrellitas y Duendes" – 4:23
  3. "Reina Mía" – 4:00
- Germany 7" single (1990)
  1. "Ojalá Que Llueva Café" – 4:10
  2. "Reina Mía" – 4:00
- France 7" single (1992)
  1. "Ojalá Que Llueva Café" – 4:10
  2. "Estrellitas y Duendes" – 4:23

== Charts ==
Chart (1989–1993)	Peak position
Argentina (AP)	8
Dominican Republic (UPI)	4
Panama (UPI)	3
Peru (UPI)	9
Puerto Rico (UPI)	3
US Hot Latin Songs (Billboard)	21
