= Maruja Pachón Castro =

Pablo Escobar kidnap victim

Maruja Pachón
- Born: December 9, 1948 (age 77); New York City, New York
- Occupation: Minister
- Spouse: Luis Alberto Villamizar Cárdenas
- Relatives: Gloria Pachón

Maruja Pachón (born December 9, 1948) is a Colombia kidnap victim and former Minister of Education.

== Biography ==
Pachón was born in New York. She married Alberto Villamizar and as result she and her sister in law, Beatriz Villamizar de Guerrero, were kidnapped by Pablo Escobar on 7 November 1990. She may have been chosen because her sister, Gloria Pachón was the widow of the Presidential candidate Luis Carlos Galán who had been assassinated in August 1989 by hit men hired by the drug cartels. Escobar eventually kidnapped further victims in order that he might persuade the Government of President César Gaviria to rethink their drugs policy. She was released in May 1991. She and her husband feature strongly in News of a Kidnapping which was written by Gabriel García Márquez and documents the kidnappings.

She took the position of Minister for Education by President César Gaviria in 1993. She is credited with bringing in reform to the sector. In 1994, she directed the Luis Carlos Galán Institute for the Development of Democracy.

In 2009 it was announced that a film was to be made about the seven months she was kidnapped and actress Salma Hayek was to take her role.

== Private life ==
She has six children from two marriages. Her husband politician Alberto Villamizar died in 2007.
