= Armando Samper Gnecco =

Colombian agronomist and engineer

Colombian Minister of Agriculture
- In office 31 October 1969 – 7 August 1970
- President: Carlos Lleras Restrepo
- Preceded by: Enrique Peñalosa Camargo
- Succeeded by: Javier Emilio Valderrama
- In office 7 August 1966 – 26 July 1967
- President: Carlos Lleras Restrepo
- Preceded by: José Mejía Salazar
- Succeeded by: Enrique Blair Fabris

Personal details
- Born: 9 April 1920 Bogotá, Colombia
- Died: 14 September 2010 (aged 90) Bogotá, Colombia
- Spouse: Jean Kutschbach (1945–2010)
- Children: Marta Samper Kutschbach; Belén Samper Kutschbach; Mario Samper Kutschbach; Cristián Samper Kutschbach
- Education: Cornell University
- Profession: Agronomist

Armando Samper Gnecco (9 April 1920 – 14 September 2010) was a Colombian agronomist and engineer. He served as Minister of Agriculture of Colombia in 1966-67 and 1969–70, and was a founding member of the International Center for Tropical Agriculture, General Director of the Inter-American Institute for Agricultural Sciences (now known as Inter-American Institute for Cooperation on Agriculture) from 1960 to 1966, and Deputy General Director of FAO for Latin America from 1972 to 1974. Dean of Jorge Tadeo Lozano University (1971), President of the National Corporation for Forest Research and Development of Colombia, CONIF (1974–1978), and President of the Executive Board and General Director of the Colombian Sugarcane Research Center, Cenicaña (1978–1990).

He finished his secondary studies at the Gimnasio Moderno in Bogotá then moved to the United States to attend University of Maryland, College Park. From there he transferred to Cornell University where he graduated in 1943 with a B.Sc. in Agricultural Economy.

== Personal life ==
Armando was born on 9 April 1920 in Bogotá to Daniel Samper Ortega and María Amalia Gnecco Fallón. He married on 26 July 1945 to Jean Kutschbach, whom he met during his studies in Cornell University, and with whom he had four children, Marta, Belén, Mario, and Cristián.
