= Claudio Galán Pachón =

Colombian politician

Personal details
- Born: October 26, 1974 (age 51) Roma, Italy
- Citizenship: Colombia Italy
- Relations: Juan Manuel Galán Pachón, Carlos Fernando Galán
- Parent(s): Luis Carlos Galán & Gloria Pachón
- Occupation: Politician, Diplomat

Claudio Mario Galán Pachón (born October 26, 1974) is a Colombian Italian politician, diplomat, youngest son of liberal leader Luis Carlos Galán, former director of Justice Security and Government of the DNP, designated mayor in charge of the municipality of Soacha, one of the largest municipalities in Cundinamarca, replacing José Ernesto Martínez and later Colombian consul in Paris. Galán Pachón is a professional in International Relations with a Master's in Political Science, with a Specialization in Public Administration and a Specialization in Latin American Studies from University of the Sorbonne-Nouvelle Paris. He was professor at the undergraduate and master's level in political science at the Javeriana University. He is the current National Director of Trade Union Training at FENALCO.

Claudio is the brother of senators Juan Manuel Galán and Carlos Fernando Galán.
