= Juan Manuel Galán =

Colombian politician

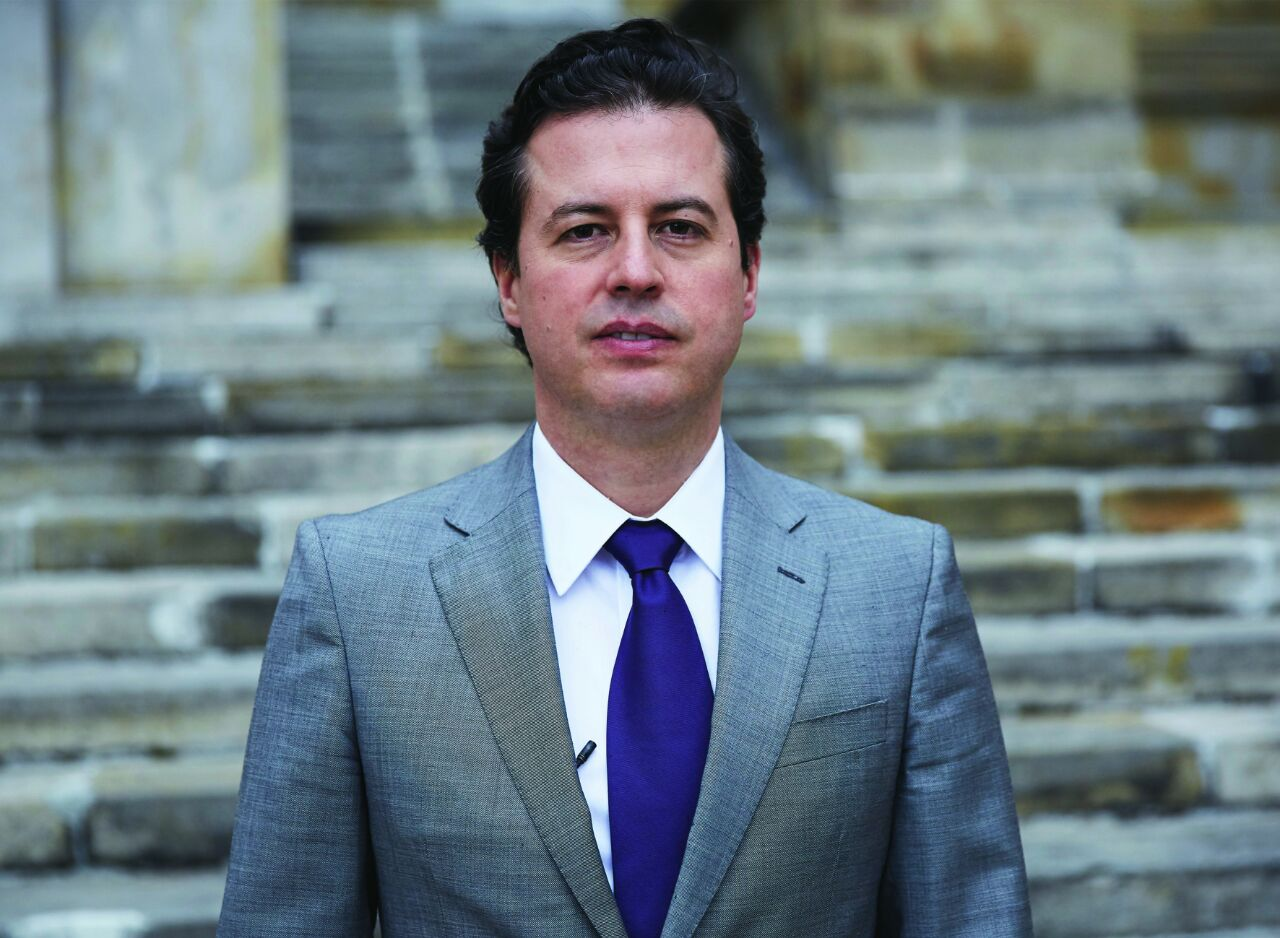
- Galán in 2017

President of the New Liberalism Party
- Incumbent
- Assumed office 6 July 2021
- Preceded by: Position established

Senator of Colombia
- In office 20 July 2006 – 20 July 2018

Personal details
- Born: Luis Carlos Galán Pachón; 29 July 1972 (age 54) Bogotá, D.C., Colombia
- Party: New Liberalism (since 2021)
- Other political affiliations: Liberal (1987–2018)
- Spouse: Carmenza Lian Barrera (m. 2002)
- Relations: Carlos Fernando Galán (brother)
- Children: 2
- Parent(s): Luis Carlos Galán (father); Gloria Pachón (mother)
- Education: École des Hautes Études Internationales (LEI, 1996; MEI, 1997); Edmund A. Walsh School of Foreign Service (MSFS, 2003)
- Profession: Political Scientist
- Website: www.galan.co

Juan Manuel Galán Pachón (born 29 July 1972) is a Colombian politician, currently serving as Senator of Colombia since 2006. He is the son and political heir of the assassinated political activist, politician, and presidential candidate, Luis Carlos Galán Sarmiento. A former member of the Liberal party, he refounded his father's party, New Liberalism, in 2021.

== Career ==
Galán attended the Instituto Pedagógico Nacional in Bogotá, where he graduated in 1989, the year his father was assassinated. After his family relocated to France, he enrolled at the Paris Institute of Political Studies where obtained a Certificate of Political Studies in 1992. He later attended the École des Hautes Études Internationales, also in Paris, where he graduated in 1996 with a Licentiate in International Affairs, and in 1997, graduated again with a Master of International Affairs with his thesis: New Liberalism: Or the New Way of Doing Politics in Colombia, that was later published by Planeta publishing company in Colombia. In 2003 he received a Master of Science in Foreign Service from the Edmund A. Walsh School of Foreign Service at Georgetown University in Washington, D.C.

In 1997, he returned to Colombia after eight years abroad, and quickly took the mantle of politics left by his father. He backed Rudolf Hommes Rodríguez against his uncle Antonio Galán Sarmiento in the mayoral race for Bogotá, which caused a great deal of controversy, and he went on to disavow former associates of his father for abusing the memory of his father and using his image for political gains, which infuriated members of the New Liberalism party, which his father had founded. He further moved to the right of his father when in 1998, he backed the Conservative party presidential candidate, Andrés Pastrana Arango. He became the campaign's youth director for Pastrana, and after Pastrana won the election, he named Galán Deputy Director for Youth at the Ministry of National Education.

In 2004, he was named Envoy Extraordinary and Minister Plenipotentiary at the Embassy of Colombia in London by President Álvaro Uribe Vélez. He resigned in August 2005, and returned to Colombia to run for Senate.

=== Senate ===
Galán ran for Senate during the 2006 elections as the second-in-line of the open-option electoral list put forth by the Liberal party. The Liberal party list received a total of 1,436,657 votes, of which Galán received 64,449, the second-highest number of votes after Juan Manuel López Cabrales, the third-in-line of the Liberals' electoral list. During this term he was a member of the Senate's Second Commission that deals with Foreign Affairs and National Defence.

He ran again in 2010, this time as head of the open-option electoral list put forth by the Liberal party. The Liberal party obtained 1,724,151 votes, of which 81,555 were for Galán who obtained the second-highest number of votes after Arlet Patricia Casado Fernández, the third-in-line of the Liberals' electoral list.

He is currently a member of the Senate's First Commission that deals with Statutory Laws and Internal Affairs.

== Political positions ==
=== Drugs ===
Galán is in favour of drug liberalization policies, both to decriminalize and to legalize its use, and has openly called for a public debate on the issue in light of the failure of the war on drugs. Galán was the author of Law 1566 of 2012 which made psychoactive drug use, abuse, and addiction a public health issue, and mandated that it be treated as a disease, thus placing its treatment under the existent publicly funded health care system.

=== Euthanasia ===
Galán is in support of voluntary euthanasia and physician-assisted suicide, and as member of the Senate's First Commission voted in favour and worked to pass legislation that would regulate such practices. Both practices are allowed in Colombia after a 1997 Constitutional Court ruling, but no such laws to document and regulate the practice have been passed by Congress, preventing many from taking such measures, "no one can be legally forced to suffer or feel pain, to prolong a painful life, everyone has every right to be the master of their destiny and to have available the opportunity to decide, together with their family, about euthanasia procedures".

=== LGBT rights ===
In 2013, Galán voted in favour of Recognition of same-sex unions in Colombia both in the Senate's First Commission and in the floor of the senate, expressing his position in favour of marriage for same-sex couples over other forms of legal unions which he considered non-viable.

== Personal life ==
Born in Bogota to Luis Carlos Galán Sarmiento and Gloria Pachón Castro; the eldest of their three children; his two younger brothers are, Claudio Mario and Carlos Fernando. His father, Luis Carlos, was a former Education Minister, Ambassador, and Senator, who was shot to death by hitmen hired by the notorious drug lord Pablo Escobar on 18 August 1989, when the former was running for President of Colombia. Juan Manuel's maternal aunt, Maruja, then-wife of Luis Alberto Villamizar Cárdenas, was kidnapped a year later, also on orders of Escobar, as part of a larger scheme by Escobar and his allies to put pressure on the Government to stop an extradition deal with the United States, something Juan Manuel's father supported.
