= Luis Carlos Galán =

Colombian politician (1943–1989)

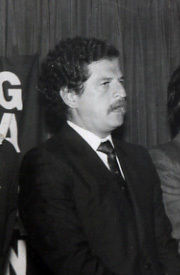
- Galán in 1976

Senator of Colombia
- In office 20 July 1978 – 20 July 1989

Colombian Ambassador to Italy
- In office 1972–1975
- President: Misael Pastrana Borrero
- Preceded by: Antonio Álvarez Restrepo
- Succeeded by: Jaime Castro Castro

Minister of National Education
- In office 7 August 1970 – 4 May 1972
- President: Misael Pastrana Borrero
- Preceded by: Octavio Arizmendi Posada
- Succeeded by: Juan Jacobo Muñoz

Personal details
- Born: Luis Carlos Galán Sarmiento; 29 September 1943 Charalá, Santander, Colombia
- Died: 18 August 1989 (aged 45) Soacha, Cundinamarca, Colombia
- Cause of death: Assassination
- Resting place: Central Cemetery of Bogotá
- Party: Liberal
- Other political affiliations: New Liberalism (1979–1987)
- Spouse: Gloria Pachón Castro (1971–1989)
- Relations: Alfonso Valdivieso Sarmiento (cousin)
- Children: 4, including Juan Manuel and Carlos Fernando
- Education: Pontifical Xavierian University
- Profession: Journalist

Luis Carlos Galán Sarmiento (29 September 1943 – 18 August 1989) was a Colombian liberal politician and journalist who ran for the Presidency of Colombia on two occasions, the first time for the political movement New Liberalism that he founded in 1979. The movement was an offspring of the mainstream Colombian Liberal Party, and with mediation of former Liberal president Julio César Turbay Ayala, Galán returned to the Liberal party in 1989 and sought the nomination for the 1990 presidential election, but was assassinated before the vote took place.

Galán declared himself an enemy of the drug cartels and the influence of the mafia in Colombian politics, in this case the main drug cartel being the Medellin Cartel led by Pablo Escobar and who unsuccessfully tried to become a member of the New Liberalism Movement in his bid to become a member of the Colombian House of Representatives. Galán denounced Pablo Escobar in a public rally, and supported the extradition treaty with the U.S., contrary to the wishes of the Colombian cartels that feared extradition to the U.S.

After receiving several death threats, on 18 August 1989, Galán was shot and killed by hitmen hired by the drug cartels of Pablo Escobar during a campaign rally in the town of Soacha, Cundinamarca. At the time, he was comfortably leading the polls with 60 percent favourable ratings for the forthcoming 1990 presidential election. While the investigation into his assassination remains unsolved, Galan's assassination was a crucial factor in the downfall of the Medellin Cartel a few years later.

== Biography ==
=== Early life ===
Luis Carlos Galán Sarmiento was born on 29 September 1943 in the city of Charala, Santander. He had a happy childhood, with strong family bonds, affectionate and sometimes austere, as he had 12 siblings. His father moved with the whole family to Bogotá in 1949.

In Bogotá, Galán attended middle school in the Colegio Americano in 1950. While a student there and only 8 years old, he joined a rally against Conservative president Laureano Gómez and intended to support the Liberal guerrillas. Two years later he was transferred to another school, the Colegio Antonio Nariño. When he was only a 14-year-old, Galán participated in the students protests of 1957 against the dictatorial regime of Gustavo Rojas, being arrested and spending the night in a jail despite his young age. In 1960 Galán graduated from high school with honors and began studies of law and economics in the Pontifical Xavierian University in Bogotá. While a student in 1963, Galán founded Vértice, a university focused magazine to express his Liberal tendencies in a university that was predominantly Conservative, which also became his first experience with journalism. He was able to meet prominent Colombian leaders like former Liberal president Carlos Lleras (who, delighted with Galán's work, decided to write articles for Vértice Magazine) and Colombia's main circulation newspaper El Tiempo owner and also former Liberal president of Colombia Eduardo Santos during an interview in which Santos was impressed by Galán's journalist qualities. Galán began working for the Colombian newspaper El Tiempo in 1965 after graduating from university the same year.

=== Journalism ===
While working with El Tiempo, Galán turned himself into a well known journalist and columnist, an effort that earned him the director's assistant position and later the membership of the Executive Directorate in the newspaper with the support of Eduardo Santos and then director Roberto García Peña. He was also active with the Nueva Frontera weekly magazine founded by former president Carlos Lleras, which he directed in 1976 after arriving from Italy. As a journalist Galán wrote no less than 150 editorial articles, followed by another 150 during his time with the El Tiempo newspaper.

In 1977 Galán wrote an article in one of Nueva Frontera's editorials denouncing the existence of narcotics trafficking mafias and that they were influencing the social structure of Colombia. He also denounced the clientelist politics, moral values corruption and collective values loss, which was seen as a premonition for Colombia's future.

It was during an interview with the then recently elected president Misael Pastrana that he was surprised by the president in the middle of the interview who told Galán that he was going to be his Minister of Education.

In 1986, Galán wrote an autobiography under the pseudonym "Cleo Tilde", but it was not until 1994 that the identity was revealed. He described detailed facts, events and encounters with prominent figures as well as an approach to his personal point of view and thoughts.

=== Political career ===
In 1970 Galán was appointed Minister of National Education during the presidency of Misael Pastrana. His time as minister was marked by his progressive and social policies, but was not considered successful. In 1972 Galán was appointed Ambassador of Colombia to Italy and later in 1974 while still ambassador, was appointed Colombian representative to the Food and Agriculture Organization of the United Nations (FAO). Under the influence of former president Lleras and after directing the Nueva Frontera Magazine for seven years, in 1976 Galán ran for councilman in the small town of Oiba in the northeastern department of Santander. In 1977 and 1978 Galán became very active and supportive of Carlos Lleras reelection as president of Colombia while he ran for the Senate. The reelection never occurred, however, and he got elected as Senator of Colombia representing the Santander Department.

On 30 November 1979 Galán founded a party with the name Nuevo Liberalismo and within the Liberal Party.

During the 1980s Colombia went under critical siege by violent drug cartels, especially the Medellín Cartel that had gained a great amount of influence by bribing or killing officials. Galán saw this as disastrous for Colombia and its society.

In 1980 Galán was elected as councilman for the capital, Bogotá to be named the following year as possible candidate for the presidency of Colombia amid divisions in the Liberal Party that intended to challenge the majorities of the party led by Alfonso López Michelsen and then president Julio César Turbay, but voters leaned for the conservative candidate Belisario Betancur. For Galán it had been a positive outcome despite losing, his party Nuevo Liberalismo had gained a 10% of the total votes, winning 21 of the 23 Department Assemblies and getting reelected as Senator, but he had been criticised by the Liberal party for creating divisions among them and indeed losing the Presidency.

In 1982 Medellin Cartel boss Pablo Escobar tried to infiltrate Galán's Nuevo Liberalismo Party. Galán publicly rejected him in front of thousands of his fellow men from Antioquia and Colombia, which angered the cartel, especially Escobar.

Galán continued with his ascendant career, absenting himself from the 1986 presidential race to prevent Liberal Party divisions and running his party as an offspring he was reelected once again as a Senator. This allowed the Liberal Party to regain the Presidency with the election of Virgilio Barco but at a terrible cost for his party that lost 50% of the votes gained in the previous election.

It was only until the mediation of former president Julio César Turbay that Galán returned to the party in 1987 and intended to win the party nomination for official candidate. Galán was growing impatient with the violence and the corruption the drug cartels led by Pablo Escobar and Gonzalo Rodríguez were imposing in Colombia, which encouraged him to try to support the weakening government by shifting the balance of power away from his dangerous enemies.

The Nuevo Liberalism joined the government and was given the Ministry of Agriculture headed by Gabriel Rosas Vega, and the Liberal Party gained a solid union that consolidated further when Galán won the Liberal Party's popular nomination to be the presidential frontrunner. Galán was becoming popular for his open criticism and denunciation of drug cartel violence, as he had promised to extradite drug dealers to the United States. He announced he would run for office on 4 July 1989 in the Tequendama Hotel in Bogotá. After this announcement, his popularity rating skyrocketed to 60%.

Meanwhile, Escobar found some support in Tolima's political chief Alberto Santofimio, affiliated also with a faction of the Liberal Party led by Alfonso López Michelsen and with a movement called Movimiento de Renovación Liberal (Liberal Renovation Movement), getting himself elected to the Chamber of Representatives as second runner up for Santofimios' congress candidate Jairo Rojas.

== Death ==
According to accounts the first assassination threats were calls made to Galán's home telephone number after the Liberal Party convention to nominate an official candidate. Flyers were left in the mailbox threatening to kill or kidnap his children. An attempt to kill Galán with an RPG was thwarted while visiting Medellín on 4 August 1989. The assassination attempt was prevented by men working for Waldemar Franklin Quintero, the commander of the Colombian National Police in Antioquia. Accompanying Quintero and Galán was the mayor of Medellín, Pedro Pablo Peláez; both Peláez and Quintero would be killed within a few weeks of the assassination attempt. After these assassinations, Galán and his family restricted their travels, especially at night.

Later on, Galán's staff received information from the Colombian intelligence services advising him of a group of hitmen staying in Bogotá that had the intention of killing him. His staff advised him not to travel to the town of Soacha and that the trip to Valledupar was more suitable since he was also scheduled to travel to nearby Barranquilla to attend a 1990 FIFA World Cup qualification match in which the Colombian national team was going to play. However, Galán changed his mind and ordered his staff to prepare to go to Soacha. On 18 August 1989, Galán, who was being protected by eighteen armed bodyguards, was killed as he walked onto the stage to give a speech in front of 10,000 people in Soacha. At least ten others were wounded in the gunfire. This created a war that both sides did not want, one side being the Colombian Government and the other The Extraditables. Both sides saw deaths at a record toll.

The Colombian drug cartels were worried about the possible approval in congress of an extradition treaty with the United States, and political enemies had feared Galán's increasing power would isolate many of them from the voters. According to John Jairo Velásquez a.k.a. "Popeye" and Luis Carlos Aguilar a.k.a. "El Mugre", former hitmen of Pablo Escobar, the assassination was planned in a farm by Escobar, Gonzalo Rodríguez a.k.a. "El Mexicano", Liberal political leader Alberto Santofimio and others. Velásquez affirmed that Santofimio had certain influence over Escobar's decision making, and he had heard Santofimio say "kill him Pablo, kill him!". Santofimio told Escobar that if Galán became president, he would extradite Escobar to the United States. Other potential perpetrators were mentioned by a demobilized member of the AUC paramilitary group, "Ernesto Baez", who testified that the murder of Galán was organized by the Colombian mafia with the participation of corrupt members of the military and the DAS.

== Aftermath ==
César Gaviria, who had been Galán's debate chief ("Jefe de Debate") during the campaign, was proclaimed as his successor by Galán's family and his supporters inside the Liberal party. He was elected president in 1990.

In 2004, new information in a letter written by one of the hitmen who had infiltrated his escort suggested that Galán's assassination was executed with help of corrupt Colombian policemen and some of his own bodyguards, who had been bought off by the drug cartels, including Pablo Escobar and other drug lords. Most of the arrested presumed hitmen were killed in jail or shortly after their release, allegedly to silence them.

On 13 May 2005, a former Justice minister (1974) and congressman of the Colombian Liberal Party, Alberto Santofimio, known for his open connections to Pablo Escobar during the 1980s (Escobar joined Santofimio's political movement), was arrested in Armenia and accused of being the intellectual author of Galán's murder.

According to the newly extended confession of Escobar's former top hitman, John Jairo Velasquez (also known as "Popeye"), Santofimio would have openly suggested Galán's murder during a secret meeting, in order to eliminate a political rival and, should Galán ever be elected president, also prevent Escobar's likely extradition. Santofimio had been previously questioned and mentioned during the investigation and his involvement was widely rumored, but apparently no direct testimonies of his role had been acquired until recently. Velásquez, who served a 23-year sentence and died in 2020, told the Colombian press that he had initially denied Santofimio's participation due to his existing political power at the time. Other new and unspecified evidences would also have contributed to building the case against Santofimio.

On 11 October 2007, Alberto Santofimio was convicted to 24 years in prison. He was later released on appeal in 2008, but in August 2011 the Supreme Court reinstated the conviction and he surrendered himself.

On 25 November 2010 Colombian prosecutors issued an arrest warrant for the ex-director of the Colombian security agency (DAS), Retired Gen. Miguel Maza Márquez, for involvement in Galán's murder. The prosecutors claimed that Maza intentionally lightened Galán's bodyguard contingent to enable his assassination. The Supreme Court convicted Maza in 2016 and sentenced him to 30 years in prison.

== Family ==
Son of Mario Galán Gómez and Cecilia Sarmiento Suárez, Galán was one of their 12 children, the others being: María Lucía, Gabriel, Cecilia, Helena, Elsa, Gloria, Antonio, Juan Daniel, Mario Augusto, Francisco Alberto and María Victoria Galán Sarmiento. He was cousin of former Attorney General of Colombia Alfonso Valdivieso Sarmiento. In 1971 he married journalist Gloria Pachón Castro and had three children Juan Manuel, Claudio Mario and Carlos Fernando.

== Quotes ==
Galán was largely influenced by Pierre Teilhard de Chardin's ideas and Nikos Kazantzakis's books. His father Mario described him as a person fascinated with spirituality, a man with integrity, an individual struggle for knowing one's self between good and evil and that the effort to achieve it consisted in the main objective in life, not only individually, but collectively.

«La sensibilidad social del autor, el hombre integral que buscaba y la lucha interna que Kazantzakis padeció y soportó a través de su vida entre el ángel y la bestia, entre la naturaleza interior y superior del hombre, entre el mundo pasional y el espíritu, lo fascinaban dice su padre- la búsqueda de esa trascendencia espiritual y el esfuerzo para realizarlo constituía para Luis Carlos el objetivo de la vida, no solamente en lo individual sino también en lo colectivo».

Once again the Colombian men turn passionate; but their passion is not that of the parties, the one that perverted their spirits and pushed thousands of countrymen to death towards phantoms of selfish ideals. Now our passion is Colombia and we believe in this ideal as the only one capable of uniting the whole country.

- Luis Carlos Galán – Revista Vértice, May 1964.

For Colombia, always forward, not a single step backwards, and whatever is a necessity let it be.

-Galán's campaign slogan

== Popular culture ==
- Galán is portrayed by actor Nicolás Montero in the Colombian TV series Escobar, el Patrón del Mal. Montero also portrays Galán in TV Series Football Dreams, a world of passion.
- In TV series Tres Caínes, Galán is portrayed in a minor role by the Colombian actor Walter Luengas.
- Galán is portrayed by actor Juan Pablo Espinosa on the 2015 Netflix drama/action series Narcos. The show is a serialized take on drug kingpin Pablo Escobar (played by Brazilian actor Wagner Moura) and the Medellín Cartel.
- Galan appears as a prominent figure in Ingrid Rojas Contreras's debut novel Fruit of the Drunken Tree. The protagonist, observant Chula Santiago, is seven years old when her mother Alma takes her and her sister to the fateful Galan rally. Alma was a fervent supporter of Galan, and the assassination is the first interaction Chula had with death, and it touches her deeply.

== See also ==
- Luis Donaldo Colosio, candidate of the Mexican Institutional Revolutionary Party, assassinated in 1994.
- Jorge Eliecer Gaitán, a similar Colombian Liberal Party candidate assassinated in 1948.
- Assassination of Fernando Villavicencio
- List of unsolved murders (1980–1999)
