= New Liberalism (Colombia) =

Colombian political party

New Liberalism Nuevo Liberalismo
- Leader: Juan Manuel Galán Pachón
- Founders: Rodrigo Lara Bonilla; Luis Carlos Galán Sarmiento
- Founded: 1979 (original); 2021 (refounded)
- Dissolved: 1990 (original)
- Split from: Colombian Liberal Party
- Youth wing: Pioneros
- Ideology: Liberalism (Colombian); Social liberalism
- Political position: Centre
- National affiliation: Hope Center Coalition (2021–2022)
- Senators: 0 / 108
- Seats in the Chamber of Representatives: 2 / 188

Website
- Nuevo Liberalismo

New Liberalism (Spanish: Nuevo Liberalismo) is a political party in Colombia. Originally founded by Luis Carlos Galán in 1979 as a dissident force of the Colombian Liberal Party and dissolved in the 1990s, the party was refounded in 2021 by two of his sons, Juan Manuel Galán Pachón and Carlos Fernando Galán.

== History ==
=== Original party ===
Running against both the conservatives and the mainstream Liberal Party, Galán lost the elections in 1982. He and his movement officially returned to the Liberal Party in 1987, but several of the members still considered themselves as part of a somewhat distinct entity. Back in the Liberal fold, Luis Carlos Galán appeared as the leading candidate in polls and hoped to be able to win the next presidential elections, which would be held in 1990.

After Galán's assassination in 1989, any remnants of the original party had dissolved by the 1990s.

=== Modern electoral history ===
At the legislative elections on 10 March 2002, the party won as one of the many small parties parliamentary representation.

In 2021, the party was revived following a ruling by the Constitutional Court of Colombia.

In the 2022 Colombian parliamentary election, the newly revived party managed to elect two candidates for congress, Julia Miranda and Juan Sebastián Gómez.

In the 2023 Colombian regional and municipal elections, the party won 2 governorships and 40 mayorships. Carlos Fernando Galán won the election for Superior Mayor of Bogotá. He was officially inaugurated as Mayor on 1 January 2024. His priorities as mayor included security, embracing new technologies, gender equality, education, and job creation.
