= Dark Beast =

Dark Beast may refer to:

- Dark Beast (Marvel Comics), a Marvel Comics supervillain who is a version of Beast from the "Age of Apocalypse"
- Dark Beast (film), a 2016 drama film
