= Platino Award for Best Supporting Actress in a Miniseries or TV series =

- Country: Ibero-America
- Presented by: Entidad de Gestión de Derechos de los Productores Audiovisuales (EGEDA), Federación Iberoamericana de Productores Cinematográficos y Audiovisuales (FIPCA)
- Currently held by: Andrea Pietra for The Eternaut (2026)
- Website: premiosplatino.com

The Platino Award for Best Supporting Actress in a Miniseries or TV series (Spanish: Mejor Interpretación Femenina de Reparto en Miniserie o Teleserie) is one of the Platino Awards, Ibero-America's film awards presented annually by the Entidad de Gestión de Derechos de los Productores Audiovisuales (EGEDA) and the Federación Iberoamericana de Productores Cinematográficos y Audiovisuales (FIPCA).

== History ==
Until the 3rd edition of the awards, only film categories were awarded. In 2017, the category for Best Miniseries or TV series was introduced, being followed the next year by performance categories in television productions (male lead and female lead). In 2020, the categories for acting in television were split between lead and supporting.

The category for Best Supporting Actress in a Miniseries or TV series was first introduced alongside the Platino Award for Best Supporting Actor in a Miniseries or TV series category in 2020 at the 7th Platino Awards. Spanish actress Alba Flores was the first recipient of the award for her role as Ágata Jiménez (Nairobi) in the heist crime drama television series Money Heist.

As of 2025, no actress has won this award more than once while Najwa Nimri is the most nominated actress in the category as well as only actress who has been nominated multiple times with three nominations, including two consecutive for Money Heist in 2021 and 2022, winning the latter year.

In the list below the winner of the award for each year is shown first, followed by the other nominees.

== Winners and nominees ==
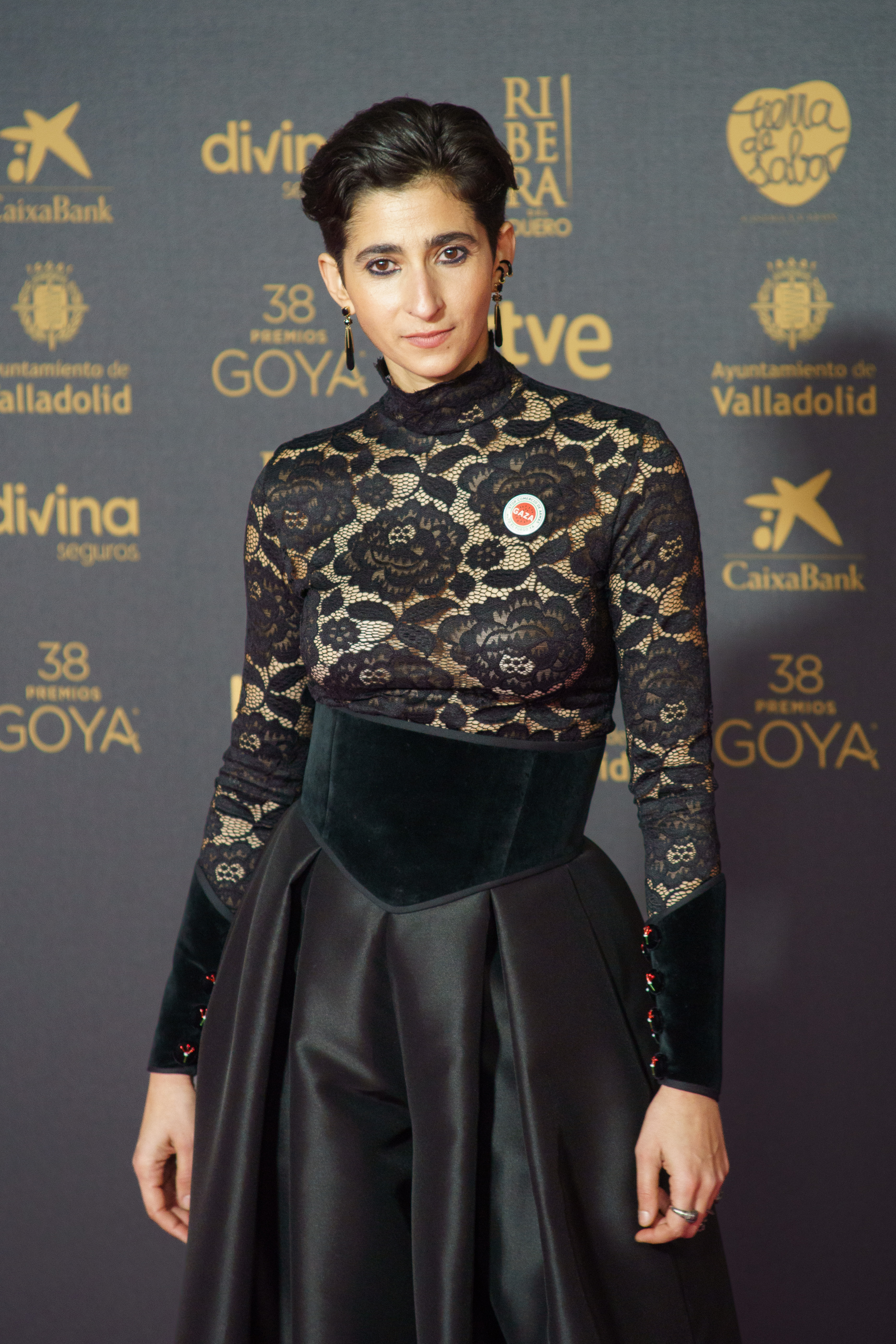
Alba Flores, the first recipient of the award.

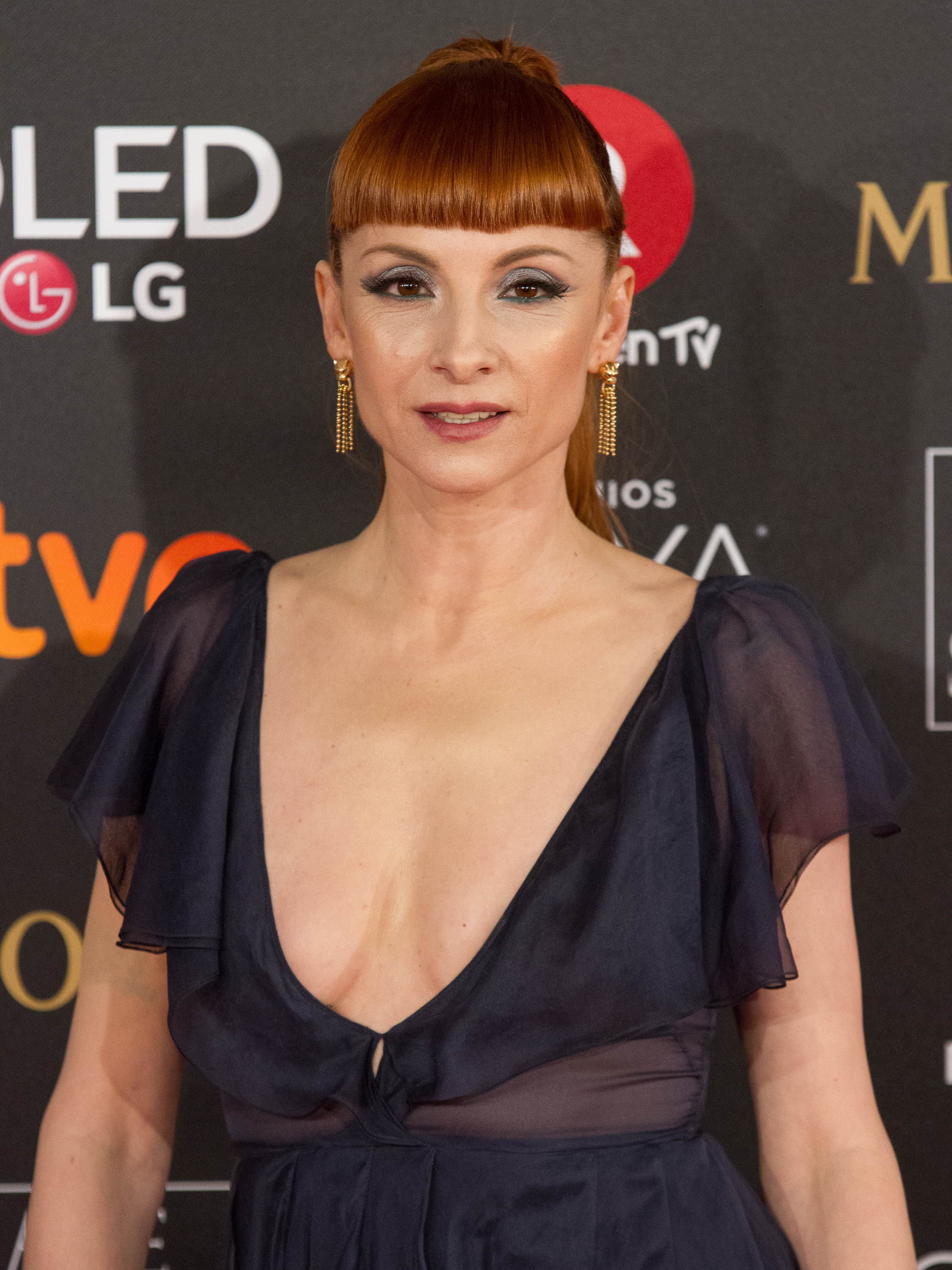
2022 winner Najwa Nimri.

=== 2020s ===
Year	Actor	Role(s)	English title	Original title
2020 (7th)
2020 (7th)	(Spain) Alba Flores	Ágata Jiménez (Nairobi)	Money Heist	La casa de papel
2020 (7th)	(Spain) Belén Cuesta	Magüi Moreno	Paquita Salas	
2020 (7th)	(Argentina) Florencia Raggi	Patricia Rosello	Monzón: A Knockout Blow	Monzón
2020 (7th)	(Mexico) Mariana Treviño	Jenny Quetzal	The House of Flowers	La casa de las flores
2021 (8th)	(Spain) Loreto Mauleón	Arantxa Garmendia Uzkudun	Patria	
2021 (8th)	(Spain) Ester Expósito	Cayetana Aldama	Somebody Has To Die	Alguien tiene que morir
2021 (8th)	(Spain) Najwa Nimri	Alicia Sierra	Money Heist	La casa de papel
2021 (8th)	(Spain) Susana Abaitua	Nerea Lertxundi	Patria	
2022 (9th)	(Spain) Najwa Nimri	Alicia Sierra	Money Heist	La casa de papel
2022 (9th)	(Spain) María Pujalte	Macarena	Venga Juan	
2022 (9th)	(Argentina) Nancy Dupláa	Roberta Candia	El reino	
2022 (9th)	(Mexico) Rosa María Bianchi	Cecilia Dávila Vda. De Carranza	Monarca	
2023 (10th)	(Colombia) Majida Issa	Diana Turbay	News of a Kidnapping	Noticia de un Secuestro
2023 (10th)	(Chile) Amparo Noguera	Nora Figueroa	42 Days of Darkness	42 días en la oscuridad
2023 (10th)	(Spain) Leonor Watling	Iria	I Don't Like Driving	No me gusta conducir
2023 (10th)	(Spain) Veronica Echegui	Ane Uribe	Intimacy	Intimidad
2024 (11th)	(Spain) Carmen Machi	Montserrat	La mesías	
2024 (11th)	(Argentina) Minerva Casero	Dafne Menajem	Yosi, the Regretful Spy	Iosi, el espía arrepentido
2024 (11th)	(Spain) Najwa Nimri	Haruka	30 Coins	30 monedas
2024 (11th)	(Argentina) Pilar Gamboa	Sofía Vega	División Palermo	
2025 (12th)	(Spain) Carmen Maura	Julia	Land of Women	'Tierra de mujeres
2025 (12th)	(Mexico) Frida Sofía Cruz Salinas	Sicarú / child Manuel	El Secreto del Río	
2025 (12th)	(Colombia) Loren Sofía	Amaranta	One Hundred Years of Solitude	Cien años de soledad
2025 (12th)	(Colombia) Viña Machado	Pilar Ternera	One Hundred Years of Solitude	Cien años de soledad
2026 (13th)	(Argentina) Andrea Pietra	Ana	The Eternaut	El eternauta
2026 (13th)	(Mexico) Leticia Huijara	Eulalia Baladro	The Dead Girls	Las muertas
2026 (13th)	(Argentina) Lorena Vega	Fernanda	Envious	Envidiosa
2026 (13th)	(Mexico) Yalitza Aparicio	Emma	Cometierra	
