= 12th Platino Awards =

Ibero-American film awards ceremony for 2024

- Date: 27 April 2025
- Site: IFEMA Palacio Municipal, Madrid, Spain
- Hosted by: Aislinn Derbez; Asier Etxeandía

Highlights
- Most awards: Film: I'm Still Here (3); Television: One Hundred Years of Solitude (3)
- Most nominations: Film: Undercover (11); Television: One Hundred Years of Solitude (8)

Television coverage
- Network: TNT Latam; Max; Telemundo; Universo; La 2; RTVE Play

The 12th Platino Awards, presented by the Entidad de Gestión de Derechos de los Productores Audiovisuales (EGEDA) and the Federación Iberoamericana de Productores Cinematográficos y Audiovisuales (FIPCA), took place on April 27, 2025, at IFEMA Palacio Municipal in Madrid, Spain, to recognize excellence in Ibero-American film and television of 2024.

The ceremony was broadcast on TNT Latam and Max in Latin America, La 2 and RTVE Play in Spain, and Telemundo and Universo in the United States. The ceremony was hosted by Mexican actress Aislinn Derbez and Spanish actor Asier Etxeandía.

== Background ==
Following the eleventh edition of the awards in 2024, which took place at Gran Tlachco Theater in Riviera Maya, Mexico, it was announced that the 2025 edition would take place IFEMA Palacio Municipal in Madrid, Spain, being the fourth time the ceremony is held at said venue. It also marks the fifth time it takes place in Madrid, and sixth in Spain. As a part of an agreement, the host city for the ceremony will alternate between Madrid and Riviera Maya (Quintana Roo) from 2024 to 2027.

As with previous editions, the ceremony was broadcast in Latin America on television in TNT Latam and streaming in Max. Additionally, broadcast in the United States was handled for the first time by Telemundo and Universo. In early February 2025, the pre-selection were announced for every category. Later in the same month, the twenty shortlisted films and series were announced, including 176 productions.

Nominations were revealed on March 14 via a livestream from Telemundo Center in Miami, by Mexican actress Adriana Barraza, Puerto Rican actor Amaury Nolasco, Spanish actress Candela Márquez and Ecuatorian actor Danilo Carrera. Spanish thriller Undercover led the film nominations with eleven, followed by the Argentine drama Kill the Jockey with nine. In the television categories, Netflix Colombian series One Hundred Years of Solitude, based on the novel of the same name by Gabriel García Márquez led with a record-breaking eight nominations, followed by the Netflix Brazilian miniseries Senna, about Brazilian racing drive Ayrton Senna, with four nominations.

The Platino audience awards were announced on April 26, 2025, one day ahead of the gala; winners included Undercover for Best Film, One Hundred Years of Solitude for Best Miniseries, Carolina Yuste for Best Film Actress, Luis Tosar for Best Film Actor, Candela Peña for Best Series Actress, and Claudio Cataño for Best Series Actor.

== Winners and nominees ==
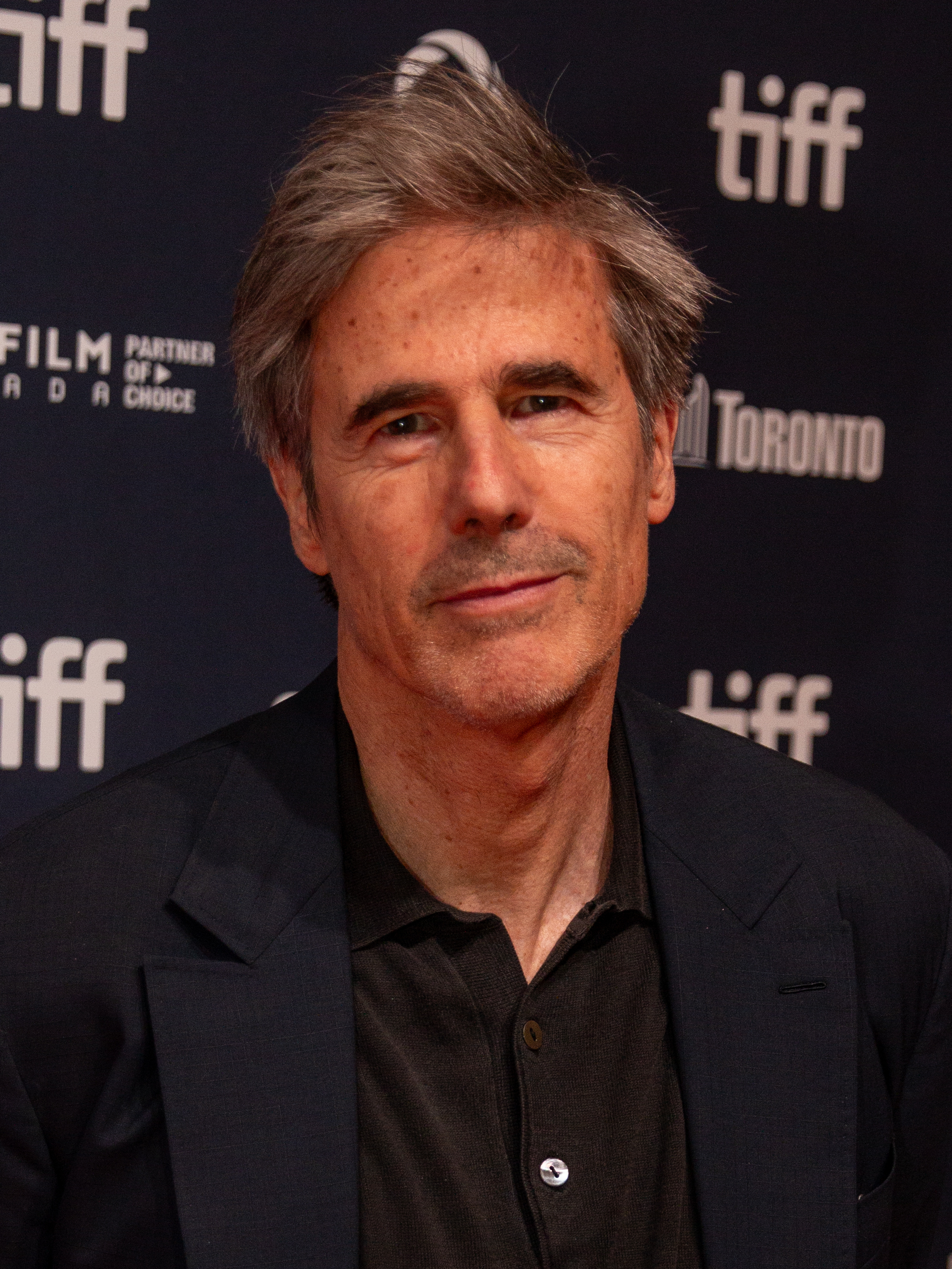
Walter Salles, Best Director winner.

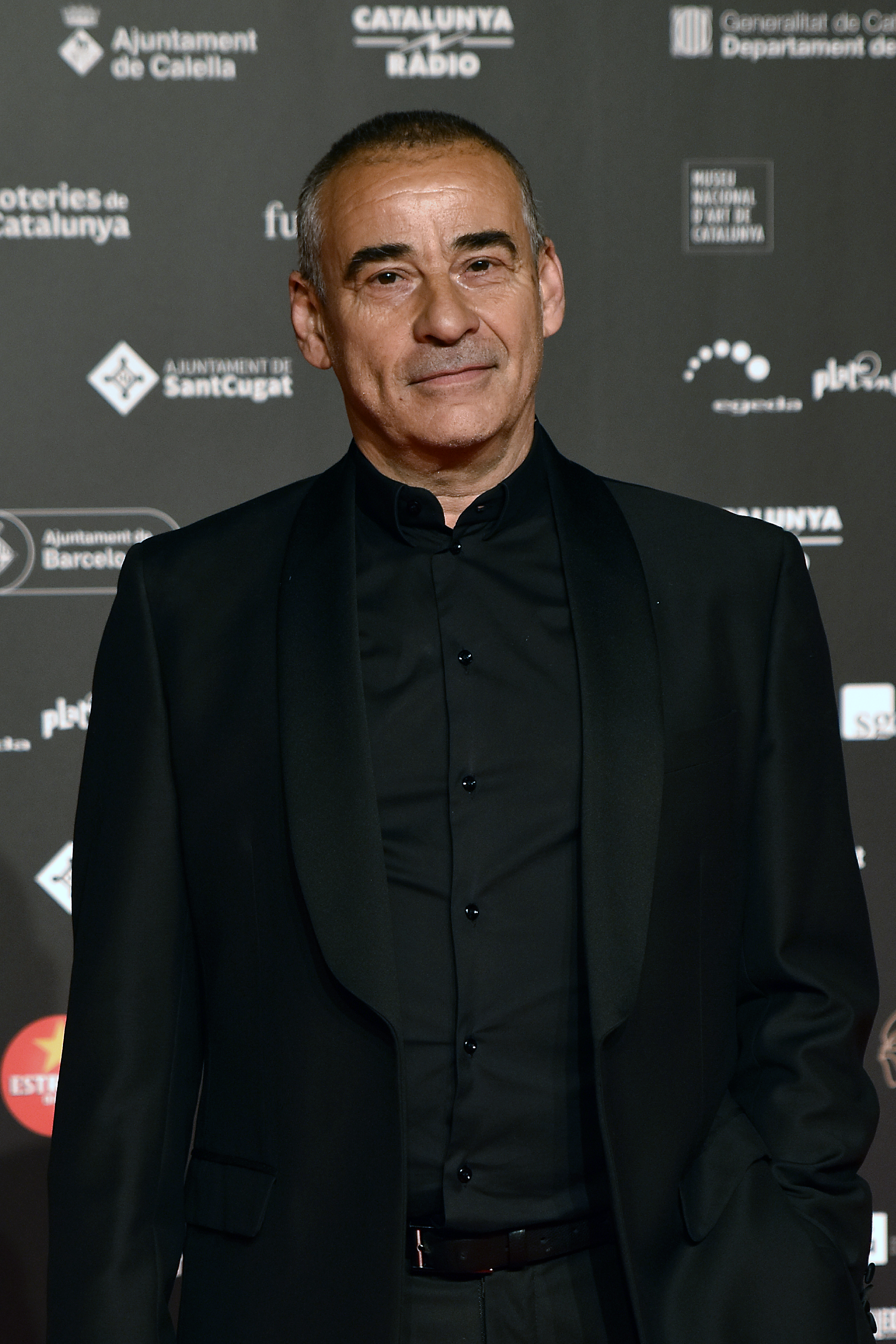
Eduard Fernández, Best Actor winner.

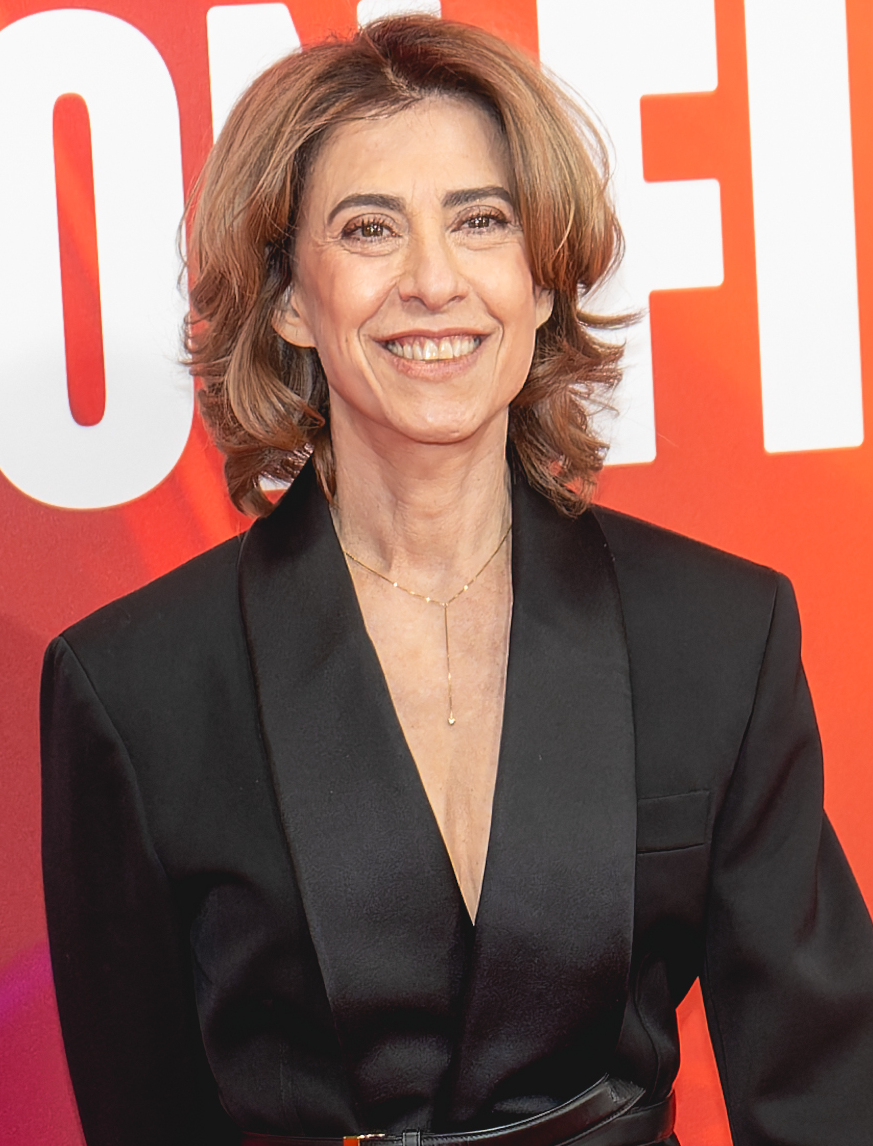
Fernanda Torres, Best Actress winner.

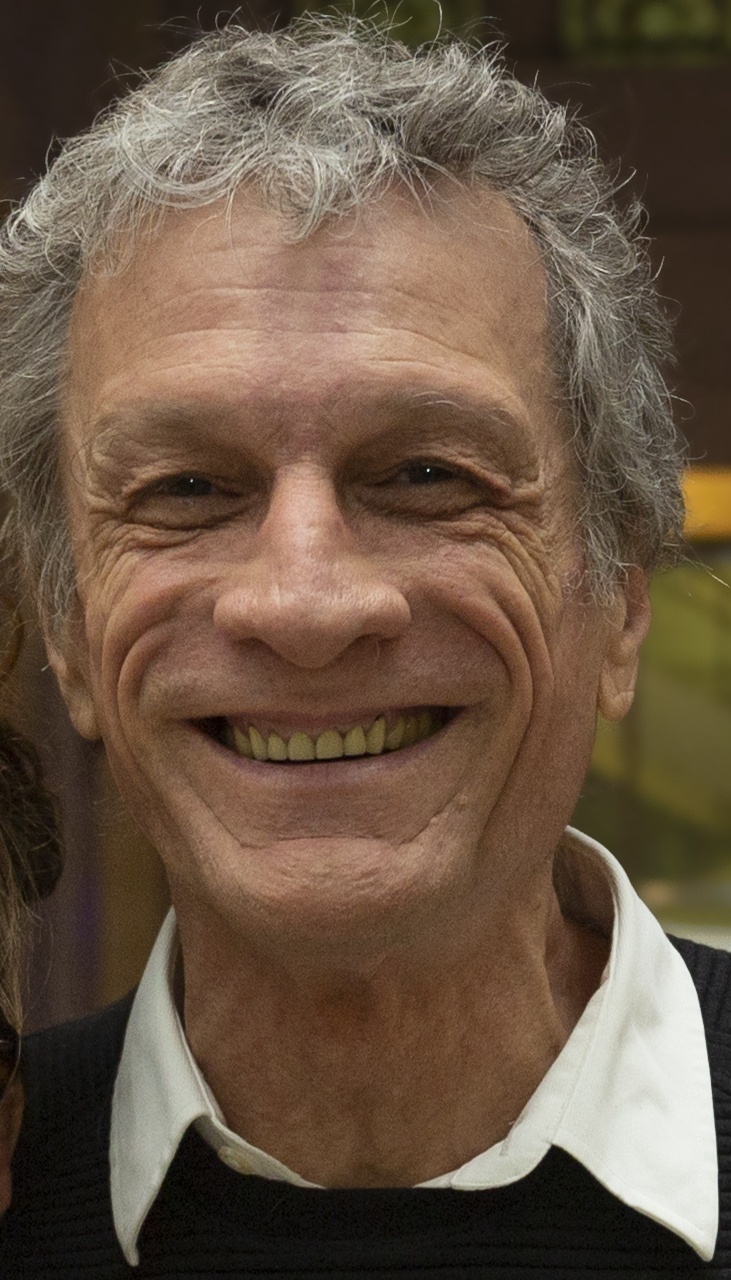
Daniel Fanego, Best Supporting Actor winner.

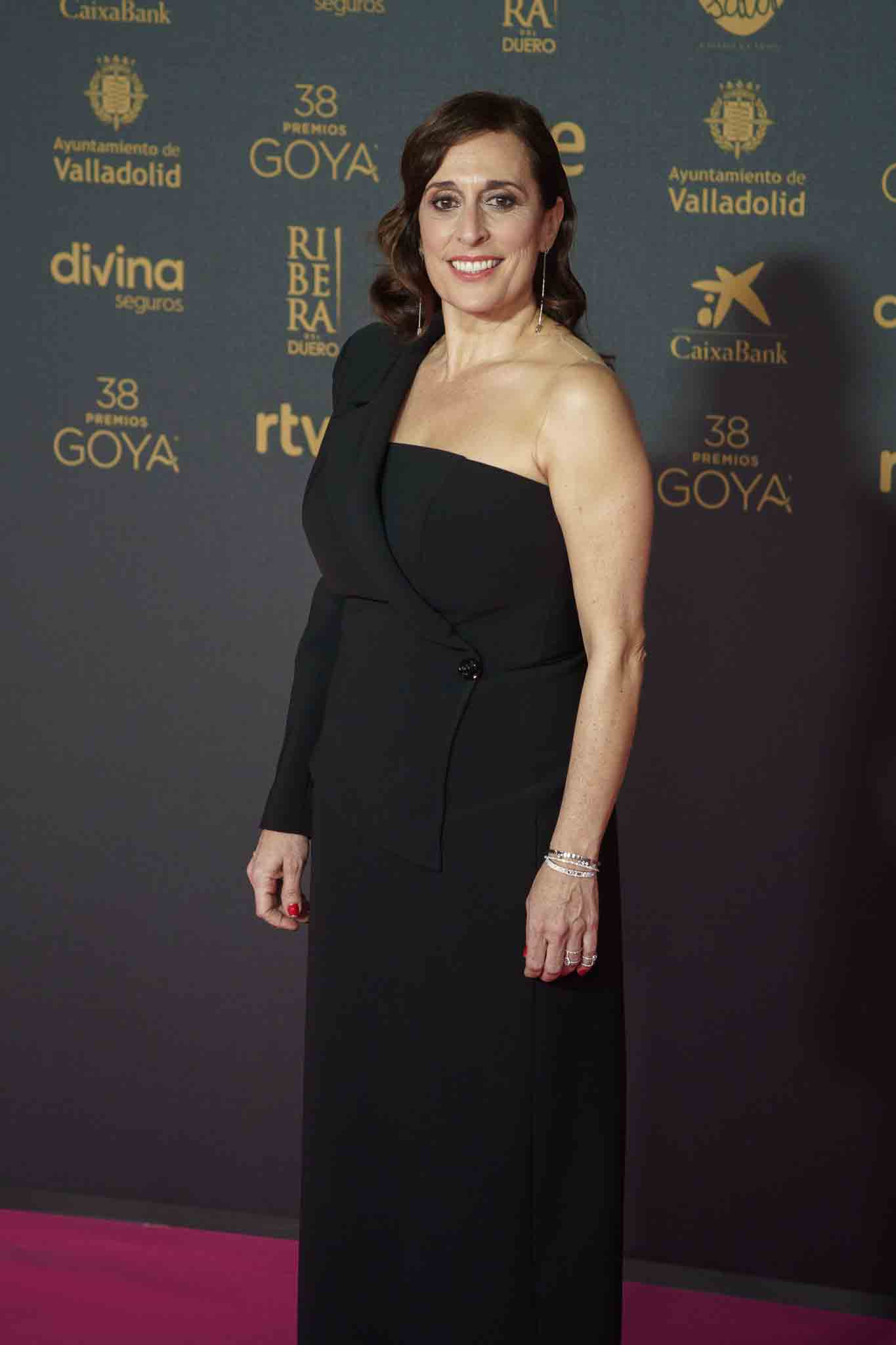
Clara Segura, Best Supporting Actress winner.

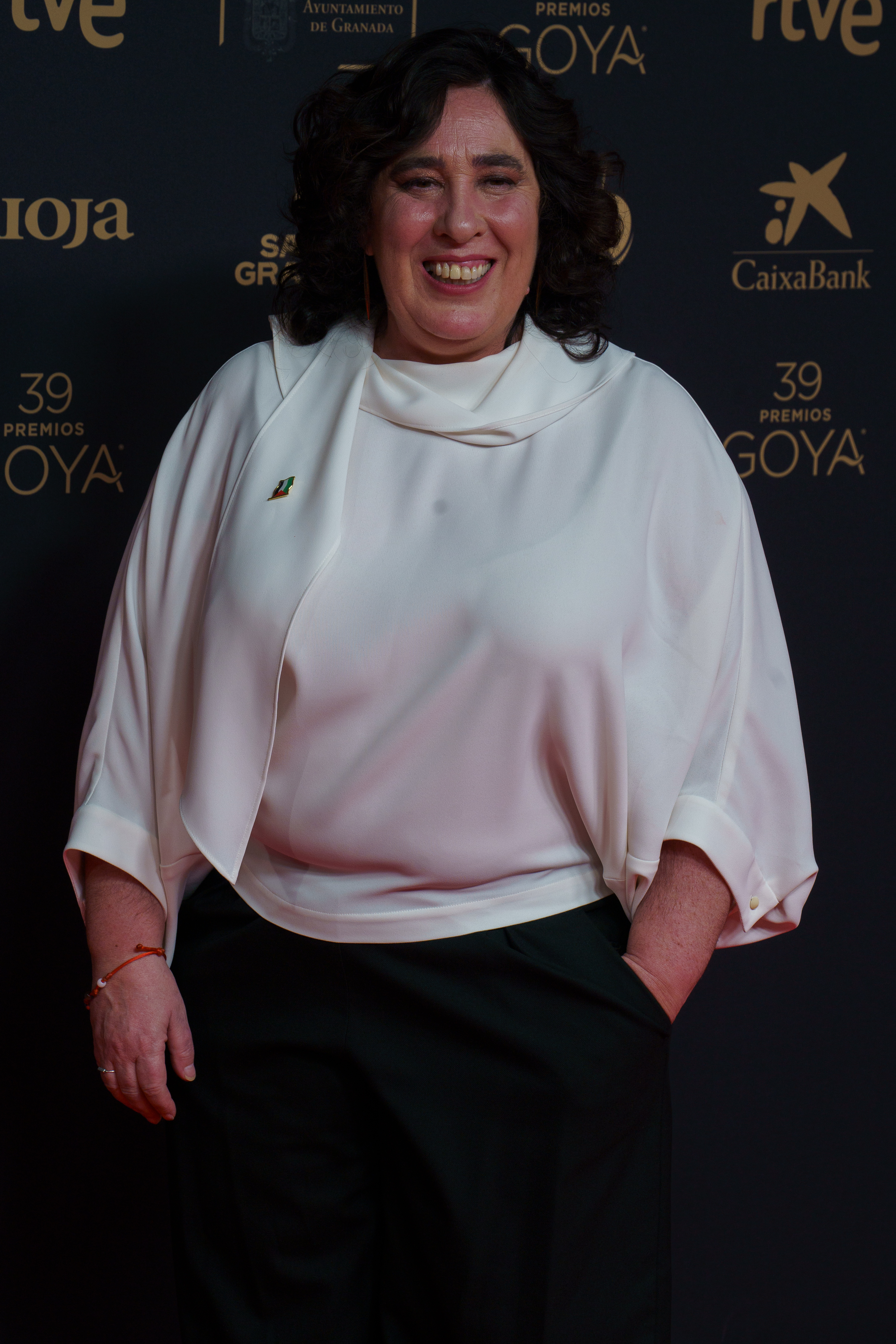
Arantxa Echevarría, Best Screenplay co-winner.

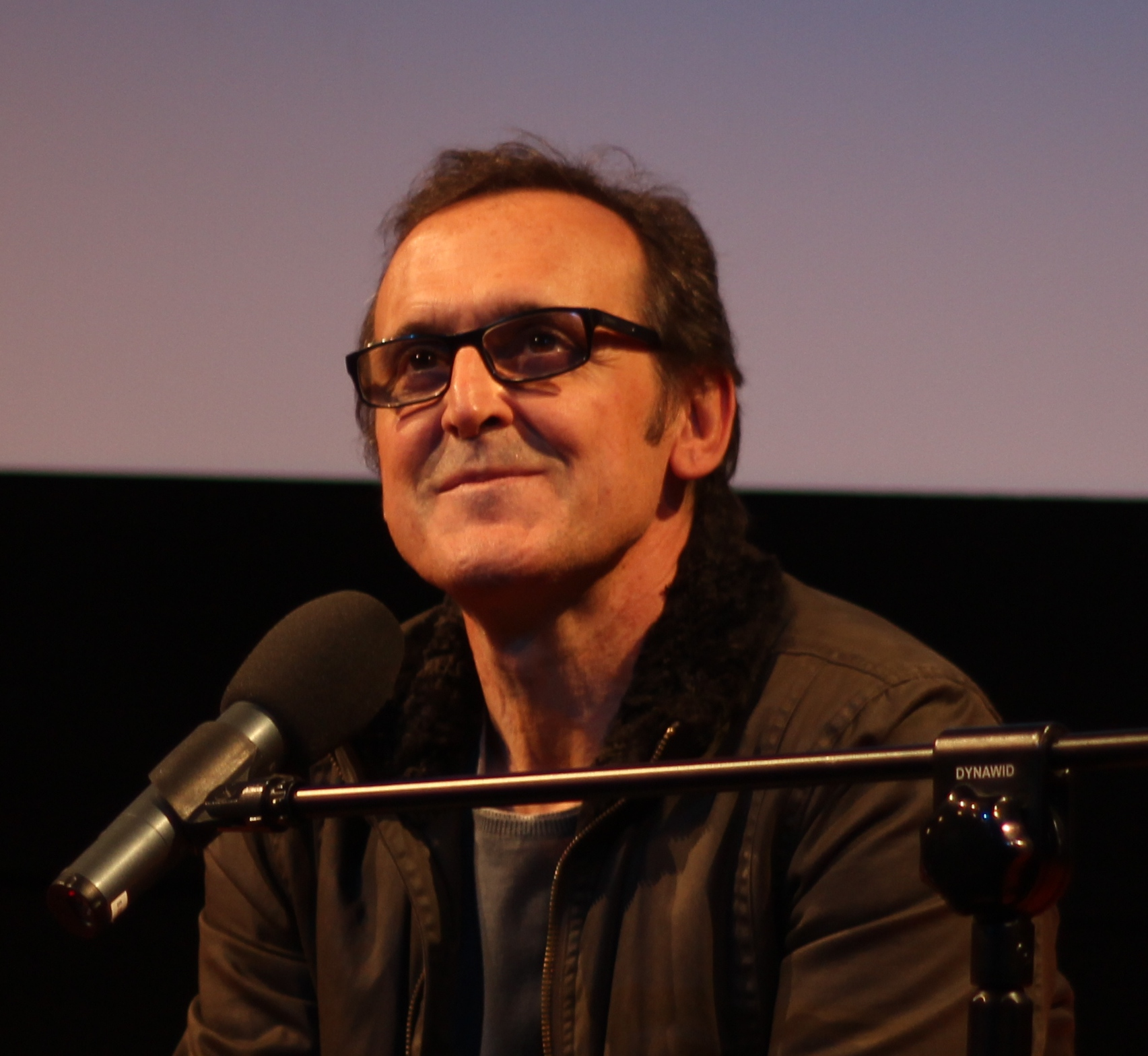
Alberto Iglesias, Best Original Score winner.

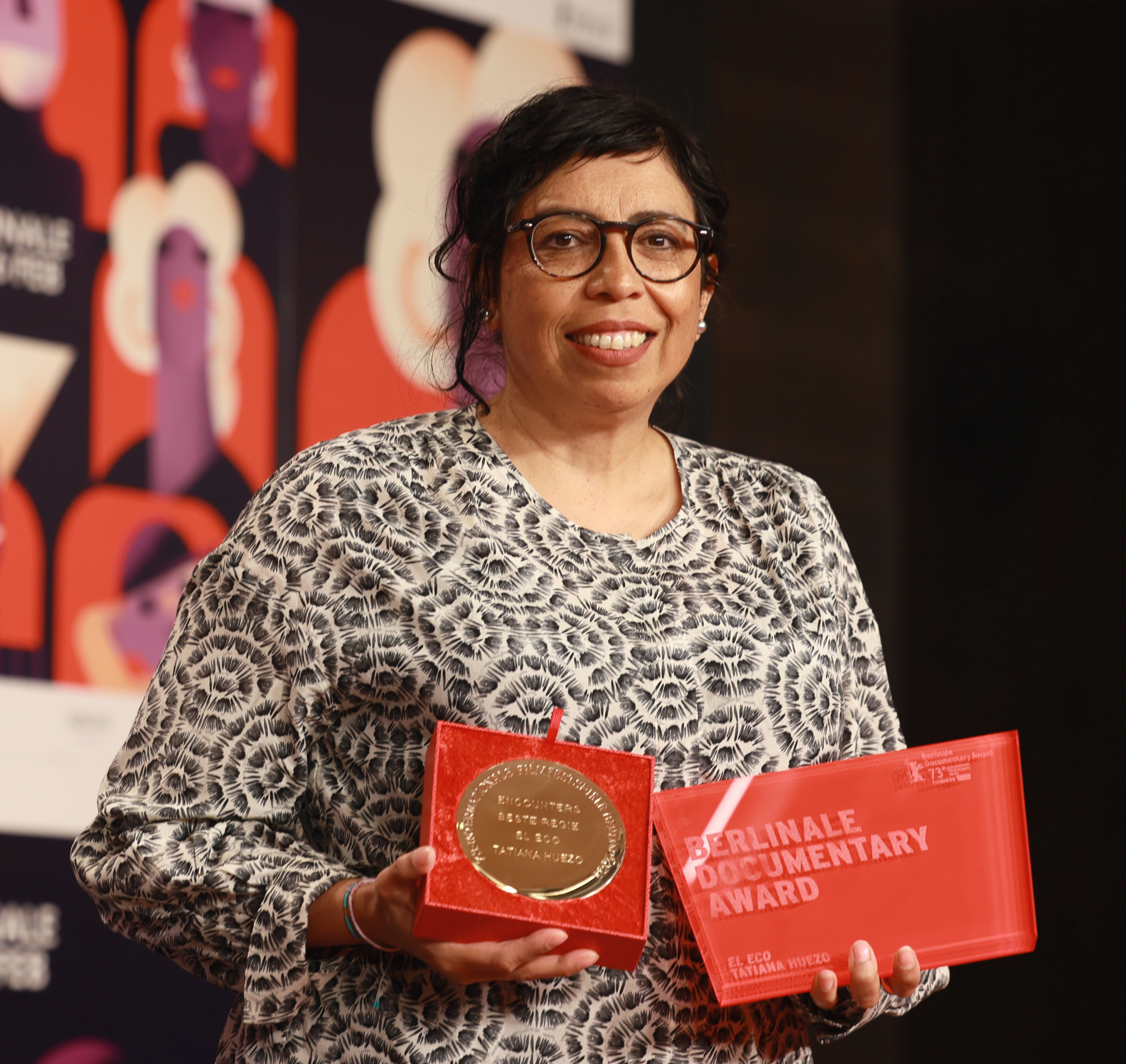
Tatiana Huezo, Best Documentary winner.

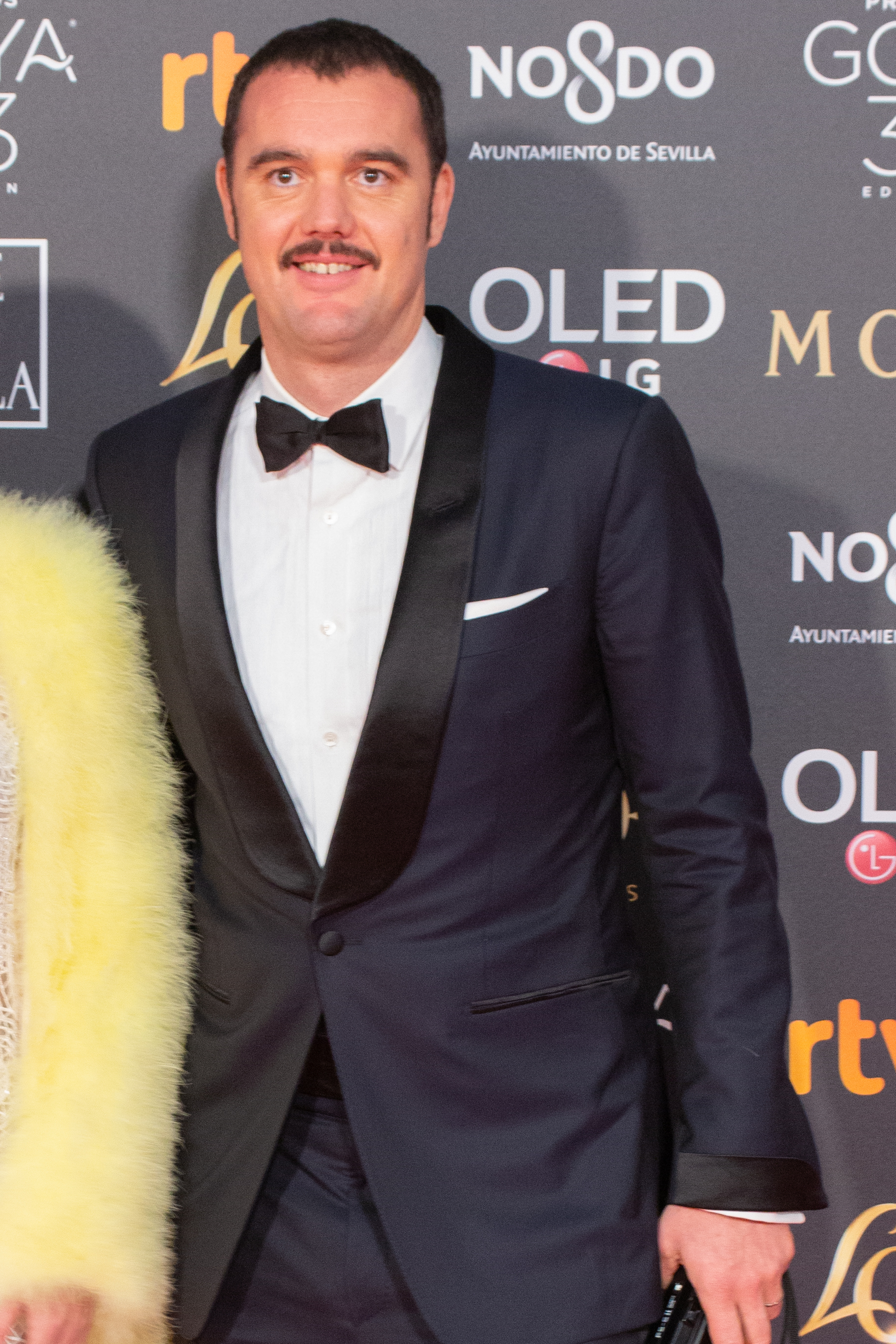
Eduard Grau, Best Cinematography winner.

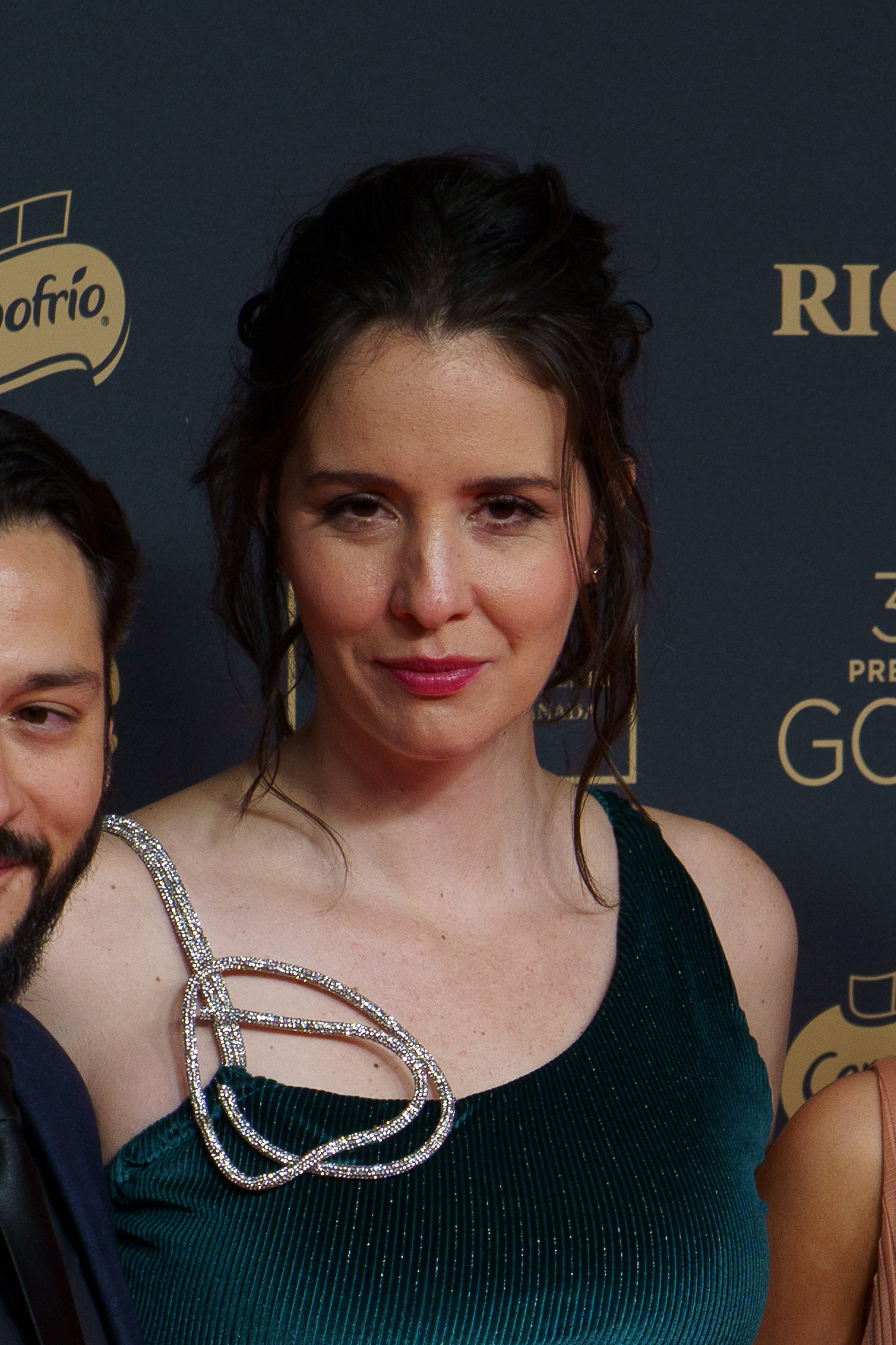
Antonella Sudasassi Furniss, Film and Values Education winner.

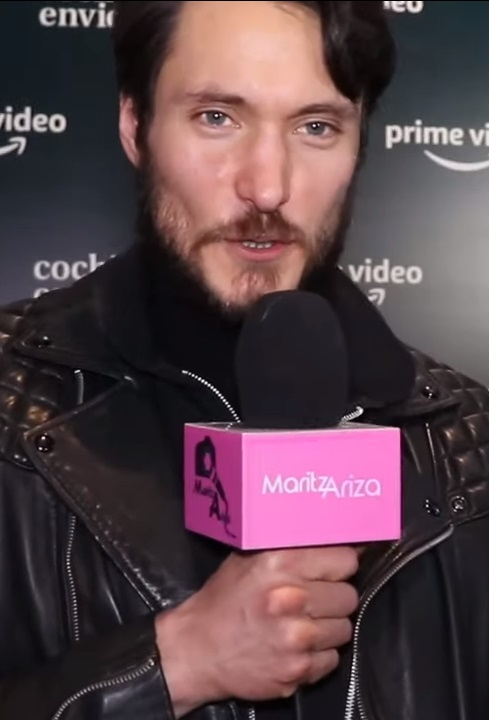
Claudio Cataño, Best Actor in a Miniseries or TV series winner.

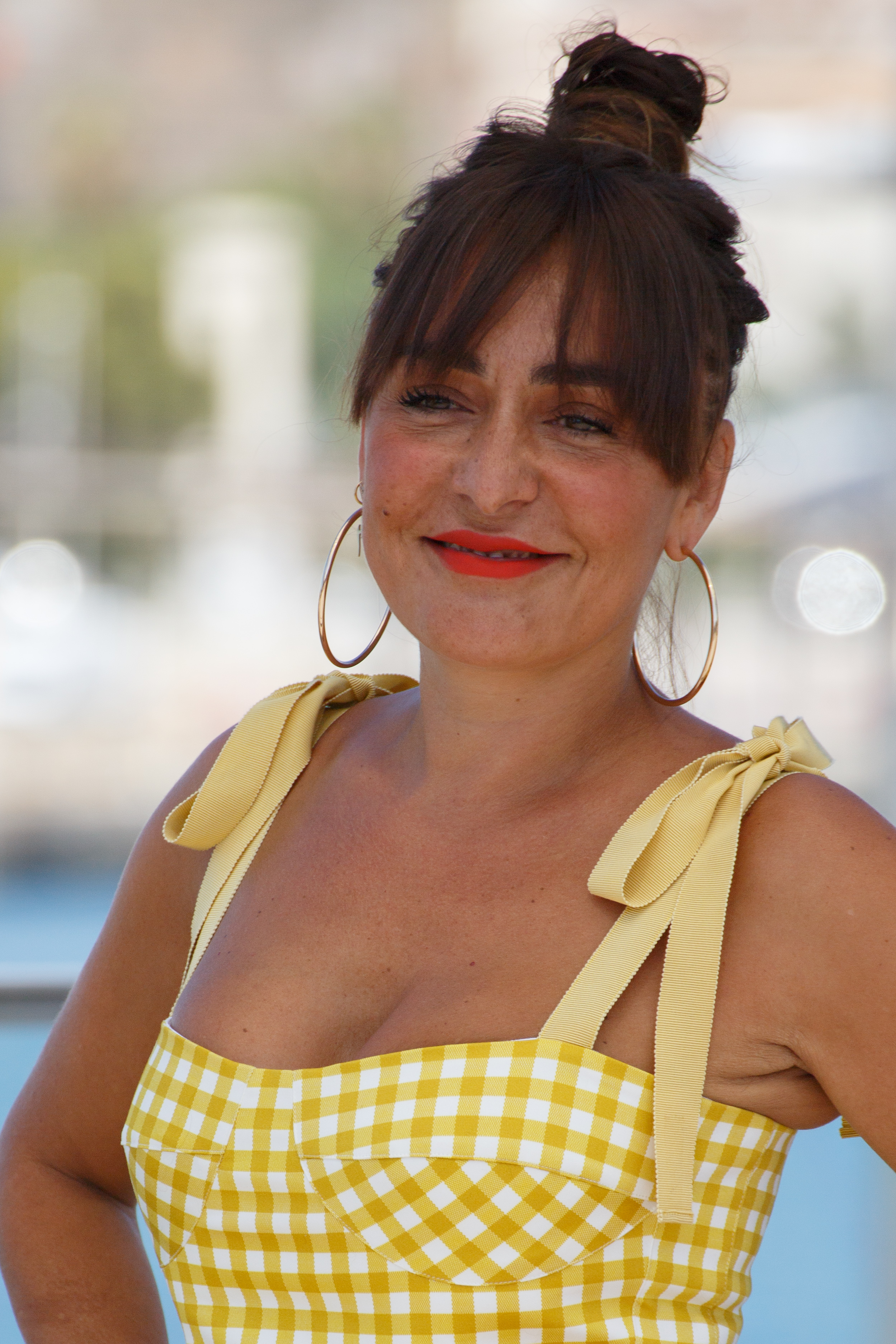
Candela Peña, Best Actress in a Miniseries or TV series winner.

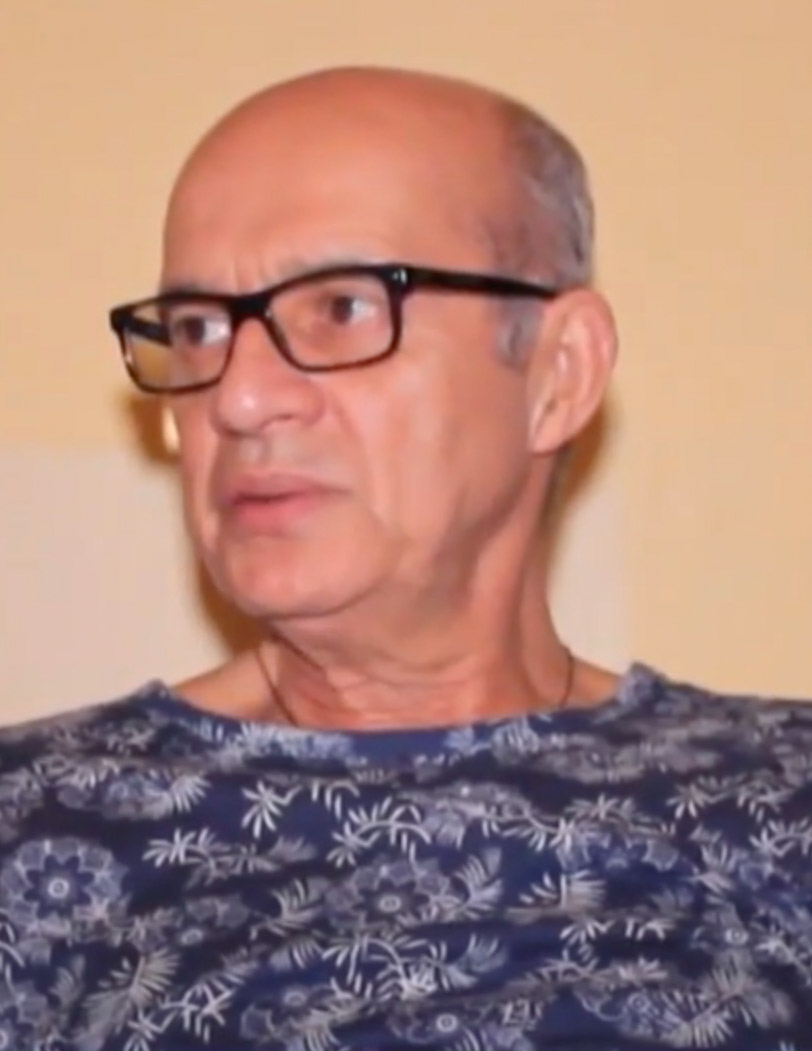
Jairo Camargo, Best Supporting Actor in a Miniseries or TV series winner.

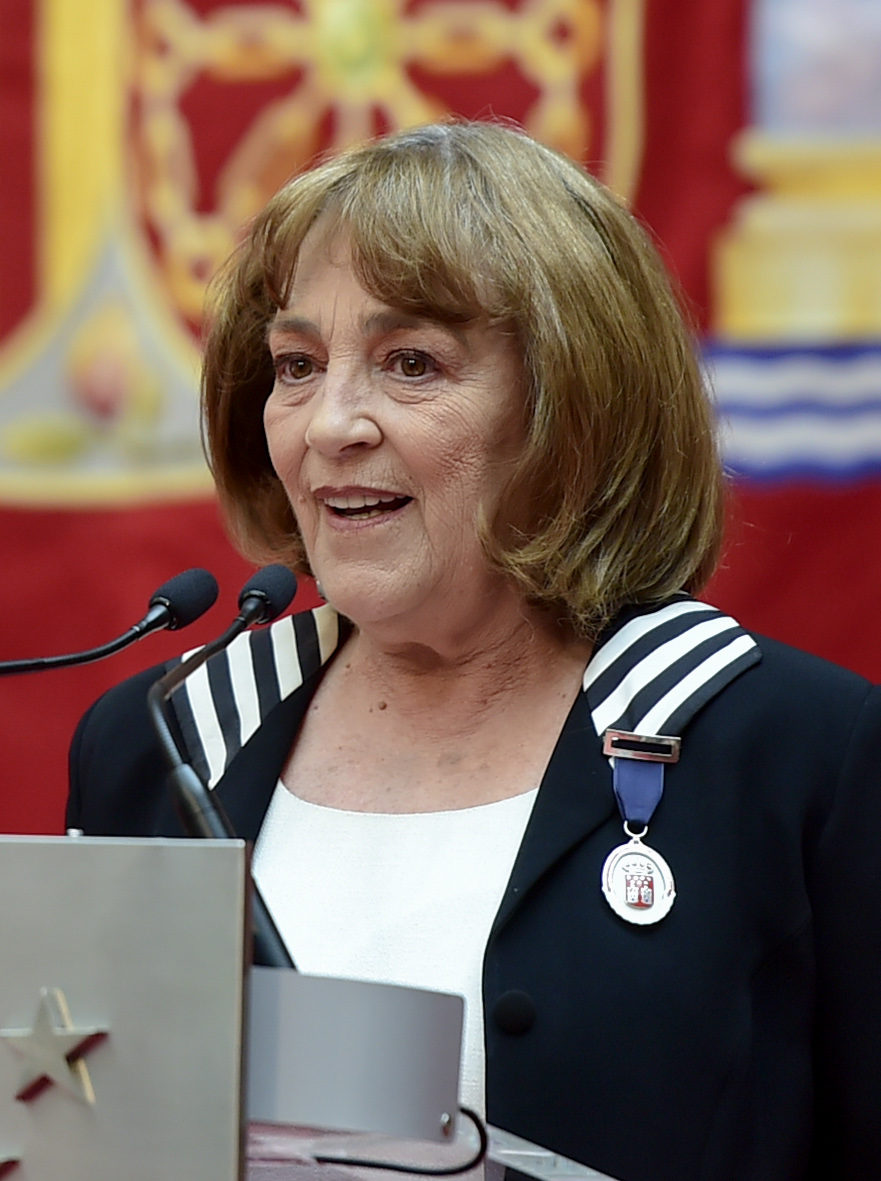
Carmen Maura, Best Supporting Actress in a Miniseries or TV series winner.

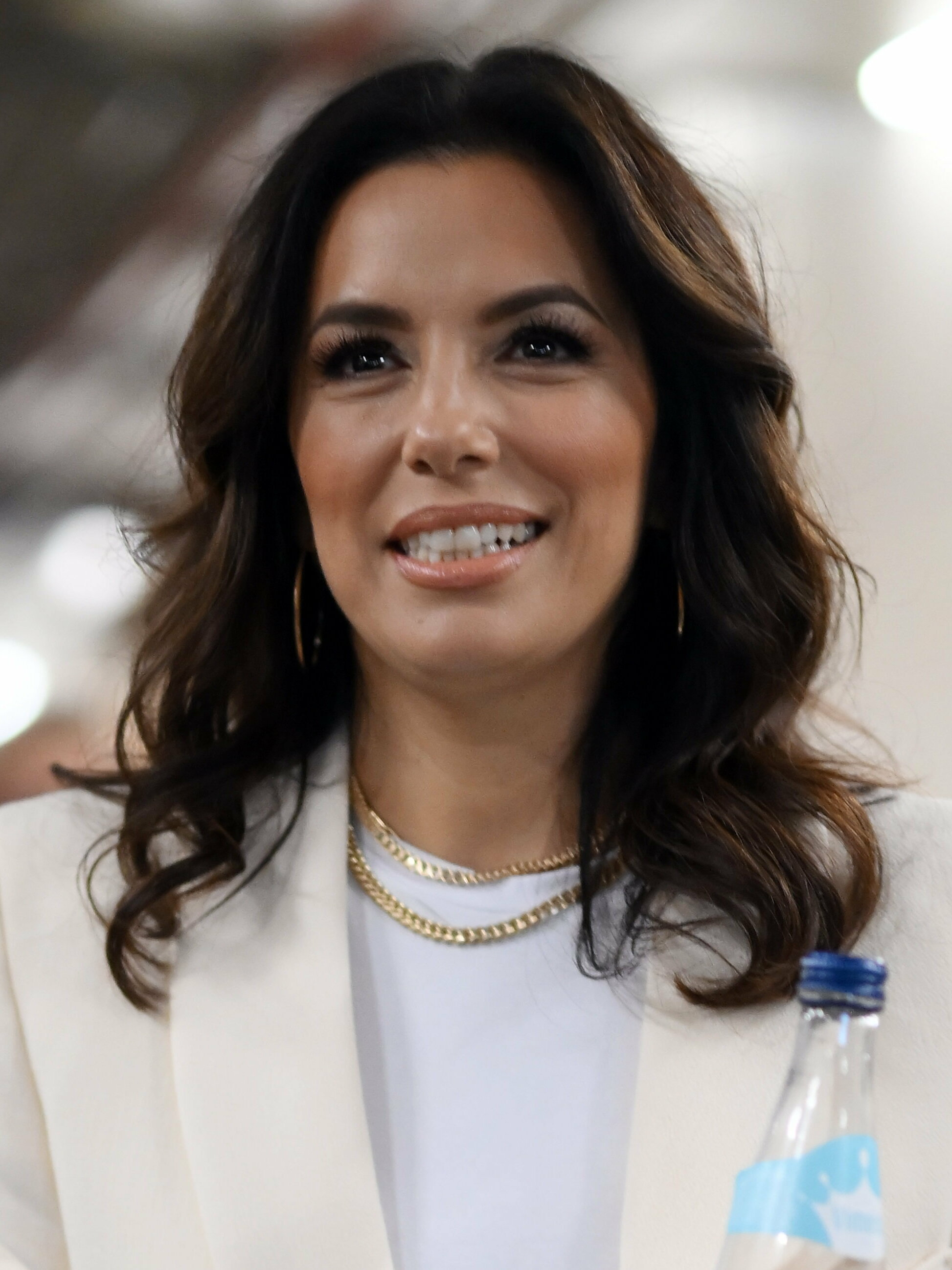
Eva Longoria, Honorary Platino Award recipient.

Winners are listed first and in bold.

=== Film ===
**Best Ibero-American Film**: **I'm Still Here**; The 47; Kill the Jockey; Grand Tour; Undercover	**Best Director**: **Walter Salles** – **I'm Still Here**; Arantxa Echevarría – Undercover; Luis Ortega – Kill the Jockey; Pedro Almodóvar – The Room Next Door
**Best Actor**: **Eduard Fernández** – **Marco, the Invented Truth** as Enric Marco; Luis Tosar – Undercover as Ángel Salcedo "El Inhumano"; Manuel García-Rulfo – Pedro Páramo as Pedro Páramo; Nahuel Pérez Biscayart – Kill the Jockey as Remo Manfredini / Dolores "Lola"	**Best Actress**: **Fernanda Torres** – **I'm Still Here** as Eunice Paiva; Carolina Yuste – Undercover as Mónica / Arantxa; Sol Carballo – Memories of a Burning Body as Woman; Úrsula Corberó – Kill the Jockey as Abril
**Best Supporting Actor**: **Daniel Fanego** – **Kill the Jockey** as Fanego; Darío Grandinetti – Nina as Pedro; Diego Anido – Undercover as Sergio Polo; Héctor Kotsifakis – Pedro Páramo as Fulgor Sedano	**Best Supporting Actress**: **Clara Segura** – **The 47** as Carmen; Francisca Lewin – In Her Place as María Carolina Geel; Ilse Salas – Pedro Páramo as Susana San Juan; Liliana Biamonte – Memories of a Burning Body as Mother
**Best Screenplay**: **Undercover** – **Arantxa Echevarría, Amèlia Mora**; Memories of a Burning Body – Antonella Sudasassi Furniss; A House on Fire – Eduard Sola; Rita – Jayro Bustamante; Kill the Jockey – Fabián Casas, Luis Ortega, Rodolfo Palacios	**Best Original Score**: **The Room Next Door** – **Alberto Iglesias**; Undercover – Fernando Velázquez; Pedro Páramo – Gustavo Santaolalla; La Invención de las Especies – Ulises Hernández
**Best Animated Film**: **Black Butterflies** – **David Baute**; Noah's Ark – Sérgio Machado, Alos di Leo; Captain Avispa – Jean Gabriel Guerra, Jonathan Melendez; Dalia and the Red Book – David Bisbano; Dragonkeeper – Salvador Simó, Li Jianping	**Best Documentary Film**: **The Echo** – **Tatiana Huezo**; The Flamenco Guitar of Yerai Cortés – Antón Álvarez; The Lost Children – Orlando von Einsiedel, Lali Houghton; Reas – Lola Arias
**Best Cinematography**: **The Room Next Door** – **Edu Grau**; Rita – Inti Briones; Undercover – Javier Salmones; Pedro Páramo – Rodrigo Prieto, Nico Aguilar	**Best Art Direction**: **Pedro Páramo** – **Eugenio Caballero, Carlos Y. Jacques**; Undercover – Eduardo Hidalgo; Kill the Jockey – Germán Maglieri, Julia Freid; The Red Virgin – Javier Alvariño
**Best Film Editing**: **Undercover** – **Victoria Lammers**; Rita – Jayro Bustamante; The Echo – Tatiana Huezo, Lucrecia Gutiérrez; Kill the Jockey – Rosario Suárez, Yibrán Asuad	**Best Sound**: **Saturn Return** – **Diana Sagrista, Alejandro Castillo, Eva Valiño, Antonin Dalmasso**; Una Noche con los Rolling Stones – Angie Hernández; Kill the Jockey – Guido Berenblum; Undercover – Jorge Castillo, Fabio Huete, Mayte Cabrera, Miriam Lisón
**Best Ibero-American Debut Film**: **The Dog Thief** – **Vinko Tomičić**; Alemania – María Zanetti; The Blue Star – Javier Macipe; Simon of the Mountain – Federico Luis	**Film and Values Education**: **Memories of a Burning Body** – **Antonella Sudasassi Furniss**; Alemania – María Zanetti; The Dog Thief – Vinko Tomičić; I'm Nevenka – Icíar Bollaín
**Best Ibero-American Comedy Film**: **Idol Affair**; Campamento con Mamá; El Candidato Honesto; Father There Is Only One 4

==== Films with multiple nominations ====
The following films received multiple nominations:

Nominations	Films
11	Undercover
9	Kill the Jockey
6	Pedro Páramo
4	Memories of a Burning Body
3	I'm Still Here
3	The Room Next Door
3	Rita
2	The 47
2	The Echo
2	Alemania
2	The Dog Thief

=== Television ===
**Best Ibero-American Miniseries or TV series**: **One Hundred Years of Solitude** (Netflix); City of God: The Fight Rages On (HBO / Max); Like Water for Chocolate (HBO); Senna (Netflix)	**Best Series Creator**: **Senna** – **Vicente Amorim, Fernando Coimbra, Luiz Bolognesi, Patrícia Andrade** (Netflix); El Secreto del Río – Alberto Barrera (Netflix); Like Water for Chocolate – Curro Royo (HBO); One Hundred Years of Solitude – José Rivera, Natalia Santa (Netflix)
**Best Actor in a Miniseries or TV series**: **Claudio Cataño** – **One Hundred Years of Solitude** as Colonel Aureliano Buendía (Netflix); Alberto San Juan – Cristóbal Balenciaga as Cristóbal Balenciaga (Disney+); Alexandre Rodrigues – City of God: The Fight Rages On as "Busca-pé" / Wilson Rodrigues (HBO / Max); Gabriel Leone – Senna as Ayrton Senna (Netflix)	**Best Actress in a Miniseries or TV series**: **Candela Peña** – **The Asunta Case** as Rosario Porto (Netflix); Andréia Horta – City of God: The Fight Rages On as Jerusa (HBO / Max); Azul Guaita – Like Water for Chocolate as Tita (HBO); Marleyda Soto – One Hundred Years of Solitude as Úrsula Iguarán (Netflix)
**Best Supporting Actor in a Miniseries or TV series**: **Jairo Camargo** – **One Hundred Years of Solitude** as Apolinar Moscote (Netflix); Benjamín Vicuña – Envious as Nicolás (Netflix); Hugo Bonemer – Senna as Nelson Piquet (Netflix); Janer Villareal – One Hundred Years of Solitude as Arcadio (Netflix)	**Best Supporting Actress in a Miniseries or TV series**: **Carmen Maura** – **Land of Women** as Julia (Apple TV+); Frida Sofía Cruz Salinas – El Secreto del Río as Sicarú / child Manuel (Netflix); Loren Sofía – One Hundred Years of Solitude as Amaranta (Netflix); Viña Machado – One Hundred Years of Solitude as Pilar Ternera (Netflix)

==== Series with multiple nominations ====
The following series received multiple nominations:

Nominations	Series
8	One Hundred Years of Solitude
4	Senna
3	City of God: The Fight Rages On
3	Like Water for Chocolate
2	El Secreto del Río

=== Platino Honorary Award ===
- Eva Longoria

== Presenters and performers ==
The following individuals, listed in order of appearance, presented awards.

=== Presenters ===
Presenters
Name(s)	Role
Ana Rujas; Valentina Zenere; Amaury Nolasco	Presented the award for Best First Feature Film and for Best Animated Film
Claudio Cataño; Marleyda Soto	Introduced One Hundred Years of Solitude
Laura Londoño; Enzo Vogrincic	Presented the awards for Best Supporting Actor in a Miniseries or TV series and Best Supporting Actress in a Miniseries or TV series
María Gabriela de Faría; Paco León; Daniela Ramírez	Presented the award for Best Documentary and for Best Original Score
Jerry Rodríguez; Jorge Tijerina	Introduced Like Water for Chocolate
Ana de la Reguera; Julio Peña; Ana María Orozco	Presented the award for Best Series Creator
Nahuel Pérez Biscayart	Introduced Kill the Jockey
Danilo Carrera; Cristo Fernández; Juana Acosta	Presented the award for Best Comedy Film
Salvador del Solar; Taz Skylar; Laura Ramos; Rodrigo Guirao	Presented the awards for Best Film Editing, Best Art Direction, Best Cinematography and Best Sound
Óscar de la Fuente	Introduced The 47
Renata Almeida Magalhães; Natalia Reyes; Sara Linares	Presented the award for Film and Values Education
Alexandre Rodrigues; Andréia Horta	Introduced City of God: The Fight Rages On
Adriana Barraza; Alfredo Castro	Presented the awards for Best Supporting Actor and Best Supporting Actress
Enrique Cerezo; Sofía Vergara	Presented the Platino Honorary Award
Caio Gullane; Fabiano Gullane	Introduced Senna
Mariana di Girolamo; Nico Furtado	Presented the awards for Best Actress in a Miniseries or TV series and Best Actor in a Miniseries or TV series
Rodrigo Teixeira	Introduced I'm Still Here
Juan Minujín; Mariela Garriga; Karla Sofía Gascón	Presented the award for Best Screenplay and for Best Director
Gonçalo Waddington; Crista Alfaiate	Introduced Grand Tour
Griselda Siciliani; Óscar Jaenada	Presented the awards for Best Actor and Best Actress
Miguel Ángel Silvestre; Kate del Castillo	Presented the award for Best Miniseries or TV series
Paz Vega; Eugenio Derbez; J. A. Bayona	Presented the award for Best Ibero-American Film

=== Performers ===
Artist(s)	Song(s)
Ballet Español de la Comunidad de Madrid	"La Quiero a Morir"
Pablo Alborán	"Clickbait"
Asier Etxeandia	"Castillos en el Aire"
Prince Royce	"Can't Help Falling in Love" "How Deep Is Your Love" "Dancing in the Moonlight"
