= Residue (TV series) =

- Genre: Science fiction; Horror
- Created by: John Harrison
- Written by: John Harrison
- Directed by: Alex García López
- Starring: Natalia Tena; Iwan Rheon; Jamie Draven; Danny Webb; Franz Drameh; Adrian Schiller; Eleanor Matsuura; Brian Fergunson; Emilia Jones; Tom Goodman-Hill
- Composer: Al Hardiman
- Country of origin: United Kingdom
- Original language: English
- No. of series: 1
- No. of episodes: 3

Production
- Executive producers: Hugo Heppell; Greg Phillips; Jonathan Ford; Alan Latham; Gideon Lyons; John Harrison
- Producer: Charlotte Walls
- Production locations: Yorkshire, England
- Cinematography: Felix Wiedemann
- Editors: Adam Green; Tracy Granger
- Running time: 44 minutes
- Production companies: LWH Entertainment; GSP Studios; Screen Yorkshire; Green Screen Productions; Art4noise

Original release
- Network: Netflix
- Release: 31 March 2015

Residue is a British science fiction supernatural horror miniseries created and written by John Harrison and directed by Alex García López. The first series, which consists of three episodes of 44 minutes each, entirely premiered on 31 March 2015 on the streaming service Netflix. Residue revolves around the aftermath of an explosion in an English futuristic metropolis nightclub and the unreliable quarantine zone built by the government, who is hiding what is really happening inside it. In the meantime, a photojournalist (portrayed by Natalia Tena) stumbles upon paranormal events triggered either by or after the bombing.

In 2015 producer Charlotte Walls stated that there were plans for a 10-episodes second season, for which Netflix would have the exclusive option. As of 2018, there has been no further news.

== Cast and characters ==
=== Main ===
- Natalia Tena as Jennifer Preston, a photojournalist who sees herself trapped in a web of paranormal activity after an explosion on New Year's Eve
- Iwan Rheon as Jonas Flack, Jennifer's boyfriend who works as the spokesperson of the government
- Jamie Draven as Levi Mathis, a police officer immersed in alcoholism and drug addiction. His daughter dies during the explosion, which triggers his will to uncover whatever it is that the government is hiding
- Danny Webb as Emeril Benedict
- Richard Calder as The Architect
- Franz Drameh as Willy G
- Adrian Schiller as Pierce
- Eleanor Matsuura as Angela Rossi, Jonas' superior, who is aware of what is truly happening in the quarantine zone but follows orders from Keller to conceal the truth
- Brian Fergunson as Dickie Prince
- Emilia Jones as Charlotte, a girl who survived the explosion and is hiding in the quarantine zone
- Tom Goodman-Hill as Keller
- John Lamontagne as Extra

== Production ==
Series creator John Harrison envisioned the idea of a science fiction production and brought it to producer Charlotte Walls shortly after they finished working on Book of Blood. Harrison and Walls teamed up to gather material to the production, which then was intended to be a film. Walls later got funding from the British companies International Pictures Four, Screen Yorkshire and Green Screen Studios. British director Alex García López, known for his work in Misfits, was later hired to direct the project. Through Lopez, Misfits actor Iwan Rheon joined the project. It was released theatrically in the United Kingdom on 20 March 2015 to a limited number of theaters. The project was later screened at the 2014 MIPCOM, where it was selected by Netflix and later released internationally as a limited series.

According to Walls, a 10-episodes second season is set to start being developed.

== Episodes ==
No.	Title	Directed by	Written by	Original release date
1	"Episode 1"	Alex García López	John Harrison	31 March 2015
There is an explosion at a club on New Year's Eve. Levi Mathis is a police officer struggling with alcohol and drug addiction, whose daughter died in the explosion. He is racked with guilt, as his wife blames him and his addiction for their daughter being out at the club. Jennifer Preston is a photojournalist who took a series of on-the-street portraits for a show. Unknown to both of them, the club and a housing estate is built on top of a secret government lab. A mysterious specter was released due to the explosion, which is now infecting citizens. One of Preston's subjects, living in the housing estate, is infected, driving him to kill his wife, child and himself. Mathis is assigned the case, and he suspects there is more than a simple murder-suicide. Preston's boyfriend, Jonas Flack, is a spokesperson of the government, helping the effort to keep the project and incident under wraps. His boss, Angela Rossi, knows what is really happening and keeps Jonas in the dark. Several other of Preston's subjects die. In the end, she sees the specter behind her subject in one of her photographs.
2	"Episode 2"	Alex García López	John Harrison	31 March 2015
3	"Episode 3"	Alex García López	John Harrison	31 March 2015

== Reception ==
Residue has received favorable response from critics. Writing for Observer, Drew Grant called the show a "must-see," saying that it is "an homage that feels creepily atmospheric in authentically original way, because this isn’t just some rich guy’s house that Tom Cruise stumbled upon. It’s a symptom of a growing sickness, pulsing its weird energies until it infects the entire populace." Brock Wilbur of Pajaba wrote that the experience of watching Residue is "rewarding" and "delight[ful]," affirming, "What starts as some grade-A neon-drenched abandoned architecture porn eventually spirals into an infestation of ghost-like entities driving the population of London to brutal violence, all under the watchful eye of a paramilitary group that knows more than it’s letting on."
