= One Hundred Years of Solitude (TV series) =

Colombian television series (2024–2026)

- Netflix poster
- Spanish: Cien años de soledad
- Genre: Drama; Magical realism
- Based on: One Hundred Years of Solitude by Gabriel García Márquez
- Written by: José Rivera; Natalia Santa; Camila Brugés; Albatrós González; María Camila Arias
- Directed by: Alex García López; Laura Mora; Carlos Moreno
- Starring: Claudio Cataño; Diego Vásquez; Marleyda Soto; Viña Machado; Loren Sofía; Janer Villarreal; Akima; Moreno Borja; Ruggero Pasquarelli
- Narrated by: Jesús Reyes
- Composers: Camilo Sanabria; Juancho Valencia
- Country of origin: Colombia
- Original languages: Spanish; Wayuu; English; French
- No. of seasons: 2
- No. of episodes: 16

Production
- Executive producers: Diego Ramírez Schrempp; Juliana Flórez Luna; Andrés Calderón; Josep Amorós; Carolina Caicedo; Alex García López; Laura Mora; José Rivera; Rodrigo García Barcha; Gonzalo García Barcha
- Producer: Josep Amorós
- Cinematography: Paulo Pérez; María Sarasvati Herrera; James Brown; Camilo Monsalve
- Editors: Irene Blecua; Miguel Schverdfinger; Luis Carballar; Sebastián Hernández
- Running time: 59–68 minutes
- Production company: Dynamo

Original release
- Network: Netflix
- Release: 11 December 2024 – 26 August 2026

One Hundred Years of Solitude (Spanish: Cien años de soledad, Latin American Spanish: [sjen ˈaɲos ðe soleˈðað]) is a Colombian television series based on Gabriel García Márquez's 1967 novel of the same name. The series ran for 16 episodes on Netflix, with the first eight episodes released on 11 December 2024. The second half was released on 5 August 2026, and the series finale was released on 26 August 2026.

== Cast ==
- Diego Vásquez as José Arcadio Buendía
  - Marco Antonio González Ospina as young José Arcadio Buendía
- Marleyda Soto as Úrsula Iguarán
  - Susana Morales Cañas as young Úrsula
- Édgar Vittorino as José Arcadio
  - Thiago Padilla as child José Arcadio
  - Andrius Leonardo Soto as teenage José Arcadio
- Claudio Cataño as Colonel Aureliano Buendía
  - Jerónimo Echeverría Monsalve as child Aureliano
  - Jerónimo Barón Lyentsova as adolescent Aureliano
  - Santi Vásquez as teenage Aureliano
- Loren Sofía as Amaranta
  - Luna Ruiz Jiménez as young Amaranta
- Akima as Rebeca
  - Nicole Montenegro Sánchez as young Rebeca
- Janer Villarreal as Arcadio
  - Juan Eduardo Florido as young Arcadio
- Viña Machado as Pilar Ternera
- Moreno Borja as Melquíades
- Ruggero Pasquarelli as Pietro Crespi
- Helber Sepúlveda Escobar as Prudencio Aguilar
- Jairo Camargo as Apolinar Moscote
- Jacqueline Arenal as Leonor Moscote
- Cristal Aparicio as Remedios Moscote
- Ella Becerra as Petronila
- Salvador del Solar as General Moncada
- Carla Baratta as Fernanda del Carpio (season 2)
- Estefanía Piñeres as Amaranta Úrsula (season 2)
- Emmanuel Restrepo as José Arcadio "El Papa" (season 2)
- Sebastián Osorio as Aureliano Babilonia (season 2)

== Episodes ==
=== Series overview ===
| Series | Episodes | Originally released | |
| Series | Episodes | First released | Last released |
|---|---|---|---|
| 1 | 8 | 11 December 2024 | |
| 2 | 8 | 5 August 2026 | 26 August 2026 |

=== Season 1 (2024) ===
| No. overall | No. in season | Title | Directed by | Original release date |
|---|---|---|---|---|
| 1 | 1 | "Macondo" | Alex García López | 11 December 2024 |
Cousins José Arcadio Buendía and Úrsula Iguarán are married against their family's wishes. Úrsula initially refuses to consummate the marriage, fearing that their children will be born with birth defects. After José Arcadio kills Prudencio Aguilar in a duel, he and Úrsula are haunted by Prudencio's ghost, forcing them to leave town and find a new home. As José Arcadio, Úrsula, and several of their friends trek through the wilderness, Úrsula goes into labor and delivers a baby boy named José Arcadio. They eventually establish the small village of Macondo, where they are visited by Melquíades and his band of Gypsies. Under Melquíades's influence, José Arcadio becomes withdrawn, immersing himself in science and exploration. Úrsula gives birth to a second son, Aureliano.
| 2 | 2 | "It's Like an Earthquake" (Es como un temblor de tierra) | Alex García López | 11 December 2024 |
Macondo grows into a small town. The Gypsies return, and Melquíades introduces José Arcadio to alchemy, causing him to withdraw further into his obsessions. When the Gypsies return again, they tell José Arcadio that Melquíades is dead. Úrsula gives birth to a third child, a daughter named Amaranta. Meanwhile, their older son, José Arcadio, is introduced to sex by Pilar Ternera and impregnates her. He then falls for a Gypsy girl and runs off with the Gypsies, leaving Pilar and his family heartbroken. Úrsula spends five months searching for him, but returns after discovering civilization on the other side of the swamp. Pilar gives birth to a baby boy, Arcadio, and José Arcadio and Úrsula raise him as their own.
| 3 | 3 | "A Daguerreotype of God" (Un daguerrotipo de Dios) | Alex García López | 11 December 2024 |
Following his brother's departure, Aureliano becomes isolated, spending his days in his father's laboratory. Rebeca, a young orphan, arrives at the Buendía home carrying a bag of her parents' bones. She is initially feral, but soon assimilates into the family, making Amaranta jealous. Rebeca falls ill with the "insomnia plague" and spreads it to the entire town. As the plague worsens, residents begin to experience amnesia, sending the town into chaos, but Melquíades returns from the dead with an antidote that cures everyone. Years later, Melquíades introduces the Buendías to the daguerreotype, and José Arcadio becomes obsessed with using it to capture God's image. Pietro Crespi arrives at the Buendía home to install a pianola, and Rebeca and Amaranta vie for his affections. The Colombian government appoints Apolinar Moscote magistrate of Macondo, angering José Arcadio.
| 4 | 4 | "The Chestnut Tree" (El castaño) | Laura Mora | 11 December 2024 |
José Arcadio and his men run Moscote out of town, but he returns with his family and a band of soldiers. Aureliano falls in love with Apolinar's youngest daughter, Remedios, while Rebeca exchanges love letters with Pietro. After a night out with friends, Aureliano blacks out and loses his virginity to Pilar. Pietro asks for Rebeca's hand in marriage, to the disappointment of Amaranta, who begins to self-harm and threaten suicide. Aureliano asks for Remedios's hand in marriage, but is told he must wait until she comes of age. Melquíades dies, sending Macondo into mourning. To cope with the loss, José Arcadio immerses himself in science and gradually slips into insanity. When he becomes hostile and paranoid, the men tie him to a chestnut tree in his garden. Melquíades's death, the first in Macondo, makes the dead aware of Macondo, prompting the arrival of Prudencio Aguilar.
| 5 | 5 | "Remedios Moscote" | Laura Mora | 11 December 2024 |
Aureliano and Remedios are married, while Rebeca's wedding to Pietro is postponed. As a daughter-in-law, Remedios brings sweetness and joy to the Buendía household, even tending to José Arcadio, who remains tied to the tree and speaks only in Latin. Pilar bears Aureliano's son, Aureliano José, and he and Remedios raise him as their own. Despite Macondo's secular history, the Moscotes fund the construction of a church. Apolinar persuades Arcadio to oversee Macondo's school, which gives him purpose. Not knowing his parentage, he tries to rape Pilar, but she thwarts him by arranging for him to take Santa Sofía de la Piedad, a young virgin, as a wife. Remedios falls pregnant with twins, but dies of a blood infection. The Buendías enter a mourning period that is cut short by the return of their oldest son, José Arcadio Jr.
| 6 | 6 | "Colonel Aureliano Buendía" (El coronel Aureliano Buendía) | Laura Mora | 11 December 2024 |
Apolinar Moscote announces Macondo's first election. With the help of Alirio Noguera, Arcadio forms a liberal opposition party, but Moscote rigs the election in favor of the conservatives. Rebeca and José Arcadio Jr. have an affair and decide to marry, which causes Úrsula to kick them out of the house. Apolinar declares a state of emergency, and the conservative army occupies Macondo and executes Noguera. Aureliano joins the liberal rebellion in retaking the town, earning him the title of colonel. He leaves Macondo with his band of soldiers to fight in the national civil war.
| 7 | 7 | "Arcadio and the Liberal Paradise" (Arcadio y el paraíso liberal) | Alex García López | 11 December 2024 |
Arcadio is appointed Civil and Military Chief of Macondo by Aureliano. He takes his job seriously, dressing like Napoleon Bonaparte and demanding loyalty from the locals, dividing the town. José Arcadio Jr. begins claiming other farms for his own, claiming they are Buendía lands. When the citizens complain to Arcadio, he legalizes José Arcadio Jr's actions, begins levying wartime taxes against the local businesses, and jails and executes dissidents. Aureliano is wounded in combat, but begins to attract a loyal following of soldiers and citizens. Pietro proposes to Amaranta, but she declines, driving him to suicide. Arcadio attempts to execute Moscote, but Úrsula, having received news of Aureliano's death while furious over Arcadio's tyrannical manner, spanks and humiliates him in front of the town, causing Úrsula to become the de facto leader of Macondo. A messenger, claiming to have been sent from a still-living Colonel Aureliano, tries to meet with Arcadio, but is jailed. Conservative forces take Macondo in a bloody battle. Moscote is killed, and Arcadio is executed.
| 8 | 8 | "So Many Flowers Fell from the Sky" (Tantas flores cayeron del cielo) | Alex García López | 11 December 2024 |
Colonel Aureliano is brought back to Macondo as a prisoner of war and sentenced to death by firing squad. On the day of his execution, José Arcadio Jr. and Rebeca rescue him at gunpoint, and the executioners defect to the rebellion. Amaranta begins raising Arcadio's children: Remedios the Beauty, and twin brothers José Arcadio Segundo and Aureliano Segundo. José Arcadio Jr. dies of a mysterious gunshot wound, and Rebeca becomes a hermit, never leaving her house again. Liberal politicians encourage Aureliano and his soldiers to sign an armistice with the Conservative government in exchange for political power, but he refuses, choosing to fight as a guerrilla. Aureliano's son, Aureliano José, and his aunt Amaranta become sexually attracted to each other. When Amaranta refuses to act on their desires, Aureliano José leaves town to join his father in the field. Conservative General José Raquel Moncada is appointed the new Civil and Military Chief of Macondo, demilitarizing the town and reopening the school. José Arcadio Buendía, the founder of Macondo, dies in his sleep. Colonel Aureliano and his forces attack Macondo.

=== Season 2 (2026) ===
| No. overall | No. in season | Title | Directed by | Original release date |
|---|---|---|---|---|
| 9 | 1 | "The Armistice" (El armisticio) | Laura Mora | 5 August 2026 |
Aureliano defeats Moncada and has him executed despite Úrsula's protests. Their falling out ends when Úrsula saves Aureliano from a poisoning incident. While Aureliano is away, Aureliano José is shot dead following an argument. Aureliano finally agrees to an armistice but shoots himself after signing the agreement.
| 10 | 2 | "The Queen of Madagascar" (La reina de Madagascar) | Laura Mora | 5 August 2026 |
Aureliano survives his suicide attempt, but feels humiliated and becomes a recluse. Aureliano later comes across his 17 illegitimate children, who are marked with an indelible cross at an Ash Wednesday mass. At the carnival, Fernanda del Carpio arrives from Bogotá and is crowned Queen of Madagascar. She catches Aureliano Segundo's attention but is interrupted when unidentified gunmen open fire on the crowd, killing dozens. Fernanda, Aureliano Segundo, and Remedios the Beauty seek shelter at the Buendía residence, but a paranoid Aureliano suspects Fernanda of plotting to assassinate him. Fernanda returns to Bogotá, but Aureliano Segundo pursues her and persuades her to marry him.
| 11 | 3 | "Fernanda del Carpio" | Carlos Moreno | 5 August 2026 |
The devout Fernanda is unsettled by the easygoing ways of the Buendías and of Macondo in general. She refuses to have sex with Aureliano Segundo immediately, causing him to enter into an affair with his concubine, Petra Cotes. Fernanda eventually gets pregnant, but leaves Aureliano Segundo when the latter admits his bigamy. At the last moment, Úrsula persuades Fernanda to stay, convincing her that she will become queen of the household. In exchange, Fernanda expels Aureliano Segundo from the house, causing him to move in with Petra.
| 12 | 4 | "The Innocent Train Had Arrived" (Había llegado el inocente tren) | Carlos Moreno | 5 August 2026 |
José Arcadio Segundo convinces authorities in Bogotá to bring the railroad to Macondo. Shortly afterwards, a group of American businessmen arrive in Macondo and take a liking to the local bananas. José Arcadio Segundo helps them purchase land in Macondo to set up a banana plantation on behalf of the United Fruit Company. Remedios the Beauty ascends to heaven.
| 13 | 5 | "It was October 11" (Fue un once de octubre) | Laura Mora | 5 August 2026 |
Aureliano's 17 illegitimate children are murdered one by one, sending him into a downward spiral that culminates in his death. Fernanda keeps a tight leash on her daughter, Meme, who becomes friends with the children of the United Fruit executives and becomes lovers with the company mechanic, Mauricio Babilonia. José Arcadio Segundo finds that United Fruit has been reneging on its promises to treat its workers fairly.
| 14 | 6 | "More than Three Thousand of Them" (Eran más de tres mil) | Laura Mora | 5 August 2026 |
Fernanda discovers Meme's relationship with Mauricio and arranges for the latter to be shot when he sneaks upon the Buendía residence, paralyzing him for life. In despair, Meme becomes a recluse and leaves Macondo for good. Amaranta senses her impending death and invites the townspeople to bring along messages for their departed that she would take along to the afterlife. José Arcadio Segundo launches a strike against United Fruit, but their demonstration is fired upon by government forces led by Cortés Vargas.
| 15 | 7 | "It Rained For Four Years, Eleven Months and Two Days" (Llovió cuatro años, once meses y dos días) | Carlos Moreno | 5 August 2026 |
As five years of nonstop rains inundate Macondo, José Arcadio Segundo wakes up and escapes from a train filled with corpses of murdered strikers. Traumatized and finding that no one in Macondo believes that the massacre happened, he retreats into the Buendía residence and studies Melquíades's writings. Fernanda gives birth to Amaranta Úrsula, but is interrupted by the arrival of a nun carrying Meme's infant child with Mauricio. Fernanda contemplates killing the child, but instead locks him up in a disused room. Five years later, Aureliano Segundo and Amaranta Úrsula discover the child, who is named Aureliano Babilonia and is accepted by the Buendía household, except by Fernanda. As the rains end, Úrsula dies after warning Aureliano Babilonia and Amaranta Úrsula against having an incestuous relationship. Her death is followed simultaneously by José Arcadio Segundo and Aureliano Segundo. Amaranta Úrsula leaves for Europe, while Santa Sofía leaves for an unknown destination. As Petra arrives to take custody of Aureliano Babilonia as part of her promise to Aureliano Segundo, Fernanda locks the child away for the second time.
| 16 | 8 | "One Hundred Years of Solitude" (Cien años de soledad) | Alex García López | 26 August 2026 |
Years pass as Macondo spirals into decline; an adult Aureliano Babilonia leaves the Buendía residence at Melquíades's suggestion to find books. Upon his return, he comes across Fernanda lying dead in her bed. Months later, Fernanda's son, José Arcadio, arrives from Rome and buries his mother before searching the house for Úrsula's wealth. He finds the treasure with the help of four youths and goes on a hedonistic spree with them, only for the quartet to kill him in a burglary. Meanwhile, Pilar Ternera dies and is buried after being the only person left who can recognize Aureliano and José Arcadio. Aureliano is then joined by Amaranta Úrsula and her husband, Gastón. When Gastón leaves on a business trip, Aureliano and Amaranta Úrsula enter into a sexual affair despite Úrsula's warnings. Months later, Amaranta Úrsula gives birth to an infant with birth defects before dying from complications. A despondent Aureliano leaves the baby to be eaten alive by ants as he finally manages to decipher Melquíades's manuscripts, predicting the end of Macondo and the extinction of the Buendía line as a windstorm destroys the town, leaving Macondo to perish and fade away from existence.

== Production ==
=== Development ===
Netflix acquired the rights to One Hundred Years of Solitude in March 2019. Before his death in 2014, author Gabriel García Márquez had refused to sell the rights to the novel as he did not believe the time constraints of a feature film were sufficient for a proper adaptation. The series was filmed with the support of García Márquez's family, who requested that it be shot in Colombia, in Spanish, and with Colombian actors. The producers scouted several locations for filming, including Cali, Villavicencio, Girardot, Palomino, Santa Marta, and Barranquilla.

As a filmmaker, as a Colombian, it has been an honor and an enormous challenge to work on a project of the complexity and responsibility of One Hundred Years of Solitude, always trying to understand the difference between literary and audiovisual language, to be able to construct images that contain something of the beauty, poetry and depth of a work that has impacted the entire world. We have done it with love and respect for the novel, with the help of an exceptional technical and human team.

— Director Laura Mora

=== Casting ===
The cast was chosen through an open casting call in 2022. The casting team saw more than 10,000 candidates for the 25 main roles. Only 30% of the cast were professional actors. In addition to the main cast, 20,000 extras were selected. The cast was partially leaked on 26 April 2023.

=== Filming ===
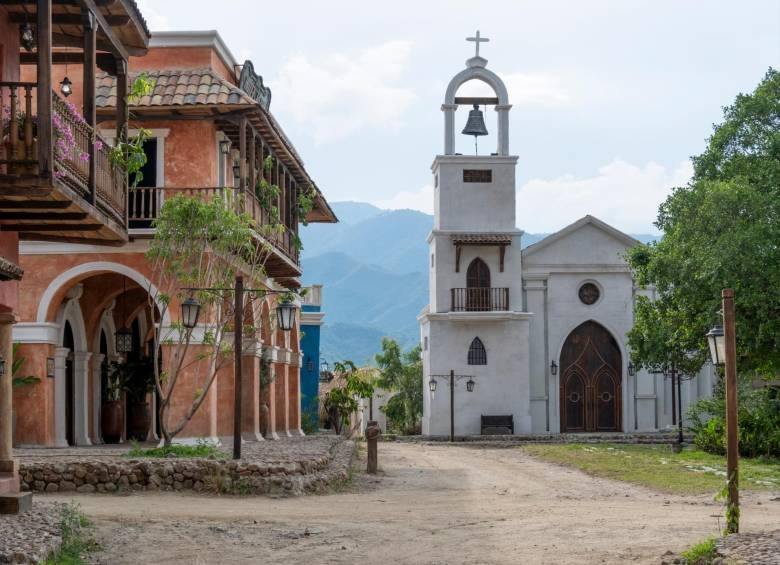
The fictional town of Macondo was constructed near Alvarado, Tolima.

Principal photography on the first part of the series took place from May to December 2023. The series was filmed entirely in Colombia, specifically in the departments of La Guajira, Magdalena, Cesar, Cundinamarca, and Tolima. The fictional town of Macondo was built near Alvarado, Tolima, by 1,100 workers. Four versions of the town were built to depict the passage of time. The producers purchased furniture from local antique stores and had fabrics and artifacts made by local artisans for the sets. Filming required a crew of nearly 600 people, all from Colombia. Netflix reported that the production of the series generated 225 billion COP ($51.8 million USD) for Colombia's economy.

Production on the second part of the series began in February 2025.

== Release ==
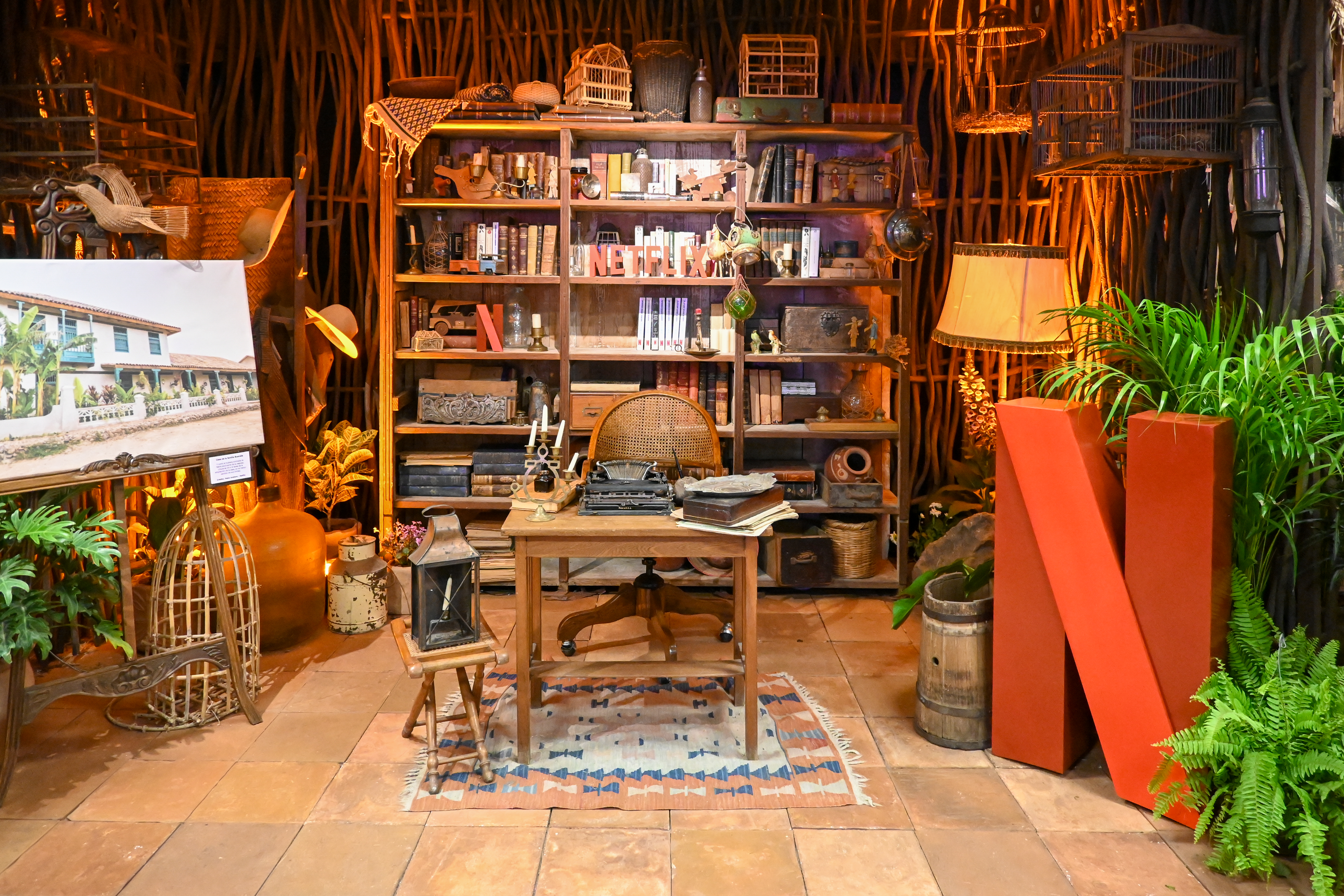
A promotional display for the series at the Guadalajara International Book Fair in December 2024

A teaser trailer for the first season was released on 17 April 2024. Promotional stills were released on 18 October. The first two episodes premiered at the Círculo de Bellas Artes in Madrid on 22 November 2024. The series' first episode screened at the Biblioteca Vasconcelos in Mexico City on 28 November 2024. Its first two episodes were screened at the Havana Film Festival on 6 December 2024. The first season, comprising eight episodes, was released in its entirety on Netflix on 11 December 2024.

A trailer for the second season was released on 17 July 2026. The second season was released in two parts; the first seven episodes were released on 5 August 2026 and the series finale was released on 26 August 2026. To promote the second season, Netflix held special screenings in selected Colombian cities.

== Reception ==
On the review aggregator website Rotten Tomatoes, 93% of 30 critics' reviews are positive, with an average rating of 7.9/10. The website's consensus reads: "One Hundred Years of Solitude faithfully realizes Gabriel García Márquez's seminal novel with sumptuous polish, making for an adaptation that is nothing short of magical." On Metacritic, it has a weighted average score of 80 out of 100, based on 16 critics, indicating "generally favorable" reviews.

Keith Watson of The Telegraph rated the series five stars out of five, calling it a "faithful but not overly reverent take on Márquez". He commended the cast's performances, specifically those of Marleyda Soto and Claudio Cataño. Helen Coffey of The Independent called the series "pretty much perfect" and "nothing short of miraculous". She commended the series' creators for staying faithful to the source material while creating "a piece of visually gorgeous storytelling". She also commended the casting, script, cinematography, and music. Julio Ricardo Varela of MSNBC wrote that the series provides "countless moments of brilliance that prove creating art from other works of art is still possible." He commended the performances of the entire cast, especially Soto, Cataño, and Marco Antonio González, and noted the care that seemed to have gone into the series' production. Judy Berman of Time wrote, "Considering the difficulty of the assignment, it's remarkable how close Netflix's splendid One Hundred Years of Solitude . . . comes to recreating not just the substance, but also the kinetic spirit of the book." She wrote that the series successfully conveyed the story of the novel without oversimplifying its major themes, including the "ugly but symbolically meaningful aspects of the story, from self-harm to incest". She commended the series' production value, direction, and cinematography.

Daniel Fienberg of The Hollywood Reporter called the series a "gorgeous, ambitious adaptation" of the novel that is "honorable and beautiful, if not without flaws". He noted that much of the series' content was taken verbatim from the novel, which "doesn't always work" on screen, and that "everything plays better when the show is at its most figurative and least literal". He commended García López and Mora's direction, calling the series "breathlessly beautiful at times, lyrical and alive and brimming with visual and intellectual ideas." He concluded, "One Hundred Years of Solitude may not be as good as Underground Railroad or even Station Eleven, but it's a worthy and admirable capper for a year of often exceptional prestige adaptations." Aramide Tinubu of Variety called the series "exquisitely detailed and layered in intricate symbolism" and "one of the most faithful page-to-screen adaptations in recent years". She called the performances "exceptional", but said that certain sequences felt dense. Although she found the pacing "too lackadaisical at times", she wrote, "the beauty of One Hundred Years of Solitude allows the viewer to absorb every intricately curated frame and moment." Carly Lane of Collider called the series "a masterpiece in its own right" and wrote, "Not only does the Spanish-language series breathe new life into Márquez's supposedly unfilmable novel, but it also succeeds as a triumph of filmmaking thanks to stunning cinematography and an epic story that spans across multiple generations of the ill-fated Buendía family." She commended the visuals of Paulo Pérez and María Sarasvati, the production design of Eugenio Caballero and Bárbara Enríquez, and the ensemble's performance.

Jack Seale of The Guardian rated the series three stars out of five, writing that it "might struggle with the novel's problematic sexual politics, but it's a big, gorgeous adaptation". Ed Potton of The Times rated the series two stars out of five, calling it "gorgeous but lethargic" and writing that it "lacks the vibrancy and energy of the novel". He commended the production design of Caballero and Enríquez, but said the series struggled to translate magic realism to the screen.

== Awards and nominations ==
| Award | Year | Category | Nominee | Result | Ref. |
|---|---|---|---|---|---|
| Gotham TV Awards | 2025 | Breakthrough Drama Series | One Hundred Years of Solitude | Nominated | |
| Peabody Awards | 2025 | Entertainment | One Hundred Years of Solitude | Nominated | |
| Platino Awards | 2025 | Best Ibero-American Miniseries or TV series | One Hundred Years of Solitude | Won | |
| Platino Awards | 2025 | Best Series Creator | José Rivera, Natalia Santa | Nominated | |
| Platino Awards | 2025 | Best Actor in a Miniseries or TV series | Claudio Cataño | Won | |
| Platino Awards | 2025 | Best Actress in a Miniseries or TV series | Marleyda Soto | Nominated | |
| Platino Awards | 2025 | Best Supporting Actor in a Miniseries or TV series | Jairo Camargo | Won | |
| Platino Awards | 2025 | Best Supporting Actor in a Miniseries or TV series | Janer Villareal | Nominated | |
| Platino Awards | 2025 | Best Supporting Actress in a Miniseries or TV series | Loren Sofía | Nominated | |
| Platino Awards | 2025 | Best Supporting Actress in a Miniseries or TV series | Viña Machado | Nominated | |
| Premios Aura | 2025 | Highest Impact | One Hundred Years of Solitude | Won | |
| Premios Aura | 2025 | Best Executive Production | One Hundred Years of Solitude | Won | |
| Premios India Catalina | 2025 | Best Fiction Series | One Hundred Years of Solitude | Won | |
| Premios India Catalina | 2025 | Best Fiction Director | Laura Mora, Alex García López | Nominated | |
| Premios India Catalina | 2025 | Best Fiction Script | Jose Rivera, Camila Brugés, Natalia Santa | Won | |
| Premios India Catalina | 2025 | Best Leading Actor | Claudio Cataño | Won | |
| Premios India Catalina | 2025 | Best Leading Actress | Marleyda Soto | Won | |
| Premios India Catalina | 2025 | Best Supporting Actor | Diego Vásquez | Won | |
| Premios India Catalina | 2025 | Best Supporting Actress | Viña Machado | Won | |
| Premios India Catalina | 2025 | Breakthrough Actor of the Year | Susana Morales | Won | |
| Premios India Catalina | 2025 | Best Young Talent | Cristal Aparicio | Won | |
| Premios India Catalina | 2025 | Best Fiction Editing | Irene Blecua, Miguel Schverdfinger | Won | |
| Premios India Catalina | 2025 | Best Fiction Cinematography | Paulo Pérez, María Sarasvati Herrera | Won | |
| Premios India Catalina | 2025 | Best Fiction Production Design | Eugenio Caballero, Bárbara Enríquez | Won | |
| Premios India Catalina | 2025 | Best Fiction Score | Camilo Sanabria, Juancho Valencia | Won | |
| Premios India Catalina | 2025 | Audience Favorite Fiction Series | One Hundred Years of Solitude | Won | |
| Set Decorators Society of America Awards | 2025 | Best Achievement in Décor/Design of a One Hour Period Series | Arley Garzón Gómez, Catalina Angulo, Rafael Withingham, Angela Benavides, Barbara Enriquez & Eugenio Caballero | Nominated | |
