= Las Villamizar =

Colombian telenovela

- Genre: Telenovela
- Created by: Juan Carlos Aparicio Schlesinger
- Written by: Juan Carlos Aparicio Schlesinger; Mateo Stivelberg Botero
- Directed by: Mateo Stivelberg; Herney Luna
- Starring: Shany Nadan; María José Vargas; Estefanía Piñeres
- Music by: José Ricuarte Ardila
- Country of origin: Colombia
- Original language: Spanish
- No. of seasons: 1
- No. of episodes: 72

Production
- Executive producer: Juan Carlos Villamizar Delgado
- Editors: Juan Pablo Serna Rozo; Diego Ospina
- Production company: Caracol Televisión

Original release
- Network: Caracol Televisión
- Release: 18 April – 2 August 2022

Las Villamizar (English title: Blood Sisters) is a Colombian telenovela created by Juan Carlos Aparicio. It aired on Caracol Televisión from 18 April 2022 to 2 August 2022. Set in the midst of the Spanish Reconquest in 1816, the telenovela follows three high society sisters on a mission to avenge their mother, killed by the Spanish army.

The telenovela stars Shany Nadan, María José Vargas, and Estefanía Piñeres.

== Plot ==
Carolina, Leonor and Isabela are three sisters from the high society of El Socorro. They join the Liberator Army as spies motivated to pursue those responsible for the death of their mother, Beatriz de Villamizar, at the hands of Captain José María Montenegro. Gerardo Villamizar, using his military past within the Commoners Movement, prepares his three daughters in different disciplines of combat, infiltration and sabotage. The three sisters carry out missions and assignments given to them by the Independence Army, and in return, the army gives them information on the location of the culprits so that they can intercept the murderers and accomplices of Montenegro and thus bring justice.

== Cast ==
=== Main ===
- Shany Nadan as Carolina Mariana de la Trinidad Villamizar Montero
- María José Vargas as Isabela Francisca Dominga Villamizar Montero
- Estefanía Piñeres as Leonor María de la Santa Cruz Villamizar Montero
- Rodrigo Poisón Barroso as José María Montenegro
- Eloi Costa as Julián Mauricio del Sagrado Corazón de Jesús Montenegro
- Claudio Cataño as Aurelio Velásquez
- Alexandra Restrepo as Eulalia
- Rafael Zea as Manuel Albarracín
- Jacques Toukhmanian
- Roberto Cano as Bartolomé
- Juan Manuel Hernández
- Nidia Paola Valencia
- Brian Moreno as Federico Bravo Cuellar
- Fernando Campo
- Fernando Solórzano as Horacio Cuervo
- Carlos García as Tobón
- Luis Mesa as Gerardo Villamizar

=== Recurring and guest ===
- Juan Andrés Guerrero
- Santiago Soto
- Coraima Torres as Beatriz María de Jesús Montero de Villamizar
- Juan Carlos Ortega
- Sara Pinzón
- Angie Carolina Robles
- Obeida Benavides
- Edwin Hernán García
- Cristal Aparicio
- Carlos Amado Velaides
- Alanna de la Rossa
- Juan José Franco
- Quique Sanmartín
- Lenny Manuel Niño
- Andrés Guede
- Martha Viviana Hernández
- Alejandro Rodríguez

== Production ==
The telenovela was announced on 29 July 2019. Filming began on 9 February 2021.

== Release ==
Las Villamizar premiered on Caracol Televisión on 18 April 2022. Internationally, the show began streaming on Netflix on 14 December 2022, under the title Blood Ties.

== Episodes ==
No.	Title	Original release date	Colombia viewers (Rating points)
1	"Un amor no correspondido cobra su primera víctima e incita la búsqueda de justicia"	18 April 2022	9.6
2	"Las Villamizar tienen que conseguir la justicia que doña Beatriz no tuvo"	19 April 2022	10.0
3	"Gerardo lo entrega todo para conseguir que sus hijas continúen con la misión"	20 April 2022	10.8
4	"El coronel Montenegro ordena detener a cada uno de los insurgentes"	21 April 2022	10.3
5	"Carolina conoce los planos arquitectónicos de la quinta de los Múnera"	22 April 2022	8.9
6	"Las hermanas Villamizar tienen su primer prisionero"	25 April 2022	9.5
7	"La justicia se impone ante la venganza y define el destino del prisionero"	26 April 2022	8.6
8	"El robo de un costoso collar pone en apuros una nueva misión"	27 April 2022	9.4
9	"La vida del coronel José María Montenegro corre grave peligro"	28 April 2022	8.0
10	"Unos amantes mueren a raíz de su engaño"	29 April 2022	7.8
11	"Tras ser capturada, la vida de Leonor Villamizar corre peligro"	2 May 2022	8.6
12	"Se descubre el propósito de la visita del coronel enviado por la Corona"	3 May 2022	9.4
13	"El teniente Montenegro emprende la búsqueda de Leonor Villamizar"	4 May 2022	9.2
14	"Las hermanas Villamizar descubren para quién está dirigido el atentado en el puente"	5 May 2022	10.2
15	"Las hermanas Villamizar encuentran la forma de evitar el atentado contra Bolívar"	6 May 2022	8.4
16	"Las hermanas Villamizar hacen un trato que lleva al coronel del Castillo a la muerte"	9 May 2022	8.8
17	"La misión y la vida del coronel Cuervo están en peligro"	10 May 2022	8.2
18	"Avanza la misión contra Bernat con una gran sorpresa de por medio"	11 May 2022	8.3
19	"Después de cumplir con la misión contra Bernat, Isabela toma una dura decisión"	12 May 2022	8.9
20	"Un invitado del coronel Montenegro trae miedo y preocupación"	13 May 2022	8.2
21	"Las Villamizar crean un plan para liberar a Zenaida"	16 May 2022	9.0
22	"Leonor arruina temporalmente el negocio de la meretriz suprema"	17 May 2022	8.5
23	"La casa de Las Villamizar queda confiscada por las autoridades españolas"	18 May 2022	8.3
24	"El sargento le informa a Montenegro que hay actividades sospechosas en casa de Las Villamizar"	19 May 2022	8.4
25	"Leonor se entera que Manuel golpeó brutalmente a Carolina"	20 May 2022	8.8
26	"Carolina retoma su matrimonio con Albarracín"	23 May 2022	8.9
27	"Los hombres de Jeremías caen en una emboscada liderada por Aurelio"	24 May 2022	8.8
28	"Isabella empieza a acercarse un poco a Salvación"	25 May 2022	9.1
29	"Isabella descubre algo impactante sobre Cuervo"	26 May 2022	8.4
30	"Isabella le pide ayuda a Cuervo para cobrar justicia por la muerte de Beatriz"	27 May 2022	8.4
31	"Leonor es condenada a escarnio en plaza pública y destierro"	31 May 2022	8.0
32	"Isabela se ve obligada a huir y abandonar a Julián"	1 June 2022	8.5
33	"Isabela le informa a Carolina que Julián ha muerto"	2 June 2022	8.9
34	"Leonor decide escapar al monte para unirse a la causa patriota"	3 June 2022	8.2
35	"Federico le propone a Isabela trabajar juntos"	6 June 2022	9.0
36	"Carolina y don Manuel se unen en matrimonio"	7 June 2022	9.1
37	"Isabela regresa al pueblo con una noticia que sorprende a Carolina"	8 June 2022	9.0
38	"La noticia del embarazo de Isabela corre por el pueblo"	9 June 2022	8.9
39	"Montenegro le pregunta a Isabela de quién está embarazada"	10 June 2022	8.2
40	"Federico busca a Isabela en casa de Carolina"	13 June 2022	8.5
41	"Isabela y el hijo en su vientre se encuentran en riesgo"	14 June 2022	9.3
42	"Las Villamizar deben recibir los mapas de las tropas españolas"	15 June 2022	8.2
43	"La misión de Carolina e Isabela no resulta como esperaban"	16 June 2022	8.2
44	"Isabela acude a Federico para librarse de Montenegro"	17 June 2022	8.2
45	"Carolina teme por su vida y planea escapar de Albarracín"	21 June 2022	8.7
46	"Montenegro está decidido a apostar por Carolina"	22 June 2022	8.5
47	"Sor Teresa le encarga una nueva misión a Isabela"	23 June 2022	9.3
48	"Isabela y Federico cumplen la misión encargada por Sor Teresa"	24 June 2022	7.4
49	"Carolina le pide ayuda a Sor Teresa para librarse de Albarracín"	28 June 2022	8.5
50	"Don Manuel Albarracín es trasladado por Sor Teresa y sus monjas"	29 June 2022	7.1
51	"Manuel Albarracín intenta escapar, sin embargo, el fantasma de la muerte lo sigue persiguiendo"	30 June 2022	8.1
52	"Montenegro le informa a Carolina lo que le sucedió a Manuel"	1 July 2022	7.2
53	"Julián Montenegro se reencuentra con su padre"	5 July 2022	8.2
54	"Carolina logra acercarse cada vez más a Montenegro"	6 July 2022	7.9
55	"Leonor es llevada al límite y expuesta a un alto nivel de dolor"	7 July 2022	8.7
56	"Isabela descubre quién es el testigo falso del juicio de Beatriz de Villamizar"	8 July 2022	8.1
57	"Salvación es liberada por órdenes de Montenegro"	11 July 2022	9.7
58	"Montenegro recibe información de un posible infiltrado"	12 July 2022	9.1
59	"El coronel Montenegro se entera de la masacre de los españoles y doña Sofía"	13 July 2022	9.9
60	"Eulalia permanece encerrada donde Sor Teresa"	14 July 2022	9.5
61	"Salvación amenaza a María Luisa y libera a su hermana"	15 July 2022	9.2
62	"Eulalia podría testificar en contra del coronel Montenegro"	18 July 2022	9.1
63	"Orozco le cuenta a Montenegro lo que descubrió sobre Carolina"	19 July 2022	8.7
64	"De La Roche descubre el plan de Isabela"	21 July 2022	7.9
65	"José María Montenegro se entera que Carolina y sus hermanas son espías"	22 July 2022	7.9
66	"Salvación regresa a casa y le cuenta todo lo sucedido a Isabela"	25 July 2022	7.6
67	"Sara logra su objetivo al conocer a uno de los líderes de Carolina"	26 July 2022	8.6
68	"El convento, la vida de Carolina y la misión están en grave peligro"	27 July 2022	8.3
69	"Las Villamizar deciden regresar al Socorro para hacer justicia"	28 July 2022	9.2
70	"Montenegro queda bajo arresto, pero pronto decide qué hacer para liberarse"	29 July 2022	8.9
71	"Isabela da a luz a su hija mientras Montenegro busca a las Villamizar"	1 August 2022	9.7
72	"Las Villamizar se enfrentan en la batalla final contra Montenegro"	2 August 2022	10.3

== Reception ==
=== Ratings ===
Season	Timeslot (COT)	Episodes	First aired		Last aired		Avg. viewers (in points)
Season	Timeslot (COT)	Episodes	Date	Viewers (in points)	Date	Viewers (in points)	Avg. viewers (in points)
1	Mon–Fri 9:30 p.m.	72	18 April 2022	9.6	2 August 2022	10.3	8.7

=== Awards and nominations ===
Year	Award	Category	Nominated	Result	Ref
2022	Produ Awards	Best Superseries	Las Villamizar	Nominated	
2022	Produ Awards	Best Supporting Actress - Superseries or Telenovela	Estefanía Piñeres	Nominated	
2022	Produ Awards	Best Supporting Actress - Superseries or Telenovela	María José Vargas	Nominated	
2022	Produ Awards	Best Directing - Superseries or Telenovela	Mateo Stivelberg and Herney Luna	Nominated	
2022	Produ Awards	Best Fiction Production - Superseries or Telenovela	Juan Carlos Villamizar	Nominated	
2023	India Catalina Awards	Best Art Direction	Diego Guarnizo	Won	
