= Claudio Cataño =

Colombian actor and director (born 1985)

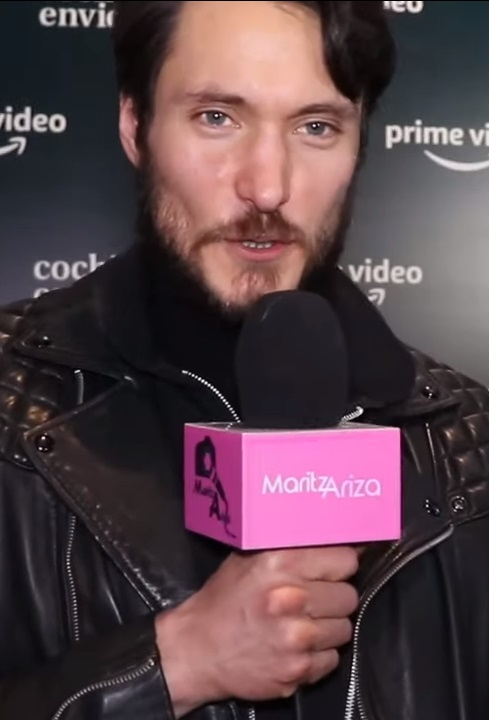
- Cataño in 2022
- Born: Claudio Cataño Porras; 18 September 1985 (age 40); Bogotá, Colombia
- Occupations: Actor; director
- Years active: 2005–present

Claudio Cataño Porras (born 18 September 1985) is a Colombian actor and director. In 2024, he played Colonel Aureliano Buendía in the Netflix television series One Hundred Years of Solitude, based on the 1967 novel of the same name by Gabriel García Márquez.

== Early life ==
Cataño was born in Bogotá to a family of artists. His father, Mauricio Cataño, is a filmmaker. His grandfather, Mario Rivero, was a poet, and his uncle, Fausto Panesso, is a writer. Cataño was raised by his grandparents in La Candelaria. After being expelled from several schools for behavioral issues, he began studying theater at the Escuela Rubén Di Pietro.

== Career ==
Cataño made his television debut on Casados con hijos in 2005. In 2016, he made his feature directorial debut with the film Moria, which he also wrote and executive produced. In 2024, he played Colonel Aureliano Buendía in the Netflix television series One Hundred Years of Solitude, based on Gabriel García Márquez's 1967 novel of the same name.

== Personal life ==
Cataño was in a relationship with Cindy Herazo, with whom he has a son. He later entered into a relationship with Valentina Acosta, which ended in 2010. He has a daughter, Anastasia, with actress Patricia Castañeda. As of May 2023, he is in a relationship with actress María del Rosario.

== Filmography ==
=== Film ===
Year	Title	Role	Notes	Ref.
2016	Moria	—N/a	Director, writer, and executive producer	
2017	Virginia Casta	—N/a	Director, writer, and producer	
2017	Nadie sabe para quién trabaja	Diego Ángel		
2023	Aurora	Adolfo		
2024	Inventario	Borrás		
2024	Horizonte	Basilio		
2024	Dear Gentlemen	Ortiz		
2026	Pacífico	Azul		
2026	The Awakening	TBA		
2026	Susana and Elvira: No Plan B	Gustavo		
TBA	In the Valley of Shadows	TBA		
TBA	La Puta Vida	Jairo		

=== Television ===
Year	Title	Role	Notes	Ref.
2005	Casados con hijos		Episode: "La venganza es dulce"	
2008	La sucursal del cielo	Pedro Lizcano	26 episodes	
2008	Tiempo final		Episode: "Aficionados"	
2008	Muñoz vale x 2	Calixto	3 episodes	
2008	Vecinos	Nardo	129 episodes	
2009	Bermúdez	Diego Medina	Supporting role	
2010	Rosario Tijeras	Sudarzky	2 episodes	
2010–2011	A mano limpia	Manuel Guerra	178 episodes	
2013	5 viudas sueltas	Walter	Supporting role	
2013	Comando élite	David Aguirre	7 episodes	
2015	Tiro de gracia	Esnéider Jaramillo	Supporting role	
2016	La viuda negra	Robert Jones	58 episodes	
2016–2017	2091	Lorent	12 episodes	
2018	María Magdalena	Ur	2 episodes	
2019	El inquisidor	El Gato	6 episodes	
2021	Mil colmillos	Rojas	7 episodes	
2021–2022	La nieta elegida	Sergio Roldán	32 episodes	
2022	Las Villamizar	Aurelio Velásquez	Main role	
2022	Cochina envidia	Samuel	3 episodes	
2024–2026	One Hundred Years of Solitude	Colonel Aureliano Buendía	15 episodes	

== Awards and nominations ==
Award	Year	Category	Nominated work	Result	Ref.
Platino Awards	2025	Best Actor in a Miniseries or TV series	One Hundred Years of Solitude	Won	
Premios India Catalina	2025	Best Leading Actor	One Hundred Years of Solitude	Won	
