= Lady, la vendedora de rosas =

Colombian telenovela

- Genre: Telenovela
- Written by: Lina Arboleda, Juliana Lema, Pedro Miguel Rozo
- Story by: Édgar Domínguez
- Directed by: Israel Sánchez, Juan Felipe Cano
- Starring: Natalia Reyes; Majida Issa; Ernesto Benjumea; Brian Moreno; Yuri Vargas; Viña Machado; Carlos Mariño; Jennifer Arenas
- Theme music composer: Kiño; Osvaldo Montes
- Opening theme: "Una rosa" by Kiño and Osvaldo Montes
- Country of origin: Colombia
- Original language: Spanish
- No. of seasons: 1
- No. of episodes: 78

Production
- Executive producers: Andrea Marulanda, Juan Pablo Posada
- Producer: Marcela Sierra
- Production locations: Medellín; Cartagena; Cannes, France
- Cinematography: Lucas Cristo, Oswaldo Ramírez
- Editor: Jefferson Flórez
- Production company: Sony Pictures Television

Original release
- Network: RCN Televisión
- Release: June 16 – November 17, 2015

Lady, la vendedora de rosas, is a Colombian telenovela produced by Teleset for Sony Pictures Television and RCN Televisión. The telenovela is based on the life of Lady Tabares, during her time as a child and adult.

== Plot ==
Lady, la vendedora de rosas, is a story based on the real life of Lady Tabares, a woman who lives the life straight out of a movie. Lady was raised in one of the poorest and most crime-ridden neighborhoods in Medellín. She grew up sleeping on the streets and begging for a living before she was sent to an orphanage. She eventually left the orphanage after reuniting with her family and in her teens she dedicated herself to selling roses on the streets. By a twist of fate she is chosen to star in the movie La vendedora de rosas, a movie that won many awards in several international festivals, turning her into a star. Unfortunately, the fame that was easy to get was easy to lose, and Lady eventually returned to her old neighborhood to sell roses. The worst then comes when she is sentenced to 26 years in prison for being involved in the death of a man. Lady protested her innocence but was forced to carry out her sentence. While in jail she faced many hardships and struggled for 13 years while maintaining a relationship with her children only via telephone, all the while suffering from an unstable physical and psychological condition.

== Cast ==
- Natalia Reyes as Lady Tabares
- Michell Orozco as Child Lady Tabares
- Majida Issa as Fátima Tabares
- Ernesto Benjumea as Marco García
- Alberto Cardeño as Pacho Rojas
- Patricia Tamayo as Rosalba Jaramillo
- Yuri Vargas as Yurani Bueno Restrepo
- María José Vargas as Yurani
- Fabio Restrepo as Don Elmer
- Víctor Hugo Trespalacios as Adolfo Candamil
- Julián Román as Treinta y Ocho
- Jennifer Arenas as Mireya
- Juan Camilo Pérez as Giovanni Quiñones "el propio"
- Carolina López as Liliana Rojas Jaramillo
- Sara Pinzón as Liliana
- Diego Garzón as Didier Briñez
- Mario Andrés Guerrero as Child Didier Briñez
- Pepe Sánchez as Don Arturo "el Gargamel"
- Rodolfo Silva as Olegario Pérez
- Aura Helena Prada as Hermana Ángela
- Jair Arango Meneses as Chucha
- Andrés Felipe Torres as Fabián Garcés
- Viña Machado as Brigit Restrepo
- Carlos Mariño as Albeiro Bueno
- Juan Pablo Barragán as Arturo "el Mono"
- Alejandro Buitrago as Bartolo
- Orlando Valenzuela as Chumbimba
- María Irene Toro as La Fiscal
- Julieth Restrepo as Sofía Soto
- Maia Landaburu as Norma
- Brian Moreno as Alex Candamil
- Samuel Muños as Alex
