= Platino Award for Best Series Creator =

- Country: Ibero-America
- Presented by: Entidad de Gestión de Derechos de los Productores Audiovisuales (EGEDA), Federación Iberoamericana de Productores Cinematográficos y Audiovisuales (FIPCA)
- Currently held by: Bruno Stagnaro for The Eternaut (2026)
- Website: premiosplatino.com

The Platino Award for Best Series Creator (Spanish: Premio Platino al Mejor creador de miniserie o teleserie) is one of the Platino Awards, Ibero-America's film awards presented annually by the Entidad de Gestión de Derechos de los Productores Audiovisuales (EGEDA) and the Federación Iberoamericana de Productores Cinematográficos y Audiovisuales (FIPCA).

== History ==
It was first introduced in 2021 for the 8th Platino Awards alongside the supporting acting categories in film. Spanish showrunner Aitor Gabilondo was the first recipient of the award for his work in the HBO Europe historical drama Patria.

While no series or showrunner has won the award more than once, Daniel Burman and Álex de la Iglesia are the only showrunners with multiple nominations, with two each. Burman for the series Yosi, the Regretful Spy and Iglesia for 30 Coins.

== Winners and nominees ==
=== 2020s ===
Year	Recipient(s)	English title	Original title	Network
2021 (8th)	(Spain) Aitor Gabilondo	Patria		HBO Europe
2021 (8th)	(Spain) Rodrigo Sorogoyen, Isabel Peña	Riot Police	Antidisturbios	Movistar+
2021 (8th)	(Spain) Álex Pina	Money Heist	La casa de papel	Netflix
2021 (8th)	(Spain) Álex de la Iglesia	30 Coins	30 monedas	HBO Europe
2022 (9th)	(Argentina) Marcelo Piñeyro, Claudia Piñeiro	El reino		Netflix
2022 (9th)	(Spain) Alejandro Amenábar	La Fortuna		Movistar+
2022 (9th)	(Spain) Pepe Coira	Hierro		Movistar+
2022 (9th)	(Argentina) Juan José Campanella	Los enviados		Paramount+
2023 (10th)	(Chile) (Colombia) Andrés Wood, Rodrigo García	News of a Kidnapping	Noticia de un Secuestro	Prime Video
2023 (10th)	(Venezuela) Leonardo Padrón	The Marked Heart	Pálpito	Netflix
2023 (10th)	(Argentina) Daniel Burman	Yosi, the Regretful Spy	Iosi, el espía arrepentido	Prime Video
2023 (10th)	(Argentina) Gastón Duprat, Mariano Cohn	El Encargado		Star+
2024 (11th)	(Argentina) Daniel Burman	Yosi, the Regretful Spy	Iosi, el espía arrepentido	Prime Video
2024 (11th)	(Spain) Álex de la Iglesia	30 Coins	30 monedas	HBO Europe
2024 (11th)	(Argentina) Juan Pablo Kolodziej	El Amor Después del Amor		Netflix
2024 (11th)	(Argentina) Santiago Korovsky	División Palermo		Netflix
2025 (12th)	(Brazil) Vicente Amorim, Fernando Coimbra, Luiz Bolognesi, Patrícia Andrade	Senna		Netflix
2025 (12th)	(Mexico) Curro Royo	Like Water for Chocolate	Como agua para chocolate	HBO
2025 (12th)	(Mexico) Alberto Barrera	El Secreto del Río		Netflix
2025 (12th)	(Colombia) José Rivera, Natalia Santa	One Hundred Years of Solitude	Cien años de soledad	Netflix
2026 (13th)	(Argentina) Bruno Stagnaro	The Eternaut	El eternauta	Netflix
2026 (13th)	(Argentina) Mariano Varela, Ariel Winograd	Menem		Prime Video
2026 (13th)	(Argentina) Rafael Cobos, José Manuel Lorenzo, Fran Araújo, Alberto Rodríguez	The Anatomy of a Moment	Anatomía de un instante	Movistar Plus+
2026 (13th)	(Mexico) Rodrigo Guerrero	Estado de fuga 1986		Netflix
