= Marleyda Soto =

Colombian actress (born 1977)

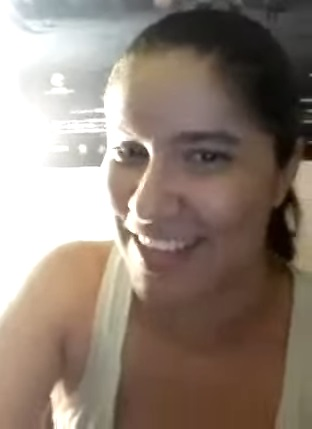
- Soto in 2017
- Born: Marleyda Soto Ríos; 1977 (age 48–49); Vijes, Valle del Cauca, Colombia
- Education: University of Valle
- Occupations: Actress; professor
- Years active: 2008–present

Marleyda Soto Ríos (born 1977) is a Colombian actress and professor. In 2024, she played Úrsula Iguarán in the Netflix television series One Hundred Years of Solitude, based on the 1967 novel of the same name by Gabriel García Márquez.

== Early life ==
Soto was born in Vijes, Valle del Cauca, and grew up in the Aguablanca district of Cali. At the age of 13, she received a scholarship to study acting at the Instituto Departamental de Bellas Artes. She later graduated with a degree in dramatic arts from the University of Valle.

== Career ==
In 2007, Soto made her film debut in Dog Eat Dog. The following year, she starred in Dr. Alemán. In 2015, she played Esperanza in the film Land and Shade. In 2024, she played Úrsula Iguarán in the Netflix television series One Hundred Years of Solitude, based on Gabriel García Márquez's 1967 novel of the same name.

Since 2012, Soto has been a professor at her alma mater, the University of Valle.

== Filmography ==
=== Film ===
Year	Title	Role	Notes	Ref.
2007	Dog Eat Dog	Medina's widow		
2008	Dr. Alemán	Wanda		
2013	Amores peligrosos			
2015	Land and Shade	Esperanza		
2016	Dark Beast	Rocío		
2018	Los silencios	Amparo		
2020	Kairós	Cecilia		
2021	La sombra de tu sonrisa		Short film	
2022	The Pack	Tránsito		

=== Television ===
Year	Title	Role	Notes	Ref.
2023	Ciénaga oscura	Carmiña	3 episodes	
2024	Nosotros los caídos	Rebeca	Miniseries	
2024–present	One Hundred Years of Solitude	Úrsula Iguarán	6 episodes	
2025	Rivers of Fate	Mariangel	4 episodes	

== Awards and nominations ==
Award	Year	Category	Nominated work	Result	Ref.
Guadalajara International Film Festival	2016	Best Actress	Dark Beast	Won	
Havana Film Festival New York	2019	Best Actress	Los silencios	Won	
Platino Awards	2025	Best Actress in a Miniseries or TV series	One Hundred Years of Solitude	Nominated	
