= Los silencios =

2018 film directed by Beatriz Seigner

- Film poster
- Directed by: Beatriz Seigner
- Screenplay by: Beatriz Seigner
- Produced by: Beatriz Seigner; Thierry Lenouvel; Daniel García
- Starring: Marleyda Soto; Enrique Díaz
- Cinematography: Sofía Oggioni
- Edited by: Renata Maria
- Music by: Nascuy Linares
- Production company: Ciné-Sud Promotion
- Release date: 11 May 2018 (Cannes)
- Running time: 88 minutes
- Countries: Brazil; Colombia; France
- Languages: Portuguese; Spanish

Los silencios is a 2018 drama film written, co-produced and directed by Beatriz Seigner. The film explores themes of family, trauma, and the supernatural against the backdrop of conflict in Colombia. It premiered in the Directors' Fortnight section at the 2018 Cannes Film Festival and was later screened at several international film festivals, receiving critical acclaim for its unique storytelling and atmospheric setting.

At the 20th Havana Film Festival New York, protagonist Marleyda Soto was awarded the Havana Star Prize for Best Actress for her role in the film.

== Plot ==
Los Silencios follows the story of Amparo, a Colombian woman who, along with her two children, flees violence in Colombia and arrives on an isolated island on the border between Brazil, Colombia, and Peru. The island, called La Isla de los Silencios, is shrouded in mystery and is inhabited by people who appear to be the living and the dead coexisting peacefully. As Amparo tries to settle her family into their new life, she discovers that the island harbors secrets, and her late husband, who was thought to have died in the conflict, mysteriously appears.

Through supernatural and surreal elements, the film portrays the emotional aftermath of the Colombian conflict, emphasizing the toll that war takes on individuals and families. The borderland setting and the island's ghostly inhabitants serve as metaphors for unresolved grief and trauma.

== Cast ==
- Marleyda Soto as Amparo
- Enrique Díaz as Adão
- Maria Paula Tabares Peña as Nuria
- Adolfo Savinvino as Fabio
