= Vijes =

- Municipality and town

- Flag

- Location of the municipality and town of Vijes in the Valle del Cauca Department of Colombia.

- Location in Colombia
- Coordinates: 03°42′00″N 76°25′00″W
- Country: Colombia
- Department: Valle del Cauca Department
- Region: Andean
- Demonym: Vijeno
- Founded: July 14, 1539

Government
  - Mayor: Caroline Castano

Area
  - Municipality and town: 122 km^{2} (47 sq mi)
- Elevation: 823 m (2,700 ft)

Population (2015)
  - Municipality and town: 11,010
  - Density: 90.25/km^{2} (233.7/sq mi)
  - Urban: 7,112
- Time zone: UTC-5 (Colombia Standard Time)

Vijes is a town and municipality located in the Department of Valle del Cauca, Colombia.

== Notable people ==
- Marleyda Soto (born 1977), actress
