= Alex García López =

Argentine director

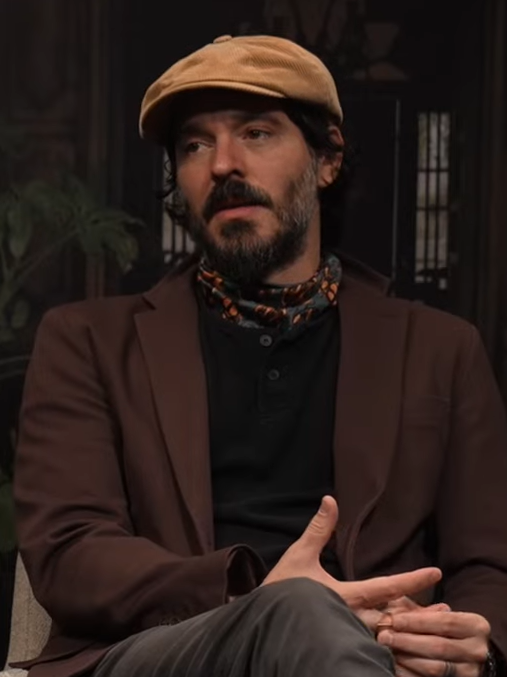
- García López in 2024
- Born: Alejandro García López; Buenos Aires, Argentina
- Education: Berklee College of Music
- Occupations: Director; screenwriter
- Years active: 2008–present

Alejandro "Alex" García López is an Argentine director and screenwriter. He has directed episodes of the television series Fear the Walking Dead (2017), Luke Cage (2018), The Witcher (2019), The Acolyte (2024), and One Hundred Years of Solitude (2024–2026).

== Biography ==
García López was born in Buenos Aires. At the age of 13, he and his family moved to the United States. He studied musical composition at Berklee College of Music and completed a masters degree in the Netherlands. He lived in London for 16 years before moving back to the United States.

He began his career composing music for commercials. In 2009, he co-wrote and directed a short film, Diego's Story, based on the true story of his older brother's kidnapping.

== Filmography ==
=== Film ===
Year	Title	Notes	Ref.
2007	Happy Birthday Granddad	Co-written and directed with Wayne Yip	
2009	Diego's Story	Co-written and directed with Wayne Yip	

=== Television ===
Year	Title	Notes	Ref.
2010	Coming Up	Episode: "Would Like To Meet"	
2011	Secret Diary of a Call Girl	4 episodes	
2011	Misfits	3 episodes	
2013	Utopia	3 episodes	
2015	Residue	3 episodes; also co-executive producer	
2017	Fear the Walking Dead	Episode: "100"	
2017	The Exorcist	Episode: "There But for the Grace of God, Go I"	
2018	Luke Cage	Episode: "They Reminisce Over You"	
2018	Cloak & Dagger	2 episodes	
2018	Daredevil	2 episodes	
2019	The Punisher	Episode: "The Dark Hearts of Men"	
2019	Chilling Adventures of Sabrina	Episode: "Chapter Fifteen: Doctor Cerberus's House of Horror"	
2019–2025	The Witcher	4 episodes	
2021	Cowboy Bebop	5 episodes	
2024	The Acolyte	2 episodes	
2024–2026	One Hundred Years of Solitude	6 episodes	
