= La Cacica =

- Genre: Telenovela
- Directed by: Andrés Marroquín; María Gamboa
- Starring: Viña Machado
- Country of origin: Colombia
- Original language: Spanish
- No. of seasons: 1
- No. of episodes: 40

Production
- Production locations: Mompox Province; Cartagena; Valledupar
- Camera setup: Multi-camera

Original release
- Network: Caracol Televisión
- Release: September 4 – October 30, 2017

La Cacica (stylized onscreen La Cacica, un corazón de leyenda), is a Colombia telenovela that premiered on Venezuelan broadcast television channel Televen on September 4, 2017, and concluded on October 30, 2017. The telenovela is based on the life on the Colombian writer and politics Consuelo Araújo Noguera. It stars Viña Machado as the titular character.

== Plot ==
This is the story of Consuelo Araújo Noguera (Viña Machado), a woman who arrives as a hurricane to revolutionize the serene winds of Valledupar. She takes care that popular music enters unthinkable places, sounds loudly in the Caribbean, extends throughout the entire country and crosses continents. Unfortunately, her life comes to an end after being kidnapped and murdered in the jungle by her captors.

== Cast ==
- Viña Machado as Consuelo Araújo Noguera
- George Coba as Gabriel García Márquez
- Simón Araújo as Young Álvaro Araújo Noguera
- Ismael Barrios as Hernando Molina
- Valeria Henríquez as Young Consuelo Araújo Noguera
- Lucas Buelvas as Naldo Molina
- Iroky Peréz as Pablo López
- Rita Bendeck as Bella Araujo
- Tania Fálquez as Candelaria
- Sebastián Carvajal as Edgardo José Maya Villazón
- Kevin Bury as Young Nando Molina
- Carolina Cuervo as Elena Parodi
- María Laura Quintero as María Lourdes
- Che Carrillo as Rafael Escalona
- Andrés Felipe Martínez as Alfonso López Michelsen
- Laura Barjum as Young La Chechi
- Álvaro Araújo Castro as Álvaro Araújo Noguera
- Diego León García as Young Martín
- Felipe Galofre as Martín
- Sofía Araújo Mejía as Meche Molina
- Rebeca Milanés as La Maye
- Carlos Andrés Villa as Nicolás «Colacho» Mendoz
- Aco Pérez as Jaime Molina
- Simon Araujo as Alvaro Araujo
- Josse Narváez as Félix Socarras
- Raúl Ocampo as Beto Araújo
- Xilena Aicardy as Estrella Socarrás
- Carolina Celedón as Rita Fernández
- Adolfo Sanjuanello as Jesús Araújo
- Éibar Gutiérrez as Alejandro Durán
- Cristina García as Maria Lourdes Socarras
- Eliana Raventos as Chavela Araujo
