= Dark Beast (film) =

2016 film

- Theatrical release poster
- Spanish: Oscuro animal
- Directed by: Felipe Guerrero
- Written by: Felipe Guerrero
- Starring: Marleyda Soto
- Release date: 29 January 2016 (IFFR)
- Running time: 107 minutes
- Countries: Colombia; Argentina; Netherlands; Germany; Greece
- Language: Spanish

Dark Beast (Spanish: Oscuro animal, lit. 'Dark animal') is a 2016 drama film written and directed by Felipe Guerrero. The film was named on the shortlist for Colombia's entry for the Academy Award for Best Foreign Language Film at the 89th Academy Awards, but it was not selected. It is a co-production between Colombia, Argentina, the Netherlands, Germany and Greece.

== Plot ==
Three women must escape from the jungle to the city to get away from the war that plagues the rural territories of Colombia. They arrive in Bogotá to try to restart their lives, in an environment that is completely alien to their reality and customs.

== Cast ==
- Marleyda Soto as Rocío
- Luisa Vides Galiano as Nelsa
- Jocelyn Menendez as La Mona
- Josué Quiñones como Reyes.
