= Viña Machado =

Colombian model and actress (born 1979)

- Viña Machado in 2026
- Born: Virginia María Machado; 17 August 1979 (age 47); Santa Marta, Colombia
- Occupations: Model, actress
- Children: 1

Virginia María Machado is a Colombian model and actress. She has acted in TV series and appeared in music videos.

== Career ==
In her interview with Colombian newspaper El Espectador, she said her first catwalk was at the age of 13. She started her acting career with Dora, and her character "Brigit" in Lady, la vendedora de rosas was important in her acting career after modelling. She had acted in La Cacica and Comando élite. Her performance in TV series La esclava blanca was described as flawless by Publimetro, the Colombian edition of Metro International.

== Personal life ==
El Universal reported that she had lived in Mexico and Italy during her modeling career.

== Filmography ==
Television roles
Year	Title	Roles	Notes
2008	Súper pá	Fernanda Castro	
2009	El fantasma del Gran Hotel	Paola	
2010	El cartel	Joyce	
2011	Correo de inocentes	Inés	
2013	Comando élite	Capitán Anabella Morón	
2014	La Playita	Marysol	
2015	Lady, la vendedora de rosas	Brigit Restrepo	
2015	Anónima	Sofía Linares	
2016	The White Slave	Eugenia Upton	
2017	La Cacica	Consuelo Araújo	Main role; 40 episodes
2018	Undercover Law	Sandra Medina	Main role; 60 episodes
2019	El General Naranjo	Esperanza	Main role (season 1); 14 episodes
2019–2021	Nurses	Gloria Mayorga	Main role (season 1); Main role (season 3)
2024–2026	One Hundred Years of Solitude	Pilar Ternera	Main role
