= List of Guatemalan films =

A list of films produced in Guatemala from the List of Latin American films:

== 1950s ==
Title	Director	Actors	Genre	Notes
El Sombrerón (1950)			Horror	Based on the Guatemalan legend of El Sombrerón.
Caribeña (1953)				
Cuando vuelvas a mí (1953)				
El cristo negro (1955)				
La alegría de vivir (1959)				

== 1960s ==
Title	Director	Actors	Genre	Notes
Pecado (1962)				
Paloma herida (1963)				
Gitana y el charro, La (1964)				
Solo de noche vienes (1966)				
El Hermano Pedro (1967)				
Amor en las nubes (1968)				

== 1970s ==
Title	Director	Actors	Genre	Notes
El Ogro (1971)				
Ssuperzam el invencible (1971)				
El robo de las momias de Guanajuato (1972)			Horror	
Vuelven los campeones justicieros (1972)				
El castillo de las momias de Guanajuato (1973)			Horror	
Mi mesera (1973)				
La Satánica (1973)			Drama	
La mujer del diablo (1974)				
El triunfo de los campeones justicieros (1974)				
El Tuerto Angustias (1974)				
Detrás de esa puerta (1975)				
Sangre derramada (1975)				
Terremoto en Guatemala (1978)				
La muerte también cabalga (1979)			Adventure, Drama	
Penthouse de la muerte (1979)				

== A ==
- Alioto Vive (2003)
- Ambiguity: Crónica de un Sueño Americano (2015)
- A'plas (2009)
- The Apostle (2020 film)
- Aquí me quedo (2010)
- Ave Fénix (1998)

== B ==
- Bienvenidos a Poptún (2006)
- Bodega, La (2009)

== C ==
- Cápsulas (2011)
- Casa de enfrente, La (2003)
- Collect Call (2002)
- Cruces poblado próximo, Las (2006)
- Cuando sea diputado (2005)

== D ==
- De patojo (2011)
- Despedidas, Las (1998)
- Detective por Error de Nito y Neto (2005)
- Días de luz (2019)
- Distancia (2011)
- Donde acaban los caminos (2004)
- Dust (2012)

== E ==
- Estrellas de La Línea (2006)
- Evidencia invisible (2003)
- Exorcismo documentado (2012)

== F ==
- Fe (2011)

== G ==
- Gasolina (2008)
- Gerardi (2010)
- Guatemala: On the Edge of Discovery (2018)

== I ==
- Ixcanul (2015)

== J ==
- José (2018)

== L ==
- La Llorona (2019)

== M ==
- Manzana Guena en noche Guena (2007)
- Marimbas del infierno, Las (2010)
- Misteriosa herencia, La (2004)

== N ==
- El Norte (1983) (filmed in California and Mexico, about Guatemalans)
- Nuestras madres (2019)

== O ==
- Orígenes del silencio, Los (2005)

== P ==
- Pan (2006)
- Permiso a la tierra (2005)
- Pesadilla mortal (1980)
- Puro Mula (2011)

== R ==
- Regreso de Lencho, El (2011)
- Repechaje (2009)
- Retrato de familia: Videocarta (1998)
- Rita (2024)
- Rub' el kurus (Bajo la cruz) (1997)

== S ==
- Saber quién echó fuego ahí (2005)
- Sangre llama, La (2007)
- El Silencio de Neto (1994)
- El silencio del topo (2021)
- Sorge du diable, Le (1991)

== T ==
- Temblores (2019)
- Tierra madre (1996)
- Toque de queda (2011)
- Trip (2011)

== V ==
- Vaca, La (2011)
- Ve que vivos (2006)
- V.I.P. La Otra Casa (2008)
- Viva la crisis (2012)

== W ==
- What Sebastian Dreamt (2003)
