= List of Guatemalan submissions for the Academy Award for Best International Feature Film =

List of Guatemalan films

Best International Feature Film submissions from Guatemala

Highlights
- Debut: 1994
- Submissions: 6
- Nominations: none
- Oscar winners: none

Guatemala submitted a film for the Academy Award for Best International Feature Film (Note: The category was previously named the Academy Award for Best Foreign Language Film, but this was changed to the Academy Award for Best International Feature Film in April 2019, after the Academy deemed the word "Foreign" to be outdated.) for the first time in 1994. The award is handed out annually by the United States Academy of Motion Picture Arts and Sciences to a feature-length motion picture produced outside the United States that contains primarily non-English dialogue. It was not created until the 1956 Academy Awards, in which a competitive Academy Award of Merit, known as the Best Foreign Language Film Award, was created for non-English speaking films, and has been given annually since.

As of 2026, Guatemala has submitted six films, but none of them were nominated.

== Submissions ==
The Academy of Motion Picture Arts and Sciences has invited the film industries of various countries to submit their best film for the Academy Award for Best International Feature Film since 1956. The International Feature Film Committee oversees the process and reviews all the submitted films. Following this, they vote via secret ballot to determine the five nominees for the award.

Most of the submissions are primary in Spanish. Below is a list of the films that have been submitted by Guatemala for review by the academy for the award by year and the respective Academy Awards ceremony.

Year (Ceremony)	Film title used in nomination	Original title	Language(s)	Director	Result
1994 (67th)	The Silence of Neto	El Silencio de Neto	Spanish	Luis Argueta	Not nominated
2015 (88th)	Ixcanul		Kaqchikel, Spanish	Jayro Bustamante	Not nominated
2020 (93rd)	La Llorona		Spanish, Kaqchikel, Ixil	Jayro Bustamante	Made shortlist
2022 (95th)	The Silence of the Mole	El silencio del topo	Spanish	Anäis Taracena	Not nominated
2024 (97th)	Rita		Spanish	Jayro Bustamante	Not nominated
2026 (97th)	Mountains of Fire	Cordillera de Fuego	Spanish	Jayro Bustamante	Pending

== Shortlisted films ==
Year	Film
2020	The Apostle · Luz
2024	Plasticsphere
2026	The Imaginaries

== See also ==
- List of Academy Award winners and nominees for Best International Feature Film
- List of Academy Award–winning foreign-language films
