= Platino Award for Best Film Editing =

- Awarded for: Best Film Editing
- Country: Ibero-America
- Presented by: Entidad de Gestión de Derechos de los Productores Audiovisuales (EGEDA), Federación Iberoamericana de Productores Cinematográficos y Audiovisuales (FIPCA)
- Currently held by: Eduardo Serrano, Matheus Farias for The Secret Agent (2026)
- Website: premiosplatino.com

The Platino Award for Best Film Editing (Spanish: Premio Platino a la mejor dirección de montaje) is one of the Platino Awards, Ibero-America's film awards, presented by the Entidad de Gestión de Derechos de los Productores Audiovisuales (EGEDA) and the Federación Iberoamericana de Productores Cinematográficos y Audiovisuales (FIPCA).

== History ==
The category was first awarded at the second edition of the awards in 2015 with Pablo Barbieri Carrera and Damián Szifron being the first recipients of the award for their work in the Argentine film Wild Tales.

In the list below. the winner of the award for each year is shown first, followed by the other nominees.

== Awards and nominations ==
=== 2010s ===
Year	English title	Original title	Recipient
2015 (2nd)	(Argentina) Wild Tales	Relatos salvajes	Pablo Barbieri Carrera, Damián Szifron
2015 (2nd)	(Spain) Marshland	La isla mínima	José M. G. Moyano
2015 (2nd)	(Cuba) Behavior	Conducta	Pedro Suárez
2015 (2nd)	(Uruguay) Mr. Kaplan		Nacho Ruiz Capillas
2015 (2nd)	(Venezuela) Bad Hair	Pelo malo	Marité Ugas
2016 (3rd)	(Colombia) Embrace of the Serpent	El abrazo de la serpiente	Etienne Boussac
2016 (3rd)	(Guatemala) Ixcanul		César Díaz
2016 (3rd)	(Peru) Magallanes		Eric Williams
2016 (3rd)	(Argentina) The Clan	El Clan	Alejandro Carrillo Penovi, Pablo Trapero
2016 (3rd)	(Spain) Retribution	El desconocido	Jorge Coira
2017 (4th)	(Spain) A Monster Calls	Un monstruo viene a verme	Bernat Vilaplana, Jaume Martí
2017 (4th)	(Spain) May God Save Us	Que Dios nos perdone	Alberto del Campo, Fernando Franco
2017 (4th)	(Venezuela) From Afar	Desde allá	Isabela Monteiro de Castro
2017 (4th)	(Mexico) The Thin Yellow Line	La delgada línea amarilla	Jorge Arturo Garcia
2017 (4th)	(Ecuador) Such Is Life in the Tropics	Sin muertos no hay carnaval	José García
2018 (5th)	(Chile) A Fantastic Woman	Una mujer fantástica	Soledad Salfate
2018 (5th)	(Spain) Summer 1993	Estiu 1993	Ana Pfaff
2018 (5th)	(Colombia) The Animal's Wife	La esposa del animal	Etienne Boussac
2018 (5th)	(Argentina) Zama		Miguel Schverdfinger, Karen Harley
2018 (5th)	(Cuba) Last Days in Havana	Últimos días en La Habana	Rodolfo Barros
2019 (6th)	(Spain) The Realm	El reino	Alberto del Campo
2019 (6th)	(Argentina) El Angel	El Ángel	Guillermo Gatti
2019 (6th)	(Colombia) Birds of Passage	Pájaros de Verano	Miguel Schverdfinger
2019 (6th)	(Mexico) Roma		Alfonso Cuarón, Adam Gough

=== 2020s ===
Year	English title	Original title	Recipient
2020 (7th)	(Spain) Pain and Glory	Dolor y gloria	Teresa Font
2020 (7th)	(Chile) Spider	Araña	Andrea Chignoli
2020 (7th)	(Argentina) Heroic Losers	La odisea de los giles	Alejandro Carrillo Penovi
2020 (7th)	(Spain) The Endless Trench	La trinchera infinita	Laurent Dufreche, Raúl López
2021 (8th)	(Guatemala) La Llorona		Gustavo Matheu, Jayro Bustamante
2021 (8th)	(Colombia) Forgotten We'll Be	El olvido que seremos	Marta Velasco
2021 (8th)	(Spain) Schoolgirls	Las niñas	Sofia Escudé
2021 (8th)	(Mexico) I'm No Longer Here	Ya no estoy aquí	Yibrán Asuad, Fernando Frías de la Parra
2022 (9th)	(Brazil) 7 Prisoners	7 Prisoneiros	Germano de Oliveira
2022 (9th)	(Spain) Maixabel		Nacho Ruiz Capillas
2022 (9th)	(Spain) The Good Boss	El buen patrón	Vanessa Marimbert
2022 (9th)	(Mexico) Los Lobos		Yordi Capó, Carlos Espinoza Benítez, Samuel Kishi
2023 (10th)	(Spain) The Beasts	As bestas	Alberto del Campo
2023 (10th)	Argentina, 1985		Andrés Pepe Estrada
2023 (10th)	(Spain) Prison 77	Modelo 77	José M. G. Moyano
2023 (10th)	(Colombia) The Kings of the World	Los reyes del mundo	Sebastián Hernández, Gustavo Vasco
2024 (11th)	(Spain) Society of the Snow	La sociedad de la nieve	Andrés Gil, Jaume Martí
2024 (11th)	(Mexico) Huesera: The Bone Woman	Huesera	Adriana Martínez
2024 (11th)	(Chile) The Eternal Memory	La memoria infinita	Carolina Siraqyan
2024 (11th)	(Argentina) The Delinquents	Los delincuentes	Manuel Ferrari, Nicolás Goldbart, Rodrigo Moreno
2025 (12th)	(Spain) Undercover	La infiltrada	Victoria Lammers
2025 (12th)	(Mexico) The Echo	El eco	Tatiana Huezo, Lucrecia Gutiérrez
2025 (12th)	(Argentina) Kill the Jockey	El jockey	Rosario Suárez, Yibrán Asuad
2025 (12th)	(Guatemala) Rita		Jayro Bustamante
2026 (13th)	(Brazil) The Secret Agent	O Agente Secreto	Eduardo Serrano, Matheus Farias
2026 (13th)	(Spain) Sundays	Los domingos	Andrés Gil
2026 (13th)	(Spain) Sirāt		Cristóbal Fernández
2026 (13th)	(Colombia) A Poet	Un poeta	Ricardo Saraiva

== See also ==
- Goya Award for Best Editing
