= Culture of Guatemala =

The culture of Guatemala reflects strong Mayan and Spanish influences and continues to be defined as a contrast between poor Mayan villagers in the rural highlands, and the urbanized and relatively wealthy mestizos population (known in Guatemala as ladinos) who occupy the cities and surrounding agricultural agricultural

== Cuisine ==
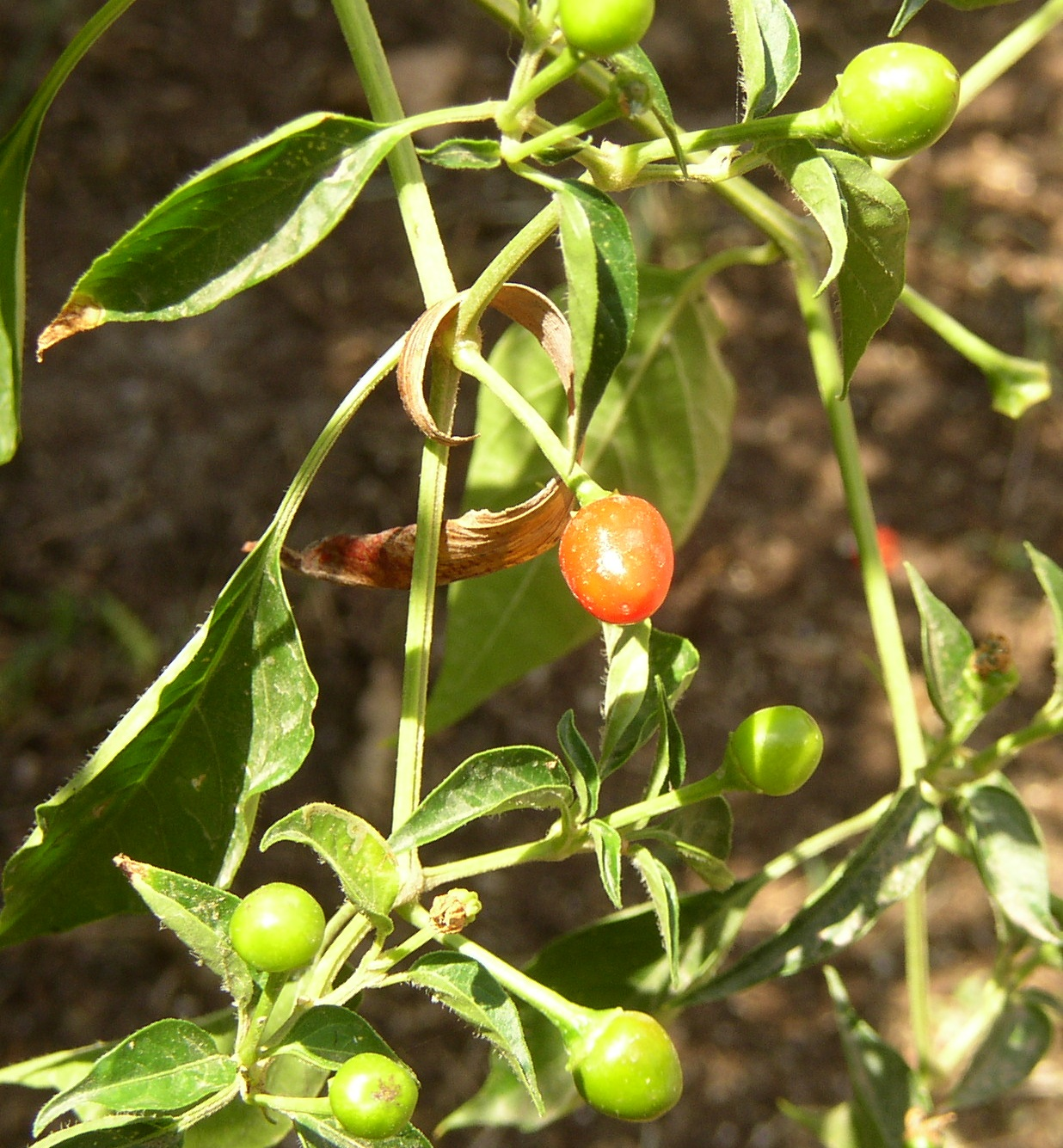
Chiltepe, a common pepper used on some Guatemalan dishes.

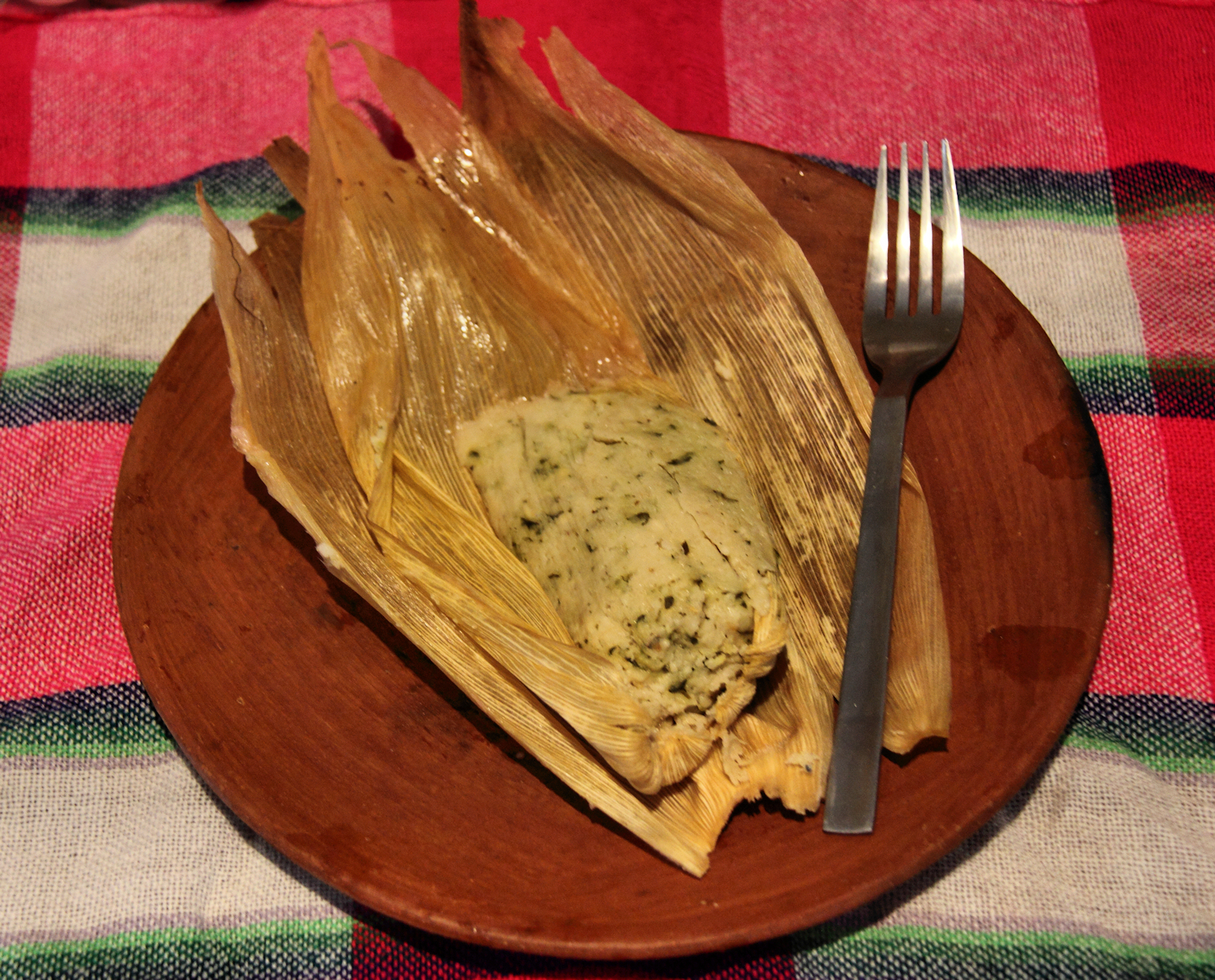
Chipilín Tamal, a common dish usually eaten at dinner.

Guatemalan cuisine makes the multicultural nature of Guatemala, in that it involves food that differs in taste depending on the region. Guatemala has 22 departments (or divisions), each of which has different food varieties. For example, Antigua Guatemala is well known for its candy that makes use of many local ingredients: fruits, seeds and nuts, honey, condensed milk and other traditional sweeteners. Antigua's candy is popular with tourists.

Many traditional foods are based on Maya cuisine and prominently feature corn, chilis and beans. Various dishes may have the same name as dishes from a neighboring country but in fact be quite different. For example the enchilada or quesadilla are nothing like their Mexican counterparts.

There are also foods that it is traditional to eat on certain days of the week - for example, by tradition it is known that on Thursday, the typical food is "paches", which is like a tamale made with a base of potato, and on Sundays it is traditional to eat tamales, because Sundays are considered holidays. Certain dishes are also associated with special occasions, such as fiambre for All Saints Day on November 1 and tamales, which are common for Christmas.

There are reportedly hundreds of varieties of tamales throughout Guatemala. The key variations are what is in the masa or dough (corn, potatoes, rice), what's in the filling (meat, fruits, nuts), and what it is wrapped with (leaves, husks). The masa is made out of corn that is not sweet, such as what is known as feed corn in the United States. In Guatemala, this non-sweet corn is called maize and the corn that Americans from the US are used to eating on the cob, sweet corn, they call elote. Tamales in Guatemala are more typically wrapped in plantain or banana leaves and mashan leaves than corn husks.

The ancient Mayan civilization lasted for about six hundred years before collapsing around 900 A.D. Today, almost half of the Guatemalan population is still Mayan. These natives live throughout the country and grow maize as their staple crop. In addition, the ancient Maya ate amaranth, a breakfast cereal similar to modern day cereals.

== Music ==
Guatemala's national instrument is the marimba, an idiophone from the family of the xylophones, which is played all over the country, even in the remotest corners. Towns also have wind and percussion bands that play during the Lent and Easter-week processions, as well as on other occasions. The Garifuna people of Afro-Caribbean descent, who are spread thinly on the northeastern Caribbean coast, have their own distinct varieties of popular and folk music. Cumbia, from the Colombian variety, is also very popular, especially among the lower classes.

Guatemala also has an almost five-century-old tradition of art music, spanning from the first liturgical chant and polyphony, introduced in 1524 to contemporary art music. Much of the music composed in Guatemala from the 16th century to the 19th century has only recently been unearthed by scholars and is being revived by performers.

== Textiles ==
The Mayan people are known for their brightly colored yarn-based textiles, which are woven into capes, shirts, blouses, and dresses. Each village has its own distinctive pattern, making it possible to distinguish a person's home town on sight. Women's clothing consists of a shirt and a long skirt. Men's clothing consists of a white shirt and colored pants with a jacket. The main source of production of textiles was by the Guatemalan women. Weaving was taught to young girls because of the difficulty of the trade. It would take years for girls to master the process of embroidery. Traditional clothing, mostly worn by indigenous people, was known as "traje" and had a large Mayan influence. The other style was modern and had a western influence, also known as American clothing. Traditional Mayan clothing consisted of hand-embroidered, woven cotton or wool with complex designs. It symbolized the value of heritage and history. Westernized clothing included blue jeans and t-shirts, and symbolized wealth and modernization. Bright colors and unique designs allowed the native people to decipher which town people lived in and their social status. Textiles are largely significant in maintaining the Mayan culture.

== Religion ==
Roman Catholicism combined with the indigenous Maya religion to form the unique syncretic religion which prevailed throughout Guatemala and still does in the rural regions. Beginning from negligible roots prior to the 1960s, Protestant Pentecostalism has grown to become the predominant religion of Guatemala City and other urban centers and down to mid-sized towns.

The unique religion is reflected in the local saint, Maximón, who is associated with the subterranean force of masculine fertility and prostitution. Always depicted in black, he wears a black hat and sits on a chair, often with a bible in one hand, rosary in another, and religious food in his mouth at his feet. The locals know him as San Simon of Guatemala.

== See also ==
- Public holidays in Guatemala
- Holy Week processions in Guatemala
- Media of Guatemala
- List of museums in Guatemala
- Guatemalan folklore
- List of Guatemalan films
- Guatemalan literature
- Mayan Deer Dance
