= María Telón =

Kʼicheʼ Mayan Guatemalan actress (born 1958)

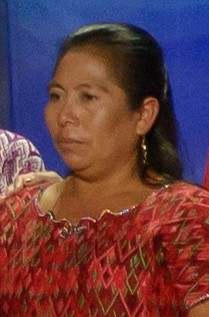
María Telón in 2016

María Telón Soc (born 12 October 1958) is a K'iche' Mayan Guatemalan actress. She made her debut in the film Ixcanul in 2015, receiving the Best Actress award at the Bratislava International Film Festival and other international film festivals.

Telón also appeared in Marvel's Black Panther: Wakanda Forever, playing an elderly Maya woman.

== Career ==
Telón was born on 12 October 1958 and grew up in Santa María de Jesús in a Maya community. She widowed young and had four small children, so she began looking for work as a domestic servant, even though she could neither read nor write. She met the actress Patricia Orantes, who suggested she work in a play in the role of a mother. Meanwhile Telón worked selling fruit at a market.

Through that play, American director Julio Hernández Cordón met Telón and offered her a role in a film, but Telón initially turned it down. However, she eventually agreed to make her film debut in the movie Dust (2012) as Delfina. Success came with her role in the film Ixcanul (2015), where she played Juana. She won the Best Actress award at the Bratislava International Film Festival and accompanied the team to nominations at Berlin International Film Festival and Guadalajara International Film Festival.

She later starred in Temblores (2018), La Justicia, La Llorona and Rita. She made the leap to Hollywood with her minor role in Black Panther: Wakanda Forever. Telón appeared in Israeli soap opera Miguel in 2017.

Telón speaks Spanish, Kaqchikel and Tzʼutujil.

== Filmography ==
=== Films ===
Year	Title	Character	Director	Notes
2015	Ixcanul	Juana	Jayro Bustamante	
2019	La Llorona	Valeriana	Jayro Bustamante	Nominated for the Best Ensemble CinEuphoria
2026	Mountains of Fire	Eugenia	Jayro Bustamante	

== Awards ==
- Lima Film Festival, Best Actress 2015, for Ixcanul
- Mumbai International Film Festival, Best Actress, 2015, for Ixcanul
- Slovakia Film Festival, Best Actress, 2015, for Ixcanul
