= María Mercedes Coroy =

Guatemalan actress (born 1994)

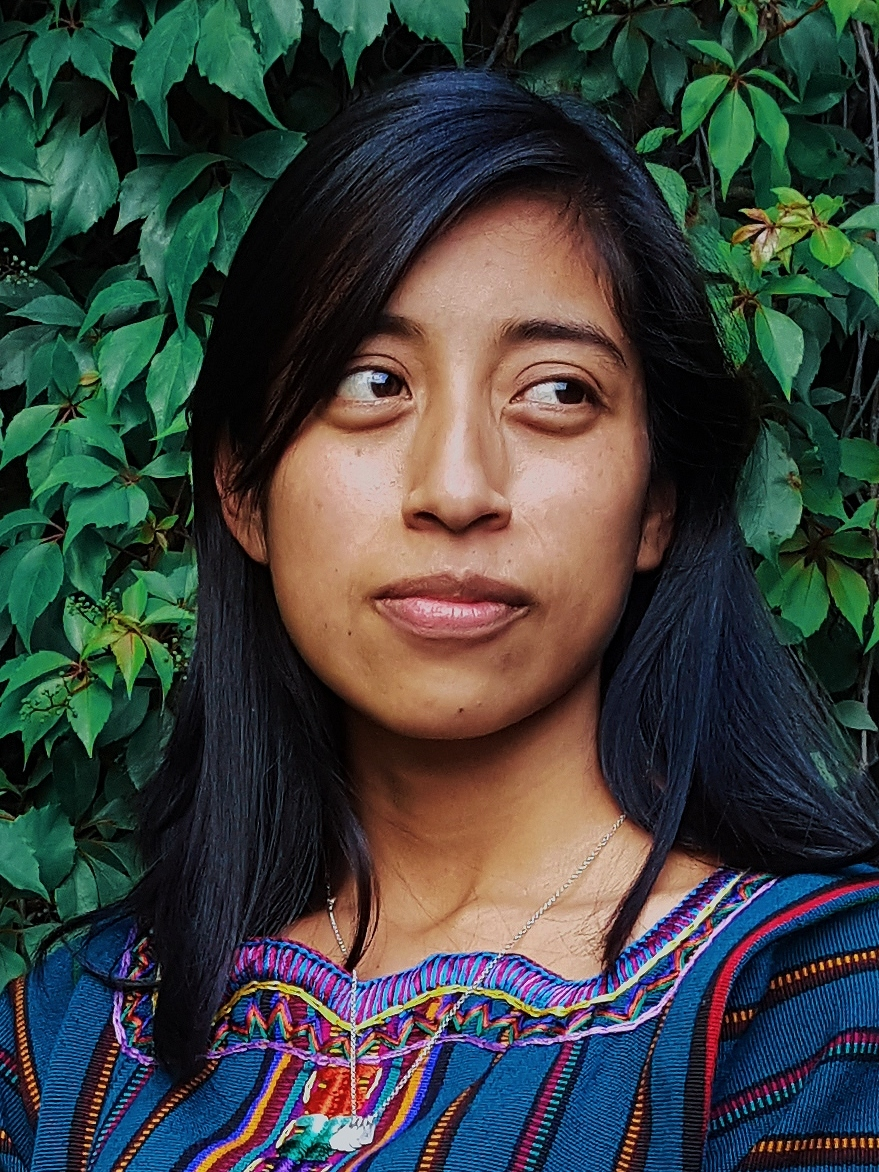
- Coroy in 2021
- Born: September 3, 1994 (age 32); Santa María de Jesús, Guatemala
- Occupation: Actress

María Mercedes Coroy (born September 3, 1994) is a Guatemalan actress of Kaqchikel Maya descent. She is known for her roles in Ixcanul, La Llorona, Bel Canto, Malinche, and Black Panther: Wakanda Forever.

== Early life ==
Coroy was born and raised in Santa María de Jesús, Guatemala in the folds of the Volcán de Agua. Since she was little, she liked to participate in local plays and folk dances, but she was only able to attend school to the fifth grade because she had to help her mother sell fruits and vegetables in the municipality of Palín's market. But, at 17 years old, she resumed her education thanks to Guatemala's National Literacy Program (CONALFA).

She speaks Kaqchikel Mayan as well as Spanish and some Poqomam Mayan.

In 2016, she graduated from University of San Carlos de Guatemala with a degree in acting.

== Career ==
She was discovered via a casting call by Jayro Bustamante, and acted in two of Bustamante's films, Ixcanul and La Llorona.

At the 2019 Venice Film Festival, she wore a typical Quetzaltenango costume.

In 2022, she joined the Marvel Cinematic Universe by appearing in Black Panther: Wakanda Forever where she played Namor's mother.

== Filmography ==
=== Films ===
Year	Title	Character	Director	Notes
2015	Ixcanul	María	Jayro Bustamante	Winner of the Alfred Bauer Silver Bear Award
2018	Bel Canto	Carmen	Paul Weitz	
2019	La Llorona	Alma	Jayro Bustamante	Nominated for the Platino Awards for Best Actress
2022	Black Panther: Wakanda Forever	Princess Fen	Ryan Coogler	
2022	The Pool of the Nobodies	Anayeli	José Luis Solís	Winner - Best Actress at the International Film Festival of Mérida and Yucatán Winner - Best Feature Actress at the Caracas Ibero-American Film Festival
2026	Mountains of Fire	Paula	Jayro Bustamante	

=== Television ===
Year	Title	Character	Director	Notes
2018	Malinche	La Malinche	Patricia Arriaga Jordán	
