= List of Belarusian submissions for the Academy Award for Best International Feature Film =

Best International Feature Film submissions from Belarus

Highlights
- Debut: 1994
- Submissions: 5
- Nominations: none
- Oscar winners: none

Belarus has submitted films for the Academy Award for Best International Feature Film (Note: The category was previously named the Academy Award for Best Foreign Language Film, but this was changed to the Academy Award for Best International Feature Film in April 2019, after the Academy deemed the word "Foreign" to be outdated.) since 1994. The award is handed out annually by the United States Academy of Motion Picture Arts and Sciences to a feature-length motion picture produced outside the United States that contains primarily non-English dialogue. It was not created until the 1956 Academy Awards, in which a competitive Academy Award of Merit, known as the Best Foreign Language Film Award, was created for non-English speaking films, and has been given annually since.

As of 2026, Belarus has submitted five films, but none of them have been nominated.

== Submissions ==
The Academy of Motion Picture Arts and Sciences has invited the film industries of various countries to submit their best film for the Academy Award for Best International Feature Film since 1956. The International Feature Film Committee oversees the process and reviews all the submitted films. Following this, they vote via secret ballot to determine the five nominees for the award.

Before its independence, only one Belarusian film was submitted for the category as the Soviet Union official entry, Come and See (1985) by Elem Klimov, but it was not nominated.

In 1994 and 1996, Belarus selected Jewish-themed films focusing on relations between Polish Jews and Christians before and after World War II. Me Ivan, You Abraham was about the inter-faith friendship between two boys in the 1930s. From Hell to Hell focused on two families – one Jewish, one Christian – and the tragedy that ensues when one family entrusts their child to the other during the war. Neither film was a majority Belarusian production nor was directed by a Belarusian; Zauberman is French and Astrakhan is Russian.

After a 22-year absence from the competition, the country selected Crystal Swan (2018), a comedy-drama about a young woman trying to get a U.S. visa so she can become a DJ in Chicago. It premiered at the 2018 Karlovy Vary International Film Festival.

Persian Lessons (2020), a co-production with Russia and Germany, was selected as the country official entry, however, it was disqualified by the Academy due to the majority of those involved in the production were not from Belarus.

Below is a list of the films that have been submitted by Belarus for review by the academy for the award by year and the respective Academy Awards ceremony.

Year (Ceremony)	Film title used in nomination	Original title	Language(s)	Director	Result
1994 (67th)	Me Ivan, You Abraham	Moi Ivan, toi Abraham	Yiddish, Polish, Belarusian, Russian, Romani	Yolande Zauberman	Not nominated
1996 (69th)	From Hell to Hell	Из ада в ад	German, Russian, Yiddish	Dmitry Astrakhan	Not nominated
2018 (91st)	Crystal Swan	Хрусталь	Russian, English	Darya Zhuk	Not nominated
2019 (92nd)	Debut	Дебют	Russian	Anastasiya Miroshnichenko	Not nominated
2020 (93rd)	Persian Lessons	Persischstunden	English, French, German, Italian, Persian	Vadim Perelman	Disqualified

== See also ==
- List of Academy Award winners and nominees for Best International Feature Film
- List of Academy Award-winning foreign language films

== See also ==
- List of Soviet submissions for the Academy Award for Best International Feature Film
