= I Promise You Anarchy =

2015 film

- Film poster
- Directed by: Julio Hernández Cordón
- Screenplay by: Julio Hernández Cordón
- Produced by: Maximiliano Cruz; Sandra Gómez
- Starring: Diego Calva Hernández; Eduardo Eliseo Martinez
- Cinematography: María José Secco
- Edited by: Lenz Claure
- Music by: Erick Bongcam
- Release date: 9 August 2015 (Locarno)
- Running time: 88 minutes
- Countries: Mexico; Germany
- Language: Spanish

I Promise You Anarchy (Spanish: Te Prometo Anarquía) is a 2015 Mexican drama film, directed and written by Julio Hernández Cordón. The film stars Diego Calva Hernández and Eduardo Eliseo Martinez as two long-time friends and lovers, who are involved in clandestine blood trafficking and encounter a deal with drug lords gone terribly wrong.

The film premiered at the 68th Locarno International Film Festival, being the only Latin film competing for the Golden Leopard Award, and was screened at the Contemporary World Cinema Section of the 2015 Toronto International Film Festival. After its exhibition at the 13th Morelia International Film Festival, the film earned the Guerrero Award for Best Mexican Feature and a Special Mention by the Jury. The film also received two nominations at the 2016 Ariel Awards for Best Director and Best Cinematography.

The film is a love story between two people that addresses the issue of illegal blood trafficking in Mexico, it is a story of crime and strong social criticism.

== Plot ==
Miguel, a middle-class young man living in Mexico City, and Johnny, a glue sniffing skater whose mother is Miguel’s family house maid, have a secret relationship. They work together in illegal blood trafficking deals managed by their associate Gabriel.

The film opens with Miguel and Johnny arguing outside of the latter’s tank truck he lives out of, Johnny accuses Miguel of telling people they are sleeping together. They later have sex in the truck while Johnny’s girlfriend Adri is asleep near them, when Miguel leaves at night, he steals her clothes and throws them off a pedestrian bridge.

Gabriel calls them to organize a quick job in the morning. When together, Gabriel tells Miguel privately that a blood bag turned in by Johnny tested positive for hepatitis C and questions Miguel if he has it as well. Gabriel propositions Miguel about a job that would get him paid well if he recruits 50 people.

Miguel brings up the hepatitis C result to Johnny, questioning who he’s slept with and his distrust of Adri, Johnny shuts him down annoyed. Miguel asks Johnny if he'd be okay dealing with drug traffickers to which he says he doesn't mind. Johnny suggests they could live together at the jai alai court but Miguel turns him down, alluding to their class difference.

Miguel courts 50 people, ranging from very young teens to the elderly, many who are friends and relatives of him and Johnny. David, the guy they will be selling to, intimidates everyone when he arrives with a large truck and armed men. The participants try to back out when they are told they will be transported in the truck to an unknown location but David and his men threaten them, Miguel nervously tries to get them to comply and asks David to wait while he and Johnny get water and snacks to calm them down, however, they come back to an empty lot realizing all the people have just been kidnapped.

Miguel and Johnny skate around the city attempting to hunt down the truck but give up knowing they're long gone. They're unable to contact Gabriel so they show up to his job, when confronted he feigns ignorance and tells them to wait until his work day is over, but Miguel and Johnny sneak back inside the studio and batter him to death.

Miguel and Johnny stay in a hotel room and question what to do with all the money. When Miguel is asleep, Johnny calls his mother, Brenda, to tell her he has enough money for them to be on their own, and sneaks out. Brenda doesn't trust him especially when Johnny doesn't tell her how he came up with the money. They stay at one of Brenda’s friends at an off-road restaurant outside the city, Johnny voices his disliking of the area as there is not space for him to skate, Brenda slaps him and he runs away. Miguel wakes up in a frenzy, calling his mother who tells him Brenda is gone too, she picks him up at the hotel, angry, and drives him to the airport having arranged him to fly off to Texas and work with one of his dad's friends, he doesn't fight it but questions what would happen with Johnny amidst all this.

Miguel feels depressed and alone, and finds solace skating and sniffing glue. The movie ends with Miguel imagining the two of them skating together in Texas.

== Cast ==
- Diego Calva Hernández as Miguel
- Eduardo Eliseo Martinez as Johnny
- Shvasti Calderón as Adri
- Oscar Mario Botello as David
- Gabriel Casanova as Gabriel
- Sarah Minter as Miguel's Mother
- Martha Claudia Moreno as Johnny's Mother
- Diego Escamilla Corona as Techno
- Milkman as David
- Erwin Jonathan Mora Alvarado as Príncipe Azteca
- Juan Pablo Escalante as Nito
- Daniel Adrián Mejía Aguirre as Hamster
- Mario Alberto Sánchez as Major Tom
- Yair Domínguez Monroy as Pedo Bomba
- Francisco Kjeldson as Safari

== Production ==
Diana Sánchez, artistic director of the Panama International Film Festival, stated that the film is "a lovely and heartfelt exploration of love and friendship. Beautifully shot, the film demonstrates Hernández’s versatility and progression as a filmmaker. The scenes of the skateboarders in Mexico City, for instance, are kinetic and feel very realistic”. According to the director, he tried to mix documentary, fiction and film noir, with the film showing "the innocence of youth and the moments you try to play the bad guy, the criminal, but you are not really that kind of character". Te Prometo Anarquía won one part of a split prize at the 2015 Panamá International Film Festival, where it received US$20,000 to pay post production fees; the rest of the prize (US$5,000) was awarded to Costa Rica's El Sonido de las Cosas ("The Sound of Things"), directed by Ariel Escalante.

== Reception ==
The film was named "The Best Mexican Film of 2015" by Fernanda Solórzano of Letras Libres.

== Awards and nominations ==
Award	Category	Nominee	Result
2015 Panamá International Film Festival	Primera Mirada	Te Prometo Anarquía	Won
2015 Locarno International Film Festival	Golden Leopard	Te Prometo Anarquía	Nominated
2015 San Sebastián International Film Festival	Horizons Awards	Te Prometo Anarquía	Nominated
2015 Morelia International Film Festival	Guerrero Award for Best Mexican Feature	Te Prometo Anarquía	Won
2015 Morelia International Film Festival	Special Mention by the Jury	Te Prometo Anarquía	Won
2015 Festival do Rio	FIPRESCI Prize	Te Prometo Anarquía	Won
2015 Havana Film Festival	Coral Award for Best Lead Actor	Diego Calva Hernández	Won
2015 Havana Film Festival	Coral Award for Best Lead Actor	Eduardo Eliseo Martínez	Won
2015 Havana Film Festival	Coral Award for Best Screenplay	Julio Hernández Cordón	Won
58th Ariel Awards	Best Director	Julio Hernández Cordón	Nominated
58th Ariel Awards	Best Cinematography	María José Secco	Nominated
