= List of submissions to the 67th Academy Awards for Best Foreign Language Film =

1994 Best Foreign Language Film submissions
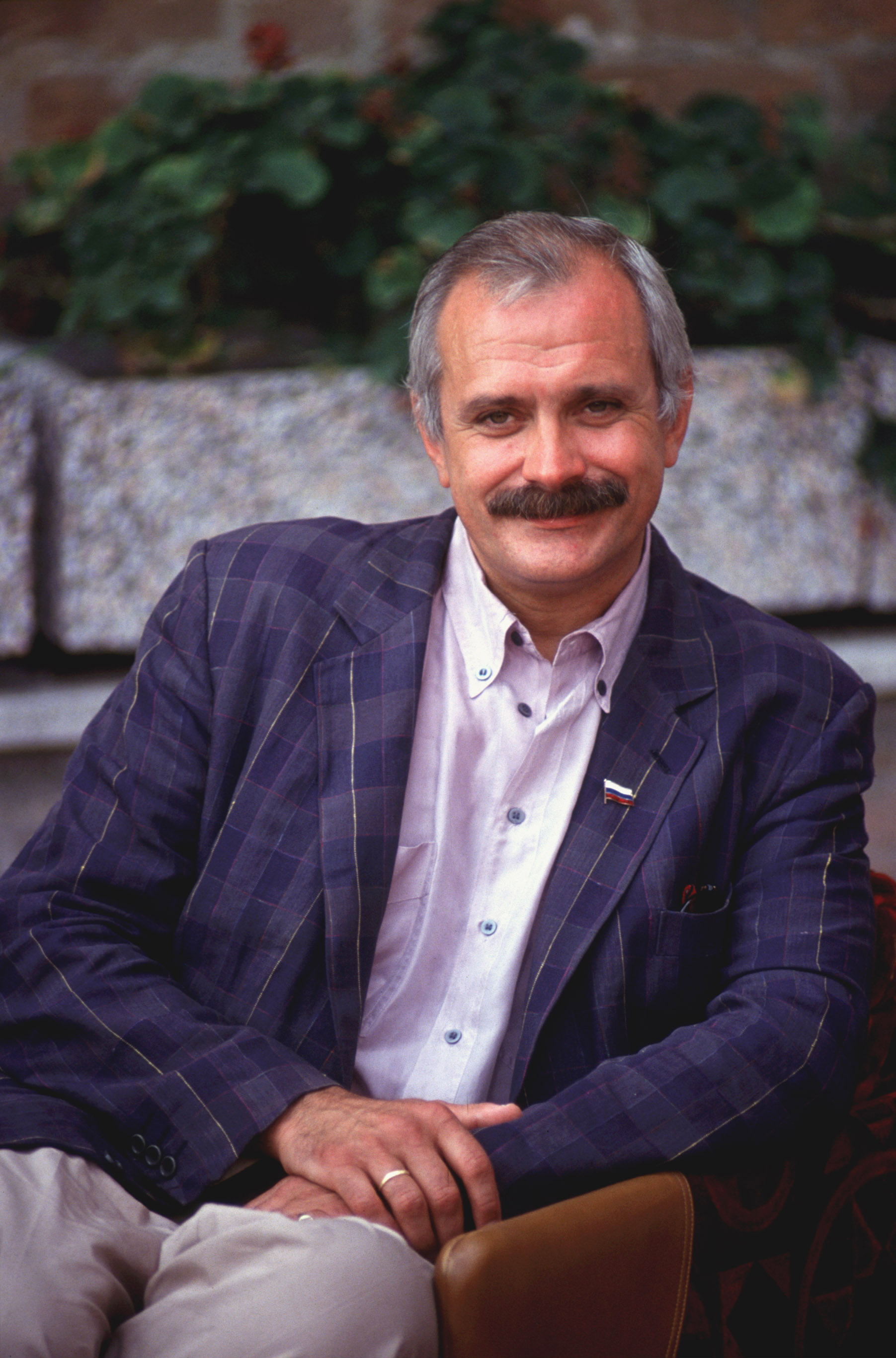
- Nikita Mikhalkov directed Burnt by the Sun, which won the year's award.

Highlights
- Oscar winner: (Russia) Burnt by the Sun
- Submissions: 46
- Debuts: 7
- Total eligible: 45

This is a list of submissions to the 67th Academy Awards for the Best Foreign Language Film. The Academy of Motion Picture Arts and Sciences (AMPAS) has invited the film industries of various countries to submit their best film for the Academy Award for Best Foreign Language Film every year since the award was created in 1956. The award is presented annually by the Academy to a feature-length motion picture produced outside the United States that contains primarily non-English dialogue. The Foreign Language Film Award Committee oversees the process and reviews all the submitted films.

For the 67th Academy Awards, the submitted motion pictures must have first been released theatrically in their respective countries between 1 November 1993 and 31 October 1994. The deadline for submissions to the Academy was 1 November 1994. 46 countries submitted films, and 45 were found to be eligible by AMPAS and screened for voters. Belarus, Bosnia and Herzegovina, Cambodia, the Czech Republic, Guatemala, North Macedonia (as Macedonia), and Serbia (as FR Yugoslavia) submitted films for the first time. The five nominees were announced on 14 February 1995.

Russia won the award for the first time, marking the first win since the dissolution of the Soviet Union, with Burnt by the Sun by Nikita Mikhalkov.

== Submissions ==
| Submitting country | Film title used in nomination | Original title | Language(s) | Director(s) | Result |
|---|---|---|---|---|---|
| Algeria | Autumn: October in Algiers | Automne, octobre à Alger / خريف: أكتوبر بالجزائر العاصمة | French, Arabic | Malik Lakhdar-Hamina | Not nominated |
| Argentina | A Shadow You Soon Will Be | Una sombra ya pronto serás | Spanish, Italian, Latin | Héctor Olivera | Not nominated |
| Austria | I Promise | Ich gelobe | German, Viennese German | Wolfgang Murnberger | Not nominated |
| Belarus | Me Ivan, You Abraham | Moi Ivan, toi Abraham / Я — Іван, ты — Абрам | Yiddish, Polish, Belarusian, Russian, Baltic Romani | Yolande Zauberman | Not nominated |
| Belgium | Farinelli | Farinelli, il castrato | Italian, French | Gérard Corbiau | Nominated |
| Bosnia and Herzegovina | The Awkward Age | Magarece godine | Bosnian | Nenad Dizdarević | Not nominated |
| Cambodia | Rice People | អ្នកស្រែ | Khmer | Rithy Panh | Not nominated |
| Canada | My Friend Max | Mon amie Max | French | Michel Brault | Not nominated |
| Chile | Amnesia | | Spanish | Gonzalo Justiniano | Not nominated |
| Colombia | The Strategy of the Snail | La estrategia del caracol | Spanish | Sergio Cabrera | Not nominated |
| Croatia | Vukovar: The Way Home | Vukovar se vraća kući | Croatian, Serbian | Branko Schmidt | Not nominated |
| Cuba | Strawberry and Chocolate | Fresa y chocolate | Spanish, French | Tomás Gutiérrez Alea and Juan Carlos Tabío | Nominated |
| Czech Republic | Faust | Lekce Faust | Czech, Latin | Jan Švankmajer | Not nominated |
| Denmark | Carl, My Childhood Symphony | Min fynske barndom | Danish | Erik Clausen | Not nominated |
| Egypt | Land of Dreams | أرض الأحلام | Arabic | Daoud Abdel Sayed | Not nominated |
| France | Wild Reeds | Les roseaux sauvages | French | André Téchiné | Not nominated |
| Germany | The Promise | Das Versprechen | German | Margarethe von Trotta | Not nominated |
| Guatemala | The Silence of Neto | El silencio de Neto | Spanish | Luis Argueta | Not nominated |
| Hong Kong | The Day the Sun Turned Cold | 天国逆子 | Mandarin | Yim Ho | Not nominated |
| Hungary | Woyzeck | | Hungarian | János Szász | Not nominated |
| Iceland | Movie Days | Bíódagar | Icelandic | Friðrik Þór Friðriksson | Not nominated |
| India | Bandit Queen | बैन्डिट क्वीन | Bundeli, Hindi | Shekhar Kapur | Not nominated |
| Iran | Through the Olive Trees | زیر درختان زیتون | Persian, Gilaki | Abbas Kiarostami | Not nominated |
| Israel | Sh'Chur | שחור | Hebrew, Judeo-Moroccan Arabic | Shmuel Hasfari | Not nominated |
| Italy | Lamerica | | Italian, Albanian, English | Gianni Amelio | Not nominated |
| Japan | Pom Poko | 平成狸合戦ぽんぽこ | Japanese | Isao Takahata | Not nominated |
| Macedonia | Before the Rain | Пред дождот | Macedonian, Albanian, English | Milcho Manchevski | Nominated |
| Mexico | The Beginning and the End | Principio y fin | Spanish | Arturo Ripstein | Not nominated |
| Netherlands | 1-900 | 06 | Dutch | Theo van Gogh | Not nominated |
| Norway | Cross My Heart and Hope to Die | Ti kniver i hjertet | Norwegian | Marius Holst | Not nominated |
| Peru | Without Compassion | Sin compasión | Spanish | Francisco José Lombardi | Not nominated |
| Poland | Three Colors: White | Trois couleurs: Blanc / Trzy kolory: Biały | Polish, French | Krzysztof Kieślowski | Not nominated |
| Portugal | Three Palm Trees | Três Palmeiras | Portuguese | João Botelho | Not nominated |
| Puerto Rico | Linda Sara | | Spanish | Jacobo Morales | Not nominated |
| Romania | Pepe & Fifi | Pepe și Fifi | Romanian | Dan Pița | Not nominated |
| Russia | Burnt by the Sun | Утомлённые солнцем | Russian, French | Nikita Mikhalkov | Won Academy Award |
| Slovakia | Angel of Mercy | Anjel milosrdenstva / Andel milosrdenství | Czech, Slovak | Miloslav Luther | Not nominated |
| Slovenia | Morana | | Slovene | Aleš Verbič | Not nominated |
| South Korea | Life and Death of the Hollywood Kid | 헐리우드 키드의 생애 | Korean | Chung Ji-young | Not nominated |
| Spain | Cradle Song | Canción de cuna | Spanish | José Luis Garci | Not nominated |
| Sweden | The Last Dance | Sista dansen | Swedish | Colin Nutley | Not nominated |
| Switzerland | Three Colors: Red | Trois Couleurs: Rouge | French | Krzysztof Kieślowski | Disqualified |
| Taiwan | Eat Drink Man Woman | 飲食男女 | Mandarin, Taiwanese Hokkien, Japanese, Cantonese, Shanghainese, Xiang | Ang Lee | Nominated |
| Turkey | Tarzan of Manisa | Manisa Tarzanı | Turkish | Orhan Oğuz | Not nominated |
| Venezuela | Knocks at My Door | Golpes a mi puerta | Spanish | Alejandro Saderman | Not nominated |
| FR Yugoslavia | Vukovar: A Story | Вуковар, једна прича | Serbian, Croatian | Boro Drašković | Not nominated |

== Notes ==
- Switzerland submitted Three Colors: Red by Krzysztof Kieślowski. Kieślowski originally had two films in the race when Poland and Switzerland entered two of his Three Colors trilogy. Switzerland's Red was disqualified in a controversial Academy ruling which determined that although Red was co-produced by the Swiss national film board and although it took place in Switzerland and featured a largely Swiss cast, it qualified as a majority French, and not Swiss, production; meanwhile, Poland's White screened alongside the other films. Miramax Films appealed to the Academy to change its mind, but to no avail; Switzerland declined to send another film. However, it was eligible in other categories and received three nominations: Best Director; Best Cinematography and Best Original Screenplay.
