= Diego Calva =

Mexican actor (born 1992)

- Calva at New York Film Festival 2026
- Born: Diego Calva Hernández; 16 March 1992 (age 34); Mexico City, Mexico
- Occupation: Actor
- Years active: 2015–present

Diego Calva Hernández (born 16 March 1992) is a Mexican actor best known for starring in the crime drama television series Narcos: Mexico (2021) and the black comedy drama film Babylon (2022). For the latter, he received a nomination for the Golden Globe Award for Best Actor - Musical or Comedy.

== Biography ==
Calva was born on 16 March 1992, in Mexico City. He attended the Centro de Capacitación Cinematográfica and studied directing and screenwriting. During his time in film school, he worked as a caterer, set dresser, boom mic operator, and production assistant. He directed a few short films before fully getting into acting.

Calva landed his first lead role in 2015 in the independent film I Promise You Anarchy by filmmaker Julio Hernández Cordón, which premiered at the 68th Locarno International Film Festival and screened at the 2015 Toronto International Film Festival. He won Best Lead Actor with his co-star Eduardo Eliseo Martínez at the 2015 Havana Film Festival for his role in this film. In 2021, he joined the cast of the television series Narcos: Mexico, playing Arturo Beltrán Leyva.

Calva played the role of Manny Torres in Damien Chazelle's 2022 film Babylon, co-starring alongside Brad Pitt and Margot Robbie.

== Filmography ==
=== Film ===
Key
†	Denotes productions that have not yet been released

Year	Title	Role	Notes
2015	I Promise You Anarchy	Miguel	
2022	Babylon	Manuel "Manny" Torres	
2023	City of Dreams	Carlitos	
2023	Bird Box Barcelona	Octavio	
2024	On Swift Horses	Henry	
2026	Her Private Hell	Nico	
2026	Club Kid	Oscar	
2026	Baton		Post-production
2027	Possession		Filming

=== Television ===
Year	Title	Role	Notes
2018	The Inmate	El Rubio	12 episodes
2020	Unstoppable	Joshua	8 episodes
2021	Narcos: Mexico	Arturo Beltrán Leyva	6 episodes
2024	Midnight Family	Marcus	Miniseries; 10 episodes
2024	The Secret of the River	Erik	7 episodes
2025	Prison Cell 211	Juan Olvera	Miniseries; 6 episodes
2026	The Night Manager	Eduardo Vidal / Teddy Dos Santos	Main cast (season 2)

== Awards and nominations ==
Year	Award	Category	Nominated work	Result	Ref.
2015	Havana Film Festival	Best Actor (shared with Eduardo Eliseo Martinez)	I Promise You Anarchy	Won	
2022	Greater Western New York Film Critics Association	Best Lead Actor	Babylon	Nominated	
2023	Golden Globe Awards	Best Actor in a Motion Picture – Musical or Comedy	Babylon	Nominated	
2023	Satellite Awards	Best Actor in a Motion Picture	Babylon	Nominated	
2023	Screen Actors Guild Awards	Outstanding Performance by a Cast in a Motion Picture	Babylon	Nominated	
