= Me Ivan, You Abraham =

- Film poster
- Directed by: Yolande Zauberman
- Written by: Yolande Zauberman
- Starring: Roma Alexandrovitch; Aleksandr Yakovlev; Vladimir Mashkov
- Cinematography: Jean-Marc Fabre
- Release date: 26 May 1993 (France)
- Running time: 105 minutes
- Countries: France, Belarus
- Languages: Yiddish, Belarusian, Polish

Me Ivan, You Abraham (French: Moi Ivan, toi Abraham; Belarusian: Я — Іван, ты — Абрам, romanized: Ya — Ivan, ty — Avram) is a 1993 French-Belarusian film written and directed by Yolande Zauberman. It won the Award of the Youth (French film) at the 1993 Cannes Film Festival and the Golden St. George at the 18th Moscow International Film Festival; and was Belarus' submission for consideration for Best Foreign Film at the 67th Academy Awards. The film was also shown in 1993 at the 9th Warsaw International Film Festival and at the 10th Jerusalem Film Festival.

== Plot ==
In 1930s Poland, Christian boy Ivan goes to live with a Jewish family to learn a trade. He becomes friends with Abraham, the son of the family. However, anti-Semitism is rife in their environment, and they flee to escape an upcoming conflict. Journeying together, they demonstrate their inseparability.

== Cast ==
- Roma Alexandrovitch - Abraham
- Aleksandr Yakovlev - Ivan
- Vladimir Mashkov - Aaron
- Mariya Lipkina - Rachel
- Hélène Lapiower - Reyzele
- Alexander Kalyagin - Mardoche
- Rolan Bykov - Nachman
- Zinovy Gerdt - Zalman
- Daniel Olbrychski - Stepan

== Year-end list ==
- Top 10 (not ranked) – Howie Movshovitz, The Denver Post

== See also ==
- List of submissions to the 67th Academy Awards for Best Foreign Language Film
- List of Belarusian submissions for the Academy Award for Best Foreign Language Film
