= Crystal Swan =

2018 Belarusian drama film

- Film poster
- Directed by: Darya Zhuk
- Written by: Helga Landauer; Darya Zhuk
- Produced by: Valery Dmitrotchenko; Birgit Gernböck; Olga Goister; Debbie Vandermeulen; Will McCance
- Starring: Alina Nasibullina; Ivan Mulin; Yuri Borisov; Svetlana Anikey; Ilya Kapanets; Anastasiya Garvey; Lyudmila Razumova; Natalya Onishenko; Anatoly Golub; Artem Kuren; Vyacheslav Shakalido
- Cinematography: Carolina Costa
- Edited by: Sergey Dmitrenko; Michal Leszczylowski
- Release dates: 1 July 2018 (KVIFF); 30 August 2018 (Belarus)
- Running time: 100 minutes
- Country: Belarus
- Language: Russian
- Box office: $58,702

Crystal Swan (Belarusian: Хрусталь, romanized: Khrustal) is a 2018 Belarusian drama film directed by Darya Zhuk. It was selected as the Belarusian entry for the Best Foreign Language Film at the 91st Academy Awards, but it was not nominated.

== Plot ==
In the 1990s, Velya hopes to leave Belarus and become a DJ in the United States. Her plans change following an error on her visa application.

== Cast ==
- Alina Nasibullina as Velya
- Ivan Mulin as Stepan
- Yuri Borisov as Alik
- Svetlana Anikey as Velya's mother
- Ilya Kapanets as Kostya
- Anastasiya Garvey as Vika
- Lyudmila Razumova as Alya
- Natalya Onishenko as Angela
- Anatoly Golub
- Artem Kuren
- Vyacheslav Shakalido as Mihalych

== Reception ==
Crystal Swan has an approval rating of 100% on review aggregator website Rotten Tomatoes, based on 13 reviews, and an average rating of 7/10. Metacritic assigned the film a weighted average score of 73 out of 100, based on 6 critics, indicating "generally favourable review".

== See also ==
- List of submissions to the 91st Academy Awards for Best Foreign Language Film
- List of Belarusian submissions for the Academy Award for Best Foreign Language Film
