= Buy Me a Gun =

- Film poster
- Directed by: Julio Hernández Cordón
- Screenplay by: Julio Hernández Cordon
- Release date: 14 May 2018 (Cannes)
- Country: Mexico
- Language: Spanish

Buy Me a Gun (Spanish: Cómprame un Revólver) is a 2018 Mexican drama film directed by Julio Hernández Cordón. It was selected to screen in the Directors' Fortnight section at the 2018 Cannes Film Festival.
