= Helga Landauer =

Russian director, writer and poet

- Born: 1969 (age 56–57); Moscow, Russian SFSR, Soviet Union
- Occupations: Director, Writer, Producer and Poet
- Years active: 1996–present

Helga Landauer : Хельга Ольшванг) is a film director, writer and a poet, based in New York City. She is best known for her work on the documentaries A Film About Anna Akhmatova and A Journey of Dmitry Shostakovich and wrote screenplay for Crystal Swan.

== Life and career ==
Landauer was born in 1969 in Moscow, Russian SFSR, Soviet Union. She graduated from Gerasimov Institute of Cinematography. She moved to the United States in 1996 and lives in New York City with her family.

In 1998, Landauer's debut documentary feature, Being Far from Venice, was featured in Anthology Film Archives series and screened at IDFA. A Journey of Dmitry Shostakovich (2006), co-directed with Oksana Dvornichenko, premiered at Carnegie Hall and Louvre Museum in Paris. A Film About Anna Akhmatova (2008), was premiered at the Baryshnikov Arts Center in New York. Her films were featured in many international film festivals, including Mar del Plata International Film Festival and Cinéma du Réel among others. She was a screenwriter for a Belarusian film, Crystal Swan.

== Filmography ==
Year	Title	Writer	Director	Producer	Note
1998	Being Far from Venice	✓	✓		Documentary
2006	A Journey of Dmitry Shostakovich	✓	✓		Documentary, co-director
2008	A Film About Anna Akhmatova		✓		Documentary
2009	Diversions		✓	✓	Documentary
2011	Objects in Mirror are Closer Than They Appear		✓	✓	Feature Film
2015	Arcadia	✓	✓	✓	Documentary
2018	Crystal Swan	✓			Feature Film

2025

William and Fred Feature Film director writer producer

== Books ==
- 96th Book
- The Reed (Тростник) ISBN 5-89803-104-9
- Poetry Works (Стихотворения) ISBN 5-89803-133-2
- Versions of the Present (Версии настоящего) ISBN 978-5-91627-078-5
- The Three (Трое) ISBN 978-1-938781-36-0
- The Blue is White (Голубое это белое) ISBN 978-5-86856-291-4
- Scrolls (Свертки) ISBN 978-5-6040343-8-5
