= Svetlana Anikey =

Belarusian actress

- Born: 7 February 1977 (age 49)
- Occupation: Actress

Svetlana Anikey (Belarusian Svyatlana Uladzimirauna Anikey, born 7 February 1977 in Minsk, Belarusian SSR, USSR) is a Belarusian theater and film actress. She is the actress of the Yanka Kupala National Academic Theatre. Anikey is a recipient of First National Theater Award (2011) and Francysk Skaryna Medal (2020).

== Biography ==
Anikey was born in Minsk, Belarus, on 7 February 1977.

She graduated from the Akhremchik College of Arts, and planned to become an artist. On the first attempt, she got accepted to the theater department of the Belarusian State Academy of Arts to study under the guidance of the famous professor Lydia Alekseevna Monakova.

In 1999, Anikey graduated from the Theater Department of the Belarusian State Academy of Arts. Since 1999, she has been an actress of the Yanka Kupala National Academic Theater. She began acting in films in 2003, making her debut in the film "Hotel ‘Fulfillment of Desires’.“

In 2018, she played one of the leading roles in Radziva Prudok play by Andrus Horvat, which premiered at Yanka Kupala National Academic Theatre and was a great hit with the public. In 2018, she was also in the Crystal Swan movie by Darya Zhuk, the Belarusian entry for the Best Foreign Language Film at the 91st Academy Awards (the Oscars).

In 2020, Anikey played a leading role in Andrei Kureichik's "LIBERTÉ", a philosophical drama featuring Jean-Marc Birkholz and Didier Caness, the Ambassador of France to the Republic of Belarus.

On 26 August 2020, during the protests in Belarus due to the Belarusian Presidential Election falsification and brutal violence against protesters, Anikey resigned from the theater along with 58 actors and supporting staff (the vast majority of the theater's employees). The series of resignations were caused by the firing of the theater's general director, Pavel Latushko, who spoke up against the Lukashenko regime.

On 26 August 2020, after the mass resignation in solidarity with the Belarusian nation, Anikey along with the actors and staff of the Yanka Kupala National Theatre founded the Free Kupalauski Theater, which continues the long-standing traditions of the national theater, including broadcasting their work for free on their YouTube channel, Kupalaucy. The statement after the resignation was the following: "We have left our home, but we are sure we will come back to it. Our page is about our return, our long way back home."

Besides acting, Anikey restores unique Belarusian wooden furniture from the remote villages.

== Films ==
- Hotel "Fulfillment of Desires" (2003; debut)
- Eric XIV (film-play; 2004) - Karin, the daughter of Mons
- Death Sculptor (2007)
- Panther (2007)
- Your Honor (2007) - Veronica
- Challenge-3 (2008)
- Challenge-4 (2009) - Alexandra Sergeevna Deryugina
- Semin (2009) - Yulia Kostrikova
- The collapse of the favorite (2009) - Tanya
- Detective Agency "Ivan da Marya" (2009) - Viola
- Quiet Center (2010) - Aliya
- Quiet Pool (2010) - Svetlana
- Mortal Combat (2010) - Drozdov's girlfriend
- Heart to Heart (2010)
- Revenge (2010) - Vasily's wife
- Captain Gordeev (2010) - Nadezhda Konstantinovna, the teacher of the murdered girl
- Divination by candlelight (2010)
- Talash (2011) - Taisiya
- Family detective (2011) - Natalya Lapina, accountant
- Novel in Letters (2011) - Dean's Secretary
- Kiss of Socrates (2011) - Inessa Smolova, Leakey's friend
- Navigator (2011) - Tatyana Arkadyevna, Olya's mother
- Once upon a time Love (2011) - Diana, nurse
- White Wolves (2012–2013) - Cecile Noiret, human rights activist
- The heart is not a stone (2012) - Eugene, wife of Nikolai
- The Hunt for the Gauleiter (2012)
- Hotel for Cinderella (2012) - Tamara, a lady in a fur coat
- Don't Go (2012) - Lida, Nurse
- Mother and Stepmother (2012) - Veronica
- Immediately after the creation of the world (2013) - Lyuba
- Save or Destroy (2013) - translator
- Stepsister (2013) - Arina
- Oh, ma-piss! (2013) - Lyudmila Viktorovna Krylovich, teacher
- On purpose you can't imagine (2013) - Nadia, sister of Yuri
- We swear to protect (2013) - lead teacher
- Leaving Nature (2014) - Assistant Director
- The dream is like life (2014) - a market woman
- A good name (2014) - Julia Sysoeva
- Doctor (2014) - Galina Alexandrovna, Svetlana's friend
- Instead of her (2014) - Natasha, Nastya's mother
- The Far Side of the Moon 2 (2015) - Olga, Sorokin's daughter
- New World (Nowy Świat; 2015) - Irina, "Jeanne" short story
- Incorruptible (2015) - Lyudmila Istomina, Kulikov's secretary
- Star Trap (2015) - Marina, a head waiter
- Housekeeper (2015) - Nina, Olga's friend
- Payback for happiness (2016) - Alina, Ilya's deputy
- I Hate (2016) - Albina Sokolova
- Love out of competition (2016) - Larisa Ivanovna, nanny candidate
- Insidious games (2016) - Lyudmila, entrepreneur
- All Ages of Love (2016) - Jeanne
- Black Blood (2017) - Svetlana
- Swing (2017) - Laura, Garay's wife
- Crystal Swan (2018) - Velya's mother
- The Elusive Life (2018) - Irina Mitina, Notary
- A hole in the head (2018)
- Kryostnaya (2019)
- Lake of Happiness (2019)
- Liberte (2020) by Andrei Kureichik - leading role

== Awards ==
- First National Theater Award for Best Actress (2011)
- Top Actor's Award, XV All-Polish Festival of Contemporary Drama "Rzeczywistość przedstawiona" (for the role in the production of A. Korytkowska-Mazur "Sonka", Białystok Drama Theater, 2015)
- Francysk Skaryna Medal (National Award) (2020)

== Bibliography ==
- Svetlana Anikey
- Stage actress can’t imagine using acting in her ‘real’ life
- Art magazine (founded by the Ministry of Culture) : Actress who dreams to play "Oblomov"
- Channel Belarus 24: From Minsk to a village: a leading actress talks about non-random accidents and creative experiments
- Nasha Niva: Leading actress will play a glamorous enchantress
- Sovetskaya Belorussiya - Belarus Segodnya : Actress with an accent
- IMDb Svetlana Anikey
- Svetlana Anikey
- Шоу ПОДЪЕМ! Светлана Аникей. Смбат Тоноян
- Светлана Аникей: «Если бы я хотела вернуться в Пинск, то в качестве мэра города»
