= Malinche (TV series) =

Mexican 2018 series

- Genre: Drama
- Created by: Patricia Arriaga Jordán
- Written by: Javier Peñalosa; Monika Revilla
- Directed by: Julián de Tavira
- Starring: María Mercedes Coroy; José María de Tavira; Luis Arrieta
- Country of origin: Mexico
- Original languages: Spanish; Nahuatl; Mayan
- No. of seasons: 1
- No. of episodes: 5

Original release
- Network: Canal Once
- Release: 10 November – 8 December 2018

Malinche is a Mexican TV series about the life of La Malinche, the indigenous translator who accompanied Hernán Cortés during his conquest of the Aztec capital Tenochtitlan. The series is spoken in native languages and the colors of the subtitles indicate which one: white is for Nahuatl, yellow is for Mayan, blue is for Popoluca, green is for Totonaca and pink is for Latin. The series first aired in 2018 on the Mexican cultural channel Canal Once.

== Plot ==
In 1519, Malinche is a slave to the Mayans in Tabasco. When the Mayans lose a battle to the newly arrived Spaniards, they give women to them as a tribute of war. Even though Malinche is not picked as one of these women, she sneaks into the group. She hopes slavery under the Spaniards is better than under the Mayans. During the expedition to Tenochtitlan, Malinche notices that the Spaniards are having a tough time communicating with the locals so she offers her services as a translator. She speaks both Nahuatl and Mayan, which completes the language skills of the other translator Jerónimo de Aguilar who speaks Spanish and Mayan. Malinche becomes very important in the negotiations with the different tribes. She tries to use this newly acquired and relative power to negotiate her freedom, so she can finally go back to her hometown.

== Cast ==
- María Mercedes Coroy as Malinche
- José María de Tavira as Hernán Cortés
- Luis Arrieta as Jerónimo de Aguilar
- Alberto Barahona as Pedro de Alvarado
- Jesús García Ra as Moctezuma
- Josué Maychi as Cuauhtemoc

== Episodes ==
No.	Title	Directed by	Teleplay by	Original release date
1	"Mauhcatiliztli (Fear)"	Julián de Tavira	Patricia Arriaga Jordán	November 10, 2018
2	"Tecpillahtolli (Noble word)"	Israel Pasco	Monika Revilla	November 17, 2018
3	"Tlahtoani (The one who speaks)"	Israel Pasco	Javier Peñalosa	November 24, 2018
4	"Cáhuitl (That which is leaving us)"	Israel Pasco, Julia Rivero	Monika Revilla	December 1, 2018
5	"Noconeuh (Roots)"	Julián de Tavira	Javier Peñalosa	December 8, 2018
