= Rita (2024 Guatemalan film) =

- Theatrical release poster
- Directed by: Jayro Bustamante
- Written by: Jayro Bustamante
- Produced by: Jayro Bustamante; Jonathan King; Gustavo Matheu
- Starring: Giuliana Santa Cruz
- Cinematography: Inti Briones
- Edited by: Jayro Bustamante; Gustavo Matheu
- Music by: Pascual Reyes
- Production companies: Concordia Studio; La Casa de Producción
- Distributed by: Shudder (United States)
- Release dates: July 25, 2024 (Fantasia); August 8, 2024 (Guatemala)
- Running time: 107 minutes
- Countries: Guatemala; United States
- Language: Spanish

Rita is a 2024 dark fantasy horror film written, co-produced, co-edited and directed by Jayro Bustamante. It stars Giuliana Santa Cruz as a 13-year-old girl who, fleeing from her abusive father, is trapped in an institution managed by the state from whence she plans to escape with her cellmates in a violent act.

The film is inspired by the 2017 tragedy.

It is the first feature co-produced between Guatemala and the United States. Rita had its world premiere at the 28th Fantasia International Film Festival on 25 July 2024, where it won the best Cinematography Award.

It was selected as the Guatemalan entry in the Best International Feature Film at the 97th Academy Awards.

== Synopsis ==
A 13-year-old girl named Rita manages to escape from her abusive father. She is taken in by a kind owner of a diner, where she finds solace for a time, until she is transferred to a state-run institution that is full of fantastic beings, super-powered girls who plan to destroy the witches and demons that rule the place and are waiting for her to carry out their escape plan.

== Cast ==
- Giuliana Santa Cruz as Rita
- Glendy Asturias Rucal as Gladys
- Ángela Joana Quevedo as Sulmi
- Alejandra Vásquez Carrillo as Bebé
- André Sebastián Aldana as "La Terca"
- Ernesto Molina Samperio as William
- María Telón as Celia
- Sabrina De La Hoz as Monitora
- Margarita Kenéfic as Ernestina
- Juan Pablo Olyslager as Police chief
- Guie Cuyun as Police officer

== Production ==
Principal photography took place in the middle of the COVID-19 pandemic, lasting 3 months in Guatemala.

== Release ==
It had its world premiere on July 25, 2024, at the 28th Fantasia International Film Festival, then screened on September 25, 2024, at the 25th Calgary International Film Festival, and on October 5, 2024, at the 43rd Vancouver International Film Festival.

It was commercially released on August 8, 2024, in Guatemalan theaters, then was released on November 22, 2024, on Shudder.

== Accolades ==
Year	Award / Festival	Category	Recipient	Result	Ref.
2024	28th Fantasia International Film Festival	Cheval Noir - Best Film	Rita	Nominated	
2024	28th Fantasia International Film Festival	Best Cinematography	Inti Briones	Won	
2025	12th Platino Awards	Best Screenplay	Jayro Bustamante	Nominated	
2025	12th Platino Awards	Best Cinematography	Inti Briones	Nominated	
2025	12th Platino Awards	Best Film Editing	Jayro Bustamante	Nominated	
2025	67th Ariel Awards	Best Ibero-American Film	Rita	Nominated	

== See also ==
- List of submissions to the 97th Academy Awards for Best International Feature Film
- List of Guatemalan submissions for the Academy Award for Best International Feature Film
