= Debut (film) =

2017 film

- Film poster
- Directed by: Anastasiya Miroshnichenko
- Written by: Elena Antonishina
- Produced by: Viktor Lobkovich
- Cinematography: Alexandr Moroz
- Edited by: Varfalamey Kuraga
- Release date: 2017 (IDFA)
- Running time: 80 minutes
- Country: Belarus
- Language: Russian

Debut is a 2017 Belarusian documentary film directed by Anastasiya Miroshnichenko. It was selected as the Belarusian entry for the Best International Feature Film at the 92nd Academy Awards, but it was not nominated.

== Premise ==
Eleven female convicts in a Belarusian prison participate in a theater play.

== See also ==
- List of submissions to the 92nd Academy Awards for Best International Feature Film
- List of Belarusian submissions for the Academy Award for Best International Feature Film
