= The Pool of the Nobodies =

- Film poster
- Directed by: José Luis Solís Olivares
- Written by: José Luis Solís Olivares
- Produced by: Damián Cano Ruiz; Hugo Espinosa; Brenda Hinojosa; Laura Berrón
- Starring: María Mercedes Coroy; Alex Bautista
- Cinematography: Alejandro Cantú
- Edited by: Gilberto González Penilla
- Music by: Rodrigo Mier y Arce
- Production company: Kerosen Producciones
- Release date: December 4, 2022 (Ícaro)
- Running time: 81 minutes
- Country: Mexico
- Languages: Spanish; Nahuatl; Zapotec; Kaqchikel

The Pool of the Nobodies (Spanish: La alberca de los nadies) is a 2022 Mexican drama film written and directed by José Luis Solís Olivares. Starring María Mercedes Coroy & Alex Bautista. It won Best Feature Film, Best Feature Director, Best Feature Actress for María Mercedes Coroy and Best Feature Actor for Alex Bautista at the 2023 Caracas Ibero-American Film Festival.

== Synopsis ==
An indigenous migrant named Alex is put to the ultimate test, forced into the criminal underworld just to live another day. Anayeli, another indigenous migrant, fights to save the life of her unborn child, as well as her own. Both will do unthinkable things to survive.

== Cast ==
The actors participating in this film are:

- María Mercedes Coroy as Anayeli
- Alex Bautista as Alex
- Manuel Domínguez
- Antonio Trejo Sánchez
- Katzir Meza
- Carlos Gueta
- David Colorado
- Bety Mancia
- Verónica Andrés Jesús

== Production ==
Principal photography began in November 2021 in Garcia, Nuevo León, Mexico amid the COVID-19 pandemic.

== Release ==
The Pool of the Nobodies had its international premiere on December 4, 2022, at the 25th Ícaro Festival, Guatemala.

== Accolades ==
Year	Award / Festival	Category	Recipient	Result	Ref.
2022	International Film Festival of Mérida and Yucatán	Best Actress	María Mercedes Coroy	Won	
2022	Fabrique Du Cinéma Awards	Best International Feature Film	The Pool of the Nobodies	Won	
2022	Mannheim Arts and Film Festival	Best Human Rights Feature Film	The Pool of the Nobodies	Won	
2022	Barcelona Planet Film Festival	Best Narrative Feature Film	The Pool of the Nobodies	Won	
2023	Caracas Ibero-American Film Festival	Best Feature Film	The Pool of the Nobodies	Won	
2023	Caracas Ibero-American Film Festival	Best Feature Director	The Pool of the Nobodies	Won	
2023	Caracas Ibero-American Film Festival	Best Feature Actress	María Mercedes Coroy	Won	
2023	Caracas Ibero-American Film Festival	Best Feature Actor	Alex Bautista	Won	
