= Darya Zhuk =

- Born: April 26, 1980 (age 45); Minsk
- Occupations: Film director, playwright
- Notable work: Crystal Swan

Darya Zhuk is an independent film director and playwright of Belarusian origin. She was born in Minsk in 1980, at the age of 16 she left to the USA where she studied economics at Harvard and started her career as a business analyst at HBO. She became interested in filmmaking and in 2014 graduated with honors from Columbia MFA in Directing. Zhuk's credits as director and playwright include detective drama Zato for Netflix, Russian Affairs for Amazon Europe, Little America for Apple TV+, and many more. As an independent director, she won such prestigious grants as New York State Council for the Arts, Panavision Emerging Filmmaker grant, and Interdisciplinary Council for the Art of Columbia University.

In 2018, she released her feature debut Crystal Swan, a story about a young DJ girl who hopes to get an American visa and go to the USA. At the post-production stage, the movie won the Best International Works in Progress award at PÖFF film festival in Tallinn as well as several prizes at international film festivals. Crystal Swan was selected as the Belarusian entry for the Best Foreign Language Film at the 91st Oscars, but was not nominated.

In 2023, Zhuk presented her We Haven’t Met Until This Summer at the 23rd edition of the east–west co-production market at German Film Festival Cottbus. The project is produced by Ewa Puszczynska.

Zhuk is one of the founders of the Belarusian Film Academy (BIFA).

Zhuk's upcoming project is titled Exactly What It Seems and is described as a dystopian science fiction drama. The film is produced by Belarus-born, Estonia-based producer Volia Chajkouskaya.

As of 2024, she is an Adjunct Assistant Professor at Columbia University School of the Arts. As of 2025 she is not included in Columbia's School of the Arts's directory.

== Awards ==
- 2015 — Best female writer-director award – New York Women in Film and Television;
- Best Female Director by Adrienne Shelly Foundation (nomination);
- Special jury prize for her short The Real American at Listapad Film Festival in Minsk;

== Filmography ==
- Half-Life (2011, short)
- The Air Inside Her (2011, short)
- Eat the Tourists (2014, short)
- The Real American (2015, short)
- Crystal Swan (2018)
- Gold Diggers TV series (2020, 2 season)
- The Premise TV series (2021, episode 4)
