= Dust (2012 film) =

2012 film

- Film poster
- Directed by: Julio Hernández Cordón
- Written by: Julio Hernández Cordón; Mateo Iribarren
- Produced by: Fernanda del Nido; Julio Hernández Cordón; Pamela Guinea; Juan de Dios Larraín; Pablo Larraín; Paulo de Carvalho; Gudula Meinzolt
- Starring: Fernando Martínez
- Cinematography: María Secco
- Edited by: Aina Calleja
- Release date: 9 August 2012 (Locarno)
- Running time: 80 minutes
- Country: Guatemala
- Language: Spanish

Dust (Spanish: Polvo) is a 2012 Guatemalan drama film directed by Julio Hernández Cordón about a family disrupted by past government violence. The film was shown at international film festivals but was not widely released in theaters. It received mixed reviews.

== Synopsis ==
The film follows Delfina and Juan, a traumatized mother and son whose husband and father was a victim of Guatemalan government repression, as they become the subjects of a documentary made by couple Ignacio and Alejandra. Eventually, it is revealed that Juan and Delfina's neighbor, the target of harassment from Juan throughout the movie, is responsible for his father's disappearance.

== Cast ==
- Alejandra Estrada as Alejandra
- Fernando Martínez as Juan and Delfina's neighbor
- Agustin Ortíz Pérez as Juan
- Eduardo Spiegeler as Ignacio
- María Telón Soc as Delfina

== Reception ==
Dust made its world premiere at the 65th Locarno Film Festival in 2012. It was also shown at the 2012 Toronto International Film Festival. The film won the grand prize of the 2013 Cinélatino (fr:Cinélatino) Film Festival in Toulouse.

Dan Fainaru, writing for Screen International, called the film "unnecessarily complicated and confusing" in its jumping between the various plot threads. Jay Weissberg, writing for Variety, called the film "a compilation of tenuously connected scenes" which "hold zero emotional weight;" comparing the film unfavorably to Cordón's earlier Marimbas From Hell, Weissberg noted that funding from sponsors like World Cinema Fund and Ibermedia would at least guarantee the film a worldwide festival tour.

More favorably, Diana Sanchez (programmer for the Toronto International Film Festival) described the film as a "moving drama" which "attests to how cinema can contribute, however modestly, to a country's long and arduous process of healing." Aarón Lacayo examined the film's "ecochronicity," exploring how the dust of the film's title pervades the narrative as it disrupts the production of the documentary, exacerbates Ignacio's allergies, and afflicts Juan with migraines and insomnia.
