= Gasolina (film) =

- Directed by: Julio Hernández Cordón
- Written by: Julio Guatehernández
- Produced by: Donald Ranvaud; Silvio Sardi; Pablo Valladares
- Starring: José Andres Chamier; Carlos Dardon; Francisco Jacome
- Cinematography: María Secco
- Edited by: Aina Calleja
- Distributed by: Interior13 Cine
- Release date: 13 August 2008 (Locarno Film Festival)
- Running time: 71 minutes
- Country: Guatemala
- Language: Spanish
- Budget: $10,000

Gasolina (Gasoline) is a 2008 Guatemalan independent film written and directed by Julio Hernández Cordón. The film deals with dehumanization, lack of purpose and recklessness in Guatemalan youthfulness by following the exploits of three teenage boys who go out on a midnight joyride outside their housing project, stealing gasoline from other vehicles along the way. It stars José Andrés Chamier, Carlos Dardón and Francisco Jacome.

== Plot ==
The film tells a story of three middle-class teenagers on a high-octane ride to hell outside the safety of their colonia. They siphon gasoline from their neighbors cars and roam the streets, looking for any and every form of entertainment, but they soon learn that even the simplest actions can have consequences way beyond anything they imagined, and some lessons are learned too late.

== Accolades ==
- Winner: Films in Progress Award, San Sebastián International Film Festival 2007
- Winner: Horizontes Award, San Sebastián International Film Festival 2008
