= The Silence of the Mole =

El silencio del topo
- Theatrical release poster
- Directed by: Anaïs Taracena
- Produced by: Rafael González; Anaïs Taracena
- Cinematography: Carla Molina
- Edited by: Pedro G. García
- Production companies: Asombro Producciones; Colet & Co. Ek Balam Producciones
- Release dates: April 2021 (Canada); June 2, 2022 (Guatemala); February 10, 2023 (Mexico)
- Running time: 92 minutes
- Country: Guatemala
- Language: Spanish

The Silence of the Mole (Spanish: El silencio del topo) is a 2021 Guatemalan documentary film directed by Anaïs Taracena. It tells the story of the journalist Elías Barahona, better known as The Mole, who between 1976 and 1980 was infiltrated as press secretary of the Guatemalan Ministry of the Interior. It was selected as the Guatemalan entry in the Best International Feature Film at the 95th Academy Awards, but was not nominated.

== Synopsis ==
Throughout the 1970s, journalist Elías Barahona, alias El Topo (The Mole), infiltrated the heart of one of Guatemala's most repressive governments. By revealing the story of this reserved and unique individual, The Silence of the Mole captures the moments when revelations from the past open cracks in the walls of silence of a story that remains hidden.

== Release ==
The film had its world premiere at the end of April 2021 at the Hot Docs Canadian International Documentary Festival 2021 in Toronto, Canada. The film was released commercially on 2 June 2022, in Guatemalan theaters. It had a limited release on 10 February 2023, in Mexican theaters.

== Accolades ==
Year	Award	Category	Recipient	Result	Ref.
2021	Hot Docs Canadian International Documentary Festival	Best Documentary	The Silence of the Mole	Nominated	
2021	Sheffield International Documentary Festival	Tim Hetherington Award	Anaïs Taracena	Won	
2021	Sheffield International Documentary Festival	Youth Jury Award	Anaïs Taracena	Nominated	
2021	Dokufest International Documentary and Short Film Festival	Truth Award	The Silence of the Mole	Nominated	
2021	Dokufest International Documentary and Short Film Festival	Special Mention – Truth Award	The Silence of the Mole	Won	
2021	International Documentary Film Festival of Mexico City	Best Documentary	The Silence of the Mole	Won	
2022	New Creators Film Awards	Best International Documentary	The Silence of the Mole	Won	
2022	LASA Film Festival	LASA Award of Merit in Film	The Silence of the Mole	Won	
2022	Cine Las Americas International Film Festival	Best Documentary Feature	The Silence of the Mole	Won	
2022	Acampadoc 2022	Best International Documentary	The Silence of the Mole	Won	
2022	Latin American Eye Sucre International Human Rights Festival	Pukanawi Award	The Silence of the Mole	Won	
2022	Majordocs Festival	Audience Awards	The Silence of the Mole	Won	
2022	Jeonju International Film Festival	Special Jury Prize	The Silence of the Mole	Won	
2022	Málaga Spanish Film Festival	Best Documentary	The Silence of the Mole	Won	
2022	Macondo Awards	Best Ibero-American Feature Film	The Silence of the Mole	Won	
2022	Atlantidoc	Best First Feature	The Silence of the Mole	Won	
2022	Ibero-Latin American Film Festival of Yale	Best Documentary	The Silence of the Mole	Won	
2022	Rosario Latin American Film Festival	Human Rights Award	The Silence of the Mole	Won	
2022	Trieste Ibero-Latin American Film Festival	Special Mention	The Silence of the Mole	Won	
2022	La Plata Latin American Film Festival	Special Mention	The Silence of the Mole	Won	
2022	LatinUy Film Festival	Best Documentary	The Silence of the Mole	Won	
2022	Icarus Festival	Best Central American Documentary Feature Film	The Silence of the Mole	Won	
2022	International Festival of the New Latin American Cinema of Havana	Special Choral Award of the Documentary Feature Jury	The Silence of the Mole	Won	
2022	Geneva Film Festival and Human Rights Forum	Gilda Vieira de Mello	The Silence of the Mole	Won	
2022	Izmir International Documentary Festival	Best Documentary Film	The Silence of the Mole	Won	
2023	Platino Awards	Best Documentary	The Silence of the Mole	Nominated	

== See also ==
- List of submissions to the 95th Academy Awards for Best International Feature Film
- List of Guatemalan submissions for the Academy Award for Best International Feature Film
