= The Apostle (2020 film) =

El apostolado
- Film poster
- Directed by: Juan Manuel Mendez
- Written by: Juan Manuel Mendez
- Produced by: Juan Manuel Mendez
- Starring: Sebastián de la Hoz; Andrea Gálvez; Devayani Morales
- Cinematography: Juan Brenner; Pablo Valladares
- Edited by: Domingo Lemus; Juan Manuel Mendez
- Music by: Luis Pedro González
- Production company: Vizconde Producciones
- Release date: September 18, 2020
- Running time: 89 minutes
- Country: Guatemala
- Language: Spanish

The Apostle (Spanish: El apostolado) is a 2020 Guatemalan drama film written, directed and produced by Juan Manuel Méndez in his directorial debut. The film was shortlisted by the Guatemalan Association of Audiovisual and Cinematography along with La Llorona and Luz to represent Guatemala in the category of Best International Feature Film at the 93rd Academy Award, but was not chosen. But it was chosen to represent Guatemala in the category of Best Ibero-American Film at the 36th Goya Awards, however, it was not nominated.

== Synopsis ==
In a city where corruption, abuse and violence are our daily bread, a priest spends his days listening to people who search for the relief of telling their problems in exchange for a hot meal. Everything will change when he'll meet two women that will make his search to take another turn.

== Cast ==
- Sebastián de la Hoz as The priest
- Andrea Gálvez as Inés
- Devayani Morales as Esmeralda
- Luis Barrillas as Eliseo
- Humberto Rodríguez as Chente
- Rodrigo Maegli Mendez as Jefferson
- Lucía Montepeque as Julieta
- Juan Pensamiento as The Shepherd
- Mynor Sacarías as "El Seco"

== Idealization ==
Mendel at the beginning had great ambitions for the project, trying to carry it out in France, however, it was a very difficult challenge due to financing issues, so Méndez thought it would be more viable to make a smaller film, quoting his words: "I needed to record something that was achievable and above all affordable. I had the idea of this character who liked to help people and among everything that made me more logical I had the image of this priest".

== Release ==
El apostolado had planned a commercial release in theaters in Guatemala in 2020, but it was canceled due to the COVID-19 pandemic. Later, it was announced that the film will have a digital release on Vimeo on Demand between September 18, 2020, and 25 of the same month.

== Reception ==
El Periodico stated that the film was about "people who change", in particular in the case of priests in regard to their relation with women. An article in La Hora recalls the difficulties encountered during the production of the film and insists the story could be about any priest in Guatemala or anywhere in Latin America. The Diario de Centro América concurs it is a film about good and evil, and faith and ethics but states the film contains various typically Guatemalan elements.
