= Mayan Deer Dance =

Traditional Guatemalan dance

The Guatemalan Traditional Mayan Deer Dance, also known as "Baile de Venado" in Spanish, is a traditional dance performed by the indigenous Mayan people of Guatemala. The dance is often performed during important cultural and religious celebrations and ceremonies, accompanied by traditional music played on instruments such as marimbas, maracas, drums, and flutes.

== History and significance ==
The origins of the Mayan Deer Dance can be traced back to pre-Columbian times, when the deer was a symbol of power and nobility among the Maya people. The dance is believed to have been originally performed as a hunting ritual and was intended to honor the spirits of the animals that were hunted for food.

Over time, the Mayan Deer Dance became an important part of Mayan culture and tradition, performed during religious ceremonies and other important events. The dance is seen as a way to connect with the spirits of the natural world and to pay homage to the ancestors and deities of Mayan mythology.

== Costume and performance ==
Performance of Mayan Deer Dance in Cobán, Guatemala

The costume worn by the performers of the Mayan Deer Dance is an important element of the dance, and is designed to represent the deer, which is a sacred animal in Mayan culture. The headpiece worn by the performer is often the most elaborate part of the costume. It is designed to resemble the head of a deer and is typically made from a combination of materials such as leather, fur, and cloth. The headpiece may feature antlers made from branches or other natural materials, and is often decorated with feathers and beads.

The rest of the costume typically consists of a tunic or shirt made from a lightweight, breathable fabric such as cotton or linen. The tunic may be decorated with intricate embroidery or other decorative elements, such as colorful patterns or images of animals. The performer may also wear a belt or sash around their waist, which is often decorated with bells or other jingling ornaments that make noise as the dancer moves.

In addition to the tunic, performers may also wear pants or leggings made from a similar lightweight fabric. These pants are typically loose-fitting and allow the performer to move freely while dancing. The pants may also be decorated with embroidery or other decorative elements.

The footwear worn by performers of the Mayan Deer Dance is typically simple and functional. They may wear sandals or lightweight shoes that allow them to move easily on the dance floor or other surfaces.

The dance itself is a ritualistic performance, with dancers moving in a stylized manner that mimics the movements of deer. The dance is often performed in groups, with each dancer representing a different aspect of the natural world, such as the sun, moon, or stars. The dance is accompanied by traditional music played on instruments such as maracas, drums, and flutes.

== Modern interpretations ==
Today, the Mayan Deer Dance continues to be an important part of Mayan culture and tradition, and is performed at festivals, religious ceremonies, and other important events. In recent years, the dance has also been incorporated into modern art and performance, with contemporary artists using the dance as a way to explore themes of identity, tradition, and spirituality.

One such artist is Angelica Chinchilla, a Guatemalan-American artist who has created a series of multimedia installations inspired by the Mayan Deer Dance. Chinchilla's work explores the ways in which traditional Mayan culture intersects with contemporary life and seeks to challenge stereotypes and misconceptions about indigenous peoples and their cultures. Chinchilla's installations incorporate elements of performance, sculpture, and video, and seek to create a dialogue between traditional and contemporary forms of artistic expression.

Another example of modern interpretations of the Mayan Deer Dance is the work of the Guatemalan artist, Carlos Mérida. Mérida was a prominent figure in the Mexican muralist movement of the early 20th century and was known for his colorful and dynamic depictions of Mayan culture and tradition. One of his most famous works, the mural "The Magic World of the Mayas," depicts scenes from the Mayan Deer Dance, as well as other traditional Mayan rituals and ceremonies.
