= The Silence of Neto =

1994 film

- Directed by: Luis Argueta
- Written by: Luis Argueta
- Starring: Óscar Javier Almengor
- Release date: 1994
- Running time: 106 minutes
- Country: Guatemala
- Language: Spanish

The Silence of Neto (Spanish: El silencio de Neto) is a 1994 Guatemalan drama film directed by Luis Argueta. The film was selected as the Guatemalan entry for the Best Foreign Language Film at the 67th Academy Awards, but was not accepted as a nominee. It was the first time Guatemala had sent a film.

== Cast ==
- Óscar Javier Almengor as Neto Yepes
- Herbert Meneses as Ernesto Yepes
- Julio Diaz as Eduardo Yepes

== See also ==
- List of submissions to the 67th Academy Awards for Best Foreign Language Film
- List of Guatemalan submissions for the Academy Award for Best Foreign Language Film
