= Sarah Minter =

Mexican filmmaker and artist

Sarah Minter (born 1953 in Puebla, Mexico, died 2016) was a Mexican filmmaker and artist.

== Career ==
Minter produced 8mm and 16mm films, video installations, and documentaries that displayed intersections of the body, politics, and the city. Her first contact with video was when she filmed Super 8. Her artworks display the evolution of video and express themes of intimacy, marginalization, and different perceptions. She studied cinematography at the National Autonomous University of Mexico film school in Mexico City. Minter's career began in the 1970s when she joined the experimental group Ergónico. While she was a part of this group, she was able to have her first contact with video and developed a strong liking for it. The medium was affordable and unrestricted in terms of structure, which is something that she enjoyed. Minter used this to her advantage, creating works that express her own ideas and thoughts despite the male dominance of the genre and the rejection that the genre received. In the late 1990s, Minter worked as a teacher, curator, and promoter of video. She was one of the founders of the video workshop at the Escuela Nacional de Pintura, Escultura y Grabado "La Esmeralda" in Mexico City and worked as a professor there. She also taught video at Casa del Lago and at the Universidad Iberoamericana. In 2002, she spoke about the lack of recognition that Mexican video received. She died in 2016.

== Awards ==
- Rockefeller Foundation Intercultural Film and Video fellowship (1992)
- Grant from Fondo Nacional para la Cultura y las Artes (1994)
- González Camarena Award at the 1st Festival Videofilme, Mexico
- Coral award at the 9th International Festival of New Latin American Film, Havana, Cuba
- Pitirri Prize at the 5th International Film and Video Festival of San Juan, Puerto Rico
- Rulfo Award at the 1st Festival Videofilme of Guadalajara, Jalisco
- Best Documentary Made by a Woman at the 8th Morelia International Film Festival
- Zanate Award at the 4th Documentary Film and Video Festival Zanate, Colima
- Best Mexican Documentary at the 2nd International Film Festival of Puebla (FIC Puebla)
- Special Mention at the 6th Independent Hispanic American Film and Video Festival, “All Voices Against the Silence,” in Mexico City

== Artworks ==
=== Hablame de Amor (Talk to me about Love, 2009) ===
This is a video installation that shows conversations between people at a dinner table. Minter asked the participants to talk about love and intimacy and the issues that may arise from it from a personal perspective. The idea is to show how love is expressed in a specific community. The participants were people who were close to Minter, and most of them were involved in arts and humanities. There was no restrictions in terms of gender or race. When displayed, viewers are only able to hear the conversations if they are close to the installation, further allowing for a more intimate experience.

=== Nadie es inocente (No one is innocent, 1985–87) ===
This film shows tells a story of a group of young people living in a punk experience. It shows how these people expressed their punk lifestyles, intending to shine light on the marginalized state that they live in. The film crushes stereotypes that are inflicted upon those who identify as punk and shows viewers the lives of these people from a personal perspective. Minter came in contact with the individuals 20 years later and a made a film (Nadie es inocente- 20 años después) that shows the lives of these individuals and the careers they were able to pursue, further showing that punk individuals are capable of pursuing more than society says.

=== Alma punk (Punk soul, 1992) ===
This film is a narrative about a girl named Alma who lives in Mexico City. She comes into contact with punk, Mexican rock, and the ideals of living abroad. It displays the ideas of punk, rebellion, economic instability, and weak political regime. It also displays the perspective of a teenager trying to express herself.

=== Intervalos (Intervals, 2004) ===
This piece is made up of 18 video installations that show scenes of intimacy between other people and including herself. It expresses bodily sensations and urban observations. This work allowed Minter to express herself and show herself in different perspectives. Every scene shows who she is and what she sees, although she is not physically present in all of them.

== Exhibitions ==
- 1990 Mexican Video, Bronx Museum of the Arts, New York
- 1994 Third Bienal de Video, Mexico City
- 1997 Femme totale: Sixth International Women's Film Festival, Dortmund, Germany
- 1997 Mexican Video: Thorn of the Mountain, Museum of Modern Art, New York
- 1999 Vid@arte: Festival de video y artes electrónicas, Centro Nacional de las Artes, Mexico City
- 2015 Eye in Rotation: Sarah Minter. Images in motion 1981, Mexico City

== Publications ==
- Ojo en Rotación : Imágenes en Movimiento 1981-2015 (Rotating Eye : Images in Motion 1981-2015)
