= Julio Hernández Cordón =

American documentary filmmaker

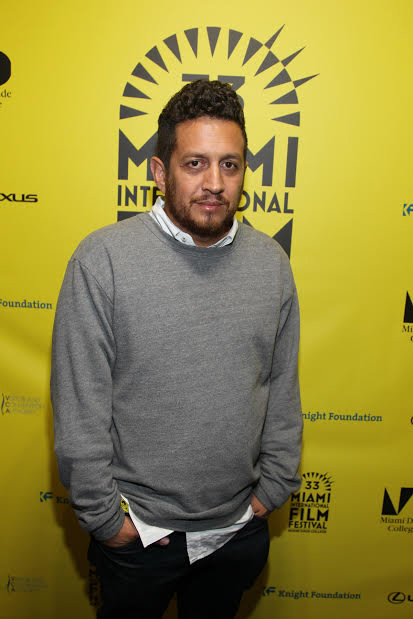
- Hernández Cordón at the Miami Film Festival presentation of I Promise You Anarchy
- Born: Julio Hernández Cordón; January 17, 1975 (age 51); Raleigh, North Carolina, U.S.
- Education: Rafael Landívar University
- Occupations: Director, producer, screenwriter
- Years active: 2003–present
- Spouse: Pamela Guinea
- Children: 3

Julio Hernández Cordón (born January 17, 1975) is an American director, producer and screenwriter. An active filmmaker since 2003, Hernández Cordón has been involved in six films, including shorts and documentaries. Hernández Cordón attained critical acclaim for directing the Gasolina (2008), Polvo (2012) and Te Prometo Anarquía (2015).

Hernández Cordón has worked with non-professional actors on his documentary-style narrative films, for which he has been awarded at several international film festivals, including Locarno, Morelia, Toronto and San Sebastián. In 2016, he received nominations for Best Director at the 58th and 62nd Ariel Awards in Mexico for his work in the films Te Prometo Anarquía and Cómprame Un Revólver.

== Early life and background ==
Hernández Cordón was born in Raleigh, North Carolina, United States to a Mexican father and a Guatemalan mother, while his father was studying a doctorate in international trade there. Hernández Cordón was subsequently registered at the Mexican and Guatemalan embassies in Washington and raised between Mexico, Guatemala and Costa Rica. He has American, Guatemalan and Mexican passports. In his youth, he worked in a record store and afterwards as a reporter for the newspaper El Periodico in Guatemala, where he covered news and the cultural sections. During his tenure in the newspaper, Hernández Cordón also published the story book Por El Suelo (2000), which he later repented. He joined the Guatemalan Rafael Landívar University to study Communication Sciences and Journalism, and after that he studied filmmaking at the Centro de Capacitación Cinematográfica in Mexico.

== Film career ==
In 2003 Hernández Cordón directed the short film Km 31 and five years later, Gasolina (2008), his first feature film, premiered. The film, about three teenagers who steal gasoline to go out at night and drive around in their mom's car, won the Industry, Casa de América and CICAE Awards at the San Sebastián International Film Festival. While reviewing the film, Variety stated that the director "prominently displays his pitifully scarce resources in the guise of minimalism". His second film, was the documentary Las Marimbas del Infierno (2010), about Don Alfonso, a marimbero extorted by the mara, and Blacko, a doctor who plays rock music, with the common goal of merging the traditional sound of the marimba with heavy metal music. About shooting the film in Guatemala, the director said: "It is a small country with no cinema law or institute and therefore no state support and virtually films are produced with individual initiatives. The directors make their films and produced them with the support of friends, with professional cameras but not film cameras, and the country's context make us do "guerrilla" style films, with low budget and solving certain shortcomings creatively, but these shortcomings provide a certain style to the movies we are doing. That does not mean it is poor cinema, is minimalist, maybe". The film won the Guerrero Award for Best Mexican Feature at the Morelia International Film Festival and the Grand Prix at the Rencontres Cinémas d’Amérique Latine de Toulouse.

Polvo (2012), about a couple of documentary filmmakers with the task of telling the story of women who are still searching for their missing husbands or parents during the long civil war that devastated Guatemala between 1960 and 1996, was nominated for the Golden Leopard Awards at the Locarno International Film Festival. The same year, Hasta el Sol Tiene Manchas was released. According to Hernández Cordón, the film was a "playful and experimental, and meets the criteria of low-budget films", because having limited budget gives to the filmmaker "creative freedom". It shows two characters: a boy with intellectual disability that promotes the vote for a presidential candidate, promising them that if they vote for him, the country would qualify for their first World Cup, and a graffiti artist showing his discontent, and the film had intentionally "super crappy and flat performances", since was a critique of the socio-political frustrations in Guatemala. Te Prometo Anarquía had its premiere in 2015 at the 68th Locarno International Film Festival, where it was the only Latin film competing for the Golden Leopard Award and was also screened at the Contemporary World Cinema Section of the 2015 Toronto International Film Festival. After its exhibition at the 13th Morelia International Film Festival, the film earned the Guerrero Award for Best Mexican Feature and a Special Mention by the Jury. Te Prometo Anarquía, stars Diego Calva Hernández and Eduardo Eliseo Martinez as two long-time friends and lovers, and after a failed business are separated by the mother of one of them, and for this work, Hernández Cordón earned a nomination for Best Director at the 58th Ariel Awards in Mexico. Hernández Cordón has advocated for a very personal kind of filmmaking, usually using non-professional actors, often neighbors from his local community. About his approach for the film, the director stated:

"My intention was to play a little with the film noir genre, grab it, using elements closest to my filmography, mixing documentary and fictional elements, the use of non-professional actors and a very naturalistic atmosphere. I usually shoot without a script, but with this film I intended to be more attached to the text. I did not do it totally. I was won by the actors vitality. Many scenes and dialogues arose at the time. I needed people who could skate, I was interested in documenting as a group of people moved by the cement caused a particular sound, a noise like that if you were sanding the floor. People who appropriates the city without permission and changes slowly. For me it is a film about daytime vampires without power. On the other hand, it is a story inspired by my brother, in the innocence you have when you are young and pretend to be criminal without a reason to do so. Finally, in this story I wanted to embrace people disappearing without reason." —Julio Hernández Cordón

== Filmography ==
=== Feature films ===
- Gasolina - 2008
- Dust (Polvo) - 2012
- I Promise You Anarchy (Te Prometo Anarquía) - 2015
- Atrás Hay Relámpagos (2017)
- Buy Me a Gun (Cómprame un revolver) - 2018

=== Documentaries ===
- Marimbas from Hell (Marimbas del Infierno) - 2010
- Hasta el sol tiene manchas - 2012

=== Short films ===
- Km 31 (2003)
