= Tremors (2019 film) =

2019 Guatemalan film

- Film poster
- Spanish: Temblores
- Directed by: Jayro Bustamante
- Written by: Jayro Bustamante
- Produced by: Jayro Bustamante; Gérard Lacroix; Marina Peralta; Pilar Peredo; Georges Renand; Edgard Tenembaum
- Starring: Juan Pablo Olyslager; Diane Bathen; Mauricio Armas Zebadúa
- Cinematography: Luis Armando Arteaga
- Edited by: Cesar Diaz; Santiago Otheguy
- Music by: Pascual Reyes
- Production companies: Tu Vas Voir Productions; La Casa de Production
- Release date: February 8, 2019 (Berlin)
- Running time: 107 minutes
- Countries: Guatemala; France
- Language: Spanish

Tremors (Spanish: Temblores) is a 2019 Guatemalan-French drama film written and directed by Jayro Bustamante. It stars Juan Pablo Olyslager as Pablo, a religious man in conversion therapy who is coping with the aftermath of having come out as gay after having spent many years married to a woman and fathering children.

The film premiered in the Panorama program at the 69th Berlin International Film Festival. It was subsequently screened at the 2019 San Sebastián International Film Festival, where it won the Sebastiane Latino Award for best Latin American LGBTQ-themed film.

Background actors: Gerson Estrada (Cassandra) and Carmelita Guerra.
