= Ixcanul =

2015 film

- Film poster
- Directed by: Jayro Bustamante
- Written by: Jayro Bustamante
- Starring: María Mercedes Coroy; María Telón
- Edited by: César Díaz
- Release dates: 7 February 2015 (Berlin); 25 November 2015 (France)
- Running time: 95 minutes
- Countries: Guatemala; France
- Languages: Kaqchikel; Spanish

Ixcanul ([ʔiʃ.kʰa.nɯɬ], Kaqchikel for "volcano") is a 2015 Guatemalan drama film written and directed by Jayro Bustamante in his directorial debut. It was screened in the main competition section of the 65th Berlin International Film Festival, where it won the Alfred Bauer Prize. The film was selected as the Guatemalan entry for the Best Foreign Language Film at the 88th Academy Awards but was not nominated. It is the first film produced in the Kaqchikel language of the Mayan family.

== Plot ==
The film is set in a village on the flank of an active volcano, where Maria and her parents cultivate coffee. The Kaqchikel villagers, like other Mayans, practice a mixture of Catholicism and the traditional Maya religion, worshiping the Christian God while also making offerings to the goddess that they believe lives in the volcano. Maria has never been beyond the volcano and the village is her world. She has been promised to the plantation foreman, Ignacio, in marriage, but desires a younger plantation worker, who wants to emigrate to the United States. Pepe paints to Maria a picture of the US as a land of plenty and promise, a place where the people enjoy a level of affluence that is unthinkable in Guatemala. When she asks him if he would take her with him, he says he might if she has sex with him although he also says that it is a difficult journey, over a desert and rivers.

The plantation becomes overridden with venomous snakes, making it hazardous for Maria and her family to sow the fields. Ignacio goes to the city for a while, saying he will marry Maria upon his return. The virgin Maria becomes curious about sex, drinks the sap from a tree, and masturbates against the trunk. She seduces Pepe, who is drunk outside the makeshift bar that serves the coffee workers. After they start having intercourse he tells her that there is no danger of pregnancy the first time after she asks him not to come inside her but she becomes pregnant. Pepe agrees to take her to America after he has been paid for the harvest but, after finding his wages have been consumed by his drinks bill at the company owned bar, leaves without telling her and owing debts.

Maria's parents are furious when they learn she is pregnant, saying that Ignacio will have them evicted. Juana, Maria's mother, tries various folk remedies to induce an abortion, none of which work, leading her to the conclusion that the child is fated to be born. Maria argues that, if the snakes are driven away, a new crop of coffee will be planted which would require their labor, making it impossible for the landlord to evict them. Maria and Juana burn the field, but the snakes return. After Juana tells her that being pregnant endows her with a magical "light" that will chase away the snakes as her body becomes a metaphorical volcano, Maria sees a Mayan shaman who performs a ceremony to stoke the "light" inside of her. Juana tries to dissuade her, saying not all magic is real, but she tries anyway and, during her attempt to drive the snakes away by walking across the field, she is bitten and driven to the hospital in a nearby city.

At the hospital, the Spanish only-speaking staff do not understand Kaqchikel, making it impossible for Maria to understand what is said or the form she is asked to initial. She survives but is told by the nurse that her baby died and Maria and her family go home with a coffin. Maria, maddened with grief, exhumes the body because she wants to see her daughter despite being told it was deformed but finds the coffin only contains a brick and a blanket. Maria and her family return to the city to report the missing baby. However, the Spanish only-speaking police officers advise them not to file a complaint because they would be the primary suspects while Ignacio, translating, sabotages the meeting. The film ends with a resigned Maria being dressed as a traditional Mayan bride as she prepares to marry Ignacio.

== Cast ==
- María Mercedes Coroy as Maria
- María Telón as Juana
- Marvin Coroy as El Pepe
- Manuel Manuel Antún as Manuel
- Justo Lorenzo as Ignacio

== Production ==
Ixcanul has a largely non-professional cast. In an interview, Jayro Bustamante, the film's Spanish-speaking director stated he wanted to shoot a film in Kaqchikel because of its low status in Guatemala, being seen as "the language of the Indians". Bustamante wrote the script for Ixcanul in French while studying at a film school in Paris, then translated it into Spanish upon his return to Guatemala, and finally had it translated into Kaqchikel. In Guatemala, street theater is an honorable and respected profession, and Bustamante recruited his cast from street theater veterans. Bustamante recalled that he put up a sign saying "casting", and no-one came; when he put up a sign the next day saying "employment opportunities", he was deluged with would-be actors.

Casting his actresses proved to be a major difficulty in the patriarchal society of Guatemala where machismo is the dominant value as most of the husbands of the street theater actresses proved unwilling to allow their wives to work in a film unsupervised. María Telón, a veteran street theater actress, was cast as Juana largely because as a widow she had no husband to answer to. The 19-year old María Mercedes Coroy, who had never acted before, needed her self-confidence built up to play Maria as Bustamante recalled her saying to him: "Do you remember when we first started rehearsing? I wouldn't open my legs 10 centimeters to do yoga. Then the next thing I know I'm naked in front of the entire country!" Bustamante stated he chose to focus on his female characters because: "In Guatemala, we ignore the strength of women. We throw it away". In another interview, Bustamante described the symbolic parallel between the volcano and Mayan women in Guatemala: "For me, Mayan women in Guatemala today are like that volcano that rumbles and resounds but hasn’t yet erupted. Real change will happen when these women erupt and release what they have inside." Bustamante commented that the film's subtitles did not convey the full richness of the dialogue, noting that in Kaqchikel the word ixcanul means not only volcano, but also "the internal force of the mountain which boils looking for eruption".

== Cultural significance ==
Ixcanul presents real-life issues in a slightly fictionalized manner. Its use of the Kaqchikel language accurately portrays Kaqchikel culture and the community's unique problems. Unlike other films in Indigenous languages, this film gives significant speaking roles to non-native actors. It features first-time actors from the communities near where it was filmed in Guatemala, which is an uncommon practice in film and media production. In an interview with Indiewire, Bustamante expressed that he was trying to illuminate a misrepresented culture. He then emphasizes that he acknowledges that if it were any other people, he would not have been able to do it. He stated that he felt comfortable enough to make a film because he grew up around Mayan people in Guatemala, so he felt an authentic connection. Bustamante grew up in the highlands of Guatemala and identified as mestizo, a term used to describe people of mixed race, specifically those of both European and Indigenous ancestry. Bustamante intended to make a film that genuinely honored the Mayan people without being exploitative or "looking at them as if they were in a zoo".

Ixcanul has been celebrated for its authentic portrayal of Mayan culture and for bringing attention to the experiences of indigenous peoples in Guatemala. The film has been well-received by both Mayan communities and scholars of indigenous studies. It has been shown at international film festivals. According to scholar K.C. Barrientos, the film incorporates Mayan circular cosmologies central to Mayan culture and worldview. The circular motifs in the film are meant to represent the cycles of life, death, rebirth, and the interconnectedness of all things.

Ixcanul has had a significant impact on the film industry and has brought attention to the underrepresented perspectives of indigenous peoples in cinema. Indigenous people have historically been portrayed in films as exotic, primitive, and backward, perpetuating colonialist stereotypes and erasing their diversity and complexity as distinct cultural groups. However, author Milton Fernando Gonzalez Rodriguez points out there has been a shift toward more nuanced and respectful portrayals of indigenous cultures and histories in Latin American cinema. He explores how indigenous filmmakers and actors are challenging dominant narratives and representations of indigenous peoples and using film as a tool for cultural affirmation, political activism, and social change.

== Community reception ==
Ixcanul has also received some critiques from scholars and critics. One major critique is that the film continues to reproduce negative stereotypes of indigenous people as being "primitive", which can be seen as exoticization despite Bustamante's efforts to avoid this. While the film attempts to subvert these ideas by showing the complexity of Mayan culture, some believe it ultimately reinforces them, along with the stereotype of indigenous women as passive and submissive and Mayan people as a whole as having a predisposition to alcohol abuse. Similarly, in their review of the film, the collective Oxlajuj Ajpop, a non-governmental organization focused on studying Kaqchikel (Maya) language and culture, notes that "Ixcanul continues a centuries-long tradition of representing the 'other' through an exoticizing and fetishizing lens."

Many people have criticized the movie Ixcanul for how it portrays indigenous people, which is a problem seen in other popular films, such as Mel Gibson's Apocalypto and Pocahontas by Walt Disney Animation Studios. These portrayals often show indigenous characters as ignorant, uneducated, and uncivilized, which reinforces harmful stereotypes and contributes to the continued marginalization and oppression of indigenous communities. Scholar Ariel Tumbaga points out that these types of narratives can have long-term effects and ignore the complexity of indigenous culture, reinforcing the idea of their inferiority.

== Media reviews ==
Ed Frankel wrote in a laudatory review: "Guatemala's first-ever entry for the foreign language Oscar is an absorbing, beautifully-shot drama of cultural ritual and the drive of one young woman to escape a rudimentary social system." In a review in The Washington Post, Stephanie Merr wrote: "María Mercedes Coroy is riveting, especially as the story takes a turn for the tragic. Few actors convey so much with little more than a deadpan expression. Telón, as the outspoken, larger-than-life Juana, is her perfect counterbalance. Even when she's disappointed with María, she can't hide the profound love she feels for her only child... It all looks fascinatingly foreign to American eyes, but María's story — about rebellion and consequences, oppression and heartbreak — is anything but."

Alex Midgal wrote in The Globe & Mail: "Like its titular Guatemalan volcano, Jayro Bustamante's hypnotic film debut Ixcanul bubbles with the tension of a teenage girl at odds with her family's native customs, before erupting into a frantic and quietly devastating third act." Alisssa Wilkinson wrote in her review: "Shot luminously by Luis Armando Arteaga, each frame holds steady on its subject, inviting the audience to calmly observer the daily routines and customs of its subjects in saturated colors that seem almost to glow".

The critic Frank Ochieng wrote in his review: "Writer-director Jayro Bustamante's absorbing and revealing debut feature, Ixcanul, paints a disturbing portrait that crosses the fine line between tradition and exploitation in the name of the Guatemalan children sacrificed to uphold economical expectations among other considerations. The indigenous existences of children globally are jeopardized through ritualistic justifications that many find vehemently inexcusable and horrifying... Ironically, the only true element that is systematically explosive about Ixcanul is not the proximity of the aforementioned volcano, but the voiceless and powerless minor that does not have a decent say about the psychological and physical loaning of her body to the highest child-exploitive bidder. Unconscionable and regrettably humanistic in tragedy and deemed practicality, Ixcanul is strikingly hypnotic and forceful among the nearby ominous alert of lava-spewing anticipation." David Lewis wrote in his review: "Ixcanul, which takes place near a volcano in Guatemala, is a lyrical film that plays like a well-done National Geographic special — until it unexpectedly turns lava-hot. Throughout, Ixcanul impresses with its attention to detail, chronicling the daily routines of a Mayan coffee-farming village, an isolated place where cars, cell phones and televisions appear to be nonexistent. The ashen volcano hovers ominously, a symbol of pent-up feelings and a smoldering conflict between modernity and tradition."

Andrew Parker wrote in his review: "It often feels like there are a few different movies going on within Ixcanul at the same time, but they're all well constructed enough to make it come together as a mostly cohesive whole. It will definitely be interesting to see where Bustamante goes from here." Dianne Carson wrote about Ixcanul: "Beautifully shot with local residents represented in the cast, the story gains momentum and tragic dimensions as it progresses," Nathaniel Hood wrote in his review: "The film is comfortably languid, interposing Maria's tribulations with the rhythms of everyday life: comings and goings, bouts of drunkenness and lovemaking, moments of stillness and silence. The plot takes off in the last third following a disastrous misjudgment leaving Maria next to dead. After being taken to a hospital, healthcare workers manipulate the language barrier between them and Maria's family to seize her baby, telling her that it died and giving them a coffin with a brick wrapped in cloth in place of the body."

In a review, J. Don Birnam wrote: "It is stunning that, by the end of the film, one is so immersed into the lives of these characters, of their culture and traditions, that when they are thrust into what should be (for us) the more comfortable space of the city and modern civilization, the contrast is jarring and unsettling. The greatest success of the film is that we are made to feel as though we have come to deeply understand a culture that is so deeply unfamiliar to us. In doing so, the movie touches upon many of the challenges and injustices faced by indigenous American peoples, including their inability to communicate, their lack of access to medicine, and more brutal things like corruption at the hands of authorities". Jay Kuehner wrote: "Bustamente thus lays the foundation of a story that's ancient and modern, old as the cinder hills that the family navigates to offer prayers. Enter men into this picture and a tragic element emerges beneath the agrarian routine of harvest, drinking, and waiting for pay. Tempting the mythological, there is a surfeit of snakes in the land these people toil." In a review for The Asahi Shimbun, Claudia Puig wrote: "Ixcanul is a mesmerizing, intimate and meditative coming-of- age tale that explores a culture rarely seen in films".

Justin Chang in the Los Angeles Times wrote: "Yet even as it moves from tender ethnographic portraiture into a realm of hushed, intimate tragedy, Ixcanul quivers with a fierce if understated feminine energy. You can feel it in the women's honest, matter-of-fact acknowledgments of desire (notably, every sexual encounter in the picture is initiated by a female). And the movie's true hero is arguably not María but Juana, wonderfully played by Telón as a pillar of big-hearted resilience even as she acknowledges the limitations of her knowledge. In the story's most devastating moment, Juana cradles her daughter in her arms in the back of a moving truck, weeping as they race the clock toward an uncertain future." In a review in The Manchester Guardian, Jordan Hoffman wrote: "What's most striking about Ixcanul is the elegant way in which it is shot. Scenes are given space, and the audience is allowed ample time to soak up the atmosphere. This is the type of movie that stays with you. The next time I buy a can of coffee, I'll be more cognisant of where it came from."

In a review in The New York Times, Jeannette Catsolius wrote: "More than a fable about the clash of tradition and modernity, Ixcanul is finally a painful illustration of the ease with which those who have power can prey on those who don't". Nathaniel Rogers wrote in his review: "The volcano, in addition to being a beautiful and alien visual backdrop for a movie is also a monolithic wall, blocking their view of the rest of the world; Mexico and the United States, to the North, are more myth than reality. The family hopes to marry their sexually curious daughter off to their comparatively rich boss and thereby lift all their futures. Needless to say, things don't go as planned. While the actions of nearly all the characters are often enraging, Ixcanul is never mean spirited, condemning the exploitation of their ignorance rather than the ignorance itself... Bustamante's well crafted film is authentically steeped in a nearly alien culture but its humanity is entirely familiar."

Sean Axmaker praised the film, writing: "The feature debut of Guatemalan filmmaker Jayro Bustamante is a beautiful and unsentimental portrait of traditional Mayan culture where peasants live in huts without electricity or running water and speak their native Kaqchikel, unable to communicate with the Spanish speakers from the nearby city without an interpreter... Like all of the cast members, Coroy is not a professional actress but her enigmatic face and impassive expression is mesmerizing and she communicates a longing for something more and the determination to stand up for herself. The landscape is stunning, vast and beautiful and dangerous, and beyond the jungle is the massive monolith of black rock and ash that seems to trap them in their poverty." Radheyan Simonpillai likewise praised the film, writing: "Whether we're closely gazing at Maria or watching her stride along the ashy volcano's side from a distance, Bustamante lets images linger long enough for their beauty to fall away, giving us a compelling and tragic look at where our coffee comes from." Kelly Vance described the film as "Jayro Bustamante's gorgeously photographed Ixcanul is the ideal village-picture fable, as fascinating for its innate mythology as for its ethnography." Michael Atkinson lauded the film, writing: "Touching on multiple feminist issues as it goes, and even venturing, gallingly, into the matter of baby trafficking, Ixcanul can suffer from predictability—Bustamante's desire to universalize Maria's arc sometimes makes it end up feeling familiar. But the film's rhythms, details and visuals, particularly that volcano, are vivid and unique."

In a negative review, Scott Marks in San Diego Reader called Ixcanul a "dilatory drama" whose slow pace would alienate most audiences. Daniel Barnes wrote: "A frank depiction of sexuality is one of the film's strongest assets, but the attempts to force melodrama fall flat, and the protagonist is such a moon-faced cipher that it feels almost insultingly respectful. There's nothing glaringly wrong with Ixcanul, it's just hard to get whipped up for stoicism."

== Awards ==
Ixcanul received the Alfred Bauer Prize at the 65th Berlin International Film Festival, where it was also nominated for the Golden Bear prize. The film was awarded the Grand Prix for Best Film at Film Fest Gent in 2015, Best Film at the 55th Cartagena Film Festival, and Best Film and Best Direction at the Guadalajara International Film Festival's Ibero-American Feature Films Competition in 2015. At the 3rd Platino Awards, the film won the Platino Award for Best First Feature Film and additionally received eight nominations in total.

== See also ==
- List of submissions to the 88th Academy Awards for Best Foreign Language Film
- List of Guatemalan submissions for the Academy Award for Best Foreign Language Film
