= La Llorona (2019 film) =

2019 Guatemalan horror film by Jayro Bustamante

- Film poster
- Directed by: Jayro Bustamante
- Written by: Jayro Bustamante; Lisandro Sanchez
- Produced by: Jayro Bustamante; Gustavo Matheu; Georges Renard; Marina Peralta
- Starring: María Mercedes Coroy; Margarita Kenéfic; Sabrina De La Hoz
- Cinematography: Nicolàs Wong Díaz
- Edited by: Gustavo Matheu; Jayro Bustamante
- Music by: Pascual Reyes
- Production companies: Guatemalan Ministry of Culture and Sports (Ministerio de Cultura y Deportes); La Casa de Production; Les Films du Volcan
- Release date: 30 August 2019 (Venice)
- Running time: 97 minutes
- Country: Guatemala
- Languages: Spanish; Mayan-Caqchickel; Mayan-Ixil

La Llorona ([la ʝoˈɾona]), also known as The Weeping Woman, is a 2019 Guatemalan horror film co-written, directed, co-produced, and co-edited by Jayro Bustamante. It was selected as the Guatemalan entry for the Best International Feature Film at the 93rd Academy Awards, making the shortlist of 15 films.

== Plot ==
Former Guatemalan dictator Enrique Monteverde (based on Efraín Ríos Montt) is convicted for orchestrating the native Mayans's genocide in 1982–83. Now elderly, he lives with his wife Carmen, daughter Natalia, granddaughter Sara and their security guard, Letona. During the trial, Natalia is troubled by indigenous women's accounts of being brutalized by Monteverde's army, while Carmen dismisses them as lies. The high court overturns the verdict, ruling his crime cannot be conclusively proven, causing the outraged public to hold nonstop protests outside Monteverde's home.

The sound of a woman weeping interrupts Monteverde's sleep and he narrowly misses shooting his wife. Subsequently, most of his household staff — who are ethnic Kaqchikel people — quit. His devoted housekeeper Valeriana brings in a young woman named Alma to work as a maid. Supernatural activity involving water ensues. One night, Monteverde sees Alma wading through the pool into the house. His family discovers him, sexually aroused, watching Alma wash her dress. Disgusted, Carmen tells Natalia that he was always attracted to native women and reveals her suspicions that Valeriana is his daughter. Later, Natalia learns that the young Alma had a son and daughter who died. Alma teaches Sara to hold her breath under water.

The protests continue, essentially trapping the family in the house. Carmen wets the bed during recurring nightmares where she is a Kaqchikel woman being abducted with two Kaqchikel children by the military. The house is blanketed with flyers of the disappeared from decades earlier; Sara and Alma notice one of the men on the flyers is among the protesters. Suspicion grows within Valeriana when she reveals to Alma that nobody in her village appears to know her.

Valeriana suspects dark magic is at work and attempts to cleanse Monteverde of the evil spirit. Later that night, Sara uses her grandfather’s oxygen cylinder to hold her breath longer under the pool. Terrified, Monteverde starts shooting Alma, accidentally hitting Sara's arm. The house is surrounded by the spirits of the disappeared. Searching around the house, Letona encounters the two Kaqchikel children's spirits who calmly take him away. Valeriana performs a Mayan ceremony while a woman's wailing can be heard. Carmen goes into a trance as she is transported back to the nightmare, which are revealed to be Alma's last moments, watching her children drowned by soldiers before being executed herself by Monteverde. A distraught Carmen strangles Monteverde in the trance and in reality.

At Monteverde's funeral, an old general excuses himself to the bathroom. He hears a woman's wail as the room begins to flood.

== Cast ==
- María Mercedes Coroy as Alma
- Margarita Kenéfic as Carmen
- Sabrina De La Hoz as Natalia
- Julio Díaz as Enrique Monteverde
- María Telón as Valeriana
- Ayla-Elea Hurtado as Sara
- Juan Pablo Olyslager as Letona

== Release ==
La Llorona had its world premiere on 30 August 2019 at the 76th Venice International Film Festival (Giornate degli Autori) and later screened in the Contemporary World Cinema section at the 2019 Toronto International Film Festival.

On 6 August 2020, the film premiered on the horror streaming service Shudder. On October 18, 2022, the film was released by The Criterion Collection on Blu-ray and DVD.

== Reception ==
Critical reception for La Llorona has been positive. On Rotten Tomatoes, the film holds a rating of 96%, based on 95 reviews, with an average rating of 8/10. The website's critical consensus reads "La Llorona puts a fresh spin on the familiar legend by blending the supernatural and the political to resolutely chilling effect." On Metacritic the film holds a weighted average score of 79 out of 100 based on 14 critic reviews, indicating "generally favorable reviews".

La Llorona received praise from Katie Rife from The A.V. Club, who felt that the film offered "a more intelligent spin on the legend than last year’s schlocky The Curse Of La Llorona". She praised its direction, visual style and story which "layers elements of class, race, and gender conflict on top of creeping horror atmosphere", but criticized its pacing which "slows to a crawl, as Bustamante delves into inter-familial dynamics that are interesting but ultimately a distraction from a more satisfying tale of supernatural revenge."

Manohla Dargis from The New York Times described the film as "a thoughtful, low-key Guatemalan movie that deploys its genre shocks inside a sober art-house package". She noted that "its early scenes — with their mannered delivery and narrative ellipses — are right out of the modern art-film stylebook", reminding her of Lucrecia Martel's style. She added "With precise framing, compositional flair and a steady hand, Bustamante layers the story, adding daubs that suggest rather than explain."

Monica Castillo from RogerEbert.com awarded it 3 stars out of 4, stating that "La Llorona is filled with bewitching imagery and tension, even if it’s less full of surprises and jump scares than other horror movies. Bustamante uses the old haunted tale not to scare us, but to force his audience to reflect on the ways they are complicit in oppression."

Meagan Navarro from Bloody Disgusting awarded it 2 1/2 skulls out of 5, writing "Bustamante delivers a sobering evocation for justice, and in the case of La Llorona, it’s by the hands of a folkloric vengeance seeker. Certain aspects of the story are emotionally powerful, while other threads feel underdeveloped. The predictability of the overarching direction means the slow-burn pacing can drag, and the horror elements are very minimal. If you go in expecting something more historically relevant and genre adjacent, it’s easier to find an in to a narrative that's not always easily accessible."

=== Accolades ===
Award	Date of ceremony	Category	Recipient(s)	Result	Ref.
Boston Society of Film Critics	13 December 2020	Best Foreign Language Film	La Llorona	Won	
Chicago Film Critics Association Awards	21 December 2020	Best Foreign Language Film	La Llorona	Nominated	
Houston Film Critics Society	18 January 2021	Best Film in a Foreign Language	La Llorona	Nominated	
San Francisco Bay Area Film Critics Circle	18 January 2021	Best Foreign Language Film	La Llorona	Nominated	
San Francisco Bay Area Film Critics Circle	18 January 2021	Special Citation for Independent Cinema	La Llorona	Won	
Online Film Critics Society	25 January 2021	Best Film Not in the English Language	La Llorona	Nominated	
National Board of Review	26 January 2021	Best Foreign Language Film	La Llorona	Won	
Satellite Awards	15 February 2021	Best Foreign Language Film	La Llorona	Won	
Seattle Film Critics Society	15 February 2021	Best Foreign Language Film	La Llorona	Nominated	
Golden Globe Awards	28 February 2021	Best Foreign Language Film	La Llorona	Nominated	
Goya Awards	6 March 2021	Best Iberoamerican Film	La Llorona	Nominated	
Critics' Choice Movie Awards	7 March 2021	Best Foreign Language Film	La Llorona	Nominated	
Austin Film Critics Association	9 March 2021	Best Foreign Language Film	La Llorona	Nominated	
Platino Awards	3 October 2021	Best Ibero-American Film	La Llorona	Nominated	
Platino Awards	3 October 2021	Best Director	Jayro Bustamante	Nominated	
Platino Awards	3 October 2021	Best Actress	María Mercedes Coroy	Nominated	
Platino Awards	3 October 2021	Best Supporting Actor	Julio Díaz	Nominated	
Platino Awards	3 October 2021	Best Supporting Actress	Sabrina de la Hoz	Nominated	
Platino Awards	3 October 2021	Best Screenplay	Jayro Bustamante, Lisandro Sánchez	Nominated	
Platino Awards	3 October 2021	Best Original Score	Pascual Reyes	Nominated	
Platino Awards	3 October 2021	Best Cinematography	Nicolás Wong	Won	
Platino Awards	3 October 2021	Best Art Direction	Sebastián Muñoz	Nominated	
Platino Awards	3 October 2021	Best Film Editing	Gustavo Matheu, Jayro Bustamante	Won	
Platino Awards	3 October 2021	Best Sound	Eduardo Cáceres	Nominated	

== See also ==
- 2019 Toronto International Film Festival
- List of submissions to the 93rd Academy Awards for Best International Feature Film
- List of Guatemalan submissions for the Academy Award for Best International Feature Film
