= Luis Argueta =

Guatemalan film director and producer

Luis Argueta (born November 7, 1946) is a Guatemalan film director and producer. In 1988 he founded Morningside Movies, primarily producing TV commercials, including many for the Spanish speaking demographic. His 1994 film, El Silencio de Neto (The Silence of Neto) was submitted to the foreign films category in the 67th Academy Awards, the first submission from Guatemala. It is a "coming of age" story that takes place amid a military coup in Guatemala in 1954.

In 2002, Argueta produced and directed "Collect Call", a film about a poor Guatemalan immigrant caught in a spinning NYC film production world.

In 2005, Argueta participated in a documentary film, "Los orígenes del silencio", about the 20 years leading up to the production of "The Silence of Neto".

In 2008, Argueta appeared as Paco the cobbler in "Looking for Palladin", a film about a Hollywood producer finding spiritual grounding during a visit to Guatemala.

In 2010, Argueta produced and directed a documentary film, "abUSed:The Postville Raid", about the May 12, 2008 U.S. Immigration raid of a kosher meat-packing plant in Postville, Iowa.

Argueta studied at the University of Michigan with a scholarship to study Industrial engineering. His movies tend to depict Latin American culture and the struggle for peace.
