= Jayro Bustamante =

Guatemalan film director

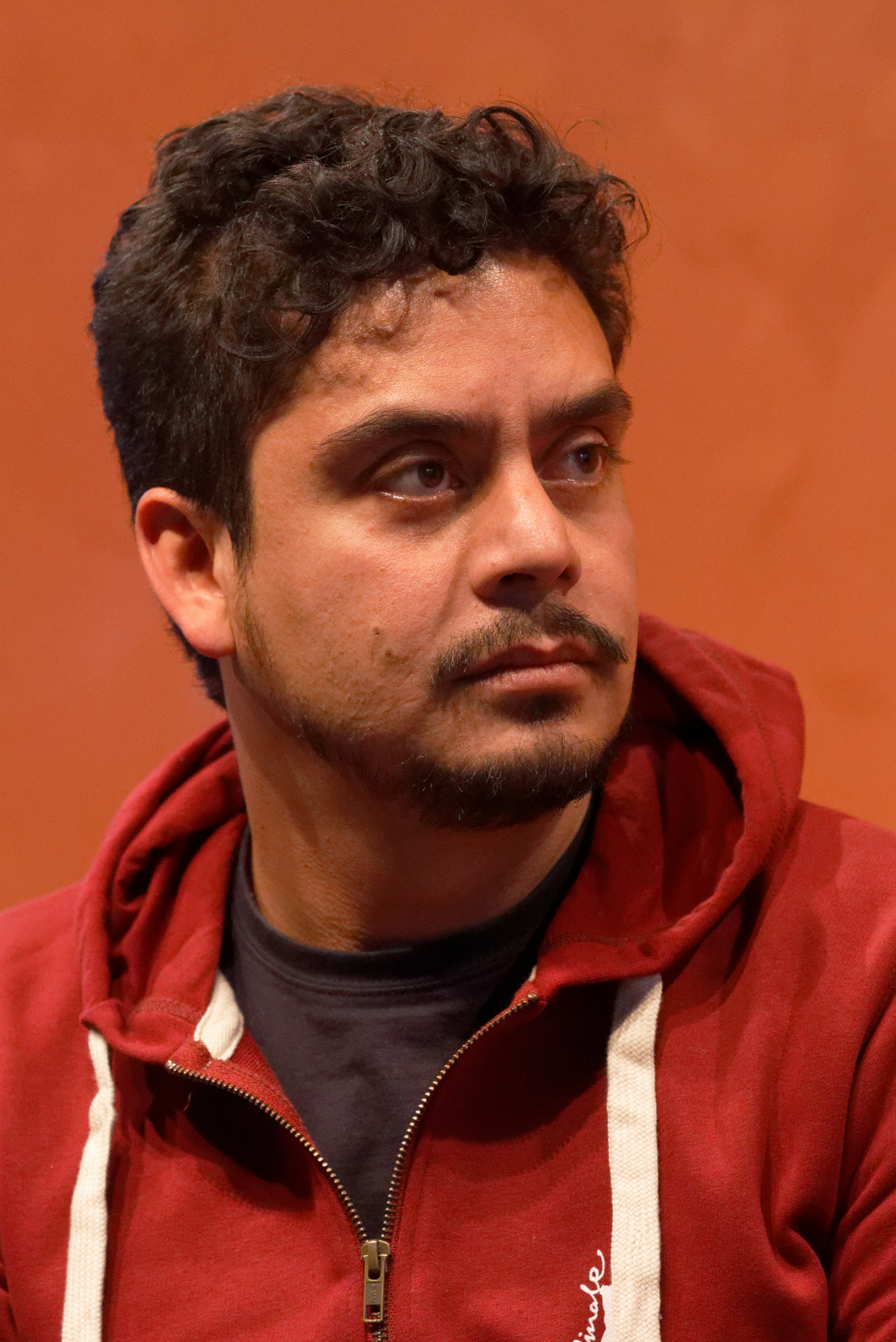
- Jayro Bustamante in 2017
- Born: 7 May 1977 (age 49); Amatitlán, Guatemala
- Education: Universidad de San Carlos de Guatemala
- Occupations: Director; Screenwriter
- Years active: 2006–present

Jayro Bustamante ([ˈxajɾo βustaˈmante]; born 7 May 1977) is a Guatemalan film director and screenwriter. He directed the 2015 film Ixcanul, which was selected as the Guatemalan entry for the Best Foreign Language Film at the 88th Academy Awards. He was named on the jury for the Best First Feature Award at the 67th Berlin International Film Festival.

== Personal life ==
Bustamante grew up in the highlands of Guatemala and identifies as mestizo.

== Filmography ==
- Ixcanul - 2015
- Tremors (Temblores) - 2019
- La Llorona - 2019
- Rita - 2024
- Mountains of Fire (Cordillera de Fuego - 2025)
