= 11th Gaudí Awards =

- Date: 27 January 2019
- Site: Palau de Congressos de Catalunya, Barcelona, Catalonia, Spain
- Hosted by: Mag Lari
- Organized by: Catalan Film Academy

Highlights
- Best Picture: Distances

Television coverage
- Network: TV3
- Viewership: 0.29 million (15.4%)

The 11th Gaudí Awards ceremony, presented by the Catalan Film Academy, was held on 27 January 2019 at the Palau de Congressos de Catalunya in Barcelona. The gala was hosted by Mag Lari.

== Background ==
The nominations were read by David Verdaguer and Núria Prims on 11 December 2018 at La Pedrera's auditorium. In addition to the magic tricks performed by the gala host, the illusionist Mag Lari, the ceremony featured musical performances by Joan Colomo, Alfred García, and Elena Tarrats.

The live broadcast on TV3 attracted about 289,000 viewers in Catalonia (15.4% audience share).

== Winners and nominees ==
The winners and nominees are listed as follows:

Best Film: Distances; Formentera Lady; Jean-François i el sentit de la vida; Yo la busco	Bet Non-Catalan Language Film: Between Two Waters; The Photographer of Mauthausen; Petra; Journey to a Mother's Room
Best Director: Isaki Lacuesta — Between Two Waters; Celia Rico — Journey to a Mother's Room; Elena Trapé — Distances; Jaime Rosales — Petra	Best Screenplay: Celia Rico — Journey to a Mother's Room; Clara Roquet, Jaime Rosales, Michel Gaztambide — Petra; Elena Trapé, Josan Hatero, Miguel Ibáñez Monroy — Distances; Fran Araújo, Isa Campo, Isaki Lacuesta — Between Two Waters
Best Actress: Lola Dueñas — Journey to a Mother's Room; Alexandra Jiménez — Distances; Bárbara Lennie — Petra; Carme Elías — Quién te cantará	Best Actor: Israel Gómez Romero — Between Two Waters; Alex Brendemühl — Petra; Mario Casas — The Photographer of Mauthausen; Sergi López — La vida lliure
Best Supporting Actress: Anna Castillo — Journey to a Mother's Room; Clara Segura — Mirage; Maria Ribera — Distances; Marisa Paredes — Petra	Best Supporting Actor: Oriol Pla — Petra; Alain Hernández — The Photographer of Mauthausen; Eduard Fernández — Everybody Knows; Miki Esparbé — Distances
Best Documentary Film: Petitet; Commander Arian, a Story of Women, War and Freedom; I Hate New York; Trinta lumes	Best Short Film: La última virgen; Primer estrat; Silencio por favor; Tomorrow
Best Television Film: Vida privada; El nom; De la ley a la ley; Vilafranca	Best Cinematography: Diego Dussuel — Between Two Waters; Edu Grau — Quién te cantará; Hélène Louvart — Petra; Óscar Faura — Jurassic World: Fallen Kingdom
Best Production Supervision: Eduard Vallès, Hanga Kurucz — The Photographer of Mauthausen; Aitor Martos — Between Two Waters; Edmon Roch, Toni Novella — Yucatán; Josep Amorós — Journey to a Mother's Room	Best Art Direction: Rosa Ros — The Photographer of Mauthausen; Balter Gallart — Superlópez; Laia Ateca — Quién te cantará; Mireia Carles — Journey to a Mother's Room
Best Editing: Sergi Dies — Between Two Waters; Ana Pfaff — Facing the Wind; Bernat Vilaplana — Jurassic World: Fallen Kingdom; Liana Artigal — Distances	Best Original Music: Kiko Veneno, Raül Refree — Between Two Waters; Diego Navarro — The Photographer of Mauthausen; Gerard Pastor — Jean-François i el sentit de la vida; Josep Sanou — Petitet
Best Costume Design: Mercè Paloma — The Photographer of Mauthausen; Alberto Valcárcel, Cristina Rodríguez — Superlópez; Clara Bilbao — Gun City; Vinyet Escobar — Journey to a Mother's Room	Best Sound: Alejandro Castillo, Amanda Villavieja — Between Two Waters; Oriol Tarragó — Jurassic World: Fallen Kingdom; Albert Manera, Amanda Villavieja — Journey to a Mother's Room; Marc Orts, Oriol Tarragó, Sergio Bürmann — Superlópez
Best Visual Effects: Laura Pedro, Lluís Rivera, Ricard Barriga — Superlópez; Alex Villagrasa, Lluís Rivera — Mirage; Félix Bergés, Lluís Rivera — Gun City; Jordi San Agustín — The Photographer of Mauthausen	Best Makeup and Hairstyles: Caitlin Acheson, Jesús Martos — The Photographer of Mauthausen; Caitlin Acheson, Jesús Martos — Down a Dark Hall; Jesús Martos, Montse Sanfeliu — Superlópez; Noe Montes, Raquel Fidalgo — Gun City
Best Animation Film: Memoirs of a Man in Pajamas; Black Is Beltza	Best European Film: Cold War; Call Me By Your Name; Faces Places; Phantom Thread

=== Public's Choice Special Award ===
Journey to a Mother's Room won the Audience Award.

=== Honorary Gaudí Award ===
Actor Joan Pera was awarded the Honorary Gaudí Award by Mercedes Sampietro.
