= List of Spanish films of 2018 =

A list of Spanish-produced and co-produced feature films released in Spain in 2018. When applicable, the domestic theatrical release date is favoured.

== Films ==
Release		Title (Domestic title)	Cast & Crew	Distribution label	Ref.
J A N U A R Y	5	Holy Goalie (Que baje Dios y lo vea)	Director: Curro Velázquez Cast: Karra Elejalde, Alain Hernández, El Langui, Macarena García	DeAPlaneta	
J A N U A R Y	12	Thi Mai, rumbo a Vietnam	Director: Patricia Ferreira Cast: Carmen Machi, Adriana Ozores, Aitana Sánchez-Gijón, Dani Rovira	Tripictures	
F E B R U A R Y	2	Sara's Notebook (El cuaderno de Sara)	Director: Norberto López Amado Cast: Belén Rueda, Manolo Cardona, Marian Álvarez, Ivan Mendes, Nick Devlin, Marta Belaustegui, Enrico Lo Verso	Buena Vista International	
F E B R U A R Y	23	Sunday's Illness (La enfermedad del domingo)	Director: Ramón Salazar Cast: Bárbara Lennie, Susi Sánchez, Richard Bohringer, Miguel Ángel Solá	Caramel Films	
M A R C H	2	Empowered (Sin rodeos)	Director: Santiago Segura Cast: Maribel Verdú, Candela Peña, Diego Martín, Rafael Spregelburd, Cristina Castaño, Santiago Segura, Alaska, Enrique San Francisco, Mario Vaquerizo, Cristina Pedroche	A Contracorriente Films	
M A R C H	2	Errementari	Director: Paul Urkijo Alijo Cast: Kandido Uranga, Eneko Sagardoy, Uma Bracaglia, Ramón Agirre, Josean Bengoetxea, Gorka Aginagalde, José Ramón Argoitia	Filmax	(Note: Co-production Spain–France (90%–10%).)
M A R C H	9	Escobar (Loving Pablo)	Director: Fernando León de Aranoa Cast: Javier Bardem, Penélope Cruz	Filmax	
M A R C H	9	The Skin of the Wolf (Bajo la piel de lobo)	Director: Samu Fuentes Cast: Mario Casas, Irene Escolar, Ruth Díaz	Alfa Pictures	
M A R C H	16	The Tribe (La tribu)	Director: Fernando Colomo Cast: Paco León, Carmen Machi	Hispano Foxfilm	
A P R I L	6	Champions (Campeones)	Director: Javier Fesser Cast: Javier Gutiérrez	Universal Pictures	
A P R I L	20	The Laws of Thermodynamics (Las leyes de la termodinámica)	Director: Mateo Gil Cast: Chino Darín, Vicky Luengo, Berta Vázquez, Vito Sanz	Sony Pictures	
M A Y	4	Hopelessly Devout (Mi querida cofradía)	Director: Marta Díaz de Lope Díaz Cast: Gloria Muñoz, Pepa Aniorte, Juan Gea, Rocío Molina, Joaquín Núñez, Manuel Morón, Carmen Flores, Alejandro Albarracín, Rosario Pardo	A Contracorriente Films	
J U N E	15	You Shall Not Sleep (No dormirás)	Director: Gustavo Hernández Cast: Belén Rueda, Eva de Dominici, Natalia de Molina	Filmax	(Note: Co-production Spain–Argentina–Uruguay.)
J U N E	22	El mundo es suyo	Director: Alfonso Sánchez Cast: Alfonso Sánchez, Alberto López, Carmen Canivell, Mar Saura, Javier García Pelayo, Carlos Olalla, Mari Paz Sayago, Alfonso Valenzuela	Warner Bros. Pictures	
J U N E	29	Almost 40 (Casi 40)	Director: David Trueba Cast: Lucía Jiménez, Fernando Ramallo, Vito Sanz, Carolina África	Avalon	
J U L Y	6	Jefe	Director: Sergio Barrejón Cast: Luis Callejo, Juana Acosta	Súper 8	
J U L Y	12	The Best Summer of My Life (El mejor verano de mi vida)	Director: Dani de la Orden Cast: Leo Harlem, Maggie Civantos, Toni Acosta, Alejandro Serrano, Stephanie Gil	A Contracorriente Films	
J U L Y	13	Dark Buildings (A Crack in the Wall) (Las grietas de Jara)	Director: Nicolás Gil Lavedra Cast: Oscar Martínez, Joaquín Furriel, Soledad Villamil, Sara Sálamo, Santiago Segura	39 Escalones Films	
A U G U S T	3	Solo	Director: Hugo Stuven Cast: Alain Hernández, Aura Garrido, Ben Temple, Leticia Etala	Filmax	
A U G U S T	17	The Pact (El pacto)	Director: David Victori Cast: Belén Rueda, Mireia Oriol, Darío Grandinetti, Antonio Durán "Morris", Josean Bengoetxea	Sony Pictures	
A U G U S T	24	The Footballest (Los futbolísimos)	Director: Miguel Ángel Lamata Cast: Julio Bohigas, Milene Mayer, Marcos Milara, Iker Castiñeira, Daniel Crego, Roberto Rodríguez, Samantha Jaramillo, Martina Cabrera, Pablo Isabel, Joaquín Reyes, Carmen Ruiz, Antonio Pagudo, Norma Ruiz, Toni Acosta, Jorge Usón	Paramount Pictures	
A U G U S T	31	Yucatan (Yucatán)	Director: Daniel Monzón Cast: Luis Tosar, Rodrigo de la Serna, Joan Pera, Stephanie Cayo	Hispano Foxfilm	
S E P T E M B E R	7	When Angels Sleep (Cuando los ángeles duermen)	Director: Gonzalo Bendala Cast: Julián Villagrán, Marian Álvarez, Ester Expósito	Filmax	
S E P T E M B E R	7	Carmen & Lola (Carmen y Lola)	Director: Arantxa Echevarría Cast: Zaira Romero, Rosy Rodríguez, Moreno Borja, Rafaela León, Carolina Yuste	Súper 8	
S E P T E M B E R	7	Distances (Les distàncies)	Director: Elena Trapé Cast: Alexandra Jiménez, Miki Esparbé, Isak Férriz, Bruno Sevilla, Maria Ribera	Sherlock Films	
S E P T E M B E R	14	Everybody Knows (Todos lo saben)	Director: Asghar Farhadi Cast: Javier Bardem, Penélope Cruz, Ricardo Darín, Bárbara Lennie, Eduard Fernández	Universal Pictures	(Note: Co-production Spain–France–Italy (50%–40%–10%).)
S E P T E M B E R	21	Diana	Director: Alejo Moreno Cast: Ana Rujas, Jorge Roldán, Laura Ledesma, Lucio Romero, Cayetana Cabezas, Moisés Rodríguez	—N/a	
S E P T E M B E R	28	The Realm (El reino)	Director: Rodrigo Sorogoyen Cast: Antonio de la Torre, Mónica López, Josep Maria Pou, Nacho Fresneda, Ana Wagener, Bárbara Lennie	Warner Bros. Pictures	
S E P T E M B E R	28	Oreina	Director: Koldo Almandoz Cast: Laulad Ahmed Saleh, Patxi Bisquert, Ramón Agirre, Iraia Elias, Erika Olaizola	Golem	
O C T O B E R	5	Crime Wave (Ola de crímenes)	Director: Gracia Querejeta Cast: Maribel Verdú, Juana Acosta, Paula Echevarría, Antonio Resines, Raúl Arévalo, Luis Tosar, Javier Cámara	Universal Pictures	
O C T O B E R	5	Journey to a Mother's Room (Viaje al cuarto de una madre)	Director: Celia Rico Clavellino Cast: Lola Dueñas, Anna Castillo, Pedro Casablanc	Alfa Pictures	
O C T O B E R	5	Ánimas	Director: Laura Alvea, Jose F. Ortuño Cast: Ángela Molina, Luis Bermejo, Chacha Huang, Clare Durant	Filmax	
O C T O B E R	11	Gun City (La sombra de la ley)	Director: Dani de la Torre Cast: Luis Tosar, Michelle Jenner, Vicente Romero, Manolo Solo, Paco Tous, Jaime Lorente, Adriana Torrebejano, Ernesto Alterio	Hispano Foxfilm	
O C T O B E R	19	Petra	Director: Jaime Rosales Cast: Bárbara Lennie, Alex Brendemühl, Joan Botey, Marisa Paredes	Wanda Visión	
O C T O B E R	19	Unbridled (Animales sin collar)	Director: Jota Linares Cast: Natalia de Molina, Daniel Grao, Natalia Mateo, Ignacio Mateos, Borja Luna, Mario Tardón, Mariana Cordero	eOne Films	
O C T O B E R	26	The Photographer of Mauthausen (El fotógrafo de Mauthausen)	Director: Mar Targarona Cast: Mario Casas, Alain Hernández, Frank Feys, Rubén Yuste	Filmax	
O C T O B E R	26	Quién te cantará	Director: Carlos Vermut Cast: Najwa Nimri, Eva Llorach, Carme Elias, Natalia de Molina	Caramel Films	(Note: Co-production Spain–France (90%–10%).)
O C T O B E R	31	El Angel (El Ángel)	Director: Luis Ortega Cast: Lorenzo Ferro, Chino Darín, Peter Lanzani, Mercedes Morán, Luis Gnecco, Daniel Fanego, Cecilia Roth	BTeam Pictures	(Note: Co-production Argentina–Spain (80%–20%).)
O C T O B E R	31	The Tree of Blood (El árbol de la sangre)	Director: Julio Medem Cast: Úrsula Corberó, Álvaro Cervantes, Najwa Nimri, Maria Molins, Patricia López Arnaiz, Daniel Grao, Joaquín Furriel, Emilio Gutiérrez Caba, Luisa Gavasa, José María Pou, Ángela Molina	Diamond Films	(Note: Co-production Spain–France (80%–20%).)
O C T O B E R	31	Not the End (Sin fin)	Director: César Esteban Alenda, José Esteban Alenda Cast: María León, Javier Rey, Mari Paz Sayago	Filmax	
N O V E M B E R	9	Your Son (Tu hijo)	Director: Miguel Ángel Vivas Cast: José Coronado, Pol Monen, Ana Wagener, Asia Ortega, Ester Expósito	eOne Films	
N O V E M B E R	9	Ana by Day (Ana de día)	Director: Andrea Jaurrieta Cast: Ingrid García-Jonsson, Mona Martínez, Álvaro Ogalla, Fernando Albizu	Syldavia Cinema	
N O V E M B E R	16	The Silence of Others (El silencio de otros)	Director: Almudena Carracedo & Robert Bahar	BTeam Pictures	(Note: Co-production Spain–United States (25%–75%).)
N O V E M B E R	16	Happy Sad (Alegría tristeza)	Director: Ibon Cormenzana Cast: Roberto Álamo, Maggie Civantos, Claudia Placer, Manuela Vellés, Pedro Casablanc, Carlos Bardem	Alfa Pictures	
N O V E M B E R	16	The Uncovering (El desentierro)	Director: Nacho Ruipérez Cast: Michel Noher, Jan Cornet, Leonardo Sbaraglia, Francesc Garrido, Jordi Rebellón, Jelena Jovanova, Ana Torrent, Arben Bajraktaraj, Nesrin Cavadzade	Filmax	
N O V E M B E R	23	Superlópez	Director: Javier Ruiz Caldera Cast: Dani Rovira, Alexandra Jiménez, Julián López, Maribel Verdú	Buena Vista International	
N O V E M B E R	23	A Twelve-Year Night (La noche de 12 años)	Director: Álvaro Brechner Cast: Antonio de la Torre, Chino Darín, Alfonso Tort, Soledad Villamil	Syldavia Cinema	(Note: Co-production Spain–France–Argentina (70%–10%–20%).)
N O V E M B E R	30	Mirage (Durante la tormenta)	Director: Oriol Paulo Cast: Adriana Ugarte, Chino Darín, Javier Gutiérrez, Álvaro Morte, Nora Navas	Warner Bros. Pictures	
D E C E M B E R	14	Mylove Lost (Miamor perdido)	Director: Emilio Martínez-Lázaro Cast: Dani Rovira, Michelle Jenner	Sony Pictures	
D E C E M B E R	14	Yuli: The Carlos Acosta Story (Yuli)	Director: Icíar Bollaín Cast: Carlos Acosta, Santiago Alfonso, Keyvin Martínez, Edilson Manuel Olbera	eOne Films	(Note: Co-production Spain–Germany–United Kingdom (50%–20%–30%).)
D E C E M B E R	28	Some Time Later (Tiempo después)	Director: José Luis Cuerda Cast: Blanca Suárez, Roberto Álamo, Arturo Valls, Miguel Rellán, Manolo Solo, Antonio de la Torre, María Ballesteros, Andreu Buenafuente, Berto Romero, Daniel Pérez Prada, Raúl Cimas, Joaquín Reyes, Estefanía de los Santos, Nerea Camacho	eOne Films	(Note: Co-production Spain–Portugal (90%–10%).)

== Box office ==
The ten highest-grossing Spanish feature films in 2018, by domestic box office gross revenue, are as follows:

Highest-grossing films of 2018
Rank	Title	Distributor	Admissions	Domestic gross (€)
1	Champions (Campeones)	Universal Pictures	3,250,299	18,803,731
2	Superlópez	Buena Vista International	1,776,175	10,457,765
3	The Best Summer of My Life (El mejor verano de mi vida)	A Contracorriente Films	1,423,546	8,068,612
4	Perfect Strangers (Perfectos desconocidos) ‡	Universal Pictures	1,257,599	7,764,309
5	The Tribe (La tribu)	Hispano Foxfilm	1,002,576	6,073,079
6	Sara's Notebook (El cuaderno de Sara)	Buena Vista International	880,629	5,329,392
7	Yucatán	Hispano Foxfilm	903,419	5,046,346
8	Empowered (Sin rodeos)	A Contracorriente Films	755,776	4,574,406
9	The Footballest (Los futbolísimos)	Paramount Pictures	633,833	3,377,538
10	Everybody Knows (Todos los saben)	Universal Pictures	574,794	3,134,521
‡: 2017 theatrical opening

== See also ==
- 33rd Goya Awards
