= 66th San Sebastián International Film Festival =

2018 film festival

- Location: San Sebastián, Spain
- Awards: Golden Shell: Between Two Waters
- Directors: José Luis Rebordinos
- Festival date: 21–29 September 2018

San Sebastián International Film Festival
- 67th 65th

The 66th San Sebastián International Film Festival took place from 21 to 29 September 2018 in San Sebastián, Gipuzkoa, Spain. Between Two Waters won the Golden Shell for Best Picture.

== Background ==
For its 66th edition, the festival revamped its image, including the use of a minimalist sea shell logo, presented on 3 May 2018. In August 2018, the festival revealed the festival poster featuring Isabelle Huppert. The opening gala was hosted by Nagore Aranburu and Belén Cuesta.

The festival closed with the screening of A Star Is Born. The closing gala was hosted by Maribel Verdú and Edurne Ormazabal.

The composition of the official selection jury consisted of Alexander Payne (Jury President), Bet Rourich, Agnes Johansen, Nahuel Perez Biscayart, Constantin Popescu, and Rossy de Palma.

== Films ==
=== Official Selection ===
In competition

The lineup of films selected for the Official Selection competition was as follows:

Highlighted title indicates award winner.

English title	Original title	Director(s)	Production country
An Unexpected Love	El amor menos pensado	Juan Vera	Argentina
Alpha, the Right to Kill		Brillante Mendoza	Philippines
Angelo		Markus Schleinzer	Austria; Luxembourg
Baby	宝贝儿	Liu Jie	China
Beautiful Boy		Felix Van Groeningen	United States
Blind Sport		Tuva Novotny	Norway
The Innocent	Der Unschuldige	Simon Jaquemet	Switzerland; Germany
The Realm	El reino	Rodrigo Sorogoyen	Spain; France
Between Two Waters	Entre dos aguas	Isaki Lacuesta	Spain
High Life		Claire Denis	France; Germany; United Kingdom; Poland; United States
Illang: The Wolf Brigade	인랑	Kim Jee-woon	South Korea
In Fabric		Peter Strickland	United Kingdom
A Faithful Man	L'homme fidèle	Louis Garrel	France
The Black Book	Le Cahier Noir	Valeria Sarmiento	France; Portugal
Quién te cantará		Carlos Vermut	Spain; France
Rojo		Benjamín Naishtat	Argentina; Belgium; Brazil; Germany; France; Switzerland
Vision		Naomi Kawase	Japan; France
Yuli: The Carlos Acosta Story	Yuli	Icíar Bollaín	Spain; Cuba; United Kingdom; Germany

Out of competition

The following works were selected to screen out of competition:

English title	Original title	Director(s)	Production countrie(s)
Bad Times at the El Royale		Drew Goddard	United States
Gigantes (series)		Enrique Urbizu, Jorge Dorado	Spain
Special Screenings
Dantza		Telmo Esnal	Spain
Some Time Later	Tiempo después	José Luis Cuerda	Spain; Portugal

=== New Directors ===
Highlighted title indicates award winner.

English title	Original title	Director(s)	Production countrie(s)
Notes for a Heist Film	Apuntes para una película de atracos	León Siminiani	Spain
Jesus	僕はイエス様が嫌い	Hiroshi Okuyama	Japan
Midnight Runner	Der Läufer	Hannes Baumgartner	Switzerland
Julia and the Fox	Julia y el zorro	Inés María Barrionuevo	Argentina
The Chambermaid	La camarista	Lila Avilés	Mexico
Meteorites	Les Météorites	Romain Laguna	France
Cold November	Nëntor i ftohtë	Ismet Sijarina	Kosovo; Albania; North Macedonia
Neon Heart	Usynligt hjerte	Laurits Flensted-Jensen	Denmark
The Deer	Oreina	Koldo Almandoz	Spain
To War	Para la guerra	Francisco Marise	Argentina; Spain
Breeze	清风的味道	Kun Yang	China
Core of the World	Сердце мира	Nataliya Meshchaninova	Russia; Lithuania
The Third Wife	Vợ ba	Ash Mayfair	Vietnam
A Decent Man	Un om la locul lui	Hadrian Marcu	Romania
Journey to a Mother's Room	Viaje al cuarto de una madre	Celia Rico Clavellino	Spain; France

=== Latin Horizons (Horizontes Latinos) ===
Highlighted title indicates award winner.

English title	Original title	Director(s)	Production countrie(s)
The Heiresses	Las herederas	Marcelo Martinessi	Paraguay; Germany; Brazil; Uruguay; Norway; France
Buy Me a Gun	Cómprame un revólver	Julio Hernández Cordón	Mexico
The Snatch Thief	El motoarrebatador	Agustín Toscano	Argentina; Uruguay; France
Enigma		Ignacio Juricic Merillán	Chile
A Family Submerged	Familia sumergida	Maria Alché	Argentina; Brazil; Germany; Norway
Rust	Ferrugem	Aly Muritiba	Brazil
Figures	Figuras	Eugenio Canevari	Spain; Argentina
A Twelve-Year Night	La noche de 12 años	Álvaro Brechner	Spain; Argentina; France; Uruguay
Los silencios		Beatriz Seigner	Brazil; France; Colombia
Marilyn		Martín Rodríguez Redondo	Argentina; Chile
Our Time	Nuestro tiempo	Carlos Reygadas	Mexico; France; Germany; Denmark; Sweden
Florianópolis Dream	Sueño Florianópolis	Ana Katz	Argentina; Brazil; France

=== Zabaltegi-Tabakalera ===
Highlighted title indicates award winner.

English title	Original title	Director(s)	Production countrie(s)
Above 592 metres	592 metroz goiti	Maddi Barber	Spain
Belmonte		Federico Veiroj	Uruguay; Mexico; Spain
Bergman: A Year in a Life	Bergman — ett ar, ett liv	Jane Magnusson	Sweden
Coincoin and the Extra-Humans	Coincoin et les z'inhumains	Bruno Dumont	France
An Elephant Sitting Still	大象席地而坐	Hu Bo	China
De natura		Lucile Hadzihalilovic	Romania
Long Day's Journey into Night	地球最後的夜晚	Bi Gan	China
Manta Ray	กระเบนราหู	Phuttiphong Aroonpheng	Thailand; France
The Wolf House	La casa lobo	Joaquín Cociña, Cristóbal León	Chile
Song for the Jungle		Jean-Gabriel Périot	France
Sophia Antipolis		Virgil Vernier	France
Theatre of War	Teatro de guerra	Lola Arias	Argentina; Spain; Germany
The Men Behind the Wall		Ines Moldavsky	Israel
Trot	Trote	Xacio Baño	Spain; Lithuania
The Daughters of Fire	Las hijas del fuego	Albertina Carri	Argentina
The Image Book	Le livre d'image	Jean-Luc Godard	Switzerland; France
Those Who Desire	Los que desean	Elena López Riera	Switzerland; Spain
Sobre cosas que me han pasado		José Luis Torres Leiva	Chile

=== Perlak ===
English title	Original title	Director(s)	Production countrie(s)
A Star Is Born		Bradley Cooper	United States
3 Faces	سه رخ	Jafar Panahi	Iran
Ash Is Purest White	江湖儿女	Jia Zhangke	China; France; Japan
BlacKkKlansman		Spike Lee	United States
Capernaum	Capharnaüm	Nadine Labaki	Lebanon
The Angel	El Ángel	Luis Ortega	Argentina; Spain
First Man		Damien Chazelle	United States
Girl		Lukas Dhont	Belgium; Netherlands
Summer	Лето	Kirill Serebrennikov	Russia; France
Mirai	未来のミライ	Mamoru Hosoda	Japan
Asako I & II	寝ても覚めても	Ryusuke Hamaguchi	Japan
Birds of Passage	Pájaros de verano	Cristina Gallego, Ciro Guerra	Colombia; Mexico; Denmark; France
Petra		Jaime Rosales	Spain; France; Denmark
Roma		Alfonso Cuarón	Mexico
The Sisters Brothers		Jacques Audiard	France; Belgium; Romania; Spain
Another Day of Life	Jeszcze dzień życia	Raúl de la Fuente, Damian Nenow	Spain; Poland; Belgium; Germany
Cold War	Zimna wojna	Pawel Pawlikowski	Poland; United Kingdom; France

=== Made in Spain ===
English title	Original title	Director(s)	Production countrie(s)
Almost Forty	Casi 40	David Trueba	Spain
Facing the Wind	Con el viento	Meritxell Colell	Spain; Argentina; France
The Warning	El aviso	Daniel Calparsoro	Spain
I Hate New York		Gustavo Sánchez	Spain
Sunday's Illness	La enfermedad del domingo	Ramón Salazar	Spain
Distances	Les distàncies	Elena Trapé	Spain
Hopelessly Devout	Mi querida cofradía	Marta Díaz de Lope Díaz	Spain
Perfect Strangers	Perfectos desconocidos	Álex de la Iglesia	Spain
Querido Fotogramas		Sergio Oksman	Spain
The Bookshop		Isabel Coixet	Spain; United Kingdom
Thirty Souls	Trinta lumes	Diana Toucedo	Spain

== Awards ==
A list of awards conceded during the festival includes:

=== Main competition ===
- Golden Shell for Best Film: Between Two Waters
- Special Jury Prize: Alpha, the Right to Kill
- Silver Shell for Best Director: Benjamín Naishtat (Rojo)
- Silver Shell for Best Actress: Pia Tjelta (Blind Spot)
- Silver Shell for Best Actor: Darío Grandinetti (Rojo)
- Jury Prize For Best Cinematography: Pedro Sotero (Rojo)
- Jury Prize For Best Screenplay: Paul Laverty (Yuli) and Louis Garrel and Jean-Claude Carrière (A Faithful Man)

=== Other ===
- Horizontes Award: A Family Submerged
  - Special Mention: The Snatch Thief
- Kutxabank New Directors' Award: Jesus
- Ezae Youth Award: Journey to a Mother's Room
- Audience Award for Best Picture: Another Day of Life
- Audience Award for Best European Picture: Girl
- Zabaltegi-Tabakalera Award: Song for the Jungle
  - Special Mention: Those Who Desire
- Irizar Basque Film Award: The Deer
- FIPRESCI Award: High Life
- Feroz Zinemaldia Award: Quién te cantará

== Bibliography ==
- Rubio Pobes, Coro (2018). "66 Festival Internacional de Cine de San Sebastián. Una inmensa oferta y una nueva imagen". Filmhistoria Online. 28 (1–2). Barcelona: Universitat de Barcelona.
