= 6th Feroz Awards =

2019 Spanish film and television awards

- Date: January 19, 2019
- Site: Bilbao Arena, Bilbao
- Hosted by: Ingrid García-Jonsson
- Organized by: Asociación de Informadores Cinematográficos de España

Highlights
- Best Picture: The Realm (Drama); Champions (Comedy)
- Best Direction: Rodrigo Sorogoyen; The Realm
- Best Actor: Antonio de la Torre; The Realm
- Best Actress: Eva Llorach; Quién te cantará
- Most awards: The Realm (5)
- Most nominations: The Realm (10)

The 6th award ceremony of the Feroz Awards was held at the Bilbao Arena, in Bilbao, on January 19, 2019. The ceremony was hosted by Ingrid García-Jonsson and was streamed live via YouTube.

== Winners and nominees ==
Nominations were announced on 4 December 2018 in Madrid by María Guerra, Javier Ambrossi and Javier Calvo.

=== Film ===
Best Drama Film: The Realm; Carmen & Lola; Petra; Quién te cantará; Everybody Knows; Journey to a Mother's Room	Best Comedy Film: Champions; Almost 40; Hopelessly Devout; Superlópez; Some Time Later
Best Director: Rodrigo Sorogoyen — The Realm; Arantxa Echevarría — Carmen & Lola; Javier Fesser — Champions; Ramón Salazar — Sunday's Illness; Carlos Vermut — Quién te cantará	Best Screenplay: Rodrigo Sorogoyen, Isabel Peña — The Realm; Arantxa Echevarría — Carmen & Lola; Jaime Rosales, Michel Gaztambide and Clara Roquet — Petra; Carlos Vermut — Quién te cantará; Celia Rico Clavellino — Journey to a Mother's Room
Best Main Actor: Antonio de la Torre — The Realm; Javier Bardem — Everybody Knows; José Coronado — Your Son; Javier Gutiérrez — Champions; Javier Rey — Not the End	Best Main Actress: Eva Llorach — Quién te cantará; Penélope Cruz — Everybody Knows; Lola Dueñas — Journey to a Mother's Room; Alexandra Jiménez — Distances; Bárbara Lennie — Petra
Best Supporting Actor: Luis Zahera — The Realm; Joan Botey — Petra; Eduard Fernández — Everybody Knows; Ignacio Mateos — Unbridled; Josep Maria Pou — The Realm	Best Supporting Actress: Anna Castillo — Journey to a Mother's Room; Bárbara Lennie — Everybody Knows; Natalia de Molina — Quién te cantará; Marisa Paredes — Petra; Ana Wagener — The Realm
Best Original Soundtrack: Alberto Iglesias — Quién te cantará; Lucas Vidal — The Tree of Blood; Nico Casal — Sunday's Illness; Olivier Arson — The Realm; Alberto Iglesias — Yuli	Best Trailer: Miguel Ángel Trudu — Quién te cantará; Miguel Ángel Trudu, Rafa Martínez — Champions; Pedro Jiménez —Carmen & Lola; Rafa Martínez —The Realm; Asghar Farhadi —Everybody Knows
Best Film Poster: Carlos Vermut — Quién te cantará; Bárbara Magdalena — Ana by Day; Elena Castillo — Distances; Jordi Rins — Sunday's Illness; Gonzalo Rute — The Realm	Best Documentary Film: Apuntes para una película de atracos; Mudar la piel; The Silence of Others; Trinta lumes; Young & Beautiful
Special Award: Between Two Waters; Con el viento; Dhogs; El rey; Oreina

=== Television ===
Best Drama Series: Cocaine Coast (season 1, Antena 3); What the Future Holds (season 1, Movistar+); Élite (season 1, Netflix); Gigantes (season 1, Movistar+); La peste (season 1, Movistar+)	Best Comedy Series: Arde Madrid (season 1, Movistar+); Paquita Salas (season 2, Netflix); Vergüenza (season 2, Movistar+)
Best Main Actor in a Series: Javier Rey — Cocaine Coast; Brays Efe — Paquita Salas; Javier Gutiérrez — Vergüenza; Paco León — Arde Madrid; Oriol Pla — What the Future Holds	Best Main Actress in a Series: Inma Cuesta — Arde Madrid; Malena Alterio — Vergüenza; Aura Garrido — What the Future Holds; Najwa Nimri — Vis a vis; Eva Ugarte — Mira lo que has hecho
Best Supporting Actor in a Series: Antonio Durán "Morris" — Cocaine Coast; Jesús Carroza — What the Future Holds; Karra Elejalde — What the Future Holds; Miguel Rellán — Vergüenza; Manolo Solo — La peste; Julián Villagrán — Arde Madrid	Best Supporting Actress in a Series: Anna Castillo — Arde Madrid; Belén Cuesta — Paquita Salas; Fabiana García Lago — Arde Madrid; Debi Mazar — Arde Madrid; Lidia San José — Paquita Salas

=== Feroz de Honor ===
- José Luis Cuerda

== See also ==
- 33rd Goya Awards
