= 28th Actors and Actresses Union Awards =

2019 Spanish award ceremony

- Date: 11 March 2019
- Site: Circo Price, Madrid, Spain
- Hosted by: Ángel Ruiz & Verónica Ronda
- Organized by: Actors and Actresses Union

Highlights
- Honorary career award: Marisa Paredes

The 28th Actors and Actresses Union Awards were held on 11 March 2019 at the Circo Price, in Madrid. The gala was hosted by Ángel Ruiz and Verónica Ronda.

In addition to the competitive awards, Sandra Sabatés received the 'Mujeres en Unión' award, Marisa Paredes the 'A toda una vida' career award and the Subcommittee for the Charter of the Artist the Special Award.

== Winners and nominees ==
The winners and nominees are listed as follows:

=== Film ===
Best Male Performance in a Leading Role: Antonio de la Torre — The Realm; José Coronado — Your Son; Javier Bardem — Everybody Knows	Best Female Performance in a Leading Role: Susi Sánchez — Sunday's Illness; Bárbara Lennie — Sunday's Illness; Penélope Cruz — Everybody Knows
Best Male Performance in a Secondary Role: Juan Margallo — Champions; Alberto San Juan — El rey; Luis Zahera — The Realm	Best Female Performance in a Secondary Role: Ana Wagener — The Realm; Alexandra Jiménez — Superlópez; Carolina Yuste — Carmen & Lola
Best Male Performance in a Minor Role: Luis Bermejo — Your Son; Carlos Bardem — Happy Sad; Oriol Pla — Petra	Best Female Performance in a Minor Role: Elvira Mínguez — Everybody Knows; Petra Martínez — Petra; Sonia Almarcha — The Realm

=== Television ===
Best Male Performance in a Leading Role: Álvaro Morte — Money Heist; Javier Gutiérrez — Estoy vivo; Javier Rey — Cocaine Coast	Best Female Performance in a Leading Role: Inma Cuesta — Arde Madrid; Belén Cuesta — Paquita Salas; Alba Flores — Money Heist
Best Male Performance in a Secondary Role: Antonio Durán, "Morris" — Cocaine Coast; Alejo Sauras — Estoy vivo; Jaime Lorente — Money Heist	Best Female Performance in a Secondary Role: Anna Castillo — Arde Madrid; Adriana Ozores — Velvet Colección; Elisabet Gelabert — Gigantes
Best Male Performance in a Minor Role: Julián Villagrán — Arde Madrid; Borja Maestre — Amar es para siempre; Jesús Castejón — Locked Up	Best Female Performance in a Minor Role: Miren Ibarguren — Arde Madrid; Yolanda Ramos — Paquita Salas; Pepa Gracia — A Different View

=== Theatre ===
Best Male Performance in a Leading Role: Juan Codina — Luces de bohemia; Alberto Berzal — 1984; Carlos Hipólito — Billy Elliot	Best Female Performance in a Leading Role: Laura Toledo — La voz dormida; Bárbara Lennie — El tratamiento; Susana Hernáiz — La extraña pareja
Best Male Performance in a Secondary Role: Pepe Viyuela — El burlador de Sevilla; Adrián Lastra — Billy Elliot; Luis Rallo — 1984	Best Female Performance in a Secondary Role: Natalia Hernández — La ternura; Mabel del Pozo — El curioso incidente del perro a medianoche; Clara Sanchis — Consentimiento
Best Male Performance in a Minor Role: Juan Vinuesa — Algún día todo esto será tuyo; Antonio Gil — Hablar por hablar; Jorge Torres — El auto de los inocentes	Best Female Performance in a Minor Role: Ángeles Martín — Hablar por hablar; Lidia Navarro — Llueven vacas; Montse Peidro — El auto de los inocentes

=== Newcomers ===
Best New Actor: Álex Villazán — El curioso incidente del perro a medianoche; Sergio Castellanos — La peste; Borja Luna — Unbridled	Best New Actress: Eva Llorach — Who Will Sing to You; Zaira Romero — Carmen & Lola; Abril Zamora — Locked Up

=== International Production ===
Best Male Performance in an International Production: Alberto Ammann — Narcos: Mexico; Óscar Jaenada — Luis Miguel: The Series; Paco León — The House of Flowers	Best Female Performance in an International Production: Penélope Cruz — American Crime Story: Versace; Belén Rueda — You Shall Not Sleep; Natalia de Molina — You Shall Not Sleep
