= Dating in Barcelona =

- Theatrical release poster
- Spanish: Citas: la película
- Directed by: Gemma Ferratè
- Screenplay by: Clara Esparrach Grau
- Story by: Pau Freixas
- Produced by: Carlos Fernández; Laura Fernández Brites
- Starring: Susana Abaitua; Ana Valeria Becerril; Berta Castañé; Christian Checa; Paula Màlia; Àlex Maruny; Álvaro Mel; Oriol Pla; Javier Rey; Natalia Verbeke; Àlex Brendemühl
- Cinematography: David Valldepérez
- Edited by: Camila Musteikis
- Production companies: Citas Barcelona la película AIE; Castelao Pictures; Castelao Productions; Arca Audiovisual
- Distributed by: Filmax
- Release dates: 16 November 2026 (Cine Capitol); 20 November 2026 (Spain)
- Running time: 87 minutes
- Country: Spain
- Language: Spanish

Dating in Barcelona (Spanish: Citas: la película) is a 2026 anthology romantic comedy film directed by Gemma Ferratè an from a screenplay by Clara Esparrach Grau based on a story by Pau Freixas. Its ensemble cast features Natalia Verbeke, Javier Rey, Berta Castañé, Álvaro Mel, Ana Valeria Becerril, Oriol Pla, Susana Abaitua, and Paula Malia.

== Plot ==
The plot consists of four romantic vignettes taking place in Barcelona during the Day of Sant Jordi.

== Cast ==
- Natalia Verbeke as Mar
- Berta Castañé as Bárbara Sánchez
- Susana Abaitua as Lúa
- Ana Valeria Becerril
- Christian Checa
- Paula Malia
- Àlex Maruny
- Álvaro Mel
- Oriol Pla
- Javier Rey
- Àlex Brendemühl

== Production ==
Citas: la película transfers to a feature film the idea of the series Cites created by Pau Freixas, based in turn in the British series Dates. Developed by Filmax, the production had the backing from ICAA and the collaboration of Prime Video. It was fully shot in Barcelona.

== Release ==
The film received a premiere at Cine Capitol in Madrid on 16 November 2026. Distributed by Filmax, it is scheduled to be released theatrically in Spain on 20 November 2026.

== Reception ==
In a 2-star rating, Manuel J. Lombardo of Diario de Sevilla wrote that Ferraté's direction may be well authored by artificial intelligence, and that the main value of the film lies on the cast, primarily the actors in the dinner vignette featuring Abaitua, Pla, Maruny, and Malia.

Pere Vall of Fotogramas rated the film 3 out of 5 stars, deeming it to be a "film that neither breaks the mould nor reinvents the genre", but which is easy to love and have fun with, commending the quartet of comedy aces formed by Malia, Pla, Abaitua, and Maruny.

== See also ==
- List of Spanish films of 2026
