= Sara's Notebook =

2018 film by Norberto López Amado

- Theatrical release poster
- Spanish: El cuaderno de Sara
- Directed by: Norberto López Amado
- Written by: Jorge Guerricaechevarría
- Produced by: Álvaro Augustin; Ghislain Barrois; Derrick Kibisi; Edmon Roch; Javier Ugarte
- Starring: Belén Rueda; Marian Álvarez; Manolo Cardona; Enrico Lo Verso; Marta Belaustegui; Iván Mendes
- Cinematography: David Omedes
- Edited by: Pablo Marchetto
- Music by: Julio de la Rosa
- Production companies: Ikiru Films; Mediaset España; Movistar+ Telecinco Cinema
- Distributed by: Buena Vista International
- Release dates: 31 January 2018 (Cine Capitol premiere); 2 February 2018 (Spain)
- Running time: 115 minutes
- Country: Spain
- Language: Spanish
- Budget: €1 million
- Box office: $6 million

Sara's Notebook (Spanish: El cuaderno de Sara) is a 2018 Spanish drama film directed by Norberto López Amado and written by Jorge Guerricaechevarría, about how Laura Alonso (Belén Rueda) searches for her missing sister in the Democratic Republic of Congo.

== Cast ==
- Belén Rueda as Laura
- Marian Álvarez as Sara
- Iván Mendes as Jamir
- Marta Belaustegui as Elsa.
- Enrico Lo Verso as Padre Salvio
- Manolo Cardona as Sergio
- Nick Devlin as Sven
- Florin Opritescu as Davor
- Alfredo Araoz as Cámara TV
- Armando Jerez as Sonidista TV
- Djédjé Apali as Battiste (as Djedje Apali)
- Malcolm Treviño-Sitté as Omar (as Malcolm T. Sitté)
- Bella Agossou as Masira
- María Luisa Mayo as Irene
- Ramón Barea as Padre Laura y Sara
- Astrid Jones as Lugarteniente
- Santiago Adán as Tom (as Santi Adán)

== Release ==
Following a pre-screening on January 31, 2018 at Madrid's Cine Capitol, the film was theatrically released in Spain on February 2, 2018, distributed by Buena Vista International. It was released on May 25, 2018 on Netflix streaming, although it will be removed from the catalog on May 26, 2023.

== See also ==
- List of Spanish films of 2018
