= Between Two Waters =

2018 film directed by Isaki Lacuesta

- Directed by: Isaki Lacuesta
- Written by: Isaki Lacuesta; Isa Campo; Fran Araújo
- Produced by: Paco Poch
- Starring: Israel Gómez Romero; Francisco José Gómez Romero
- Cinematography: Diego Dussuel
- Edited by: Sergi Dies; Domi Parra
- Music by: Raül Refree; Kiko Veneno
- Production companies: La Termita Films; Bteam Prods; All Go Movies; Mallerich Films Paco Poch; Bord Cadre Films; Studio Indie Productions
- Distributed by: BTeam Pictures
- Release date: 30 November 2018 (Spain)
- Running time: 136 minutes
- Countries: Spain; Switzerland; Romania
- Language: Spanish

Between Two Waters (Spanish: Entre dos aguas) is a 2018 Spanish-language docufiction drama film directed by Isaki Lacuesta, who co-wrote the screenplay with Isa Campo and Fran Araújo. It stars the brothers Israel Gómez Romero and Francisco José "Cheíto" Gómez Romero, revisiting the people whom Lacuesta had filmed as adolescents in The Legend of Time (2006). The film combines scripted fiction with elements drawn from the brothers' lives and was shot in and around San Fernando, Cádiz.

The film competed at the 66th San Sebastián International Film Festival, where it won the Golden Shell for best film and the SIGNIS Award. It subsequently won the Golden Astor for best film at the Mar del Plata International Film Festival, while Israel Gómez Romero received the festival's best actor award. At the 11th Gaudí Awards, it won seven awards, including Best Non-Catalan Language Film, Best Director and Best Actor.

== Plot ==
Isra and Cheíto are two Roma brothers from San Fernando who have followed different paths. Isra has served a prison sentence for drug dealing, while Cheíto has joined the Spanish Navy. After Isra is released and Cheíto returns from a lengthy mission, both men come home. Their reunion revives memories of their father's violent death when they were children.

Isra attempts to rebuild his relationship with his wife and three daughters and to earn a legal living in an area marked by unemployment and limited opportunities. Cheíto, meanwhile, tries to reconcile family life with the stability and absences that come with his naval career. The brothers' efforts to regain control of their lives bring them together again.

== Production ==
Between Two Waters grew out of Lacuesta's earlier film The Legend of Time, in which he had followed Isra and Cheíto as teenagers. Lacuesta remained in contact with the brothers and conceived the films as a possible long-term portrait of their lives. Although events and experiences from their surroundings informed the new film, Lacuesta described it as a fiction film whose scenes were staged and scripted to create a strongly realist effect.

Principal photography began on 14 August 2017 in San Fernando and nearby Rota, in the province of Cádiz. The production occupied a space between documentary portraiture and narrative fiction. It was shot on film rather than digitally, and includes footage from The Legend of Time to emphasize the passage of time.

The screenplay was written by Lacuesta, Campo and Araújo. The film was produced as a Spanish–Swiss–Romanian co-production by La Termita Films, Bteam Prods, All Go Movies, Mallerich Films Paco Poch, Bord Cadre Films and Studio Indie Productions. Diego Dussuel served as cinematographer, Sergi Dies and Domi Parra edited the film, and the score was composed by Kiko Veneno and Raül Refree.

== Release ==
The film was presented in the official competition of the 66th San Sebastián International Film Festival in September 2018. It was released theatrically in Spain by BTeam Pictures on 30 November 2018, with Filmax handling international sales. It was later selected for the Voices section of the International Film Festival Rotterdam in 2019.

== Reception ==
The film received praise for its naturalism and its treatment of the boundary between documentary and fiction. Alfonso Rivera of Cineuropa wrote that Lacuesta brought the audience close to the brothers without complacency and highlighted the screenplay's ability to leave room for humour, spontaneity and authenticity. Rivera nevertheless considered the film's length excessive.

In The Hollywood Reporter, Jonathan Holland described the film as a "striking, potently human" follow-up to The Legend of Time and praised its use of non-professional performers playing versions of themselves. Jordi Costa of El País praised the film's construction of a convincing illusion of life and its exploration of the tension between marginalisation and social integration. Carlos Boyero, also writing in El País, acknowledged the film's authenticity and the performances, but criticised its running time, repetition and the difficulty of understanding portions of the dialogue.

== Accolades ==
Award or festival	Category	Recipient(s)	Result	Ref.
66th San Sebastián International Film Festival	Golden Shell for Best Film	Between Two Waters	Won	
66th San Sebastián International Film Festival	SIGNIS Award	Between Two Waters	Won	
33rd Mar del Plata International Film Festival	Golden Astor for Best Film	Between Two Waters	Won	
33rd Mar del Plata International Film Festival	Best Actor	Israel Gómez Romero	Won	
33rd Goya Awards	Best Film	Between Two Waters	Nominated	
33rd Goya Awards	Best Director	Isaki Lacuesta	Nominated	
11th Gaudí Awards	Best Non-Catalan Language Film	Between Two Waters	Won	
11th Gaudí Awards	Best Director	Isaki Lacuesta	Won	
11th Gaudí Awards	Best Actor	Israel Gómez Romero	Won	
11th Gaudí Awards	Best Cinematography	Diego Dussuel	Won	
11th Gaudí Awards	Best Editing	Sergi Dies	Won	
11th Gaudí Awards	Best Original Score	Kiko Veneno and Raül Refree	Won	
11th Gaudí Awards	Best Sound	Alejandro Castillo and Amanda Villavieja	Won	
6th Feroz Awards	Special Award	Between Two Waters	Won	
