= Happy Sad (film) =

- Theatrical release poster
- Spanish: Alegría tristeza
- Directed by: Ibon Cormenzana
- Written by: Ibon Cormenzana; Jordi Vallejo
- Produced by: Ibon Cormenzana; Ignasi Estapé; Jérôme Vidal
- Starring: Roberto Álamo; Manuela Vellés; Pedro Casablanc; Carlos Bardem; Maggie Civantos; Claudia Placer
- Cinematography: Albert Pascual
- Edited by: David Gallart
- Music by: Lucas Vidal
- Production companies: Arcadia Motion Pictures; Samarcanda Films; Noodles Production
- Distributed by: Alfa Pictures
- Release dates: 11 November 2018 (Seville); 16 November 2018 (Spain)
- Countries: Spain; France
- Language: Spanish

Happy Sad (Spanish: Alegría tristeza, lit. 'Happiness sadness') is a 2018 psychological drama film directed by Ibon Cormenzana. Its cast features Roberto Álamo, Claudia Placer, and Manuela Vellés.

== Plot ==
After the tragic death of his wife Sandra, emotionally blocked firefighter Marcos becomes unable to identify emotions in others, starting a treatment with help from his daughter Lola and the psychologist Luna.

== Cast ==
- Roberto Álamo as Marcos
- Maggie Civantos as Sandra
- Claudia Placer as Lola
- Manuela Vellés as Luna
- Pedro Casablanc as Doctor Durán
- Andrés Gertrúdix
- Carlos Bardem as Pedro López

== Production ==
The film was produced by Arcadia Motion Pictures and Samarcanda Films alongside Noodles Production, and it had the participation of TV3 and Movistar+. It was lensed by Albert Pascual, who used an ARRI Alexa Mini with Cooke S2/S3 lenses. Shooting locations included Madrid and Pamplona.

== Release ==
The film was presented at the Seville European Film Festival on 11 November 2018. Distributed by Alfa Pictures, it was released theatrically in Spain on 16 November 2018.

== Reception ==
Alfonso Rivera of Cineuropa wrote that the film "could have flown so much higher and gone so much further in its commitment to defend living life to the fullest".

Roger Salvans Borràs of Fotogramas rated the film 3 out of 5 stars, positively citing its "stupendous" cast, while negatively mentioning some overly forced plot twists.

Javier Ocaña of El País assessed that the "constant drifts in the film's personality end up eroding a good initial idea" that "falls apart to a great extent in [the film's] penultimate stretch".

Sergio F. Pinilla of Cinemanía rated the film 3½ out of 5 stars underscoring that "Cormenzana unveils his emotional cards with a stellar cast" in the verdict.

== Accolades ==
Year	Award	Category	Nominee(s)	Result	Ref.
2019	28th Actors and Actresses Union Awards	Best Film Actor in a Minor Role	Carlos Bardem	Nominated	

== See also ==
- List of Spanish films of 2018
