= Quién te cantará =

- Film poster
- Directed by: Carlos Vermut
- Written by: Carlos Vermut
- Produced by: Enrique López Lavigne
- Starring: Najwa Nimri; Eva Llorach; Carme Elías; Natalia de Molina
- Cinematography: Eduard Grau
- Edited by: Marta Velasco
- Music by: Alberto Iglesias
- Production companies: Apache Films; Áralan Films; Les Films du Worso
- Release dates: 8 September 2018 (TIFF); 26 October 2018 (Spain)
- Running time: 125 minutes
- Countries: Spain; France
- Language: Spanish

Quién te cantará (Spanish for 'Who will sing to you') is a 2018 Spanish-French drama film written and directed by Carlos Vermut, starring Najwa Nimri and Eva Llorach.

The film was nominated for seven Goya Awards with Llorach winning the award for Best New Actress.

== Plot ==
When Lila, a celebrity singer with amnesia forgets how to act, a superfan named Violeta steps in to teach Lila how to be Lila once again.

== Cast ==
- Najwa Nimri as Lila Cassen
- Eva Llorach as Violeta
- Carme Elías as Blanca
- Natalia de Molina as Marta
- Julián Villagrán as Nicolás
- Carolina Yuste as Ana
- Leticia Dolera as Lili Cassen

== Production ==
A Spain-France co-production by Apache Films, Áralan Films and Les Films du Worso, the film also had the participation of TVE, Canal Sur and Vodafone, and support from ICAA, ICO and Junta de Andalucía. Shooting locations included the provinces of Cádiz and Málaga.

== Release ==
The film was presented at the 2018 Toronto International Film Festival. It was also showcased at the 66th San Sebastián International Film Festival later in the month. It was released theatrically in Spain on 26 October 2018.

== Reception ==
Quién te cantará received positive reviews from film critics. It holds an 85% approval rating on review aggregator website Rotten Tomatoes, based on 13 reviews with an average rating of 7.4/10.

Jonathan Holland of The Hollywood Reporter underscored the film to be "a smart, moving homage to fandom".

Shelagh Rowan-Legg of ScreenAnarchy deemed the film to be "a mesmerizing story of the burden of fame, the bonds between strangers, the price of love, and the reflections we see and do not see in each other and ourselves".

== Accolades ==
Year	Award	Category	Nominee(s)	Result	Ref.
2018	66th San Sebastián International Film Festival	Feroz Zinemaldia Award		Won	
2019	24th Forqué Awards	Best Actress in a Film	Eva Llorach	Won	
2019	6th Feroz Awards	Best Drama Film		Nominated	
2019	6th Feroz Awards	Best Director	Carlos Vermut	Nominated	
2019	6th Feroz Awards	Best Screenplay	Carlos Vermut	Nominated	
2019	6th Feroz Awards	Best Actress in a Film	Eva Llorach	Won	
2019	6th Feroz Awards	Best Supporting Actress	Natalia de Molina	Nominated	
2019	6th Feroz Awards	Best Original Soundtrack	Alberto Iglesias	Won	
2019	6th Feroz Awards	Best Trailer		Won	
2019	6th Feroz Awards	Best Film Poster		Won	
2019	11th Gaudí Awards	Best Actress	Carme Elías	Nominated	
2019	11th Gaudí Awards	Best Cinematography	Eduard Grau	Nominated	
2019	11th Gaudí Awards	Best Art Direction	Laia Ateca	Nominated	
2019	33rd Goya Awards	Best Actress	Najwa Nimri	Nominated	
2019	33rd Goya Awards	Best Supporting Actress	Natalia de Molina	Nominated	
2019	33rd Goya Awards	Best New Actress	Eva Llorach	Won	
2019	33rd Goya Awards	Best Cinematography	Eduard Grau	Nominated	
2019	33rd Goya Awards	Best Sound	Daniel de Zayas, Eduardo Castro, Mario González	Nominated	
2019	33rd Goya Awards	Best Costume Design	Ana López Cobos	Nominated	
2019	33rd Goya Awards	Best Makeup and Hairstyles	Rafael Mora, Anabel Beato	Nominated	
2019	28th Actors and Actresses Union Awards	Best New Actress	Eva Llorach	Won	

== See also ==
- List of Spanish films of 2018
- List of French films of 2018
