= Not the End =

- Theatrical release poster
- Spanish: Sin fin
- Directed by: César Esteban Alenda; José Esteban Alenda
- Screenplay by: César Esteban Alenda; José Esteban Alenda
- Based on: Not the End (short film)
- Starring: María León; Javier Rey; Juan Carlos Sánchez; Paco Ochoa; Mari Paz Sayago
- Cinematography: Ángel Amorós
- Edited by: César Esteban Alenda
- Music by: Sergio de la Puente
- Production companies: Producciones Transatlánticas; Solita Films; Elamedia
- Distributed by: Filmax
- Release dates: 19 April 2018 (Málaga); 31 October 2018 (Spain)
- Country: Spain
- Language: Spanish

Not the End (Spanish: Sin fin, lit. 'Without End') is a 2018 Spanish romantic fantasy drama film directed by César Esteban Alenda and José Esteban Alenda based on the 2014 short film of the same name which stars María León and Javier Rey.

== Plot ==
A scientist decides to travel back in time to rewrite life with his significant other back when they met for the first time.

== Cast ==
- Javier Rey as Javier
- María León as María
- Juan Carlos Sánchez
- Paco Ochoa
- Mari Paz Sayago

== Production ==
The film is a Producciones Transatlánticas, Solita Films, and Elamedia production. It had backing and funding from TVE, Canal Sur, ICAA, Junta de Andalucía, the Madrid regional administration, and CreaSGR. Shooting locations included Conil de la Frontera.

== Release ==
The film was presented at the Málaga Film Festival on 19 April 2018. Distributed by Filmax, it was released theatrically in Spain on 31 October 2018.

== Reception ==
Beatriz Martínez Gómez of Fotogramas rated the film 3 out of 5 stars, highlighting the chemistry between Rey and León as the best thing about the film.

Luis Martínez of El Mundo rated the film 3 out of 5 stars, highlighting the "brilliant" performances by León and Rey as the best thing about the film.

Jordi Costa of El País wrote that "at times the border between the sensitive and the corny becomes dilluted", otherwise considering that "the elegance of the denouement partially compensates for the [film's] falterings".

== Accolades ==
Year	Award	Category	Nominee(s)	Result	Ref.
2018	21st Málaga Film Festival	Silver Biznaga for Best Actor	Javier Rey	Won	
2019	6th Feroz Awards	Best Actor in a Film	Javier Rey	Nominated	
2019	33rd Goya Awards	Best New Director	César Esteban Alenda, José Esteban Alenda	Nominated	

== See also ==
- List of Spanish films of 2018
