= Oriol Pla =

Spanish actor

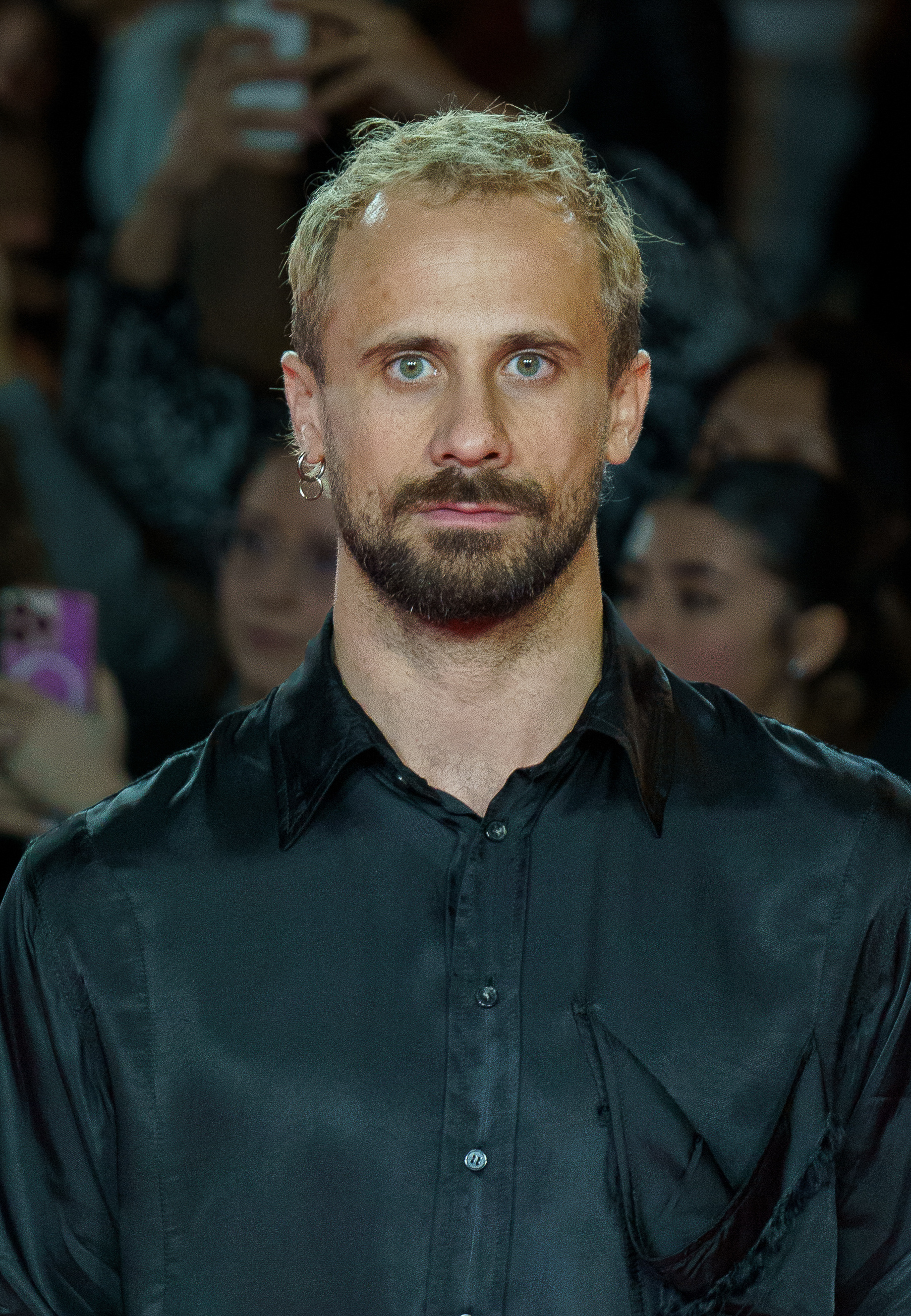
- Pla in 2025
- Born: Oriol Pla Solina; 1993 (age 32–33); Barcelona, Catalonia, Spain
- Occupations: Actor; clown

Oriol Pla Solina (born 1993) is a Spanish actor from Catalonia.

== Biography ==
Oriol Pla Solina was born in Barcelona in 1993, son to Quimet Pla (founding member of Comediants) and Núria Solina (founding member of Circ Cric). He made his debut onstage at age 6 in Quatre fustes i un paper, later founding his own clown group 'Espai Dual'. In his early television career, he featured in TV3 shows such as El cor de la ciutat, the TV-movie Ebre, del bressol a la batalla or Merlí.

In 2018, he starred in the miniseries What the Future Holds, portraying Justo Gil, an ambitious young go-getter arriving in late-Francoist Barcelona ready to take on the world.

In December 2025, Oriol Pla and his family (Quimet Pla, Núria Solina, and Diana Pla) were announced as recipients of the Gold Medal of Merit in the Fine Arts.

== Filmography ==
=== Television ===
Year	Title	Role	Notes	Ref
2008	El cor de la ciutat	Juli		
2015–17	Merlí	Òscar Rubio		
2016	Ebre, del bressol a la batalla	Pere Puig	TV movie	
2018	El día de mañana (What the Future Holds)	Justo Gil		
2020–21	Dime quién soy (Dime Quién Soy: Mistress of War)	Pierre Comte		
2024	Yo, adicto (I, Addict)	Javier Giner		

=== Film ===
Key
†	Denotes films that have not yet been released

Year	Title	Role	Notes	Ref
2014	Tots els camins de Déu (The Ways of Man)			
2015	Truman	Nico		
2017	Incerta glòria (Uncertain Glory)	Juli Soleràs		
2017	No sé decir adiós (Can't Say Goodbye)			
2018	Petra	Pau		
2022	Girasoles silvestres (Wild Flowers)	Òscar		
2023	Creatura	Marcel		
2024	Salve Maria	Nico		
2025	Esmorza amb mi (Join Me for Breakfast)	Magma		
2026	Esta soledad (This Solitude)	Leo		
2026	Citas: la película (Dating in Barcelona)	Dani		
TBA	La Regenta †	Magistral Fermín de Pas		

== Accolades ==
Year	Award	Category	Work	Result	Ref.
2018	5th Feroz Awards	Best Supporting Actor in a Film	Uncertain Glory	Nominated	
2018	10th Gaudí Awards	Best Supporting Actor	Uncertain Glory	Won	
2018	20th Iris Awards	Best TV Actor	What the Future Holds	Nominated	
2018	65th Ondas Awards	Best TV Actor	What the Future Holds	Won	
2019	6th Feroz Awards	Best Main Actor in a Series	What the Future Holds	Nominated	
2019	11th Gaudí Awards	Best Supporting Actor	Petra	Won	
2019	28th Actors and Actresses Union Awards	Best Film Actor in a Minor Role	Petra	Nominated	
2022	15th Gaudí Awards	Best Actor	Wild Flowers	Nominated	
2022	10th Feroz Awards	Best Supporting Actor in a Film	Wild Flowers	Nominated	
2024	11th Feroz Awards	Best Supporting Actor in a Film	Creatura	Nominated	
2024	30th Forqué Awards	Best Actor in a Series	I, Addict	Nominated	
2025	17th Gaudí Awards	Best Supporting Actor	Salve Maria	Nominated	
2025	12th Feroz Awards	Best Main Actor in a Series	I, Addict	Won	
2025	33rd Actors and Actresses Union Awards	Best Television Actor in a Leading Role	I, Addict	Won	
2025	53rd International Emmy Awards	Best Performance by an Actor	I, Addict	Won	
2026	27th Iris Awards	Best Actor	I, Addict	Nominated	

== See also ==
- List of International Emmy Award winners
