= Bárbara Lennie =

Spanish actress (born 1984)

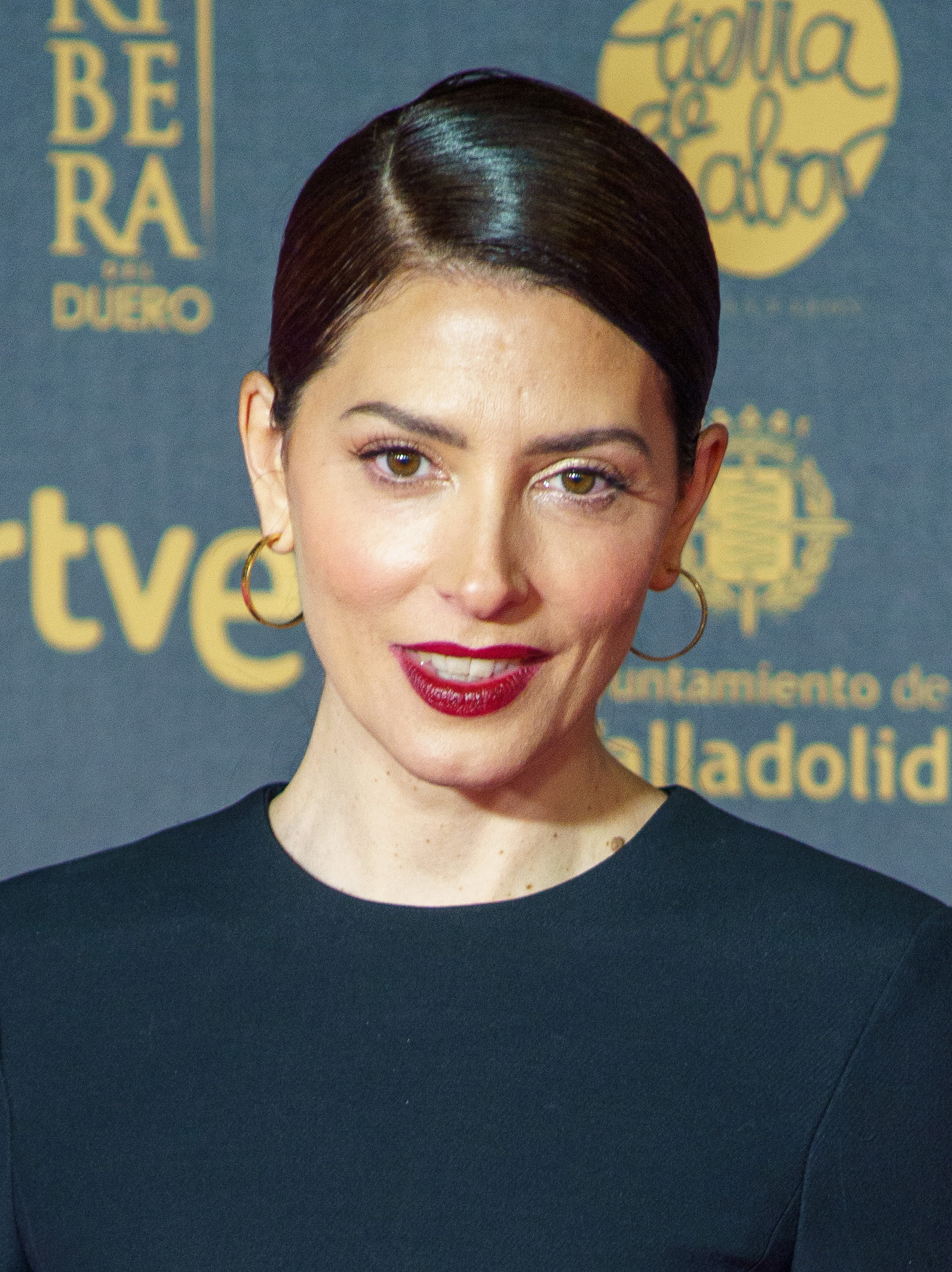
- Lennie in 2024
- Born: Bárbara Lennie Holguín; 20 April 1984 (age 42); Madrid, Spain
- Education: RESAD
- Occupation: Actress
- Years active: 2001–present
- Children: 1

Bárbara Lennie Holguín (born 20 April 1984) is a Spanish actress, hailed as an indie cinema star. She won the Goya Award for Best Actress for her performance in the 2014 neo-noir drama Magical Girl, also scooping nominations for Obaba (New Actress), El niño (Supporting Actress), María (and Everybody Else) (Best Actress), and God's Crooked Lines (Best Actress).

== Biography ==
Born in Madrid on 20 April 1984, she is of Argentine and Irish descent. She moved as a toddler with her family from the Prosperidad neighborhood to Buenos Aires, where she lived for 6 years before returning to Madrid circa 1990. She made her feature film debut at age 15 in No Pain, No Gain. She graduated from the Real Escuela Superior de Arte Dramático (RESAD), after which she started working professionally as an actress. Her credits include Magical Girl, Obaba and El Niño and the television series Isabel and El incidente.

She gave birth to her first child, a daughter, with her partner Diego Postigo in 2022.

== Filmography ==
=== Film ===
Year	Title	Role	Notes	Ref.
2001	Más pena que gloria (No Pain, No Gain)	Gloria		
2005	Obaba	Lourdes		
2006	La bicicleta (The Bicycle)	Julia		
2006	Mujeres en el parque (Women in the Park)	Mónica		
2007	Todos los días son tuyos (All Days Are Yours)	María		
2007	Las 13 rosas (13 Roses)	Dionisia		
2009	Los condenados (The Damned)	Silvia		
2010	Todas las canciones hablan de mí (Every Song Is About Me)	Andrea		
2011	La piel que habito (The Skin I Live In)	Cristina		
2012	Dictado (Childish Games)	Laura		
2012	Miel de naranjas (Orange Honey)	Ana		
2014	Stella cadente (Falling Star)	Maria Vittoria		
2014	El Niño	Eva		
2014	Magical Girl	Bárbara		
2014	Murieron por encima de sus posibilidades (Dying Beyond Their Means)			
2015	El apóstata (The Apostate)	Maite		
2016	María (y los demás) (María (and Everybody Else))	María		
2016	Contratiempo (The Invisible Guest)	Laura Vidal		
2016	Las furias (The Furies)	Julia		
2017	Una especie de familia (A Sort of Family)	Malena		
2017	Oro (Gold)	Doña Ana		
2018	La enfermedad del domingo (Sunday's Illness)	Chiara		
2018	Todos lo saben (Everybody Knows)	Bea		
2018	Petra	Petra		
2018	El reino (The Realm)	Amaia Marín		
2022	El agua (The Water)	Isabella		
2022	El suplente (The Substitute)	Mariela		
2022	Los renglones torcidos de Dios (God's Crooked Lines)	Alice Gould		
2023	Las chicas están bien (The Girls Are Alright)	Barbara		
2024	Verano en diciembre (Family Affairs)	Carmen		
2025	Los Tigres	Estrella		
2026	Amarga Navidad (Bitter Christmas)	Elsa		

=== Television ===
Year	Title	Role	Notes	Ref.
2007–08	Cuenta atrás (Countdown)	Leo	Main	
2009–10	Amar en tiempos revueltos	Rosa Fernández / Mónica Cortés	Main. Season 5	
2009	Águila Roja (Red Eagle)	Cristina Hernando	Guest	
2011–13	Isabel	Juana de Avis		
2013	Balas perdidas (Lost Bullets)	Katie	TV pilot	
2017	El incidente (The Incident)	Ana	Main	
2020	Escenario 0 (''Stage 0)	Barbara	Episode: "Hermanas"	
2020	El desorden que dejas (The Mess You Leave Behind)	Viruca	Main	

== Accolades ==
Year	Award	Category	Work	Result	Ref.
2006	61st CEC Medals	Best New Artist	Obaba	Nominated	
2006	20th Goya Awards	Best New Actress	Obaba	Nominated	
2010	54th Sant Jordi Awards	Best Spanish Actress	The Damned	Won	
2011	20th Actors and Actresses Union Awards	Best New Actress	La función por hacer	Won	
2013	22nd Actors and Actresses Union Awards	Best Television Actress in a Secondary Role	Isabel	Nominated	
2015	20th Forqué Awards	Best Actress	Magical Girl	Won	
2015	7th Gaudí Awards	Best Supporting Actress	El niño	Won	
2015	7th Gaudí Awards	Best Actress	Falling Star	Nominated	
2015	70th CEC Medals	Best Actress	Magical Girl	Won	
2015	70th CEC Medals	Best Supporting Actress	El Niño	Nominated	
2015	2nd Feroz Awards	Best Main Actress in a Film	Magical Girl	Won	
2015	29th Goya Awards	Best Actress	Magical Girl	Won	
2015	29th Goya Awards	Best Supporting Actress	El niño	Nominated	
2015	65th Fotogramas de Plata	Best Movie Actress	Magical Girl	Won	
2015	2nd Fénix Awards	Best Actress	Magical Girl	Nominated	
2016	25th Actors and Actresses Union Awards	Best Stage Actress in a Leading Role	La clausura del amor	Won	
2017	22nd Forqué Awards	Best Actress	María (and Everybody Else)	Nominated	
2017	4th Feroz Awards	Best Main Actress in a Film	María (and Everybody Else)	Won	
2017	72nd CEC Medals	Best Actress	María (and Everybody Else)	Nominated	
2017	31st Goya Awards	Best Actress	María (and Everybody Else)	Nominated	
2017	15th Mestre Mateo Awards	Best Actress	María (and Everybody Else)	Won	
2017	4th Fénix Awards	Best Actress	María (and Everybody Else)	Nominated	
2018	66th Silver Condor Awards	Best Actress	A Sort of Family	Nominated	
2018	12th Sur Awards	Best Actress	A Sort of Family	Nominated	
2018	5th Fénix Awards	Best Actress	A Sort of Family	Nominated	
2018	31st European Film Awards	Best Actress	Petra	Nominated	
2019	24th Forqué Awards	Best Actress	Petra	Nominated	
2019	6th Feroz Awards	Best Main Actress in a Film	Petra	Nominated	
2019	6th Feroz Awards	Best Supporting Actress in a Film	Everybody Knows	Nominated	
2019	11th Gaudí Awards	Best Actress	Petra	Nominated	
2019	74th CEC Awards	Best Actress	Petra	Nominated	
2019	74th CEC Awards	Best Supporting Actress	Everybody Knows	Nominated	
2019	28th Actors and Actresses Union Awards	Best Film Actress in a Leading Role	Sunday's Illness	Nominated	
2019	28th Actors and Actresses Union Awards	Best Stage Actress in a Leading Role	El tratamiento	Nominated	
2023	15th Gaudí Awards	Best Actress	God's Crooked Lines	Nominated	
2023	78th CEC Medals	Best Supporting Actress	The Water	Nominated	
2023	37th Goya Awards	Best Actress	God's Crooked Lines	Nominated	
2026	81st CEC Medals	Best Actress	Los Tigres	Nominated	
