= 53 Sundays =

2026 Spanish film

- Promotional release poster
- Spanish: 53 domingos
- Directed by: Cesc Gay
- Screenplay by: Cesc Gay
- Based on: 53 diumenges by Cesc Gay
- Starring: Javier Cámara; Carmen Machi; Javier Gutiérrez; Alexandra Jiménez
- Cinematography: Andreu Rebés
- Music by: Arnau Bataller
- Production company: Imposible Films
- Distributed by: Netflix
- Release date: 27 March 2026
- Country: Spain
- Language: Spanish

53 Sundays (Spanish: 53 domingos) is a 2026 Spanish comedy-drama film written and directed by Cesc Gay based on his own play 53 diumenges. It stars Javier Cámara, Carmen Machi, Javier Gutiérrez, and Alexandra Jiménez.

== Plot ==
Three siblings gather in a family meeting to decide what to do with their 86-year-old father.

== Cast ==
- Carmen Machi as Natalia
- Javier Cámara as Julián
- Javier Gutiérrez as Víctor
- Alexandra Jiménez as Carol

== Production ==
Netflix showcased the project at the 72nd San Sebastián International Film Festival in September 2024. An Imposible Films production, the film is an adaptation of Gay's play 53 diumenges, that premiered in 2020 at the Teatre Romea. Shooting primarily took place in the Netflix production hub in Tres Cantos as well as in several locations in the centre of Madrid.

Andreu Rebés worked as cinematographer, using an Arri Alexa 35 camera and Leica Summilux C lenses. Arnau Bataller was the composer.

== Release ==
Netflix is set to release the film on 27 March 2026.

== Reception ==
Enid Román Almansa of Cinemanía rated the film 4 out of 5 stars, welcoming how Gay "wonderfully" turns a trite premise (the story of three completely different siblings) "into something fresh and really fun".

== See also ==
- List of Spanish films of 2026
