= Ana by Day =

- Theatrical release poster
- Spanish: Ana de día
- Directed by: Andrea Jaurrieta
- Starring: Ingrid García-Jonsson; Mona Martínez; Álvaro Ogalla; Fernando Albizu; María José Alfonso; Irene Ruiz
- Cinematography: Juli Carné Martorell
- Edited by: Miguel A. Trudu
- Music by: Aurélio Edler-Copes
- Production companies: Andrea Jaurrieta PC; No hay banda; Pomme Hurlante Films
- Distributed by: Syldavia Cinema
- Release dates: 14 April 2018 (Málaga); 9 November 2018 (Spain)
- Countries: Spain; France
- Language: Spanish

Ana by Day (Spanish: Ana de día) is a 2018 psychological drama film directed by Andrea Jaurrieta in her directorial debut feature which stars Ingrid García-Jonsson.

== Plot ==
A middle-class woman about the get married (Ana) finds out that a double has usurped her life, so she creates a new personality as a dancer named Nina, exploring a decadent Madrid.

== Cast ==
- Ingrid García-Jonsson as Ana / Nina
- Mona Martínez as Sole
- Álvaro Ogalla as Marcelo
- Fernando Albizu as maestro de cabaret
- María José Alfonso as madame Lacroix
- Irene Ruiz

== Production ==
Produced by Andrea Jaurrieta PC alongside No hay banda and Pomme Hurlante Films, the film completed its financial backing via a crowdfunding campaign. Media Luna acquired international rights to the film excluding Spain and France.

== Release ==
The film was presented on 14 April 2018 at the Málaga Film Festival. Distributed by Syldavia Cinema, the film was released theatrically in Spain on 9 November 2018.

== Reception ==
Beatriz Martínez of Fotogramas highlighted the sense of "a voice with style and personality" behind the camera as the best thing about the film, otherwise hampered by "certain tendency to self-absorption and posturing".

Alberto Luchini of El Mundo rated the "haunting" debut film 2 out of 5 stars, assessing that it alternates hits (such as the protagonist's ambiguous character building) with misses (such as the "failed sordidness" about the cabaret setting).

== Accolades ==
Year	Award	Category	Nominee(s)	Result	Ref.
2019	6th Feroz Awards	Best Film Poster	Bárbara Magdalena	Nominated	
2019	33rd Goya Awards	Best New Director	Andrea Jaurrieta	Nominated	

== See also ==
- List of Spanish films of 2018
