= Go Team! =

- Promotional release poster
- Spanish: Gracias, equipo
- Directed by: Diego Núñez Irigoyen
- Screenplay by: Cristóbal Garrido; Adolfo Valor
- Starring: Alexandra Jiménez; Maribel Verdú; Raúl Tejón; Blanca Martínez; Pedro Casablanc
- Cinematography: Maria Codina
- Music by: Arnau Bataller
- Production company: Zeta Studios
- Distributed by: Netflix
- Release date: 11 September 2026
- Country: Spain
- Language: Spanish

Go Team! (Spanish: Gracias, equipo) is an upcoming Spanish black comedy film directed by Diego Núñez Irigoyen and written by Cristóbal Garrido and Adolfo Valor. It features Alexandra Jiménez, Maribel Verdú, Raúl Tejón, Blanca Martínez, and Pedro Casablanc.

== Plot ==
'Tío Mochales', once a leading cheese company in Spain, is organizing a team building activity in the countryside but as the fact that layoffs are being raffled off comes to light, the getaway turns into a battle.

== Cast ==
- Alexandra Jiménez as Olga
- Maribel Verdú as Pepa
- Raúl Tejón as Marco
- Pedro Casablanc as Domingo
- Ismael Fritschi
- Blanca Martínez
- Víctor Rebull as Sergio
- Saturnino García as Aldo Mochales
- Pepe Viyuela

== Production ==
The film is a Zeta Studios production. Maria Codina worked as director of photography. Principal photography started in September 2025 in Madrid. Arnau Bataller scored the film.

== Release ==
The film is scheduled to be released on Netflix on 11 September 2026.

== Reception ==
Raquel Hernández Luján of HobbyConsolas gave the film a 70-point score, declaring it "a corporate satire that is less harmless than it seems—one that entertains, amuses, and packs a punch".

== See also ==
- List of Spanish films of 2026
