= You Shall Not Sleep =

2018 horror film

- Promotional release poster
- Spanish: No dormirás
- Directed by: Gustavo Hernández
- Screenplay by: Juma Fodde
- Starring: Belén Rueda; Eva de Dominici; Natalia de Molina; Germán Palacios; Eugenia Tobal; Juan Guilera
- Cinematography: Guillermo Nieto
- Edited by: Pablo Zumárraga
- Production companies: Pampa Films; Gloriamundi Producciones; White Films AIE; Bowfinger International Pictures; Tandem Films; Mother Superior
- Distributed by: 20th Century Fox (uy/ar); Filmax (es)
- Release dates: 11 January 2018 (Uruguay and Argentina); 15 June 2018 (Spain)
- Countries: Spain; Argentina; Uruguay
- Language: Spanish

You Shall Not Sleep (Spanish: No dormirás) is a 2018 horror thriller film directed by Gustavo Hernández. An international co-production of Spain, Argentina and Uruguay, the film stars Belén Rueda and Eva de Dominici.

== Plot ==
Set in the 1980s, the plot follows Bianca, an actress joining a theatre group led by Alma Böhn that is preparing a stage play employing experimental methods pertaining long sleepless periods to unlock higher degrees of perception. So Bianca goes to an abandoned psychiatric hospital, vying for the lead role with Ceci.

== Cast ==
- Belén Rueda as Alma Böhn
- Eva de Dominici as Bianca
- Natalia de Molina as Ceci
- María Zabay as Marlene
- Eugenia Tobal as Sara
- Germán Palacios as Krosso
- Juan Guilera as Fonzo
- Miguel Ángel Maciel

== Production ==
The screenplay was penned by Juma Fodde. A co-production among companies from Argentina, Spain and Uruguay, the film was produced by Pampa Films, Gloriamundi Producciones; White Films AIE, Bowfinger International Pictures, Tandem Films and Mother Superior.

== Release ==
Distributed by 20th Century Fox, the film was theatrically released in Uruguay on 11 January 2018. After screening at the Málaga Film Festival on 15 April 2018, the film was theatrically released in Spain on 15 June 2018, distributed by Filmax.

== Reception ==
Ezequiel Boetti of Página|12 wrote that the film features a "well-achieved" ominous atmosphere in its first half, but later brings an ending that reduces the film's dramatic power to turn it into just "another story of traumatized ghosts with a desire for revenge".

Dennis Harvey of Variety considered the film to be "too glossy, contrived, and dependent on rote jump scares to raise much of a fright", likewise featuring an "uninspired, workmanlike execution".

Andrea G. Bermejo rated the film 2½ out of 5 stars, summing it up to be "a virtuously directed compendium of clichés".

Beatriz Martínez of Fotogramas deemed the film to be "a great piece of psychological horror", highlighting the film's "hallucinogenic atmosphere", the director's work and the performances of Eva de Dominici, Belén Rueda and Natalia de Molina, while citing the "somewhat confusing" climax as a negative point.

Francisco Griñán of Diario Sur wrote that the film "has the resources, the mystery and the goal of delighting genre lovers", but not the ambition to transgress the genre rules.

Raquel Hernández Luján of HobbyConsolas scored 58 out of 100 points ("so-so") highlighting the first hour, displaying "brilliant ideas" and actresses "fully involved in their roles", especially Natalia de Molina, while decrying the badly resolved last part, "nearing on the laughable" and the grotesque.

== Accolades ==
Year	Award	Category	Nominee(s)	Result	Ref.
2018	21st Málaga Film Festival	Silver Biznaga for Best Cinematography	Guillermo Nieto	Won	
2018	21st Málaga Film Festival	Silver Biznaga for Best Editing	Pablo Zumárraga	Won	
2019	28th Actors and Actresses Union Awards	Best Actress in an International Production	Belén Rueda	Nominated	
2019	28th Actors and Actresses Union Awards	Best Actress in an International Production	Natalia de Molina	Nominated	

== See also ==
- List of Spanish films of 2018
- List of Argentine films of 2018
