= Unbridled (2018 film) =

- Theatrical release poster
- Spanish: Animales sin collar
- Directed by: Jota Linares
- Screenplay by: Jota Linares
- Based on: A Doll's House by Henrik Ibsen
- Produced by: Beatriz Bodegas
- Starring: Natalia de Molina; Daniel Grao; Natalia Mateo; Ignacio Mateos; Borja Luna; Mario Tardón; Mariana Cordero
- Production companies: La Canica Films; Animales sin collar AIE; Palomar SpA
- Distributed by: eOne Films Spain
- Release date: 19 October 2018 (Spain)
- Countries: Spain; Italy
- Language: Spanish

Unbridled (Spanish: Animales sin collar, lit. 'Animals without collars') is a 2018 Spanish-Italian thriller film directed by Jota Linares in his feature film debut which stars Natalia de Molina alongside Daniel Grao. It is a sort of transfer of Henrik Ibsen's A Doll's House to a contemporary Andalusian setting.

== Plot ==
Set in Andalusia, the plot concerns about the arrival to regional power of Abel, a fresh face with a modest background, helming the up-and-coming political party Pueblo Unido. Against the backdrop of Abel's imminent investiture, a loan taken out in the past by Abel's wife Nora to help her husband without consulting with him, comes to haunt her whilst a person from their past, Víctor (the privileged son of a corrupt former Junta de Andalucía high-ranking official and former acquaintance of the couple) comes into action.

== Cast ==
- Natalia de Molina as Nora
- Daniel Grao as Abel
- Natalia Mateo as Virginia
- Ignacio Mateos as Víctor
- Borja Luna as Félix
- Mariana Cordero
- Beatriz Arjona
- Mario Tardón

== Production ==
A Spanish-Italian co-production, the film was produced by La Canica Films and Animales sin collar AIE alongside Palomar SpA, with the participation of Netflix, RTVE, Movistar+ and Film Factory. It also had support from ICAA and collaboration with CreaSGR. Shooting locations included Seville and Carmona.

== Release ==
Distributed by eOne Films Spain, the film was theatrically released in Spain on 19 October 2018.

== Reception ==
Sergio F. Pinilla of Cinemanía rated the film 3 out of 5 stars, deeming it to display "character, an opportune cast and a few too many lines of dialogue".

Federico Marín Bellón of ABC rated the film 4 out of 5 stars, considering that "the sex and violence, not at all explicit, add forcefulness to the good decisions of the director and screenwriter".

Beatriz Martínez of Fotogramas rated the film 3 out of 5 stars highlighting the performances, particularly the ones of Natalia de Molina and Ignacio Mateos, while negatively assessing the film's lack of "forcefulness".

== Accolades ==
Year	Award	Category	Nominee(s)	Result	Ref.
2019	6th Feroz Awards	Best Supporting Actor	Ignacio Mateos	Nominated	
2019	28th Actors and Actresses Union Awards	Best New Actor	Borja Luna	Nominated	

== See also ==
- List of Spanish films of 2018
