= Everybody Knows (film) =

- Theatrical release poster
- Spanish: Todos lo saben
- Directed by: Asghar Farhadi
- Written by: Asghar Farhadi
- Produced by: Alexandre Mallet-Guy; Álvaro Longoria
- Starring: Javier Bardem; Penélope Cruz; Ricardo Darín; Bárbara Lennie
- Cinematography: José Luis Alcaine
- Edited by: Hayedeh Safiyari
- Music by: Javier Limón
- Production companies: Memento Films; Morena Films; Lucky Red
- Distributed by: Focus Features and Universal Pictures (Spain); Memento Films (France); Lucky Red (Italy)
- Release dates: 8 May 2018 (Cannes); 8 September 2018 (TIFF); 14 September 2018 (Spain)
- Running time: 132 minutes
- Countries: Spain; France; Italy
- Language: Spanish
- Budget: $11.8 million
- Box office: $19.2 million

Everybody Knows (Spanish: Todos lo saben) is a 2018 Spanish-language mystery/crime drama film written and directed by Iranian filmmaker Asghar Farhadi, and starring Javier Bardem, Penélope Cruz and Ricardo Darín. The film was selected to open the 2018 Cannes Film Festival in competition and was released in Spain on 14 September 2018. It was released in the United States on 8 February 2019. It received positive reviews from critics.

== Plot ==
The story follows Laura, a Spanish woman living in Buenos Aires, who returns with her teenage daughter Irene and young son Diego to her small hometown just outside Madrid for her younger sister's wedding. Laura runs into her old friend Paco in the town square while Irene flirts with a local teenage boy named Felipe. After dancing with Felipe at the wedding reception, Irene complains that she does not feel well and goes upstairs to sleep. Later that night, Laura goes to check on Irene only to find she is missing. She receives a text message from kidnappers urging the family to pay a large sum or they will kill Irene.

The family decides not to involve the local police for Irene's safety, as the kidnappers will kill Irene if the police get close. Laura receives a text message demanding €300,000 against the release of her daughter. Chaos ensues as the family scrambles to raise the money. During a heated confrontation with Laura's father Antonio, Paco learns that some family members believe he "owes" them money, as the land Paco's vineyards were built on was sold to him by Laura at below market rate because he was the child of the family's servants. Laura's brother-in-law, Fernando, calms the situation and brings in his friend Jorge, a retired police officer, for consultation. During a private conversation, Jorge tells Laura that she should include members of her family on her suspect list, including her husband. Desperate to help, Paco considers selling his lands to a business partner so he can pay Irene's ransom but his wife Bea advises against it. She reveals that she has been receiving the same text messages as Laura on her phone.

Laura's husband, Alejandro, is informed of the kidnapping and arrives in town. He receives a cold welcome by Laura's family before going with Laura, Paco, and Fernando to meet Jorge, who asks to talk to Alejandro alone. Alejandro becomes very upset when Jorge mentions that Laura discussed his past problems with alcoholism and his ongoing bankruptcy. Enraged by how a stranger knows this information, Alejandro leaves with Laura and they argue about the best course of action. Laura confesses to Paco that Irene is his biological daughter, conceived sixteen years prior during Laura's trip to her hometown shortly after she and Alejandro married. Shocked by this information, Paco readies to sell his estate, but Bea angrily refutes Laura's claim. She believes Laura is lying about Irene's paternity and might be involved in the kidnapping herself in order to get money out of Paco. He leaves the house anyway and comes back hours later with a duffel bag containing the ransom money. After examining Irene's upstairs room, Jorge tells Alejandro and Laura that whoever kidnapped Irene knew that Paco was her father. During a conversation with Fernando, Alejandro learns that the whole family, along with some of the townsfolk, know that Irene is not his biological daughter because of her resemblance to Paco.

That night, Laura's niece Rocío sneaks out of the house and travels to an abandoned, run-down building on the outskirts of the town. Once there, she meets with her estranged husband Gabriel and his accomplice Luis. It is revealed that all three of them orchestrated Irene's kidnapping and that Gabriel has been sending the ransom messages to Laura. Luis admits that he is the one who has been sending the same ransom messages to Bea, unbeknownst to Gabriel. This angers Gabriel and prompts a crying Rocío to beg for her husband to let Irene go; their collective actions have deviated too far from the original plan and caused irreparable damage. Despite Luis's protests, Gabriel agrees to let Irene go at dawn. Rocío returns home and is questioned by her mother Mariana, Laura's older sister, as to her whereabouts. Rocío brushes her mother off, leaving Mariana suspicious.

At dawn, Paco receives a voice recording of Irene begging for her rescue and a text message of where to perform the exchange. He grabs the duffel bag and drives to the destination. Once he arrives, Paco gets out of his car and rushes to inspect a loud noise made by something large being tossed into a nearby river. When he returns to his car, he finds Irene tied up in the backseat and the bag missing. He delivers Irene to Laura and Alejandro, who rush Irene to a hospital. Exhausted, Paco returns home, only to find that Bea has left him.

Shortly afterwards, Laura and her family pack their belongings and say goodbye to the family as they will be returning to Argentina. Felipe promises to call Irene when she gets home. In the car, Irene asks Alejandro why it was Paco who rescued her. He does not answer. As the car drives off, Mariana sits by herself in the town square. She calls over her husband, Fernando, and with a cold stare asks him to sit down because they "must talk". As the two begin to converse, the screen fades to white.

== Cast ==
- Penélope Cruz as Laura, Mariana and Ana's sister, Alejandro's wife, Irene and Diego's mother, and Antonio's daughter
- Javier Bardem as Paco, Bea's husband
- Ricardo Darín as Alejandro, Laura's husband and Irene and Diego's father
- Bárbara Lennie as Bea, Paco's wife
- Inma Cuesta as Ana, Laura's younger sister, Irene's aunt, Joan's fiancée, and Antonio's daughter
- Elvira Mínguez as Mariana, Laura's older sister, Irene's aunt, Fernando's wife, Antonio's daughter, and Rocío's mother
- Eduard Fernández as Fernando, Mariana's husband and Rocío's father
- Ramón Barea as Antonio, Ana, Mariana, and Laura's father and Irene's grandfather
- Sara Sálamo as Rocío, Fernando's and Mariana's daughter
- Carla Campra as Irene, Laura's and Alejandro's daughter, Antonio's granddaughter, Ana and Mariana's niece
- Roger Casamajor as Joan, Ana's fiancé
- José Ángel Egido as Jorge, a retired policeman
- Sergio Castellanos as Felipe, a young local boy and Paco's nephew whom Irene befriends
- Jaime Lorente as Luis, a young local barber
- Paco Pastor Gómez as Gabriel, Rocio's estranged husband
- Iván Chavero as Diego, Laura and Alejandro's son, Antonio's grandson, Ana and Mariana's nephew
- Jordi Bosch

== Production ==
The film is a French-Spanish-Italian co-production and received funding from Canal+, Eurimages, France Télévisions, Ciné+, ICAA, and Movistar, among others.

Principal photography started in August 2017.

== Release ==
The film had its world premiere at the Cannes Film Festival on 8 May 2018. Shortly after, having previously purchased Spanish distribution rights to the film, Focus Features further acquired distribution rights to the film in the United States, Canada, United Kingdom, Ireland, Australia, New Zealand, South Africa, the Middle East excluding Iran and select Asian territories including India in a bidding war that included Netflix among others. It also screened at the Toronto International Film Festival on 8 September 2018. It was released in Spain on 14 September 2018. It was released in the United States on 8 February 2019.

== Reception ==
=== Critical response ===
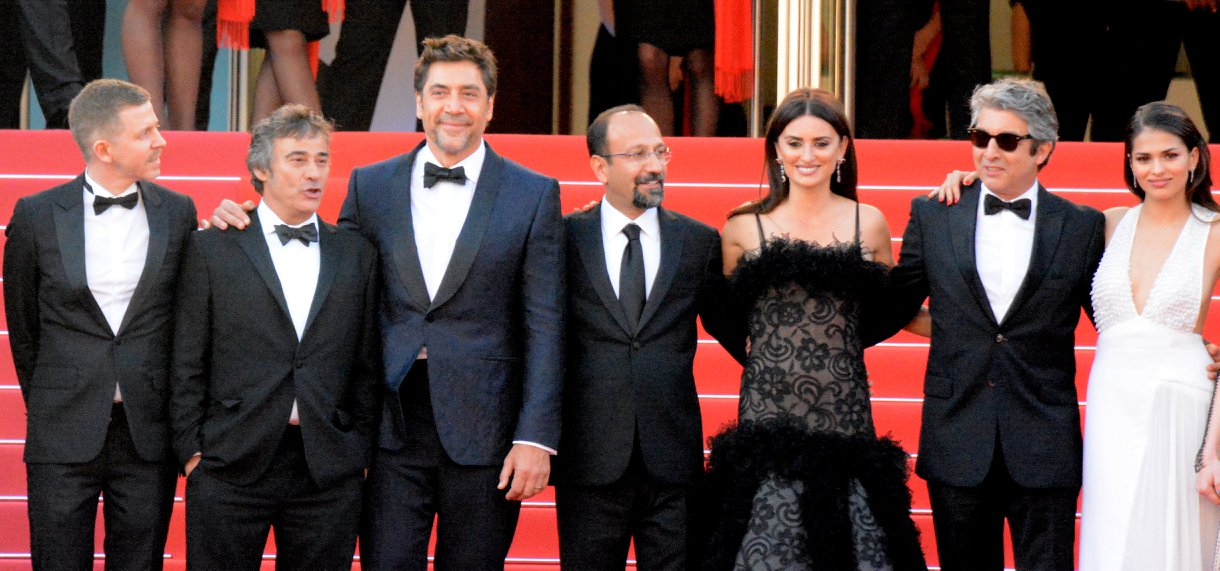
Cast and director at the 2018 Cannes Film Festival

On review aggregator website Rotten Tomatoes, the film holds an approval rating of 78% based on 179 reviews, and an average rating of 6.9/10. The Critics Consensus says: "Everybody Knows is somewhat less than the sum of its parts despite the efforts of an outstanding cast - and a disappointing step back for writer-director Asghar Farhadi." On the aggregator Metacritic, the film has a weighted average score of 68 out of 100, based on 16 critics, indicating "generally favorable reviews".

Writing for The A.V. Club, A. A. Dowd gave the film a B rating, saying that "Javier Bardem and Penélope Cruz help break Cannes' opening-night curse". Australian film site This Is Film similarly awarded the film a positive review, with contributing critic Peter Gray stating it was “an absorbing, expertly-crafted thriller that continually holds your emotions at ransom”.

=== Awards and nominations ===
Year	Award	Category	Nominee(s)	Result	Ref.
2019	24th Forqué Awards	Best Actor	Javier Bardem	Nominated	
2019	24th Forqué Awards	Best Actress	Penélope Cruz	Nominated	
2019	6th Feroz Awards	Best Drama Film		Nominated	
2019	6th Feroz Awards	Best Actor (film)	Javier Bardem	Nominated	
2019	6th Feroz Awards	Best Actress (film)	Penélope Cruz	Nominated	
2019	6th Feroz Awards	Best Supporting Actor (film)	Eduard Fernández	Nominated	
2019	6th Feroz Awards	Best Supporting Actress (film)	Bárbara Lennie	Nominated	
2019	6th Feroz Awards	Best Trailer		Nominated	
2019	74th CEC Medals	Best Film		Nominated	
2019	74th CEC Medals	Best Director	Asghar Farhadi	Nominated	
2019	74th CEC Medals	Best Actor	Javier Bardem	Nominated	
2019	74th CEC Medals	Best Actress	Penélope Cruz	Nominated	
2019	74th CEC Medals	Best Supporting Actor	Eduard Fernández	Nominated	
2019	74th CEC Medals	Best Supporting Actress	Bárbara Lennie	Nominated	
2019	74th CEC Medals	Best Original Screenplay	Asghar Farhadi	Nominated	
2019	74th CEC Medals	Best Editing	Hayedeh Safiyari	Nominated	
2019	33rd Goya Awards	Best Film		Nominated	
2019	33rd Goya Awards	Best Director	Asghar Farhadi	Nominated	
2019	33rd Goya Awards	Best Original Screenplay	Asghar Farhadi	Nominated	
2019	33rd Goya Awards	Best Actor	Javier Bardem	Nominated	
2019	33rd Goya Awards	Best Actress	Penélope Cruz	Nominated	
2019	33rd Goya Awards	Best Supporting Actor	Eduard Fernández	Nominated	
2019	33rd Goya Awards	Best Editing	Hayedeh Safiyari	Nominated	
2019	33rd Goya Awards	Best Original Song	"Una de esas noches sin final" by Javier Limón	Nominated	
2019	28th Actors and Actresses Union Awards	Best Film Actor in a Leading Role	Javier Bardem	Nominated	
2019	28th Actors and Actresses Union Awards	Best Film Actress in a Leading Role	Penélope Cruz	Nominated	
2019	28th Actors and Actresses Union Awards	Best Film Actress in a Minor Role	Elvira Mínguez	Won	
2019	6th Platino Awards	Best Actor	Javier Bardem	Nominated	
2019	6th Platino Awards	Best Actress	Penélope Cruz	Nominated	

== See also ==
- List of Spanish films of 2018
- List of French films of 2018
