= Fariña =

Fariña is a last name, held by many people.

- The death of Carlos Fariña in 1973 is a Chilean political scandal
- Leonardo Fariña, Argentine TV personality
- Luis Fariña, Argentine football player
- Mimi Fariña, American singer
- Richard Fariña, American writer and folksinger

== Other uses ==
- Fariña (TV series), a 2018 Spanish TV series
