= Alexandra Jiménez =

Spanish actress

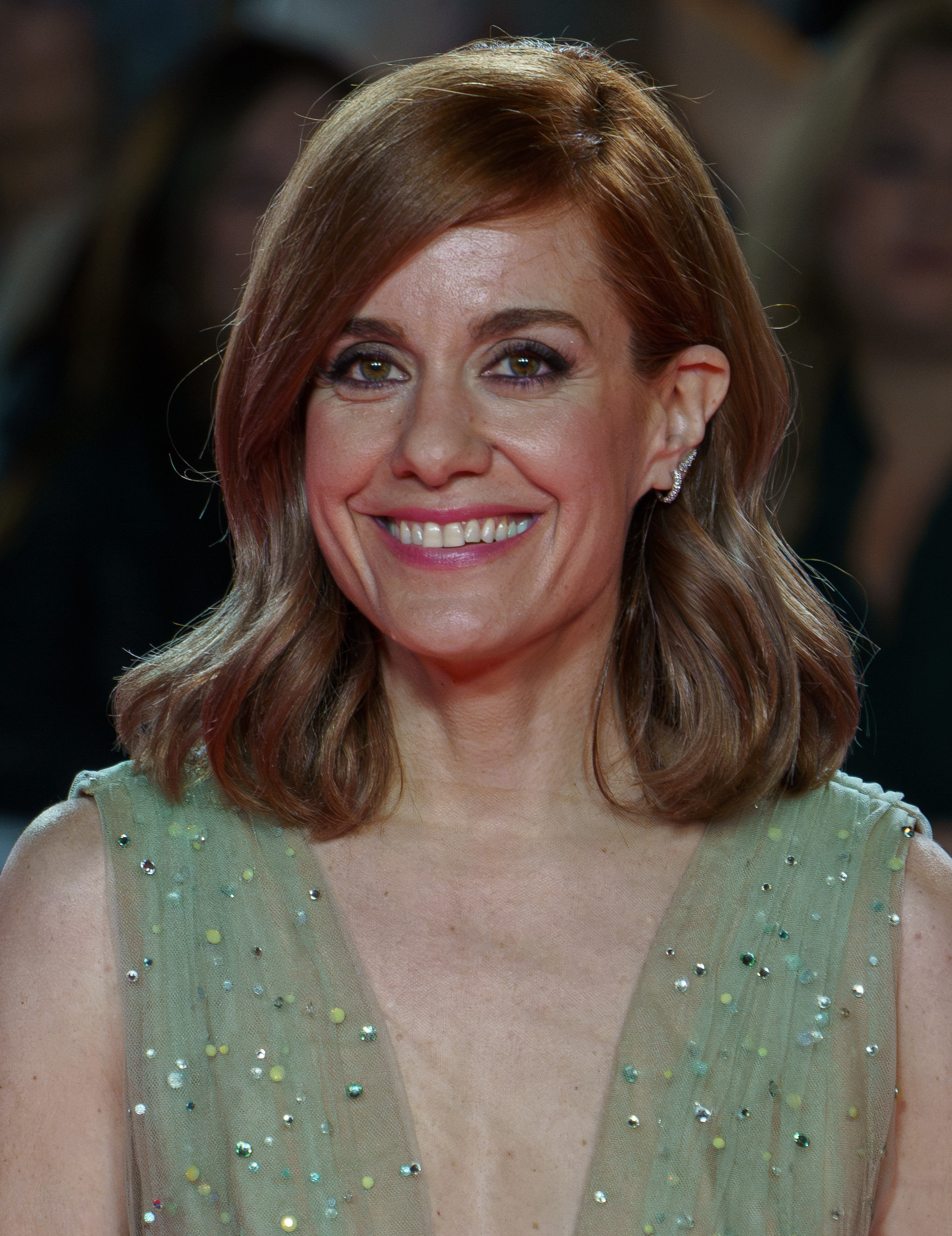
- Jiménez in 2025
- Born: Alexandra Jiménez Arrechea; 4 January 1980 (age 46); Zaragoza, Spain
- Occupations: Actress; stand-up comedian; TV host; ballet dancer
- Years active: 1998–present

Alexandra Jiménez Arrechea (born 4 January 1980) is a Spanish actress. She became popular for her role as África Sanz in the sitcom Los Serrano. She starred in the TV series La pecera de Eva, broadcast between 2010 and 2011. Between 2015 and 2016 she hosted the stand-up comedy show El club de la comedia.

== Biography ==
She was born in Zaragoza on 4 January 1980. When Jiménez was young, she did ballet and trained at the Zaragoza's Estudio de Danza María de Ávila and the Madrid's Real Conservatorio Profesional de Danza. She became a professional ballet dancer when she was 15 years old. After an injury while she was working for the Cuban National Ballet, she set out on an acting career.

Jiménez studied acting in Madrid at the Escuela Universitaria de Artes TAI and made small appearances in television series such as Periodistas, Policías, en el corazón de la calle and Compañeros during her studies. In 2004, she joined Los Serrano, where she played África Sanz.

Between 2010 and 2011, she starred in the TV series La pecera de Eva, playing the main role of Eva Padrón, a psychologist dedicated to solving the problems of a group of teenagers. She replayed the popular role of Eva in 2012 in the finale of the first season of Frágiles.

She replaced Eva Hache as hostess of the TV stand-up comedy show El club de la comedia in La Sexta, hosting the show between 2015 and 2016.

== Filmography ==
=== Television ===
Year	Title	Role	Notes	Ref.
2002	Periodistas	Laura	1 episode	
2003	Tres son multitud	Valeria		
2004–08	Los Serrano	África Sanz		
2009	La familia Mata	Eva Mata		
2010–11	La pecera de Eva	Eva Padrón		
2011–12	Cheers	Rebeca Santaolalla	A mashup of the characters Diane Chambers and Rebecca Howe from the original American series	
2012	Frágiles	Eva	1 episode. Same character as in La pecera de Eva	
2013	Familia	Carlota		
2016	El ministerio del tiempo	Teresa Méndez / Julia Lozano	1 episode	
2017	La zona	Julia Martos		
2019	Hospital Valle Norte	Paula Díaz del Pino		
2019	Atrapa a un ladrón	Lola Garay		
2021	El inocente (The Innocent)	Lorena Ortiz		

=== Film ===
Year	Title	Role	Notes	Ref.
2003	La fiesta	Trini		
2008	Fuera de carta (Chef's Special)	Paula		
2009	Spanish Movie	Ramira	The character is a spoof look-alike of Penélope Cruz's character in Volver	
2010	No controles (Love Storming)	Bea		
2012	Promoción fantasma (Ghost Graduation)	Tina		
2015	Anacleto: agente secreto (Spy Time)	Katia		
2015	Los miércoles no existen (Wednesdays Don't Exist)	Irene		
2015	Barcelona, nit d'hivern (Barcelona Christmas Night)	Alba		
2016	Embarazados (We Are Pregnant)	Alina		
2016	100 metros (100 Meters)	Inma		
2017	Toc Toc	Blanca		
2018	Les distàncies (Distances)	Olivia		
2018	Superlópez	Luisa Lanas		
2019	Gente que viene y bah (In Family I Trust)	Irene		
2019	Si yo fuera rico (If I Were Rich)	Maite		
2022	Historias para no contar (Stories Not to Be Told)	Carol		
2022	Vasil	Luisa		
2023	Bajo terapia (Under Therapy)	Laura		
2023	La ternura (The Tenderness)	Princesa Rubí		
2024	Buscando a Coque (Idol Affair)	Teresa		
2024	Menudas piezas (Checkmates)	Candela		
2025	Tras el verano (The Stepmother's Bond)	Paula		
2026	53 domingos (53 Sundays)	Carol		
2026	Gracias, equipo (Go Team!)	Olga		
2026	En nombre de otro † (Proxies)			

=== Theatre ===
- Fin del mundo, todos al tren (2002)
- Los menecomos (2002)
- Siete por siete (2003)
- 5mujeres.com (2004)
- Hombres, mujeres y punto
- Un pequeño juego, sin consecuencias (2006)

== Accolades ==
Year	Award	Category	Work	Result	Ref.
2006	15th Actors and Actresses Union Awards	Best Television Actress in a Minor Role	Los Serrano	Nominated	
2011	20th Actors and Actresses Union Awards	Best Television Actress in a Leading Role	La pecera de Eva	Nominated	
2016	25th Actors and Actresses Union Awards	Best Film Actress in a Minor Role	Requirements to Be a Normal Person	Nominated	
2017	9th Gaudí Awards	Best Supporting Actress	100 Meters	Won	
2018	5th Feroz Awards	Best Main Actress in a Series	La zona	Nominated	
2018	27th Actors and Actresses Union Awards	Best Television Actress in a Leading Role	La zona	Nominated	
2018	21st Málaga Film Festival	Silver Biznaga for Best Actress	Distances	Won	
2019	24th Forqué Awards	Best Actress	Distances	Nominated	
2019	6th Feroz Awards	Best Main Actress in a Film	Distances	Nominated	
2019	11th Gaudí Awards	Best Actress	Distances	Nominated	
2019	28th Actors and Actresses Union Awards	Best Film Actress in a Secondary Role	Superlópez	Nominated	
2024	32nd Actors and Actresses Union Awards	Best Film Actress in a Secondary Role	The Tenderness	Nominated	
