= The Snatch Thief =

2018 film

- Film poster
- Directed by: Agustin Toscano
- Written by: Agustin Toscano
- Starring: Sergio Prina
- Release date: 15 May 2018 (Cannes)
- Country: Argentina
- Language: Spanish

The Snatch Thief (Spanish: El Motoarrebatador) is a 2018 Argentine drama film directed by Agustin Toscano. It was screened in the Directors' Fortnight section at the 2018 Cannes Film Festival. In 2019, the film participated in the 20th Havana Film Festival New York where Sergio Prina was awarded the Havana Star Prize for Best Actor for his role in the film.

== Cast ==
- Sergio Prina
- Liliana Juarez
- Leon Zelarayan
- Mirella Pascual
