= Distances (film) =

- Film poster
- Catalan: Les distàncies
- Spanish: Las distancias
- Directed by: Elena Trapé
- Written by: Josan Hatero; Miguel Ibáñez Monroy; Elena Trapé
- Produced by: Marta Ramírez
- Starring: Alexandra Jiménez; Miki Esparbé; Isak Férriz; Bruno Sevilla; Maria Ribera
- Production company: Coming Soon Films
- Distributed by: Sherlock Films
- Release dates: 17 April 2018 (Málaga); 7 September 2018 (Spain)
- Country: Spain
- Languages: Catalan; Spanish; English; German

Distances (Catalan: Les distàncies; Spanish: Las distancias) is a 2018 Spanish drama film directed by Elena Trapé which stars Alexandra Jiménez, Miki Esparbé, Isak Férriz, Bruno Sevilla and Maria Ribera. It features dialogue in Catalan, Spanish, English and German.

== Plot ==
The plot deals with the theme of the loss of friendship. Four friends travel from Barcelona to Berlin, set to deliver a surprise birthday party to their friend Comas. However disappointment ensues, as they find things are not as they were before when they were young.

== Cast ==
- Alexandra Jiménez as Olivia
- Miki Esparbé as Comas
- Isak Férriz as Guille
- Bruno Sevilla as Eloi
- Maria Ribera as Anna

== Production ==
Distances was produced by Coming Soon Films in association with TVC, Miss Wasabi and Busse & Halberschmidt, with support from ICEC, ICAA and RTVE. The screenplay was penned by the director Elena Trapé alongside Josan Hatero and Miguel Ibáñez Monroy. Filming began in Berlin in February 2017 and wrapped on 21 March 2017.

== Release ==
The film was presented on 17 April 2018 at the 21st Málaga Film Festival, screened in the festival's main competition. Distributed by Sherlock Films, it was theatrically released in Spain on 7 September 2018.

== Reception ==
Beatriz Martínez of Fotogramas gave the film 4 out of 5 stars, praising an "excellent cast" in which Alexandra Jiménex stands out.

Sarah Ward of ScreenDaily described Distances as "a nuanced, quiet and often emotionally claustrophobic film", also considering that it is anchored by "strong performances", with Alexandra Jiménez' role as a pregnant woman being a "particular standout".

== Accolades ==
Year	Award	Category	Nominee(s)	Result	Ref.
2018	21st Málaga Film Festival	Golden Biznaga for Best Spanish Film		Won	
2018	21st Málaga Film Festival	Silver Biznaga for Best Director	Elena Trapé	Won	
2018	21st Málaga Film Festival	Silver Biznaga for Best Actress	Alexandra Jiménez	Won	
2019	24th Forqué Awards	Best Actress	Alexandra Jiménez	Nominated	
2019	6th Feroz Awards	Best Actress	Alexandra Jiménez	Nominated	
2019	6th Feroz Awards	Best Film Poster	Elena Castillo	Nominated	
2019	63rd Sant Jordi Awards	Best Spanish Film		Won	
2019	11th Gaudí Awards	Best Film		Won	
2019	11th Gaudí Awards	Best Director	Elena Trapé	Nominated	
2019	11th Gaudí Awards	Best Screenplay	Elena Trapé, Josan Hatero, Miguel Ibáñez Monroy	Nominated	
2019	11th Gaudí Awards	Best Actress	Alexandra Jiménez	Nominated	
2019	11th Gaudí Awards	Best Supporting Actress	Maria Ribera	Nominated	
2019	11th Gaudí Awards	Best Supporting Actor	Miki Esparbé	Nominated	
2019	11th Gaudí Awards	Best Editing	Liana Artigal	Nominated	

== See also ==
- List of Spanish films of 2018
