= The Photographer of Mauthausen =

2018 film directed by Mar Targarona

- Spanish: El fotógrafo de Mauthausen
- Directed by: Mar Targarona
- Written by: Roger Danès; Alfred Pérez Fargas
- Produced by: István Major; Joaquín Padró; Mar Targarona
- Starring: Mario Casas; Macarena Gómez; Alain Hernández
- Cinematography: Aitor Mantxola
- Edited by: José Luis Romeu
- Music by: Diego Navarro
- Production companies: Rodar y Rodar; We Produce 2017 AIE; Filmteam
- Distributed by: Filmax
- Release date: 26 October 2018
- Running time: 110 min
- Country: Spain
- Language: Spanish

The Photographer of Mauthausen (Spanish: El fotógrafo de Mauthausen) is a 2018 Spanish biography drama historical film directed by Mar Targarona starring Mario Casas, Macarena Gómez, and Alain Hernández. The film tells the history of the photographer Francisco Boix during his life in the Mauthausen-Gusen concentration camp complex.

Actor Mario Casas lost 12 kg in weight while preparing to play the part of the malnourished Boix.

== Plot ==
Based on the true story of Spanish Civil War veteran Francisco Boix, a prisoner at Nazi German Mauthausen concentration camp, who preserved and hid photographs of the conditions at camp. Boix and his fellow prisoners risked their lives to save negatives and evidence of the atrocities committed at Mauthausen.

== Cast ==
- Mario Casas as Francisco Boix
- Richard van Weyden as Paul Ricken
- Alain Hernández as Valbuena
- Adrià Salazar as Anselmo
- Eduard Buch as Fonseca
- Stefan Weinert as Franz Ziereis
- Nikola Stojanovic as Bonarewitz
- Rubén Yuste as Rosales
- Allan Freman as Quatra
- Frank Feys as Popeye
- Marc Rodríguez as Enfermero
- Albert Mora as Músico
- Joan Negrié as Lejías
- Luka Peros as Karl Schulz
- Rainer Reiners as Poschacher
- Toni Gomila as Francisco
- Macarena Gómez as Dolores
- Emilio Gavira as Alexander Katan (Preso A.K.)
- Soma Zámbori as Chmielewski
- Erik Gyarmati as Siegfried
- Marta Holler as Anna Pointner
- Dénes Ujlaky as Albert Pointner
- Miguel Ángel González as Preso español esquelético
- Andreu Carandell as Preso crematorio
- Patrik Petrovski as Kapo carpinteria
- Minnie Marx as SS prostíbulo
- Koos Vos as SS oficina política
- Abel Rodríguez as Chaval ido
- Roger Vilà as Chaval tuerto
- Igor Szpakowski as Chaval Pérez
- Gábor Deák as SS private
- Ági Krasznahorkai as Mrs. Ziereis
- Mariann Kocsis as Mrs. Poschacher
- Balázs Szitás as Bufoon Prisoner
- Bernat Cot as Preso dibujante
- Ralph Herbling as Médico alemán
- Guifré Baró as Ayudante de mago
- Roger Bosch as Músico mandolina
- Guillem Gefaell as Músico guitarra
- Kristóf Widder as SS Gaswagen
- Norbert Kovacs as Waiter 1
- Péter Sokorai as Waiter 2
- Balazs Lengyel as Austrian Prisoner 1
- Laszlo Tamás Farkas as Austrian Prisoner 2
- Miklós Danka as SS 1
- Béla Orsányi as SS 2
- Efrain Anglès as Kapo
- Darien Asian
- Anatoly Chugunov as Soldier
- Balázs Veres as Birthday Guest

== Production ==
The film is a Rodar y Rodar, We Produce 2017 AIE and Filmteam production, and it had the participation/collaboration of RTVE, TV3, ICCA, ICEC, and Netflix.

== Release ==
Distributed by Filmax, the film was theatrically released in Spain on 26 October 2018.

== Accolades ==
Year	Award	Category	Nominee(s)	Result	Ref.
2019	33rd Goya Awards	Best Makeup and Hairstyles	Caitlin Acheson, Jesús Martos, Pablo Perona	Nominated	
2019	33rd Goya Awards	Best Production Supervision	Eduard Vallès, Hanga Kurucz	Nominated	
2019	33rd Goya Awards	Best Art Direction	Rosa Ros	Nominated	
2019	33rd Goya Awards	Best Costume Design	Mercè Paloma	Nominated	

== See also ==
- List of Spanish films of 2018
