= Marisa Paredes =

Spanish film actress (1946–2024)

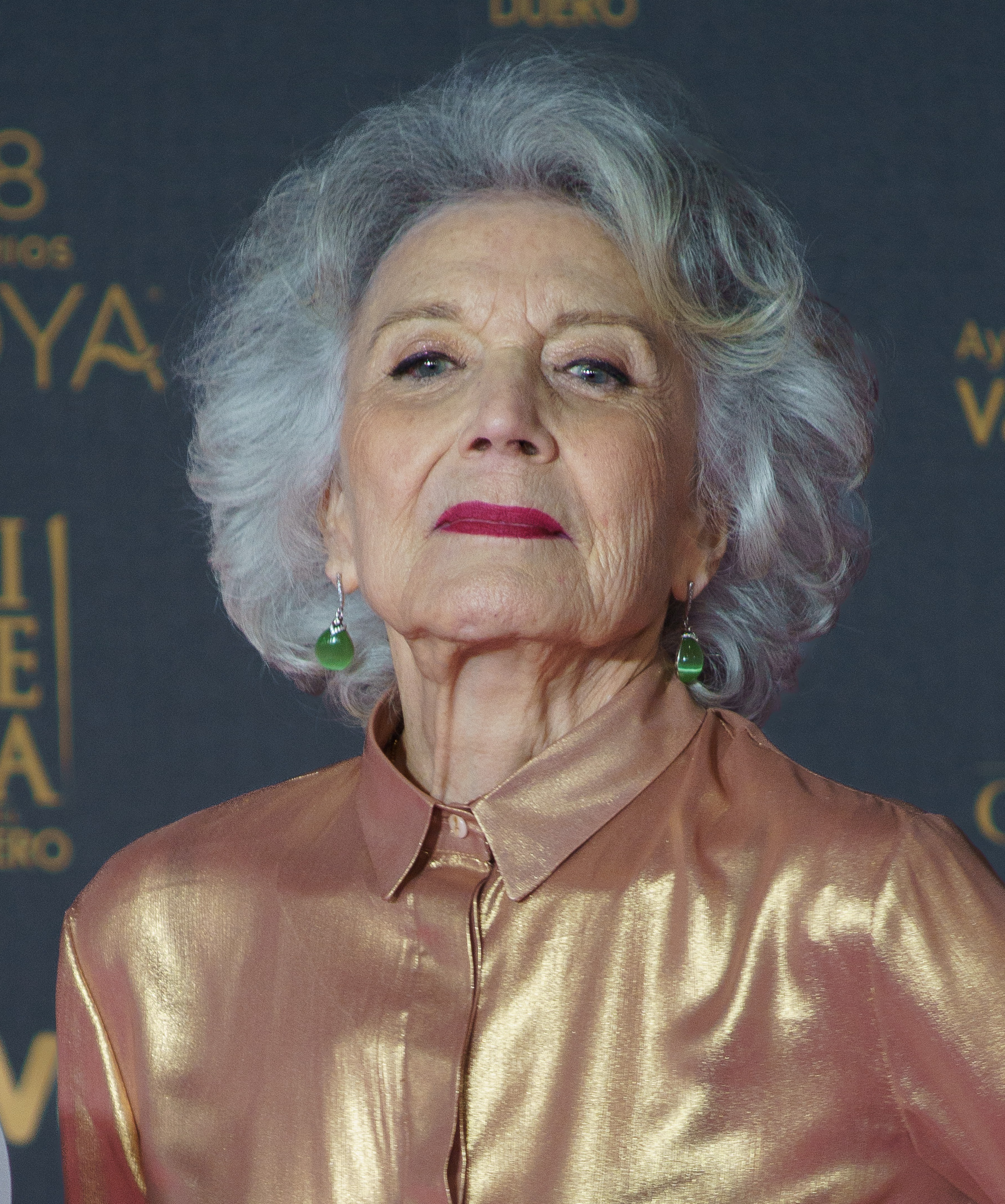
- Paredes in February 2024

President of the Academy of Cinematographic Arts and Sciences of Spain
- In office 17 December 2000 – 9 October 2003
- Preceded by: Aitana Sánchez-Gijón
- Succeeded by: Mercedes Sampietro

Personal details
- Born: María Luisa Paredes Bartolomé; 3 April 1946 Madrid, Spain
- Died: 17 December 2024 (aged 78) Madrid, Spain
- Children: María Isasi
- Occupation: Actress
- Years active: 1960–2024
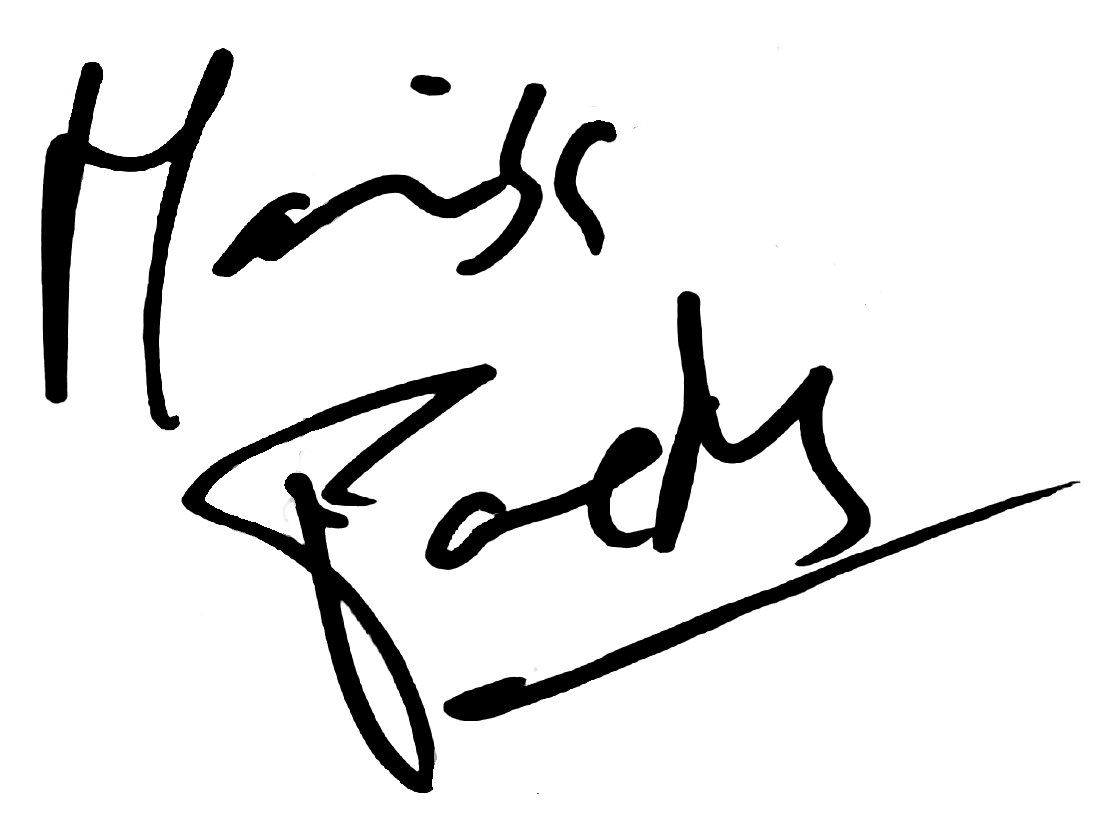
- Signature

María Luisa Paredes Bartolomé (3 April 1946 – 17 December 2024), known professionally as Marisa Paredes, was a Spanish actress with a 60-year-long career. She acted in more than 75 films, 80 TV shows, and 15 plays.

== Life and career ==
Paredes made her film debut in José María Forqué's 1960 film Police Calling 091. She became a teen idol across Spain after that film. In 1961, she made her début in theatre, and since then she has performed different plays such as Hamlet with Eduard Fernández. In 1975, she and Raphael collaborated in a cartoon film about him, Rafael en Raphael. She has participated in 73 films and television series. She portrayed the leading role of La Peregrina in a television production of Alejandro Casona's La dama del alba.

Pedro Almodóvar helped her to achieve her recognition, as she featured in many of his films, such as Dark Habits (1983), High Heels (1991), The Flower of My Secret (1995), All About My Mother (1999) and The Skin I Live In (2011). For her role in The Flower of My Secret, she was nominated for the Goya Award for Best Actress.

She appeared in several other acclaimed films, including In a Glass Cage (1986) by Agustí Villaronga (Majorca), Life Is Beautiful (1998) by Roberto Benigni (Italy), Deep Crimson (1996) by Arturo Ripstein and The Devil's Backbone (2001) by Guillermo del Toro (both from Mexico).

In 1996, she was given the National Film Award by the Spanish Ministry of Culture. From 2000 to 2003, she was the president of the Academia de las Artes y las Ciencias Cinematográficas de España.

In 2007, she was given at Gijón International Film Festival, a National Film Award named after Nacho Martinez.

In the 1970s, she had a domestic partnership of about seven years with filmmaker Antonio Isasi-Isasmendi, with whom she had one daughter, María Isasi. Between 1983 and her death, she had been in a relationship with Chema Prado.

In 2023, she appeared in a small role as a woman known as "La República" in the Atresplayer series Vestidas de azul.

Paredes died from heart failure in Madrid, on 17 December 2024, at the age of 78.

Her lying in repose was held on the next day at the Teatro Español.

She appeared in a posthumous performance in Emergency Exit, released in 2025.

== Selected filmography ==
Year	Title	Role	Notes	Awards	Ref.
1965	El mundo sigue (Life Goes On)	Floren			
1977	El perro (A Dog Called... Vengeance)	Guerrillera			
1983	Entre tinieblas (Dark Habits)	Sor Estiércol			
1986	Tata mía (Dear Nanny)	Paloma			
1986	Tras el cristal (In a Glass Cage)	Griselda			
1987	Cara de acelga (Turnip Top)	Olga			
1989	Continental	Xulia			
1991	High Heels	Becky del Páramo		Sant Jordi Award for Best Spanish Actress, Fotogramas de Plata Award for Best Movie Actress, Festival de Gramado Award for Best Actress, Spanish Actors and Actresses Union Award for Lead Performance	
1992	La reina anónima (The Anonymous Queen)	Desconocida			
1992	Hors saison (Off Season)	Sarah Bernhardt			
1992	Tierno verano de lujurias y azoteas	Olga			
1993	Tombés du ciel	Suzana			
1995	La flor de mi secreto (The Flower of My Secret)	Leocadia Macías / Amanda Gris / Paz Sufrategui		Fotogramas de Plata Award for Best Movie Actress, Karlovy Vary IFF Award for Best Actress, Sant Jordi Award for Best Spanish Actress, Premios ACE Award for Best Actress, Nominated—Goya Award for Best Actress	
1995	La nave de los locos (The Ship of Fools)	Julia Márquez			
1996	Trois vies & une seule mort	Maria			
1996	Deep Crimson (Profundo Carmesi)	Irene Gallardo			
1997	La vita è bella (Life Is Beautiful)	Madre di Dora			
1998	Talk of Angels	Doña Consuelo			
1999	All About My Mother	Huma Rojo		Premios ACE Award for Best Supporting Actress, Santa Fe Film Critics Circle Award for Best Supporting Actress, Nominated—Russian Guild of Film Critics Award for Best Foreign Actress	
1999	El coronel no tiene quien le escriba (No One Writes to the Colonel)	Lola			
2001	The Devil's Backbone	Carmen			
2001	Salvajes (Savages)	Berta			
2004	Frío sol de invierno (Cold Winter Sun)	Raquel			
2005	Espelho Mágico (Magic Mirror)	Monja			
2005	Reinas (Queens)	Reyes			
2009	Amores locos (Mad Love)	Ana			
2010	El dios de madera (The God of Good)	María Luisa		Silver Biznaga for Best Actress	
2010	Gigola	Odette / Gigola's lover			
2011	La piel que habito (The Skin I Live In)	Marilia			
2011	Les Yeux de sa mère	Judit Canalès			
2015	Latin Lover	Ramona			
2018	Petra	Marisa			
2019	De sable et de feu	Lady Williams			
2025	Emergency Exit	Actriz ('actress')	Posthumously released		

== Awards and nominations ==
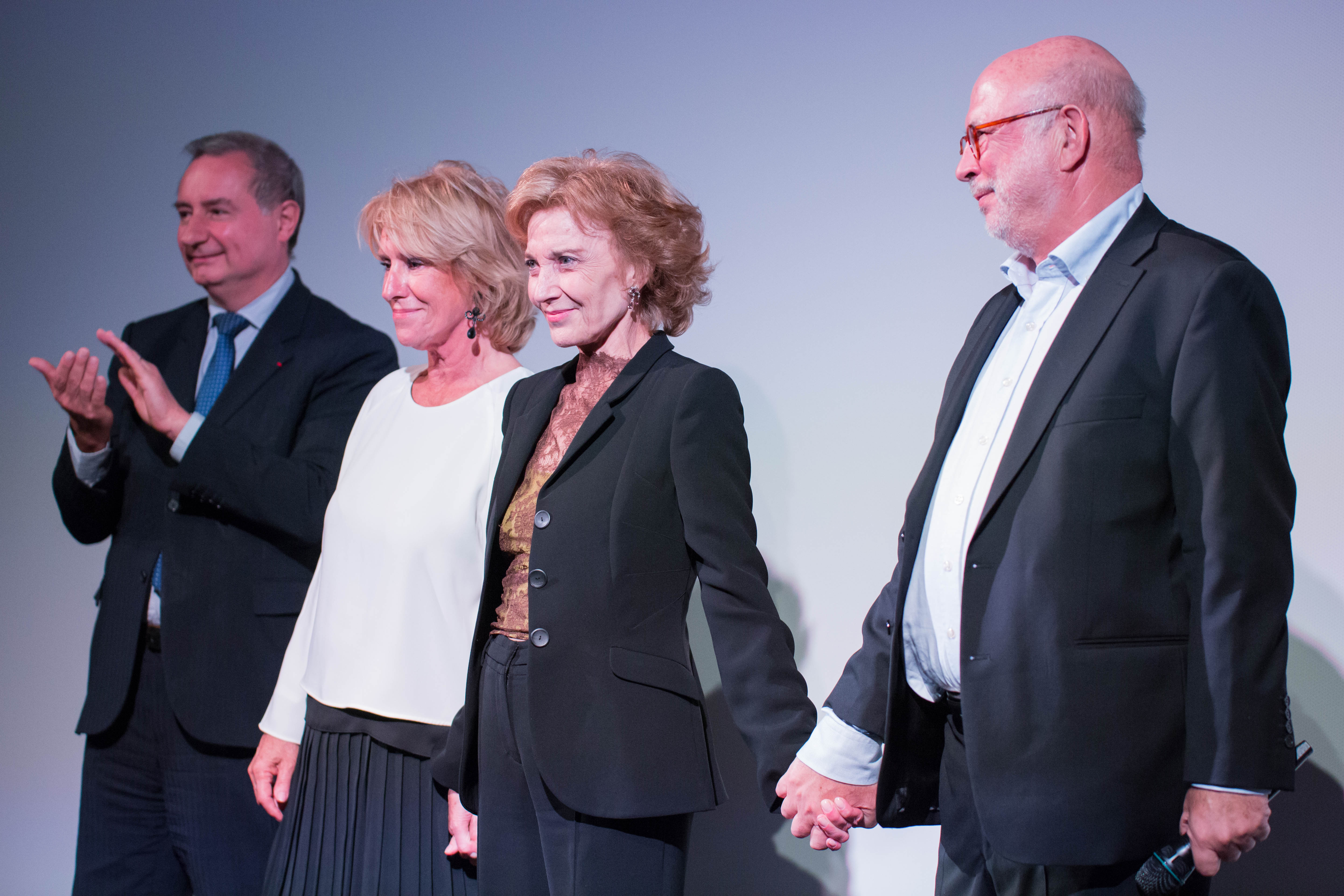
Paredes receiving a recognition at the 2015 Toulouse Spanish Film Festival.

Year	Award	Category	Work	Result	Ref.
1988	2nd Goya Awards	Best Supporting Actress	Turnip Top	Nominated	
1996	10th Goya Awards	Best Actress	The Flower of My Secret	Nominated	
2012	21st Actors and Actresses Union Awards	Best Film Actress in a Minor Role	The Skin I Live In	Nominated	
2018	32nd Goya Awards	Honorary Award	—N/a	Won	
2019	6th Feroz Awards	Best Supporting Actress in a Film	Petra	Nominated	
2019	11th Gaudí Awards	Best Supporting Actress	Petra	Nominated	

Screen Actors Guild Awards

Year	Category	Film	Result
1998	Screen Actors Guild Award for Outstanding Performance by a Cast in a Motion Picture	Life Is Beautiful	Nominated

Fotogramas de Plata

Year	Category	Labour	Result
2015	All her career		Won
2006	Best Theatre Actress	Hamlet	Won
1995	Best Cinema Actress	The Flower Of My Secret	Won
1991	Best Cinema Actress	High Heels	Won
1988	Best Theatre Labour	Orquídeas a la luz de la luna	Nominated
1968	Best Television Performer		Won

Union of Actors Awards

Year	Category	Film	Result
1995	Best Cinema Leading Performer	The Flower Of My Secret	Nominated
1991	Best Cinema Leading Performer	High Heels	Won
