= Edificio Capitol =

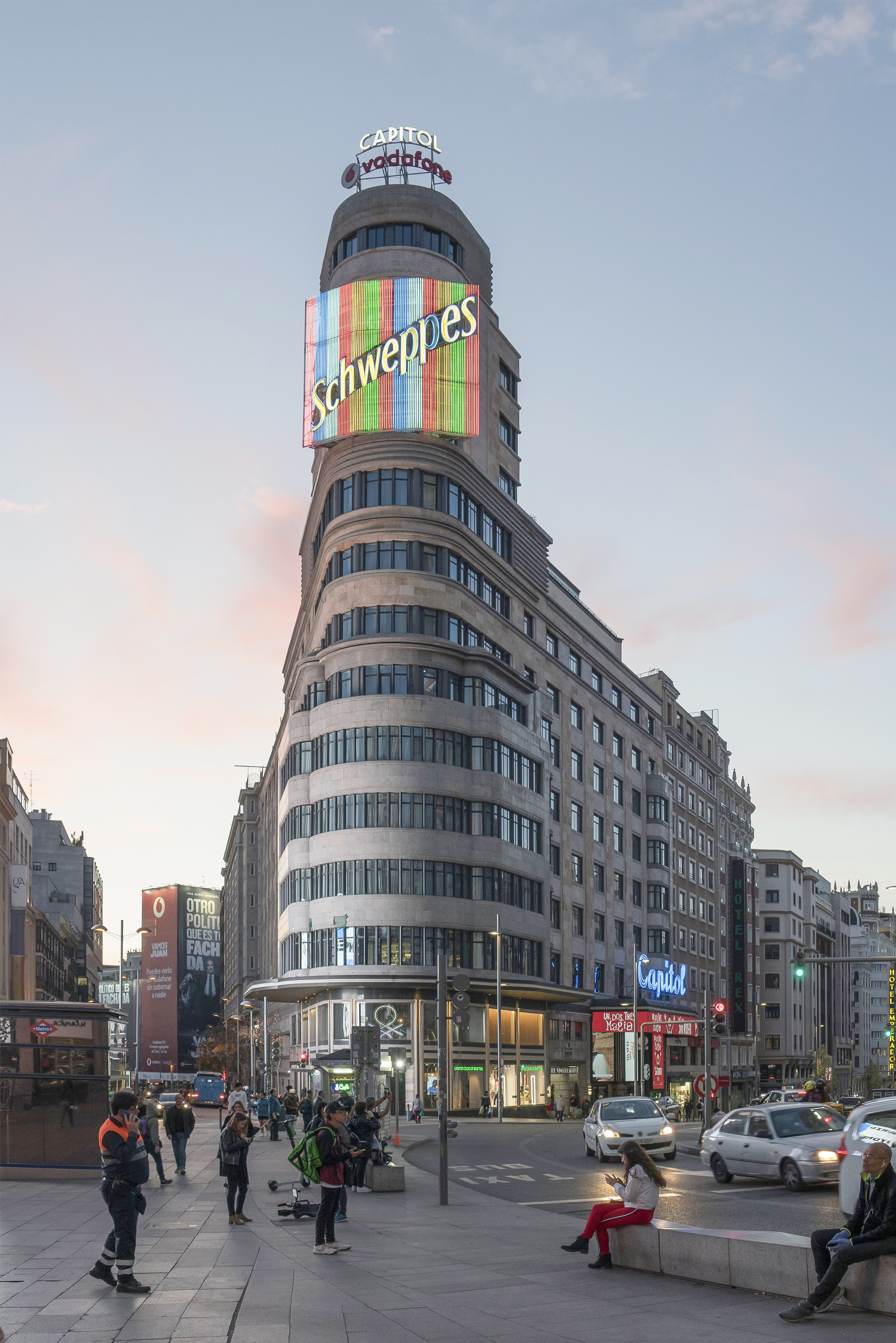
- Interactive map of the Edificio Capitol area

General information
- Classification: Bien de Interés Cultural
- Location: Gran Vía 41 and Jacometrezo 2–6, Madrid, Spain
- Coordinates: 40.420371°N 3.706498°W
- Construction started: 1931
- Completed: 1933
- Inaugurated: 15 October 1933

Design and construction
- Architects: Vicente Eced Eced & Luis Martínez-Feduchi

The Edificio Carrión or Edificio Capitol is a building in central Madrid, Spain. An outstanding example of the expressionist-leaning trend within the wider scope of rationalist architecture in Spain, the building has become an icon of both the Gran Vía and the city.

54 metres high, the building lies on the corner where the Gran Vía meets the Calle de Jacometrezo, near Callao Square. The project was entrusted to Vicente Eced Eced and Luis Martínez Feduchi, who were influenced by the November Group and most specifically by Erich Mendelsohn's works. Building works started on 11 April 1931.

The building was inaugurated on 15 October 1933.

Depicted in many artistic works, the building's façade was prominently used as setting of the movie El día de la bestia. The building was declared Bien de Interés Cultural in 2018.
