= Sant Jordi Awards =

Film prize

- Awarded for: Excellence in film
- Country: Spain
- Presented by: Ràdio 4
- First award: 1957
- Website: http://www.rtve.es/radio/radio4/premis-sant-jordi.shtml

The Sant Jordi Awards (Catalan: Premis Sant Jordi; Spanish: Premios Sant Jordi) are film prizes awarded annually by the Catalan branch of the Spanish public radio network Radio Nacional de España (RNE), Ràdio 4. The awards were established in 1957.

Awards are made in the following categories: Best Debut Feature Film, Best Spanish Film, Best Actress in a Spanish Film, Best Actor in a Spanish Film, Best Foreign Film, Best Actress in a Foreign Film, Best Actor in a Foreign Film, Special Jury Prize, Film Industry Prize, RNE Critics' Prize.

== Best Spanish Film ==
- 2011: Buried
- 2012: Chico and Rita
- 2013: Snow White
- 2014: People in Places
- 2015: Loreak
- 2016: Isla bonita
- 2017: The Next Skin
- 2018: Anchor and Hope
- 2019: Distances
- 2020: Fire Will Come
- 2021: The Year of the Discovery
- 2022: Love Gets a Room
- 2023: The Beasts
- 2024: Society of the Snow
