= Superlópez (2018 film) =

Spanish superhero comedy film

- Directed by: Javier Ruiz Caldera
- Written by: Borja Cobeaga; Diego San José
- Based on: Superlópez by Jan
- Starring: Dani Rovira; Alexandra Jiménez; Julián López; Pedro Casablanc; Maribel Verdú; Gracia Olayo; Ferrán Rañé; Gonzalo de Castro
- Music by: Fernando Velázquez
- Production companies: Mediaset España; Movistar+ Telecinco Cinema; Zeta Cinema
- Distributed by: Buena Vista International
- Release date: 23 November 2018
- Running time: 108 minutes
- Country: Spain
- Language: Spanish

Superlópez is a 2018 Spanish superhero comedy film directed by Javier Ruiz Caldera from a screenplay by Borja Cobeaga and Diego San José based on the comic strip of the same name. It stars Dani Rovira in the titular role.

== Plot ==
In the planet Chitón, scientist Jan has created the "ultimative weapon" to fight against the evil dictator Skorba — a baby with superpowers. He sends him in a spaceship to Earth, but Ágata, Skorba's daughter, follows him in another spaceship to capture him. However, the baby's spaceship impacts with the Hispasat satellite, so he lands on Spain, whereas Ágata lands in United States. The baby is adopted by the López family, who teach him to hide his powers, to not make other people jealous of him.

Years later, López is his 30s and has a normal life only using his powers when nobody is watching. In his office his boss and friend Jaime hires Luisa. Jaime is romantically interested in Luisa, but she is more interested in López and they both go on a date. After the date, a subway loses control and López manages to stop it. Footage of this rescue is seen by Ágata, who is now the owner of the biggest tech company in the world.

Ágata creates an ultrasound machine with a message that can only be heard by López, asking him to meet her. He complies and is informed of his true origin. He goes to his parents’ house to confront them and they show him the spaceship. López accidentally activates a holographic message of his biological father, explaining the Chitón conflict. López's Earth parents convince him to try to learn how to use his powers; after many trials and errors he finally discovers how to fly.

Ágata kidnaps Jaime and Luisa. López manages to rescue them and they go to López's Earth parents's house. There, Ágata attacks them with a giant mecha robot. López's father distracts Ágata by firing a shotgun at her before being sucked into the mech's vacuum, while López attempts to put on his suit despite the hot weather. With the help of his parents and friends, he finally embraces his abilities to become Superlópez and takes on the robot. Ágata sucks him in, only to push him out and cause him to crash at Camp Nou during a match between F.C. Barcelona and Villarreal CF. Juan rips out the goal net but misaims and tosses it at his Earth mother. Ágata captures her, before stamping López into the ground. Before she tries to kill him by buzzsaw, Jamie distracts her, while Luisa drives the López's truck. Regaining consciousness over Luisa's cries, López uses his ice breath on the windshield and pushes it into the pool as the mech trips over the Lópezes's truck. López's adoptive parents and Jamie come out of the pool safe, followed by Ágata. López's adoptive mother reminds him that his home planet is still waiting for his help, before he tells her to not worry as he has a plan.

Days later, Skorba's spaceship returns to Chitón with Ágata, carrying the man from the park who everyone believed as "Juan", and appoints him as the planet's new leader. Back on Earth, Juan becomes a proper superhero, much to the disdain of the press and general public. Luisa and López start dating, while López points at the man who called him Superlópez before he teleports away, leaving behind a pacifier.

== Cast ==
- Dani Rovira as "Superlópez"
- Alexandra Jiménez as Luisa Lanas
- Julián López as Jaime González
- Pedro Casablanc as adoptive López father
- Gracia Olayo as adoptive López mother
- Maribel Verdú as Ágata Müller
- Ferrán Rañé as Skorba
- Gonzalo de Castro as Jan, López biological father

== Reception ==
=== Box office ===
The film had the best opening weekend of 2018 after it was released on 23 November 2018, grossing 2.3 million euros from an attendance of 377,501. After only two weeks of its release, the film had grossed more than 7 million euros by 10 December 2018, making it the third highest-grossing Spanish film of 2018. By the end of the year, with a box-office taking of €10.3 million, it had become the second highest grossing Spanish film of 2018 in Spain, after Champions.

=== Critical reception ===
On review aggregator website Rotten Tomatoes, the film has an approval rating of 67% based on six reviews, with an average rating of 6.8/10.

The movie received generally positive reviews. Oti Rodríguez in ABC describes it as "a surrealist cross between the sainete, the grotesque and the joke about a serious matter (Superman) that has completely lost any hint of sensibility". Beatriz Martínez in El Periódico says that is an "intelligent comedy of adventures that through an addictive rhythm reflects on the Spanish idiosyncrasy, mediocrity and mediocrity as engines that drive our society". More negative is Javier Ocaña in El País who says "Nothing is wrong: neither the interpreters nor the situations nor the dialogues nor the direction. And, nevertheless, not a grimace, because nothing is good enough to provoke a certain merrymaking".

== See also ==
- List of Spanish films of 2018
