= Elena Trapé =

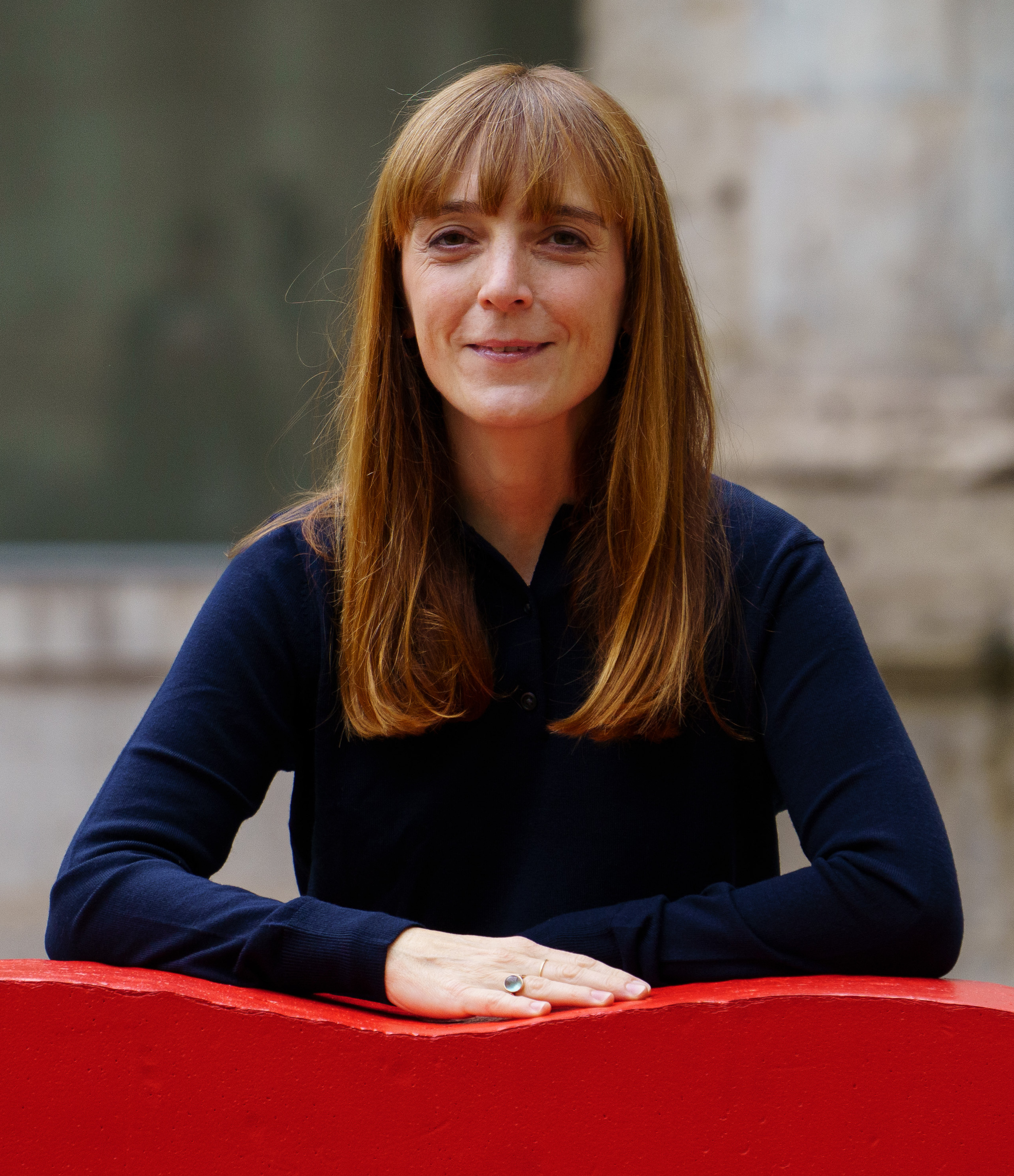
- Trapé in 2025
- Born: 1976 (age 49–50); Barcelona, Spain
- Education: Autonomous University of Barcelona (Lic.); ESCAC
- Occupations: Film director; television director

Elena Trapé (born 1976) is a Spanish film and television director.

== Life and career ==
Trapé was born in 1976 in Barcelona. She earned a licentiate degree in history of art from the Autonomous University of Barcelona and, in 2004, graduated from the Cinema and Audiovisual School of Catalonia (ESCAC) with an specialisation in direction.

Her early filmography included two short films and the TV movie La ruïna. Her directorial debut feature Blog (2010), an exploration of adolescence, entered the 'New Directors' section of the 58th San Sebastián International Film Festival. Her sophomore feature Distances (2018) won the Golden Biznaga and the Best Director Award at the Málaga Film Festival. Her third feature The Enchanted (2023), a drama dealing with the discomfort of post-maternity, entered the 26th Málaga Film Festival.

Her television work include direction credits in series such as the seasons 1 and 2 of HIT (2020–21), Celeste (2024), I, Addict (2024), and Jakarta (2025).
