= Petra (film) =

- Film poster
- Directed by: Jaime Rosales
- Screenplay by: Jaime Rosales; Michel Gaztambide; Clara Roquet Autonell
- Produced by: Bárbara Díez; José María Morales; Antonio Chavarrías; Jérôme Dopffer; Katrin Pors
- Starring: Bárbara Lennie; Àlex Brendemühl; Joan Botey; Marisa Paredes; Petra Martínez; Carme Plà; Oriol Pla; Chema del Barco; Natalie Madueño
- Cinematography: Hélène Louvart
- Edited by: Lucía Casal
- Music by: Kristian Eidnes Andersen
- Production companies: Fresdeval Films; Wanda Visión; Oberon Cinematográfica; Les Productions Balthazar
- Distributed by: Wanda Visión
- Release dates: 10 May 2018 (Cannes); 19 October 2018 (Spain)
- Running time: 1h47min
- Countries: Spain; France; Denmark
- Languages: Spanish; Catalan

Petra is a 2018 tragedy film directed by Jaime Rosales. It was screened in the Directors' Fortnight section at the 2018 Cannes Film Festival.

== Cast ==
- Bárbara Lennie as Petra
- Àlex Brendemühl as Lucas
- Joan Botey as Jaume
- Marisa Paredes as Marisa
- Petra Martínez as Julia
- Carme Plà as Teresa
- Oriol Pla as Pau
- Chema del Barco as Juanjo
- Natalie Madueño as Martha
