= Ana Rujas =

Spanish model turned actress

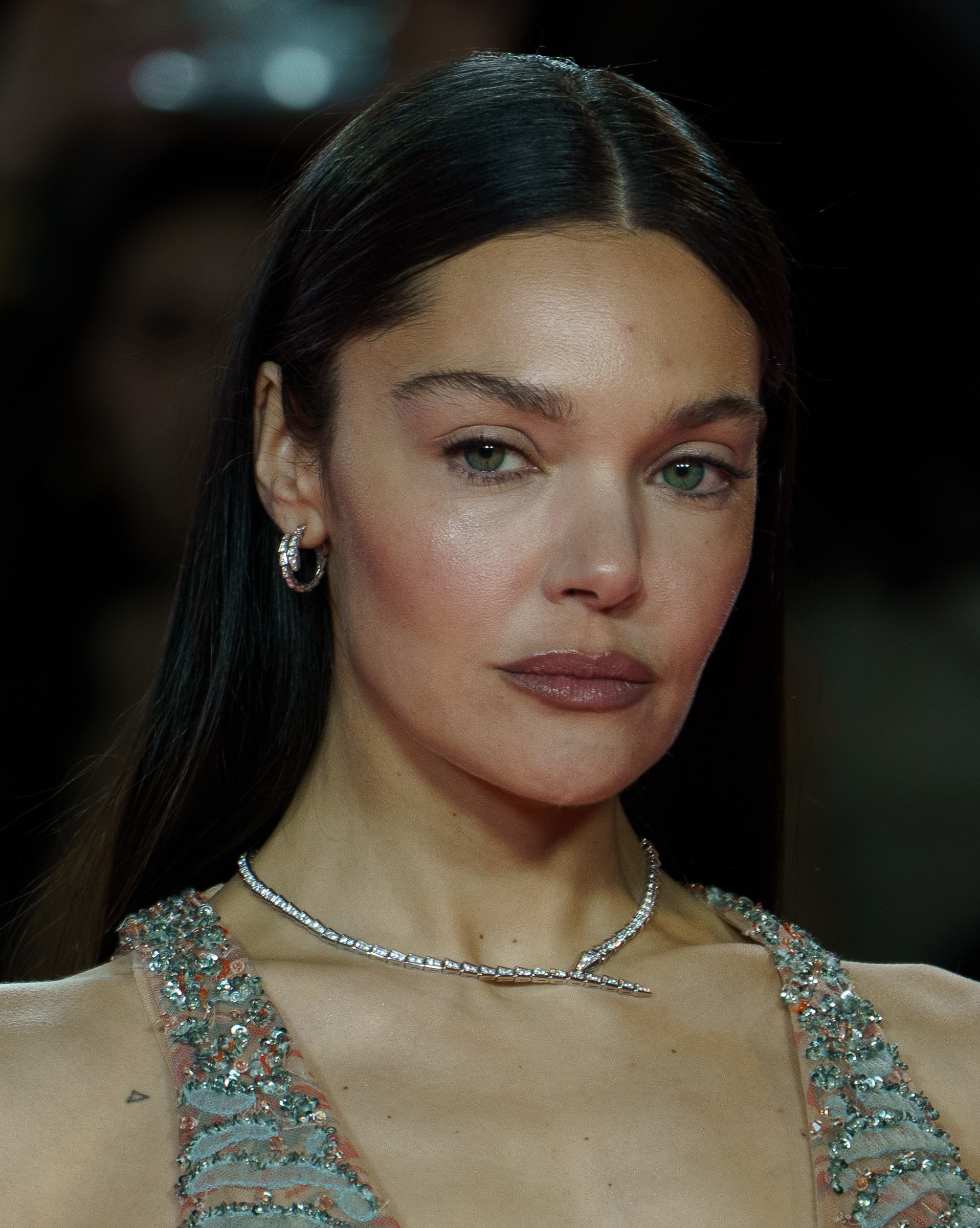
- Rujas in 2025
- Born: Ana Rujas Guerrero; 14 May 1989 (age 37); Madrid, Spain
- Occupations: Actress; model; writer

Ana Rujas Guerrero (born 14 May 1989) is a Spanish model turned actress.

== Early life ==
Ana Rujas Guerrero was born on 14 May 1989 in Madrid. She enrolled in a modeling agency at age 16. She received acting training at the school of Juan Carlos Corazza.

== Career ==
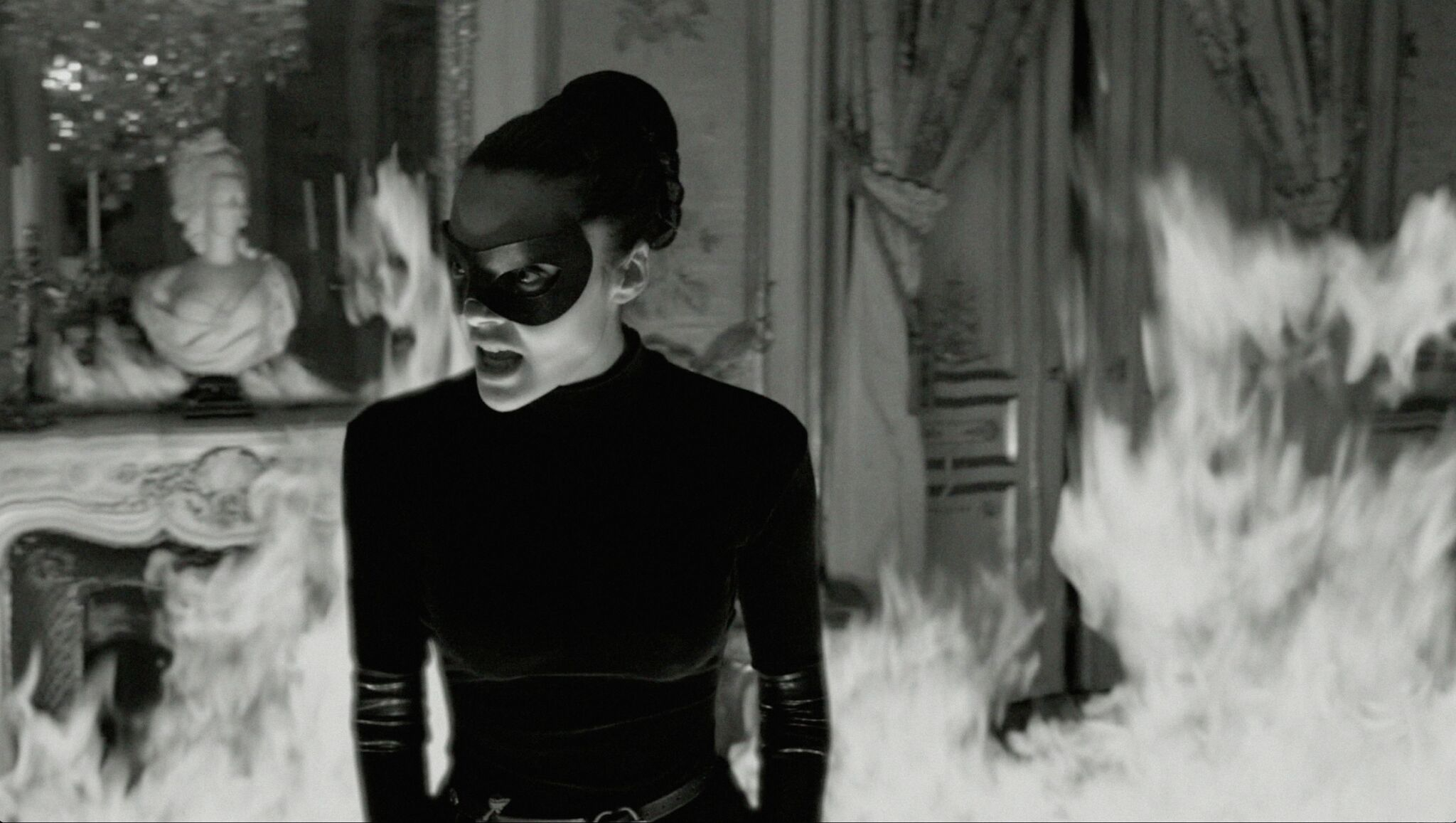
Rujas surrounded by a FX wall of fire on the set of Alice Waddington-directed Disco Inferno

Her first big role was in 90-60-90, diario secreto de una adolescente. She featured in HKM. She portrayed Shaila Dúrcal in the biopic of Rocío Dúrcal. In 2016, she starred in the music video of Zahara, "Caída Libre". She had endorsed the jewelry brand "Aristocrazy". She recently acted in a play, ¿Qué sabes tú de mis tristezas? ('What do you know about my sorrows?').

In 2022, she scooped the Feroz Award for Best Main Actress in a Series for her performance in Cardo (co-created by Rujas alongside Claudia Costafreda), which also won the Best Drama Series Award. In 2023, she portrayed Montserrat in La mesías, earning a nomination to the Feroz Award for Best Main Actress in a Series. In 2023, she published her first book, La otra bestia.

In 2024, she was tipped to helm her directorial debut feature under Movistar Plus+, El desencanto, a film in connection to Jaime Chávarri's picture of the same name. She also landed a leading role in Julio Medem's 8, a romancer shot in eight long takes tracking nine decades of Spanish history, and a role in Celia Rico's historical drama La buena letra based on the novel by Rafael Chirbes.

== Filmography ==
=== Film ===
Year	Title	Role	Notes	Ref.
2013	Gente en sitios (People in Places)			
2017	Toc toc			
2018	Diana	Sofía		
2025	La buena letra (The Good Manners)	Isabel		
2025	8	Adela		
2026	La desconocida (La desconocida)	La desconocida		

=== Television ===
Year	Title	Role	Notes	Ref.
2008–09	HKM	Vicky		
2009	90-60-90, diario secreto de una adolescente	África Villalba		
2011	Punta Escarlata	Vir		
2011	Hispania, la leyenda	Stena		
2011	Rocío Dúrcal, volver a verte	Shaila		
2021–23	Cardo	María	Also creator and writer	
2023	La mesías	Montserrat Baró		
2025	En el barro (In the Mud)	Amparo "La Gallega" Vilches		

== Accolades ==
Year	Award	Category	Work	Result	Ref.
2022	9th Feroz Awards	Best Main Actress in a Series	Cardo	Won	
2023	31st Actors and Actresses Union Awards	Best Television Actress in a Leading Role	Cardo	Nominated	
2023	29th Forqué Awards	Best Actress in a TV Series	La mesías	Nominated	
2024	25th Iris Awards	Best Screenplay (Fiction)	Cardo	Nominated	
2024	11th Feroz Awards	Best Main Actress in a Series	La mesías	Nominated	
2024	32nd Actors and Actresses Union Awards	Best Television Actress in a Leading Role	La mesías	Nominated	
