= 1993 in Spanish television =

This is a list of Spanish television related events in 1993.

== Events ==
- 28 January: Journalist Nieves Herrero (in the reality show De tú a tú in Antena 3), interviews the parents of the murdered girls in the Alcácer Case the very same day their bodies are found, which unleashes a strong controversy and opens a debate on the limits of journalistic ethics.
- 24 May: First presidential debate in Spanish History between Felipe González and José María Aznar, in Antena 3, moderated by Manuel Campo Vidal.
- 31 May: Second presidential debate in Spanish History between Felipe González and José María Aznar, in Telecinco, moderated by Luis Mariñas. Next debate of this kind will take place after 15 years, in 2008.
- 9 October: Televisión Española stages in Valencia the OTI Festival 1993, which is broadcast live throughout Ibero-America. The song "Enamorarse", written by Alejandro Abad and Josep Llobell and performed by Ana Reverte representing Spain, wins the festival.
- December: TV channel Canal Hollywood launches.

== Debuts ==
Title	Channel	Debut	Performers/Host	Genre
A las ocho con Raffaella	TVE 1	1993-10-25	Raffaella Carrà	Quiz Show
A otra cosa	Antena 3	1993-09-28	Belén Rueda	Variety Show
Abierto por vacaciones	TVE 1	1993-08-02	Cruz y Raya	Comedy
Al filo de la ley	Antena 3	1993-04-29	Rosa María Mateo	News Magazine
Alatul	TVE 1	1993-04-11	Jaume Codina	Documentary
Arte y artistas	La 2	1993-01-30		Music
Bit a bit	La 2	1993-11-10	Guillem Caballé	Science/Culture
La boca del lobo	Antena 3	1993-02-15	Jesús Quintero	Talk Show
Bravo, bravísimo	Antena 3	1993-12-24	Teresa Rabal	Children
Burbujas	Antena 3	1993-07-17	Las Virtudes	Variety Show
Cámara baja	Antena 3	1993-06-25	Consuelo Berlanga	Children
La casa de la guasa	Telecinco	1993-11-29	Teresa Rabal	Children
Celia	TVE 1	1993-01-05	Cristina Cruz Mínguez	Sitcom
Cerca de ti	La 2	1993-06-11	Ramon Miravitllas	Talk Show
La chistera	Telecinco	1993-07-06	Eugenio	Comedy
Cifras y letras junior	La 2	1993-08-02	Elisenda Roca	Quiz Show
Los cinco sentidos	Antena 3	1993-07-19	Paloma Lago	Quiz Show
Cita con la vida	Antena 3	1993-10-05	Nieves Herrero	Talk Show
Código uno	TVE 1	1993-03-29	Arturo Pérez-Reverte	News Magazine
Con Hermida y compañía	Antena 3	1993-09-29	Jesús Hermida	Talk Show
La consulta de Rappel	Telecinco	1993-12-09	Rappel	Variety Show
Corazón, corazón	TVE 1	1993-07-04	Cristina García Ramos	Gossip Magazine
Date un respiro	Telecinco	1993-01-18	Laura Valenzuela	Variety Show
¿De parte de quién?	La 2	1993-11-30	Miguel Gila	Sitcom
Directamente pop	Telecinco	1993-08-08		Music
En los límites de la realidad	Antena 3	1993-06-14	Andrés Aberasturi	News Magazine
En primera	TVE 1	1993-01-26		News Magazine
Encantada de la vida	Antena 3	1993-10-01	Concha Velasco	Variety Show
Este país necesita un repaso	Telecinco	1993-11-10	José Luis Coll	Talk Show
Esto se anima	Antena 3	1993-06-07	Irma Soriano	Variety Show
Gente de Primera	TVE 1	1993-10-26	Iñaki Gabilondo	Talk Show
El gran juego de la oca	Antena 3	1993-10-02	Emilio Aragón	Game Show
Habitación 503	TVE 1	1993-09-13	Paco Cecilio	Sitcom
La batalla de las estrellas	Telecinco	1993-04-29	Bertín Osborne	Quiz Show
Los ladrones van a la oficina	Antena 3	1993-04-04	Fernando Fernán Gómez	Sitcom
Leer, ver...	La 2	1993-05-26		Drama Series
Leña al mono que es de goma	Antena 3	1993-07-12	Tony Aguilar	Youth
Línea América	Antena 3	1993-02-16	Minerva Piquero	Variety Show
Lingo	La 2	1993-07-06	Ramoncín	Quiz Show
Lleno, por favor	Antena 3	1993-10-04	Alfredo Landa	Sitcom
Lo que necesitas es amor	Antena 3	1993-10-12	Isabel Gemio	Reality Show
Mañana serán estrellas	Telecinco	1993-07-08	Carmen Sevilla	Talent show
Las mañanas de Tele 5	Telecinco	1993-10-13	Laura Valenzuela	Variety Show
El menú de Karlos Arguiñano	TVE 1	1993-10-26	Karlos Arguiñano	Cooking Show
Mesa de redacción	Telecinco	1993-04-14	Luis Mariñas	Talk Show
Misterios sin resolver	Telecinco	1993-03-27	Alfredo Amestoy	News Magazine
No me cortes	TVE 1	1993-07-05	César Heinrich	Youth
Noche de humor	La 2	1993-04-05		Comedy
Noche, noche	Antena 3	1993-02-06	Emilio Aragón	Variety Show
Noches de gala	TVE 1	1993-10-02	Joaquín Prat	Music
El orgullo del Tercer Mundo	La 2	1993-07-08	Faemino y Cansado	Comedy
Otra dimensión	Telecinco	1993-07-14	Félix Gracia	News Magazine
Oxígeno	La 2	1993-09-17	Francine Gálvez	Science/Culture
El peor programa de la semana	La 2	1993-01-01	El Gran Wyoming	Late night
Planeta Rock	La 2	1993-06-03	Tomás Fernando Flores	Music
Por tu salud	TVE 1	1993-06-08		Science/Culture
La primera respuesta	TVE 1	1993-03-01	Cristina Castillejos	Variety Show
¿Qué apostamos?	TVE 1	1993-05-04	Ramón García	Game Show
La ruleta de los jóvenes	Telecinco	1993-12-21	Jesús Vázquez	Quiz Show
Ruta Quetzal	TVE 1	1993-07-05	Miguel de la Quadra-Salcedo	Documentary
El sábado cocino yo	TVE 1	1993-01-21	Karlos Arguiñano	Cooking Show
¿Se puede?	Telecinco	1993-11-09	Carmen Sevilla	Variety Show
Solo para ti	Antena 3	1993-10-02	Bartolomé Beltrán	Science/Culture
Superboxeo	Antena 3	1993-04-02		Sport
Los suplementos	La 2	1993-07-11		Science/Culture
Tal cual	La 2	1993-02-16	Àngel Casas	Talk Show
La tele es tuya, colega	Telecinco	1993-10-20	Inma Brunton	Children
Todo va bien	Antena 3	1993-09-20	Pepe Navarro	Variety Show
Todos al circo	Antena 3	1993-12-24	Rody & Fofito	Children
Tras 3 tris	Antena 3	1993-09-27	Ana Chávarri	Children
Truhanes	Telecinco	1993-10-05	Paco Rabal	Sitcom
El turista habitual	Antena 3	1993-06-27	Jordi González	Quiz Show
Un día volveré	TVE 1	1993-10-19	Charo López	Drama Series
Una gloria nacional	TVE 1	1993-09-27	Francisco Rabal	Drama Series
Uno más en la familia	TVE 1	1993-09-18	Joaquín Arozamena	Science/Culture
Vacaciones animadas	Antena 3	1993-06-21		Children
Valor y coraje	TVE 1	1993-11-10	Constantino Romero	Reality Show
Ven a cantar	Telecinco	1993-07-05	María Abradelo	Music
Veraneando	Telecinco	1993-07-04	Bertín Osborne	Variety Show
¿Y tú de qué vas?	La 2	1993-12-06	Antonio Albert	Youth
Zona ACB	La 2	1993-12-13	Pedro Barthe	Sport
Zona de juego	TVE 1	1993-04-11	Benjamin Barrington	Youth

== Television shows ==
- La 1
  - Telediario (1957– )
  - Un, dos, tres... responda otra vez (1972–2004)
  - Estudio estadio (1972–2005)
  - Informe Semanal (1973– )
  - Parlamento (1978–2014)
  - El Precio justo (1988–2001)
  - Telepasión española (1990– )
  - La Mujer de tu vida (1990–1994)
  - No te rías, que es peor (1990–1995)
  - Club Disney (1990–1996)
  - Vídeos de primera (1990–1998)
  - Pasa la vida (1991–1996)
  - ¡Hola Raffaella! (1992–1994)
  - Quién sabe dónde (1992–1998)
- La 2
  - Al filo de lo imposble (1982– )
  - Pueblo de Dios (1982– )
  - Últimas preguntas (1983– )
  - En portada (1984– )
  - Estadio 2 (1984–2007)
  - Metrópolis (1985– )
  - Documentos TV (1986– )
  - Tendido cero (1986– )
  - Días de cine (1991– )
  - El rescate del talismán (1991–1994)
  - Clip, clap, video (1991–1995)
  - Cifras y Letras (1991–1996)
  - Línea 900 (1991–2007)
  - La Aventura del saber (1992– )
  - Jara y sedal (1992 -)
  - Tal cual (1992–1996)
  - Pinnic (1992–1998)
- Antena 3
  - Antena 3 Noticias (1990– )
  - La Merienda (1990–1994)
  - Farmacia de guardia (1991–1995)
- Telecinco
  - Informativos Telecinco (1990– )
  - Humor amarillo (1990–1995)
  - Su media naranja (1990–1996)
  - Telecupón (1990–1998)
  - Desayuna con alegría (1991–1994)
  - Vivan los novios (1991–1994)
  - Contacto con tacto (1992–1994)
- Canal+
  - El día después (1990–2005)
  - Redacción (1990–2005)
  - Del 40 al 1 (1991–1998)

== Ending this year ==
- La 1
  - Brigada Central (1989–1993)
  - Un Día es un día (1990–1993)
  - Ay, vida mía (1992–1993)
  - El Menú de cada día (1992–1993)
  - El Show de la una (1992–1993)
  - Sin vergüenza (1992–1993)
- La 2
  - La Tabla redonda (1990–1993)
  - La Vida es juego (1992–1993)
- Antena 3
  - De tú a tú (1990–1993)
  - La Guardería (1990–1993)
  - Viva la vida (1991–1993)
  - Al ataque (1992–1993
  - Con ustedes...Pedro Ruiz (1992–1993)
  - Los Domingos por Norma (1992–1993)
  - La Noche de Hermida (1992–1993)
  - Queremos saber (1992–1993)
  - Sabor a Lolas (1992–1993)
  - El Superjuego (1992–1993)
  - Vaya fauna (1992–1993)
  - Vivir, vivir...que bonito (1992–1993)
- Telecinco
  - Bellezas al agua (1990–1993)
  - Entre platos anda el juego (1990–1993)
  - Hablando se entiende la gente (1990–1993)
  - La Quinta marcha (1990–1993)
  - A mediodía, alegría (1991–1993)
  - Hablando se entiende la basca (1991–1993)
  - Humor cinco estrellas (1991–1993)
  - Superguay (1991–1993)
  - Goles son amores (1992–1993)
  - Querida Concha (1992–1993)

== Changes of network affiliation ==
Show	Moved From	Moved To
La ruleta de la fortuna (1990– )	Antena 3	Telecinco

== Foreign series debuts in Spain ==
English title	Spanish title	Original title	Channel	Country	Performers
Baby Boom	Baby Boom		FORTA	USA	Kate Jackson
Baby M	Baby M.		Antena 3	USA	JoBeth Williams
Batman: The Animated Series	Batman: La serie animada		Canal +	USA	
Beyond Reality	Más allá de la realidad		Antena 3	USA CAN	Shari Belafonte
Bionic Six	Bionic Six la familia biónica		FORTA	USA	
Catwalk	Catwalk		Antena 3	CAN	Neve Campbell
Charlie Hoover	Charlie Hoover		Canal +	USA	Tim Matheson
---	Tres fantasmitas	Chiisana Obake Acchi, Kocchi, Socchi	Canal +	JAP	
---	La quinta de hierro	Classe di ferro	Telecinco	USA	Gianpiero Ingrassia
Counterstrike	Contragolpe		Antena 3	USA	Simon MacCorkindale
Covington Cross	Covington Cross		Canal +	USA	Nigel Terry
Crossbow	Guillermo Tell		La 1	USA	Will Lyman
Dangerous Curves	Curvas peligrosas		Telecinco	USA	Lise Cutter
Dark Shadows	Vampiros		La 1	USA	Ben Cross
Defenders of the Earth	Defensores de la Tierra		FORTA	USA	
Dinosaurs	Dinosaurios		La 1	USA	
Dog City	Dog City		Canal +	USA	
Doraemon	Doraemon		FORTA	JAP	
Doug	Doug		Canal +	USA	
Dragon Quest: The Adventure of Dai	Dragon Quest: Las aventuras de Fly	Doragon Kuesuto: Dai no Daibōken	FORTA	JAP	
---	Yedra	Edera	La 1	ITA	Agnese Nano
---	Alto riesgo	Extrême Limite	Telecinco	FRA	Arsène Jiroyan
Ferris Bueller	Chico listo		Telecinco	USA	Charlie Schlatter
Foofur	Foofur		FORTA	USA	
G-Force: Guardians of Space	Fuerza G: Guardianes del espacio		FORTA	JAP	
Golden Years	Años dorados		La 2	USA	Keith Szarabajka
Grisù	Grisu, el pequeño dragón	Draghetto Grisu	FORTA	ITA	
Halfway Across the Galaxy and Turn Left	Bajando a la galaxia de la izquierda		Antena 3	AUS	Lauren Hewett
---	Alta tensión	Haute tension	La 2	FRA	Jacques Perrin
Homefront	Regreso a casa		La 1	USA	Kyle Chandler
---	La Bola de Dan	Honō no Tōkyūji: Dodge Danpei	Telecinco	JAP	
Hooperman	Hooperman		Telecinco	USA	John Ritter
House of Cards	Castillo de naipes		Antena 3	UK	Ian Richardson
I'll Fly Away	Tiempo de conflictos		La 2	USA	Sam Waterston
Kassandra	Kassandra		La 1	VEN	Coraima Torres
Key West	Key West		Telecinco	USA	Fisher Stevens
---	La mujer sin rostro	La mujer sin rostro	La 1	VEN	Flor Núñez
Law & Order	Ley y orden		La 1	USA	George Dzundza
Lenny	Lenny		La 2	USA	Lenny Clarke
Let the Blood Run Free	Deja la sangre correr		Canal +	AUS	Jean Kittson
Little Dracula	Draculin	Draculito, mon saigneur	La 1	FRA GER	
Love & War	El Trébol Azul		Canal +	USA	Susan Dey
---	Dime Luna	Lua Cheia de Amor	La 2	BRA	Marília Pêra
Mad About You	Loco por ti		FORTA	USA	Paul Reiser, Helen Hunt
Mistral's Daughter	La hija de Mistral		Antena 3	USA	Stefanie Powers, Stacy Keach
Mr. Bean	Mr. Bean		FORTA	UK	Rowan Atkinson
Musti	Musti		FORTA	BEL	
My Little Star	Estrellita mía		La 1	ARG	Andrea del Boca
Northern Exposure	Doctor en Alaska		La 2	USA	Rob Morrow
Pandamonium	Pandamonium		FORTA	USA	
Parenthood	Dulce hogar...a veces		La 1	USA	David Arquette
Parker Lewis Can't Lose	Parker Lewis nunca pierde		FORTA	USA	Corin Nemec
---	Pobre diabla	Pobre diabla	La 1	ARG	Jeannette Rodríguez
Prime Suspect	Principal sospechoso		Antena 3	USA	Maria Bello
Private Benjamin	La recluta Benjamin		Antena 3	USA	Lorna Patterson
Ronin Warriors	Los Cinco Samráis	Yoroiden Samurai Torūpā	Telecinco	JAP	
Rugrats	Ricos y mocosos		Canal +	USA	
Scarecrow and Mrs. King	El espantapájaros y la señora King		FORTA	USA	Kate Jackson, Bruce Boxleitner
She's the Sheriff	La mujer sheriff		Antena 3	USA	Suzanne Somers
Silk Stalkings	Medias de seda		FORTA	USA	Rob Estes, Mitzi Kapture
Street Justice	Justicia callejera		FORTA	USA	Carl Weathers
The Adventures of Don Coyote and Sancho Panda	Don Coyote y Sancho Panda		Canal +	USA ITA	
The Adventures of T-Rex	T-Rex		Canal +	USA	Kathleen Barr
The Bill	Policía de barrio		La 2	UK	Peter Cregeen
The Charlie Brown and Snoopy Show	Charlie Brown		La 1	USA	
The Flash	Flash, el relámpago humano		La 1	USA	John Wesley Shipp
The Jackie Thomas Show	The Jackie Thomas Show		Canal +	USA	Tom Arnold
The New Adventures of Black Beauty	El corcel negro		Telecinco	NZL	Stacy Dorning
The Odyssey	La odisea		Canal +	CAN	Illya Woloshyn
The Old Fox	El viejo policía	Der Alte	La 1	GER	Siegfried Lowitz
The Ren & Stimpy Show	Ren y Stimpy		Canal +	USA	
Time Riders	Los navegantes		Canal +	USA	Haydn Gwynne
Tiny Toon Adventures	Los Tiny Toon		La 2	USA	
Toxic Crusaders	Los vengadores tóxicos		FORTA	USA	
Under Cover	Misiones secretas		La 1	USA	Anthony Denison
War and Remembrance	Recuerdos de guerra		Telecinco	USA	Robert Mitchum
Wish Me Luck	Deséame suerte		FORTA	UK	Jane Asher
Yellowthread Street	La ley de Hong Kong		Antena 3	USA	Ray Lonnen
---	Diga 33	Zeg 'ns Aaa	La 1	NED	Sjoukje Hooymaayer
Zorro	Zorro		La 1	USA	Duncan Regehr

== Births ==
- 19 January – Jesús Castro, actor.
- 20 January – Alexia Rivas, pundit.
- 21 July – Santiago Crespo, actor

== Deaths ==
- 12 June – Manuel Summers, director y guionista, 57.
- 4 July – Lola Gaos, actress, 71.

== See also ==
- 1993 in Spain
- List of Spanish films of 1993
