= Lo que escondían sus ojos =

2016 Spanish romance television miniseries

- Genre: Romantic drama
- Based on: Lo que escondían sus ojos by Nieves Herrero
- Screenplay by: Helena Medina
- Directed by: Salvador Calvo
- Starring: Blanca Suárez; Rubén Cortada; Emilio Gutiérrez Caba; Loreto Mauleón; Javier Gutiérrez; Pepa Aniorte; Javier Rey; Antonio Pagudo; Charlotte Vega; Belinda Washington; David Solans; Verónika Moral
- Country of origin: Spain
- Original language: Spanish
- No. of seasons: 1
- No. of episodes: 4

Production
- Cinematography: Felipe Alba
- Production company: MOD Producciones

Original release
- Network: Telecinco
- Release: 22 November – 20 December 2016

Lo que escondían sus ojos is a Spanish romance television miniseries directed by Salvador Calvo adapting the novel of the same name by Nieves Herrero, which focuses on the adulterous love story between Sonsoles Icaza and Ramón Serrano Suñer. It stars Blanca Suárez and Rubén Cortada. While successful in terms of audience, the miniseries, with limited historical rigor, was decried as a banalization of the Francoist regime and the figure of Serrano Suñer in particular. It aired in 2016 on Telecinco.

== Premise ==
Set in between Madrid and San Sebastián, the plot concerns the adulterous love story between Ramón Serrano Suñer (Rubén Cortada) —Minister of Foreign Affairs of the Francoist regime, married to Zita Polo (Loreto Mauleón), and co-brother-in law of Francisco Franco (Javier Gutiérrez)— and Sonsoles de Icaza (Blanca Suárez) —the Marquise of Llanzol, married to the older Francisco de Paula Díez de Rivera (Emilio Gutiérrez Caba)—, (Note: Francisco de Paula Díez de Rivera was roughly 24 years older than Sonsoles de Icaza, while Emilio Gutiérrez Caba is more than 40 years older than Blanca Suárez.) after they meet in 1942 in a gala at the Hotel Ritz.

== Cast ==
Main

- Blanca Suárez as Sonsoles de Icaza, Marquise of Llanzol.
- Rubén Cortada as Ramón Serrano Suñer, Francisco Franco's co-brother-in-law and Minister of Foreign Affairs.
- Emilio Gutiérrez Caba as Francisco de Paula Díez de Rivera, Marquis of Llanzol, Sonsoles' husband.
- Charlotte Vega as Carmen Díez de Rivera, Sonsoles de Icaza's daughter.
- Javier Gutiérrez as Francisco Franco.
- Pepa Aniorte as Carmen Polo, Francisco Franco's wife.
- Loreto Mauleón as Zita Polo, Serrano Suñer's wife and Carmen Polo's sister.
- Javier Rey as Cristóbal Balenciaga.
- Antonio Pagudo as Dionisio Ridruejo.
- Víctor Clavijo as Antonio Tovar.
- Verónika Moral as Carmen de Icaza, Sonsoles de Icaza's sister.
- David Solans as Ramón Serrano Polo.
- Cristina de Inza as Beatriz de León y Loynaz, Sonsoles de Icaza's mother.
- Pepa Rus as Matilde, Sonsoles de Icaza's lady-in-waiting.
- Carlos Santos as Emilio, Matilde's best friend.
- Ricardo de Barreiro as Juan, the butler at Llanzol's mansion.
- Aïda Ballmann as Hilde, a governess.
- Carolina Meijer as Olivia, a governess.
- Belinda Washington as Pura Huétor, sister-in-law of the Marquises of Lanzol.
- Ben Temple as Samuel Hoare, British Ambassador in Spain.

== Production ==
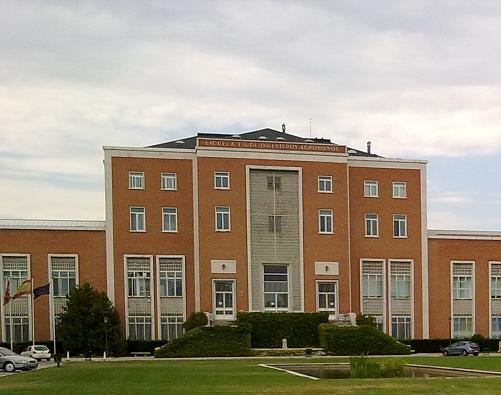
The Escuela Técnica Superior de Ingenieros Agrónomos was used to represent the headquarters of the Francoist Ministry of Foreign Affairs.

Lo que escondían sus ojos was based on the novel of the same name by Nieves Herrero. Produced by MOD Producciones (a subsidiary of Mediaset España) and scripted by Helena Medina, the miniseries was directed by Salvador Calvo. Felipe Alba was charged with the cinematography direction whereas Marcelo Pacheco worked in the art direction.

With key settings in the fiction consisting of Madrid and San Sebastián, production worked both in the Spanish capital and San Sebastián as well as in El Espinar (province of Segovia). Shooting locations in Madrid included the Quinta de El Pardo, San Jerónimo el Real, the Basilica of San Francisco el Grande, the Centro Cultural de los Ejércitos, the Escuela Técnica Superior de Ingenieros Agrónomos and the Palace of Santoña. Shooting locations in San Sebastián included the Beach of La Concha and the Palace of Miramar.

== Release and reception ==
The 4-part miniseries premiered on 22 November 2016, earning a 19.3% audience share. The broadcasting run ended on 20 December 2016. It commanded "great" viewership ratings, averaging 3.2 million viewers and a 18.9% share.

Lo que escondían sus ojos was decried as a banalization of the Francoist dictatorship and the figure of Serrano Suñer in particular, then Minister of Foreign Affairs, Franco's right-hand (he was known at the height of his power as Ministro Presidente, "Minister-President") and a prominent Philo-Nazi figure within the regime: his actions include the elaboration of the legislation enabling the seizure of information that allowed for the imprisonment and killing of thousands of former members of parties, trade unions and Republican associations and a deal reached with Heinrich Himmler on Gestapo–Spanish police collaboration to repatriate Republican exiles, none of which is palpably dealt with in the fiction.

According to the analysis of Rúa Fernández & Rúa Fernández (2021), "the result is highly complacent with one of the most repressive dictatorships of the 20th century in Europe, as well as with one of its most important representatives in its darkest period".

Mediaset (Italy) purchased the rights for the broadcasting in Italy. The miniseries aired for the first time on Canale 5 under the title Quello che nascondono i tuoi occhi from 3 January 2017 to 15 January 2017.

Series	Episodes	Originally released			Viewers	Share (%)	Ref.
Series	Episodes	First released	Last released	Network	Viewers	Share (%)	Ref.
1	4	22 November 2016	20 December 2016	Telecinco	3.200.000	18.9	

No. in season	Title	Directed by	Written by	Viewers	Original release date	Share (%)
1	"Dos mundos opuestos"	Salvador Calvo	Helena Medina	3,348,000	22 November 2016	19.3
2	"A corazón abierto"	Salvador Calvo	Helena Medina	3,213,000	29 November 2016	18.7
3	"Un secreto a voces"	Salvador Calvo	Helena Medina	3,129,000	13 December 2016	18.4
4	"El mundo en nuestra contra"	Salvador Calvo	Helena Medina	3,111,000	20 December 2016	19.2

== Awards and nominations ==
Year	Award	Category	Nominee(s)	Result	Ref.
2017	64th Ondas Awards	Best Actress	Blanca Suárez	Won	
2017	19th Iris Awards	Best Actress	Blanca Suárez	Nominated	
2017	5th MiM Series Awards	Best Miniseries or TV Movie		Nominated	
