= The Good Manners =

- Theatrical release poster
- Spanish: La buena letra
- Directed by: Celia Rico Clavellino
- Screenplay by: Celia Rico Clavellino
- Based on: La buena letra by Rafael Chirbes
- Produced by: Fernando Bovaira
- Starring: Loreto Mauleón; Enric Auquer Sardà; Roger Casamajor; Ana Rujas
- Cinematography: Sara Gallego
- Edited by: Andrés Gil
- Music by: Marina Alcantud
- Production companies: Misent Producciones; MOD Producciones; Arcadia Motion Pictures
- Distributed by: Caramel Films
- Release dates: 15 March 2025 (Málaga); 30 April 2025 (Spain)
- Country: Spain
- Languages: Spanish; Catalan

The Good Manners (Spanish: La buena letra), also known as The Good Handwriting, is a 2025 Spanish historical drama film written and directed by Celia Rico Clavellino based on the novel by Rafael Chirbes. It stars Loreto Mauleón, Enric Auquer, Roger Casamajor, and Ana Rujas.

== Plot ==
Set in a Valencian village against the backdrop of the austerity of the post-War period, the plot tracks the plight of Ana and her family, as the Civil War have left them deeply wounded. Muddling through work despite being in the vanquished side of the War, Ana and her husband Tomás protect Tomás' mother's psyche by delivering her letters impersonating the latter's younger son Antonio (reported missing), written by Ana imitating Antonio's calligraphy so the old woman believes her son is in exile in Argentina. With Antonio's eventual show up and his engagement to Isabel, the family fabric is shattered, as Ana sees her brother-in-law prosper without working hard and by making deals with Francoists.

== Cast ==
- Loreto Mauleón as Ana
- Enric Auquer as Antonio
- Roger Casamajor as Tomás
- Ana Rujas as Isabel
- Teresa Lozano as María
- Gloria March as Concha
- Sofía Puerta as Anita

== Production ==
The film is a Misent Producciones, MOD Producciones, and Arcadia Motion Pictures production, with the participation of RTVE, Movistar Plus+, and 3Cat and À Punt, and funding from ICAA, ICEC, and IVC. Sara Gallego served as director of photography, using an Alexa 35. Shooting locations in the Valencian Community included Petrés and Segorbe. It features dialogue in Spanish and Valencian (Catalan).

== Release ==
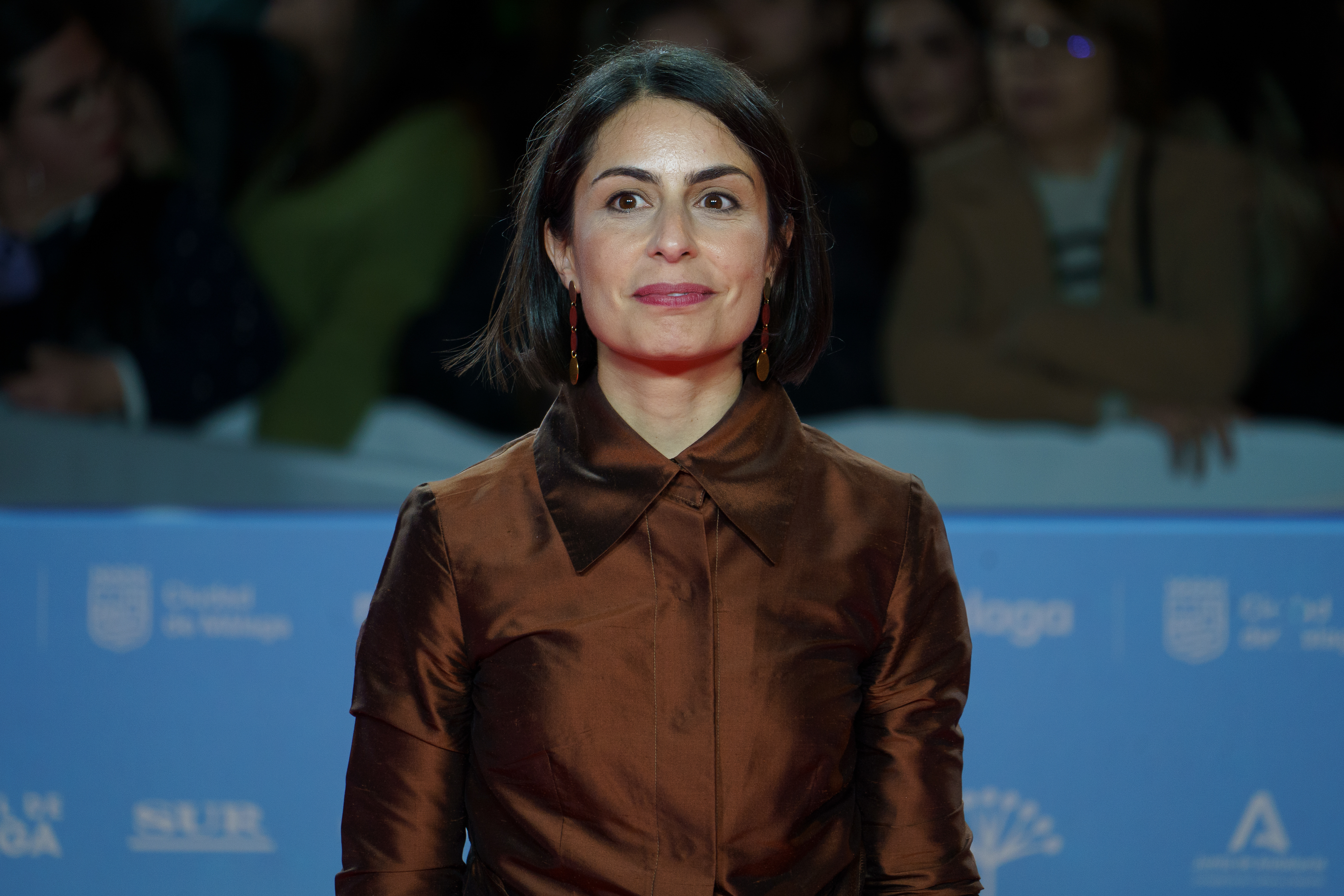
Celia Rico at the red carpet of the 28th Málaga Film Festival on 15 March 2025

The film was presented at the 28th Málaga Film Festival on 15 March 2025 in competition for the Golden Biznaga. It also made it to the non-competitive strand of the 9th BCN Film Fest's official selection. It is scheduled to be released theatrically in Spain on 30 April 2025 by Caramel Films.

== Reception ==
Elsa Fernández-Santos of El País assessed that Rico nails the adaptation of Chirbes' work, from the simplicity and emotion of the film's script to the careful direction of actors.

Reviewing in La Razón, Sergi Sánchez rated the film 4½ out of 5 stars, praising "the sensitivity of Rico's gaze, the powerful female portrayal and the work of all the performers".

Raquel Hernández Luján of HobbyConsolas gave the film 85 points ('very good') summing up the film as "a small masterpiece that transcends costumbrismo to deliver a precise and precious audiovisual piece", also writing about a "sublime" Mauleón.

Philipp Engel of Cinemanía rated the film 3½ stars, writing that "the intimate and the political are once again skillfully intertwined, and the cast is also quite appropriate", while noting that "the tragic end prevents the epiphany".

== Accolades ==
Year	Award	Category	Nominee(s)	Result	Ref.
2025	8th Lola Gaos Awards	Best Film		Nominated	
2025	8th Lola Gaos Awards	Best Screenplay	Celia Rico	Nominated	
2025	8th Lola Gaos Awards	Best Costume Design	Giovanna Ribes	Nominated	
2025	8th Lola Gaos Awards	Best Makeup and Hairstyles	Esther Guillem, Pilar Guillem	Won	
2025	8th Lola Gaos Awards	Best Production Supervision	Lorena Lluch	Won	
2026	5th Carmen Awards	Best Director	Celia Rico	Nominated	
2026	5th Carmen Awards	Best Adapted Screenplay	Celia Rico	Nominated	
2026	18th Gaudí Awards	Best Adapted Screenplay	Celia Rico	Nominated	
2026	40th Goya Awards	Best Adapted Screenplay	Celia Rico Clavellino	Nominated	

== See also ==
- List of Spanish films of 2025
