= El Señor de los Cielos season 8 =

El Señor de los Cielos
- Season 8
- Starring: Rafael Amaya; Rubén Cortada; Carmen Aub; Iván Arana; África Zavala; Isabella Castillo; Yuri Vargas; Alejandro López
- No. of episodes: 88

Release
- Original network: Telemundo
- Original release: 17 January – 22 May 2023

Season chronology
- ← Previous; Season 7 Next → Season 9

The eighth season of the American television series El Señor de los Cielos was announced on 15 February 2022. The season is directed by Juan Carlos Valdivia, Conrado Martínez, Mauricio Meneses, and Bernardo Mota, with Karen Barroeta, Ximena Cantuarias, and Harold Sánchez serving as executive producers.

The season premiered on 17 January 2023 and concluded on 22 May 2023.

== Plot ==
The season centers on the return of Aurelio Casillas, who supposedly died at the beginning of the previous season after falling into a coma following an attempt on his life. It is only the DEA who knows that Aurelio is alive, having hidden him in the desert. In enacting his plan of revenge, Aurelio establishes connections with old allies, while also facing new romances and uncovering family mysteries.

== Cast ==
=== Main ===
- Rafael Amaya as Aurelio Casillas
- Rubén Cortada as Fernando Aguirre
- Carmen Aub as Rutila Casillas
- Iván Arana as Ismael Casillas
- África Zavala as Mecha de la Cruz
- Isabella Castillo as Diana Ahumada
- Yuri Vargas as Tracy Lobo
- Alejandro López as El Súper Javi

=== Recurring ===
- Lisa Owen as Alba Casillas
- Robinson Díaz as Miltón Jiménez "El Cabo"
- Salvador Pineda as Julio Zambrana
- Karla Carrillo as Corina Saldaña
- Thali García as Berenice Ahumada
- Alan Slim as Jaime Ernesto Rosales
- Karen Sandoval as Laura Casillas
- Wendy de los Cobos as Aguasanta "Tata" Guerra
- Denia Agalianou as Dalila Zuc
- Carlos Corona as Rigoberto Alfaro
- Daniel Martínez as Guillermo Colón
- José Sedek as Bernardo Castillo
- Daniel Martínez Campos as Arístides Istúriz
- Renata Manterola as Luzma Casillas
- Mimi Morales as Said
- Jorge Cárdenas as Alan Saade
- Maricela González as Eunice Lara "La Felina"
- Elsy Reyes as Carla Uzcátegui
- Roberto Escobar as Commander José Valdés
- Sebastián González as Benjamín
- Brenda Hanst as Caridad Mendoza
- Leonardo Álvarez as Leonardo Castaño
- Carlos Balderrama as José Manuel Castillo "Manny"
- Fernando Banda as El Vitaminas
- Gabriel Bonilla as Isidro Casillas
- Emilio Chabre as Chemita Venegas
- Alejandro Félix as Chatarrero
- Fede Gallardo as Esteban
- Martijn Kuiper as Lucas Manzano
- Alejandro Navarrete as El Zopilote
- David Ponce as José Manrique "Skinny"
- Carlos Puente as Pompeyo
- Roberto Valdez as JP
- Alex Walerstein as Paul "El Greñas"

== Episodes ==
No. overall	No. in season	Title	Original release date	US viewers (millions)
612 613	1	"Resurrección"	17 January 2023 (Note: This episode originally aired as a single double-length episode.)	1.62
614	2	"Por compasión"	18 January 2023	1.62
615	3	"Debilidades"	19 January 2023	1.62
616	4	"El tiempo se agota"	20 January 2023	1.44
617	5	"Muerte en el funeral"	23 January 2023	1.38
618	6	"Tragedia familiar"	24 January 2023	1.64
619	7	"Desde la ultratumba"	25 January 2023	1.71
620	8	"Sobrenatural"	26 January 2023	1.75
621	9	"Código Lázaro"	27 January 2023	1.70
622	10	"La leyenda que camina"	30 January 2023	1.46
623	11	"Doble agente"	31 January 2023	1.42
624	12	"Caras vemos..."	1 February 2023	1.38
625	13	"La mejor defensa es el ataque"	2 February 2023	1.51
626	14	"Borrar el pasado"	3 February 2023	1.41
627	15	"Por la familia"	6 February 2023	1.36
628	16	"¿Mujer decente o traficante?"	8 February 2023	1.28
629	17	"No te equivoques"	9 February 2023	1.20
630	18	"Soy el señor de los cielos"	10 February 2023	1.28
631	19	"Sed de venganza"	13 February 2023	1.21
632	20	"Territorio ajeno"	14 February 2023	1.29
633	21	"Ni una bala más"	15 February 2023	1.35
634	22	"Deber de padre"	16 February 2023	1.23
635	23	"No le entro"	17 February 2023	1.30
636	24	"Todopoderoso"	20 February 2023	1.42
637	25	"Peligro inminente"	21 February 2023	1.30
638	26	"El rastro"	22 February 2023	1.23
639	27	"Amor en llamas"	23 February 2023	1.20
640	28	"Esto no es para mí"	24 February 2023	1.28
641	29	"Tú propones, yo dispongo"	27 February 2023	1.22
642	30	"La jugada perfecta"	28 February 2023	1.09
643	31	"Lo vas a pagar con sangre"	1 March 2023	1.20
644	32	"Soberana esencia"	2 March 2023	1.29
645	33	"Sexto sentido"	3 March 2023	1.11
646	34	"Dormir con el enemigo"	6 March 2023	1.16
647	35	"Por la boca muere el pez"	7 March 2023	1.11
648	36	"Viejas conocidas"	8 March 2023	1.15
649	37	"Consejos maternales"	9 March 2023	1.13
650	38	"La despedida"	10 March 2023	1.10
651	39	"Cubrir necesidades"	13 March 2023	1.09
652	40	"Cambio de planes"	14 March 2023	1.08
653	41	"Contra reloj"	15 March 2023	1.03
654	42	"No te vayas Corina"	16 March 2023	1.15
655	43	"Emergencia en el aire"	17 March 2023	0.93
656	44	"Aprender a volar"	20 March 2023	1.15
657	45	"Más que un deseo, una realidad"	21 March 2023	1.04
658	46	"Silencio a cualquier precio"	22 March 2023	1.15
659	47	"Amor sin fronteras"	23 March 2023	1.27
660	48	"El punto débil de Casillas"	24 March 2023	1.10
661	49	"Desconectados de la realidad"	27 March 2023	1.13
662	50	"Propuesta en el paraíso"	28 March 2023	1.04
663	51	"Esto es la vida real"	29 March 2023	1.01
664	52	"Instinto asesino"	30 March 2023	1.06
665	53	"Aurelio sale a cazar"	31 March 2023	1.09
666	54	"Todo apunta a Ismael"	3 April 2023	1.07
667	55	"Presión al más alto nivel"	4 April 2023	1.13
668	56	"Seré tu protector"	5 April 2023	1.21
669	57	"Ajuste de cuentas"	6 April 2023	1.14
670	58	"Infiltrado"	10 April 2023	1.20
671	59	"La venganza de Super Javi"	11 April 2023	0.98
672	60	"A mí no me engañas"	12 April 2023	1.09
673	61	"Doble cara"	13 April 2023	1.16
674	62	"Cabos sueltos"	14 April 2023	0.97
675	63	"Una nueva ilusión"	17 April 2023	1.04
676	64	"A mi manera"	18 April 2023	1.09
677	65	"Javi alborota el avispero"	19 April 2023	0.98
678	66	"Visita sorpresa en Miraflores"	20 April 2023	1.04
679	67	"Donde manda capitán..."	21 April 2023	0.93
680	68	"Urge el silencio"	24 April 2023	0.93
681	69	"Con el último aliento"	25 April 2023	1.06
682	70	"La elegida"	26 April 2023	1.03
683	71	"El Milagrito"	27 April 2023	1.05
684	72	"La sangre llama"	28 April 2023	1.03
685	73	"Sube y baja el telón"	1 May 2023	1.03
686	74	"Enemigo compartido"	2 May 2023	0.98
687	75	"Refuerzos para Tijuana"	3 May 2023	0.99
688	76	"Viviré en tus sueños"	4 May 2023	1.04
689	77	"Cómplices a la fuerza"	5 May 2023	1.04
690	78	"Nada es imposible"	8 May 2023	1.16
691	79	"Fuera de control"	9 May 2023	1.05
692	80	"La mejor carnada"	10 May 2023	0.98
693	81	"La trampa"	11 May 2023	1.05
694	82	"Ojos por todos lados"	12 May 2023	0.96
695	83	"La fiera que hay en ti"	15 May 2023	1.05
696	84	"Una mentira tras otra"	16 May 2023	1.13
697	85	"En bandeja de plata"	17 May 2023	1.14
698	86	"Interceptada"	18 May 2023	1.07
699	87	"El títere de Zambrana"	19 May 2023	0.93
700 701	88	"Batalla frontal"	22 May 2023	1.30

== Production ==
On 15 February 2022, Telemundo announced that it had revived El Señor de los Cielos for an eighth season. In May 2022, a teaser of the season was presented during Telemundo's upfront for the 2022–2023 television season. Filming of the season began on 20 September 2022, with a list of new and returning cast members being announced the same day.
