= Cremation (novel) =

2007 novel by Rafael Chirbes

- Author: Rafael Chirbes
- Original title: Crematorio
- Translator: Valerie Miles
- Language: Spanish
- Publisher: Editorial Anagrama
- Publication date: 3 September 2007
- Publication place: Spain
- English publication date: 2 November 2021
- Pages: 424
- ISBN: 978-84-339-7156-2

Cremation (Spanish: Crematorio) is a 2007 novel by the Spanish writer Rafael Chirbes. The story revolves around a businessman and his recently deceased younger brother. It is divided into 13 main sections, each consisting of one long paragraph written from the perspective of a different character.

Kirkus Reviews wrote that the "prose can be dense and disorienting but it's always intelligent". The book is the basis for the 2011 television series Crematorio.
