= My Wife Is a Ghost =

- Theatrical release poster
- Spanish: El fantasma de mi mujer
- Directed by: Maria Ripoll
- Screenplay by: German Aparicio; Araceli Álvarez de Sotomayor; Olga Iglesias; María Ripoll
- Story by: Germán Aparicio
- Produced by: Gustavo Ferrada; Winnie Baert; Francisco Sánchez Ortiz; Arnauld de Battice
- Starring: Javier Rey; Loreto Mauleón; María Hervás; Marco Cáceres; Macarena Gómez
- Cinematography: Joan Bordera
- Edited by: Nacho Ruiz Capillas
- Music by: Zacarías Martínez de la Riva
- Production companies: Mediacrest Entertainment; Ciudadano CISKUL; AT Production
- Distributed by: A Contracorriente Films
- Release date: 20 February 2026 (Spain)
- Countries: Spain; Belgium
- Language: Spanish

My Wife Is a Ghost (Spanish: El fantasma de mi mujer) is a 2026 comedy film directed by Maria Ripoll starring Javier Rey, Loreto Mauleón, and María Hervás. It is a Spanish-Belgian co-production.

== Plot ==
Julia, the mistress of Fernando, apparently kills Fernando's wife María in an accident, asking for his help to get rid of the body. After telling the police that his wife had left him, Fernando however does not stop hearing and seeing María.

== Cast ==
- Javier Rey as Fernando
- Loreto Mauleón as María
- María Hervás as Julia
- Marco Cáceres as inspector Lorenzo
- Judit Martín as inspectora Rueda
- Carlos Vicente as comisario Farré
- Macarena Gómez as Teresa

== Production ==
The screenplay was written by Germán Aparicio, Araceli Álvarez de Sotomayor, Olga Iglesias, and María Ripoll based on an original story by Germán Aparicio. The Spanish-Belgian film was produced by Mediacrest Aries, AIE – Mediacrest Entertainment, Ciudadano CISKUL and AT Production, and it had the participation of RTVE, Movistar Plus+, Netflix, and 3Cat.

== Release ==
Distributed by A Contracorriente Films, the film was released theatrically in Spain on 20 February 2026.

== Reception ==
Javier Ocaña of Cinemanía rated the film 2½ of out 5 stars, lamenting that in the end the film, modelled after American screwball comedies from the 1930s and 1940s, "just feels like another lacklustre Spanish commercial comedy".

Elsa Fernández-Santos of El País assessed that the madcap comedy struggles to find its tone, singling out "the notion of unintended revenge" and the awakening of Mauleón's character as the best elements about the film.

Pablo Vázquez of Fotogramas rated the film 3 out of 5 stars, pointing out that My Wife Is a Ghost is elegantly brought to screen by Ripoll but also lamenting that at some point that the film, "which never fails to entertain, loses its ability to subvert and unsettle".

== See also ==
- List of Spanish films of 2026
