= Rubén Cortada =

Cuban actor and model

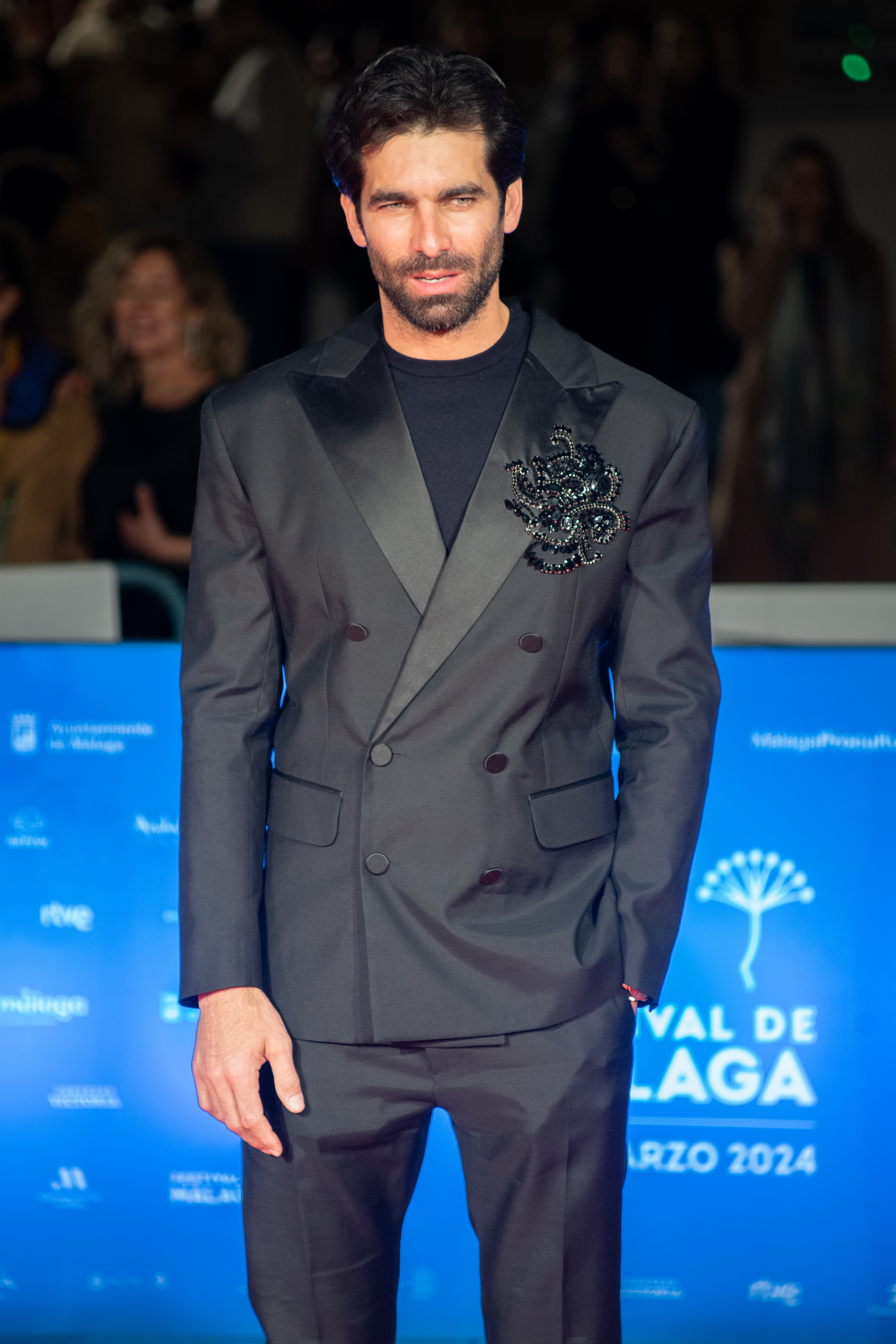
- Cortada in 2024
- Born: Jorge Rubén Cortada Soto; 6 October 1984 (age 41); Isla de la Juventud, Cuba
- Partner: Susana Pino (2014–present)
- Children: 1
- Modelling information
- Height: 6 ft 2 in (188 cm)
- Hair colour: Black
- Eye colour: Green
- Agency: New Madison Models

Jorge Rubén Cortada Soto (born 6 October 1984) is a Cuban and Spanish actor and model.

== Early life ==
Cortada was born in Isla de la Juventud, Cuba, on 6 October 1984. His father was a hydraulic engineer and his mother was a microbiologist.

He studied at La Lenin, an academically selective boarding school in Havana. He credits his literature professor at the school for his decision to become an actor. His first experiences as an actor were in two plays in Cuba under Humberto Rodríguez's command. After that, he trained with the Argentinian master Fernando Piernas (gambe). He later enrolled in an Aeronautical Engineering degree at the University of Havana. He left his studies to pursue an international modelling career by relocating to Spain.

== Career ==
As a model, Cortada has worked for well-known fashion houses such as Dolce & Gabbana, Armani and Jean Paul Gaultier.

In 2014, he began playing Faruq in the hit television series, El Príncipe on Telecinco.

In 2023, he joined the cast of the eighth season of El Señor De Los Cielos, a hit series on Telemundo, an American Spanish-language channel.

== Personal life ==
Since 2014, he has been in a relationship with the Cuban model, Susana Pino, with whom he shares a daughter. The pair first met as adolescents when they were both studying at La Lenin in Havana.

== Filmography ==
TV series
Year	Title	Role	Notes
2011–2012	Bandolera	Jorge Infante	Recurring role
2013	El tiempo entre costuras	Ramiro Arribas	Recurring role
2014–2015	El Príncipe	Faruq Ben Barek	Main cast
2015–2016	Olmos y Robles	Inspector Agustín Robles	Main cast
2016	Lo que escondían sus ojos	Ramón Serrano Suñer	Lead role
2023	El Señor de los Cielos	Fernando Aguirre	Main cast (season 8)
