= Loreto Mauleón =

Spanish actress (born 1988)

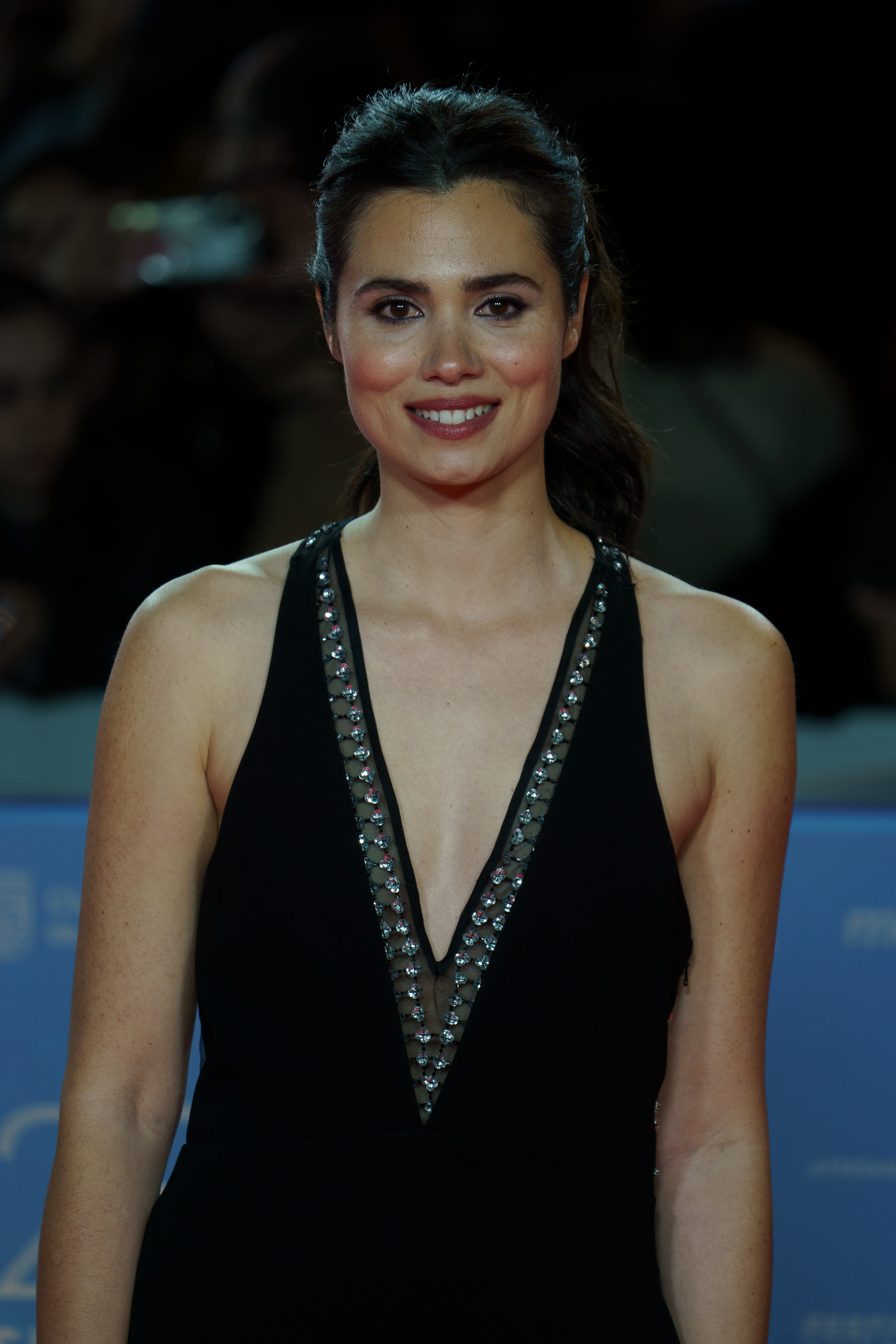
- Mauleón in 2025
- Born: 14 August 1988 (age 38); Burgos, Spain
- Occupation: Actress

Loreto Mauleón (born 14 August 1988) is a Spanish actress. Early recognisable to a Basque audience for her performance in the soap opera Goenkale, she became known to a wider Spanish audience for her performances in El secreto de Puente Viejo and Patria. She has since featured in television series such as Express, The Snow Girl, and Querer and films such as God's Crooked Lines (2022) and La buena letra (2025).

== Early life and education ==
Loreto Mauleón was born in Burgos on 14 August 1988, but, when she was just seven months old, moved to San Sebastián

She studied at the ikastola Zurriola and the Peñaflorida high school in San Sebastián, before studying public works at the University of the Basque Country.

== Career ==
Mauleón performed in four seasons of the Basque soap opera Goenkale. Her debut in a feature film came with a role in La máquina de pintar nubes (2009).

In 2012, she joined the cast of the second season of El secreto de Puente Viejo, performing the role of María Castañeda, which brought her public recognition. The character stopped appearing in the series in January 2015, after more than 600 episodes. Mauleón then starred in the Basque period drama series Aitaren Etxea and performed the role of Zita Polo in the miniseries Lo que escondían sus ojos. Mauleón returned to Puente Viejo to reprise the role of María Castañeda in 2016. She returned again to the series in 2018, leaving the series in 2019.

Mauleón's breakthrough role as Arantxa in Patria (2020) earned her critical acclaim and won her a Feroz Award for Best Supporting Actress. After an appearance in the miniseries Blowing Kisses, she joined the main cast of Express, which began filming in March 2021.

== Filmography ==
=== Film ===
Year	Title	Role	Notes	Ref.
2009	La máquina de pintar nubes		Feature film debut	
2022	Los renglones torcidos de Dios (God's Crooked Lines)	Montserrat Castell		
2022	Gelditasuna ekaitzean (Stillness in the Storm)	Lara		
2025	La buena letra (The Good Manners)	Ana		
2025	8			
2026	El fantasma de mi mujer (My Wife Is a Ghost)	María		

=== Television ===
Year	Title	Role	Notes	Ref.
2008–2012	Goenkale	Joana		
2012–2015; 2016; 2018–2019	El secreto de Puente Viejo	María Castañeda	Introduced in Season 2	
2015–2016	Aitaren Etxea	Irene Egaña	Main	
2016	Lo que escondían sus ojos	Ramona "Zita" Polo	TV miniseries	
2020	Patria	Arantxa Garmendia	TV miniseries	
2021	Besos al aire (Blowing Kisses)	Elena	TV miniseries	
2022	Express	Dulce	Main	
2023	La chica de la nieve (The Snow Girl)	Ana Núñez		
2024	Querer	Paula		

== Accolades ==
Year	Award	Category	Work	Result	Ref.
2021	8th Feroz Awards	Best Supporting TV Actress	Patria	Won	
2021	8th Platino Awards	Best Supporting TV Actress	Patria	Won	
2025	12th Feroz Awards	Best Supporting Actress in a Series	Querer	Pending	
2025	33rd Actors and Actresses Union Awards	Best Television Actress in a Secondary Role	Querer	Nominated	
