= Celia Rico Clavellino =

Spanish writer and film director

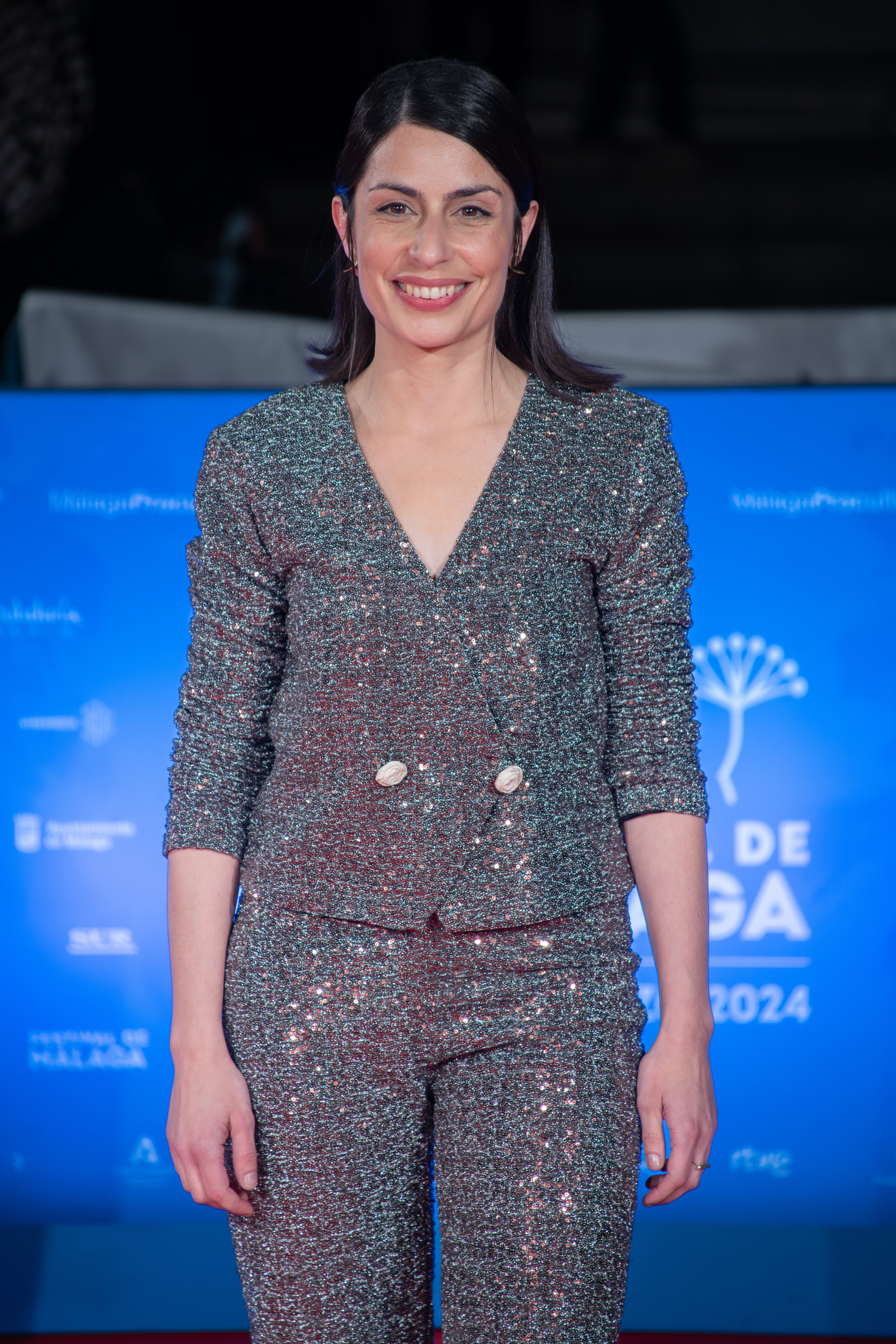
- Rico in 2024
- Born: 1982 (age 43–44); Constantina, Andalusia, Spain
- Occupations: Writer, film director

Celia Rico Clavellino (born 1982) is a Spanish writer and film director.

Rico holds a degree in audiovisual communications from the University of Seville and in literary theory and comparative literature from the University of Barcelona, as well as a DAS degree in film studies. For more than 10 years, she worked at Arcadia Motion Pictures and Oberon Cinematográfica. For the Joan Miró Foundation, she co-directed the TV series Mironins.

In 2012, she played Canguro in Childish Games. In the same year she released her directorial debut, the short Luisa no está en casa, which was screened at festivals all over the world and won the Gaudí Award for Best Short Film.

In 2014, she worked as an assistant director on Claudia Llosa's Aloft.

In 2018, her feature debut Journey to a Mother's Room became a big success. It won the Youth Jury Award at San Sebastian Film Festival, won Best Actress, Best Script, Best Supporting Actress and the Audience Award at the 2019 Gaudí Awards, was nominated four times at the Goya Awards, and won the Best Supporting Actress Award for Anna Castillo at the 6th Feroz Awards.

Rico's sophomore feature, Los pequeños amores (Little Loves), premiered at the 2024 Málaga Film Festival and received the Special Jury Prize as well as Best Supporting Actress for Adriana Ozores.

Rico teaches directing and scriptwriting at ESCAC and ECIB in Barcelona.

In June 2024, Rico was shooting her third feature film, La buena letra, an adaptation of the novel by Rafael Chirbes.

== Filmography ==
- Luisa no está en casa (short, 2012)
- Journey to a Mother's Room (2018)
- Los pequeños amores (2024)
- La buena letra (2025)
