= Javier Rey =

Spanish actor

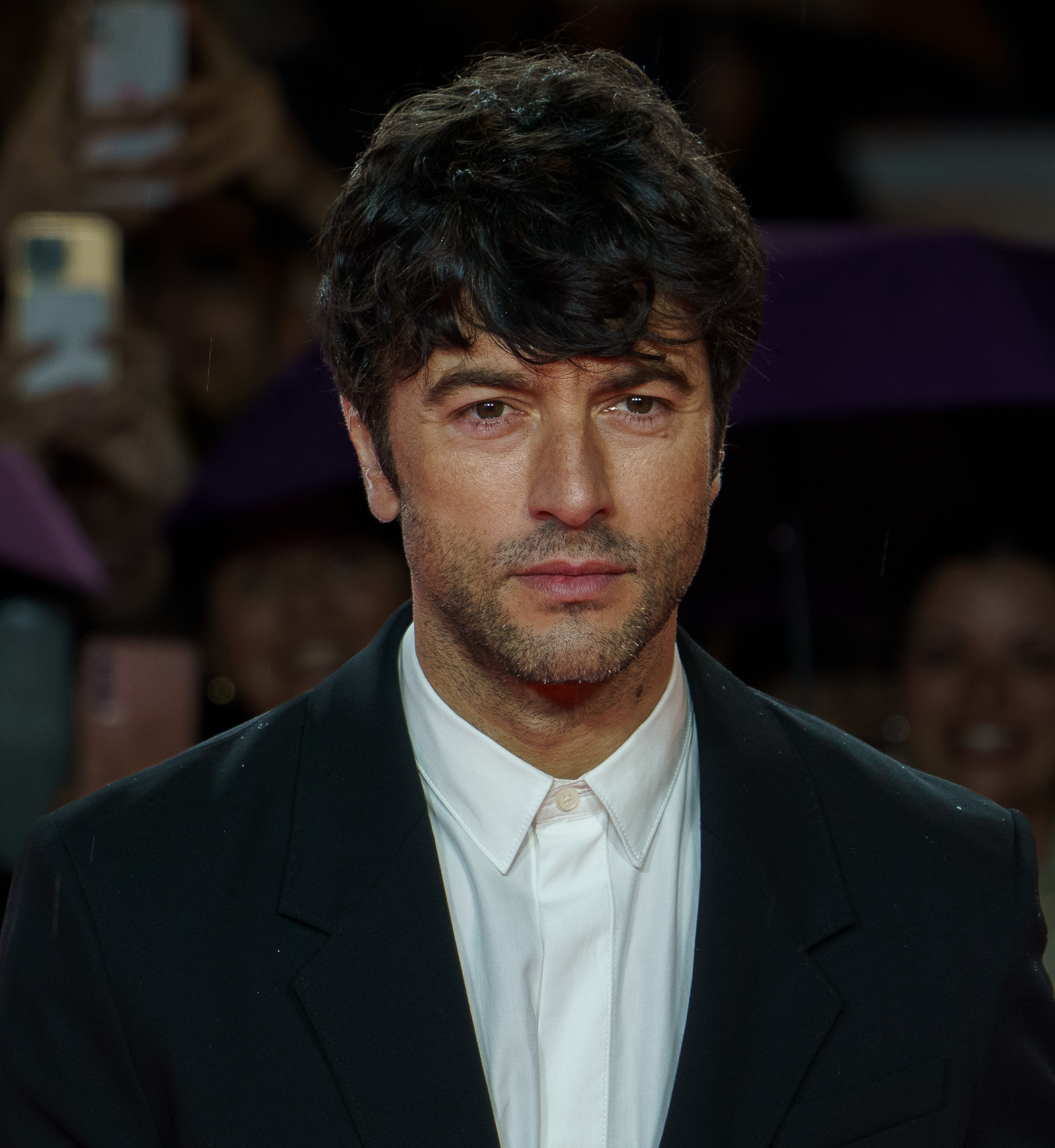
- Rey in 2025
- Born: 25 February 1980 (age 46); Noia, Galicia, Spain
- Occupation: Actor

Javier Rey (born 25 February 1980) is a Spanish actor. He is popular for his performance in the television series Cocaine Coast.

== Biography ==
Born in Noia, Galicia on 25 February 1980. He was an avid comic book collector before starting his acting career. He landed a notable role in 2001 with a stage performance in the theatrical play Ubú rey. He had his television debut in the 2005 series Al filo de la ley, performing Darío, a flirt of the Nadia de Santiago's character. He had his debut in a feature film in 2008 with his performance in 8 Dates. Often cast in supporting roles, he became a sought actor in lead roles in Spanish drama fiction after his performance in Velvet and particularly after his breakthrough role as Sito Miñanco in the 2018 series Cocaine Coast.

== Filmography ==
=== Television ===
Year	Title	Role	Notes	Ref.
2005	Al filo de la ley	Darío	Guest role. TV debut	
2007	Valderrei	Rafa	86 episodes	
2007	Amar en tiempos revueltos	Sancho	Recurring. 3 episodes.	
2009	Marisol, la película	Carlos Goyanes	TV movie aired as 2-episode miniseries	
2009	La chica de ayer	Cristóbal Mateo	Main cast	
2010–12	Hispania, la leyenda	Alejo de Urso	Main cast	
2011	Operación Malaya	Miguel Ángel Torres		
2012–13	Bandolera	Raúl Delgado	Main cast	
2012–14	Isabel	Diego Pacheco		
2013–16	Velvet	Mateo Ruiz		
2016	Lo que escondían sus ojos	Cristóbal Balenciaga	TV Miniseries	
2017	El final del camino	Pedro de Catoira		
2017–19	Velvet Colección	Mateo Ruiz		
2019	Fariña (Cocaine Coast)	Sito Miñanco	Starring role	
2020–21	Hache	Malpica	Starring role	
2020	Mentiras (Lies and Deceit)	Xavier Vera	Starring role	
2023	Los pacientes del doctor García (The Patients of Dr. García)	Doctor Guillermo García Medina		
2024	La última noche en Tremor (The Last Night at Tremore Beach)	Álex		

=== Film ===
Year	Title	Role	Notes	Ref.
2008	8 citas (8 Dates)	Pablo	Feature film debut	
2016	Kiki, el amor se hace (Kiki, Love to Love)	Javier		
2018	¿Qué te juegas?	Roberto Allende-Salazar		
2018	Sin fin (Not the End)	Javier		
2019	El silencio de la ciudad blanca (Twin Murders: The Silence of the White City)	Inspector Unai López de Ayala, "Kraken"		
2020	Orígenes secretos (Unknown Origins)	David Valentín		
2020	El verano que vivimos (The Summer We Lived)	Gonzalo		
2021	La casa del caracol (The House of Snails)	Antonio Prieto		
2022	Historias para no contar (Stories Not to Be Told)	Raul		
2024	La mujer dormida (The Sleeping Woman)	Agustín		
2025	8	Octavio		
2026	El fantasma de mi mujer (My Wife Is a Ghost)	Fernando		

== Awards and nominations ==
Year	Award	Category	Work	Result	Ref(s)
2018	20th Iris Awards	Best Actor	Fariña	Won	
2019	6th Feroz Awards	Best Actor in a TV Series	Fariña	Won	
2019	6th Feroz Awards	Best Actor in a Film	Not the End	Nominated	
2019	69th Fotogramas de Plata	Best TV Actor	Fariña	Won	
2019	6th Platino Awards	Best Actor in a Miniseries or TV series	Fariña	Nominated	
2021	8th MiM Series Awards	Best Drama Actor	Hache	Won	
