= Mimi Morales =

Colombian actress

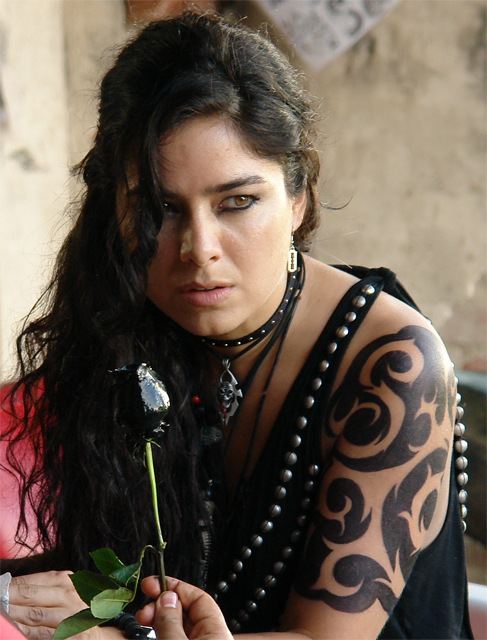
- Born: María Elvira Morales; April 11, 1976 (age 50); Cartagena de Indias, Colombia
- Occupation: Actress
- Years active: 2005 - present

Mimi Morales (born April 11, 1976 in Cartagena, Colombia) is a Colombian actress.

During her childhood she became interested in Martial Arts, and she has practiced ballet since she was four years old.

She first starred in a TV ad for a Colombian soda. Later, she was spotted by a Novela producer who offered Mimi a role in Amor a mil.

She studied Social Communication at the Politécnico Gran Colombiano in Bogotá.

== Filmography ==
=== Film ===
Year	Title	Role	Notes
2011	Lecciones para un beso	Lena	Film debut

=== Television ===
Year	Title	Role	Notes
2007-2008	La marca del deseo	María Soledad	Co-Lead role
2008-2009	Doña Bárbara	Altagracia Linares	Recurring role
2010	Bella calamidades	Esperanza Capurro	Recurring role
2010-2011	Triunfo del amor	Lucy	Recurring role
2013	Fortuna	Carolina Gil Ledesma	Recurring role
2014	La impostora	Karina	Co-lead role
2014-2015	Muchacha italiana viene a casarse	Sonia Ángeles	Recurring role
2016-2017	El Capo	Valeria Buenrostro	Recurring role
2017	Paquita la del Barrio	Carmina	Recurring role
2017-2018	Muy padres	Gina Paola	Recurring role
2019	Por amar sin ley	Violeta Camacho	Guest role (season 2)
2020-2021	Quererlo todo	Magdalena Bustamante	Recurring role
2022	Los ricos también lloran	Guadalupe Morales	Recurring role
2023	El Señor de los Cielos	Said Rivero	Recurring role (season 8)
2023	Tierra de esperanza	Camila Díaz	Recurring role
2025	Me atrevo a amarte	Candela	
2025	Mujeres asesinas	Dr. Chavela	Episode: "Pilar"
2026	Tan cerca de ti, nace el amor	Isaura	
