= Si vis pacem, para bellum =

Latin adage translated as, "If you want peace, prepare for war"

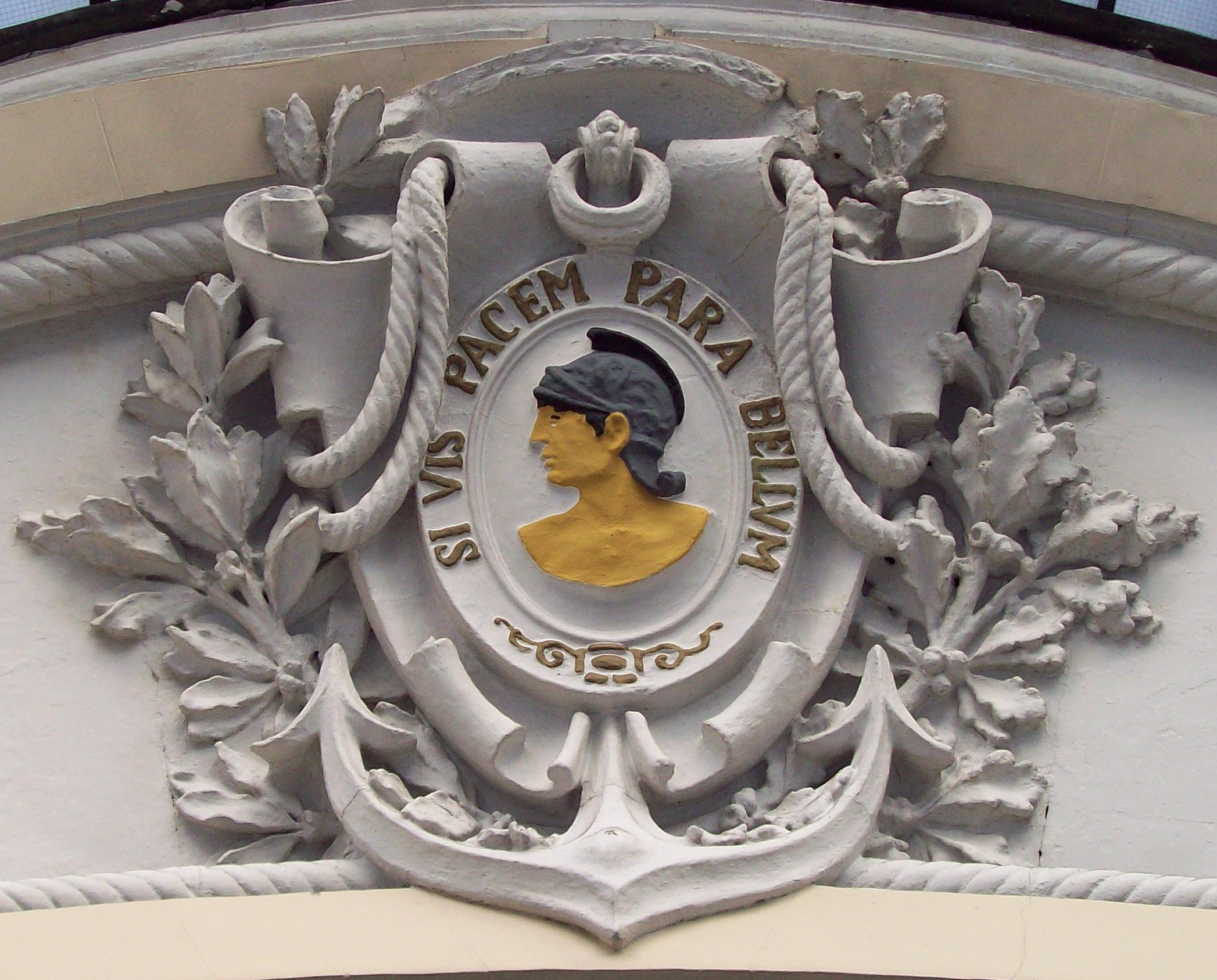
Relief at the entrance of the Cultural Center of the Armies in Madrid, showing the Latin phrase "Si vis pacem, para bellum."

Si vis pacem, para bellum (Classical Latin: [siː wiːs ˈpaːkɛ̃ ˈparaː ˈbɛllʊ̃]) is a Latin adage translated as "If you want peace, prepare for war." The phrase is adapted from a statement found in Roman author Publius Flavius Vegetius Renatus's tract De Re Militari (fourth or fifth century AD), in which the actual phrasing is Igitur qui desiderat pacem, præparet bellum ("Therefore let him who desires peace prepare for war"). The idea which it conveys also appears in earlier works such as Plato's Nomoi (Laws). The phrase presents the insight that the conditions of peace are often preserved by a readiness to make war to defend said peace when the need arises.

== Derived uses ==
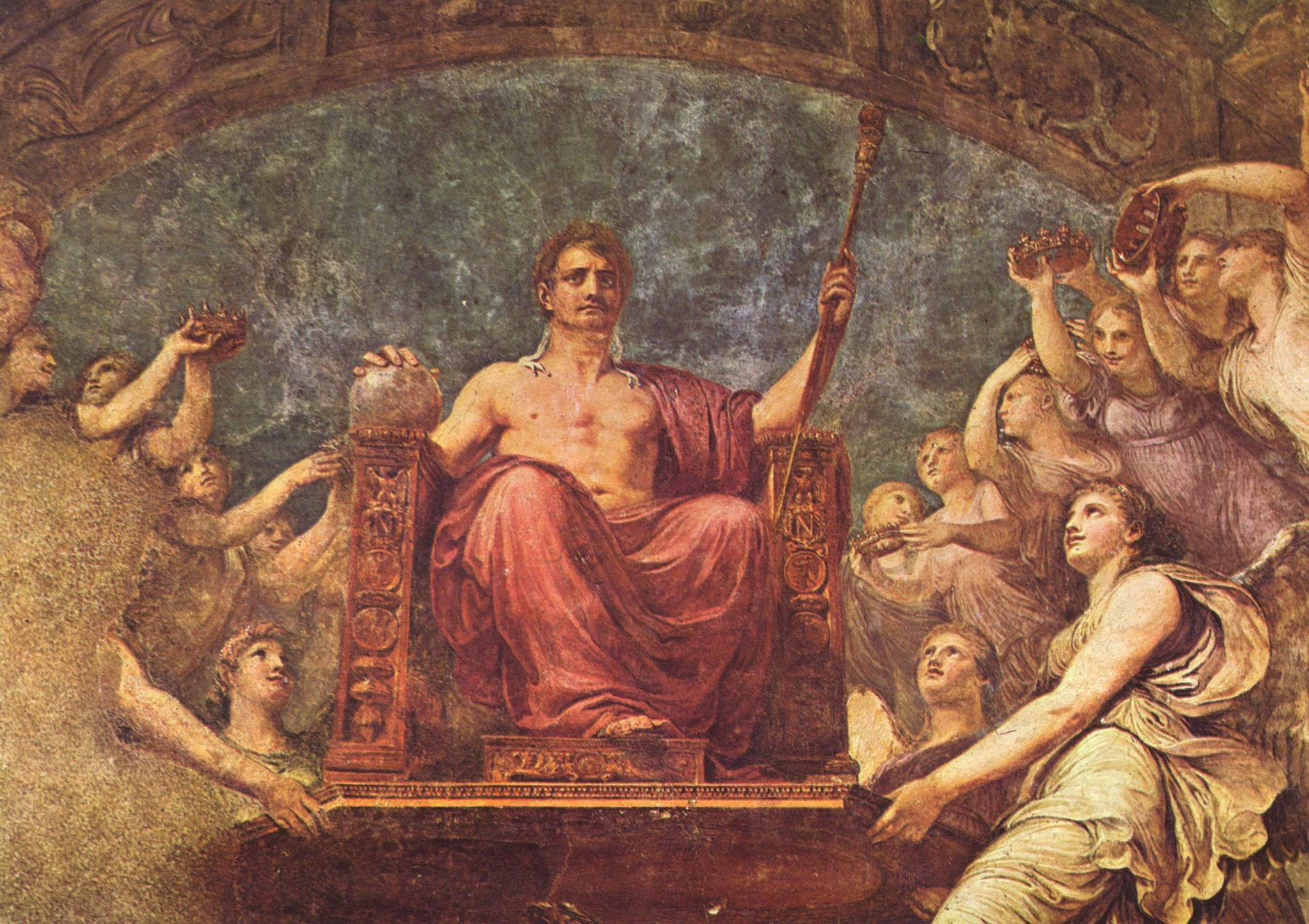
Apotheosis of Napoleon, Andrea Appiani, 1807.

Whatever the source, the adage has become a living vocabulary item itself, used in the production of different ideas in a number of languages. For example, in 1790 during his first annual address to a joint session of Congress, George Washington stated "To be prepared for war is one of the most effectual means of preserving peace."

=== Si vis bellum para pacem ===
For example, historian Louis Antoine Fauvelet de Bourrienne made reference to the foreign policy of Napoleon Bonaparte:

Everyone knows the adage... Had Bonaparte been a Latin scholar he would probably have reversed it and said, Si vis bellum para pacem.

=== Si vis pacem para pactum ===
In the United States, the National Arbitration and Peace Congress of 1907, presided over by Andrew Carnegie said:

These vast armaments on land and water are being defended as a means, not to wage war, but to prevent war... there is a safer way ... it requires only the consent and the good-will of the governments. Today they say ... If you want peace, prepare for war. This Congress says in behalf of the people: Si vis pacem, para pactum, if you want peace, agree to keep the peace.

=== Si vis pacem fac bellum ===
"If you want peace, make war." The solution does not cover the case of the nation that does not desire peace. Imperial Germany went to war in 1914 and was castigated by Richard Grelling, a German-Jewish pacifist, in J'Accuse (1915). In 1918 Grelling wrote again, this time as an expatriate in Switzerland. Citing Woodrow Wilson's "The world must be safe for democracy" speech before Congress on April 2, 1917, Grelling says:

When all other means fail, ... the liberation of the world from military domination can in the extreme case only take place by battle. ... in place of si vis pacem para bellum a similarly sounding principle ... may become a necessity: Si vis pacem, fac bellum.

=== Si vis pacem para pacem ===
"If you want peace, prepare for peace." The great wars of the 19th and 20th centuries were opposed by the philosophy of pacifism, which in the 19th century was associated with early socialism, even though the socialism of the 20th century often lacked pacifistic tendencies, preaching violent revolution instead. The pacifism that opposed the world wars traced its lineage to Barthélemy Prosper Enfantin, an early French socialist and one of the founders of Saint-Simonianism. As early as April 2, 1841, he had said in a letter to General Saint-Cyr Nugues:

Le fameux dicton ... me semble beaucoup moins vrai, pour le XIX^{e} siècle, que Si vis pacem, para pacem.
The famous dictum ... seems to me much less true, for the 19th century, than Si vis pacem, para pacem.

with reference to Algeria. By way of elucidation Enfantin goes on to say that war could have been avoided if proper study of Algeria had been made.

=== The parabellum ===
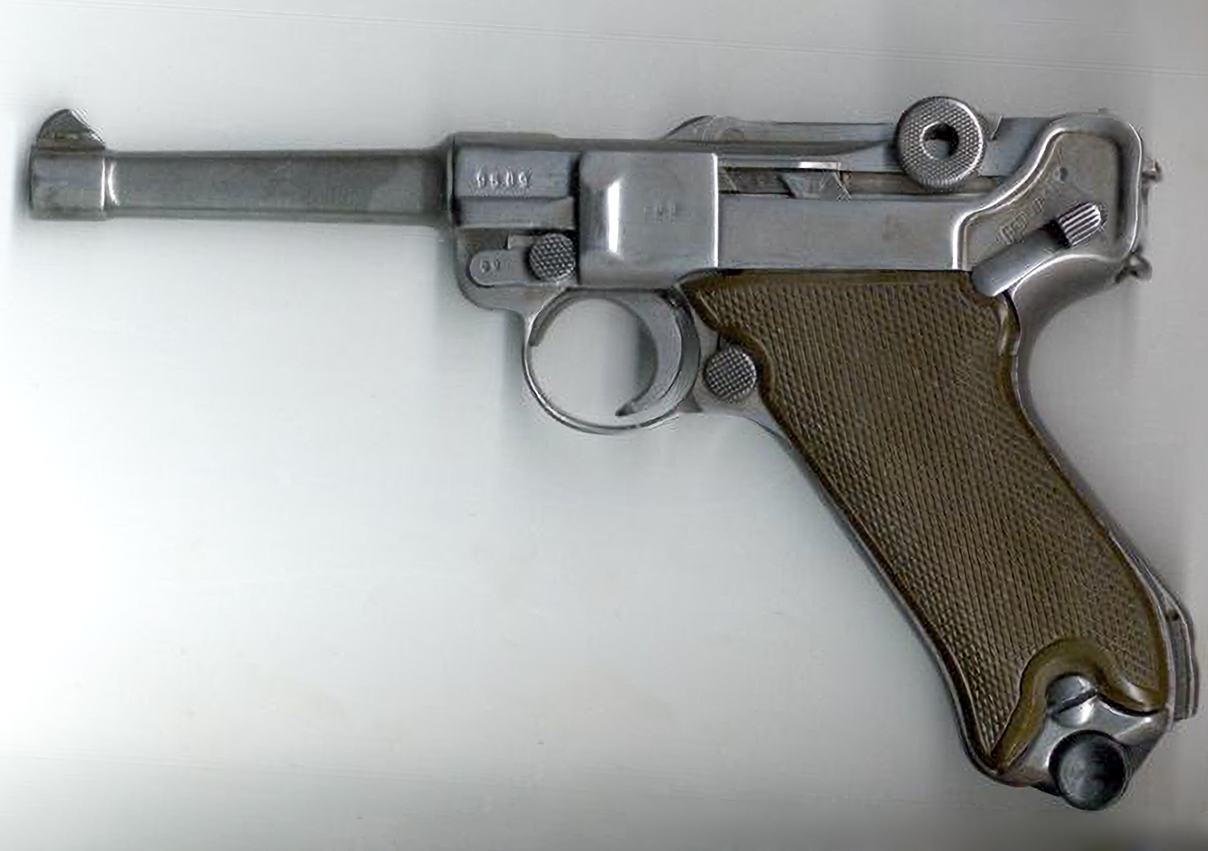
Luger model P08 (1908) chambered in 9mm Parabellum

The main clause of the adage was used as a motto by German arms maker Deutsche Waffen und Munitionsfabriken (DWM), and is the source of the term Parabellum as applied to firearms and ammunition (especially the 7.65mm Parabellum and the 9mm Parabellum cartridges). "Parabellum" was the telegraphic address of DWM.

== See also ==
- Jus ad bellum
- Paradox of tolerance
- Peace through strength
- Security dilemma
