= 8 (2025 film) =

- Theatrical release poster
- Directed by: Julio Medem
- Written by: Julio Medem
- Produced by: Álvaro Longoria; Rodrigo Espinel; Julio Medem
- Starring: Ana Rujas; Javier Rey; Tamar Novas; Loreto Mauleón; Carla Díaz; María Isasi; Mateo Medina; Oriol Riera; Asier Burguete; Patxi Barco; Kandido Uranga; Javier Morgade; Andoni Agirregomezkorta; Álvaro Morte
- Cinematography: Rafa Reparaz
- Edited by: Julio Medem
- Music by: Lucas Vidal
- Production companies: Barbazul la película AIE; Eidan Produce; Morena Films; Quexito Films
- Distributed by: Vercine
- Release dates: 16 March 2025 (Málaga); 21 March 2025 (Spain)
- Country: Spain
- Language: Spanish

8 is a 2025 Spanish historical drama film written, directed, produced and edited by Julio Medem and starring Javier Rey and Ana Rujas.

== Plot ==
Set over a 90-year period against the backdrop of the vicissitudes of 20th-century Spanish history, the plot explores the romantic relationship between Octavio and Adela, both born on 14 April 1931, in eight sequence shots.

== Cast ==
- Javier Rey as Octavio
- Ana Rujas as Adela
- Álvaro Morte
- Tamar Novas
- María Isasi
- Loreto Mauleón
- Carla Díaz
- Mateo Medina
- Irene Aragón
- Jordi Catalán

== Production ==
The film is a Barbazul la película AIE, Eidan Produce, and Morena Films production alongside Quexito Films, with the participation of RTVE and Movistar Plus+. Shooting locations included Artzineaga, Orduña, and Bilbao. Latido Films is the film's international sales agent.

== Release ==
8 was presented on 16 March 2025 in a non-competitive slot of the 28th Málaga Film Festival's official selection. Distributed by Vercine, the film is scheduled to be released theatrically in Spain on 21 March 2025.

== Reception ==
Víctor A. Gómez of La Opinión de Málaga declared the film "a shameless journey between delirium and nonsense, which fails hopelessly in all its objectives".

Alfonso Rivera of Cineuropa considered that, in the film, Medem demonstrates again his ability to combine "the most sublime, melancholic and sensitive with the most ridiculous, pedantic and embarrassing".

Javier Ocaña of El País determined the film to be a "fiasco", lamenting that while "the form still has its visual power" [the heart of the film] "is a political catechism for children".

Juan Pando of Fotogramas rated the film 3 out of 5 stars, warning that Medem's universe, "so personal, [it] demands a complicity that is not shared by all viewers", and the film is not an exception.

== Accolades ==
| Year | Award | Category | Nominee(s) | Result | Ref. |
|---|---|---|---|---|---|
| 2025 | 28th Málaga Film Festival | Silver Biznaga, Audience Award for Best Film (Out of Competition) | | Won | |

== See also ==
- List of Spanish films of 2025
