= Express (TV series) =

Spanish television series

- Genre: Action thriller; Family drama
- Created by: Iván Escobar
- Screenplay by: Iván Escobar; Antonio Sánchez Olivas; Martín Suárez
- Directed by: Gabe Ibáñez; Iñaki Peñafiel
- Starring: Maggie Civantos; Esteban Meloni; Kiti Mánver; Vicente Romero; Loreto Mauleón; Ana Marzoa; Alba Planas; Bernardo Flores
- Country of origin: Spain
- Original language: Spanish
- No. of seasons: 2
- No. of episodes: 16

Production
- Production companies: The Mediapro Studio; Starzplay; Pantaya

Original release
- Release: 16 January 2022 – present

Express is a Spanish thriller television series created by Iván Escobar and directed by Gabe Ibáñez and Iñaki Peñafiel. Starring Maggie Civantos as lead character, the plot concerns the so-called express kidnappings. It is the first Starzplay original series produced in Spain. It was released on 16 January 2022.

== Premise ==
Consisting of a dramatization of a so-called express kidnapping, the story follows Bárbara, a criminal psychologist who falls victim to one of such short-lived abductions.

== Cast ==
- Maggie Civantos as Bárbara
- Esteban Meloni
- Kiti Mánver as Ortega
- Vicente Romero
- Loreto Mauleón
- Ana Marzoa
- Alba Planas
- Bernardo Flores
- Omar Banana
- Carmen Daza
- Manuela Rojas

== Production ==
Created by Iván Escobar and written by Escobar together with Antonio Sánchez Olivas and Martín Suárez, the series was produced by The Mediapro Studio, Starzplay (distributor in Spain and Latin-America) and Pantaya (distributor in the United States and Puerto Rico). Elsewhere, the Mediapro Studio Distribution will serve as distributor. It is thus the first Starzplay original series produced in Spain. Filming began by mid March 2021 and wrapped by early June 2021. Directed by Gabe Ibáñez and Iñaki Peñafiel, Express was primarily shot in a film set in Madrid. Shooting locations also included the Casa Huarte in the Puerta de Hierro area of Madrid. Consisting of 8 episodes, it is set for a 16 January 2022 release.
