= Crematorio =

- Created by: Jorge Sánchez-Cabezudo
- Based on: Crematorio by Rafael Chirbes
- Written by: Jorge Sánchez-Cabezudo; Alberto Sánchez-Cabezudo; Laura Sarmiento Pallarés
- Starring: José Sancho; Alicia Borrachero; Juana Acosta; Aura Garrido; Montserrat Carulla; Pau Durà; Vicente Romero
- Country of origin: Spain
- No. of episodes: 8

Production
- Running time: 48 min
- Production company: MOD Producciones

Original release
- Network: Canal +
- Release: March 7 – April 25, 2011

Crematorio (transl. 'Crematorium') is a Spanish TV series written and directed by Jorge Sánchez-Cabezudo. It is based on Rafael Chirbes's novel of the same name. It was produced by MOD Producciones for Canal+.

== Plot summary ==
Crematorio is the story of the Bertomeus, a family that has managed to amass a great fortune over several generations. Rubén Bertomeu left agricultural businesses behind to create a business network that has made him the richest and most powerful man in Misent. Only in the family environment Rubén Bertomeu finds opposition to his way of understanding progress.

== Cast and characters ==
=== Main cast ===
- José Sancho is Rubén Bertomeu, a wealthy real estate developer heading a huge project called Costa Azul, which includes miles of coastline. He has made a fortune in recent years, but at the limits of what is considered legal.
- Alicia Borrachero is Silvia Bertomeu, Rubén's daughter, who runs a gallery and lives separate from the darker side of her father's business.
- Juana Acosta is Mónica, Rubén's 29-year-old lover, who uses her looks to get what she wants.
- Aura Garrido is Miriam, Silvia's 18-year-old daughter who studies at a prestigious London university, paid for by her grandfather Rubén.
- Montserrat Carulla is Teresa, Rubén's mother, who had a closer relationship with Matias, Ruben's recently diseased brother.
- Pau Durà is Zarrategui, the Bertomeu's family lawyer, who has spies in the police force and in other organisations so that the company manages to stay one step ahead.
- Vicente Romero is Sarcós, the man who does Ruben's dirty work.
- Pep Tosar is Collado, Ruben's former right-hand man, who now works for himself in a small business and begins to have problems with his former boss.
- Vlad Ivanov is Traian, a Russian who has made money with Ruben's previous projects and is determined that Ruben's family have no negative effect on future undertakings.

== Reception ==
=== Critical response ===
The series is rated as one of the best in the history of Spanish television. Manuel Cuesta of El Almería especially praised the performance of Pepe Sancho, claiming it gave the show credibility and glamour, and described it as the actor's best work.

Variety described Crematorio as a "withering social portrait of modern Spain" and suggested that the series represented part of "a talent influx from cinema into TV production" in Spain.

The show was acquired by Netflix in August 2017.

== Episodes ==
No.	Title	Directed by	Written by	Premiere on Canal + (above) on La Sexta (below)	Audience
1	"Toda la paz del mediterráneo"	Jorge Sánchez-Cabezudo	Jorge Sánchez Cabezudo; Alberto Sánchez Cabezudo	7 March 2011; 30 January 2012	1,628,000 viewers 7.8% of share
Rubén Bertomeu and Traian have a tense conversation about participating in the new, ambitious project to build an urban complex.
2	"El barranco"	Jorge Sánchez-Cabezudo	Jorge Sánchez Cabezudo; Alberto Sánchez Cabezudo	14 March 2011; 31 January 2012	1,327,000 viewers 8.3% of share
Collado abandons his family and tries to run away with Traian’s favorite prostitute, but when he gets assaulted, he thinks that Bertomeu betrayed him.
3	"Cambio de pareja"	Jorge Sánchez-Cabezudo	Jorge Sánchez Cabezudo; Agustín Martínez	21 March 2011; 6 January 2012	1,043,000 viewers 5.1% of share
Bertomeu’s priority is to submit his ambitious real estate proposal, but problems with the front men and Traian throw a wrench in his plans.
4	"La oveja negra"	Jorge Sánchez-Cabezudo	Jorge Sánchez Cabezudo; Alberto Sánchez Cabezudo	28 March 2011; 6 February 2012	869,000 viewers 5.6% of share
Bertomeu suspects that Traian is behind the robbery at his house and does everything possible to recover the contents of the safe.
5	"Día de pesca"	Jorge Sánchez-Cabezudo	Jorge Sánchez Cabezudo; Alberto Sánchez Cabezudo	4 April 2011; 13 February 2012	992,000 viewers 4.8% of share
Rubén and Llorens are in jail while Zarrategui, Bertomeu’s discreet lawyer, tries to put things in order after speaking to an informant.
6	"Manhattan"	Jorge Sánchez-Cabezudo	Jorge Sánchez Cabezudo; Alberto Sánchez Cabezudo	11 April 2011; 13 February 2012	815,000 viewers 5.0% of share
Mónica tries to help get Rubén released but she complicates things even more. Silvia goes to see her father get out of prison but is nervous about it.
7	"El General"	Jorge Sánchez-Cabezudo	Jorge Sánchez Cabezudo; Alberto Sánchez Cabezudo	18 April 2011; 20 February 2012	902,000 viewers 4.5% of share
Silvia becomes desperate for money after her family’s accounts are frozen, however, no one wants to be involved in Bertomeu’s affairs.
8	"No dejamos nada"	Jorge Sánchez-Cabezudo	Jorge Sánchez Cabezudo; Alberto Sánchez Cabezudo	25 April 2011; 20 February 2012	711,000 viewers 4.6% of share
The fence closes in around Rubén Bertomeu. Miriam is kidnapped. Mónica will appear in court. Zarrategui disappears with compromising documents.

== Awards and nominations ==
Year	Award	Category	Nominees	Result	Ref.
2011	58th Ondas Awards	Best Spanish TV series		Won	
2012	14th Iris Awards	Best Actress	Alicia Borrachero	Nominated	
