= De tú a tú =

Spanish television program

- Genre: Magazine, container program
- Presented by: Nieves Herrero
- Country of origin: Spain
- Original language: Spanish
- No. of seasons: 3
- No. of episodes: 100

Production
- Running time: 90 minutes

Original release
- Network: Antena 3
- Release: 25 June 1990 – 8 May 1993

De tú a tú (From You to You) is a Spanish television program broadcast by Antena 3 from 1990 to 1993. It was presented by the journalist Nieves Herrero.

== Format ==
The show, originally co-presented by Jesús Cisneros, began its broadcasts in the form of a morning magazine, aired Monday through Friday from 9:30 a.m. to 2:00 p.m. It included, like other shows broadcast in the same time slot, interviews, debates, musical performances, news, contests, and health tips by Bartolomé Beltrán. It also featured television series such as La intrusa, General Hospital, and Peyton Place.

Beginning on 26 February 1991, the show had a night edition, broadcast on Tuesdays, and premiered with an interview of Camilo José Cela. A month later, the daily morning edition was canceled.

In the 1992–1993 season, the program was made over with the collaboration of Jaime de Mora y Aragón, Chumy Chúmez, and Alfonso Ussía in a mini tertulia, as well as Ángel Garó's humor.

== Alcàsser Girls case ==
On 28 January 1993, De tú a tú was broadcast live from the Valencian town of Alcàsser, after the bodies of the girls Miriam García, Antonia Gómez, and Desirée Hernández, were found there. The presenter interviewed the grieving parents of García and Gómez, reaching a ratings share of 16% (twice its usual score).

The broadcast ignited controversy, eliciting numerous opinion articles in newspapers and magazines, letters to the editor, and even books, and opened a debate on the limits of journalistic ethics. The event marked a turning point in Herrero's career; in an interview she admitted that she came to consider leaving the journalistic profession in the face of the wave of criticism, and years later she still recognized that it was the worst moment of her professional life.
