= Nieves Herrero =

Spanish journalist, television presenter, and writer

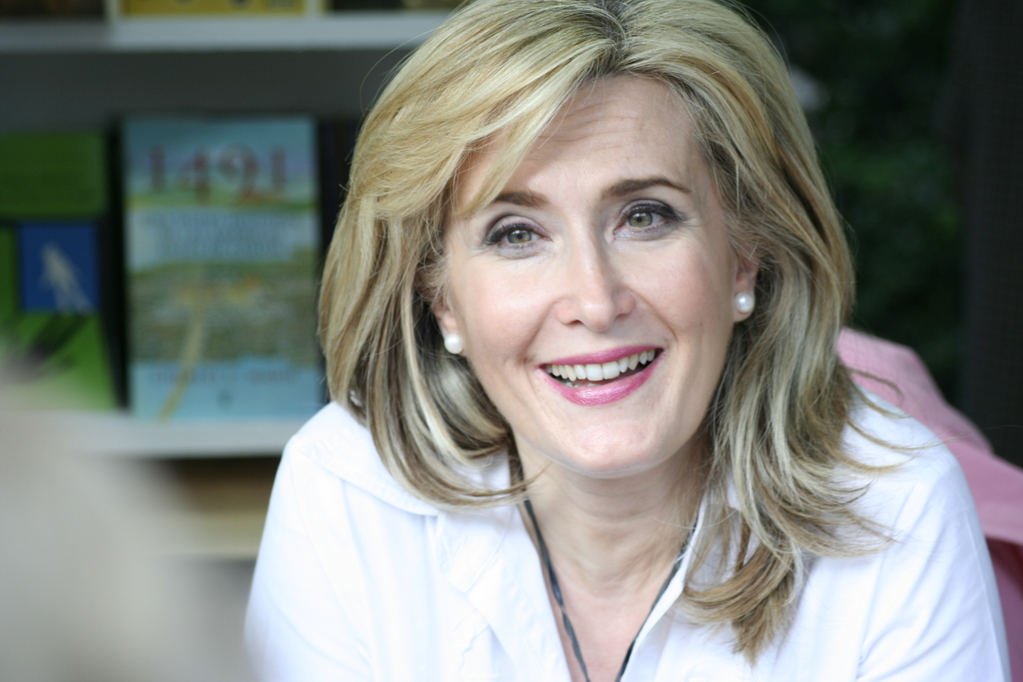
- At the 2006 Madrid Book Fair
- Born: Nieves Herrero Cerezo; 23 March 1957 (age 69); Madrid, Spain
- Education: European University of Madrid
- Occupations: Journalist; presenter; writer
- Employer: Onda Madrid
- Spouse: Ángel Moreno
- Awards: TP de Oro (1989, 1990, 1991); Antena de Oro (1999); Ondas Award (1999)

Nieves Herrero Cerezo (born 23 March 1957) is a Spanish journalist, television presenter, and writer.

== Career ==
=== Beginnings: TVE ===
Born in Madrid, Nieves Herrero graduated in Journalism from the Complutense University of Madrid in 1980, and in Law from the European University of Madrid in 2010. After her beginnings in the press, she went to Antena 3 Radio and arrived at Televisión Española (TVE) as editor of the morning program Por la mañana (1987–1989) hosted by Jesús Hermida, and of which she became deputy director. The show earned her the nickname "Chica Hermida", which she shared with other media professionals in the following years, such as Consuelo Berlanga and Irma Soriano.

She continued collaborating with Hermida on A mi manera, a similar program that was broadcast in the afternoons, where she remained from 1989 to 1990.

=== Antena 3 ===
With the arrival of private television, Herrero was hired by Antena 3 and, starting in September 1990, she began to present and direct her own daily magazine, De tú a tú, which was on the air until 1993. The program's coverage of the Alcasser Girls murders was very much commented on, making a live broadcast from that town the same night that the bodies of the girls were found. The parents were asked questions about their feelings in those moments, turning their grief into a public spectacle relayed throughout Spain. Later, between 1993 and 1996, and on the same network, she hosted the talk show Cita con la vida.

=== TVE ===
In 1997 she returned to TVE, where she presented Hoy es posible, a program oriented towards causes of solidarity. The first episode was broadcast on 28 January.

=== RNE ===
After that experience, Herrero moved away from the world of cameras and focused on the radio where she hosted, from 1997 to 2004, the show Lo que es la vida on Radio Nacional de España (RNE). She currently writes for La noche en vela.

=== Regional television ===
In 2006 she returned to television, with the daily magazine Hoy por ti on Telemadrid until 2007. She next headed the interview show Un día con... on La 7 Televisión Región de Murcia until 2009. Since 2009 she has been a regular guest on the Aragón TV afternoon magazine Sin ir más lejos, which she continues to contribute to.

=== Telecinco ===
Herrero was a contributor to the Telecinco program La Noria during 2009/2010.

In 2014 she began a new stage of her career as a collaborator on interviews with politically important personalities on the program Abre los ojos y mira.

The 2016 television miniseries Lo que escondían sus ojos was based on Herrero's novel of the same name.

In March 2017 she began to contribute to Sábado Deluxe.

=== La 10 ===
For a few months in the 2010/2011 season, she put herself back at the head of the show Un día con..., for the Vocento channel La 10.

=== 13TV ===
She was hired by the Catholic network 13TV in 2011 as one of its main stars for the launch of the channel. In April 2011 she began to present the evening magazine Te damos la tarde, which was broadcast until June 2013.

In the face of the channel's new season, on 15 September 2013 she began hosting the program Hoy Nieves! This weekly show included news, social chronicles, interviews, and reports. It ended in August 2014.

Beginning in February 2015, she presented the program Detrás de la verdad every Friday, and from September 2016 to July 2017 she presented, from Monday to Friday, Hoy es noticia. In July 2017 she left the network.

=== Capital Radio ===
Hired in 2015 by the business station Capital Radio, Nieves Herrero directed and presented the weekend magazine Vivir, viajar. The show was also made available as a podcast, with new travelers in mind, after its broadcast every Saturday at 11 am.

=== Onda Madrid ===
Since 11 September 2017 she has presented Madrid directo, the evening program of the regional radio station Onda Madrid.

== Private life ==
Nieves Herrero is a professor at the European University of Madrid's Faculty of Communication and Humanities and the University Center Villanueva of Madrid, attached to the Complutense University. She is divorced and has two daughters.

== Other works ==
Herrero has written five books, four of them novels: Esa luna rota (2001), Todo fue nada, Leonor. Ha nacido una Reina (2006), Corazón indio (2010), Lo que escondían sus ojos (2013), and Como si no hubiera un mañana (2015), for which she won the Madrid Critics' Award.

She has been an editor of El Mundo Magazine, where she has an interview section called "A solas con ellas..."

She is the director of the project Madrid Digital Multimedia (MDM).

== Awards and nominations ==
Award	Year	Work	Category	Result	Ref.
Ondas Award	1991	De tú a tú	National Television	Winner	
Antena de Oro	1999	Lo que es la vida	Radio	Winner	
TP de Oro	1989	A mi manera	Presenter	Winner	
TP de Oro	1990	De tú a tú	Presenter	Winner	
TP de Oro	1991	De tú a tú	Presenter	Winner	
TP de Oro	1992	De tú a tú	Presenter	Nominated	
TP de Oro	1995	Cita con la vida	Presenter	Nominated	
Madrid Critics' Award	2015	Como si no hubiera un mañana		Winner	
