= Centro Cultural de los Ejércitos =

Building in Madrid

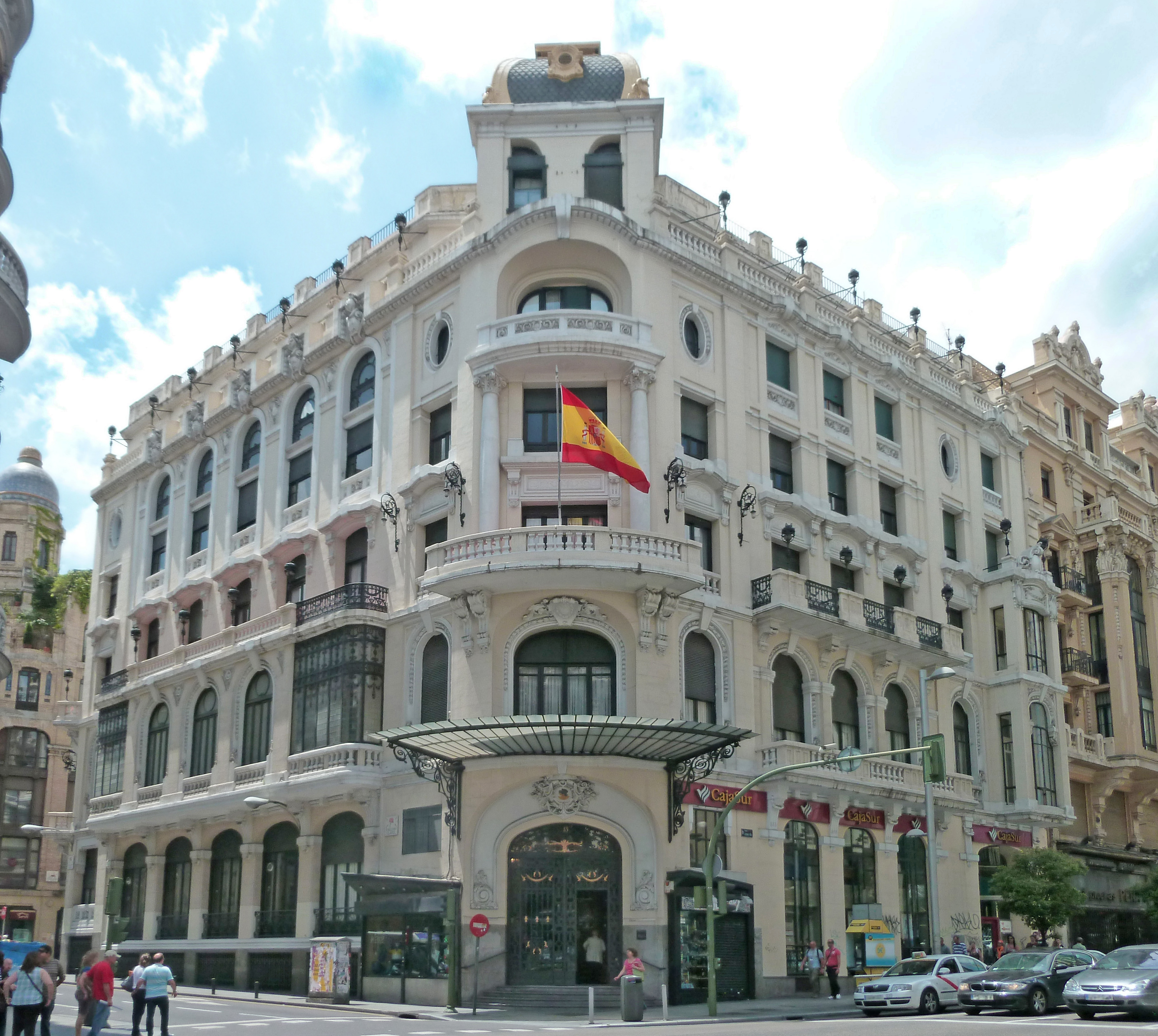
- Interactive map of the Centro Cultural de los Ejércitos area

General information
- Architectural style: Art Nouveau
- Location: Madrid, Spain
- Construction started: 1915
- Completed: 1916
- Inaugurated: 16 November 1916

Technical details
- Floor count: 5

Design and construction
- Architect: Eduardo Sánchez Eznarriaga

Website
- www.cculturalejercitos.com

The Centro Cultural de los Ejércitos (in English, Cultural Centre of the Armed Forces) is an educational military society currently located at Gran Vía 13 in Madrid. The building is also commonly known as the Casino Militar.

== History of the society ==
Beginning in the mid-nineteenth century, the need was felt for the creation of an institution to promote the study of military science. The then Centre of the Army and the Navy was founded in 1881 in a building at the one end of Calle de Fuencarral.

After changing its location several times, the centre bought a plot of land on the new Gran Vía, bordering Calle del Clavel and Calle del Caballero de Gracia. It soon become that the space was not enough. A smaller annex was added, bringing the total to 965 square meters.

When the Air Force was incorporated in 1940, the institution was renamed as the Cultural Centre of the Armed Forces.

As of 2021, the Cultural Centre of the Armed Forces continues to carry out cultural and educational work.

== The building ==
The building is located at Gran Vía 13, in the Sol neighborhood of the Centro district of the Spanish capital. It is near Calle del Clavel 1 and Calle del Caballero de Gracia 9.

The land on which the building was erected was acquired by the Casino Militar in 1912. It was inaugurated on 16 November 1916 by King Alfonso XIII.

The ground floor is crowned by depressed arches. The main floor fronts Gran Vía with an imposing balcony with semicircular arched doors and balustrades, while the side facing Calle del Clavel is finished off at both ends with stained glass windows made of glass and iron. The first floor has a balcony with a wrought-iron guard rail and access is through a segmental arch with decorated tympana that disappear on the side to adapt to the greater height of the dining room. The second floor has lintelled windows that are linked with those of the floor above by a perimeter fence topped by simple segmental arches that provide an undulating shape to the finishing cornice. The third floor on the side of Calle del Clavel enjoys a double height space to accommodate the library, and it is crowned by semicircular arches with large shields on the keystones, which transform the cornice into a crenellated meander.

The arched door at the entrance is protected by a large awning framed in wrought-iron, a balustrade balcony on top of the main floor flanked by two double-height columns with Corinthian capitals that support a second balcony on the third floor, and a finishing tower surmounted by a slate-clad vaulted roof. This vertical ensemble acts as an axis of composition where symmetry is deliberately renounced, but where each element finds in response another similar but not identical component on the other side of the rounded corner.

The facade facing Caballero de Gracia is simpler, although it respects the balance with its reciprocal facing Calle del Clavel, with which it is articulated by means of a chamfer that culminates in a large coat of arms of Spain.

Particularly noteworthy throughout the complex is the decorative importance given to the wrought iron lampposts scattered along the walls, balconies and terraces.

The construction obtained the first honorable mention at the City Council awards for the best-built properties in 1916, and the architect, Eduardo Sánchez Eznarriaga, received a cooperation diploma.

== Gallery ==
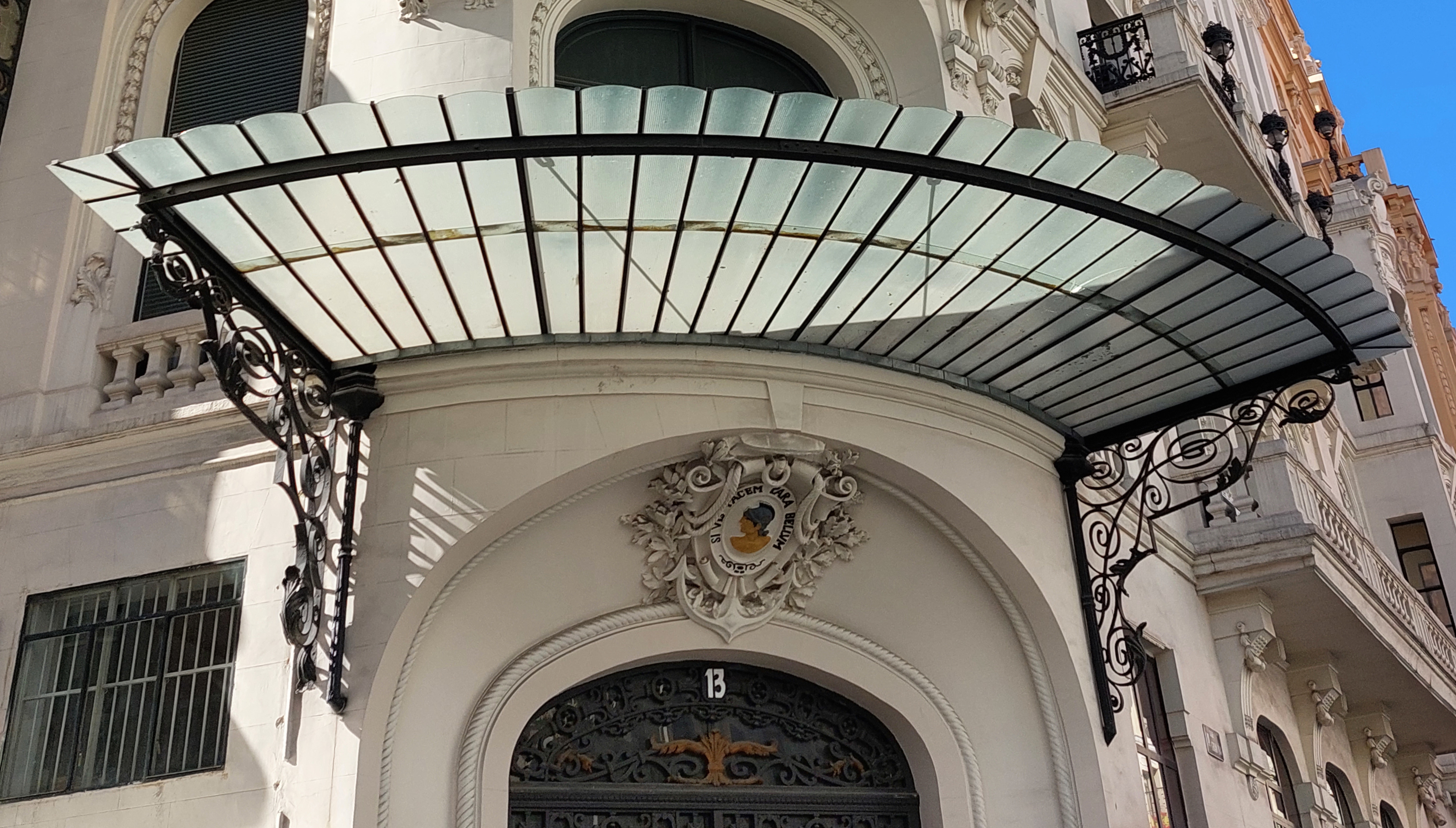
Awning at main entrance

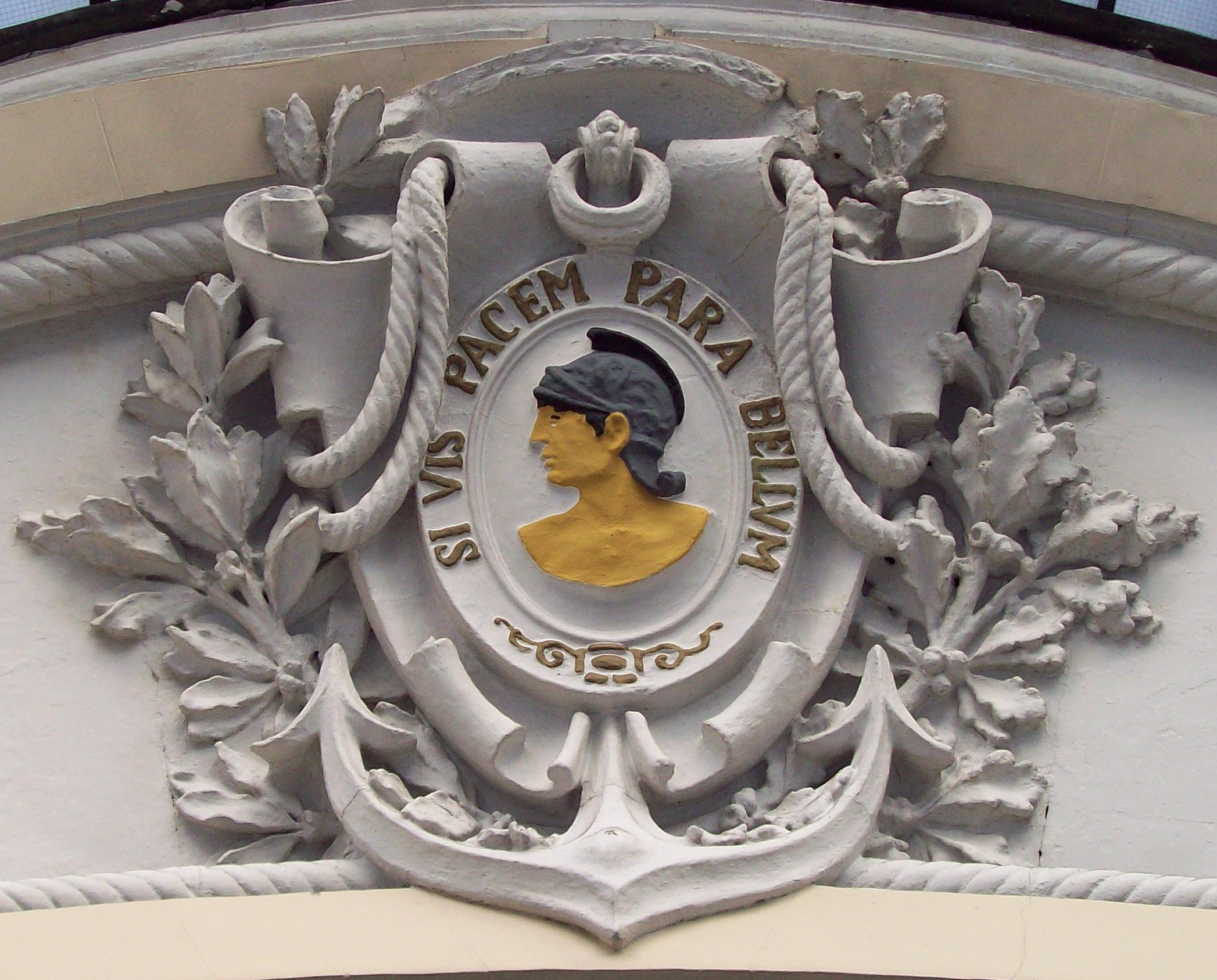
Inscription Si vis pacem, para bellum at main entrance

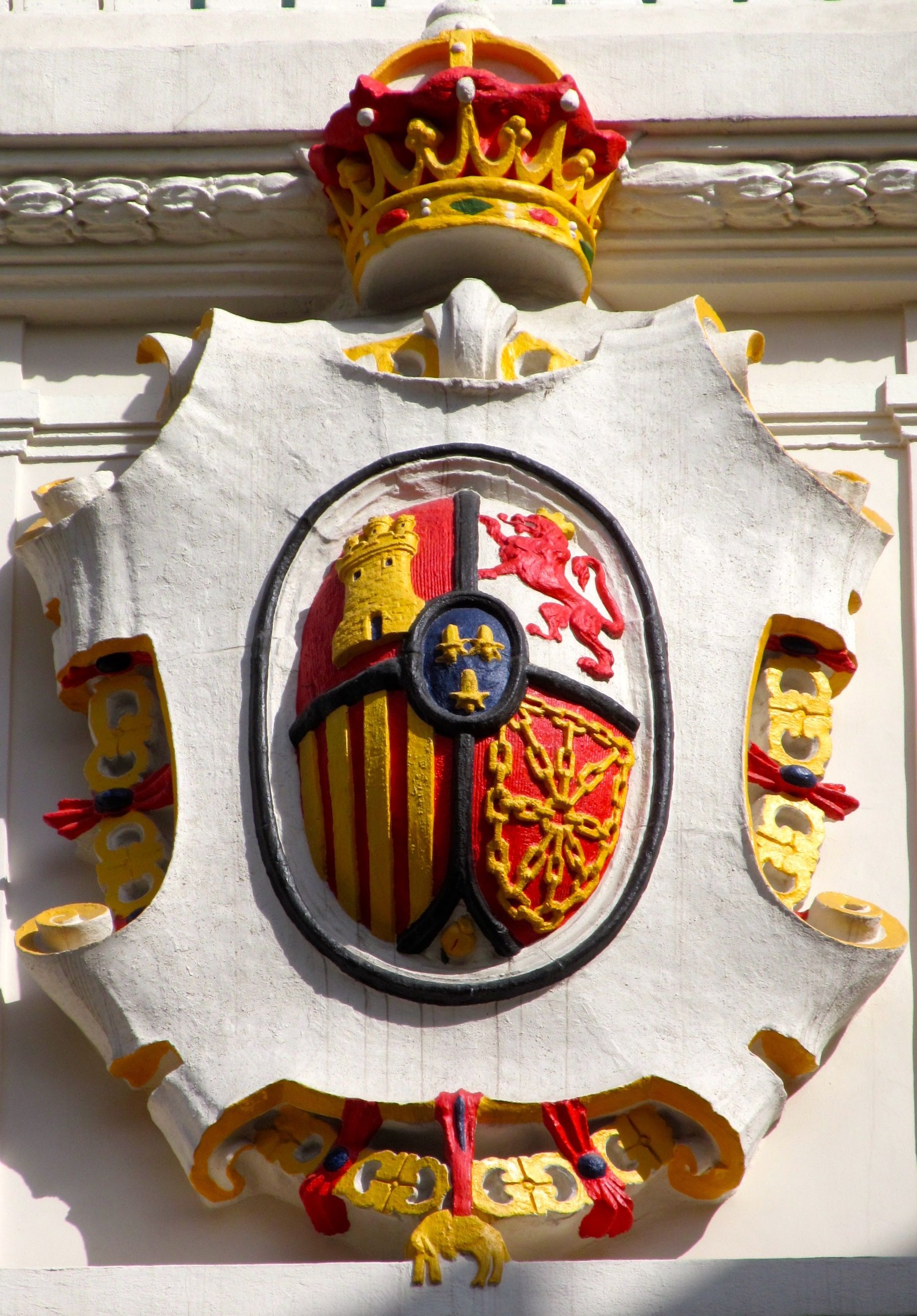
Coat of arms of Spain on back chamfer

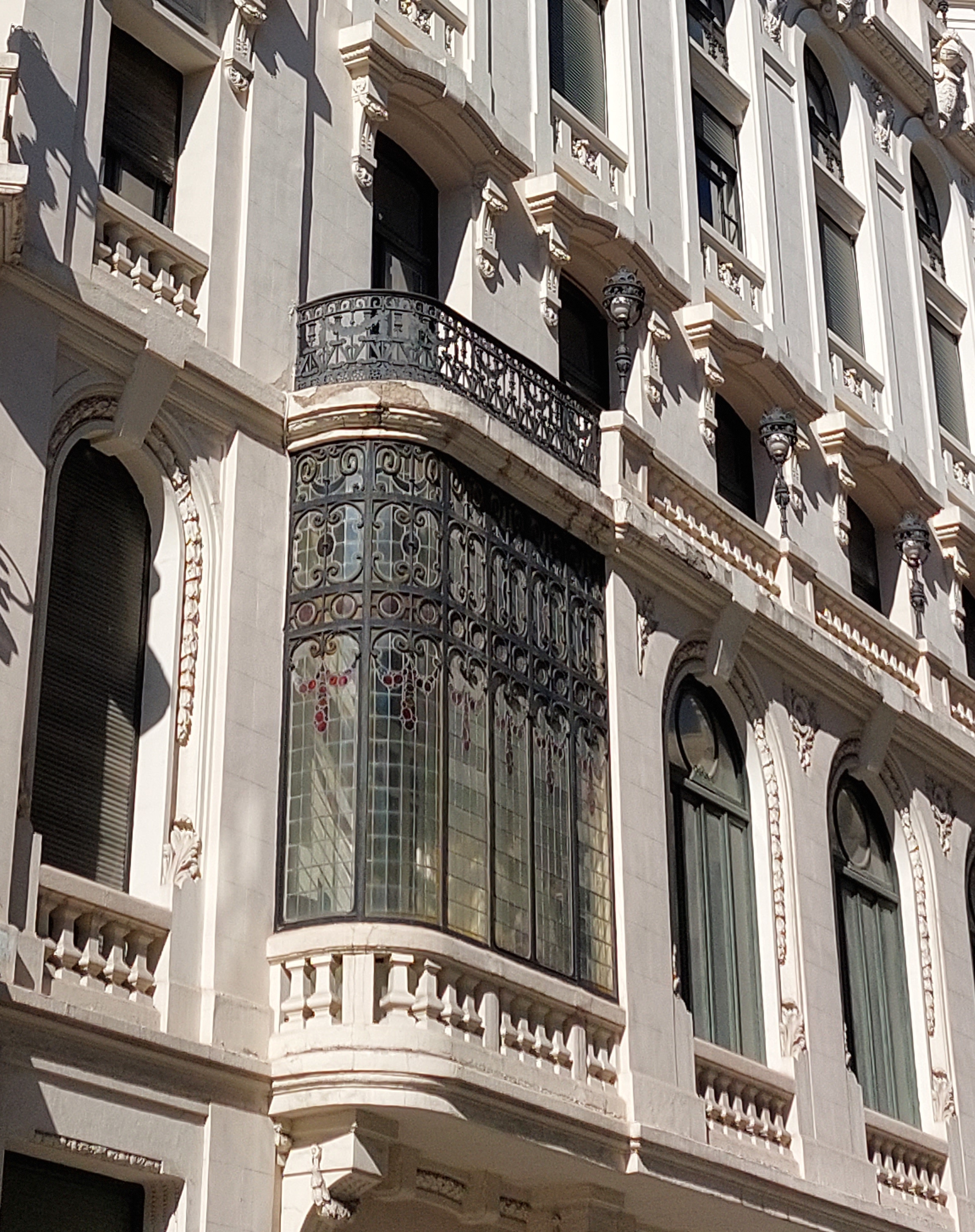
Stained glass windows facing Calle del Clavel

== Bibliography ==
- Castro, Antonio (3 March 2014). El Centro Cultural de los Ejércitos cumple 100 años. Madridiario.
- Gallego, Eduardo (30 November 1916). "El nuevo centro social del Centro del Ejército y de la Armada". La Construcción Moderna (22). Madrid: 313–317. ISSN 1889-8408.
- Guerra Garrido, Raúl (2009). Los cien años y nombres de la Gran Vía. Madrid: Ayuntamiento de Madrid. pp. 15–50.
- León, Pablo (29 January 2015). "Los militares esgrimen en la Gran Vía". El País.
- Medialdea, Sara (21 March 2010). "El Casino Militar, vanguardia civil". ABC. Madrid.
