= Rafael Chirbes =

Spanish writer

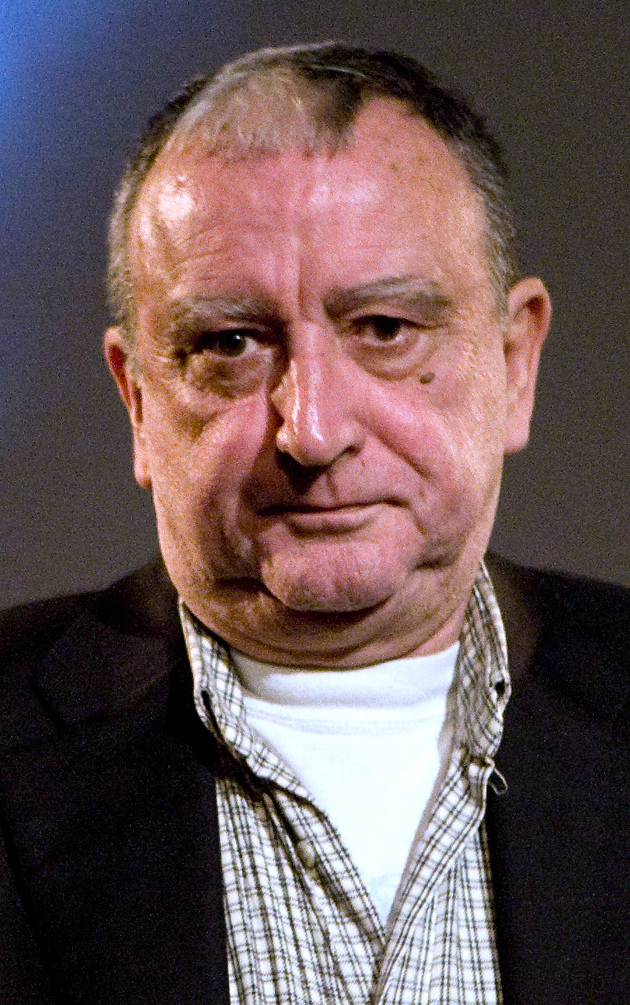
- Rafael Chirbes (2008)
- Born: June 27, 1949; Tavernes de la Valldigna, Spanish State
- Died: August 15, 2015 (aged 66); Beniarbeig, Spain
- Occupations: Writer, literary critic
- Writing career
- Genres: Novel, essay
- Notable awards: Preis der SWR-Bestenliste (1999); Premio Cálamo (2003)

Rafael Chirbes (27 June 1949 – 15 August 2015) was a Spanish novelist. He was born in Tavernes de la Valldigna in Valencia. He is the author of several novels, two of which have won the Premio de la Crítica de narrativa castellana - Crematorio (2007) and En la orilla (2013). The latter also won the Premio Nacional de Narrativa.

Chirbes is further known for his trilogy of novels dealing with postwar Spain (La larga marcha, La caída de Madrid and Los viejos amigos). He also wrote several collections of essays.

His 2007 novel Crematorio was made into an acclaimed television series in 2011.

== Works ==
=== Novels ===
- Mimoun (1988)
- En la lucha final (1991)
- La buena letra (1992)
- Los disparos del cazador (1994)
- La larga marcha (1996)
- La caída de Madrid (2000)
- Los viejos amigos (2003)
- Crematorio (2007). Cremation, trans. Valerie Miles (New Directions, 2021).
- En la orilla (2013). On the Edge, trans. Margaret Jull Costa (New Directions, 2016).
- París-Austerlitz (2016)

=== Essays ===
- Mediterráneos (1997)
- El novelista perplejo (2002)
- El viajero sedentario (2004)
- Por cuenta propia (2010)
