= 74th CEC Awards =

Spanish film awards

- Date: 28 January 2019
- Site: Palacio de la Prensa, Madrid, Spain
- Hosted by: Sandra Escacena; Santiago Alverú
- Organized by: Círculo de Escritores Cinematográficos

Highlights
- Most awards: The Realm (6)
- Most nominations: The Realm (10)

The 74th CEC Medals ceremony, presented by the Círculo de Escritores Cinematográficos, took place on 28 January 2019 at the Palacio de la Prensa in Madrid. The gala was hosted by Sandra Escacena and Santi Alverú.

== Winners and nominees ==
The winners and nominees are listed as follows:

Best Film: The Realm; Champions; Everybody Knows; Journey to a Mother's Room	Best Animation Film: Another Day of Life; Memoirs of a Man in Pajamas; Bikes; Azahar
Best Director: Rodrigo Sorogoyen – The Realm; Javier Fesser – Champions; Asghar Farhadi – Everybody Knows; Carlos Vermut – Quién te cantará	Best New Director: Celia Rico Clavellino – Journey to a Mother's Room; César Esteban Alenda, José Esteban Alenda – Not the End; Arantxa Echevarría – Carmen & Lola; Andrea Jaurrieta – Ana by Day
Best Original Screenplay: Isabel Peña, Rodrigo Sorogoyen – The Realm; Javier Fesser, David Marqués – Champions; Carlos Vermut – Quién te cantará; Asghar Farhadi – Everybody Knows	Best Adapted Screenplay: Álvaro Brechner – A Twelve-Year Night; Paul Laverty – Yuli: The Carlos Acosta Story; Daniel Castro, Marta Suárez, Olatz Arroyo – The Best Summer of My Life; Borja Cobeaga, Diego San José – Superlópez; Natxo López, Marta Sofía Martins – Jefe
Best Actor: Antonio de la Torre – The Realm; Javier Gutiérrez – Champions; Javier Bardem – Everybody Knows; José Coronado – Your Son	Best Actress: Lola Dueñas – Journey to a Mother's Room; Penélope Cruz – Everybody Knows; Bárbara Lennie – Petra; Najwa Nimri – Quién te cantará
Best Supporting Actor: Luis Zahera – The Realm; Eduard Fernández – Everybody Knows; Antonio de la Torre – A Twelve-Year Night; Juan Margallo – Champions	Best Supporting Actress: Anna Castillo – Journey to a Mother's Room; Ana Wagener – The Realm; Bárbara Lennie – Everybody Knows; Natalia de Molina – Quién te cantará
Best New Actor: Jesús Vidal – Champions; Carlos Acosta – Yuli: The Carlos Acosta Story; Moreno Borja – Carmen & Lola; Francisco Reyes – The Realm; Joan Botey Serra – Petra; Joan Pera – Yucatán	Best New Actress: Eva Llorach – Quién te cantará; Gloria Ramos – Champions; Zaira Morales – Carmen & Lola; Rosy Rodríguez – Carmen & Lola
Best Cinematography: Eduard Grau – Quién te cantará; Álex de Pablo – The Realm; Alex Catalán – Yuli: The Carlos Acosta Story; Josu Inchaustegui – Gun City	Best Editing: Alberto del Campo – The Realm; Hayedeh Safiyari – Everybody Knows; Javier Fesser – Champions; Marta Velasco – Quién te cantará
Best Music: Alberto Iglesias – Quién te cantará; Olivier Arson – The Realm; Alberto Iglesias – Yuli: The Carlos Acosta Story; Manuel Riveiro, Xavier Font – Gun City	Best Documentary Film: Sad Hill Unearthed; Camarón: Flamenco y revolución; Apuntes para una película de atracos; The Silence of Others
Best Foreign Film: Roma; Cold War; Shoplifters; Phantom Thread

== Special awards ==
- Honorary Medal: Pilar Bardem
- Medal for the Literary Merit and Promotion of Cinema: Juan José Daza del Castillo
- Medal for the Journalistic Merit: Oti Rodríguez Marchante
- 'Solidaridad' Medal: Todos los caminos
