= 33rd Goya Awards =

- Date: 2 February 2019
- Site: Conference and Exhibition Centre, Seville
- Hosted by: Andreu Buenafuente; Silvia Abril
- Organized by: Academy of Cinematographic Arts and Sciences of Spain

Highlights
- Best Film: Champions
- Best Actor: Antonio de la Torre; The Realm
- Best Actress: Susi Sánchez; Sunday's Illness
- Most awards: The Realm (7)
- Most nominations: The Realm (13)

Television coverage
- Network: TVE
- Viewership: 3.82 million (26.2%)

The 33rd Goya Awards ceremony, presented by the Academy of Cinematographic Arts and Sciences (AACCE), honored the best in Spanish films of 2018 and took place at the Conference and Exhibition Centre of Seville on 2 February 2019. The ceremony was televised in Spain by the Spanish public television (TVE) and was hosted by television presenter and comedian Andreu Buenafuente and actress Silvia Abril. It was also televised for the international public by the TVE Internacional channel. It was the second time that the ceremony was held outside of Madrid, the other one being the 14th edition that took place in Barcelona.

Nominations were announced on 12 December 2018 by Paco León and Rossy de Palma. The Realm received the most nominations with thirteen, followed by Champions with eleven nominations.

Champions won Best Film, as well as Best New Actor and Best Original Song, but The Realm won the most awards, with seven awards, including Best Director, Best Actor, Best Supporting Actor, and Best Original Screenplay.

== Winners and nominees ==
The winners and nominees are listed as follows:

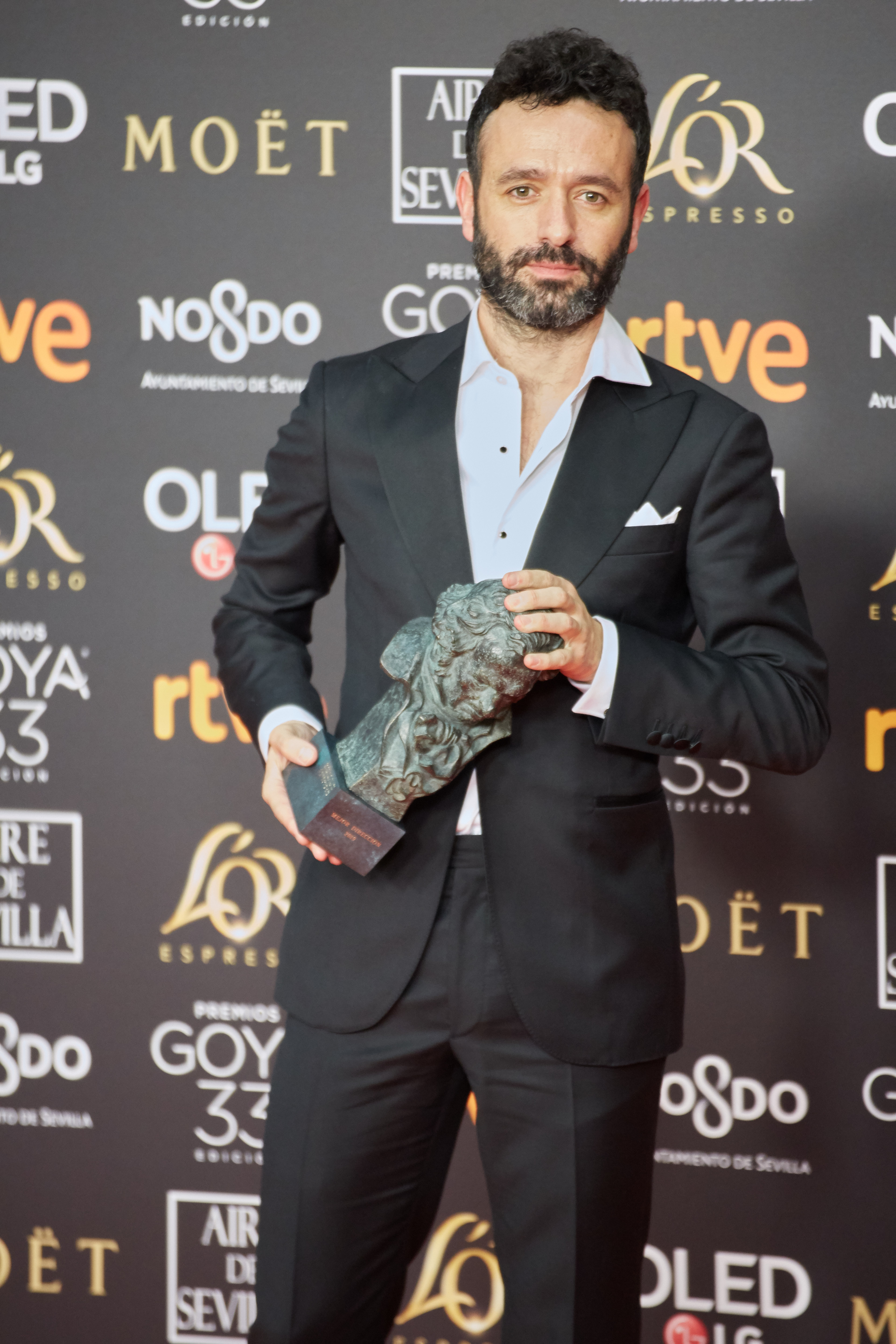
Rodrigo Sorogoyen, Best Director winner

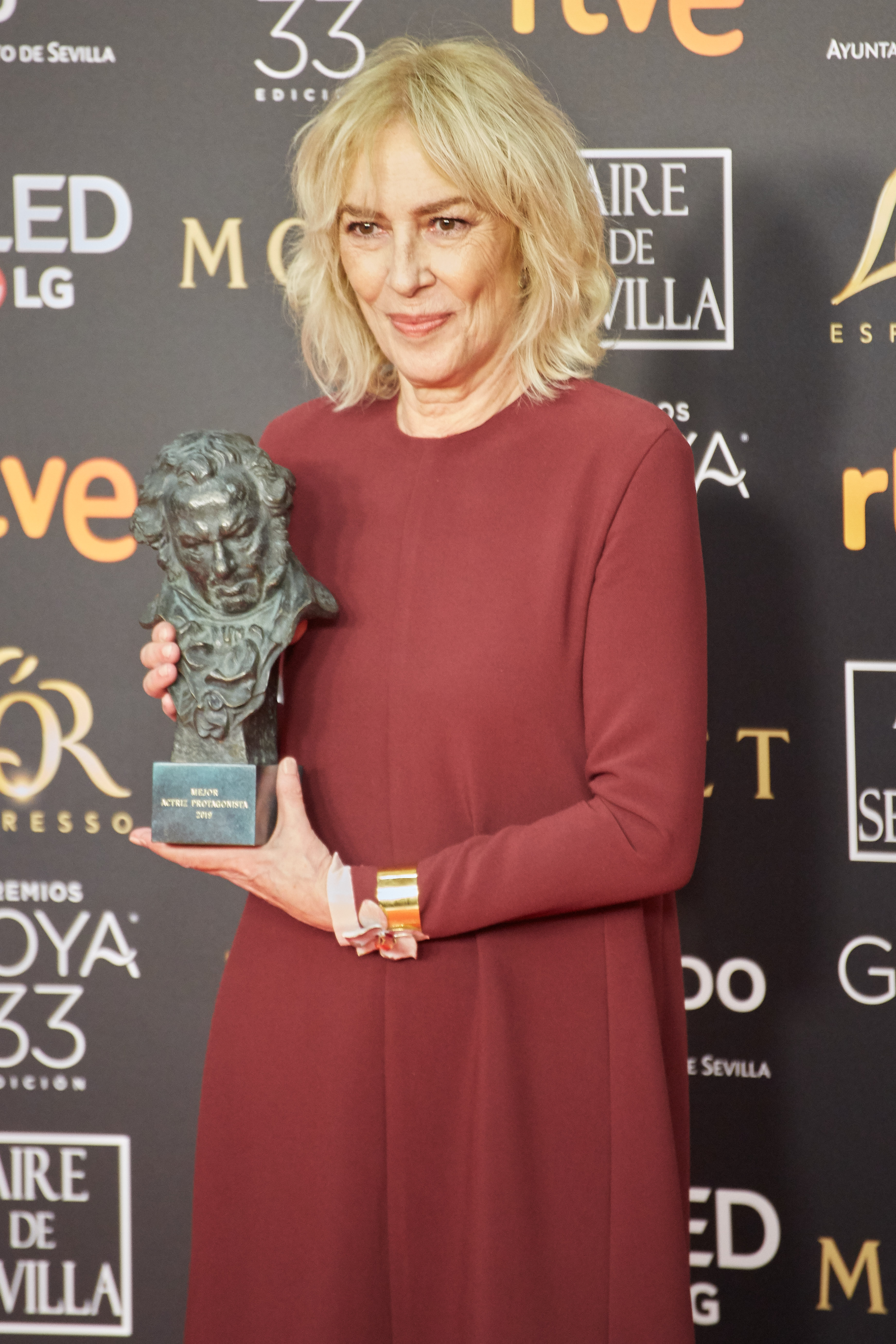
Susi Sánchez, Best Actress winner

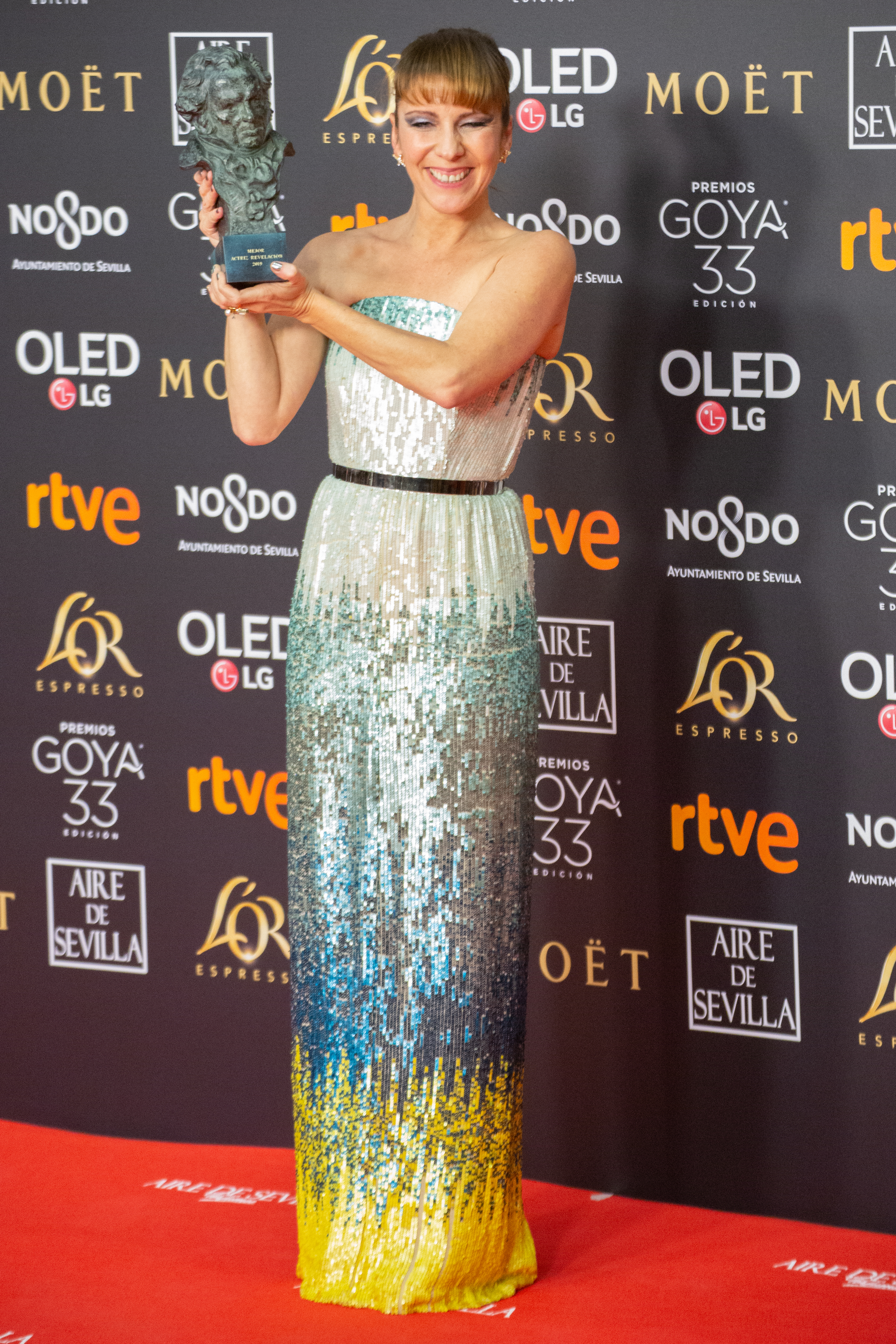
Eva Llorach, Best New Actress winner

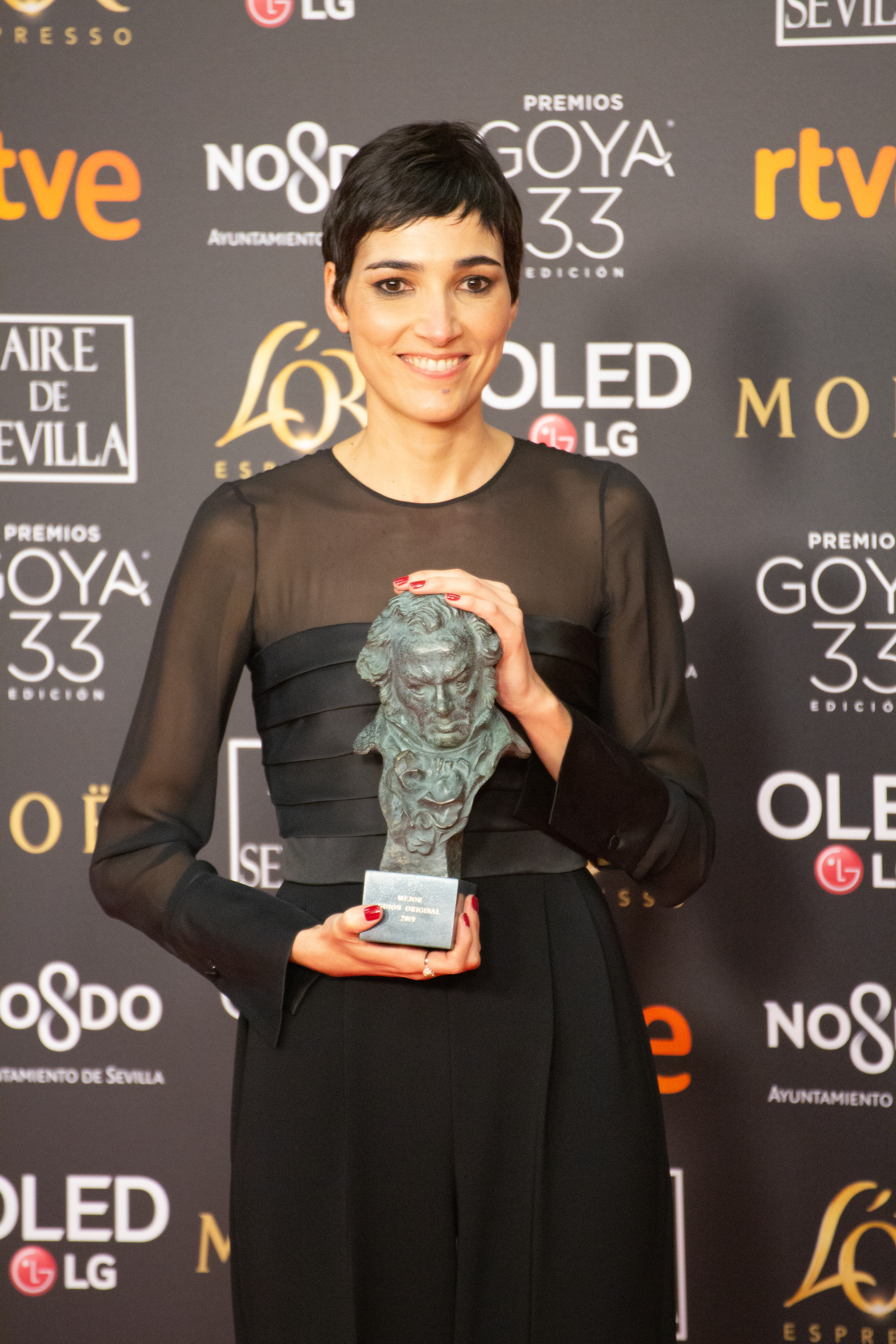
Isabel Peña, Best Original Screenplay winner

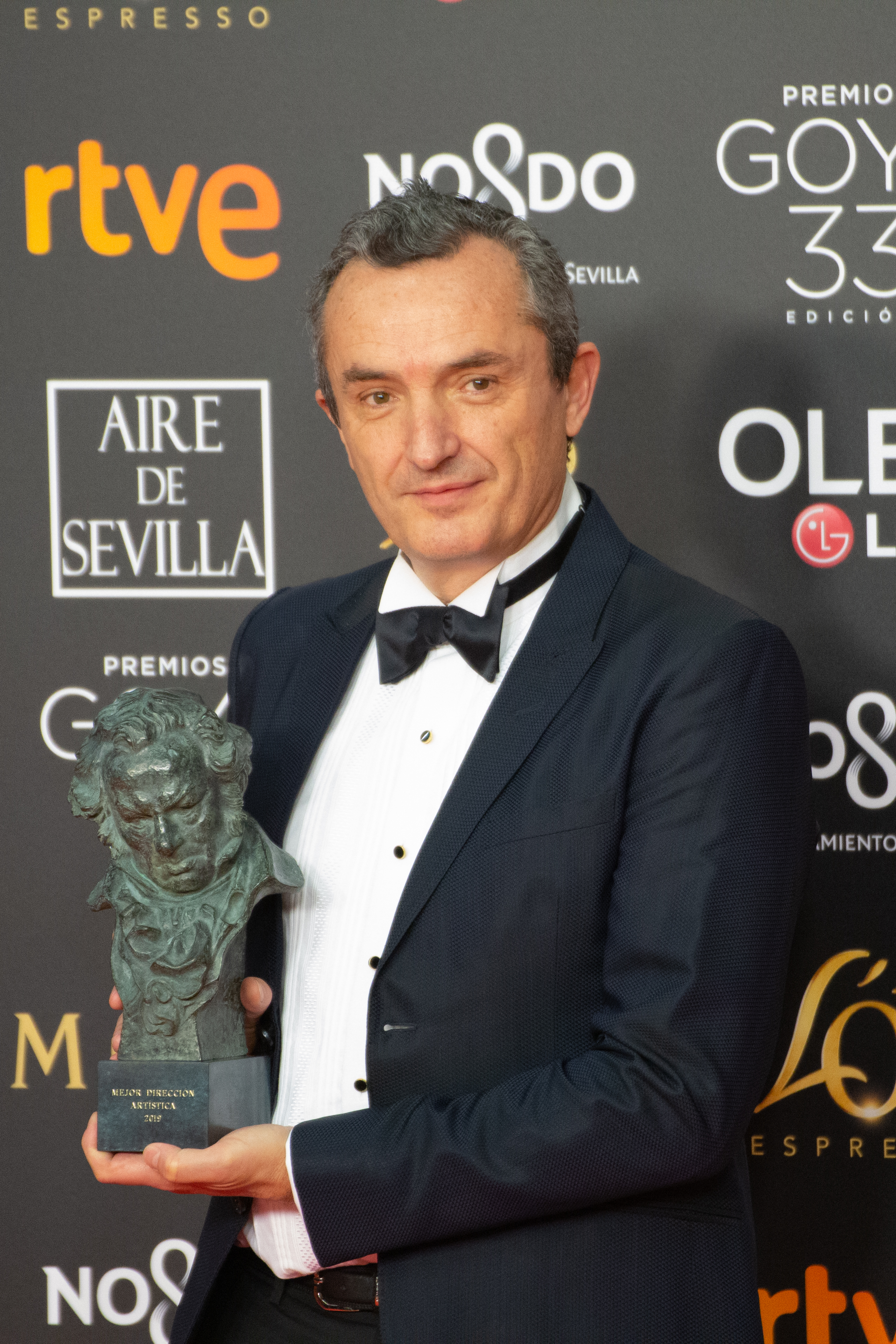
Juan Pedro de Gaspar, Best Art Direction winner

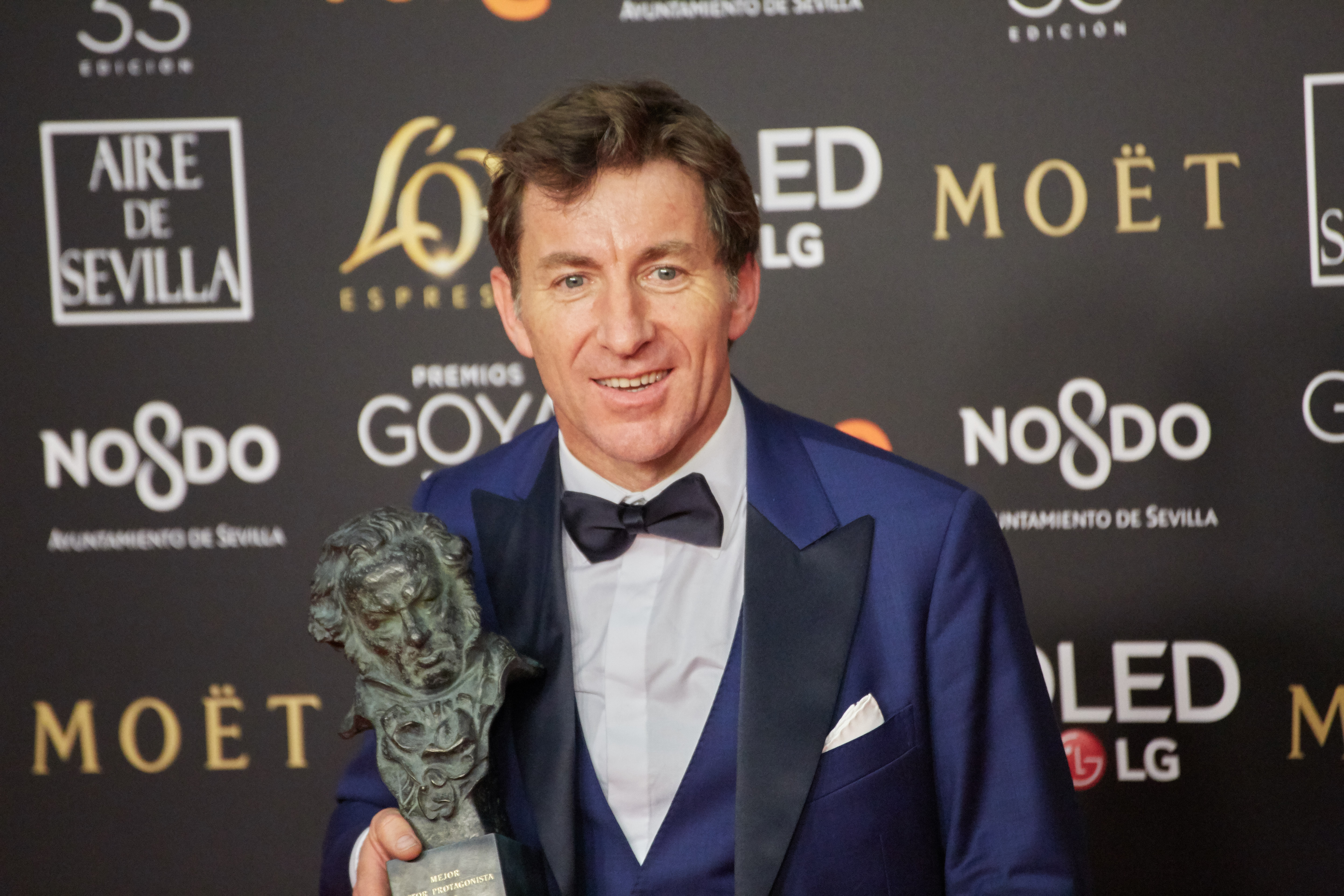
Antonio de la Torre, Best Actor winner

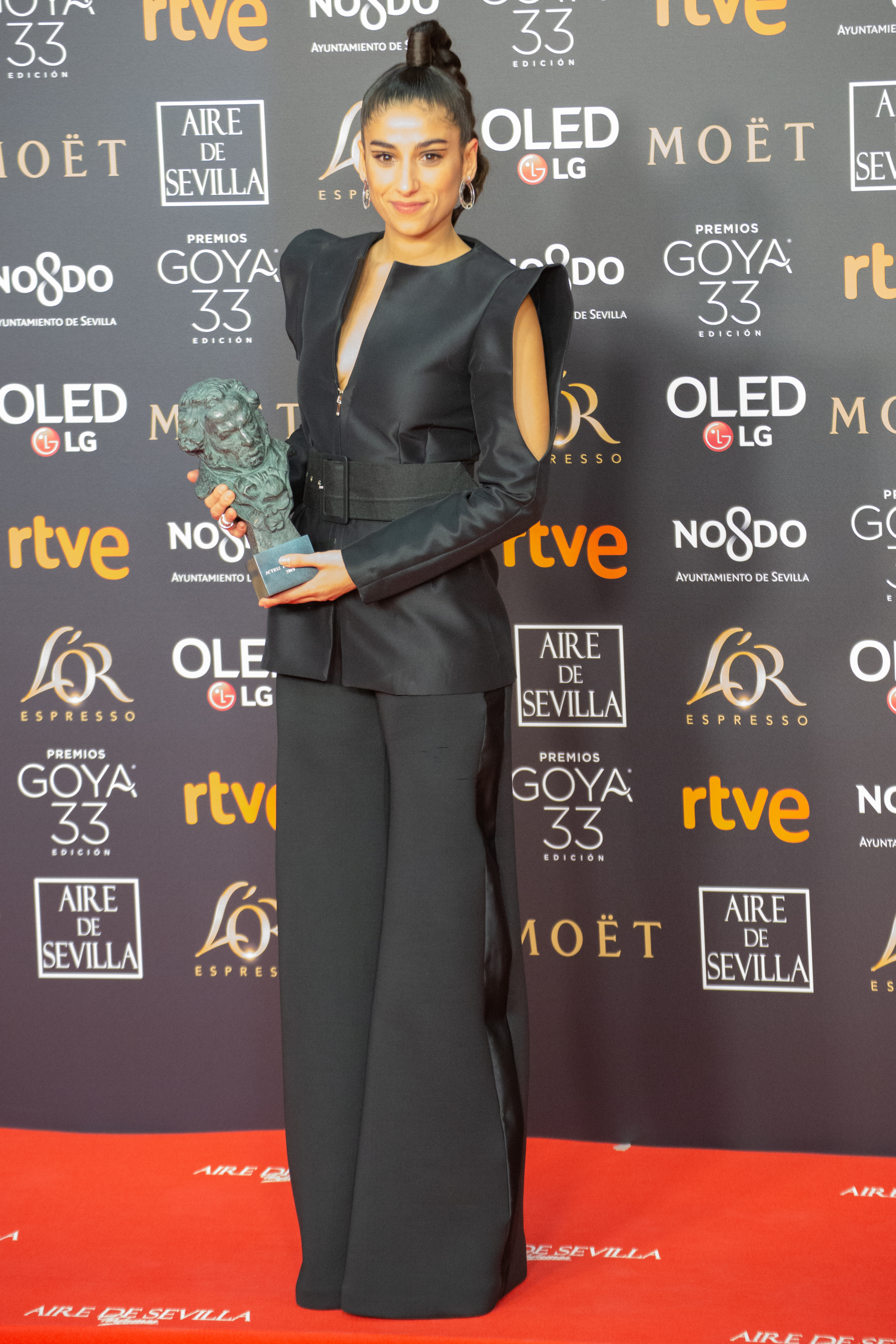
Carolina Yuste, Best Supporting Actress winner

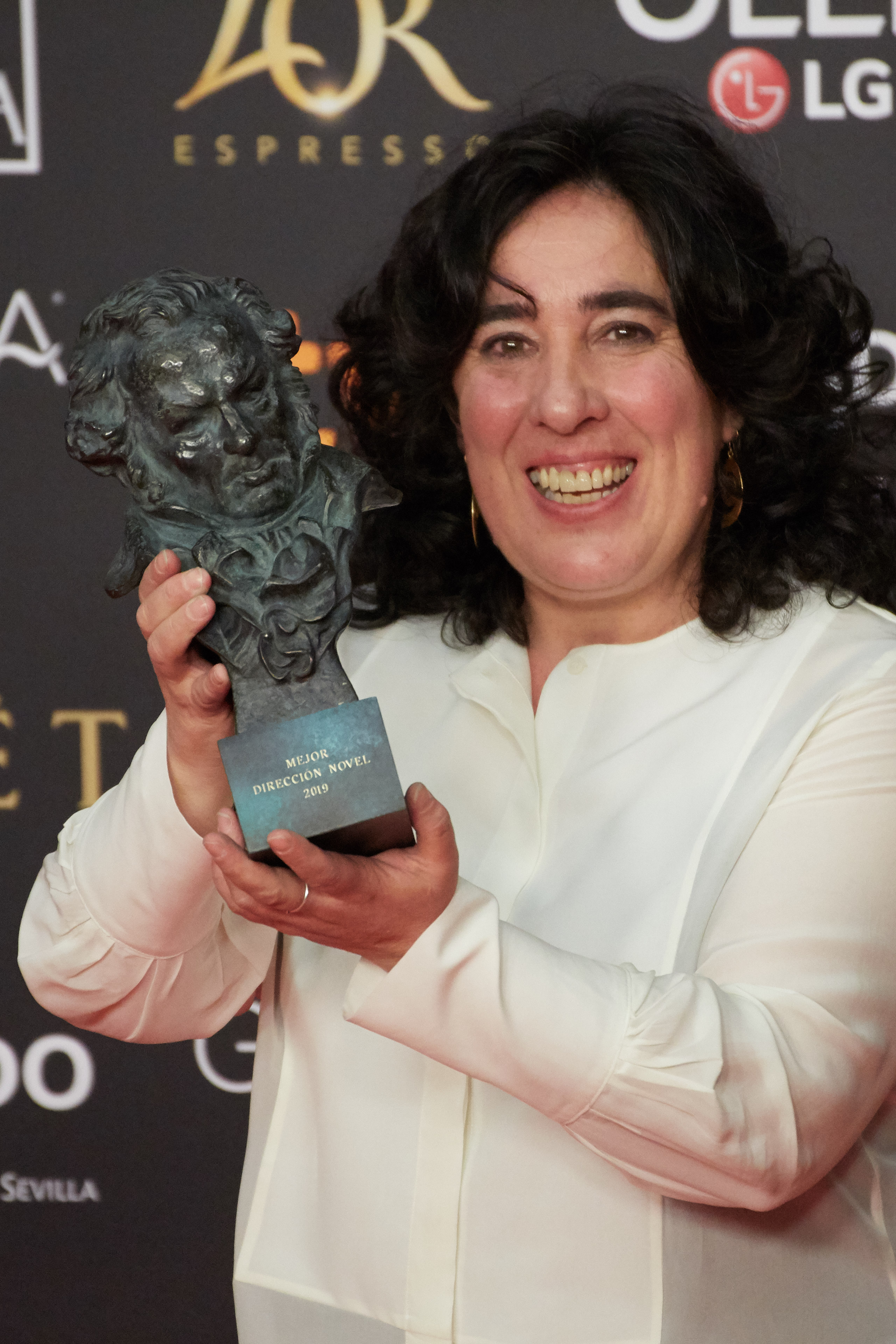
Arantxa Echevarría, Best New Director winner

Best Film: Champions; Carmen & Lola; The Realm; Between Two Waters; Everybody Knows	Best Director: Rodrigo Sorogoyen – The Realm; Javier Fesser – Champions; Isaki Lacuesta – Between Two Waters; Asghar Farhadi – Everybody Knows
Best Actor: Antonio de la Torre – The Realm; Javier Gutiérrez – Champions; Javier Bardem – Everybody Knows; José Coronado – Your Son	Best Actress: Susi Sánchez – Sunday's Illness; Najwa Nimri – Quién te cantará; Penélope Cruz – Everybody Knows; Lola Dueñas – Journey to a Mother's Room
Best Supporting Actor: Luis Zahera – The Realm; Juan Margallo – Champions; Antonio de la Torre – A Twelve-Year Night; Eduard Fernández – Everybody Knows	Best Supporting Actress: Carolina Yuste – Carmen & Lola; Ana Wagener – The Realm; Natalia de Molina – Quién te cantará; Anna Castillo – Journey to a Mother's Room
Best New Actor: Jesús Vidal – Champions; Moreno Borja – Carmen & Lola; Francisco Reyes – The Realm; Carlos Acosta – Yuli	Best New Actress: Eva Llorach – Quién te cantará; Gloria Ramos – Champions; Rosy Rodríguez – Carmen & Lola; Zaira Romero – Carmen & Lola
Best Original Screenplay: Isabel Peña, Rodrigo Sorogoyen – The Realm; David Marqués, Javier Fesser – Champions; Arantxa Echevarría – Carmen & Lola; Asghar Farhadi – Everybody Knows	Best Adapted Screenplay: Álvaro Brechner – A Twelve-Year Night; Marta Sofía Martins, Natxo López – Jefe; Borja Cobeaga, Diego San José – Superlópez; Paul Laverty – Yuli
Best Ibero-American Film: Roma • Mexico; El Angel • Argentina; A Twelve-Year Night • Uruguay; Los perros • Chile	Best European Film: Cold War; Phantom Thread; Girl; The Party
Best New Director: Arantxa Echevarría – Carmen & Lola; Andrea Jaurrieta – Ana by Day; César Esteban Alenda, José Esteban Alenda – Not the End; Celia Rico – Journey to a Mother's Room	Best Animated Film: Another Day of Life; Azahar; Bikes The Movie; Memoirs of a Man in Pajamas
Best Cinematography: Josu Inchaustegui – Gun City; Alejandro de Pablo – The Realm; Eduard Grau – Quién te cantará; Alex Catalán – Yuli	Best Editing: Alberto del Campo – The Realm; Javier Fesser – Champions; Hayedeh Safiyari – Everybody Knows; Fernando Franco – Journey to a Mother's Room
Best Art Direction: Juan Pedro de Gaspar – Gun City; Rosa Ros – The Photographer of Mauthausen; Benjamín Fernández – The Man Who Killed Don Quixote; Balter Gallart – Superlópez	Best Production Supervision: Yousaf Bokhari – The Man Who Killed Don Quixote; Luis Fernández Lago – Champions; Eduard Vallès, Hanga Kurucz – The Photographer of Mauthausen; Iñaki Ros – The Realm
Best Sound: Roberto Fernández, Alfonso Raposo – The Realm; Arman Ciudad, Charly Schmukler, Alfonso Raposo – Champions; Daniel de Zayas, Eduardo Castro, Mario González – Quién te cantará; Eva Valiño, Pelayo Gutiérrez, Alberto Ovejero – Yuli	Best Special Effects: Lluís Rivera, Laura Pedro – Superlópez; Óscar Abades, Helmuth Barnert – The Realm; Jon Serrano, David Heras – Errementari; Lluís Rivera, Félix Bergés – Gun City
Best Costume Design: Clara Bilbao – Gun City; Mercè Paloma – The Photographer of Mauthausen; Lena Mossum – The Man Who Killed Don Quixote; Ana López Cobos – Quién te cantará	Best Makeup and Hairstyles: Sylvie Imbert, Amparo Sánchez, Pablo Perona – The Man Who Killed Don Quixote; Caitlin Acheson, Jesús Martos, Pablo Perona – The Photographer of Mauthausen; Raquel Fidalgo, Noé Montes, Alberto Hortas – Gun City; Rafael Mora, Anabel Beato – Quién te cantará
Best Original Score: Olivier Arson – The Realm; Iván Palomares – En las estrellas; Manuel Riveiro, Xavi Font – Gun City; Alberto Iglesias – Yuli	Best Original Song: "Este es el momento" by Coque Malla – Champions; "Me vas a extrañar" by Paco de la Rosa – Carmen & Lola; "Tarde azul de abril" by Roque Baños and Tessy Díez Martín – The Man Who Killed Don Quixote; "Una de esas noches sin final" by Javier Limón – Everybody Knows
Best Fictional Short Film: Cerdita; 9 pasos; Bailaora; El niño que quería volar; Matria	Best Animated Short Film: Cazatalentos; El olvido; I Wish...; Soy una tumba
Best Documentary Film: The Silence of Others; Apuntes para una película de atracos; Camarón: Flamenco y revolución; Desenterrando Sad Hill	Best Documentary Short Film: Gaza; El tesoro; Kyoko; Wan Xia. La última luz del atardecer

=== Films with multiple nominations and awards ===
Films with multiple nominations
Nominations	Film
13	The Realm
11	Champions
8	Carmen & Lola
8	Everybody Knows
7	Quién te cantará
6	Gun City
5	The Man Who Killed Don Quixote
5	Yuli
4	Journey to a Mother's Room
4	The Photographer of Mauthausen
3	Superlópez
3	A Twelve-Year Night
2	Between Two Waters

Films with multiple awards
Awards	Film
7	The Realm
3	Champions
3	Gun City
2	Carmen & Lola
2	The Man Who Killed Don Quixote

=== Honorary Goya ===
- Narciso Ibáñez Serrador

== Performances ==
The following artists performed musical performances.

Artist	Featuring	Performed
Rosalía	Cor Jove de l'Orfeó Català; El Guincho	"Me quedo contigo"
Amaia; Rozalén; Judit Neddermann	Manu Guix	"Una de esas noches sin final" "Tarde azul de abril" "Me vas a extrañar" "Este es el momento"
James Rhodes		Adagio from Concerto No 3 in D minor, BWV 974 by Bach during the annual "In Memoriam" tribute

== In Memoriam ==
In Memoriam segment was introduced by James Rhodes, who played Adagio from Concerto No 3 in D minor, BWV 974, from Bach. The segment included:

- Álvaro de Luna
- Forges
- Asunción Sancho
- Carmen Alborch
- Carmina Merlo
- Cesáreo Estébanez
- David Calleja
- Edmundo Sanz
- Eduardo McGregor
- Fernando Valgañón
- Francisco Jurado Alcaide
- Gustavo Hernández
- Horacio Valcárcel
- Jaume Genover
- Jaume Migueiz i Domènech
- Javier Aller
- José Grau
- José Cañas
- José María Caparrós
- José María Otero Timón
- José Miguel Hernán
- José Olmo
- José Antonio Pérez Giner
- Josep Lluis Castañer "Sepe"
- Josep Miquel Aixalà Martí
- Joan Munsó Cabús
- Julio César Acera
- Macario Gómez Quibus
- Manuel Veiga
- Margarita Pardo Robles
- Margot Prieto
- Marisa Porcel
- Pepe Mediavilla
- Ramón Moya
- Ricardo García de Navarrete
- Román Mañoso
- Santiago Moncada
- Sergio Ramis
- Toni Socias
- Yvonne Blake
