= Rosy Rodríguez =

Spanish actress of Romani origin (born 1990)

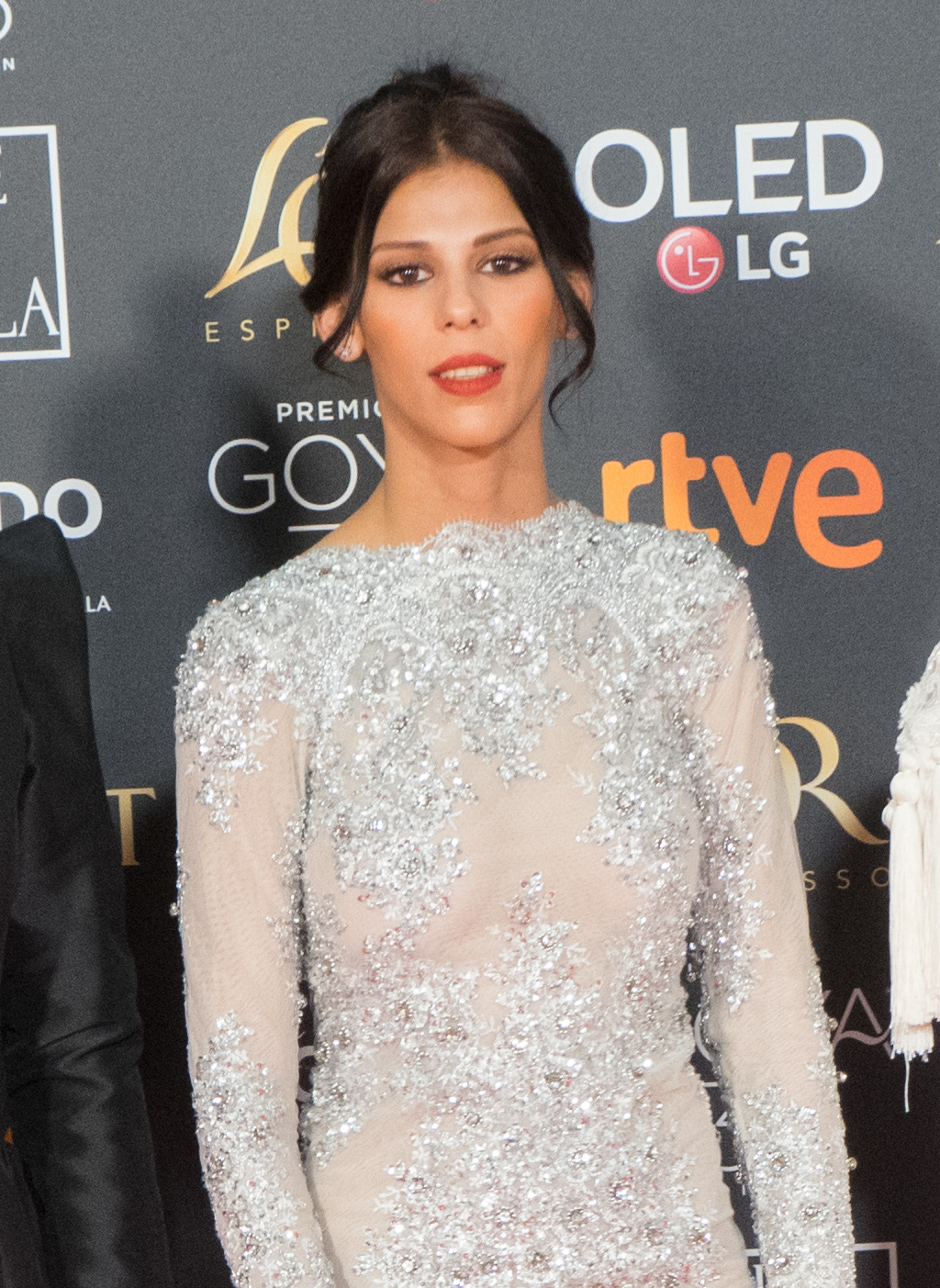
- Born: Rosa Rodríguez; 1999 (age 25–26)
- Occupation: Actress
- Years active: 2018–present
- Notable work: Carmen y Lola

Rosy Rodríguez (born Rosa Rodríguez, 1999) is a Spanish actress of Romani origin. She is best known for her debut role as Carmen in the 2018 film Carmen y Lola, for which she received a Goya Award nomination for Best New Actress. Despite having no prior acting experience, she was discovered through street casting and became a breakthrough performer in Spanish cinema.

== Early life and background ==
Rodríguez was born in Seville in 1999 and raised within the Romani community. Before entering the film industry, she had no professional acting experience or formal training in performance arts.

== Career ==
=== Carmen y Lola (2018) ===
Rodríguez was discovered through street casting for the film Carmen y Lola, directed by Arantxa Echevarría. The film tells the story of a lesbian relationship between two young Romani women, challenging traditional expectations within their conservative community. Rodríguez played the title character Carmen, opposite Zaira Romero as Lola.

The film addressed themes of sexual identity, tradition, and freedom within the Romani community, with Rodríguez's character representing the struggle between personal desires and cultural expectations. The phrase "Las gitanas, por no tener, no tenemos ni sueños" (Gypsy women, for not having, we don't even have dreams) from the film became a rallying cry for Romani women's rights and representation.

Her performance earned critical acclaim and a nomination for the Goya Award for Best New Actress at the 33rd Goya Awards.

=== Later work ===
Following the success of Carmen y Lola, Rodríguez decided to pursue formal acting training to develop her craft professionally. She has since appeared in the Netflix series Jaguar (2021), continuing her acting career in Spanish television and cinema.

== Personal life ==
Rodríguez has spoken about the importance of her family's support, particularly from her husband, in allowing her to take on the challenging role in Carmen y Lola.

== Filmography ==
| Year | Title | Role | Notes |
|---|---|---|---|
| 2018 | Carmen y Lola | Carmen | Film debut |
| 2021 | Jaguar | Supporting role | Netflix series |

== Awards and nominations ==
| Year | Award | Category | Work | Result |
|---|---|---|---|---|
| 2019 | Goya Awards | Best New Actress | Carmen y Lola | Nominated |
| 2019 | CEC Awards | Best New Actress | Carmen y Lola | Nominated |
