= Susi Sánchez =

Spanish actress

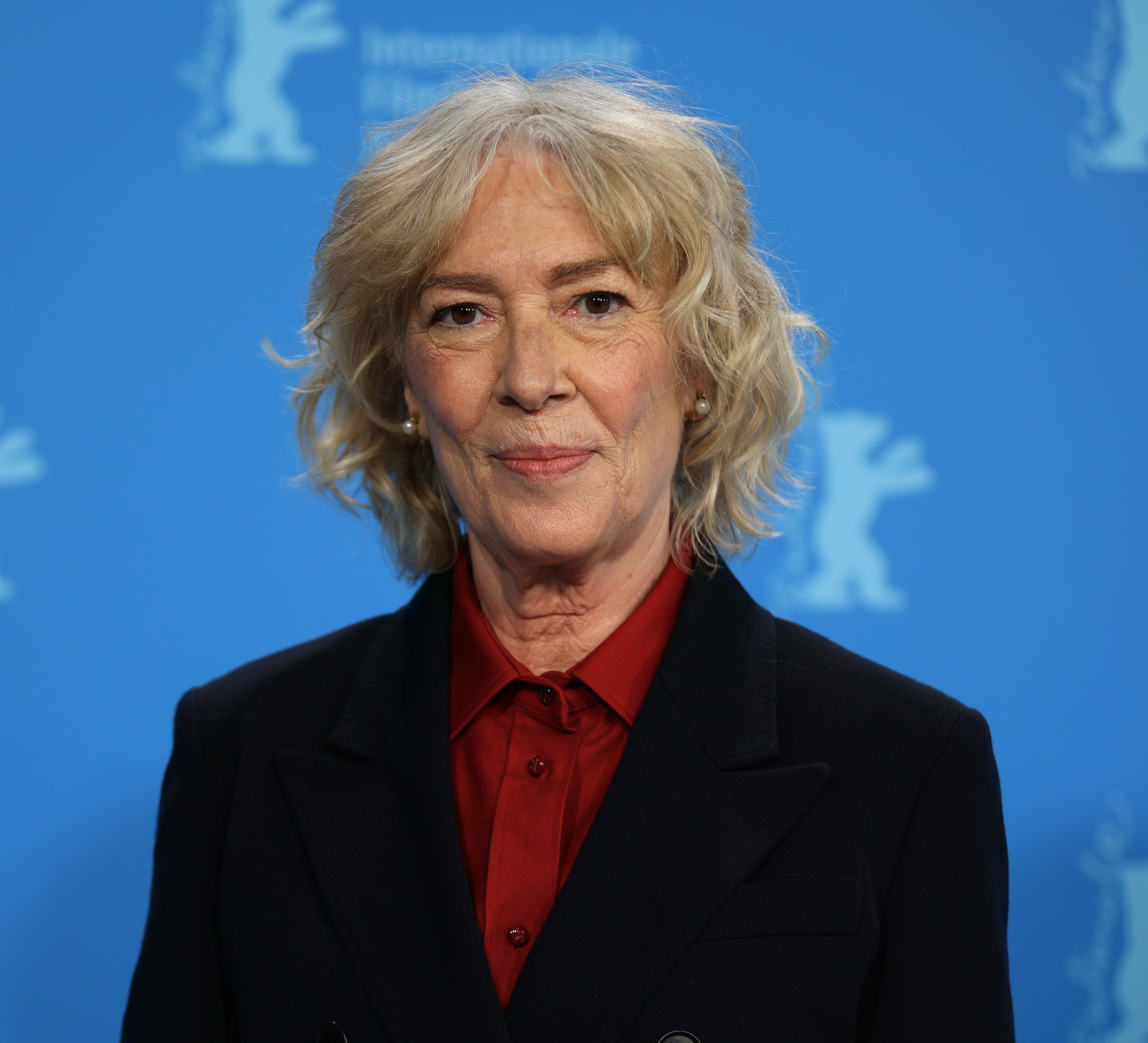
- Sánchez at the 2022 Berlinale
- Born: Asunción Sánchez Abellán; 21 March 1955 (age 71); Valencia, Spain
- Occupation: Actress
- Relatives: Ruth Gabriel (niece)

Asunción Sánchez Abellán (born 21 March 1955), known as Susi Sánchez, is a Spanish theater, film, and television actress.

== Career ==
Susi Sánchez is best known for her roles in the Vicente Aranda film Mad Love, where she gives life to Queen Isabella I, and in the plays Cara de plata and Mujeres soñaron caballos. For these three roles she was nominated for the Spanish Actors and Actresses Union Awards, winning as Best Supporting Actress for her performance in Cara de plata.

In 2015 she joined the cast of the TV series Carlos, rey emperador, playing Louise of Savoy.

== Personal life ==
Susi Sánchez was the long-time romantic partner of actress and acting coach Consuelo Trujillo. The two attended numerous Gay Pride events and spoken out in favor of LGBT rights. Her niece Ruth Gabriel (daughter of actor Ismael Abellán, Susi Sánchez's elder brother) is also an actress.

== Theater ==
- 1993: Las bizarrías de Belisa – Dir. John Strasberg
- 1994: Los bosques de Nyx – Dir. Miguel Bosé
- 1995: Castillos en el aire – Dir. José Luis Gómez
- 1997: King Lear – Dir. Miguel Narros
- 1999: Mujeres al vapor – Dir. Consuelo Trujillo
- 2001: Ausencias – Dir. Rosa Morales
- 2004: Exit the King – Dir. José Luis Gómez
- 2005: Cara de plata – Dir. Ramón Simó – Centro Dramático Nacional
- 2006: Suddenly Last Summer – Dir. José Luis Saiz
- 2007: Dirección gritadero - Dir. Rosa Morales – Centro Dramático Nacional
- 2007: Mujeres soñaron caballos – Dir. Daniel Veronese
- 2009: Hamlet - Dir. Tomaž Pandur
- 2010: Endgame – Dir. Krystian Lupa
- 2012: Los hijos se han dormido – Dir. Daniel Veronese
- 2013: Tirano Banderas – Dir. Oriol Broggi
- 2015: Good People – Dir. David Serrano
- 2015: Cuando deje de llover – Dir. Julián Fuentes Reta

== Filmography ==
=== Films ===
Year	Title	Role	Notes	Ref.
1974	Una pareja... distinta			
1994	Al otro lado del túnel	Marisa		
1995	Una casa en las afueras (A House on the Outskirts)	Teresa		
1995	Entre rojas	Flora		
1995	Felicidades, Tovarich			
1996	Zapico	Exmujer		
1996	Malena es un nombre de tango	Jimena		
1996	Náufragos	Pilar		
1997	Sólo se muere dos veces	Producer		
1998	The Naked Eye	Judge		
1998	Las ratas	Doña Resu		
2000	Aunque tú no lo sepas	Ángela		
2000	Cascabel	Doña Gertru		
2001	Juana la Loca (Mad Love)	Isabel la Católica		
2002	La vida de nadie (Nobody's Life)	School director		
2002	Stones	Manager		
2003	Carmen	Blanca		
2003	La vida mancha (Life Marks)	Director of the INEM		
2003	I'm Not Scared	Mother of Filippo		
2004	Incautos	Mother of Miriam		
2008	El patio de mi cárcel (My Prison Yard)	Julia		
2008	Yo sólo miro (short)	Julia		
2009	The Milk of Sorrow	Aída		
2011	10.000 noches en ninguna parte (10,000 Nights Nowhere)	The Mother		
2011	La piel que habito (The Skin I Live In)	Mother of Vicente		
2011	La voz dormida (The Sleeping Voice)	Sor Serafines		
2012	La fotógrafa	Sara		
2013	15 años y un día (15 Years and One Day)	Cati		
2013	Los amantes pasajeros (I'm So Excited!)	Mother of Alba		
2015	Tras bambalinas	Mother		
2015	Lejos del mar	Concha		
2015	Truman	Adoptive woman		
2016	Julieta	Sara, mother of Julieta		
2017	The Invisible Guardian	Rosario		
2018	La enfermedad del domingo (Sunday's Illness)	Anabel		
2019	Dolor y gloria (Pain and Glory)	Beata del pueblo		
2021	El sustituto (The Replacement)	Eva actual	Younger version of the character played by Vicky Luengo	
2021	El lodo (Wetland)	Francisca		
2022	Cinco lobitos (Lullaby)	Begoña		
2022	Vasil	Carmen		
2023	Loli Tormenta (Stormy Lola)	Lola		
2024	Reinas	Grandmother		
2025	Esto también pasará (This Too Shall Pass)	Elena		
2026	The Bad Son (El mal hijo)	Pascuala		

=== TV series ===
- 1983: Anillos de oro – La 1
- 1985: Platos rotos – La 1
- 1995: ¡Ay, Señor, Señor! – Antena 3
- 1995–1997: Médico de familia – Telecinco
- 1997: La casa de los líos – Antena 3
- 1997: Todos los hombres sois iguales – Telecinco
- 1998: Manos a la obra – Antena 3
- 2001: Cuéntame cómo pasó – La 1
- 2002: Hospital Central – Telecinco
- 2001–2004: El comisario – Telecinco
- 2006: Vientos de agua – Telecinco
- 2007: MIR – Telecinco
- 2009–2010: La Señora – La 1
- 2009–2010: Hay alguien ahí – Cuatro
- 2010: Crematorio – Canal+
- 2010: Acusados – Telecinco
- 2011: Ángel o demonio – Telecinco
- 2014: Gran Hotel – Antena 3
- 2014: Los misterios de Laura – La 1
- 2015: Carlos, rey emperador – La 1
- 2018: La verdad – Telecinco
- 2018: Presunto culpable – Antena 3

=== TV movies ===
- 1986: Bodas de sangre – Dir. Francisco Montolio
- 2004: El cruce – Dir. Juan Carlos Claver
- 2006: Electroshock – Dir. Juan Carlos Claver
- 2007: Alan muere al final de la película – Dir. Xavier Manich

== Accolades ==
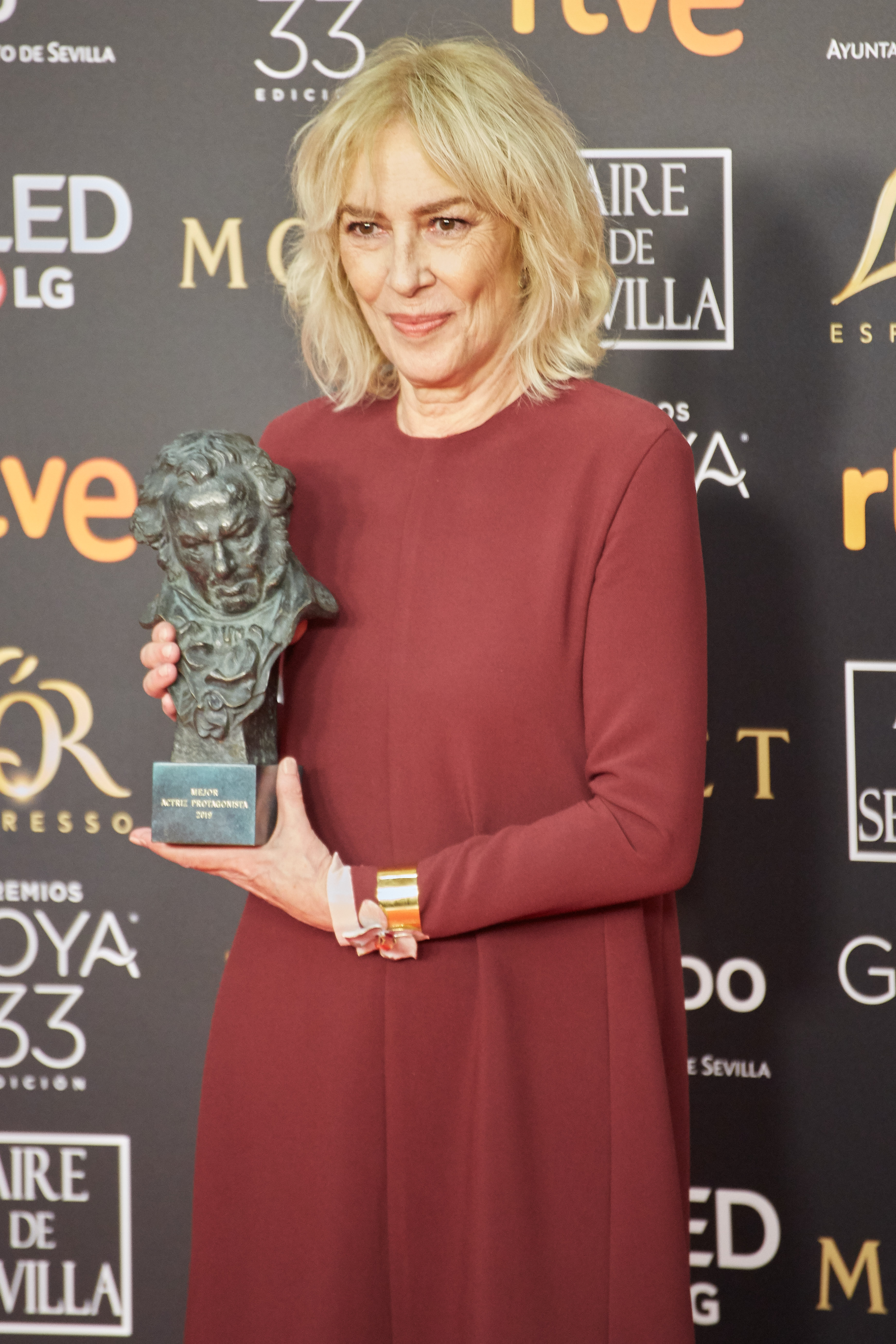
Holding her 2019 Goya Award

Year	Award	Category	Work	Result	Ref.
2002	11th Actors Union Awards	Best Film Performance in a Minor Role	Mad Love	Nominated	
2006	15th Actors and Actresses Union Awards	Best Stage Actress in a Secondary Role	Cara de plata	Won	
2008	17th Actors and Actresses Union Awards	Best Stage Actress in a Secondary Role	Mujeres soñaron caballos	Nominated	
2012	21st Actors and Actresses Union Awards	Best Film Actress in a Minor Role	The Skin I Live In	Nominated	
2014	28th Goya Awards	Best Supporting Actress	10,000 Nights Nowhere	Nominated	
2014	23rd Actors and Actresses Union Awards	Best Film Actress in a Leading Role	10,000 Nights Nowhere	Won	
2015	24th Actors and Actresses Union Awards	Best Stage Actress in a Minor Role	Cuando deje de llover	Won	
2015	18th Max Awards	Best Supporting Actress	Cuando deje de llover	Won	
2016	25th Actors and Actresses Union Awards	Best Television Actress in a Secondary Role	Carlos, rey emperador	Won	
2019	33rd Goya Awards	Best Leading Actress	Sunday's Illness	Won	
2019	28th Actors and Actresses Union Awards	Best Film Actress in a Leading Role	Sunday's Illness	Won	
2020	29th Actors and Actresses Union Awards	Best Film Actress in a Minor Role	Pain and Glory	Nominated	
2021	4th Berlanga Awards	Best Supporting Actress	Wetland	Nominated	
2022	5th Berlanga Awards	Best Supporting Actress	Vasil	Won	
2022	28th Forqué Awards	Best Film Actress	Lullaby	Nominated	
2023	10th Feroz Awards	Best Supporting Actress in a Film	Lullaby	Won	
2023	37th Goya Awards	Best Supporting Actress	Lullaby	Won	
2023	31st Actors and Actresses Union Awards	Best Film Actress in a Secondary Role	Lullaby	Won	
2023	10th Platino Awards	Best Supporting Actress	Lullaby	Won	
2025	33rd Actors and Actresses Union Awards	Best Actress in an International Production	Reinas	Nominated	
