= Sunday's Illness =

2018 film

- Film poster
- Spanish: La enfermedad del domingo
- Directed by: Ramón Salazar
- Screenplay by: Ramón Salazar
- Produced by: Francisco Ramos
- Starring: Bárbara Lennie; Susi Sánchez; Greta Fernández; Richard Bohringer; Miguel Ángel Solá
- Cinematography: Ricardo de Gracia
- Edited by: Teresa Font
- Music by: Nico Casal
- Production companies: Zeta Cinema; On Cinema 2017 AIE
- Distributed by: Caramel Films
- Release dates: 20 February 2018 (Berlinale); 23 February 2018 (Spain)
- Running time: 113 minutes
- Country: Spain
- Language: Spanish

Sunday's Illness (Spanish: La enfermedad del domingo) is a 2018 Spanish drama film directed by Ramón Salazar which stars Bárbara Lennie and Susi Sánchez alongside Greta Fernández, Richard Bohringer and Miguel Ángel Solá. It was screened in the Panorama section at the 68th Berlin International Film Festival.

== Plot ==
Anabel is hosting a large dinner party and recognises one of the catering staff as Chiara, the daughter she has not seen since she abandoned her at the age of eight over thirty years ago. She arranges to meet Chiara to find out why she has re-appeared. Chiara requests that she spend 10 days with her. Anabel's husband and the family lawyer are suspicious of Chiara's motives, but after she agrees to sign a contract waiving any rights she had as a family member, they agree to the plan. Before leaving, Anabel informs her other, younger, daughter that she has a half-sister, who then asks her to be kind to Chiara.

Chiara drives Anabel into the countryside to a remote community where she lives in her childhood home. During the following days the tensions build between the two women, and Chiara refuses to reveal what she wants to achieve, saying that she doesn't need or want to forgive Anabel. One night Chiara becomes drunk during a party and a man tries to take advantage of her but Anabel comes to the rescue and carries her home safely but she passes out for a day. The next day after giving Anabel some magic mushroom infused tea, Chiara tells her that she is seriously ill. The next day, during an excursion on a sled, Chiara becomes sick and is taken to hospital. Anabel is told the extent of Chiara's condition by the staff.

They return home and Anabel asks Chiara how she can help her. Chiara states that she only wants one thing and if Anabel won't do it she can leave. She whispers in Anabel's ear and immediately afterwards Anabel packs her belongings and departs. She travels to Paris and meets with Chiara's father. They discuss their previous relationship in dispassionate terms, before the conversation turns to Chiara. Her father said that he offered to help her but she refused. Anabel returns to the farmhouse and finds Chiara collapsed but conscious nearby. She then carries her to the lake and then tenderly undresses her and carries her into the water. Chiara says that she is not afraid and Anabel slowly lowers her into the water, holding her under until she stops struggling.

== Cast ==
- Susi Sánchez as Anabel
- Bárbara Lennie as Chiara
- Richard Bohringer as Matthieu
- David Kammenos as Matthieu Joven
- Bruna González as Chiara Niña
- Greta Fernández as Greta
- Miguel Ángel Solá as Bernabé
- Manuel Castillo as Jefe Protocolo
- Ima Ranedo as Señora Cena
- Mònica Van Campen as Mujer Cena
- Fred Adenis as Tobías
- Iván Morales as Guillem
- Carla Linares as Asistente
- Abdellatif Hwidar as Lugareńo
- Lucy Tillett as Mujer Bosque

== Production ==
Sunday's Illness is a Zeta Cinema and On Cinema 2017 production, and it had collaboration from RTVE, TV3, ICAA, ICEC and ICO. Filming began on 20 February 2017 in Barcelona.

== Release ==
The film was presented at the 68th Berlin International Film Festival (Berlinale) in February 2018, screened out in the Panorama section. Distributed by Caramel Films, the film was theatrically released in Spain on 23 February 2018.

== Reception ==
On review aggregator website Rotten Tomatoes, the film holds an approval rating of 89% based on 19 reviews, and an average rating of 6.9/10.

Wendy Ide of ScreenDaily wrote that "both [Sánchez and Lennie's] performances are phenomenally good; the two women who at first seem like opposites are gradually drawn together by something primal and unbreakable".

Jonathan Holland of The Hollywood Reporter described the film as "beautifully crafted, spectral and emotionally punchy", also considering that it is "marvelously played by Spanish actors Susi Sanchez and Barbara Lennie".

== Accolades ==
Year	Award	Category	Nominee(s)	Result	Ref.
2019	6th Feroz Awards	Best Director	Ramón Salazar	Nominated	
2019	6th Feroz Awards	Best Original Score	Nico Casal	Nominated	
2019	6th Feroz Awards	Best Film Poster	Jordi Rins	Nominated	
2019	33rd Goya Awards	Best Actress	Susi Sánchez	Won	
2019	28th Actors and Actresses Union Awards	Best Film Actress in a Leading Role	Susi Sánchez	Won	
2019	28th Actors and Actresses Union Awards	Best Film Actress in a Leading Role	Bárbara Lennie	Nominated	

== See also ==
- List of Spanish films of 2018
