= Wetland (film) =

- Poster
- Spanish: El lodo
- Directed by: Iñaki Sánchez Arrieta
- Screenplay by: Iñaki Sánchez Arrieta
- Produced by: Ramiro Acero
- Starring: Raúl Arévalo; Paz Vega; Roberto Álamo; Joaquín Climent; Susi Sánchez
- Cinematography: Guillem Oliver
- Edited by: Marta Salas
- Music by: Xema Fuertes; Amadeo Moscardó
- Production companies: Sunrise Pictures; El Lodo la película AIE; Telespan 2000
- Distributed by: Vértice 360
- Release dates: 15 October 2021 (Valencia); 12 December 2021 (Spain)
- Country: Spain
- Language: Spanish

Wetland (Spanish: El lodo; transl. 'The Mud') is a 2021 Spanish thriller film directed by Iñaki Sánchez Arrieta which stars Raúl Arévalo and Paz Vega alongside Joaquín Climent, Roberto Álamo and Susi Sánchez.

== Plot ==
A biologist returns to his native land amid a dire drought episode and tries to protect the environment, but he meets opposition from the locals.

== Cast ==
- Raúl Arévalo as Ricardo
- Paz Vega as Claudia
- Joaquín Climent as Eusebio
- Roberto Álamo as Tomás
- Susi Sánchez as Francisca
- Juan Gea as Inspector Baños
- Daniela Casas

== Production ==
The film was produced by Sunrise Pictures alongside El Lodo la película AIE, in association with Telespan 2000, with participation of À Punt Media and support from the Institut Valenciá de Cultura. It was shot in the natural park of La Albufera and its surroundings.

== Release ==
The film screened as the opening film of the 36th Mostra de València in October 2021. Distributed by Vértice, it was initially slated for a 29 October 2021 theatrical release in Spain. The release date was eventually postponed to 10 December 2021.

== Reception ==
Toni Vall of Cinemanía rated the film 3½ out of 5 stars, underscoring it to be a "magnetic tale of scattered violence and social criticism".

Manuel J. Lombardo of Diario de Sevilla scored 2 out of 5 stars assessing that the film gets bogged down in its own redundancies amid dramatic effects and a sensationalist drift.

Elsa Fernández-Santos of El País considered that the film contributes nothing to the environmental dilemma posed by Susi Sánchez' character and "remains in the trite and superficial metaphor of the muddy waters, of the primitive men of the countryside versus those of the city".

Raquel Hernández Luján of HobbyConsolas scored 68 out of 100 points ("acceptable"), writing that the film "works well as a wake-up call on environmental issues and manages to exploit the landscapes to create an unsettling atmosphere", while citing as negative points that the thriller side of the film works in fits and starts and that there are overacted secondary characters detracting from the story.

== Accolades ==
Year	Award	Category	Nominee(s)	Result	Ref.
2021	4th Berlanga Awards	Best Actress	Paz Vega	Nominated	
2021	4th Berlanga Awards	Best Actor	Joaquín Climent	Nominated	
2021	4th Berlanga Awards	Best Supporting Actress	Susi Sánchez	Nominated	
2021	4th Berlanga Awards	Best Supporting Actor	Roberto Álamo	Nominated	
2021	4th Berlanga Awards	Best Original Music	Xema Fuertes, Amadeo Moscardó	Nominated	
2021	4th Berlanga Awards	Best Production Supervision	José Jaime Linares	Nominated	
2021	4th Berlanga Awards	Best Editing	Marta Salas	Nominated	
2021	4th Berlanga Awards	Best Cinematography and Lighting	Guillem Oliver	Nominated	
2021	4th Berlanga Awards	Best Sound	Dani Navarro, Iván Martinez Rufat	Nominated	
2021	4th Berlanga Awards	Best Costume Design	Giovanna Ribes	Nominated	

== See also ==
- List of Spanish films of 2021
