= Some Like It Hot =

1959 film

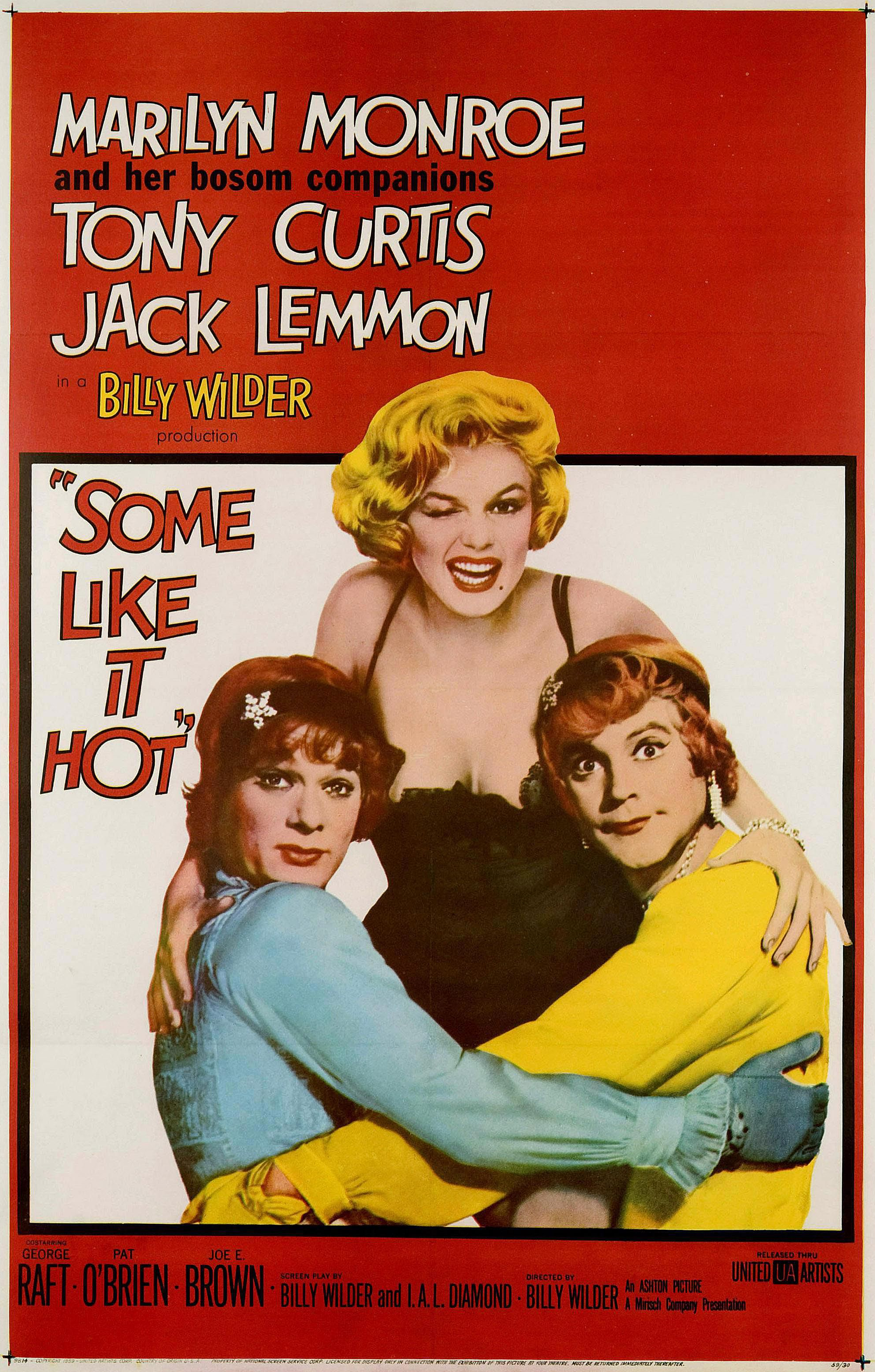
- Theatrical release poster by Macario Gómez Quibus
- Directed by: Billy Wilder
- Screenplay by: Billy Wilder; I. A. L. Diamond
- Story by: Robert Thoeren; Michael Logan
- Based on: Fanfare of Love; 1935 film by Max Bronnet; Michael Logan; Pierre Prévert; René Pujol; Robert Thoeren
- Produced by: Billy Wilder
- Starring: Marilyn Monroe; Tony Curtis; Jack Lemmon; George Raft; Pat O'Brien; Joe E. Brown
- Cinematography: Charles Lang
- Edited by: Arthur P. Schmidt
- Music by: Adolph Deutsch
- Production company: Mirisch Company
- Distributed by: United Artists
- Release date: March 19, 1959
- Running time: 121 minutes
- Country: United States
- Language: English
- Budget: $2.9 million
- Box office: $25 million (North America)

The film's trailer

Some Like It Hot is a 1959 American crime comedy film produced, co-written and directed by Billy Wilder. It stars Marilyn Monroe, Tony Curtis and Jack Lemmon, with George Raft, Pat O'Brien, Joe E. Brown, Joan Shawlee and Nehemiah Persoff in supporting roles. The screenplay by Wilder and I. A. L. Diamond is based on a screenplay by Robert Thoeren and Michael Logan from the 1935 French film Fanfare of Love. Set in the Prohibition era, the film is about two musicians (Curtis and Lemmon) who disguise themselves as women to escape Chicago mobsters they witnessed commit murder.

Some Like It Hot opened to critical and commercial success and is considered to be one of the greatest films ever made. The film received six Academy Award nominations, including Best Actor, Best Director and Best Adapted Screenplay, winning for Best Costume Design. In 1989, the Library of Congress selected it as one of the first 25 films for preservation in the United States National Film Registry for being "culturally, historically, or aesthetically significant".

== Plot ==
In Prohibition-era Chicago, Joe is a jazz saxophone player and an irresponsible, impulsive gambler and ladies' man; Jerry, his anxious friend, is a jazz double bass player. They work in a speakeasy owned by local Mafia boss "Spats" Colombo. Tipped off by informant "Toothpick" Charlie, the police raid the joint. Joe and Jerry escape but accidentally witness Spats and his henchmen gunning down Toothpick and his gang in revenge (an incident inspired by the Saint Valentine's Day Massacre). Spats and his gang see them as they flee. Broke, terrified, and desperate to leave Chicago, Joe and Jerry disguise themselves as women named Josephine and Daphne so they can join Sweet Sue and her Society Syncopators, an all-female band headed to Miami by train. On the train, they befriend Sugar Kane, the band's vocalist and ukulele player.

Joe and Jerry become obsessed with Sugar and compete for her affections while maintaining their disguises. Sugar confides to Joe that she has sworn off (male) saxophone players, who have taken advantage of her in the past. She hopes to find a gentle, bespectacled millionaire in Florida. Joe and Jerry become close friends with Sugar during a late-night party on the train, while struggling to remember that flirting with her would compromise their cover.

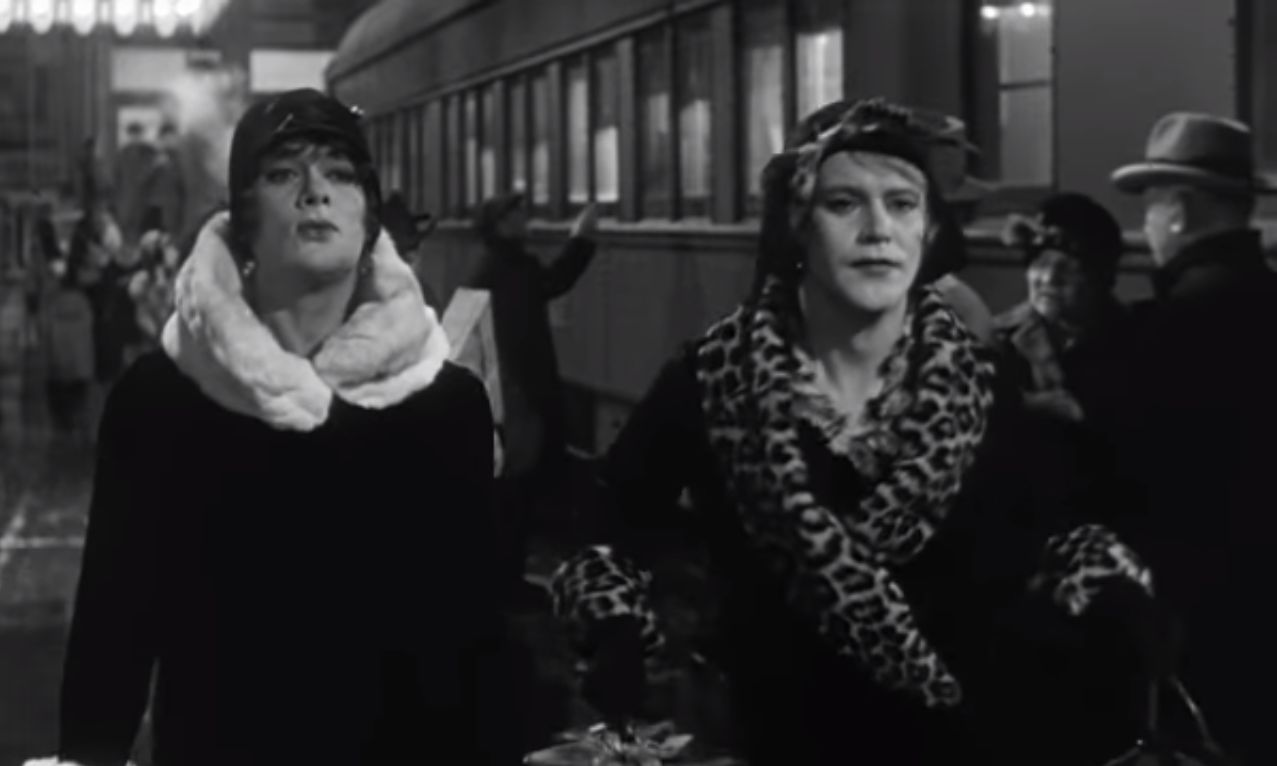
Joe (Curtis) and Jerry (Lemmon) disguise themselves as Josephine and Daphne to evade execution by the mob.

After arriving in Miami, Joe woos Sugar by posing as Junior, heir to the Shell Oil fortune, affecting a Cary Grant-esque accent while feigning indifference to her. Aging, multi-divorced Osgood Fielding III—an actual millionaire—persistently pursues "Daphne" (Jerry), whose refusals only fuel his desire. After Osgood invites Jerry to dinner on his yacht, Joe convinces Jerry to keep Osgood occupied onshore, so Joe can pass the yacht off as his own and entertain Sugar. As Junior, he tells Sugar that psychological trauma from the death of a former lover has left him impotent, but he would immediately marry anyone who could cure him. Sugar tries to arouse him, with considerable success. Meanwhile, Jerry and Osgood tango until dawn. Back at the hotel, Jerry announces that he has accepted Osgood's proposal of marriage, anticipating a divorce and cash settlement when the ruse is revealed. Joe convinces Jerry that he cannot marry Osgood.

The hotel hosts a conference for the Friends of Italian Opera Society, a front for a national Mafia meeting, presided over by Little Bonaparte—who already has a grudge against Spats over the murder of Toothpick. Spats and his men arrive, and this time see through Joe and Jerry's disguises. Fearing for their lives, Joe and Jerry realize they must quit the band and leave the hotel. Joe breaks up with Sugar over the telephone, telling her that he must marry a woman of his father's choosing and move to Venezuela, leaving her heartbroken. In male disguises, Joe and Jerry evade Spats' men by hiding under a table at the syndicate banquet, where Little Bonaparte has Spats and his gang gunned down. Joe and Jerry are spotted as they flee through the hotel. They revert to women's clothing to evade capture. On the way out, Joe, dressed as Josephine, sees Sugar onstage singing a lament to lost love, kisses her, then rejoins Jerry in their flight. Realizing that Josephine and Junior are the same person, Sugar follows them.

Still dressed as Daphne, Jerry persuades Osgood to take him and Joe away on his yacht. Sugar unexpectedly joins them on Osgood's launch just as it leaves the dock. Removing his disguise, Joe confesses to Sugar and tells her that she deserves better, but Sugar wants him anyway, realizing he is the first man to genuinely care for her. Meanwhile, Jerry, as Daphne, tries to get out of his engagement, listing reasons why "she" and Osgood cannot marry—she can't wear his mother's wedding gown because she's "not built the same", is not a natural blonde, smokes, cannot have children, has been living with a saxophone player—none of which bother Osgood. Exasperated, Jerry rips off his wig and says, "I'm a man!" in his normal voice. Still unperturbed and smiling, Osgood replies "Well, nobody's perfect!" leaving Jerry speechless.

== Cast ==
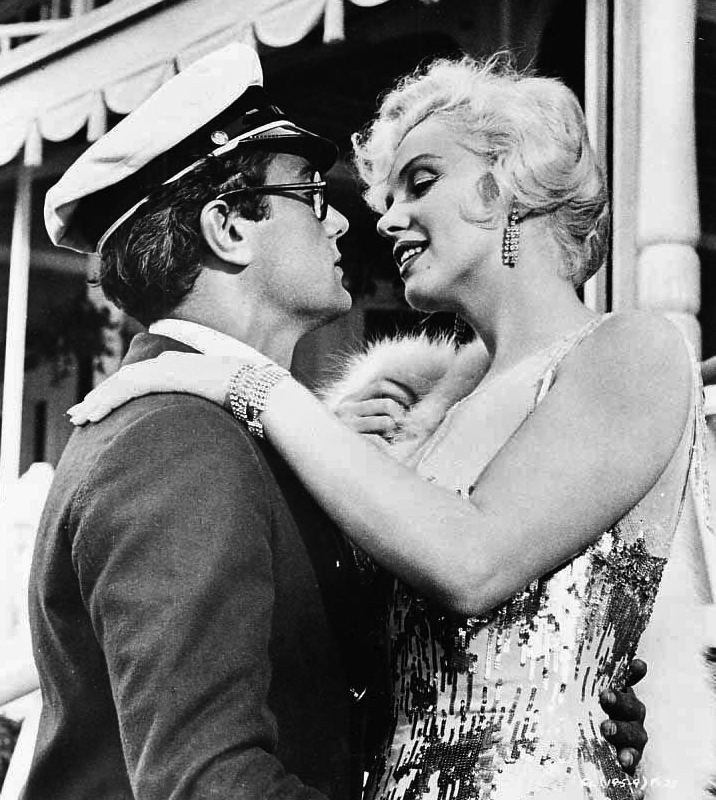
Curtis as "Shell Oil Junior" and Monroe as Sugar

- Tony Curtis as Joe/Josephine/Shell Oil Junior, a saxophone player
- Jack Lemmon as Jerry/Daphne, a bassist
- Marilyn Monroe as Sugar "Kane" Kowalczyk, a ukulele player and singer
- Joe E. Brown as Osgood Fielding III
- George Raft as "Spats" Colombo, a mobster from Chicago
- Pat O'Brien as Agent Mulligan
- Nehemiah Persoff as Little Bonaparte, a mobster and leader of the Friends of Italian Opera Society
- Joan Shawlee as Sweet Sue, the bandleader of Sweet Sue and Her Society Syncopators
- Dave Barry as Mister Bienstock, the band manager for "Sweet Sue and Her Society Syncopators"
- Billy Gray as Sig Poliakoff, Joe and Jerry's agent in Chicago
- Barbara Drew as Nellie Weinmeyer, Poliakoff's secretary
- George E. Stone as "Toothpick" Charlie, a gangster who is killed by "Spats" Colombo
- Mike Mazurki as Spats's henchman
- Harry Wilson as Spats's henchman
- Edward G. Robinson Jr. as Johnny Paradise, a gangster who kills "Spats" Colombo
- Beverly Wills as Dolores, a trombone player, and Sugar's apartment friend
- Grace Lee Whitney as Rosella, band member (uncredited)

== Soundtrack ==
Some Like It Hot: Original MGM Motion Picture Soundtrack

Soundtrack album
- Released: 24 February 1998
- Genres: Soundtrack; Jazz
- Length: 32:22

The soundtrack features four songs performed by Marilyn Monroe, nine songs composed by Adolph Deutsch, and two songs performed by jazz artist Matty Malneck.

No.	Title	Length
1.	"Runnin' Wild" (Marilyn Monroe)	1:07
2.	"Medley: Sugar Blues/Runnin' Wild" (Adolph Deutsch & His Orchestra)	1:32
3.	"Down Among the Sheltering Palms" (Adolph Deutsch & His Orchestra)	1:59
4.	"Randolph Street Rag" (Adolph Deutsch)	1:28
5.	"I Wanna Be Loved by You" (Marilyn Monroe)	2:58
6.	"Park Avenue Fantasy" (Adolph Deutsch & His Orchestra)	3:34
7.	"Medley: Down Among the Sheltering Palms / La Cumparsita / I Wanna Be Loved By You" (Adolph Deutsch & His Orchestra)	2:20
8.	"I'm Thru with Love" (Marilyn Monroe)	2:34
9.	"Medley: Sugar Blues / Tell the Whole Darn World" (Adolph Deutsch & His Orchestra)	3:25
10.	"Play It Again Charlie" (Adolph Deutsch)	1:49
11.	"Sweet Georgia Brown" (Matty Malneck & His Orchestra)	2:57
12.	"By the Beautiful Sea" (Adolph Deutsch & His Orchestra)	1:22
13.	"Park Avenue Fantasy (Reprise)" (Adolph Deutsch & His Orchestra)	2:10
14.	"Some Like It Hot" (Matty Malneck & His Orchestra)	1:46
15.	"Some Like It Hot (Single Version)" (Marilyn Monroe)	1:21
Total length:		32:22

== Production ==
=== Pre-production ===
Billy Wilder wrote the script for the film with writer I. A. L. Diamond. The plot was based on a screenplay by Robert Thoeren and Michael Logan for the 1935 French film Fanfare of Love (Fanfare d'amour). The original script for Fanfare of Love was untraceable, so Walter Mirisch found a copy of the 1951 German remake, Fanfares of Love (Fanfaren der Liebe). He bought the rights to that script, and Wilder worked with this to produce a new story. Both films follow the story of two musicians in search of work, but Wilder created the gangster subplot.

The studio hired female impersonator Barbette to coach Lemmon and Curtis. Monroe worked for 10 percent of the gross in excess of $4 million, Curtis for 5 percent of the gross over $2 million, and Wilder for 17.5 percent of the first million after break-even and 20 percent thereafter.

=== Casting ===
Billy Wilder spotted Tony Curtis while he was making the film Houdini (1953). Wilder thought that Curtis would be perfect for the role of Joe: "I was sure Tony was right for it", said Wilder, "because he was quite handsome, and when he tells Marilyn that he is one of the Shell Oil family, she has to be able to believe it". Wilder's first idea for the role of Jerry was Frank Sinatra, but he later thought that he would be too difficult. Jerry Lewis and Danny Kaye were also considered for the role of Jerry. Lewis was offered the role, but he declined, as he did not want to do drag, a decision that he later would regret. Finally, Wilder saw Lemmon in the comedy Operation Mad Ball and selected him for the part. Wilder and Lemmon would go on to make numerous films together, including The Apartment and several films that also included Walter Matthau.

According to York Film Notes, Wilder and Diamond did not expect a star as big as Marilyn Monroe to take the part of Sugar. "Mitzi Gaynor was who we had in mind", Wilder said. "The word came that Marilyn wanted the part and then we had to have Marilyn." Monroe considered the role of Sugar Kane another "dumb blonde", but she accepted it due to her husband Arthur Miller's encouragement and the offer of 10% of the film's profits on top of her standard pay. Curtis stated that everyone told Wilder not to cast Monroe as she was too difficult to work with. Wilder and Monroe had previously worked together on The Seven Year Itch in 1955.

It was George Raft's first "A" picture in a number of years.

=== Filming ===
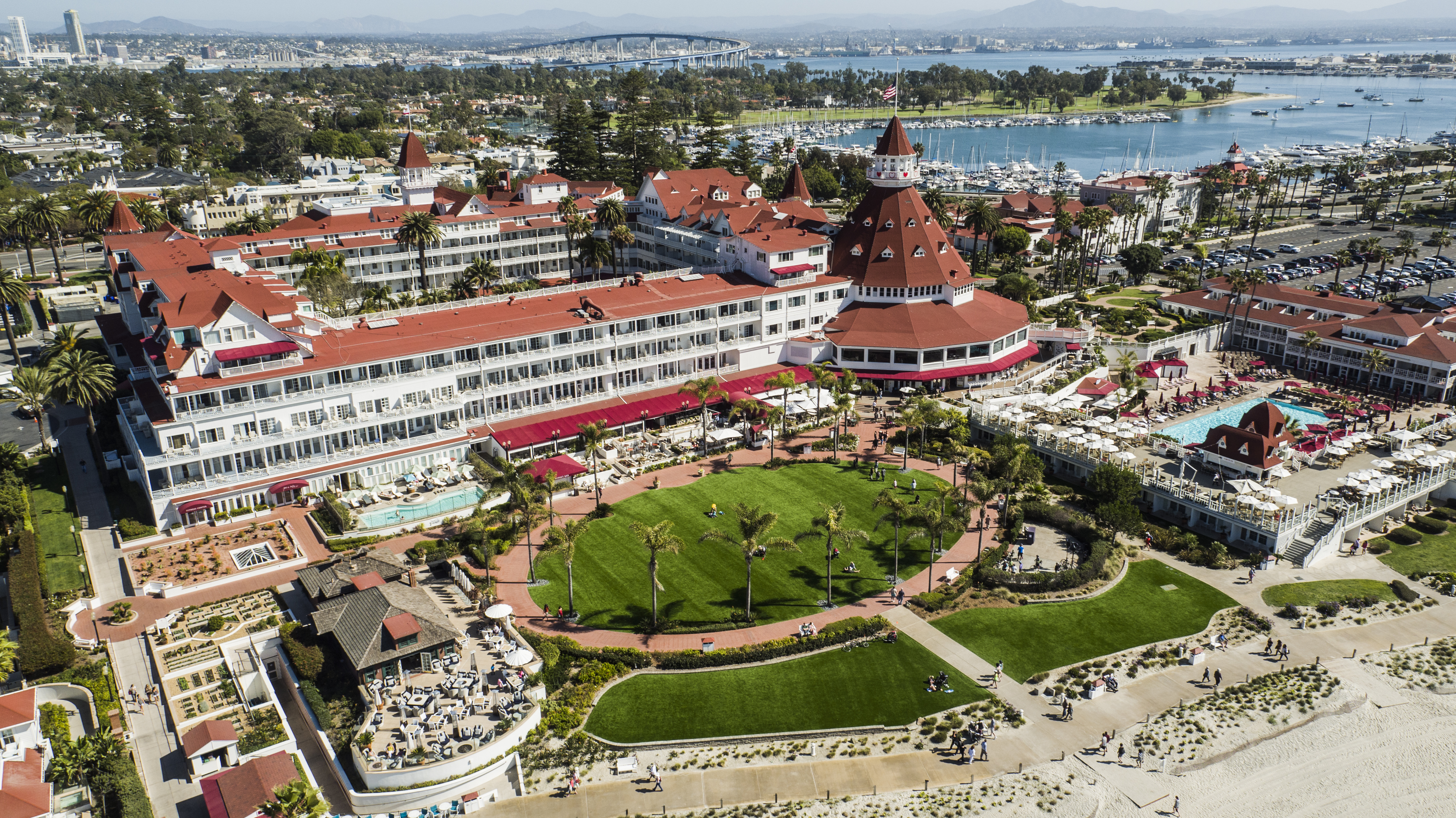
Hotel del Coronado (2016)

The film was made in California during the summer and autumn of 1958. AFI reported the production dates between early August and November 12, 1958, at Samuel Goldwyn Studios. Many scenes were shot at the Hotel del Coronado in Coronado, California, which appeared as the "Seminole Ritz Hotel" in Miami in the film, as it fit into the era of the 1920s and was near Hollywood. The Mirisch Company was the film's presenter, and producer Walter Mirisch employed several crew members from his home base, the Allied Artists studio.

The film's difficult production has since become "legendary". Monroe demanded dozens of retakes, and did not remember her lines or act as directed—Curtis famously said that kissing her was "like kissing Hitler" due to the number of retakes. The line "It's me, Sugar" took 47 takes to get correct because Monroe kept getting the word order wrong, saying either "Sugar, it's me" or "It's Sugar, me". Curtis and Lemmon made bets during the filming on how many takes she would need to get it right. Monroe privately likened the production to a sinking ship and commented on her co-stars and director saying "[but] why should I worry, I have no phallic symbol to lose." Many of the problems stemmed from her and Wilder – who also had a reputation for being difficult – disagreeing on how she should play the role. She angered him by asking to alter many of her scenes, which in turn made her stage fright worse, and it is suggested that she deliberately ruined several scenes to act them her way. Three days were scheduled for shooting the scene with Shell Jr. and Sugar at the beach, as Monroe had many complicated lines, but the scene was finished in only 20 minutes. Monroe's acting coach Paula Strasberg and Monroe's husband Arthur Miller both tried to influence the production, which Wilder and other crew members found annoying. Grace Lee Whitney noted in her autobiography that she and other women in the case were required to dye their hair a darker color because Monroe would not permit any other female cast member to be as blonde as she was.

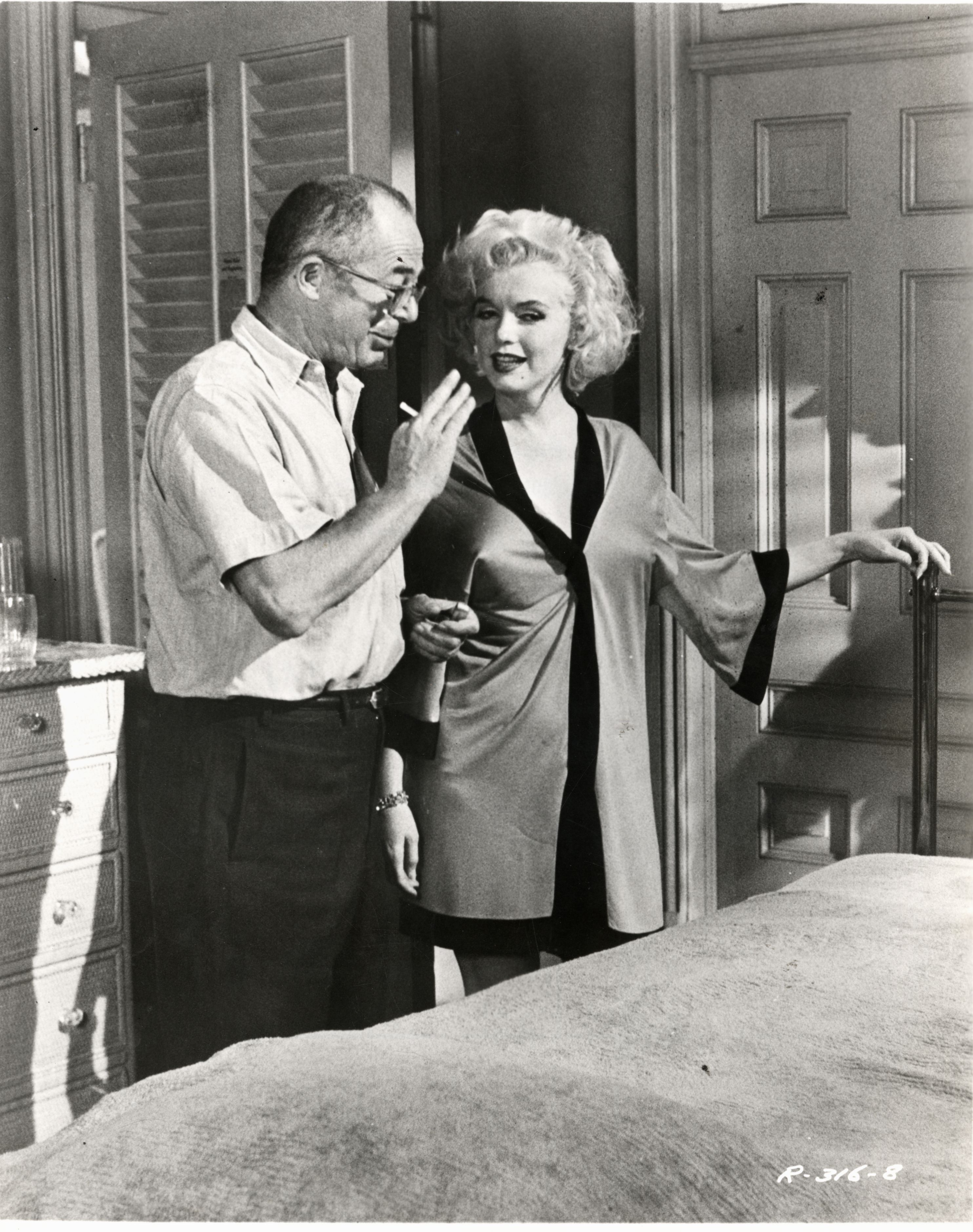
Wilder and Monroe during the filming

Wilder spoke in 1959 about making another film with Monroe: "I have discussed this with my doctor and my psychiatrist and they tell me I'm too old and too rich to go through this again." But Wilder also admitted: "My Aunt Minnie would always be punctual and never hold up production, but who would pay to see my Aunt Minnie?" He also stated that Monroe played her part wonderfully. Years later, Wilder noted "I think there are more books on Marilyn Monroe than there are on World War 2, and there's a great similarity."

The film's closing line, "Well, nobody's perfect", is ranked 78th on The Hollywood Reporter list of Hollywood's 100 Favorite Movie Lines, but it was never supposed to be in the final cut. Diamond and Wilder put it in the script as a "placeholder" until they could come up with something better, but they never did. Wilder's tombstone pays homage to the line by reading, "I'm a writer, but then, nobody's perfect". In 2000, The Guardian ranked the closing scene at No. 10 on their list of "The top 100 film moments".

=== Style ===
With regard to sound design, there is a "strong musical element" in the film, with the soundtrack created by Adolph Deutsch. It has an authentic 1920s jazz feel using sharp, brassy strings to create tension in certain moments, for example whenever Spats's gangsters appear. In terms of cinematography and aesthetics, Wilder chose to shoot the film in black and white as Lemmon and Curtis in full drag costume and make-up looked "unacceptably grotesque" in early color tests. Despite Monroe's contract requiring the film to be in color, she agreed to it being filmed in black and white after seeing that Curtis and Lemmon's makeup gave them a "ghoulish" appearance on color film. Orry-Kelly created the costumes for Monroe as well as Lemmon and Curtis, after the stock costumes the studio provided for the male leads fit poorly.

== Reception ==
=== Box office ===
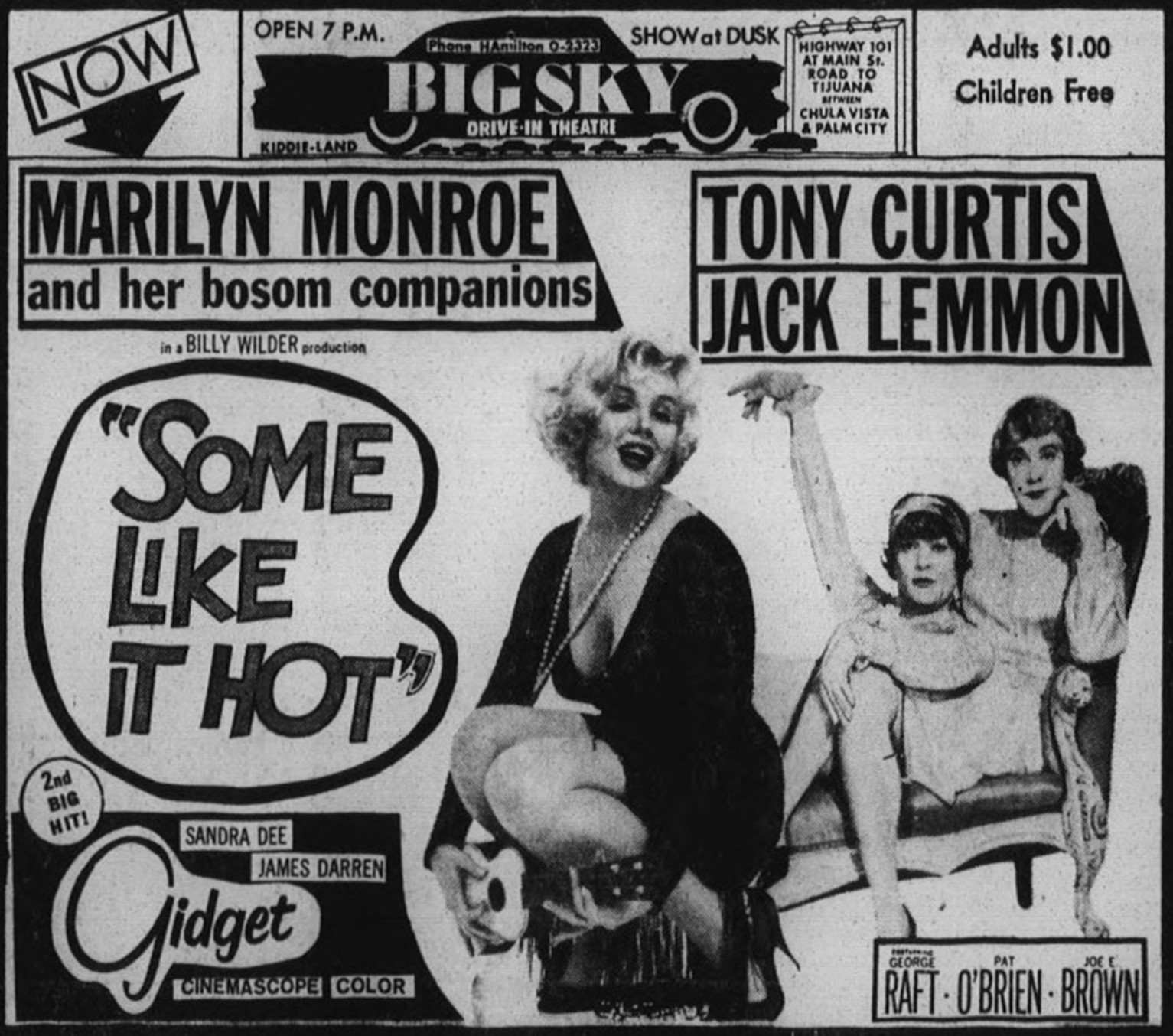
July 2, 1959, newspaper advertisement for a drive-in theater viewing of the film

By 1962, Some Like It Hot had grossed $14 million in the US. According to The Numbers, the film ultimately grossed $25 million domestically. Box Office Mojo reported that its re-releases outside North America had grossed over $83.2 million internationally.

The film opened in the week ended March 24, 1959, in several cities in the United States; the highest grossing of which were in Chicago, where it grossed $45,000 at the United Artists Theatre with Monroe making an appearance, and in Washington, D.C., where it grossed $40,000 at the Capitol Theatre. With results from just six key cities, Variety listed it as the third highest-grossing film in the United States for the week.

The film then expanded to 100 theatres around the country for the Easter holiday, including at the newly renovated State Theatre in New York City on Sunday, March 29, 1959, and became number one in the country and remained there for three weeks before being knocked off the top by Imitation of Life. Imitation of Life was top for two weeks before being replaced again by Some Like It Hot, which remained there for another four weeks before being replaced by Pork Chop Hill. In its first month, the film grossed $2,585,120 from 96 engagements.

=== Retrospective appraisal ===
Some Like It Hot received widespread acclaim from critics and is considered among the best films of all time. On review aggregator Rotten Tomatoes, 95% of 73 critics have given the film a positive review, with an average rating of 9.1/10. The website's critical consensus calls it "a spry, quick-witted farce that never drags." According to Metacritic, another review aggregator which calculated a weighted average score of 98 out of 100 based on 19 critics, the film received "universal acclaim". The Chicago Sun-Times's Roger Ebert wrote: "Wilder's 1959 comedy is one of the enduring treasures of the movies, a film of inspiration and meticulous craft." Ebert gave the film four stars out of four and included it in his Great Movies list. John McCarten of The New Yorker referred to the film as "a jolly, carefree enterprise". Richard Roud, writing for The Guardian in 1967, called it "close to perfection".

The Hays Production Code had been gradually weakening in its scope since the early 1950s, owing to greater social tolerance for taboo topics in film, but it was enforced until the mid-1960s. The overwhelming success of Some Like It Hot is considered one of the reasons behind the retirement of the code.

In 1989, the film became one of the first 25 inducted into the United States National Film Registry. In 1998, the film was ranked at No. 7 in Time Out's poll of Top 100 Films. In 1999, Entertainment Weekly voted it at No. 9 on their list of "100 Greatest Movies of All Time".

Some Like It Hot was voted as the top American comedy film by the American Film Institute on their list on AFI's 100 Years...100 Laughs poll in 2000, and was selected as the best comedy of all time in a poll of 253 film critics from 52 countries conducted by the BBC in 2017. In 2005, the British Film Institute included this film on its list of "Top fifty films for children up to the age of 14". The 2022 Sight & Sound critics' poll ranked it as the 38th greatest film of all time, tied with Rear Window and a bout de souffle. The 2022 Sight & Sound directors' poll ranked it 62nd, tied with nine other films. In the earlier 2012 Sight & Sound polls, it was ranked the 42nd-greatest film ever made in the critics' poll and 37th in the directors' poll. In 2016, the Directors Guild of America ranked the film 50th on its list of The 80 Best-Directed Films since the Guild’s founding in 1936. The 2002 Sight & Sound polls the film ranked 37th among critics and 24th among directors. In 2010, The Guardian considered it the third-best comedy film of all time. In 2015, the film ranked 30th on BBC's "100 Greatest American Films" list, voted on by film critics from around the world. It was included in The New York Times's "The Best 1,000 Movies Ever Made" list in 2002. In 2005, it was included on Time's All-Time 100 best movies list. The film was voted at No. 52 on the list of "100 Greatest Films" by the French film magazine Cahiers du Cinéma in 2008. In July 2018, it was screened in the Venice Classics section at the 75th Venice International Film Festival.

According to film historian Foster Hirsch, during a screening of the film at Grauman's Chinese Theatre in March 1959, "Joe E. Brown's nonchalant delivery of the final line elicited the loudest, deepest, heartiest laughter I have ever heard in a theater...recognizing a perfectly timed one-liner for the ages, a thousand spectators roared in unified delight."

=== Awards and nominations ===
Award	Category	Nominee(s)	Result	Ref.
Academy Awards	Best Director	Billy Wilder	Nominated	
Academy Awards	Best Actor	Jack Lemmon	Nominated	
Academy Awards	Best Screenplay – Based on Material from Another Medium	Billy Wilder and I. A. L. Diamond	Nominated	
Academy Awards	Best Art Direction – Black-and-White	Art Direction: Ted Haworth; Set Decoration: Edward G. Boyle	Nominated	
Academy Awards	Best Cinematography – Black-and-White	Charles Lang	Nominated	
Academy Awards	Best Costume Design – Black-and-White	Orry-Kelly	Won	
Bambi Awards	Best Actor – International	Tony Curtis	Nominated	
British Academy Film Awards	Best Film from any Source	Billy Wilder	Nominated	
British Academy Film Awards	Best Foreign Actor	Jack Lemmon	Won	
Directors Guild of America Awards	Outstanding Directorial Achievement in Motion Pictures	Billy Wilder	Nominated	
Golden Globe Awards	Best Motion Picture – Musical or Comedy		Won	
Golden Globe Awards	Best Actor in a Motion Picture – Musical or Comedy	Jack Lemmon	Won	
Golden Globe Awards	Best Actress in a Motion Picture – Musical or Comedy	Marilyn Monroe	Won	
Grammy Awards	Best Sound Track Album, Original Cast – Motion Picture or Television	Some Like It Hot	Nominated	
Jules Verne Awards	Jules Verne Légendaire Award	Billy Wilder	Won	
Laurel Awards	Top Comedy		3rd Place	
Laurel Awards	Top Male Comedy Performance	Jack Lemmon	2nd Place	
Laurel Awards	Top Female Comedy Performance	Marilyn Monroe	2nd Place	
National Board of Review Awards	Top Ten Films		7th Place	
National Film Preservation Board	National Film Registry		Inducted	
Online Film & Television Association Awards	Hall of Fame – Motion Picture		Inducted	
Producers Guild of America Awards	PGA Hall of Fame – Motion Pictures	Robert Evans	Won	
Venice International Film Festival	Golden Lion	Billy Wilder	Nominated	
Writers Guild of America Awards	Best Written American Comedy	Billy Wilder and I. A. L. Diamond	Won	

The film is recognized by American Film Institute in these lists:

- 1998: AFI's 100 Years...100 Movies – No. 14
- 2000: AFI's 100 Years...100 Laughs – No. 1
- 2005: AFI's 100 Years...100 Movie Quotes:
  - Osgood Fielding III: "Well, nobody's perfect." – No. 48
- 2007: AFI's 100 Years...100 Movies (10th Anniversary Edition) – No. 22

The film was inducted in 1989 into the National Film Registry by the Library of Congress. In 2006, the Writers Guild of America ranked the film's screenplay the ninth greatest ever written.

== Adaptations ==
An unsold television pilot based on the film was produced in 1961, starring Vic Damone as Joe, Dick Patterson as Jerry and Tina Louise as Candy Collins. Tony Curtis and Jack Lemmon made cameo appearances in the opening scene, reprising their respective roles as Joe and Jerry. In the pilot, the characters undergo plastic surgery to disguise themselves while continuing to flee gangsters, after which Joe and Jerry are portrayed by Damone and Patterson, respectively. Curtis and Lemmon reportedly agreed to appear as a favor to producer Walter Mirisch.

In 1975, a Bollywood remake was released as Rafoo Chakkar.

A 1984 stage production at the Claridge Hotel & Casino in Atlantic City, New Jersey, starred Joe Namath as Joe.

A 1991 stage production of this show in London featured Tommy Steele and retained the film's title.

Tony Curtis, then in his late 70s, performed in a 2002 stage production of the film, this time cast as Osgood Fielding III, the character originally played by Joe E. Brown.

=== Broadway ===
The 1972 musical Sugar, based on the film screenplay, opened on Broadway starring Elaine Joyce, Robert Morse, Tony Roberts, and Cyril Ritchard, with book by Peter Stone, lyrics by Bob Merrill, and (all-new) music by Jule Styne.

On January 5, 2019, Marc Shaiman and Scott Wittman confirmed they were writing the music and lyrics for a new adaptation in an interview with Graham Norton on BBC Radio 2. The version had aimed for a Broadway production in 2020, but was delayed by the COVID-19 pandemic. On April 20, 2022, the production was confirmed to star Christian Borle at the Shubert Theatre with previews beginning November 1, 2022, with music by Shaiman, music and lyrics by Shaiman and Wittman, and book by Matthew Lopez and Amber Ruffin. The Broadway production went on to win four Tony Awards at the 76th annual ceremony in 2023: Casey Nicholaw for Best Choreography, Charlie Rosen & Bryan Carter for Best Orchestrations, Gregg Barnes for Best Costume Design of a Musical, and J. Harrison Ghee for Best Leading Actor in a Musical. Ghee was the first openly non-binary actor to be both nominated for and to win a Tony Award, along with Alex Newell, who won for their role in Shucked.

== See also ==
- Cross-dressing in film and television
- List of American films of 1959
- List of cult films
- List of films considered the best

== Sources ==
- Banner, Lois (2012). Marilyn: The Passion and the Paradox. Bloomsbury. ISBN 978-1-4088-3133-5.
- Churchwell, Sarah (2004). The Many Lives of Marilyn Monroe. Granta Books. ISBN 978-0-312-42565-4.
- Hirsch, Foster. 2023. Hollywood and the Movies of the Fifties. Alfred A. Knopf, New York. ISBN 978-0307958921
- Rose, Jacqueline (2014). Women in Dark Times. Bloomsbury. ISBN 978-1-4088-4540-0.
- Spoto, Donald (2001). Marilyn Monroe: The Biography. Cooper Square Press. ISBN 978-0-8154-1183-3.
