= Azahar =

Azahar may refer to:

== Names ==
- Azahar Uddin Ahmed (1913–2011), Bangladeshi politician and physician
- Noor Azhar Hamid (born 1949), Singaporean high jumper
- Azahar Mohamed (born 1956), Malaysian judge and lawyer
- Shah Azahar Abdullah Ahar (born 1983), Bruneian footballer
- Amer Azahar (born 1995), Malaysian footballer

== Other ==
- Azahar (emulator), a Nintendo 3DS emulator
- Azahar Mosque, a mosque in Chanthabuly, Vientiane, Laos
- Costa del Azahar, the coast of the Province of Castellón, Valencia, Spain
- Virgin of Azahar, an invocation of Mary
