= Macario Gómez Quibus =

Spanish film poster artist and designer (1926–2018)

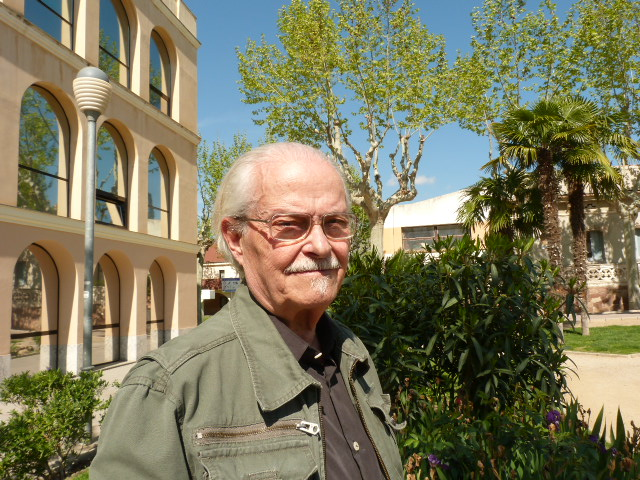
- Macario Gómez Quibus in 2014
- Born: March 8, 1926; Reus, Spain
- Died: July 20, 2018 (aged 92); Olesa de Montserrat, Spain
- Education: Escuela de Bellas Artes de Barcelona
- Known for: Film poster design
- Awards: Creu de Sant Jordi (2014)

Signature
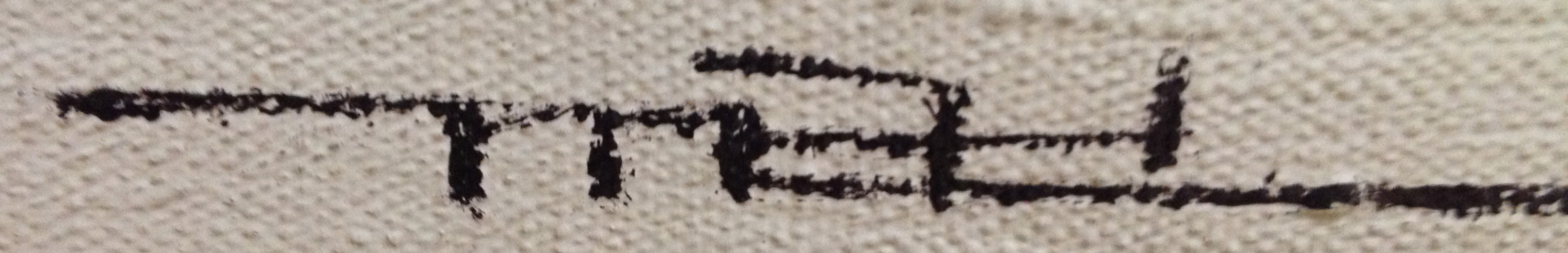

Macario Gómez Quibus, known by the professional nickname of Mac (8 March 1926 – 20 July 2018), was a Spanish film poster artist and designer known for his work for some of Hollywood's best known films of the 20th Century. Some of his most prominent work includes the film posters for Doctor Zhivago (1965), For a Few Dollars More (1965), The Ten Commandments (1956), Some Like It Hot (1959), Psycho (1960), La gran familia (1962), and Dr. No (1962).

Gómez was named an honorary member of the Catalan Film Academy in 2013. In 2014, he was awarded the Creu de Sant Jordi by the Generalitat de Catalunya for his artistic contributions to film.

Macario Gómez Quibus died in Olesa de Montserrat, Spain, on 20 July 2018, at the age of 92.
