= El Pobo de Dueñas =

El Pobo de Dueñas, Spain
- Location within Province of Guadalajara Location within Castilla-La Mancha Location within Spain
- Coordinates: 40°46′43″N 1°38′46″W
- Country: Spain
- Autonomous community: Castile-La Mancha
- Province: Guadalajara
- Municipality: El Pobo de Dueñas

Area
  - Total: 55 km^{2} (21 sq mi)

Population (2025-01-01)
  - Total: 102
  - Density: 1.9/km^{2} (4.8/sq mi)
- Time zone: UTC+1 (CET)
  - Summer (DST): UTC+2 (CEST)

El Pobo de Dueñas is a municipality located in the province of Guadalajara, Castile-La Mancha, Spain. According to the 2004 census (INE), the municipality has a population of 150 inhabitants.
