= Pepe Mediavilla =

Spanish voice actor (1940–2018)

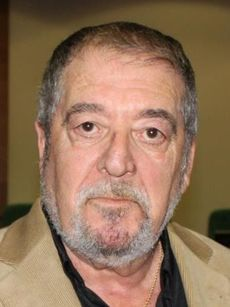
- Mediavilla in 2018
- Born: José Fernández Mediavilla; 23 April 1940; Barcelona, Spain
- Died: 19 April 2018 (aged 77)
- Education: Institut del Teatre
- Occupations: Voice actor; voice director
- Children: Nuria Mediavilla; José Luis Mediavilla

José "Pepe" Fernández Mediavilla (23 April 1940 – 19 April 2018), was a Spanish voice actor and voice director.

== Biography ==
He was born on 23 April 1940 in Barcelona. After studying at the Institut del Teatre in Barcelona, together with Alberto Trifol, Javier Dotú, Ana María Simón, Claudi García and Enric Arredondo among others, in the mid-1960s he started working at the La Voz de España dubbing studio, where José Luis Sansalvador gave his first important role in the dubbing of The Dirty Dozen, dubbing Jim Brown. Also in that decade he gave voice to the charismatic character Spock of the series Star Trek: The Original Series.

After almost 20 years dubbing secondary characters, thanks to the television series could be made with leading roles, highlighting his series dubbed as Extraños, Coraje (both in 1985), Loco de remate (1989) and The passion of Gabriel (1991).

From the 1990s, Mediavilla acquired a great popularity in the middle thanks to becoming the most common dubber in Madrid and Barcelona of the actor Morgan Freeman and the role of wizard Gandalf in the film trilogy of The Lord of the Rings. His serious voice is also requested in the world of advertising for spots and radio spots. One of his most prominent roles in animation is the dubbing of one of the characters in the Inspector Gadget series, Dr. Gang. His voice has also featured in sequels such as Gadget & the Gadgetinis. In 2006, he made the narration of the program of TVE El coro de la cárcel. He put the voice of Bernard Fox in Titanic in his rol as Archibald Gracie IV, and in The Mummy, in the rol of Captain Winston Havlock. he has also dubbed such as Tony Burton in Rocky films, George Kennedy, DeForest Kelley and John Goodman, among others.

His daughter Nuria Mediavilla and son José Luis Mediavilla are also dubbing actors.

In early February 2013, Mediavilla started a project linking poetry and music with Joe Atlan, through the YouTube platform.

He was the voice of the narrative of the videogames Sacred, Sacred Underworld, Fallout 3, Fallout: New Vegas and Candle.

He died on 19 April 2018, aged 77, from cardiovascular disease.

== Number of dubbing of best-known actors ==
- Regular voice of Morgan Freeman (in 54 films).
- Regular voice of James Earl Jones (in 18 films).
- Regular voice of Ian McKellen (in 16 movies).
- Regular voice of Philip Baker Hall (in 14 films).
- Regular voice of Victor Argo (in 11 movies).
