= Yuli: The Carlos Acosta Story =

Cuban 2018 ballet biopic

- Film poster
- Spanish: Yuli
- Directed by: Icíar Bollaín
- Written by: Paul Laverty
- Based on: No Way Home by Carlos Acosta
- Produced by: Andrea Calderwood
- Starring: Carlos Acosta; Santiago Alfonso; Keyvin Martínez; Edilson Manuel Olbera Núñez; Laura de la Uz; Yerlín Pérez
- Cinematography: Alex Catalán
- Edited by: Nacho Ruiz Capillas
- Music by: Alberto Iglesias
- Production companies: The Match Factory; BBC Films; Creative Scotland; Morena Films; Potboiler Productions
- Distributed by: Modern Films
- Release dates: 23 September 2018 (San Sebastián); 14 December 2018 (Spain)
- Running time: 115 minutes
- Countries: Spain; Cuba; United Kingdom; Germany
- Languages: Spanish; English

Yuli: The Carlos Acosta Story is a 2018 dance biopic about the Cuban ballet director and dancer Carlos Acosta; based on his biography and starring Acosta as the adult version of himself, it was directed by Icíar Bollaín.

== Synopsis ==
Carlos Acosta, an Afro-Cuban boy growing up in Havana, is nicknamed Yuli by his father, who is proud of his heritage — the name is drawn from Santería beliefs. He is a talented dancer and is enrolled in a prestigious ballet school by his parents, who are divorced. The film shows his development from a boy who worries that ballet is "effeminate", to becoming one of the world's greatest performers and directors, and a pioneer among Black dancers.

== Release ==
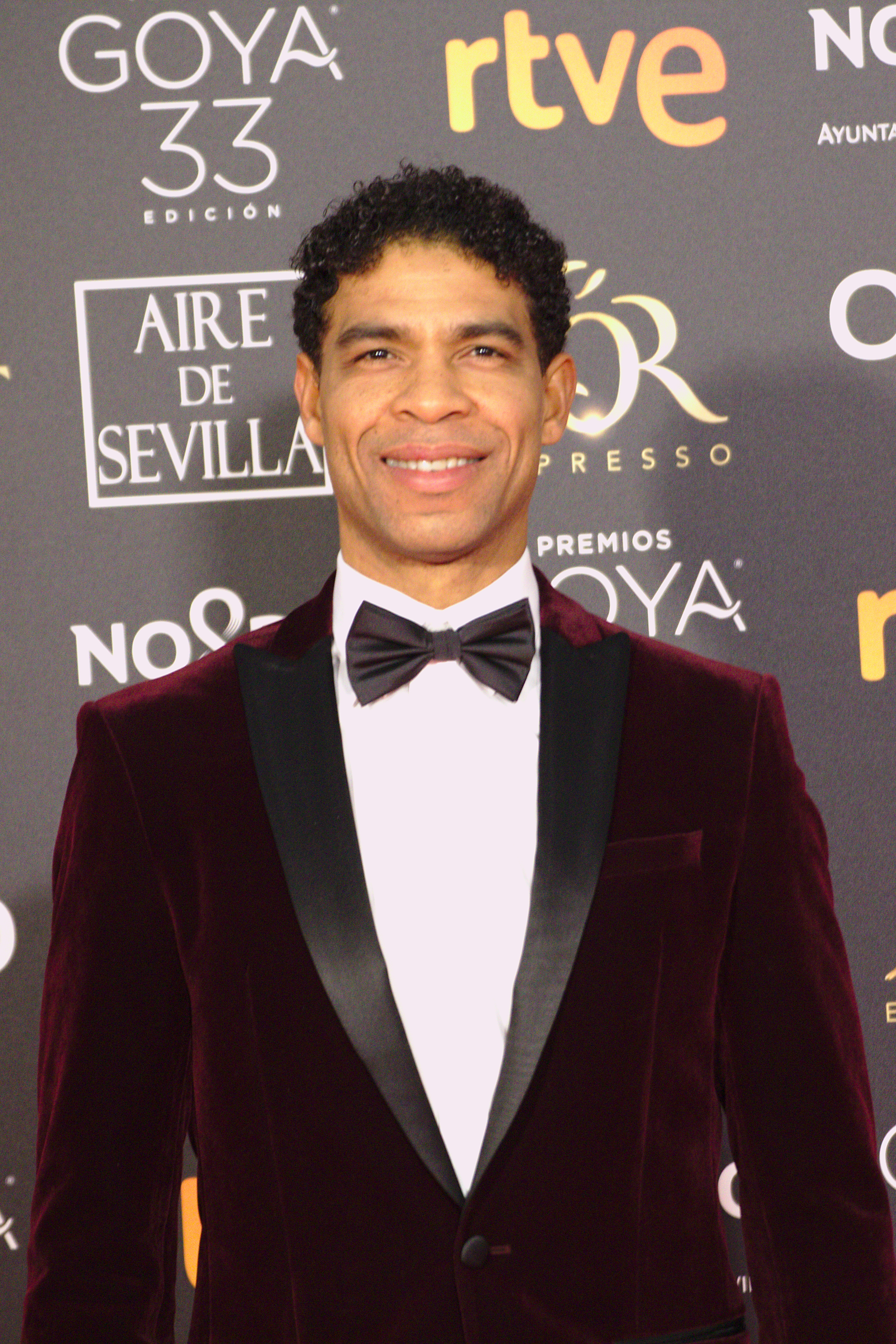
Carlos Acosta at the 2019 Goya Awards.

The film premiered at the 66th San Sebastián International Film Festival on 23 September 2018.

Yuli received very positive reviews, scoring 93% (from 27 reviews) on Rotten Tomatoes. The Guardian gave it three stars out of five, calling Yuli "energetic, emotionally reflective" and praising the dance sequences and Edlison Manuel Olbera Núñez's performance as young Acosta, but criticising some "clunky" dialogue.

Acosta was nominated for the Goya Award for Best New Actor at the 33rd Goya Awards. Eva Valiño, Pelayo Gutiérrez and Alberto Ovejero were nominated for Best Sound, Paul Laverty for Best Adapted Screenplay, Alex Catalán for Best Cinematography and Alberto Iglesias for Best Original Score. Iglesias won a Platino Award at the 6th Platino Awards for best score. At the British Independent Film Awards 2019, Edlison Manuel Olbera Núñez was nominated for a BIFA for Best Supporting Actor.
