= Journey to a Mother's Room =

- Theatrical release poster
- Spanish: Viaje al cuarto de una madre
- Directed by: Celia Rico Clavellino
- Written by: Celia Rico Clavellino
- Produced by: Josep Amorós; Ibon Cormenzana
- Starring: Lola Dueñas; Anna Castillo
- Cinematography: Santiago Racaj
- Edited by: Fernando Franco
- Music by: Paco Ortega
- Production companies: Amorós Producciones; Arcadia Motion Pictures; Pecado Films; Sisifo Films; Noodles Production
- Distributed by: Alfa Pictures
- Release dates: 24 September 2018 (SSIFF); 5 October 2018 (Spain)
- Running time: 90 minutes
- Countries: Spain; France
- Languages: Spanish; English

Journey to a Mother's Room (Spanish: Viaje al cuarto de una madre) is a 2018 Spanish-French drama film written and directed by Celia Rico Clavellino, starring Lola Dueñas and Anna Castillo.

The film was nominated for four Goya Awards. At the 6th Feroz Awards, the film won Best Supporting Actress for Castillo from a total of four nominations.

== Cast ==
- Lola Dueñas as Estrella
- Anna Castillo as Leonor
- Noemí Hopper as Andrea
- Ana Mena as Bea
- Susana Abaitua as Laura
- Marisol Membrillo as Águeda
- Pedro Casablanc as Miguel
- Silvia Casanova as Rosa
- Adelfa Calvo as Pili

== Production ==
The film was produced by Amorós Producciones and Arcadia Motion Pictures alongside Pecado Films, Sisifo Films and Noodles Production, and it had the participation of RTVE, Canal Sur and Movistar+.

== Reception ==
Journey to a Mother's Room received positive reviews from film critics. It holds a 100% approval rating on review aggregator website Rotten Tomatoes based on 12 reviews, with an average rating of 7.8/10.

== Awards ==
Awards	Category	Nominated	Result
Goya Awards	Best New Director	Celia Rico Clavellino	Nominated
Goya Awards	Best Actress	Lola Dueñas	Nominated
Goya Awards	Best Supporting Actress	Anna Castillo	Nominated
Goya Awards	Best Editing	Fernando Franco	Nominated
Feroz Awards	Best Drama Film		Nominated
Feroz Awards	Best Screenplay	Celia Rico Clavellino	Nominated
Feroz Awards	Best Actress	Lola Dueñas	Nominated
Feroz Awards	Best Supporting Actress	Anna Castillo	Won
Gaudí Awards	Audience Award		Won
Gaudí Awards	Best Supporting Actress	Anna Castillo	Won
Gaudí Awards	Best Script	Celia Rico Clavellino	Won
Gaudí Awards	Best Actress	Lola Dueñas	Won

== See also ==
- List of Spanish films of 2018
