= Alex Catalán =

Spanish cinematographer

- Born: Alejandro Catalán; 11 December 1968 (age 56); El Pobo de Dueñas, Guadalajara; Spain
- Occupation: director of photography

Alejandro Catalán (11 December 1968 in El Pobo de Dueñas, Spain – present) better known as Alex Catalán, is a Spanish director of photography, who has worked in more than 20 feature films and other short films which have won several prizes.

== Biography ==
One of his first jobs related with the audiovisual sector was when her sister, who was a 1st. Camera Assistant, gave him the opportunity of working as a Clapper/Loader in a commercial for the Spanish National Organization for the blind (ONCE) at the Puerta del Sol of Madrid in the mid – 80s. There he found out the intensity of the professional filming. He also started working as press photographer.

Although he matriculated at biology at the Universidad de Sevilla, he was more attracted by the photography. But not only photography, he also has always loved scuba diving. He attended the schools from Madrid, London, Los Angeles and Cuba and after passing the public examination, he started working as a camera operator in the public Spanish television (TVE) in Seville, where he worked for 12 years. After leaving these public organism he has photographed more than 30 short films and creative documentaries which have won many national and international festivals since 2000.

His interest with the word of the films. He has worked as a director of photography in more than 20 feature films. In 2014 he received the Special Jury Prize on the San Sebastián International Film Festival for Marshland and in 2015 he won the Goya prize for Best Photography Direction for the same film, where the created atmosphere in the marsh of the Guadalquivir was distinguished.

== Awards ==
- 5 Teo Escamilla Awards for the best technical and artistical contribution in 2001, 2010, 2011, 2014 and 2015 given by the Asotiation of Cinematographic Writers from Andalucía.
- Best photography for "Camino" in the 24 edition of the International Film Festival from Guadalajara, Mexico.
- Nominated to the Goya awards in 2010, 2013 and 2019 for the best photography in After, Grupo 7 and Yuli: The Carlos Acosta Story.
- 2 medals from the Cinematographic Writers Circle (CEC) for the best photography in Even the Rain and Marshland.
- Special mention from the jury to the photography in the Tribeca Festival, New York, for Grupo 7.
- Jury award on the 62nd San Sebastian Festival to beste photography for Marshland.
- Goya award to the best photography for Marshland.

== Filmography ==
- 2018 Yuli: The Carlos Acosta Story
- 2014 Marshland
- 2014 Anochece en la India
- 2013 ¿Quién mató a Bambi?
- 2013 No tiene gracia (short film)
- 2012 Grupo 7
- 2011 La voz dormida
- 2011 No tengas miedo
- 2011 Tres (short film)
- 2010 Even the Rain
- 2010 Habitación en Roma
- 2009 After
- 2009 Desátate (TV)
- 2009 La sirena y el buzo (Documentary)
- 2008 Bajo el mismo cielo (TV)
- 2008 Camino
- 2007 Dame veneno (Documentary)
- 2006 Cabeza de perro
- 2006 Cielo sin ángeles (short film)
- 2006 Tocata y fuga (short film)
- 2005 7 vírgenes
- 2004 Necesidades (short film)
- 2004 Atún y chocolate
- 2004 Mirados (short film)
- 2003 Nieves (short film)
- 2003 Queda demostrado (short film)
- 2003 Ulises (short film)
- 2003 Astronautas
- 2003 Underground, la ciudad del Arco Iris (Documentary)
- 2003 La nariz de Cleopatra (short film)
- 2003 Eres mi héroe
- 2002 Asalto informático (TV)
- 2002 Mayte y las nubes (short film)
- 2002 Por dónde rayos sale el sol (short film)
- 2002 El traje
- 2002 María la Portuguesa (TV)
- 2001 Muerte y resurrección (short film)
- 2001 Diminutos del calvario (short film)
- 2000 Invasión Travesti
- 2000 Los Almendros – Plaza nueva (short film)
- 2000 El congreso (Short film)
