= Carmen & Lola =

- Film poster
- Original title: Carmen y Lola
- Directed by: Arantxa Echevarría
- Screenplay by: Arantxa Echevarría
- Produced by: Eduardo Santana
- Starring: Zaira Romero; Rosy Rodríguez; Moreno Borja; Rafaela León; Carolina Yuste
- Cinematography: Pilar Sánchez Díaz
- Edited by: Renato Sanjuán
- Music by: Nina Aranda
- Production company: Tvtec Servicios audiovisuales
- Distributed by: Super8
- Release dates: 15 May 2018 (Cannes); 7 September 2018 (Spain)
- Country: Spain
- Language: Spanish

Carmen & Lola (Spanish: Carmen y Lola) is a 2018 Spanish drama film directed by Arantxa Echevarría which stars Zaira Romero and Rosy Rodríguez alongside Moreno Borja, Rafaela León and Carolina Yuste. It was selected to screen in the Directors' Fortnight section at the 2018 Cannes Film Festival.

== Plot ==
Carmen lives in a Romani community in the suburbs of Madrid. Like every other woman she has ever met, she is destined to live a life that is repeated generation after generation: getting married and raising as many children as possible. But one day she meets Lola, an uncommon Romani woman who dreams about going to university and draws bird graffiti. Carmen quickly develops an understanding with Lola who's shy, independent and likes girls. They discover a world that, inevitably, leads them to be rejected by their families.

== Cast ==
- Zaira Romero as Lola
- Rosy Rodríguez as Carmen
- Moreno Borja as Paco
- Rafaela León as Flor
- Carolina Yuste as Paqui

== Production ==
The film was produced by TVTEC Servicios Audiovisuales with the support of Orange España, the Madrid regional administration and ICAA.

== Release ==
Selected to screen in the Directors' Fortnight independent section of the 71st Cannes Film Festival, the film premiered on 15 May 2018. Distributed by Super 8 Distribución, it opened in Spanish theatres on 7 September 2018.

== Reception ==
On review aggregator Rotten Tomatoes, the film holds an approval rating of 90%, based on 21 reviews, with an average rating of 6.8/10.

== Accolades ==
Year	Award	Category	Nominee(s)	Result	Ref.
2018	23rd Toulouse Spanish Film Festival	Golden Violet		Won	
2019	6th Feroz Awards	Best Drama Film		Nominated	
2019	6th Feroz Awards	Best Director	Arancha Echevarría	Nominated	
2019	6th Feroz Awards	Best Screenplay	Arancha Echevarría	Nominated	
2019	6th Feroz Awards	Best Trailer	Pedro Jiménez	Nominated	
2019	33rd Goya Awards	Best Film		Nominated	
2019	33rd Goya Awards	Best New Director	Arancha Echevarría	Won	
2019	33rd Goya Awards	Best Original Screenplay	Arancha Echevarría	Nominated	
2019	33rd Goya Awards	Best Supporting Actress	Carolina Yuste	Won	
2019	33rd Goya Awards	Best New Actress	Rosy Rodríguez	Nominated	
2019	33rd Goya Awards	Best New Actress	Zaira Moreno	Nominated	
2019	33rd Goya Awards	Best New Actor	Moreno Borja	Nominated	
2019	33rd Goya Awards	Best Original Song	"Me vas a extrañar" by Paco de la Rosa	Nominated	
2019	28th Actors and Actresses Union Awards	Best Film Actress in a Secondary Role	Carolina Yuste	Nominated	
2019	28th Actors and Actresses Union Awards	Best New Actress	Zaira Romero	Nominated	

== See also ==
- List of Spanish films of 2018
