= Zaira Romero =

Spanish actress

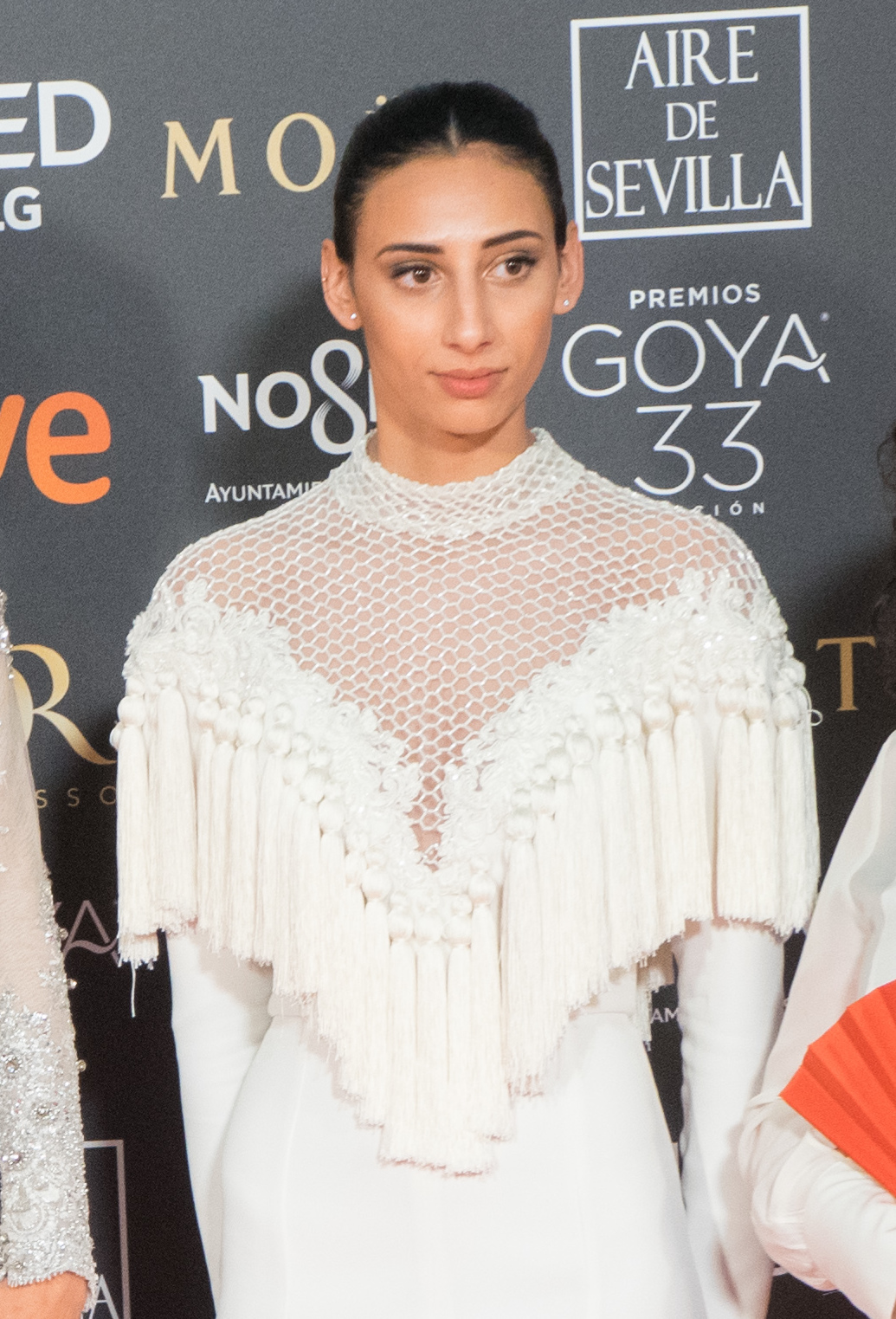
- At the 33rd Goya Awards in 2019
- Born: Zaira Morales Romero; 1999 (age 25–26); Madrid, Spain
- Occupation: Actress
- Years active: 2018–present

Zaira Romero (born 1999) is a Spanish actress, best known for her role in 2018 drama film Carmen & Lola.

== Filmography ==
=== Film ===
Year	Title	Original title	Role	Notes
2018	Carmen & Lola	Carmen y Lola	Lola	Nominated - Goya Award for Best New Actress
2019	The Silence of the Marsh	El Silencio del pantano	Sara	

=== Television ===
Year	Title	Original title	Role	Notes
2020	Disappeared	Desaparecidos	Zahira	Episode: "Lo que parece"
2022	The Gypsy Bride	La novia gitana	Susana Macaya	8 episodes
