= List of films about the Colombian conflict =

Below is an incomplete list of feature films, television films or television series which include events of the Colombian conflict. This list does not include documentaries, short films. This list does not include films about La Violencia.

== 1980s ==
Year	Country	Main title (Alternative title)	Original title (Original script)	Director	Subject
1980	Colombia		Área maldita	Jairo Pinilla	Drama, Thriller.
1986	United States; Mexico	Let's Get Harry		Stuart Rosenberg	Action, Adventure.
1986	Colombia		Pisingaña	Leopoldo Pinzón	Drama.
1987	Italy; Mexico; United States	Hotel Colonial		Cinzia Th. Torrini	Adventure, Drama.
1989	United Kingdom; United States; Mexico	Licence to Kill		John Glen	Action, Adventure, Thriller.

== 1990s ==
Year	Country	Main title (Alternative title)	Original title (Original script)	Director	Subject
1990	United States	Delta Force 2: The Colombian Connection		Aaron Norris	Action, Adventure, Crime, Thriller.
1990	United States	Fire Birds		David Green	Action, Adventure.
1990	Colombia	Rodrigo D: No Future	Rodrigo D: no futuro	Víctor Gaviria	Crime, Drama, Music.
1991	United States	Toy Soldiers		Daniel Petrie Jr.	Action, Drama, Thriller.
1994	United States; Canada	Clear and Present Danger		Phillip Noyce	Action, Crime, Drama, Thriller. Based on the novel Clear and Present Danger. CIA activities in Colombia
1998	Colombia; Italy; Spain	Time Out	Golpe de estadio	Sergio Cabrera	Comedy, Romance, Sport. 1994 FIFA World Cup qualification (CONMEBOL)
1998	Colombia	The Rose Seller	La vendedora de rosas	Víctor Gaviria	Drama. Based on the fairy tale The Little Match Girl.
1998	United States; South Africa	Operation Delta Force 3: Clear Target		Mark Roper	Action.

== 2000s ==
Year	Country	Main title (Alternative title)	Original title (Original script)	Director	Subject
2000	United States	Proof of Life		Taylor Hackford	Action, Drama, Thriller. Based on the article Adventures in the Ransom Trade and the book Long March to Freedom.
2000	Spain; France; Colombia	Our Lady of the Assassins	La virgen de los sicarios	Barbet Schroeder	Crime, Drama. Based on the novel Our Lady of the Assassins.
2000	Colombia; Mexico; Venezuela	The embassy takeover	La toma de la embajada	Ciro Durán	Crime, Drama. 1980 Dominican Republic Embassy siege in Bogotá
2001	United States	Blow		Ted Demme	Biography, Crime, Drama. Based on the book Blow: How a Small Town Boy Made $100 Million with the Medellín Cocaine Cartel and Lost It All. George Jung, Pablo Escobar, Carlos Lehder, Medellín Cartel
2002	United States; Mexico	Collateral Damage		Andrew Davis	Action, Drama, Thriller.
2003	Colombia	The First Night	La primera noche	Luis Alberto Restrepo	Drama.
2004	United States; Colombia; Ecuador	Maria Full of Grace	María, llena eres de gracia	Joshua Marston	Crime, Drama.
2004	Colombia; Spain	Additions and Subtractions	Sumas y restas	Víctor Gaviria	Drama.
2004	Colombia; France; Spain	El Rey		Antonio Dorado	Action, Drama.
2004	Colombia	Wandering Shadows	La sombra del caminante	Ciro Guerra	Drama.
2004	Venezuela; Chile; Spain; Uruguay	Step Forward	Punto y raya	Elia Schneider	Action, Crime, Drama, Romance, War.
2004	United States	Last Flight Out		Jerry Jameson	Adventure, Drama.
2005	Colombia; Mexico; Spain; Brazil	Rosario Tijeras		Emilio Maillé	Crime, Drama, Romance. Based on the novel Rosario Tijeras.
2005	Colombia	Apocalipsouth	Apocalipsur	Javier Mejía	Drama.
2006	Argentina; Colombia	A Ton of Luck	Soñar no Cuesta Nada	Rodrigo Triana	Comedy, Drama.
2006	United States	Á Colombia		Ryan Byrne	Drama.
2007	United States	Towards Darkness	Hacia la oscuridad	Antonio Negret	Crime, Drama, Thriller.
2008	Colombia	Dog Eat Dog	Perro Come Perro	Carlos Moreno	Thriller.
2008	Colombia; United States		Paraíso travel	Simón Brand	Drama. Based on the novel Paraíso travel.
2008	Colombia; Venezuela	The actors in the conflict	Los actores del conflicto	Lisandro Duque Naranjo	Comedy, Drama, War.
2008	Colombia	The Miraculous	La milagrosa	Rafael Lara	Drama, War.
2009	United States	Behind Enemy Lines: Colombia		Tim Matheson	Action, Thriller.
2009	Colombia	Gabriel's Passion	La Pasión de Gabriel	Luis Alberto Restrepo	Drama.
2009	Colombia; Spain	The Arriero	El arriero	Guillermo Calle	Drama.

== 2010s ==
Year	Country	Main title (Alternative title)	Original title (Original script)	Director	Subject
2010	Colombia; Panama	The Colors of the Mountain	Los colores de la montaña	Carlos César Arbeláez	Drama.
2011	France; United States; United Kingdom; Mexico; Canada	Colombiana		Olivier Megaton	Action, Crime, Drama, Thriller.
2011	Colombia; United States	The Snitch Cartel	El Cartel de los Sapos	Carlos Moreno	Action, Crime, Drama. Based on the novel El Cartel de los Sapos. Cali Cartel, Norte del Valle Cartel
2011	Colombia	All Your Dead Ones	Todos tus muertos	Carlos Moreno	Comedy, Drama, Mystery.
2011	Colombia; Mexico; United States	Greetings to the Devil	Saluda al diablo de mi parte	Juan Felipe Orozco	Action, Drama, Mystery, Thriller.
2011	Colombia	Colombian Postcards	Postales Colombianas	Ricardo Coral Dorado	Comedy, Crime, Drama.
2011	Colombia	Silence in Paradise	Silencio en el Paraiso	Colbert Garcia	Drama.
2012	Colombia	Chronicle of the End of the World	Crónica del fin del mundo	Mauricio Cuervo	Drama.
2012	Colombia; Brazil; France	La Playa DC		Juan Andrés Arango	Drama.
2012	Colombia; France; Mexico	The Towrope	La sirga	William Vega	Drama.
2012	France; Spain	Operation E	Operación E	Miguel Courtois	Drama, Thriller. Operation Emmanuel
2012	United States	Broken Kingdom		Daniel Gillies	Drama.
2013	Colombia	South Star	Estrella del Sur	Gabriel González Rodríguez	Drama.
2014	France; Spain; Belgium; Panama	Escobar: Paradise Lost		Andrea Di Stefano	Crime, Drama, History, Romance, Thriller. Pablo Escobar
2014	Colombia	Poppy Garden	Jardín de Amapolas	Juan Carlos Melo Guevera	Drama, Family, War.
2014	Colombia; United States	Dirty hands	Manos sucias	Josef Kubota Wladyka	Drama, Thriller.
2015	Colombia; Argentina; France	Alias Maria	Alias María	José Luis Rugeles	Drama, War.
2015	Colombia	The Seed of Silence	La semilla del silencio	Juan Felipe Cano	Crime, Drama, Thriller.
2015	Colombia; Mexico		Violencia	Jorge Forero	Drama, History, War.
2015	Colombia		Antes del fuego	Laura Mora	Thriller. Palace of Justice siege
2015	Colombia	Immortal	Siempreviva	Klych López	Drama. Based on the play La Siempreviva. Palace of Justice siege
2016	Colombia; Argentina; Netherlands; Germany; Greece	Dark Beast	Oscuro animal	Felipe Guerrero	Drama.
2016	United Kingdom; United States	The Infiltrator		Brad Furman	Biography, Crime, Drama, Thriller. Based on the autobiography The Infiltrator. Pablo Escobar, Medellín Cartel
2017	Colombia; Argentina	Killing Jesus	Matar a Jesús	Laura Mora	Crime, Drama, Thriller.
2018	Colombia; Denmark; Mexico; Germany; Switzerland; France	Birds of Passage	Pájaros de verano	Cristina Gallego; Ciro Guerra	Crime, Drama. Bonanza marimbera
2019	Colombia; Argentina; Netherlands; Germany; Sweden; Uruguay; United States; Switzerland; Denmark; France; Spain	Monos		Alejandro Landes	Adventure, Drama, Thriller.
2019	Colombia	Hero's Soul	Alma de héroe	Orlando Pardo	Action.
2019	Colombia; Brazil; Belgium; France	Valley of Souls	Tantas almas	Nicolás Rincón Gille	Drama.

== 2020s ==
Year	Country	Main title (Alternative title)	Original title (Original script)	Director	Subject
2020	United States; Colombia		El Empantanado: The Muddy	Felipe Echavarria	Drama, Thriller.
2020	Colombia	Memories of My Father	El olvido que seremos	Fernando Trueba	Drama, History. Based on the novel El olvido que seremos. Héctor Abad Gómez, Héctor Abad Faciolince
2021	Colombia	We are echoes	Somos ecos	Julián Díaz Velosa	Adventure, Drama, War.
2023	Colombia		Memento mori	Fernando López Cardona	Drama.
2023	Mexico; United States	Sound of Freedom		Alejandro Gómez Monteverde	Biography, Crime, Drama, History, Thriller.

== Science fiction, fantasy, and horror films ==
Year	Country	Main title (Alternative title)	Original title (Original script)	Director	Subject
2015	Colombia; United States	Hangman's Game		Miguel Urrutia	Horror, Mystery, Thriller.
2023	Colombia		Rapunzel, El Perro y El Brujo	Andrés Roa	Horror, Mystery.

== Television films ==
Year	Country	Main title (Alternative title)	Original title (Original script)	Director	Subject
2000	United States	The President's Man		Michael Preece	Action, Thriller.
2002	Canada	100 Days in the Jungle		Sturla Gunnarsson	Drama.

== Television series ==
Year	Country	Main title (Alternative title)	Original title (Original script)	Director	Subject
1992	United States	Drug Wars: The Cocaine Cartel		Paul Krasny	Crime, Drama.
2004-5	Colombia	The Saga, Family business	La saga, negocio de familia		Crime, Drama, Mystery.
2004-5	Colombia	The Mafia Widow	La viuda de la mafia	Sergio Osorio	Action, Drama, Romance.
2008-10	Colombia	The Cartel of Snitches	El cartel de los sapos	Luis Alberto Restrepo; Gabriel Casilimas	Action, Crime, Drama, Thriller, Horror, War. Based on the novel El Cartel de los Sapos. Andrés López López, Norte del Valle Cartel
2010	Colombia	The Crowned Goddess	La Diosa Coronada	Miguel Varoni; Rodolfo Hoyos	Drama. Angie Sanclemente Valencia
2010	Spain; Colombia	Operation Checkmate	Operación Jaque		Drama. Íngrid Betancourt, Clara Rojas, Luis Eladio Pérez, Operation Jaque
2011	Colombia	Infiltrados			Crime.
2011	Colombia	The Witch	La Bruja	Luis Alberto Restrepo	Biography, Crime, Drama, History, Thriller. Based on the book La bruja.
2012	Colombia	Pablo Escobar, The Drug Lord	Escobar: El Patrón del Mal	Laura Mora; Carlos Moreno	Biography, Crime, Drama, History, Thriller. Based on the book La parábola de Pablo. Pablo Escobar
2012	Colombia	The Butterfly	La Mariposa	Lilo Vilaplana	Crime.
2012-13	Colombia		Corazones blindados		Action, Drama.
2013	Colombia	Tres Caínes			Action, Drama. Carlos Castaño Gil, Vicente Castaño, Fidel Castaño, United Self-Defense Forces of Colombia
2013-14	Colombia		Alias el Mexicano		Drama. José Gonzalo Rodríguez Gacha
2013-14	Colombia		Comando élite		Drama.
2013-present	Mexico; Colombia	Lord of the Skies	El Señor de los Cielos		Action, Crime, Drama, Romance, Thriller. Amado Carrillo Fuentes
2014-15	United States	State of Affairs			Drama, Thriller.
2014-15	Colombia	Into the Wolf's Mouth	En la boca del lobo		Crime. Based on the book En la boca del lobo: La historia jamás contada del hombre que hizo caer el cartel de Cali. Cali Cartel
2014-16	Colombia; Mexico; United States	The Black Widow	La viuda negra		Crime, Drama. Based on the book La patrona de Pablo Escobar. Griselda Blanco
2015	Colombia; Mexico	Shot of Grace	Tiro de gracia		Crime.
2015-17	United States; Colombia	Narcos		José Padilha	Biography, Crime, Drama, Thriller. Pablo Escobar, Medellín Cartel, Drug Enforcement Administration, Cali Cartel
2018-19	Colombia	Wild District	Distrito Salvaje		Action, Crime, Drama, Thriller.

== See also ==
- List of films depicting Colombia
