= 7th Macondo Awards =

- Date: November 17, 2018
- Site: Ágora Bogotá Convention Center; Bogotá, Colombia

Highlights
- Best Film: Killing Jesus
- Most awards: Killing Jesus (5)
- Most nominations: Killing Jesus (11)

Television coverage
- Network: Canal Capital

The 7th Macondo Awards ceremony, presented by the Colombian Academy of Cinematography Arts and Sciences, honored the best audiovisual productions of 2018. It took place on November 17, 2018, at the Ágora Bogotá Convention Center in Bogotá. The ceremony awarded 18 categories and was broadcast by Canal Capital.

The film Killing Jesus won the award for Best Film.

== Winners and nominees ==
Best Picture: Killing Jesus; The Dragon Defense; The Sacrifice; Sal	Best Director: Laura Mora – Killing Jesus; Nicolás van Hemelryck, Clare Weiskopf – Amazona; Rubén Mendoza – Señorita Maria; Santiago Caicedo – Virus Tropical
Best Actor: Enrique Carriazo – Amalia the Secretary; Jorge Herrera – Hangman's Game; Juan Pablo Barragán – La sargento Matacho; Alexander Betancur – The Sacrifice; José Ángel Bichir – Virginia Casta	Best Actress: Marcela Benjumea – Amalia the Secretary; Fabiana Medina – La sargento Matacho; Diana Pérez – Sal; Juliana Betancourth – Virginia Casta
Best Supporting Actor: Camilo Escobar – Killing Jesus; Fabio Rubiano – Amalia the Secretary; Francisco Bolívar – Nadie sabe para quién trabaja; Aldemar Correa – Virginia Casta	Best Supporting Actress: Patricia Tamayo – Amalia the Secretary; Carmenza Cossio – Killing Jesus; Cristina Umaña – Virginia Casta; Marcela Carvajal – Virginia Casta
Best Screenplay: Laura Mora, Alonso Torres – Killing Jesus; Marcela Rincón – Lila's Book; Natalia Santa – The Dragon Defense; Enrique Lozano – Virus Tropical	Best Cinematography: David Gallego – Sal; Nicolás van Hemelryck – Amazona; James L. Brown – Killing Jesus; Iván Herrera, Nicolás Ordoñez – The Dragon Defense
Best Editing: Gustavo Vasco – Amazona; Sebastián Hernández – Bad Lucky Goat; Leandro Aste – Killing Jesus; Rubén Mendoza, Juan David Soto, Gustavo Vasco – Señorita María	Best Art Direction: Marcela Gómez – Sal; Tatiana Espitia, Daniel Murillo – Lila's Book; Marcela Gómez – The Dragon Defense; Ramsés Benjumea – The Sacrifice; Power Paola – Virus Tropical
Best Sound Design: Guido Berenblum, Gerardo Kalmar, Carlos Lopera – Killing Jesus; César Salazar, Jean Guy Véran – Sal; Juan Manuel López, Daniel Vásquez – The Dragon Defense; Carlos García, Marco Salaverria – The Sacrifice	Best Costume Design: Ana María Acosta – Sal; Helena del Mar – Bad Lucky Goat; Ana María Acosta – Killing Jesus; Julián Grijalba – The Dragon Defense
Best Makeup: Ana María Acosta – Sal; Helena del Mar – Bad Lucky Goat; Laura Copó – Killing Jesus; Julián Grijalba – The Dragon Defense	Best Visual Effects: Héctor Acosta – The Sacrifice; Juan Camilo Lezaca, Leo Otero – Hangman's Game; Bruno Fauceglia, Pablo Herrera, Santiago Svirsky – Killing Jesus; Camilo Valero – Vía crucis
Best Original Score: Camilo Sanabria – Amazona; Alejandro Ramírez Rojas – La sargento Matacho; Juan Andrés Otálora – Lila's Book; Adriana García Galán – Virus Tropical	Best Original Song: Adriana García Galán – Virus Tropical; Diego Gómez, Elkin Robinson – Bad Lucky Goat; Holman Álvarez – Sal; Gonzalo de Sagarminaga – The Dragon Defense
Best Documentary: Clare Weiskopf – Amazona; Erwin Göggel – Poner a actuar pájaros; Rubén Mendoza – Señorita Maria	Best Animation Film: Santiago Caicedo – Virus Tropical; Marcela Rincón – Lila's Book

== See also ==
- List of Colombian films
- Macondo Awards
- 2018 in film
