= 5th Fénix Awards =

- Date: November 7, 2018
- Site: Teatro de la Ciudad, Mexico City, Mexico

Highlights
- Best Film: Birds of Passage
- Best Actor: Lorenzo Ferro; El Angel
- Best Actress: Carmiña Martínez; Birds of Passage
- Most awards: Zama (4)
- Most nominations: Zama and Birds of Passage (9)

The 5th Fénix Awards was presented at Mexico City's Teatro de la Ciudad, on November 7, 2018 to honour the best in Ibero-American films of 2017-2018.

Zama and Birds of Passage received the most nominations with nine, with the first receiving the most, four.

== Winners and nominees ==
Best Film	Best Director
Birds of Passage • Colombia; Alanis • Argentina; Good Manners • Brazil; Cocote • Argentina; The Heiresses • Paraguay; Museum • Mexico; Zama • Argentina	Marcelo Martinessi – The Heiresses; Anahí Berneri – Alanis; Julio Hernández Cordón - Buy Me a Gun; Laura Mora - Killing Jesus; Alonso Ruizpalacios - Museum; Ciro Guerra and Cristina Gallego - Birds of Passage; Lucrecia Martel - Zama
Best Actor	Best Actress
Lorenzo Ferro - El Angel as Carlos Robledo Puch; Javier Gutiérrez - The Motive as Álvaro Martín; Gael García Bernal - Museum as Juan Núñez; Rodrigo Santoro - Un Traductor as Malin; Daniel Giménez Cacho - Zama as Don Diego de Zama	Carmiña Martínez - Birds of Passage as Úrsula; Sofía Gala Castiglione - Alanis as Alanis; Karine Teles - Benzinho as Irene; Antonella Costa - Dry Martina as Martina; Bárbara Lennie - A Sort of Family as Malena
Best Screenplay	Best Cinematography
Killing Jesus - Laura Mora y Alonso Torres; The Heiresses - Marcelo Martinessi; Birds of Passage - María Camila Arias y Jacques Toulemonde; Petra - Jaime Rosales, Michel Gaztambide y Clara Roquet; Zama - Lucrecia Martel	Zama - Rui Poças; El Angel - Julián Apezteguía; The Heiresses - Luis Armando Arteaga; Museum - Damián García; Birds of Passage - David Gallego

=== Special awards ===
- Fénix Award for Cinematographic Work: Luiz Carlos Barreto
- Fénix Award for Critical Work: Luciano Monteagudo
- Fénix Award for the Exhibitors: Perfect Strangers
