= Motovun Film Festival =

Annual film festival in Motovun, Croatia

Coordinates: 45°10′N 15°30′E

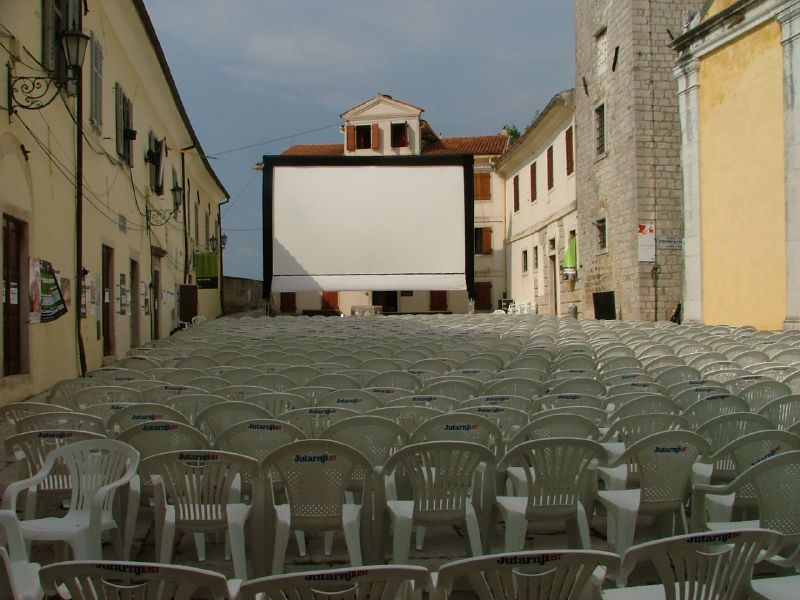
- Location: Motovun, Croatia
- Founded: 1999
- Language: International
- Website: http://www.motovunfilmfestival.com

The Motovun Film Festival (Croatian: Motovunski filmski festival) is an annual film festival established in 1999 and held in the small town of Motovun, Croatia until 2023, when it moved to a new location, Petehovac in Gorski Kotar. It usually takes place over five or six days in late July or early August.

== Overview ==
Festival logo

Motovun Film Festival is entirely dedicated to films made in small studios and independent film productions. Founded by film director Rajko Grlić and producer Boris T. Matić, it was first organized in the late 1990s to fill the gap in cinema repertoire as there were almost no non-Hollywood films in wide distribution in Croatia at the time. Every year, the festival program consists of around 70 titles from all over the world, from documentaries to feature films, short and feature-length films, from guerrilla-made films to co-productions.

Over time the festival has become widely popular, especially among young people both locally and abroad. Every year during the festival, a camp for visitors is organized next to the festival site. The festivalgoers' camp has become one of the hallmarks of the festival. In January 2007, the British newspaper The Guardian described the festival as "a cross between Glastonbury and Sundance." It is often referred to as "a Woodstock of film festivals".

The festival also grew in status on the festival circuit. From an event that was once considered a "backpacker's film festival," by 2007 it was recognized as one of the two most important film festivals held on the territory of the former Yugoslavia, along with the Sarajevo Film Festival.

The 2011 festival, which was supposed to be its 13th edition, was re-numbered by organizers as the 14th, in order to skip the unlucky number 13. The skipped year was maintained in all later festival editions, until 2021 (officially the 24th edition). For the 2022 festival, the last one held exclusively in Motovun, the skipped numbering was abandoned, so that it was officially designated 24th as well. And the 2023 edition - held in both Motovun and in Gorski Kotar, was officially designated as the "25th."

In 2023 it was announced that the festival would expand to another location, the mountain lodge settlement of Petehovac near Delnice in the mountainous region of Gorski Kotar, some 80 kilometers east of Motovun. That year the festival was held in both locations. The screenings at Petehovac were branded "Cinehill," in reference to the informal nickname given to the original MFF event, as the "hill of films." In 2024 the festival, now called Cinehill, was entirely moved to Petehovac, and is no longer held at Motovun.

== Awards ==
The main award at the festival is called Propeller Motovuna (English: The Propeller of Motovun, inspired by the prominent wind turbines located near Motovun).

Other awards at the festival are the Motovun Online award for best short film, the odAdoA (From 'A' to 'A') award for best film in the regional competition (the name of the award is short for From Austria to Albania, roughly describing the region covered), and the film critics' FIPRESCI Award.

In 2008, the Motovun Maverick Award was introduced, given to notable filmmakers for lifetime achievement. Its first recipient was Ken Russell. In 2013, Mohsen Makhmalbaf and The Gardener were given the award.

== Award winners ==
=== Cinehill Propeller ===
Known as Propeller of Motovun from 2000 to 2022, in reference to windmills dotting the festival's former location at Motovun, this is the main award of the festival, given to the best film screened in the main feature film program. Renamed Cinehill Propeller after the festival's rebranding in 2023 and move to its new location in the Gorski Kotar mountains in 2024.

Year	International title	Director	Country
2000 (2nd)	Billy Elliot	Stephen Daldry	United Kingdom
2001 (3rd)	Last Resort	Paweł Pawlikowski	United Kingdom
2002 (4th)	Bloody Sunday	Paul Greengrass	United Kingdom
2003 (5th)	Punch-Drunk Love	Paul Thomas Anderson	United States
2004 (6th)	Ae Fond Kiss…	Ken Loach	United Kingdom
2005 (7th)	The Death of Mr. Lazarescu	Cristi Puiu	Romania
2006 (8th)	Look Both Ways	Sarah Watt	Australia
2007 (9th)	Sweet Mud	Dror Shaul	Israel
2008 (10th)	Silent Light	Carlos Reygadas	Mexico
2009 (11th)	Fish Tank	Andrea Arnold	United Kingdom
2010 (12th)	October	Daniel and Diego Vega Vidal	Peru
2011 (14th)	Bullhead	Michaël R. Roskam	Belgium
2012 (15th)	The Delay	Rodrigo Plá	Uruguay
2013 (16th)	The Plague	Neus Ballús	Spain
2014 (17th)	The Tribe	Myroslav Slaboshpytskiy	Ukraine
2015 (18th)	The Wakhan Front	Clément Cogitore	France
2016 (19th)	Viva	Paddy Breathnach	Ireland
2017 (20th)	Western	Valeska Grisebach	Germany
2018 (21st)	Killing Jesus	Laura Mora	Colombia
2019 (22nd)	A White, White Day	Hlynur Pálmason	Iceland
2020 (23rd)	My Morning Laughter	Marko Đorđević	Serbia
2021 (24th)	Pleasure	Ninja Thyberg	Sweden
2022 (24th)	War Pony	Riley Keough and Gina Gammell	United States
2023 (25th)	Falcon	Charlotte Le Bon	Canada
2024 (26th)	When the Light Breaks	Rúnar Rúnarsson	Iceland

=== FIPRESCI Prize ===
Year	International title	Director	Country
2001 (3rd)	No Man's Land	Danis Tanović	Bosnia and Herzegovina
2002 (4th)	Grill Point	Andreas Dresen	Germany
2003 (5th)	Margarette's Feast	Renato Falcão	Brazil
2004 (6th)	The Five Obstructions	Lars von Trier and Jørgen Leth	Denmark
2005 (7th)	Day and Night	Simon Staho	Sweden
2006 (8th)	We Feed the World	Erwin Wagenhofer	Austria
2007 (9th)	Hallam Foe	David Mackenzie	United Kingdom
2008 (10th)	Blind Loves	Juraj Lehotský	Slovakia
2009 (11th)	Fish Tank	Andrea Arnold	United Kingdom
2010 (12th)	The Four Times	Michelangelo Frammartino	Italy
2011 (14th)	Martha	Marcelino Islas Hernández	Mexico
2012 (15th)	Play	Ruben Östlund	Sweden
2013 (16th)	The Daughter	Thanos Anastopoulos	Greece
2014 (17th)	Force Majeure	Ruben Östlund	Sweden
2015 (18th)	Magical Girl	Carlos Vermut	Spain
2016 (19th)	A Good Wife	Mirjana Karanović	Serbia
2017 (20th)	Western	Valeska Grisebach	Germany
2018 (21st)	Birds of Passage	Cristina Gallego and Ciro Guerra	Colombia
2019 (22nd)	God Exists, Her Name Is Petrunya	Teona Strugar Mitevska	North Macedonia
2020 (23rd)	My Morning Laughter	Marko Đorđević	Serbia
2021 (24th)	Factory to the Workers	Srđan Kovačević	Croatia
2022 (24th)	The Sacred Spirit	Chema García Ibarra	Spain
2023 (25th)	Blaga's Lessons	Stephan Komandarev	Bulgaria
2024 (26th)	When the Light Breaks	Rúnar Rúnarsson	Iceland

== Notable guests ==
People who visited the festival include:

- Dušan Makavejev
- Stephen Daldry
- Paul Thomas Anderson
- Ken Russell
- Vanessa Redgrave
- Amanda Plummer
- Mira Furlan
- Milena Dravić
- Jason Biggs
- Jamie Bell
