= Lorenzo Ferro =

Argentine actor and singer (born 1998)

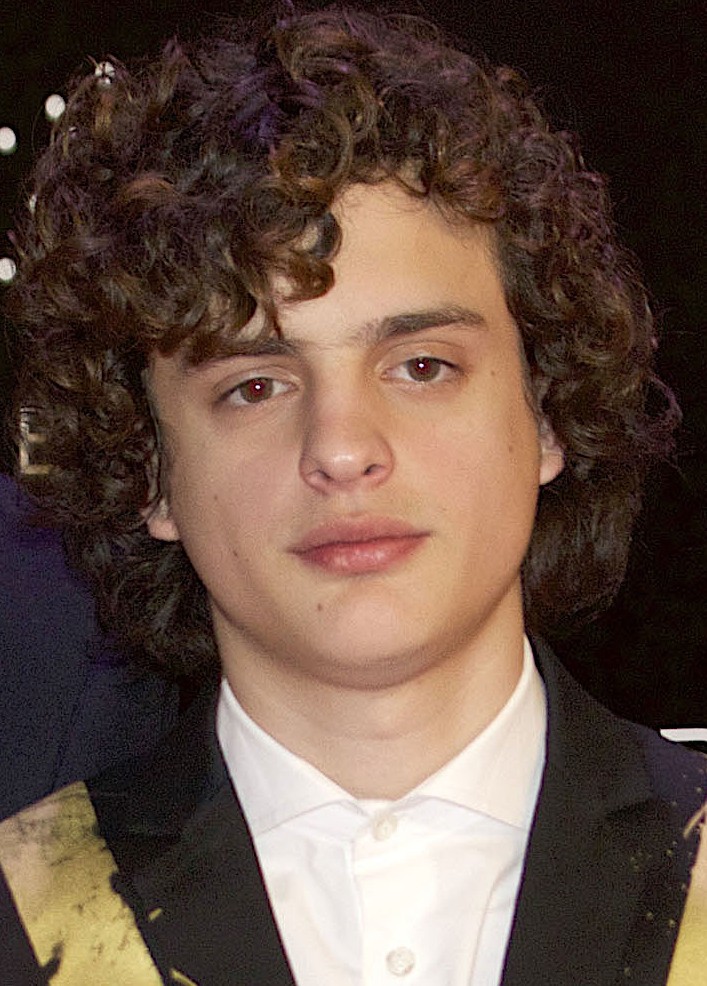
- Ferro at the 5th Fénix Awards in 2018
- Born: 9 November 1998 (age 27); Buenos Aires, Argentina
- Other name: Kiddo Toto
- Occupations: Actor; filmmaker; singer; songwriter
- Years active: 2018–present
- Father: Rafael Ferro

Lorenzo "Toto" Ferro (Latin American Spanish: [loˌɾenso ˈfero]; born 9 November 1998) is an Argentine actor, filmmaker, singer and songwriter. He gained recognition for playing Robledo Puch in the 2018 film El ángel. His television roles include Cristian Pardo in the third season of El marginal (2019) and Alex Hodoyan in the third season of Narcos: Mexico (2021). His feature film directorial debut, The River Train (2026), which he co-directed with Lucas A. Vignale, premiered at the 76th Berlin International Film Festival.

Ferro releases music under the stage name Kiddo Toto. He has released two studio albums: Resfriado (Note: Stylised as Re$friado) (2019) and Mansión helada (2021).

== Early life ==
Lorenzo Ferro was born on 9 November 1998 in Buenos Aires. He is the eldest son of actor Rafael Ferro and costume designer Cecilia Allassia. He grew up in Belgrano. He attended a local Catholic school for his primary education, and later went to the Jewish Institute ORT for high school.

== Filmography ==
=== Film ===
Year	Title	Role	Notes
2018	El ángel	Robledo Puch	Main role
2024	Simon of the Mountain	Simón	Main role
2025	The Bewilderment of Chile		
2026	Casi todo bien	Pabli	
2026	The River Train		Director

=== Television ===
Year	Title	Role	Notes
2019	El marginal	Cristian Pardo	Main role
2021	Narcos: Mexico	Alex Hodoyan	Main role
2022	Fanático	Lázaro / Salva Quimera	Main role

== Discography ==
=== Studio albums ===
List of studio albums, with selected details
Title	Details
Resfriado	Released: 15 March 2019; Label: self-released; Format: digital download, streaming
Mansión helada	Released: 2 December 2021; Label: self-released; Format: digital download, streaming

=== Singles ===
==== As lead artist ====
List of singles as lead artist, showing year released, chart positions, and originating album
Title	Year	Peak chart positions	Album
Title	Year	ARG	Album
"Choqué el auto e papá"	2018	—	Resfriado
"Pary 10" (with Gandu)	2019	—	Resfriado
"Kiddo Toto: Bzrp Music Sessions, Vol. 11" (with Bizarrap)	2019	—	Non-album single
"Two 1 Two" (with Cieloazul)	2019	72	Non-album single
"Scoco" (with Louta and Bhavi)	2020	—	Non-album single
"Jordan" (with Lucho SSJ)	2020	—	Non-album single
"Waxxa" (with Oniria, Big Soto and Jesse Baez)	2020	—	Non-album single
"Caen" (with Cieloazul)	2020	—	Non-album single
"Mucho" (with Malena Villa)	2020	—	Non-album single
"Penas idiotas"	2021	—	Non-album single

==== As featured artist ====
List of singles as featured artist, showing year released, and originating album
Title	Year	Album
"Jaguar" (Cieloazul featuring Kiddo Toto)	2020	Selva
"El mejor" (Elio Toffana featuring Kiddo Toto)	2022	Shock Wave

=== Guest appearances ===
List of non-single guest appearances, showing year released, other performing artists, and originating album
Title	Year	Other artist(s)	Album
"Tiempo"	2020	Gandu	Tiempo

== Awards and nominations ==
List of awards and nominations received by Lorenzo Ferro
Ceremony	Year	Nominated work	Category	Result	Ref.
Fénix Awards	2018	El ángel	Best Actor	Won	
Havana Film Festival	2018	El ángel	Best Actor	Won	
Platino Awards	2019	El ángel	Best Actor	Nominated	
Silver Condor Awards	2019	El ángel	Best Male Newcomer	Won	
Sur Awards	2018	El ángel	Best Male Newcomer	Won	
