= Cortes (miniseries) =

Planned but canceled American miniseries

- Genre: Historical period drama
- Created by: Steven Zaillian
- Based on: Montezuma by Dalton Trumbo
- Written by: Steven Zaillian
- Directed by: Ciro Guerra; Cristina Gallego
- Starring: Javier Bardem
- Country of origin: United States
- Original language: English

Production
- Executive producers: Steven Zaillian; Grant Hill; Darryl Frank; Justin Falvey; Javier Bardem; Gael García Bernal; Diego Luna
- Production company: Amblin Television

Original release
- Network: Amazon Prime Video

Related
- Hernán

Cortés was a never-completed American historical drama streaming television miniseries created and written by Steven Zaillian and starring Javier Bardem. The series was set to premiere on Amazon Prime Video, but filming was cancelled in early 2020, after only two weeks, due to the COVID-19 pandemic.

== Premise ==
The four-episode series was to follow "the legendary conqueror, Hernán Cortés, who led a rebellious expedition to the heart of King Moctezuma II’s Aztec Empire, connecting two civilizations for the first time and changing the course of history."

== Cast and characters ==
- Javier Bardem as Hernán Cortés
- Tenoch Huerta as Moctezuma II
- Yoshira Escárrega as Malintzin / Marina
- Gregory Zaragoza as Tlenamacac

== Production ==
=== Development ===
In 1965, screenwriter Dalton Trumbo finished a 205-page draft of a screenplay entitled Montezuma, with a story centered around the complicated relationship between Spanish conquistador Hernán Cortés and Aztec leader Moctezuma II. The film was written with intent of having Martin Ritt direct and Kirk Douglas play the role of Cortés. The production ultimately never came together.

In 2014, it was reported that Steven Spielberg was considering directing Montezuma from a screenplay written by Steven Zaillian, based on the original script by Trumbo. It was further reported that the film might be retitled Cortes, as the new screenplay featured him as the main character.

On March 26, 2018, it was announced that the project had been redeveloped into a television miniseries and that Amazon had given it an order for four episodes. Javier Bardem, initially attached to the project as a feature film, was cast in the lead role of Hernán Cortés. The series was created and written by Steven Zaillian, who was also set to executive produce alongside Spielberg, Darryl Frank, Justin Falvey, and Bardem. On October 3, 2019, it was reported that Ciro Guerra and Cristina Gallegos would direct the miniseries, while Gael García Bernal and Diego Luna would executive produce.

=== Casting ===
In February 2020, it was announced that Tenoch Huerta would play Moctezuma II, Aztec Emperor, with Yoshira Escárrega in the role of Malintzin or Marina, the strategic partner, translator and consort of Hernán Cortés. Ammar Aldieri was cast as Tapeia.

=== Production ===
The miniseries was two weeks into filming in Mexico City in March 2020, when production was suspended due to the COVID-19 pandemic. It was being filmed in Spanish, Nahuatl and Chontal Mayan, from scripts translated by David Bowles. In September 2020, Amazon withdrew from its partnership with Amblin on the miniseries, scrapping the project, due to complications from the still-ongoing pandemic.
