= Crime Diaries: Night Out =

Colombian Spanish-language crime TV miniseries

- Genre: Crime
- Starring: Ernesto Campos; Carlos Carvajal; Camila Jurado
- Country of origin: Colombia
- Original language: Spanish
- No. of episodes: 8

Original release
- Network: Netflix
- Release: 3 May 2019

Crime Diaries: Night Out (Spanish: Historia de un crimen: Colmenares), is a 2019 Colombian-Mexican Spanish-language crime television miniseries starring Ernesto Campos, Carlos Carvajal and Camila Jurado. The plot is inspired by real-life events, and revolves around how after a Halloween party on October 31, 2010, the student Luis Andrés Colmenares is found dead in a park in the north of Bogotá. The series recounts how two women close to Colmenares and an ex-boyfriend of one of them seems to be involved, and judicial process following the investigation.

It was ordered direct-to-series, and premiered on Netflix streaming on May 3, 2019.

== Cast ==
- Ernesto Campos as Jorge Colmenares
- Carlos Carvajal as Tato
- Camila Jurado as Mireya
- Fabiana Medina as Oneida Escobar
- Laura Osma as Laura Moreno
- Juliana Velásquez as Jessy Quintero
- Carlos Vergara as Alonso Colmenares
- Enrique Carriazo as Luis Antonio González
- Julián Román as periodista Salazar
- Juan Pablo Urrego as Carlos Cárdenas
- Diana Wiswell as Claudia
- Simon Elias as Esqueleto
- Amparo Conde as Mamá Jessi Quintero
- Fabio Rubiano as Fernando Alvarado

== Episodes ==
No.	Title	Directed by	Written by	Original release date
1	"A Dark Halloween Night"	Juan Felipe Cano	Pablo González & C.S. Prince	May 3, 2019
After a night of fledgling romance and celebrations with friends, the university student Luis Andrés Colmenares mysteriously disappears.
2	"A Mother Seeks Justice"	Juan Felipe Cano	Pablo González & C.S. Prince	May 3, 2019
Days, weeks and months later, the mystery remains. Oneida demands answers from the authorities and receives clues from beyond. Laura has visions about Luis Andrés.
3	"When Bodies Talk"	Juan Felipe Cano	Pablo González, C.S. Prince & Nicolás Serrano	May 3, 2019
It is ordered to exhume the body of Luis Andrés. Upon finding an incriminating letter, prosecutor González intensifies his investigation. Salazar makes a journalistic proposal.
4	"Pain, Justice, and Ideals"	Felipe Martínez Amador	Pablo González, C.S. Prince & Natalia Santa	May 3, 2019
The judicial hearing of Laura and Jessy begins. Oneida's mother urges her daughter to accept that Luis is gone. A comment in the media catches Jorge's attention.
5	"A Rumor in Los Cerros"	Felipe Martínez Amador	Anton Goenechea, Pablo González & C.S. Prince	May 3, 2019
González points to Carlos Cárdenas, but soon it will be the prosecutor himself who is in question. Salazar gets a surprise. Oneida fears for her son's soul.
6	"A Witness Appears"	Felipe Martínez Amador	Pablo González, C.S. Prince & Nicolás Serrano	May 3, 2019
A new witness claims to have witnessed a beating that occurred at dawn on Halloween night. The authorities arrest a suspect. Salazar interviews Moreno.
7	"A Hole in the Story"	Juan Felipe Cano	Pablo González, C.S. Prince & Natalia Santa	May 3, 2019
Salazar is not convinced to catalog the death of Luis Andrés as homicide. Ramses does not trust Gonzalez, who makes a bold statement at the Cardenas hearing.
8	"The Final Judgement"	Juan Felipe Cano	Pablo González, C.S. Prince & Nicolás Serrano	May 3, 2019
A new prosecutor takes the case. Salazar illegally analyzes phone records. The judge orders to recreate the search in the tunnel and gives her ruling on Jessy and Laura.

== Release ==
Crime Diaries: Night Out was released on Netflix streaming on May 3, 2019.
