= Cristina Gallego =

Colombian producer, writer and director

Cristina Gallego is a Colombian producer, writer and director.

== Career ==
Gallego began her career in 2004 producing Wandering Shadows, a film by her then husband Ciro Guerra.

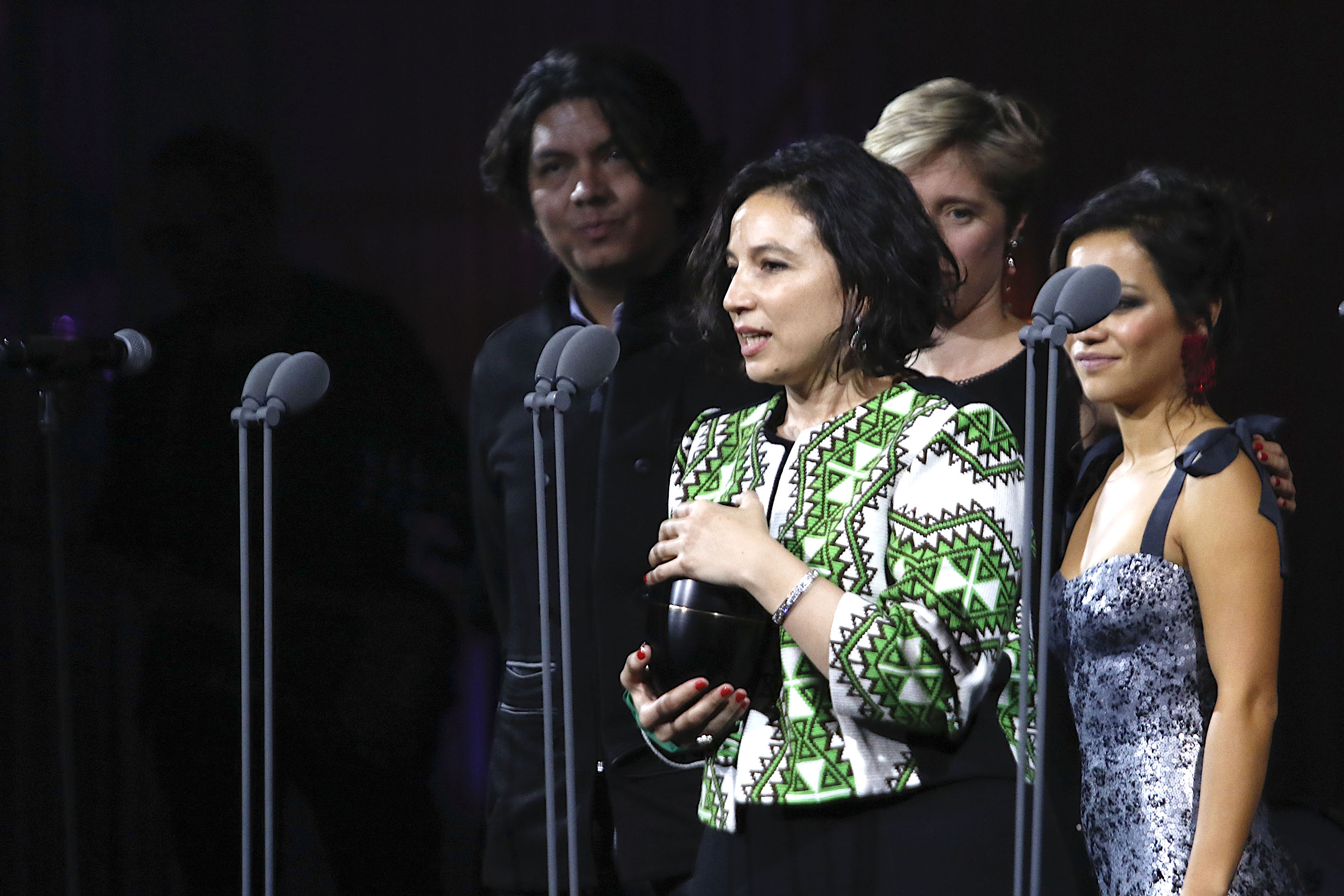

In 2009 while producing another Guerra film The Wind Journeys the pair befriended members of the Wayuu community. They spent the following ten years researching material for their film Birds of Passage which follows a Wayuu family as they abandon traditions and fall into the drug trade. Gallego made her directorial debut with the film which she codirected with Guerra. The film premiered in the Directors' Fortnight section at the 2018 Cannes Film Festival. It was selected as the Colombian entry for the Best Foreign Language Film at the 91st Academy Awards, making the December shortlist.

In 2019 she announced she would team up with Guerra again to co-direct the miniseries Cortes.

== Personal life ==
Gallego was formerly married to writer-director Ciro Guerra. They have two children. The couple divorced during the filming of Birds of Passage which they co-directed.

Her brother is cinematographer David Gallego.
