= El Angel (film) =

2018 film by Luis Ortega

- Film poster
- Spanish: El ángel
- Directed by: Luis Ortega
- Written by: Luis Ortega
- Produced by: Agustín Almodóvar; Pedro Almodóvar
- Starring: Cecilia Roth; Luis Gnecco; Mercedes Morán; Peter Lanzani; Chino Darín; Lorenzo Ferro
- Cinematography: Julián Apezteguia
- Edited by: Guillermo Gatti
- Production companies: K&S Films; El Deseo; Underground Contenidos
- Distributed by: 20th Century Fox (Argentina); BTeam Pictures (Spain)
- Release dates: 11 May 2018 (Cannes); 9 August 2018 (Argentina)
- Running time: 118 minutes
- Countries: Argentina; Spain
- Language: Spanish
- Box office: $5.6 million

El Angel (Spanish: El ángel) is a 2018 crime drama film directed by Luis Ortega. It was screened in the Un Certain Regard section at the 2018 Cannes Film Festival. It is inspired by the true story of Argentine serial killer Carlos Robledo Puch. It was selected as the Argentine entry for the Best Foreign Language Film at the 91st Academy Awards, but it was not nominated.

== Plot ==
In 1971, Carlos is a 17-year-old high school student living with his parents in a middle-class neighborhood of Buenos Aires. Despite his angelic appearance, he habitually breaks into houses to steal, often giving away or abandoning what he takes. At school, he meets Ramón Peralta, a classmate also involved in crime. Ramón introduces Carlos to his parents, Ana María and José, a former convict who teaches Carlos how to shoot.

Carlos, Ramón, and José rob a gun shop. When Carlos strays from the plan to steal extra ammunition, the group confronts him about his recklessness, but agrees to keep working together. Carlos and Ramón later break into a mansion. Startled when the owner turns on a light, Carlos shoots and kills him. They escape with a painting, which Ramón takes to Federica, a wealthy art collector who agrees to buy stolen paintings in exchange for sexual favors from Ramón and promises to help him launch a television career, an idea Carlos opposes. Later that night, Carlos and Ramón return to a bar where the bartender had previously insulted Ramon; Carlos discovers two sleeping men inside and shoots them both dead. Worried about Carlos’s absences, his mother, Aurora, confronts Ramón’s parents, though they manipulate her into staying quiet.

Carlos and Ramón are arrested while driving a stolen car. The police chief releases Carlos on the condition that he return with the vehicle's registration papers, but Carlos flees after realizing it was a trap. Carlos returns home with a bag full of money; though his father, Héctor, threatens to report him, he ultimately buries the money in their backyard. Carlos soon runs into Ramón, who introduces him to Miguel Prieto, an ex-convict working for José. The three of them rob a dairy truck; when the driver tries to defend himself with a gun, Carlos shoots him dead. Discovering Federica's plan to take Ramón to Paris, Carlos deliberately causes a car crash that kills Ramón. Miguel then becomes Carlos's new partner.

In 1972, Carlos and Miguel break into a jewelry store. When Miguel accidentally wakes the night watchman, Carlos shoots him. After cracking the safe only to find it empty, Miguel accuses Carlos of hiding the loot. In response, Carlos murders Miguel and burns his face with a blowtorch to hinder identification.

The following day, Carlos is arrested and confesses to all his crimes. The media quickly dubs him "The Angel of Death" due to his youthful features. While in custody, Carlos swallows a spoon to get transferred to an infirmary, enabling his escape through a window. Crying silently on a bus, he takes shelter in Ramón's abandoned home. After calling his mother, who pleads him to surrender, Carlos reveals his location to her. While waiting for the police to arrive, he dances alone inside the empty house.

== Cast ==
- Lorenzo Ferro as Carlos Robledo Puch
- Chino Darín as Ramón Peralta
- Mercedes Morán as Ana María Peralta
- Daniel Fanego as José Peralta
- Luis Gnecco as Héctor Robledo Puch
- Peter Lanzani as Miguel Prieto
- Cecilia Roth as Aurora Robledo Puch
- Malena Villa as Marisol/Magdalena

== Reception ==
Monica Castillo of RogerEbert.com wrote that director Luis Ortega took liberties with the inspiration story by reimagining Carlos as a gay psychopathic killer, despite a lack of any proof this was true in reality. Castillo complimented lead actor Lorenzo Ferro's performance as "eerily hollow and effectively scary" but said eventually "the character's eerie coldness leaves the movie feeling shallow." For The Canadian Press, David Friend said Ferro's performance evokes "the demonic cuteness of Macaulay Culkin in The Good Son."

Kerry Lengel of Arizona Republic said, "Ferro really has created a fascinating screen character. He is, in a word, sexy, and not just for his androgynous beauty but for that supposedly masculine glamour of the daredevil, the outlaw who refuses to play by society's rules." On Rotten Tomatoes the film has a 73% approval rating from critics based on 56 reviews. The site's critics consensus reads: "As unsettling as it is entertaining, El ángel takes an absorbingly stylish look at the horrific exploits of a real-life serial killer."

== Release ==
In March 2018, Film Factory negotiated a deal with K&S Films and Underground Productions to release El Angel in Spain. At the same time, UGC Distribution acquired the rights for French distribution of the film. In June of the same year, The Orchard has negotiatiated a deal with Film Factory on releasing El Angel in the United States.

== See also ==
- List of submissions to the 91st Academy Awards for Best Foreign Language Film
- List of Argentine submissions for the Academy Award for Best Foreign Language Film
