= My Morning Laughter =

2019 film

- Directed by: Marko Đorđević
- Written by: Marko Đorđević
- Starring: Filip Đurić; Ivana Vuković; Jasna Đuričić; Nebojša Glogovac; Bratislav Slavković
- Cinematography: Stefan Milosavljević
- Release dates: December 2019 (Belgrade Festival of Auteur Film); 13 February 2020 (Serbia)
- Running time: 94 minutes
- Country: Serbia
- Language: Serbian

My Morning Laughter (Serbian: Moj jutarnji smeh; Serbian Cyrillic: Мој јутарњи смех) is a 2019 Serbian feature film written and directed by Marko Đorđević, which was his directing debut.

The film premiered as part of the 2019 Belgrade Festival of Auteur Film where it won the Grand Prix award. It also won the Main Prize at the 2020 Motovun Film Festival.
