= Green Frontier =

Colombian television series

- Release poster
- Spanish: Frontera Verde
- Genre: Crime drama; Thriller; Supernatural
- Created by: Diego Ramírez Schrempp; Mauricio Leiva-Cock; Jenny Ceballos
- Starring: Juana del Río; Nelson Camayo; Ángela Cano; Miguel Dionisio Ramos; Gabriella Campagna; Bruno Clairefond; Andrés Crespo; Marcela Mar; Mónica Lopera; Andrés Castañeda; John Narváez; Edwin Morales; Karla López; Antonio Bolívar
- Composer: Felipe Linares
- Country of origin: Colombia
- Original language: Spanish
- No. of episodes: 8

Production
- Executive producers: Ciro Guerra; Diego Ramírez Schrempp; Andrés Calderón; Jorge Dorado; Cristian Conti
- Producer: Juliana Flórez
- Cinematography: Paulo Andres Perez
- Editors: Sebastián Hernández; Gustavo Vasco
- Camera setup: Single-camera
- Running time: 31–48 minutes
- Production company: Dynamo Producciones

Original release
- Network: Netflix
- Release: August 16, 2019

Green Frontier (Spanish: Frontera Verde) is a Colombian crime thriller television miniseries, created by Diego Ramírez Schrempp, Mauricio Leiva-Cock, and Jenny Ceballos, that premiered on Netflix on August 16, 2019. (Note: Green Frontier was the first Colombian series commissioned by Netflix, but Distrito Salvaje was streamed first on the service since Green Frontier premiered in August 2019.) The series was directed by Ciro Guerra, Jacques Toulemonde Vidal and Laura Mora Ortega and stars Juana del Río, Nelson Camayo, Ángela Cano, Miguel Dionisio Ramos, Bruno Clairefond, Andrés Crespo, Marcela Mar, Mónica Lopera, Andrés Castañeda, John Narváez, Edwin Morales, Karla López and Antonio Bolívar. It was written by Mauricio Leiva-Cock, Gibran Portela, Camila Brugés, Natalia Santa, Javier Peñalosa, Maria Camila Arias, Anton Goenechea and Nicolás Serrano.

== Synopsis ==
Green Frontier follows the story of a "young detective who travels deep into the Amazon, on the border of Brazil and Colombia, to investigate a series of bizarre murders. She soon realizes that there’s more intrigue to the jungle than the homicides, as they come across a mysterious indigenous tribe with an extraordinary secret that they will go to great lengths to protect."

== Cast and characters ==
=== Main ===
- Juana del Río as Helena Poveda
- Nelson Camayo as Reynaldo Bueno
- Ángela Cano as Ushe
- Miguel Dionisio Ramos as Yua
- Bruno Clairefond as Joseph Schultz
- Andrés Crespo as Efrain Márquez
- Marcela Mar as Hermana Raquel
- Mónica Lopera as Aura
- Andrés Castañeda as Iván Uribe
- John Narváez as Cayetano
- Edwin Morales
- Karla López as Hermana Esther
- Antonio Bolívar as Wilson Nai

=== Recurring ===
- Gabriella Campagna as Hermana Sonia

== Episodes ==
No.	Title	Directed by	Written by	Original release date
1	"The Deep Jungle"	Ciro Guerra	Mauricio Leiva-Cock & Gibrán Portela	August 16, 2019
2	"The Walkers"	Jacques Toulemonde Vidal	Antón Goenechea & María Camila Arias	August 16, 2019
3	"The Tree"	Jacques Toulemonde Vidal	Camila Brugés & Javier Peñalosa	August 16, 2019
4	"The Poison"	Jacques Toulemonde Vidal	Natalia Santa & Nicolás Serrano	August 16, 2019
5	"The Death"	Laura Mora Ortega	Camila Brugés & Gibrán Portela	August 16, 2019
6	"The Seed"	Laura Mora Ortega	Natalia Santa & Antón Goenechea	August 16, 2019
7	"The Light"	Laura Mora Ortega	Nicolás Serrano & Gibrán Portela	August 16, 2019
8	"The Dark"	Laura Mora Ortega	Mauricio Leiva-Cock & Javier Peñalosa	August 16, 2019

== Production ==
=== Development ===
On November 22, 2017, it was announced that Netflix had given the production a series order for a first season consisting of eight episodes. The series is created by Diego Ramírez Schrempp, Mauricio Leiva-Cock and Jenny Ceballos and executive produced by Schrempp, Ciro Guerra, Andrés Calderón, Jorge Dorado and Cristian Conti. Green Frontier is based on an original idea from Diego Ramírez Schrempp and Jenny Ceballos of Dynamo. The series was directed by Ciro Guerra, Laura Mora Ortega and Jacques Toulemonde Vidal and written by Mauricio Leiva-Cock, Antón Goenechea, Camila Brugrés, Gibrán Portela, Javier Peñalosa, María Camila Arias, Natalia Santa and Nicolás Serrano. Production companies involved with the series were slated to consist of Dynamo Producciones.

=== Casting ===
Sometime after the series was ordered by Netflix, it was confirmed that Juana del Río, Nelson Camayo and Ángela Cano would star in the series.

=== Filming ===
Principal photography for the first season took place on location in Leticia, Amazonas, Colombia in 2018.

== Release ==
On July 29, 2019, the official teaser for the miniseries was released. On August 5, 2019, the official trailer for the miniseries was released by Netflix.

== Reception ==
=== Critical response ===
The review aggregator website Rotten Tomatoes reported a 100% approval rating for the first season with an average rating of 7.5/10, based on 6 reviews.
