= Jairo Pinilla =

Colombian film director

Jairo José Pinilla Téllez
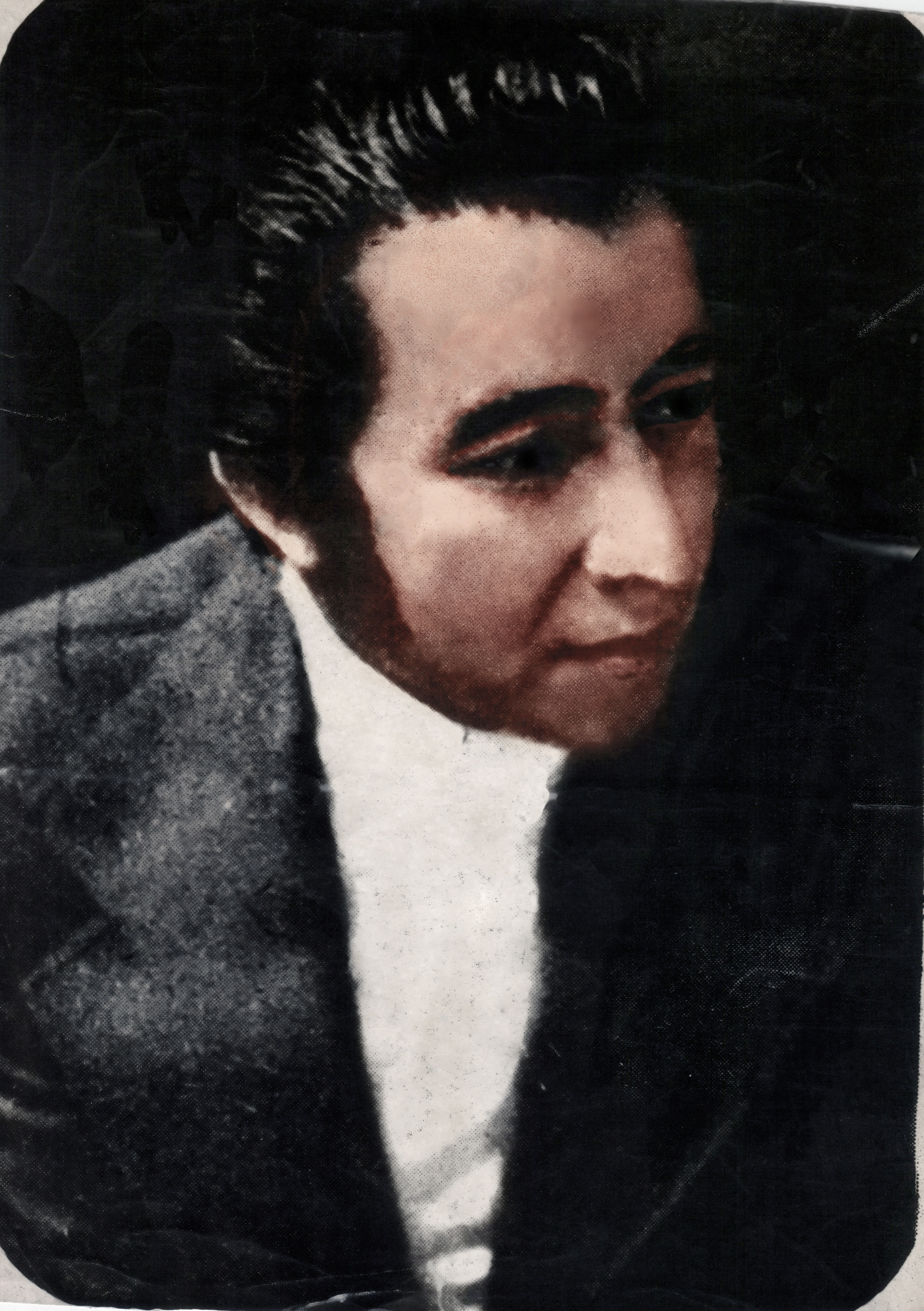
- Pinilla in 1970
- Born: 21 August 1944 (age 82); Cali, Colombia
- Occupation: Director
- Years active: 1970–present

Jairo José Pinilla Téllez (born 21 August 1944) is a Colombian film director. Considered the father of horror, suspense and science fiction in Colombia, and colloquially nicknamed "the Colombian Ed Wood".

== Biography ==
Born in Cali in 1944, he moved to Bogotá with his family at the age of four. From an early age he was attracted to themes of death and fear. The first film he saw in a movie theatre was The Thief of Baghdad. Pinilla studied electrical engineering at the Universidad Industrial de Popayán and specialized in electromechanical computers in Mexico with the North American company Burroughs Enterprise. In his free time he visited the Churubusco studios where he met the stars of Mexican cinema in the 60's. He decided to return to Colombia and make films. His first short film "Que mago" was made with reversible Black and White film and without sound, where we find for the first time in Colombia special effects in a short film. After making this film Pinilla began to put his ideas into practice, writing and directing "Cita con la época". A co-production of Asofilms and San Pablo Films, the short film was awarded a prize in Milan, Italy.

== Selected filmography ==
Year	Title	Role	Notes
1977	Funeral Siniestro		
1979	Área Maldita		
1981	27 horas con la muerte		
1983	T-O Triángulo de Oro: La Isla Fantasma		
