= Virus Tropical =

2017 animated film

- Theatrical release poster
- Directed by: Santiago Caicedo
- Screenplay by: Enrique Lozano
- Based on: Virus Tropical by Power Paola
- Produced by: Carolina Barrera Quevedo; Edwina Liard; Nidia Santiagoo
- Music by: Adriana Garcia Galán
- Production companies: Timbo Estudio; Ikki Films
- Release dates: 21 October 2017 (Animation Is Film Festival); 17 May 2018
- Running time: 97 minutes
- Countries: Colombia; Ecuador
- Language: Spanish
- Box office: $31,100

Virus Tropical is a 2017 adult animated coming-of-age drama film directed by Santiago Caicedo, based on the 2011 semi-autobiographical graphic novel of the same name by cartoonist Power Paola. From a screenplay by Enrique Lozano, Power Paola handled the film's art direction. Produced by Timbo Estudio and Ikki Films, Virus Tropical had its world premiere at the Animation Is Film Festival on 21 October 2017. It was released in Colombian cinemas on 17 May 2018, where it grossed $31,100. The film received generally positive reviews. Additionally, it won the Quirino Award for Best Ibero-American Feature Film.

== Production ==
The art direction of Virus Tropical was headed by cartoonist and writer of the titular graphic novel Power Paola. Paola produced around 5,000 individual drawings for the film, which combines 3D animation with hand-drawn animation to create a boldly graphic yet childlike aesthetic to depict the film's tone. Released in black and white, the film explores themes of sexuality, growth and one's relationship with family.

== Release ==
Virus Tropical had its world premiere at the Animation Is Film Festival on 21 October 2017, and had a limited release to 24 theatres in Colombia on 17 May 2018. It grossed $10,142 during its opening week for a total gross of $31,100 during its entire theatrical run.

=== Critical reception ===
On review aggregator Rotten Tomatoes, Virus Tropical holds an approval rating of 78% based on nine critical reviews, with an average rating of 6.30/10.
