= Wild District =

2019 Colombian television series

- Release poster
- Spanish: Distrito Salvaje
- Genre: Action, Drama
- Created by: Cristian Conti
- Directed by: Javier Fuentes-León, Carlos Moreno
- Starring: Juan Pablo Raba; Cristina Umaña; Camila Sodi
- Country of origin: Colombia
- Original language: Spanish
- No. of seasons: 2
- No. of episodes: 20

Production
- Executive producers: Andrés Calderón; Juan Pablo Raba; Javier Fuentes-León; Javier Gullón
- Producer: Natalia Echeverri
- Camera setup: Single-camera
- Production company: Dynamo Producciones

Original release
- Network: Netflix
- Release: 19 October 2018 – 8 November 2019

Wild District (Spanish: Distrito Salvaje) is a Colombian action drama television series created by Cristian Conti. The series is produced by Dynamo Producciones for Netflix and stars Juan Pablo Raba as the lead character. It tells the story of Jhon Jeiver (Juan Pablo Raba), a guerrilla fighter who moves from the jungle to Bogotá after the signing of the Peace Treaty. It is Netflix's first Colombian original series. (Note: Green Frontier was the first Colombian series commissioned by Netflix, but Distrito Salvaje was streamed first on the service since Green Frontier premiered in August 2019.)

== Cast ==
- Juan Pablo Raba as Jhon Jeiver "Yei Yei" / Jhon Gómez
- Nicolás Quiroga Pineda as Mario Gómez (Jhon Jeiver's son)
- Cristina Umaña as Daniela León
- Susana Torrez as Carmen Caicedo
- Camila Sodi as Gissele Duque
- Carolina Acevedo as Alex Mallarino
- Christian Tappan as Apache
- Juan Fernando Sánchez as Caldera
- Juan Sebastián Calero as Raúl/Aníbal
- Julio Pachón as Coronel Rama
- Alina Lozano as Francisca, the mother of Jhon Jeiver
- Paula Castaño as Verónica
- Camila Jurado as Juliana
- Camilo Jiménez Varón as Senator Federico Ibargüen
- Walter Díaz as Saúl
- Andrés Toro as Ramón
- Jennifer Hyde as Julie
- Estefanía Piñeres as Stefany Arbelo
- Nina Caicedo as Misury
- Juan Pablo Urrego as Edilson
- Roberto Cano as Senator Edgar Santos
- Ed Hughes as Paul
- Sebastián Eslava as Mérida
- Helena Mallarino as Clara
- Andrés Londoño as Nicolas Gamero

== Episodes ==
Season	Episodes	Originally released
1	10	October 19, 2018
2	10	November 8, 2019

=== Season 1 (2018) ===
No. overall	No. in season	Title	Directed by	Written by	Original release date
1	1	"Coacción"	Javier Fuentes Leon	Cristian Conti, Javier Gullón	October 19, 2018
2	2	"Infiltración"	Javier Fuentes Leon	Javier Fuentes-León, Cristian Conti	October 19, 2018
3	3	"Intimidación"	Javier Fuentes Leon	Mauricio Leiva Cock	October 19, 2018
4	4	"Soborno"	Carlos Moreno	Cristian Conti	October 19, 2018
5	5	"Robo"	Carlos Moreno	Cristian Conti	October 19, 2018
6	6	"Allanamiento"	Carlos Moreno	Mauricio Leiva Cock, Cristian Conti	October 19, 2018
7	7	"Decepción"	Carlos Moreno	Cristian Conti	October 19, 2018
8	8	"Traición"	Javier Fuentes Leon	Javier Fuentes León	October 19, 2018
9	9	"Ejecución"	Javier Fuentes Leon	Javier Gullón	October 19, 2018
10	10	"Juicio"	Javier Fuentes Leon	Cristian Conti	October 19, 2018

=== Season 2 (2019) ===
No. overall	No. in season	Title	Directed by	Written by	Original release date
11	1	"El Distrito"	Carlos Moreno	Unknown	November 8, 2019
12	2	"La Fosa"	Carlos Moreni	Unknown	November 8, 2019
13	3	"La Trocha"	Carlos Moreno	Esteban Orozco, Cristian Conti	November 8, 2019
14	4	"El Barrio"	Andres Beltran	Unknown	November 8, 2019
15	5	"La Colmena"	Andres Beltran	Unknown	November 8, 2019
16	6	"La Ratonera"	Andres Beltran	Unknown	November 8, 2019
17	7	"Las Calles"	Andres Beltran	Unknown	November 8, 2019
18	8	"El Callejón"	Carlos Moreno	Unknown	November 8, 2019
19	9	"La Comuna"	Carlos Moreno	Unknown	November 8, 2019
20	10	"El Laberinto"	Carlos Moreno	Unknown	November 8, 2019
