= Lila's Book =

2017 animated film

- Spanish: El libro de Lila
- Directed by: Marcela Rincón González
- Screenplay by: Marcela Rincón González
- Produced by: Maritza Rincón González
- Music by: Juan Andrés Otálora
- Production companies: Fosfenos Media; Palero Estudio
- Release dates: 21 September 2017 (Sala Zitarrosa); 28 September 2017 (Colombia)
- Running time: 76 minutes
- Countries: Colombia; Uruguay
- Language: Spanish
- Box office: $1.9 million

Lila's Book (Spanish: El libro de Lila) is a 2017 Colombian-Uruguayan animated fantasy adventure film written and directed by Marcela Rincón González, and produced by sister Maritza Rincón González. Produced by their Fosfenos Media and Palero Estudio, Lila's Book was the first animated feature film in Colombia to be directed by a woman. It was released in Colombian cinemas on 28 September 2017.

== Premise ==
Lila, a character from a children's book, suddenly gets outside of her paper world, becoming trapped in the real world. She soon figures that Ramón, the boy who used to read the book she was in years ago, is the only one who can save her. However, Ramón has grown up and stopped reading, and Lila will have to convince him to believe in fantasy again.

== Voice cast ==
The voice cast is as follows:

- María Sofía Montoya as Lila
- Antoine Philippard as Ramón
- Estefanía Duque, Estefy Hengja as Manuela
- Leonor Gonzalez Mina as Guardiana de la Selva
- Jorge Herrera as Sañor del Olvido

== Production ==
Marcela Rincón González was inspired to create the film after reading Michael Ende's 1979 novel The Neverending Story. Marcela wondered what happens to literacy characters if nobody reads the book in which they are in. She wrote the script over a period of three years, while Fosfenos Media produced live-action projects and their first animated television show Guillermina and Candelario. Film production took four years to complete; the first year in pre-production, followed by two years of production, and another year of post-production. The film was a collaboration with Uruguayans Federico Ivanier and Alfredo Soderguit from Palermo Estudio, who aided in improving the story and visual designs in the early development stages. In total, the production team comprised some 160 individuals.

== Release ==
Lila's Book was released in Colombian cinemas on 28 September 2017. The film was lauded by critics, with particular praise for its strong female charterers, story, representation and environmental messages. Throughout early 2018, it was shown prominently at several film festivals to positive reception.
