= La sargento Matacho =

- Film poster
- Directed by: William González
- Written by: Marco Antonio Lopez
- Screenplay by: Marco Antonio Lopez; William González; Matilde Rodriguez
- Story by: Pedro Claver Téllez
- Produced by: Carlos Alperin; Sergio Ivan Dominguez; Roham Ghodsi; Alina Hleap; Diana Zuleta
- Starring: Fabiana Medina; Damián Alcázar; Marlon Moreno; Juan Pablo Franco; Carlos Vergara; Juan Pablo Barragán
- Cinematography: Martín Boege
- Edited by: Sigfrido Barjau
- Music by: Alejandro Ramirez-Rojas
- Production companies: ENIC Producciones; Galloping Illusions; HD Cinema
- Release date: October 2015 (Colombia)
- Running time: 93 minutes

La sargento Matacho is a 2015 Colombian drama film directed by William Gonzalez, who also co-wrote the screenplay, and starring Fabiana Medina, Damián Alcázar, Marlon Moreno and Juan Pablo Barragán. It is inspired by historical events such as La Violencia.

The film was shown on October 11, 2017 at the 7º Almeria Western Film Festival.

== Cast ==
- Fabiana Medina as Rosalba Velasco
- Damián Alcázar as Feliciano Pachón
- Marlon Moreno as Comandante Richard
- Juan Pablo Barragán as Desquite
- Juan Pablo Franco as Sgt. Huelgos
- Carlos Vergara as Hernando
- Jaime Cabal as Padre Leoncio
- John Alex Castillo as Cpt. Roque
- Rubén Darío Forero as Avenegra
- Dagoberto Gama as Comandante Duarte
- María González as Tránsito
- Diego Landaeta as Martirio
- Sebastián Lemus as Antonio
- Carolina Millán as Olguita
- Marco Antonio Ocampo as Inocencio León
- José Manuel Rodríguez as Teniente Largacha
- Olga Lucía Ruíz as Amalia
- Gabriel Uribe as Roberto
