= The Dragon Defense =

2017 film

- Film poster
- Directed by: Natalia Santa
- Written by: Natalia Santa
- Produced by: Ivette Liang
- Cinematography: Nicolas Ordonez, Ivan Herrera
- Edited by: Juan Soto
- Music by: Gonzalo de Sagarminaga
- Release date: 24 May 2017 (Cannes)
- Running time: 79 minutes
- Country: Colombia
- Language: Spanish

The Dragon Defense (Spanish: La defensa del dragón) is a 2017 Colombian drama film directed by Natalia Santa. The Spanish-language film was screened in the Directors' Fortnight section at the 2017 Cannes Film Festival.

== Cast ==
- Gonzalo de Sagarminaga
- Hernan Mendez
- Manuel Navarro
- Victoria Hernandez
- Maia Landaburu
- Martha Leal
- Ashlee Tejedor
- Laura Osma
