= Power Paola =

Colombian-Ecuadorian cartoonist

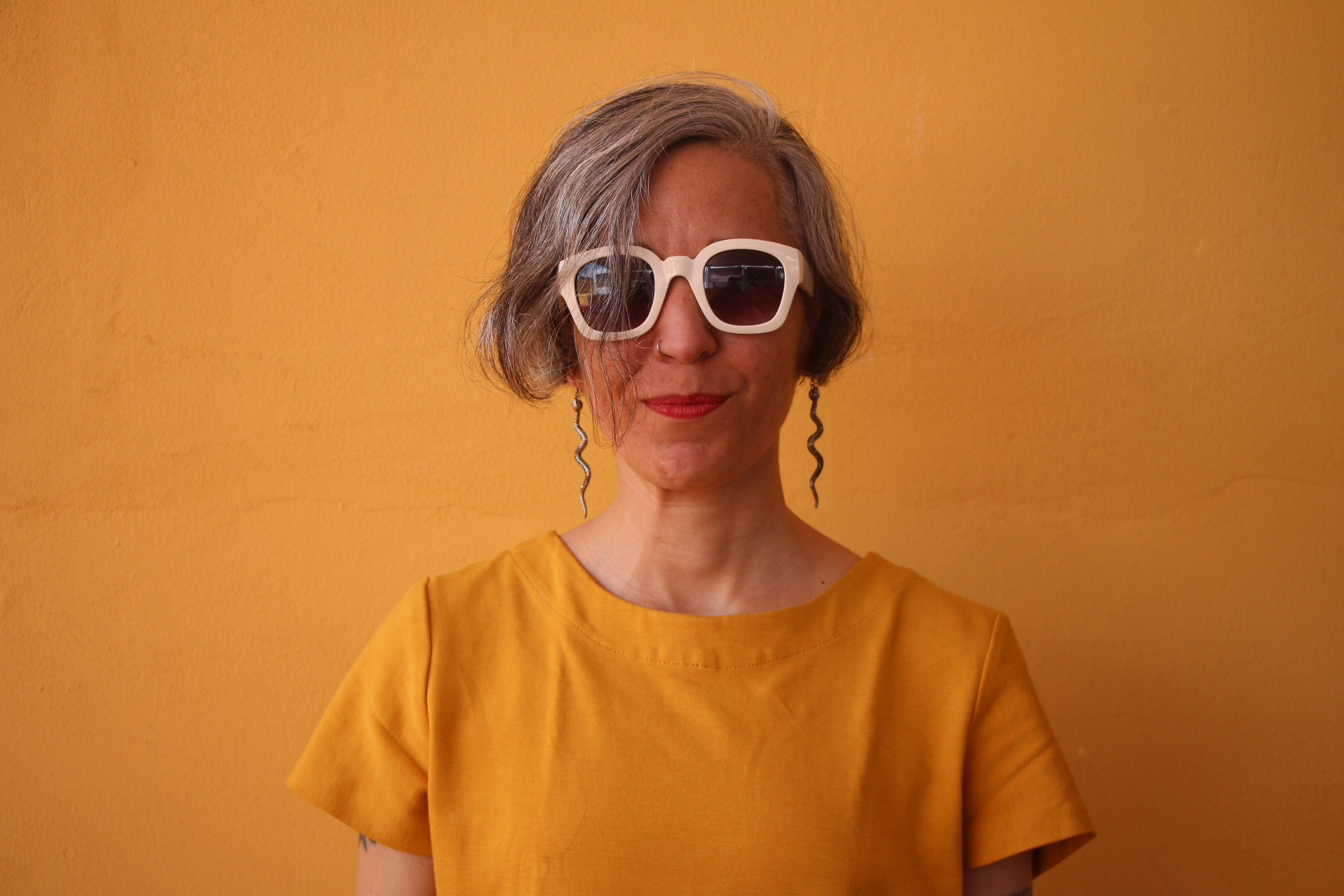
- Power Paola in Querétaro, México, 2016.
- Born: Paola Andrea Gaviria Silguero; June 20, 1977 (age 49) Quito, Ecuador
- Areas: Cartoonist, Writer
- Notable works: Virus Tropical; Todo Va a Estar Bien; Diario

Power Paola (born Paola Andrea Gaviria Silguero; June 20, 1977) is a Colombian-Ecuadorian cartoonist. She is the author of graphic memoirs Virus Tropical (2011), Por Dentro (2012), Diario (2013), qp (2014), Todo Va a Estar Bien (2015) and Nos vamos (2016). Her work deals with themes of sexuality, feminism, family, and personal identity.

She is a member of the international comics collective Chicks on Comics.

== Biography ==
=== Early life ===
Paola Gaviria, known by the pen name Power Paola, was born in Quito, Ecuador. During her mother's pregnancy, a doctor insisted that she was not pregnant but was the victim of a "tropical virus." Her family moved to Cali, Colombia when she was 13, and she studied at the Fundación Universitaria de Bellas Artes in Medellin, where she cofounded the art collective Taller 7. She describes herself as a "nomad" and has since lived in Sydney, Paris, San Salvador, and Bogota, though she now lives in Buenos Aires.

=== Comics ===
Power Paola initially worked as painter, then started reading the work of comics artists like Marjane Satrapi and Julie Doucet. She started drawing comics at age 27, to entertain herself and document her life while working in a kitchen in Sydney. She initially self-published her comics on Flickr and as print zines. In 2011, Argentinian publisher Editorial Comun published her memoir Virus Tropical, which tells the story of Paola's childhood growing up as a rebellious daughter in a conservative Colombian family dominated by strong women. The book was met with critical praise and republished in English and French by Random House / Mondadori. Critics have noted her loose drawing style and intimate voice, and her "characters favors caricature over quasi-photorealism." Of Virus Tropical, reviewer said, "Using a strongly expressive naïve style, Paola creates a very personal comic, with a clear feminine voice, that is a standard bearer of the comic of those latitudes." Reviewer Abril Castillo Cabrera compared reading the book to visiting a therapist, writing that Power Paola creates "an atmosphere that we can access, a story with a beginning and a closing, an elaboration of her life and a bridge that tends to the lives of others who read it."

Her work was shown at Fundacion PROA in Buenos Aires as part of the Chicks on Comics exhibition "Long Distance Relationship" in 2017.

Virus Tropical became a movie in 2017.

== Bibliography ==
- Virus Tropical (2010) ISBN 9789872457891, OCLC 798340878
  - English translation Virus Tropical (2016) ISBN 9781937541231, OCLC 923554440
- Por Dentro (2012) ISBN 9789588568232, OCLC 857585649
- Diario de Power Paola (2013) ISBN 9789872787516, OCLC 883407717
- QP, 2004–2012 (2014) ISBN 9789588568362, OCLC 883125654
- Todo Va a Estar Bien (2015) ISBN 9789588568492, OCLC 913076208
- Nos vamos (2016) ISBN 9789588568577, OCLC 982083695
