= Natalia Santa =

Colombian director (born 1977)

- Born: Natalia Santa Carrillo; 1977 (age 47–48); Bogotá, Colombia
- Education: National University of Colombia
- Occupations: Director; screenwriter
- Years active: 2002–present

Natalia Santa Carrillo (born 1977) is a Colombian director and screenwriter. She is best known for writing and directing the 2017 drama film The Dragon Defense.

== Early life ==
Santa was born in Bogotá. Both of her parents worked in television; her mother, Fabiola Carrillo, is also a screenwriter. She studied literature at the National University of Colombia and worked in various publishing houses, including Alfaguara. After studying English in the United States, she began working on television scripts with her mother.

== Career ==
In 2016, she and Kiran Fernández founded a production company, Perro de Monte. Her debut feature film, The Dragon Defense, premiered in the Directors' Fortnight section of the 2017 Cannes Film Festival, making her the first Colombian female director to participate in an official section of the Cannes Film Festival. Her second feature film, Malta, premiered at South by Southwest in 2024. She co-wrote the upcoming Netflix series One Hundred Years of Solitude, based on the 1967 novel of the same name by Gabriel García Márquez.

== Filmography ==
=== Film ===
Year	Title	Director	Writer
2017	The Dragon Defense	Yes	Yes
2024	Malta	Yes	Yes

=== Television ===
Year	Title	Director	Writer	Notes
2009	Summer in Venice	No	Yes	151 episodes
2013	Plaza Sésamo	No	Yes	1 episode
2019	Crime Diaries: Night Out	No	Yes	2 episodes
2019	Green Frontier	No	Yes	2 episodes
2020	Ruido Capital	No	Yes	3 episodes
2020	The Great Heist	No	Yes	2 episodes
2024	One Hundred Years of Solitude	No	Yes	

== Awards and nominations ==
Award	Year	Category	Nominated work	Result	Ref.
Platino Awards	2025	Best Series Creator	One Hundred Years of Solitude	Nominated	
