= Fénix Awards =

Ibero-American annual film award ceremony

- Awarded for: Merits of Ibero-American film productions
- Country: Mexico
- Presented by: Cinema23
- First award: 2014

The Fénix Awards (Spanish: Premios Fénix) were an annual ceremony of awards celebrated in Mexico City and presented by the association Cinema23 recognising excellence in the Ibero-American film industry. They were delivered from 2014 to 2018.

== History ==
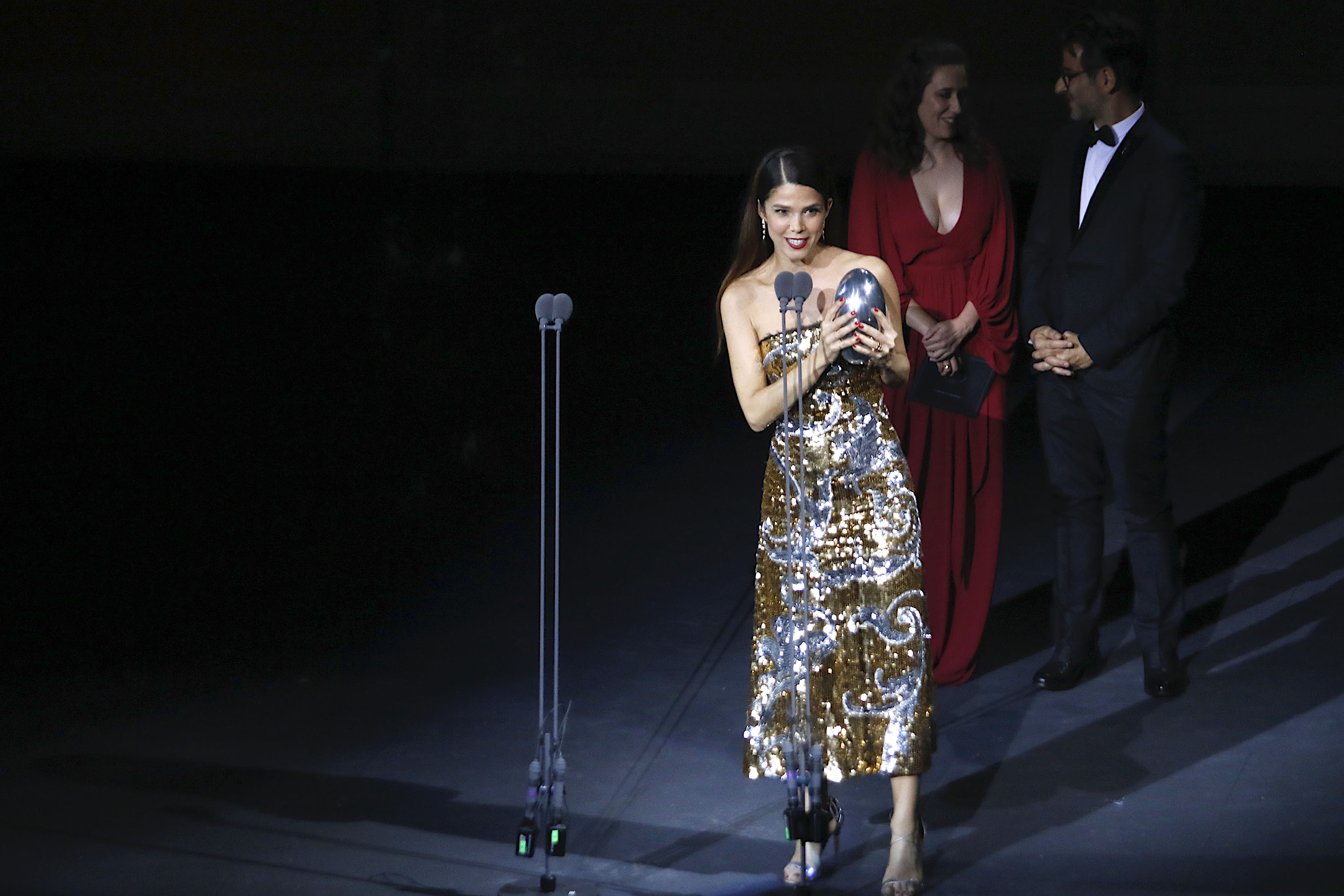
Juana Acosta holding the egg-like trophy at the 2018 awards

Presented by the association Cinema23 (created in turn in 2012), the awards were created in 2014 to honor works in the Ibero-American film industry. The first ceremony took place in October 2014 in Mexico City, only some months after the celebration of the 1st Platino Awards (with the same Ibero-American scope) in Panama City.

The statuette was designed by Brazilian artist Artur Lescher.

In 2019, reportedly due to "budget" constraints and in the wake of unsuccessful negotiations with the Government of Mexico City, the presenter reported the indefinite (but "not definitive") cancellation of the awards and parallel events after 5 ceremonies, bemoaning a lack of enough support from both the national and local incoming governments.

== Editions ==
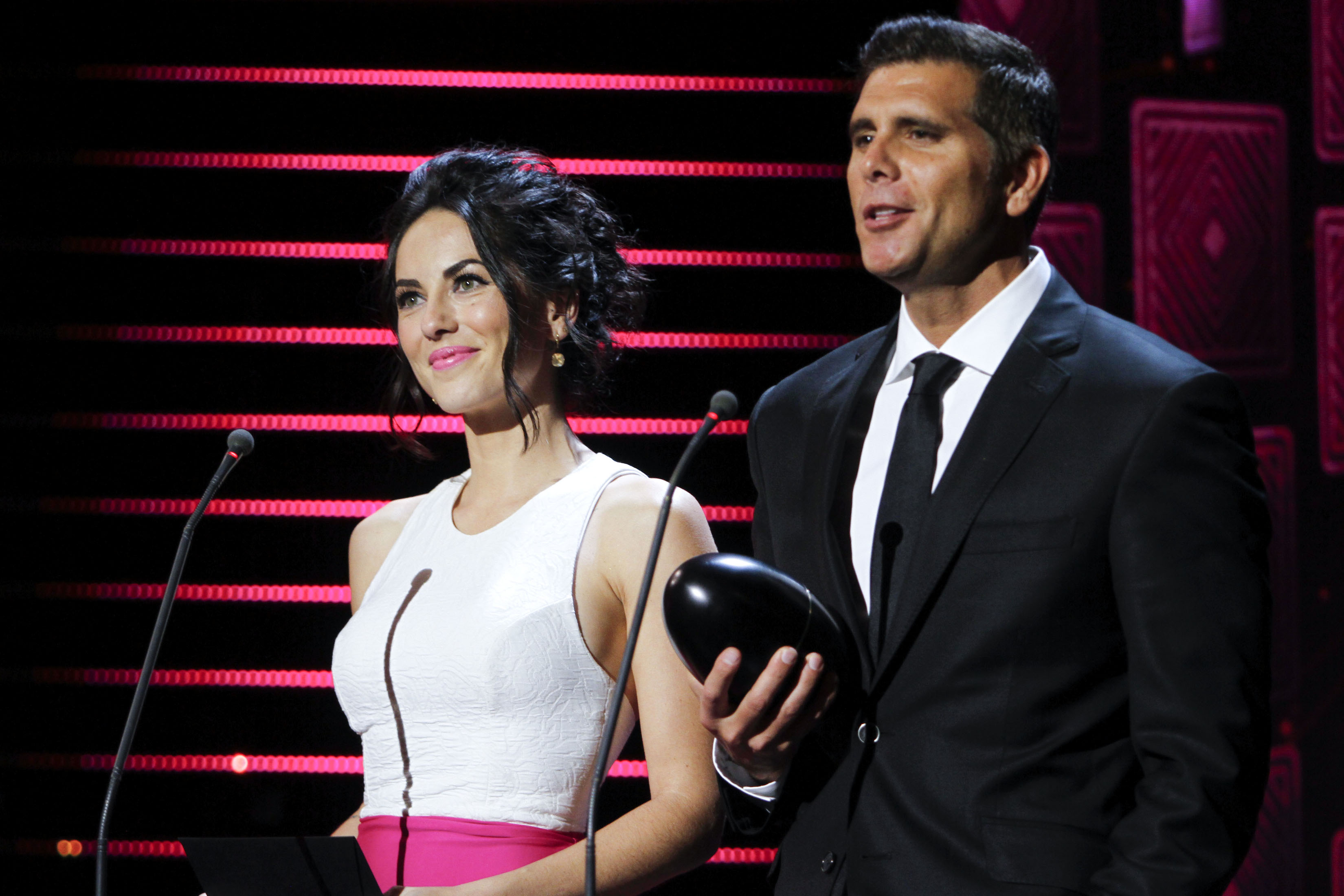
Christian Meier and Bárbara Mori at the 2015 Fénix Awards.

- 1st Fénix Awards (Teatro de la Ciudad, 30 October 2014)
- 2nd Fénix Awards (Teatro de la Ciudad Esperanza Iris, 25 November 2015)
- 3rd Fénix Awards (Teatro de la Ciudad Esperanza Iris, 7 December 2016)
- 4th Fénix Awards (6 December 2017)
- 5th Fénix Awards (Teatro de la Ciudad Esperanza Iris, 7 November 2018)

== See also ==
- Platino Awards
