= Birds of Passage (film) =

2018 film by Cristina Gallego and Ciro Guerra

- Colombian theatrical release poster
- Original title: Pájaros de verano
- Directed by: Cristina Gallego; Ciro Guerra
- Written by: Maria Camila Arias; Jacques Toulemonde Vidal
- Produced by: Katrin Pors; Cristina Gallego
- Starring: Carmiña Martínez; José Acosta; Natalia Reyes; Jhon Narváez; Greider Meza; Jose Vicente Cotes; Juan Bautista
- Cinematography: David Gallego
- Edited by: Miguel Schverdfinger
- Music by: Leonardo Heiblum
- Production companies: Ciudad Lunar; Blond Indian; Pimienta Films; Snowglobe; Films Boutique; Bord Cadre Film
- Distributed by: Cine Colombia (Colombia); Interior13 (Mexico); Diaphana Distribution (France); Øst for Paradis (Denmark); MFA+ Filmdistribution (Germany)
- Release dates: 9 May 2018 (Cannes); 2 August 2018 (Colombia); 13 December 2018 (Mexico); 21 February 2019 (Denmark); 4 April 2019 (Germany); 10 April 2019 (France)
- Running time: 125 minutes
- Countries: Colombia; Denmark; Mexico; Germany; France
- Languages: Wayuu; Spanish; English; Wiwa
- Box office: $2.5 million

Birds of Passage (Spanish: Pájaros de verano, lit. 'Summer Birds') is a 2018 epic crime film directed by Cristina Gallego and Ciro Guerra.

The film explores the rise of a Wayuu man and his family as they enter the drug trade, prosper, and slowly lose their traditions and former way of life.

It was selected to open the 50th edition of the Directors' Fortnight section at the 2018 Cannes Film Festival. The film was also selected as the Colombian entry for the Best Foreign Language Film at the 91st Academy Awards, making the December shortlist.

== Plot ==
In the late 1960s, Zaida (Natalia Reyes), a young Wayuu woman, comes of age. She meets Rapayet (José Acosta) who proposes to marry her. Zaida comes from the influential Pushaina family and her mother, Ursula, sets her dowry high.

Rapayet comes across white American Peace Corps volunteers desperate for marijuana. Rapayet and his friend Moisés go to Rapayet's cousin, Gabriel, who grows marijuana. Impressed by their product, one of the Americans offers Rapayet a business deal exporting the drugs. With the money from the trade, Rapayet is able to pay Zaida's dowry in full, though Ursula disapproves of his dealings with foreigners.

A few years later, Rapayet is happily married to Zaida, with the export business having grown into a large-scale operation. Moisés urges Rapayet to expand the business and work with other growers, but Rapayet stays loyal to Gabriel. During a handoff, Rapayet realizes the Americans he is working with are dealing with others. Moisés kills two of the men, only to be stopped from killing a third when Rapayet threatens him. The Pushaina family urges Rapayet to kill Moisés in retribution for the blood he has spilled. However, in deference to their friendship, Rapayet instead tells Moisés he is no longer welcome in the business. Moisés and his men kill Gabriel and his family in retaliation, and Rapayet is forced to kill Moisés. With the Pushaina family backing him, he strikes a new deal with Gabriel's brother, Anibal, but for a higher fee.

By the end of the 1970s, Rapayet and his family are enjoying a prosperous life and are invited to attend Gabriel's second burial. In spite of Ursula's reluctance, the entire family attends. Leonidas, Ursula's youngest son who has grown up knowing only extravagant wealth, drunkenly tries to seduce Anibal's daughter, and later forces one of her bodyguards to eat dog feces in exchange for money. As retribution, Anibal demands that Leonidas work in his fields. Although Ursula urges Rapayet not to comply, Zaida urges him to, hoping to avoid war. While staying in Anibal's compound, Leonidas rapes his daughter, triggering a feud between the clans.

Once again trying to avoid war, Rapayet sends a word messenger offering Anibal his entire business. Anibal kills the word messenger, signifying a total break with Wayuu tradition. Rapayet, Zaida and their children flee. The murder causes other Wayuu clans to send their word messengers to Ursula, who is shocked when most are willing to turn their backs on her family, believing they have lost their traditions and are no longer Wayuu. Ursula is forced to give up the sacred objects belonging to her family. Using the strength of the other families, Ursula kidnaps her daughter and grandchildren and warns Rapayet not to return.

Anibal's compound is destroyed and his men are killed. He uses the last of his money to hire mercenaries to decimate Rapayet's compound, leaving only Ursula and Zaida's daughter Indira alive. Ursula urges Indira to run away with Leonidas, but finding him drunk and nearly dead, she is forced to go on alone. Ursula gives up what remains of her business, and Rapayet's location, to Anibal, in exchange for her grandson's body. Anibal tracks down Rapayet and murders him, vowing to also kill Leonidas.

== Cast ==
- Carmiña Martínez as Úrsula
- Natalia Reyes as Zaida
- José Acosta as Rapayet
- Jhon Narváez as Moisés
- Jose Vicente Cotes as Peregrino, Rapayet's uncle
- Juan Bautista as Aníbal
- Greider Meza as Leonidas

== Production ==
Production for the film took ten years with writer-directors Cristina Gallego and Ciro Guerra becoming interested in the Wayuu people while filming The Wind Journeys which Guerra wrote and directed and Gallego produced. The filmmakers based the film on real stories they heard during this research phase and incorporated members of the community into their production. According to the directors about 30% of the cast and crew was made up of local Wayuu people.

The film marks the directorial debut of Gallego who had previously worked as a producer and decided to co-direct the film in order to add a female perspective as women are valued in Wayuu culture and were also a part of the drug trade in the 1970s.

In addition to their longtime producing and direction partnership Gallego and Guerra were also married. They divorced amicably during the production of the film.

== Reception ==
=== Box office ===
Birds of Passage grossed $507,259 in the United States and Canada, and $2 million in other territories, for a worldwide total of $2.5 million, making it the most successful Spanish-language Colombian film since Embrace of the Serpent (2016) by the same director.

=== Critical response ===
On the review aggregator website Rotten Tomatoes, the film holds an approval rating of 96% based on 168 reviews, with an average rating of 7.9/10. The website's critics consensus reads, "Birds of Passage traces the familiar arc of the drug crime thriller from a different direction that's as visually absorbing as it is hard-hitting." Metacritic, which uses a weighted average, assigned the film a score of 86 out of 100, based on 24 critics, indicating "universal acclaim".

Some critics have compared it favourably to other crime saga films like The Godfather, Scarface and the television series The Sopranos. IndieWire's Eric Kohn awarded the film a B+ rating, calling it "another fascinating tone poem about Colombia’s fractured identity". Jordan Hoffman of The Guardian gave a positive review of the film, writing "in the most reductive way, it is another mafia story. But as with their previous film (Embrace of the Serpent), it is the specificity that counts, and while certain genre tendencies prevent the narrative from truly unmooring, hardly a scene goes by without something fundamentally familiar being rendered in a unique fashion".

Variety's Peter Debruge wrote that "few films have captured quite so powerfully the tension between the old and new worlds — a feat “Birds of Passage” accomplishes while simultaneously allowing audiences to channel the Wayuu’s surrealistic view of their surroundings, where spirits walk the earth, and wise women interpret their dreams". Jessica Kiang of The Playlist stated the film was "wildly alive, yet it reminds us that no matter how modern we are, there are ancient songs our forebears knew whose melodies still rush in our blood". About the Wayuu people depicted here she wrote: "the Wayuu here are neither exploited innocents nor backward savages, but flawed humans indulging recognisable human instincts of greed and rapaciousness... You do not have to have Wayuu ancestry, or any connection to the region to understand the broader implications of this epic story of haunted druglords and ruthless power grabs that are partly predicated on traditional beliefs and shibboleths".

Former United States President Barack Obama named Birds of Passage among his favorite films and television series of 2019 in his annual list of favorite films, which he released on Twitter on 29 December 2019.

=== Accolades ===
Year	Award	Category	Nominee(s)	Result	Ref.
2019	61st Ariel Awards	Best Ibero-American Film	Birds of Passage	Won	
2019	36th Miami Film Festival	Knight Marimbas Award	Cristina Gallego and Ciro Guerra	Won	

== See also ==
- List of submissions to the 91st Academy Awards for Best Foreign Language Film
- List of Colombian submissions for the Academy Award for Best Foreign Language Film
