= Laura Mora =

Colombian director (born 1981)

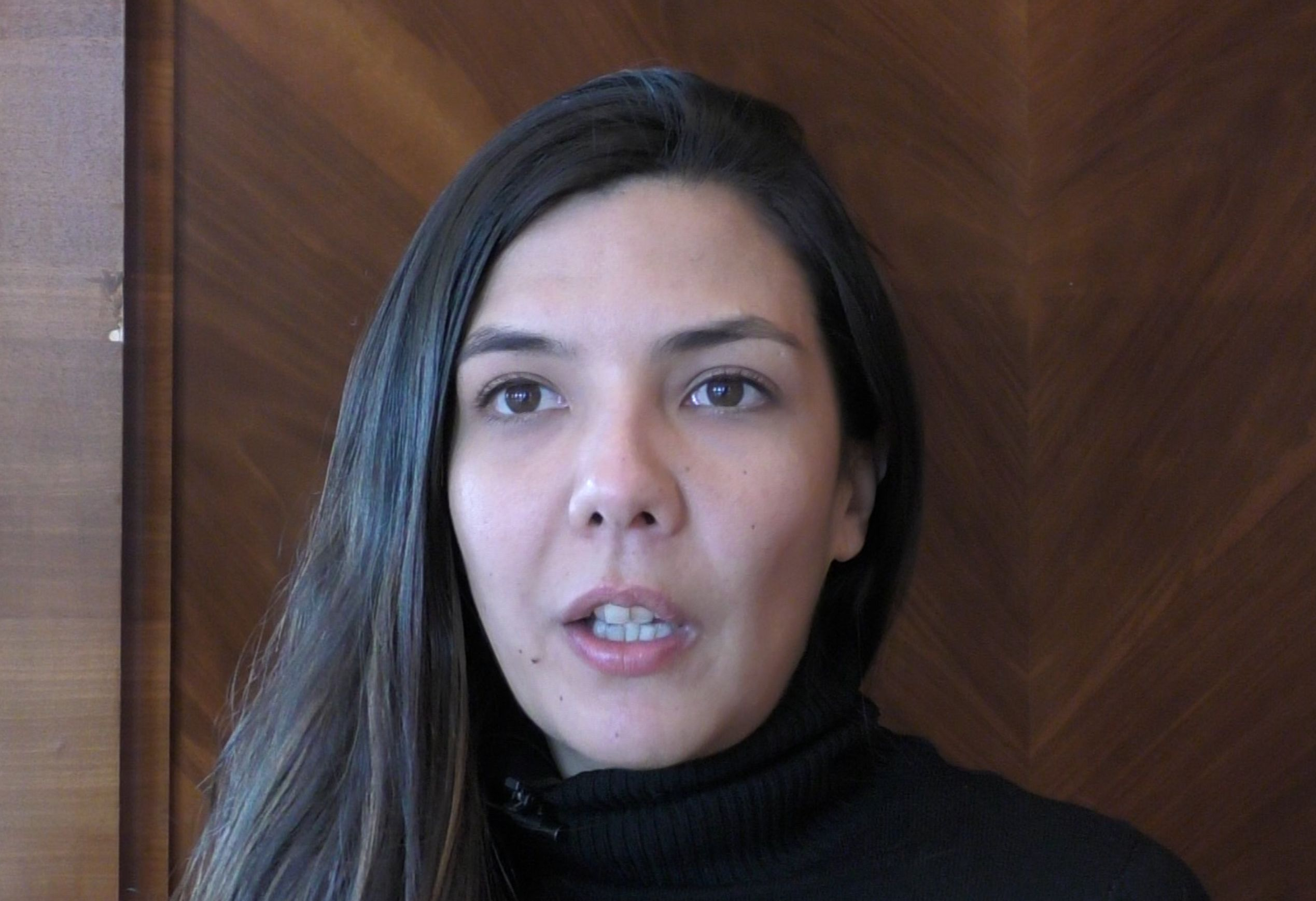
- Mora in 2017
- Born: Laura Mora Ortega; 1981 (age 44–45); Medellín, Colombia
- Education: Royal Melbourne Institute of Technology
- Occupations: Director; screenwriter
- Years active: 2006–present

Laura Mora Ortega (born 1981) is a Colombian director and screenwriter. She is best known for writing and directing the films Killing Jesus (2017) and The Kings of the World (2022), the latter of which won the Golden Shell at the 70th San Sebastián International Film Festival.

== Early life ==
Mora was born in Medellín. Her grandfather was one of the founders of the Medellín Metropolitan Theatre. She developed a love for film after watching Rodrigo D: No Future at the age of 13.

Her father, a lawyer, was killed by a hitman in 2002. Following his death, Mora moved to Australia to study film at the Royal Melbourne Institute of Technology.

== Career ==
In 2012, she co-directed the television series Pablo Escobar, The Drug Lord. She directed her debut feature film, Killing Jesus, in March 2016.

Her 2022 film, The Kings of the World, won the Golden Shell at the 70th San Sebastián International Film Festival. It was also selected as Colombia's submission for Best International Feature Film at the 95th Academy Awards. She co-directed the Netflix series One Hundred Years of Solitude, based on the novel of the same name by Gabriel García Márquez.

== Filmography ==
=== Film ===
Year	Title	Director	Writer
2015	Antes del fuego	Yes	No
2016	Código Origen	Yes	No
2017	Killing Jesus	Yes	Yes
2022	The Kings of the World	Yes	Yes

=== Television ===
Year	Title	Director	Writer	Notes
2012	Pablo Escobar, The Drug Lord	Yes	No	83 episodes
2015	Los hombres también lloran	Yes	No	31 episodes
2019	Green Frontier	Yes	No	4 episodes
2024–2026	One Hundred Years of Solitude	Yes	No	7 episodes

== Awards and nominations ==
Award	Year	Category	Nominated work	Result	Ref.
Ariel Awards	2023	Best Ibero-American Film	The Kings of the World	Nominated	
Cairo International Film Festival	2017	Golden Pyramid	Killing Jesus	Nominated	
Cairo International Film Festival	2017	Silver Pyramid	Killing Jesus	Won	
Cairo International Film Festival	2017	FIPRESCI Prize	Killing Jesus	Won	
Cartagena Film Festival	2018	Audience Award	Killing Jesus	Won	
Cartagena Film Festival	2018	Colombian Cinema Award	Killing Jesus	Nominated	
Chicago International Film Festival	2017	Gold Hugo	Killing Jesus	Nominated	
Chicago International Film Festival	2017	Roger Ebert Award	Killing Jesus	Won	
Chicago International Film Festival	2022	Gold Hugo	The Kings of the World	Nominated	
Chlotrudis Awards	2024	Best Director	The Kings of the World	Nominated	
Fénix Awards	2018	Best Director	Killing Jesus	Nominated	
Fénix Awards	2018	Best Screenplay	Killing Jesus	Won	
Films from the South	2022	Silver Mirror	The Kings of the World	Nominated	
Gasparilla International Film Festival	2018	Best International Feature	Killing Jesus	Won	
Huelva Ibero-American Film Festival	2017	Best New Director	Killing Jesus	Nominated	
Macondo Awards	2018	Best Film	Killing Jesus	Won	
Macondo Awards	2018	Best Director	Killing Jesus	Won	
Macondo Awards	2018	Best Screenplay	Killing Jesus	Won	
Macondo Awards	2023	Best Director	The Kings of the World	Won	
Macondo Awards	2023	Best Screenplay	The Kings of the World	Nominated	
Motovun Film Festival	2018	Best Film	Killing Jesus	Won	
Munich Film Festival	2023	Best International Film	The Kings of the World	Nominated	
Palm Springs International Film Festival	2018	New Voices/New Visions Grand Jury Prize	Killing Jesus	Nominated	
Palm Springs International Film Festival	2018	Cine Latino Award	Killing Jesus	Won	
San Sebastián International Film Festival	2017	New Directors Award	Killing Jesus	Nominated	
San Sebastián International Film Festival	2017	SIGNIS Award	Killing Jesus	Nominated	
San Sebastián International Film Festival	2017	EROKSI Youth Award	Killing Jesus	Won	
San Sebastián International Film Festival	2017	Fedeora Award	Killing Jesus	Won	
San Sebastián International Film Festival	2022	Golden Shell	The Kings of the World	Won	
San Sebastián International Film Festival	2022	Feroz Zinemaldia Award	The Kings of the World	Won	
San Sebastián International Film Festival	2022	SIGNIS Award	The Kings of the World	Won	
Seattle International Film Festival	2018	Ibero American Competition	Killing Jesus	Nominated	
Warsaw Film Festival	2017	Best Film	Killing Jesus	Nominated	
Warsaw Film Festival	2022	Crème de la Crème Award	The Kings of the World	Won	
Zurich Film Festival	2017	Best International Feature Film	Killing Jesus	Nominated	
Zurich Film Festival	2022	Best International Feature Film	The Kings of the World	Won	
