= Wandering Shadows =

2004 film

- Directed by: Ciro Guerra
- Written by: Ciro Guerra
- Produced by: Jaime Osorio Gómez; Alejandro Prieto; Diego Hernandez; Jemay Herrera
- Starring: César Badillo; Ignacio Prieto; Inés Prieto
- Cinematography: Emanuel Rojas
- Edited by: Iván Wild
- Music by: Richard Córdoba
- Production companies: Ciudad Lunar Producciones; Proyecto Tucán; Tucán Producciones
- Distributed by: KMBO
- Release date: 22 September 2004
- Running time: 91 minutes
- Country: Colombia
- Language: Spanish

Wandering Shadows (Spanish: La sombra del caminante) is a 2004 Colombian drama film directed by Ciro Guerra. The film was selected as the Colombian entry for the Best Foreign Language Film at the 78th Academy Awards, but was not accepted as a nominee.

== Plot ==
Mañe is a man in a tough economic situation. He has lost a leg and as a result is stuck in unemployment, he does not have money for the lease and is the victim of jokes and abuse by the young people of his community. As he wanders in Bogota's streets looking for a source of income, he meets a strange and illiterate man, who is dedicated to carrying people on his back, on a chair, through the downtown. Due to the way they can help each other, they engage in a curious friendship that makes their lives more bearable and allows them to share their personal problems. But both of them share a violent past as a product of the armed conflict. This past unites them and at the same time separates them, as men who have lost everything, except the hope of a new beginning.

== See also ==
- List of submissions to the 78th Academy Awards for Best Foreign Language Film
- List of Colombian submissions for the Academy Award for Best Foreign Language Film
