= Ciro Guerra =

Colombian film director

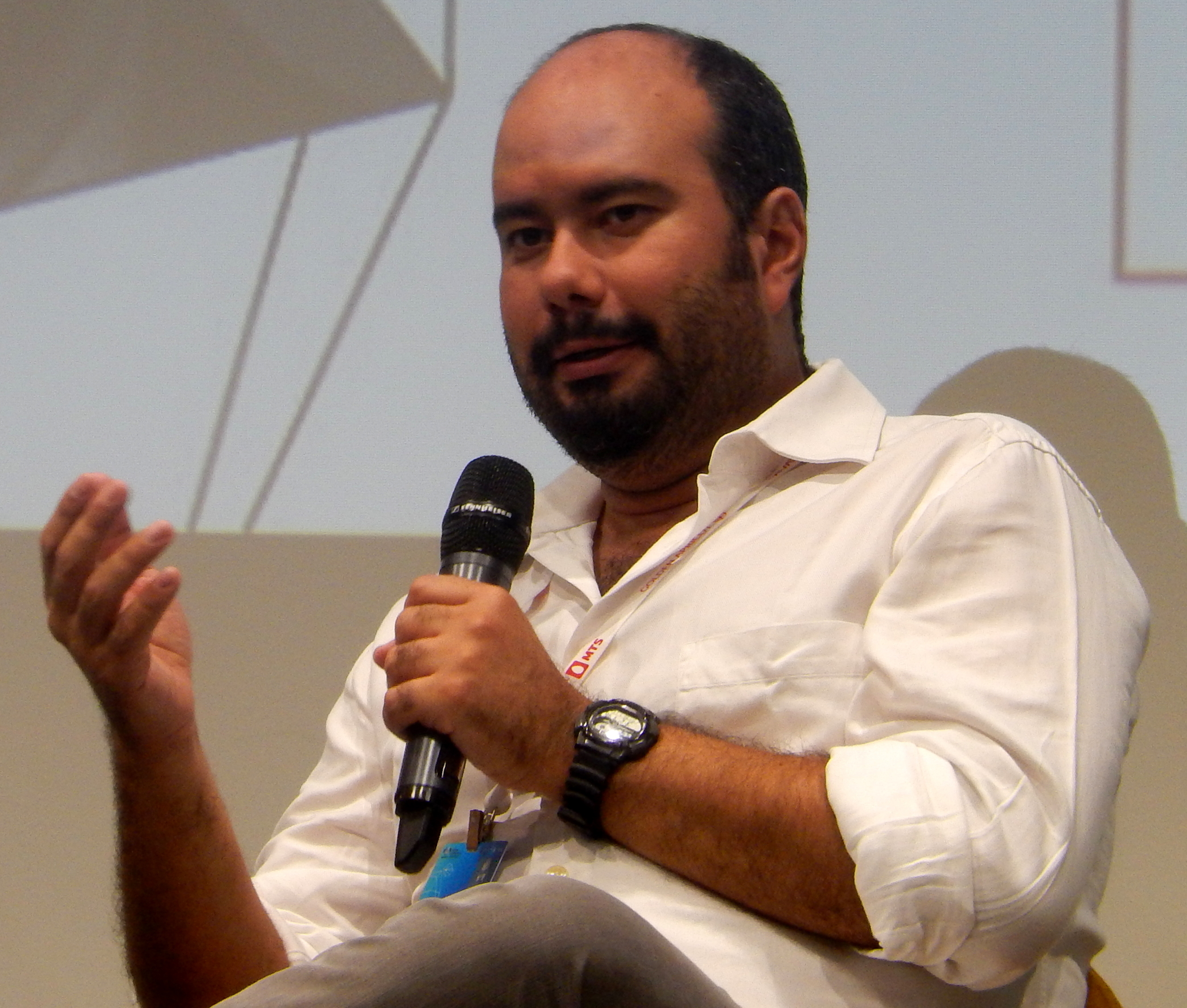
- Guerra in 2017
- Born: 6 February 1981 (age 45); Río de Oro, Colombia
- Occupations: Film director Screenwriter
- Years active: 1998–present

Ciro Guerra (born 6 February 1981) is a Colombian film director and screenwriter. He is best known for his 2015 film Embrace of the Serpent, which was nominated for Best Foreign Language Film at the 88th Academy Awards, and for The Wind Journeys, selected as the Colombian entry for the Best Foreign Language Film at the 82nd Academy Awards.

== Career ==
He made his first film, Wandering Shadows, in 2004 at the age of 23. The film was selected as Colombian submission for Best Foreign Language Film at the 78th Academy Awards, but it was not nominated. His next film, The Wind Journeys, competed in the Un Certain Regard section at the 2009 Cannes Film Festival and was selected as Colombian submission for Best Foreign Language Film at the 82nd Academy Awards; it also was not selected.

His 2015 film Embrace of the Serpent was screened in the Directors' Fortnight section at the 2015 Cannes Film Festival, where it won the C.I.C.A.E. Award. It won the Best Film award in the International Film Festivals of Odesa and Lima, where it also received a special prize from the Critics Jury. The film was also among the nominees for Best Foreign Language Film at the 88th Academy Awards, being the first Colombian film ever to be nominated.

On 22 November 2017, Netflix ordered the limited series Green Frontier to production. Green Frontier is based on an original idea from Diego Ramírez Schrempp and Jenny Ceballos of Dynamo Producciones. Guerra is credited as an executive producer of the series, alongside, Diego Ramírez Schrempp, Andrés Calderón, Jorge Dorado and Cristian Conti. The series was directed by Guerra, Laura Mora Ortega and Jacques Toulemonde Vidal and written by Mauricio Leiva-Cock, Antón Goenechea, Camila Brugrés, Gibrán Portela, Javier Peñalosa, María Camila Arias, Natalia Santa and Nicolás Serrano. The miniseries premiered on Netflix on 16 August 2019.

In 2018, Guerra released his fourth feature film, Birds of Passage, which was filmed in La Guajira Desert, Colombia. Guerra states that it is "like a gangster film, but something completely different from any gangster film that you have ever seen".

Guerra has also directed an adaptation of J. M. Coetzee's novel Waiting for the Barbarians, starring Mark Rylance, Johnny Depp, Robert Pattinson, Gana Bayarsaikhan, and Greta Scacchi. The film premiered at the Venice Film Festival on 6 September 2019, and was released on 7 August 2020, by Samuel Goldwyn Films.

He was the jury president of the International Critics' Week section of the 2019 Cannes Film Festival.

== Personal life ==
Guerra was married to his longtime producer Cristina Gallego. The couple divorced during the filming of Birds of Passage, which they co-directed.

In 2020, Spanish-speaking feminist periodical Volcánicas published the story of eight women in the film industry accusing Guerra of sexual harassment. Guerra denied the accusations and vowed to pursue legal action against those who had made them. In May 2021, a court in Bogotá, Colombia, ruled in favour of Guerra and ordered the magazine to rectify its report, as their claims lacked detail and evidence. In response, in the same month, Volcánicas published more details and new accusations in their investigation. After a legal battle, the Constitutional Court of Colombia overruled and revoked all previous decisions, denying Guerra's pretensions (thus confirming the journalists' right to free speech).

== Filmography ==
Year	Film	Credited as		
Year	Film	Director	Writer	Notes
1998	Silence	Yes		Short.
1999	Documental siniestro: Jairo Pinilla, cineasta	Yes		Documentary.
2000	Alma	Yes	Yes	Short.
2001	Intento	Yes	Yes	Animated short film.
2004	Wandering Shadows	Yes	Yes	
2009	The Wind Journeys	Yes	Yes	
2015	Embrace of the Serpent	Yes	Yes	
2018	Birds of Passage	Yes		Co-directed with Cristina Gallego.
2019	Green Frontier	Yes		Netflix mini-series. Executive producer.
2019	Waiting for the Barbarians	Yes		

== Awards and nominations ==
Year	Nominated work	Association	Category	Result
2003	Wandering Shadows	San Sebastián International Film Festival	Films in Progress Award	Won
2009	The Wind Journeys	Cannes Film Festival	Award of the City of Rome	Won
2009	The Wind Journeys	Cannes Film Festival	Un Certain Regard Award	Nominated
2015	Embrace of the Serpent	Mar del Plata International Film Festival	Golden Ástor	Won
2016	Embrace of the Serpent	Academy Awards	Best Foreign Language Film	Nominated
2016	Embrace of the Serpent	Durban International Film Festival	Best Direction	Won
2016	Embrace of the Serpent	Independent Spirit Awards	Best International Film	Nominated
2016	Embrace of the Serpent	Platino Awards	Best Director	Won
2016	Embrace of the Serpent	Platino Awards	Best Screenplay	Nominated

=== Accolades ===
- 2021 - Jury member at 52nd International Film Festival of India, Goa.
