= The Wind Journeys =

2009 film by Ciro Guerra

- Theatrical release poster
- Directed by: Ciro Guerra
- Written by: Ciro Guerra
- Produced by: Diana Bustamante; Cristina Gallego
- Starring: Marciano Martínez; Yull Núñez
- Cinematography: Paulo Andrés Pérez
- Edited by: Iván Wild
- Music by: Iván Ocampo
- Production companies: Ciudad Lunar Producciones; World Cinema Fund; ZDF arte Razor Films; Cine Ojo; Voya Films
- Distributed by: Cineplex
- Release date: 1 April 2009
- Running time: 117 minutes
- Countries: Colombia; Germany; Netherlands; Argentina
- Languages: Spanish; Palenquero; Wayuu; Arhuaco

The Wind Journeys (Spanish: Los viajes del viento) is a 2009 Colombian-German-Argentine-Dutch drama film written and directed by Ciro Guerra. It was filmed in 80 locations in Northern Colombia and is spoken in Spanish, Palenquero, Wayuunaiki, and Ikun. It was selected as the Colombian entry for the Best Foreign Language Film at the 82nd Academy Awards, but was not nominated.

== Plot ==
The film follows the travels of vallenato musician Ignacio Carrillo (portrayed by real-life musician Marciano Martínez) who is followed by Fermín, a young boy who wants to be his apprentice, in a journey to return his instrument to his original owner, the man who once was his mentor.

Ignacio Carrillo is a vallenato musician from Majagual (Sucre), who decides, after his wife's sudden death, to stop playing and return his accordion to his former master. It is said that the instrument is cursed after Guerra, the former master, won a duel with the devil. He is joined by Fermín Morales (Yull Núñez), a teenage boy who admires Ignacio and wishes to become a juglar like him. Carrillo reluctantly accepts, given his loneliness. In 1968, on an Ash Wednesday, Carrillo, Morales and their donkey start a journey through several towns in the Caribbean region in Northern Colombia, to Taroa (a small caserío in La Guajira Desert) where Carrillo's master supposedly lives. During their journey, Carrillo participates in the first version of the Vallenato Legend Festival in Valledupar.

== Cast ==
- Marciano Martínez as Ignacio Carrillo
- Yull Núñez as Fermín Morales
- Agustín Nieves as Ninz
- José Luis Torres as Meyo

== Production ==
Guerra had the idea to make the film after an introduction meeting for students when he began to study films in the National University of Colombia. "A boy stood up and said: My name is John Doe, I'm x years old and I hate the vallenato. And people applauded him.". He decided then to demonstrate that the vallenato is more than "commercial music that is heard in the buses of the cities and that generates prevention in people".

Guerra sees vallenato as an important cultural component pointing out "If there is the American imaginary of the western and the Chinese imaginary of the fantastic genre of martial arts, here is one very rich in vallenato".

The protagonists of the film had no experience as actors before the production, so they received a year of preparation for the making of the film. According to Guerra, it was easy to find people willing to participate in the production, with the exception of the Arawak of the Sierra Nevada de Santa Marta, who were a more reserved community so it took a year's effort to persuade them.

It was filmed in 80 locations in Northern Colombia and is spoken in Spanish, Palenquero, Wayuunaiki, and Ikun.

== Release ==
The film was released on 30 April 2009 as part of the Vallenato Legend Festival.

== Reception ==
=== Critical response ===
The film received positive reviews from critics. Justin Chang of Variety gave a positive review of the film. He summarized his review saying: "The rugged majesty of the Colombian landscape forms a spectacular widescreen backdrop for a simple, bittersweet tale of regret and companionship in "The Wind Journeys." David Sterritt of TCM wrote: "Extremely high praise is due to the widescreen color cinematography by Paulo Andrés Pérez, which captures a sweeping array of locations... in images brimming with atmosphere." He also praised the music by Iván Ocampo, saying that his "... original score is also crucial to the movie's effectiveness". As noted by Ana Cecilia Calle in her review for Austin Film Society, the film makes references to the legendary figure of Francisco the Man, of whom it is said beat the devil in a contest and is mentioned in Gabriel García Márquez's One Hundred Years of Solitude. She also wrote: "The film sharply points out ways music connected people and territories in rural northern Colombia in the late 1960s... The film's quest of returning the accordion is an homage to such communities..." Like others, she praised the cinematography saying: "Guerra's careful cinematography offers both a tempting dish and also a challenge for the audience: panoramic shots, long silences, short dialogues, crisp, wide ambient sound. These elements allow us to lose ourselves in a sensorial experience that can also question our traditional cinematic ideas about time."

=== Awards ===
The Wind Journeys was chosen to participate in the Un Certain Regard section at the 2009 Cannes Film Festival. There it won the Award of the City of Rome.

The film also won the awards of Best Colombian Film and Best Director at 2009 Bogotá Film Festival and Best Colombian Film and Best Director at 2010 Cartagena Film Festival. The film won the Best Spanish Language Film award at 2010 Santa Barbara International Film Festival.

== See also ==
- List of submissions to the 82nd Academy Awards for Best Foreign Language Film
- List of Colombian submissions for the Academy Award for Best Foreign Language Film
