= Robledo Puch =

Argentine serial killer (born 1952)

Carlos Robledo Puch
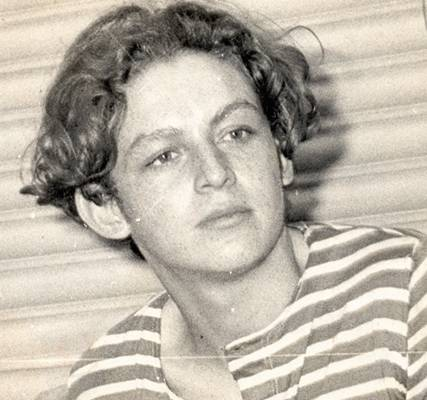
- Robledo Puch after being captured (1972)
- Born: Carlos Eduardo Robledo Puch; 19 January 1952 (age 74); Buenos Aires, Argentina
- Status: Incarcerated
- Other names: Carlitos; The Angel; The Death Angel; The Black Angel
- Parent(s): Víctor Robledo Puch; Josefa Aída Habendak
- Convictions: Aggravated murder (x11); Attempted murder (x1); Sexual crimes (x3); Kidnapping (x2); Armed robbery (x17); Theft (x2)
- Penalty: Life imprisonment (plus accessory of indeterminate reclusion) (Note: Under Article 52 of the Argentine penal code, Robledo Puch received the harshest sentence under Argentine law, in which a defendant can be remanded in custody for the rest of their lives.)

Details
- Victims: 11 known
- Span of crimes: 1971–1972
- Country: Argentina
- Date apprehended: 4 February 1972

Carlos Eduardo Robledo Puch (born 19 January 1952), also known as The Angel of Death and The Black Angel, is an Argentine serial killer. He was convicted of at least eleven murders (including the killing of at least one accomplice), one attempted murder, seventeen robberies, involvement in one rape and one attempted rape, one count of sexual abuse, two kidnappings, and two thefts. Most of the offenses occurred in the northern area of Greater Buenos Aires. Robledo Puch hated Argentine society at the time and began his criminal career in 1971, until his arrest in 1972.

== Early life and initial legal encounters ==
Robledo Puch was born on 19 January 1952 to Víctor Robledo Puch, a former technician for General Motors, and Josefa Aída Habendak, a housewife who had emigrated from Germany shortly after World War II. His family descends from Dionisio Puch, a soldier who was governor of the Salta Province, and Martín Miguel de Güemes, a military leader who defended the nation during the War of Independence.

In 1956, when Robledo Puch was four years old, his parents moved the family to Borges Street, Olivos, Buenos Aires Province, where they rented a first-floor apartment above a hardware store. Coming from a hard-working, middle-class family, Puch was known to be shy and quiet like his mother, who took great care of him. Growing up, Puch studied piano and learned German during his childhood. He is also an avid football fan and supports River Plate.

He had troubled school years, where he usually stole items from his classmates. In 1967, Puch was caught stealing money from the secretary's office and was expelled from school. Puch, who was a victim of bullying at school, had a difficult relationship with his father. After his arrest for the serial killings, Puch's grandmother died suddenly and his mother attempted suicide. His father allegedly blamed Puch for these incidents, which Puch never forgave. Shortly after his capture, Puch threatened his father via letter, telling him that he would kill him the day he was freed. His father eventually divorced Puch's mother and was expelled from his job due to ostracization for his son's actions.

In December 1968, Puch had his first legal encounter when he entered the workshop of a man who worked with bicycles and stole a motorcycle. After being arrested for this robbery, Puch confessed to more than 14 thefts. He was sent to a reformatory, where he spent twenty days under the order of a juvenile court judge. Towards the end of 1969 or early 1970, Puch met Jorge Antonio Ibáñez, who became his accomplice in many robberies and murders. In early 1971, Puch and Ibáñez committed at least four robberies, stealing millions of pesos and spending them on luxurious items for themselves. They were arrested in January 1971 for one of these crimes and were charged with felonies. Puch was released shortly afterwards but was ordered to present himself for a court appearance. Puch and Ibáñez, who had also been released on bail, escaped to Mar del Plata on train.

== Serial killings and arrest ==
Puch's first documented murder occurred on 3 May 1971, when Puch and Ibáñez entered an auto repair shop in Vicente López around midnight, in northern Greater Buenos Aires. Puch shot and killed the shop's owner. He then seriously injured and sexually assaulted his wife, who survived along with her 10-month-old baby daughter. Before fleeing with AR$400,000 in cash, Puch shot towards the baby's cradle, failing in his attempt to shoot her. Puch and Ibáñez killed again 11 days later on 14 May 1971, when they broke into a nightclub in Olivos. There, Puch and Ibáñez stole more than two million pesos in cash from the storage room. Before fleeing, Puch saw an opened door to a small room. When he peered inside, he saw two men sleeping (the watchmen). Puch immediately opened fire, killing them both. Ten days later, on 24 May 1971, Puch and Ibáñez entered a supermarket in Vicente López. Once inside, Puch shot and killed the 61-year-old watchman. He then stole more than five million pesos and drank a whole bottle of whiskey with Ibáñez at the crime scene as a celebration for their success.

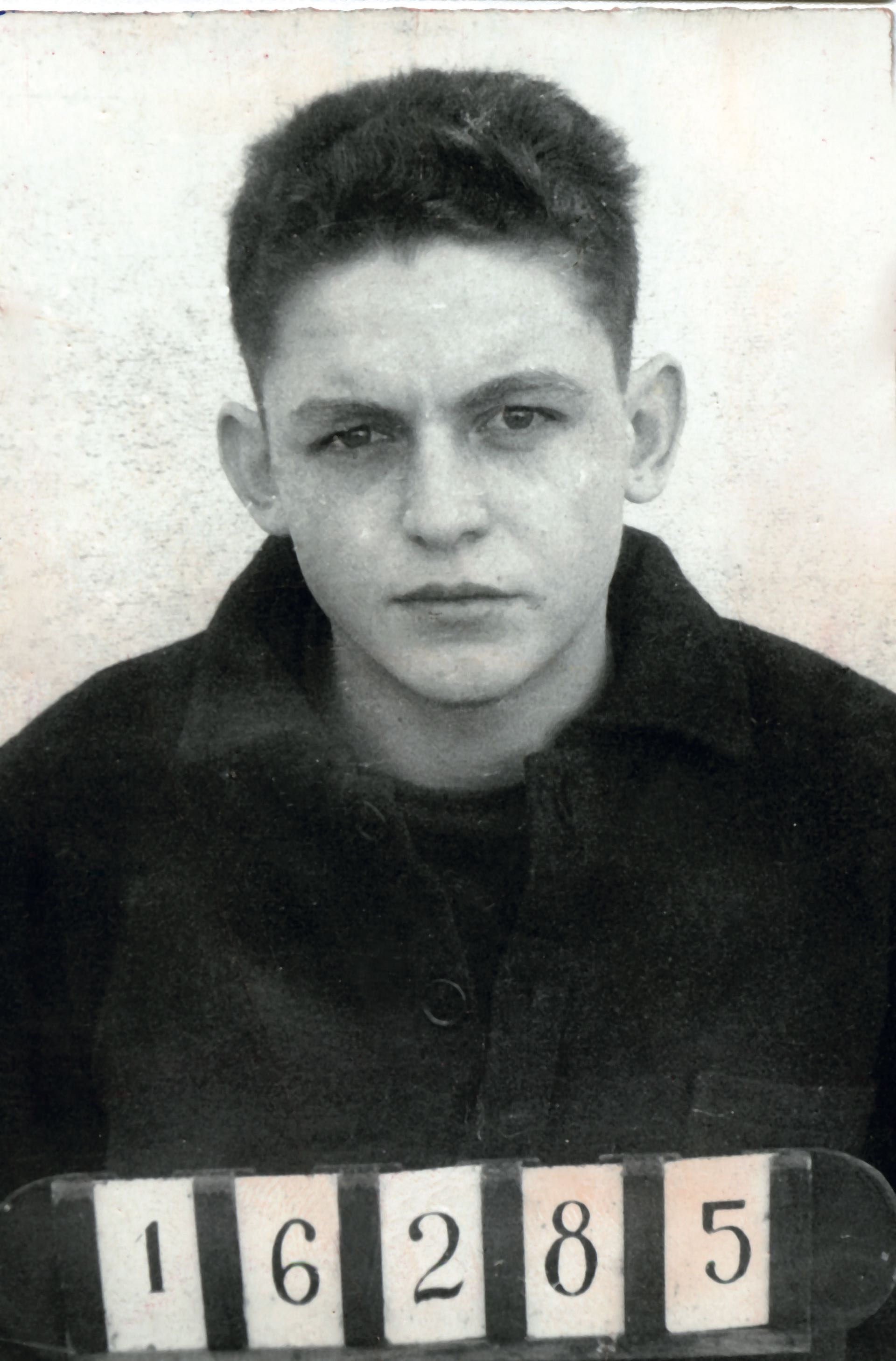
Mugshot of Robledo Puch (1973)

On 13 June 1971, Puch and Ibáñez kidnapped a 16-year-old girl from a Buenos Aires highway. The girl, who had been involved in street prostitution, was forced into Puch's car at gunpoint. After driving away to a secluded area, Ibáñez sexually assaulted the girl and then ordered her out of the car. Puch told the girl to walk without looking backwards and shot her five times, killing her. It is unclear whether Puch also participated in the sexual assault. Puch murdered another female on 24 June 1971, when, along with Ibáñez, they kidnapped a 22-year-old woman who had just left her boyfriend's house near the site where the 16-year-old girl had been murdered. Puch and Ibáñez drove the woman to another secluded area, where Ibáñez attempted to rape her. It is also unclear whether Puch took part in this sexual assault. Ibáñez then ordered the woman to exit the car and Puch followed her, shooting her multiple times in the back, killing her.

On 5 August 1971, Puch's accomplice Ibáñez died in a confusing car accident that occurred while Puch was driving. Later rumors alleged that Puch could have killed Ibáñez and staged the accident as an alibi for Ibáñez's murder. As a result, Puch looked for another accomplice, finally acquainting himself with Héctor Somoza. They committed their first crime together on 15 November 1971 when they entered a supermarket in the northern area of Greater Buenos Aires. Puch and Somoza did not take anything as Puch was surprised by the 50-year-old watchman, whom he killed by shooting him multiple times. Two days later, on 17 November 1971, Puch and Somoza broke into an auto agency and stole AR$90,000 in cash. Before fleeing, Puch shot and killed the sleeping watchman, who had raised his concerns in regards to the deaths of other watchmen in the area. At that point police began to suspect serial murders. Puch's last murder in 1971 occurred on 25 November, when, along with Somoza, he broke into a Dodge agency. Puch and Somoza stole 1.5 million pesos. Before escaping, Puch took the watchman to the second floor of the agency and shot him three times, killing the man.

Puch committed his last murder on 3 February 1972, when, along with Somoza, he broke into a hardware store in Tigre, Buenos Aires. Once inside the store, Puch encountered the watchman and, at gunpoint, locked the man up inside a small room. Minutes later, Puch returned, opened the door, and killed the man with two gunshots. After the watchman was murdered, Puch and Somoza tried to open the safe vault. In a confusing incident, Somoza grabbed Puch, which Puch interpreted as an attempt to kill him. Puch then took his handgun and shot Somoza, killing him. Puch tried to cover up Somoza's identity by burning his face and hands with a blowtorch. Puch then escaped with some cash but forgot that Somoza had his (Puch's) identification card in his pockets, which would eventually lead to Puch's arrest.

Puch was arrested on 4 February 1972, after Puch's identity card was found in Somoza's pants pocket, which made the police interview his family, who said that he had been with Puch lately. He had just turned 20.

== Trial ==
Puch's trial began more than eight years after his arrest, on 4 August 1980, where Puch faced 36 charges, including eleven counts of aggravated murder. Puch blamed his first accomplice Ibáñez for many of the crimes and stood defiant in court, where he referred to the whole process as a "farce." The trial extended for four months, where 92 witnesses accused Puch of committing the crimes. Prior and during the process, a forensic psychiatrist named Osvaldo Raffo, determined that Puch was a psychopath who represented a threat to society. Puch, who met with Raffo over 25 times during the evaluations, later accused Raffo of lying and gaining fame at his expense.

On 27 November 1980, the trial concluded with a unanimous verdict from the three presiding judges. Robledo Puch was sentenced to life imprisonment with the accessory of "indeterminate reclusion"; the maximum possible sentence under Argentine law. After the verdict was read, Puch delivered his last words to the court saying: "This was a Roman circus. I was judged and sentenced beforehand."

Robledo Puch later denied his involvement in the murders he was accused of, saying he was tortured and coerced into a confession. He did not deny any of the thefts he was accused of. The only survivor (eyewitness), who did not appear or testify in court for health reasons, said that the man who had raped and shot her had long hair, which indicated Ibáñez. Robledo Puch had short curly hair.

== Parole applications and incarceration ==
On 7 July 1973, Puch briefly escaped from prison, only to be recaptured three days later in downtown Buenos Aires. His mother, who appeared in the media defending her son and denying that he had committed the murders, was confronted by an angry reporter who asked her if she believed in her son's innocence. Puch's mother responded that she knew that her son "had done some things [...] but not all of them."

In April 2017, Puch told reporter Rodolfo Palacios that in 1982 he sent a personal letter to then facto leader Leopoldo Galtieri and offered to volunteer as a soldier in the Falklands War. Puch never received a response from Galtieri.

In July 2000, Puch became eligible for parole; he did not submit a petition.

In 2003, Puch was briefly transferred to a psychiatric hospital, where he was evaluated after he dressed as Batman and set fire to the workshop of the prison where he was serving his sentence in Olavarría. After being found competent, he was returned to prison. In 2007 he was transferred to another prison in Azul, Buenos Aires.

On 27 May 2008, Puch submitted a petition of request to be paroled. The judge who reviewed his petition denied him parole considering him to still be a threat to society.

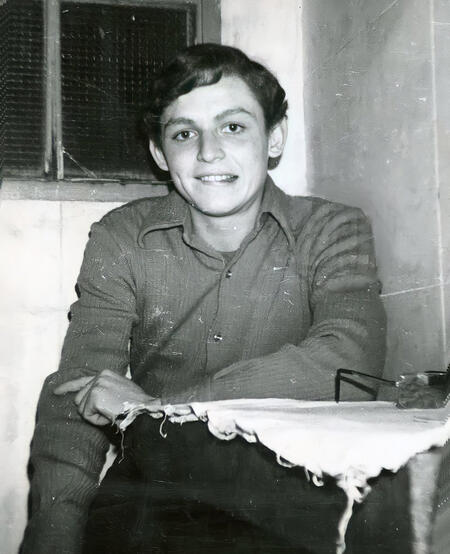
Robledo Puch in prison (1973)

In November 2013, he requested a review of his sentence or, failing that, his execution by lethal injection, even though the death penalty was not legal in Argentina. The Supreme Court of Justice denied both the request for review and the request for execution, the latter of which would have been illegal.

On 27 March 2015, the Supreme Court of Justice rejected an appeal filed by Robledo Puch against the aforementioned judicial decision whereby he was denied parole.

In May 2019, Puch was rushed to a hospital from prison after he showed signs of intoxication related to side effects of a medication aimed at treating depression.

In March 2023, during an interview with América 24, Puch denied his crimes and blamed others for them. Puch said that he was "constantly suffering" in prison and that he wished to be "euthanized." Puch has a history of demanding that he be executed (even though the death penalty is not a legal punishment in Argentina), including in 2013, when he asked to be executed via lethal injection if his parole application was denied.

In June 2023, judge Oscar Roberto Quintana of the Court of Guarantees and Appeals, turned down his parole request once again, citing that Puch suffers from "inconsistent emotions [...] which could be expressed in an erratic way," adding that Puch also has "paranoid reflections." Judge Quintana also rejected the transfer to a nursing home, saying that Puch refuses psychiatric treatment, and that he has not worked since 1992.

In November 2024, judge Quintana offered Puch the possibility of having more relaxed prison conditions, which included going outside the penitentiary for a few hours. However, Puch rejected the proposal, saying that he was "used to living in prison".

In March 2025, Puch gave another interview, where he asked once more to be executed via lethal injection.

As of 2026, Robledo Puch has spent over 54 years in prison, making him the longest-serving prisoner in South America.

== Psychological profile ==
Robledo Puch has been extensively evaluated over the years. In November 2024, mental health professionals issued a profile of Puch to judge Quintana, who had to decide whether to grant Puch full parole (which was later denied based on the evaluation). The psychologists found Puch as suffering from a psychopathic personality disorder, with a significant omnipotence of narcissism, as well as exacerbated self-value, lack of empathy, large amounts of rage, emotional superficiality, impulsivity, absence of introspection, repressed emotionality, megalomaniac ideation, paranoia and lack of self-control.

In October 2018, Puch was evaluated to determine his prison conditions. Mental health professionals, which included a psychiatrist and a psychologist specialized in cognitive behavioral therapy, determined that Puch denies responsibility for his crimes, only confessing to his robberies. They also found Puch to be "psychopathic, manipulating, cruel and perverse", as well as a person who constantly refers to God to justify his current situation, and to continue to hold others responsible for his problems, including the attempted suicide of his mother, which he blamed on reporters.

== Victims ==
#	Name	Age	Date of murder
1	Manuel Godoy	23	15 March 1971
2	Félix Pedro Mastronardi	35	15 March 1971
3	José Bianchi	29	3 May 1971
4	Juan Scattone	21	24 May 1971
5	Virginia Eleuteria Rodríguez	16	13 June 1971
6	Ana María Dinardo	23	24 June 1971
7	Raúl Del Bene	50	15 November 1971
8	Juan Carlos Rozas	65	17 November 1971
9	Bienvenido Serapio Ferrini	62	25 November 1971
10	Manuel Acevedo	58	3 February 1972
11	Héctor Somoza (accomplice)	17	3 February 1972

== See also ==
- List of serial killers by country
- List of serial killers by number of victims
- Cayetano Santos Godino
- Mateo Banks
