= Killing Jesus (2017 film) =

2017 film

- Film poster
- Directed by: Laura Mora
- Written by: Laura Mora
- Starring: Natasha Jaramillo
- Cinematography: James L. Brown
- Music by: Sebastián Escofet
- Release dates: 8 September 2017 (TIFF); 1 March 2018 (Colombia)
- Running time: 95 minutes
- Countries: Colombia; Argentina
- Language: Spanish

Killing Jesus (Spanish: Matar a Jesús) is a 2017 Colombian-Argentine crime thriller drama film written and directed by Laura Mora.

== Plot ==
The film tells the story of a photographer whose father is killed by an assassin, whom she later gets to know. The story is based on the biography of Laura Mora whose father was killed in Medellín. Both leading roles are played by amateur actors.

== Cast ==
- Natasha Jaramillo as Paula 'Lita'
- Giovanny Rodríguez as Jesús
- Camilo Escobar as Jose Maria
- Carmenza Cossio as Alicia

== Recognition ==
In August 2018, it was one of four films shortlisted to be the Colombian entry for the Best Foreign Language Film at the 91st Academy Awards.
