= 5th Platino Awards =

2018 Ibero-American film awards

- Date: April 29, 2018
- Site: Teatro Gran Tlachco in Riviera Maya, Mexico
- Hosted by: Eugenio Derbez

Highlights
- Best Film: A Fantastic Woman
- Best Actor: Alfredo Castro
- Best Actress: Daniela Vega
- Most awards: A Fantastic Woman (5)
- Most nominations: A Fantastic Woman (9)

Television coverage
- Network: TNT Latin America

The 5th Platino Awards was presented at Gran Tlachco Theater in Riviera Maya, Mexico, on April 29, 2018, to honor the best in Ibero-American films of 2017. The ceremony was televised in Latin America by TNT, and hosted by actor Eugenio Derbez.

A Fantastic Woman received the most nominations with nine.

== Winners and nominees ==
The winners and nominees are listed as follows:

=== Film ===
| Best Ibero-American Film: A Fantastic Woman; Last Days in Havana; The Bookshop; The Summit; Zama | Best Director: Sebastián Lelio — A Fantastic Woman; Álex de la Iglesia — Perfect Strangers; Fernando Pérez — Last Days in Havana; Isabel Coixet — The Bookshop; Lucrecia Martel — Zama |
| Best Actor: Alfredo Castro — Los perros; Daniel Giménez Cacho — Zama; Javier Bardem — Loving Pablo; Javier Gutiérrez — The Motive; Jorge Martínez — Last Days in Havana | Best Actress: Daniela Vega — A Fantastic Woman; Antonia Zegers — Los perros; Emma Suárez — April's Daughter; Maribel Verdú — Abracadabra; Sofía Gala — Alanis |
| Best Screenplay: Sebastián Lelio, Gonzalo Maza — A Fantastic Woman; Carla Simón — Summer 1993; Fernando Pérez, Abel Rodríguez — Last Days in Havana; Isabel Coixet — The Bookshop; Lucrecia Martel — Zama | Best Original Score: Alberto Iglesias — The Summit; Alfonso Vilallonga — The Bookshop; Derlis A. González — The Gold Seekers; Juan Antonio Leyva, Magda Rosa Galbán — On the Roof; Plínio Profeta — O Filme da Minha Vida |
| Best Animated Film: Tad Jones: The Hero Returns; Deep; História Antes de Uma História; Lila's Book; Lino: Uma Aventura de Sete Vidas | Best Documentary: Lots of Kids, a Monkey and a Castle; Adriana's Pact; Dancing Beethoven; Memory Exercises; The Grown-Ups |
| Best Cinematography: Rui Poças — Zama; Benjamín Echazarreta — A Fantastic Woman; Javier Julia — The Summit; Raúl Pérez Ureta — Last Days in Havana; Santiago Racaj — Summer 1993 | Best Art Direction: Renata Pinheiro — Zama; Estefanía Larraín — A Fantastic Woman; Mikel Serrano — Giant; Mónica Bernuy — Summer 1993; Sebastián Orgambide, Micaela Saeigh — The Summit |
| Best Editing: Soledad Salfate — A Fantastic Woman; Ana Pfaff, Dídac Palou — Summer 1993; Etienne Boussac — The Animal's Wife; Miguel Schverdfinger, Karen Harley — Zama; Rodolfo Barros — Last Days in Havana | Best Sound: Guido Berenblum — Zama; Aitor Berenguer, Gabriel Gutiérrez, Nicolás de Poulpiquet — Veronica; Sergio Bürmann, David Rodríguez, Nicolás de Poulpiquet — The Bar; Sheyla Pool — Last Days in Havana; Tina Laschke — A Fantastic Woman |
| Best Ibero-American First Film: Summer 1993; Bad Influence; Holy Camp!; On the Roof; The Desert Bride; The Dragon Defense | Cinema and Education in Values: Giant; Just Like Our Parents; The Animal's Wife; Bad Influence; A Fantastic Woman |

=== Television ===
Best Ibero-American Miniseries or TV series: The Ministry of Time; Cable Girls; El maestro; Un gallo para Esculapio; Velvet Collection
| Best Actor in a Miniseries or TV series: Julio Chávez — El maestro; Asier Etxeandia — Velvet Collection; Júlio Andrade — 1 Contra Todos; Luis Brandoni — Un gallo para Esculapio; Peter Lanzani — Un gallo para Esculapio | Best Actress in a Miniseries or TV series: Blanca Suárez — Cable Girls; Aura Garrido — The Ministry of Time; Giannina Fruttero — Ramona; Kate del Castillo — Ingobernable; Marta Hazas — Velvet Collection |

=== Honorary Platino ===
- Adriana Barraza

== Performers ==
| Name(s) | Role | Performed |
|---|---|---|
| Maná | Performers | "Si No Te Hubieras Ido" |
| Asier Etxeandia | Performer | "Pavo Real" |
| Morat | Performers | Medley |
| Malú and Axel | Performers | "Que nadie sepa mi sufrir" |
| Maná | Performers | Medley |
