= Platino Award for Best Screenplay =

Ibero-American film award

- Awarded for: Best Screenplay of the Year
- Country: Ibero-America
- Presented by: Entidad de Gestión de Derechos de los Productores Audiovisuales (EGEDA), Federación Iberoamericana de Productores Cinematográficos y Audiovisuales (FIPCA)
- Currently held by: Kleber Mendonça Filho for The Secret Agent (2026)
- Website: premiosplatino.com

The Platino Award for Best Screenplay (Spanish: Premio Platino al mejor guión) is one of the Platino Awards, Ibero-America's film awards, presented by the Entidad de Gestión de Derechos de los Productores Audiovisuales (EGEDA) and the Federación Iberoamericana de Productores Cinematográficos y Audiovisuales (FIPCA).

== History ==
It was first presented in 2014, with Sebastián Lelio and Gonzalo Maza being the first recipients of the award for the Chilean film Gloria. The category includes both original and adapted screenplays.

In the list below. The winner of the award for each year is shown first, followed by the other nominees.

== Awards and nominations ==
=== 2010s ===
| Year | English title | Original title | Recipient |
|---|---|---|---|
| 2014 (1st) | (Chile) Gloria | | Sebastián Lelio & Gonzalo Maza |
| 2014 (1st) | (Spain) Family United | La gran familia española | Daniel Sánchez Arévalo |
| 2014 (1st) | (Spain) Living Is Easy with Eyes Closed | Vivir es fácil con los ojos cerrados | David Trueba |
| 2014 (1st) | (Argentina) The German Doctor | Wakolda | Lucía Puenzo |
| 2015 (2nd) | (Argentina) Wild Tales | Relatos salvajes | Damián Szifron |
| 2015 (2nd) | (Cuba) Behavior | Conducta | Ernesto Daranas |
| 2015 (2nd) | (Spain) Marshland | La isla mínima | Alberto Rodríguez Librero & Rafael Cobos |
| 2015 (2nd) | (Uruguay) Mr. Kaplan | | Álvaro Brechner |
| 2015 (2nd) | (Venezuela) Bad Hair | Pelo malo | Mariana Rondón |
| 2016 (3rd) | (Argentina) The Clan | El Club | Pablo Trapero |
| 2016 (3rd) | (Colombia) Embrace of the Serpent | El abrazo de la serpiente | Ciro Guerra & Jacques Toulemonde Vidal |
| 2016 (3rd) | (Peru) Magallanes | | Salvador del Solar |
| 2016 (3rd) | (Guatemala) Ixcanul | | Jayro Bustamante |
| 2016 (3rd) | (Spain) Truman | | Tomàs Agaray & Cesc Gay |
| 2017 (4th) | (Argentina) The Distinguished Citizen | El ciudadano ilustre | Andrés Duprat |
| 2017 (4th) | (Cuba) The Companion | El acompañante | Pavel Giroud & Pierre Edelman |
| 2017 (4th) | (Spain) Smoke & Mirrors | El hombre de las mil caras | Alberto Rodríguez Librero & Rafael Cobos |
| 2017 (4th) | (Mexico) The Thin Yellow Line | La delgada línea amarilla | Celso R. García |
| 2017 (4th) | (Chile) Neruda | | Guillermo Calderón |
2018 (5th)
| 2018 (5th) | (Chile) A Fantastic Woman | Una mujer fantástica | Sebastián Lelio & Gonzalo Maza |
| 2018 (5th) | (Cuba) Last Days in Havana | Últimos días en La Habana | Fernando Pérez & Abel Rodríguez |
| 2018 (5th) | (Spain) The Bookshop | La librería | Isabel Coixet |
| 2018 (5th) | (Spain) Summer 1993 | Estiu 1993 | Carla Simón |
| 2018 (5th) | (Argentina) Zama | | Lucrecia Martel |
2019 (6th)
| 2019 (6th) | (Mexico) Roma | | Alfonso Cuarón |
| 2019 (6th) | (Spain) Champions | Campeones | David Marqués & Javier Fesser |
| 2019 (6th) | (Uruguay) A Twelve-Year Night | La noche de 12 años | Álvaro Brechner |
| 2019 (6th) | (Paraguay) The Heiresses | Las herederas | Marcelo Martinessi |

=== 2020s ===
| Year | English title | Original title | Recipient |
|---|---|---|---|
| 2020 (7th) | (Spain) Pain and Glory | Dolor y gloria | Pedro Almodóvar |
| 2020 (7th) | (Brazil) The Invisible Life of Eurídice Gusmão | A vida invisível | Murilo Hauser, Inés Bortagaray & Karim Aïnouz |
| 2020 (7th) | (Spain) The Endless Trench | La trinchera infinita | Luiso Berdejo & Jose Mari Goenaga |
| 2020 (7th) | (Spain) While at War | Mientras dure la guerra | Alejandro Amenábar & Alejandro Hernández |
| 2021 (8th) | (Colombia) Forgotten We'll Be | El olvido que seremos | David Trueba |
| 2021 (8th) | (Guatemala) La Llorona | | Jayro Bustamante & Lisandro Sánchez |
| 2021 (8th) | (Spain) Schoolgirls | Las niñas | Pilar Palomero |
| 2021 (8th) | (Argentina) The Crimes That Bind | Crímenes de familia | Pablo Del Teso & Sebastián Schindel |
| 2022 (9th) | (Spain) The Good Boss | El buen patrón | Fernando León de Aranoa |
| 2022 (9th) | (Panama) Plaza Catedral | | Abner Benaim |
| 2022 (9th) | (Brazil) Private Desert | Deserto Particular | Aly Muritiba & Henrique Dos Santos |
| 2022 (9th) | (Spain) Maixabel | | Isa Campo & Icíar Bollaín |
| 2023 (10th) | Argentina, 1985 | | Santiago Mitre, Mariano Llinás |
| 2023 (10th) | (Mexico) Bardo, False Chronicle of a Handful of Truths | Bardo, falsa crónica de unas cuantas verdades | Alejandro González Iñarritu, Nicolás Giacobone |
| 2023 (10th) | (Spain) The Beasts | As bestas | Rodrigo Sorogoyen, Isabel Peña |
| 2023 (10th) | (Chile) 1976 | | Manuela Martelli, Alejandra Moffat |
| 2024 (11th) | (Spain) 20,000 Species of Bees | 20.000 especies de abejas | Estibaliz Urresola |
| 2024 (11th) | (Chile) El conde | | Guillermo Calderón, Pablo Larraín |
| 2024 (11th) | (Spain) Close Your Eyes | Cerrar los ojos | Michel Gaztambide, Víctor Erice |
| 2024 (11th) | (Argentina) The Delinquents | Los delincuentes | Rodrigo Moreno |
| 2025 (12th) | (Spain) Undercover | La infiltrada | Arantxa Echevarría, Amèlia Mora |
| 2025 (12th) | (Costa Rica) Memories of a Burning Body | Memorias de un cuerpo que arde | Antonella Sudasassi Furniss |
| 2025 (12th) | (Spain) A House on Fire | Casa en flames | Eduard Sola |
| 2025 (12th) | (Guatemala) Rita | | Jayro Bustamante |
| 2025 (12th) | (Argentina) Kill the Jockey | El jockey | Fabian Casas, Luis Ortega, Rodolfo Palacios |
| 2026 (13th) | (Brazil) The Secret Agent | O Agente Secreto | Kleber Mendonça Filho |
| 2026 (13th) | (Spain) Sundays | Los domingos | Alauda Ruiz de Azúa |
| 2026 (13th) | (Spain) Sirāt | | Oliver Laxe, Santiago Fillol |
| 2026 (13th) | (Colombia) A Poet | Un poeta | Simón Mesa Soto |

== See also ==
- Goya Award for Best Original Screenplay
- Goya Award for Best Adapted Screenplay
