= Platino Award for Best Cinematography =

- Awarded for: Best Cinematography
- Country: Ibero-America
- Presented by: Entidad de Gestión de Derechos de los Productores Audiovisuales (EGEDA), Federación Iberoamericana de Productores Cinematográficos y Audiovisuales (FIPCA)
- Currently held by: Mauro Herce for Sirāt (2026)
- Website: premiosplatino.com

The Platino Award for Best Cinematography (Spanish: Premio Platino as la mejor fotografía) is one of the Platino Awards, Ibero-America's film awards, presented by the Entidad de Gestión de Derechos de los Productores Audiovisuales (EGEDA) and the Federación Iberoamericana de Productores Cinematográficos y Audiovisuales (FIPCA).

== History ==
The category was first awarded at the second edition of the awards in 2015 with Álex Catalán became the first recipient of the award for his work in the Spanish film Marshland. In 2023, Bárbara Álvarez became the first female recipient of the award for her work in the Bolivian-Uruguayan film Utama.

In the list below. the winner of the award for each year is shown first, followed by the other nominees.

== Awards and nominations ==
=== 2010s ===
Year	English title	Original title	Recipient
2015 (2nd)	(Spain) Marshland	La isla mínima	Alex Catalán
2015 (2nd)	(Argentina) Wild Tales	Relatos salvajes	Javier Juliá
2015 (2nd)	(Cuba) Behavior	Conducta	Alejandro Pérez
2015 (2nd)	(Uruguay) Mr. Kaplan		Álvaro Gutiérrez
2015 (2nd)	(Venezuela) Bad Hair	Pelo malo	Micaela Cajahuaringa
2016 (3rd)	(Colombia) Embrace of the Serpent	El abrazo de la serpiente	David Gallego
2016 (3rd)	(Guatemala) Ixcanul		Luis Armando Arteaga
2016 (3rd)	(Spain) The Bride	La novia	Miguel Ángel Amoedo
2016 (3rd)	(Chile) The Club	El club	Sergio Armstrong
2016 (3rd)	(Chile) The Memory of Water	La memoria del agua	Arnaldo Rodríguez
2017 (4th)	(Spain) A Monster Calls	Un monstruo viene a verme	Óscar Faura
2017 (4th)	(Argentina) Incident Light	La luz incidente	Guillermo Nieto
2017 (4th)	(Portugal) Letters from War	Cartas da Guerra	João Ribeiro
2017 (4th)	(Mexico) The Chosen Ones	Las elegidas	Carolina Costa
2017 (4th)	(Brazil) Neon Bull	Boi Neon	Diego Garcia
2018 (5th)	(Argentina) Zama		Rui Poças
2018 (5th)	(Chile) A Fantastic Woman	Una mujer fantástica	Benjamín Echazarreta
2018 (5th)	(Spain) Summer 1993	Estiu 1993	Santiago Racaj
2018 (5th)	(Argentina) The Summit	La cordillera	Javier Juliá
2018 (5th)	(Cuba) Last Days in Havana	Últimos días en La Habana	Raúl Pérez Ureta
2019 (6th)	(Mexico) Roma		Alfonso Cuarón
2019 (6th)	(Colombia) Birds of Passage	Pájaros de Verano	David Gallego
2019 (6th)	(Uruguay) A Twelve-Year Night	La noche de 12 años	Carlos Catalán
2019 (6th)	(Paraguay) The Heiresses	Las heredoras	Luis Armando Arteaga

=== 2020s ===
Year	English title	Original title	Recipient
2020 (7th)	(Colombia) Monos		Jasper Wolf
2020 (7th)	(Spain) While at War	Mientras dure la guerra	Alex Catalán
2020 (7th)	(Spain) The Endless Trench	La trinchera infinita	Javier Agirre Erauso
2020 (7th)	(Mexico) The Good Girls	Las niñas bien	Daniela Ludlow
2021 (8th)	(Guatemala) La Llorona		Nicolás Wong
2021 (8th)	(Colombia) Forgotten We'll Be	El olvido que seremos	Sergio Iván Castaño
2021 (8th)	(Spain) Coven	Akelarre	Javier Aguirre Erauso
2021 (8th)	(Spain) Schoolgirls	Las niñas	Daniela Cajías
2022 (9th)	(Spain) Mediterraneo: The Law of the Sea	Mediterráneo	Kiko de la Rica
2022 (9th)	(Spain) The Good Boss	El buen patrón	Pau Esteve Birba
2022 (9th)	(Colombia) Memoria		Sayombhu Mukdeeprom
2022 (9th)	(Costa Rica) Clara Sola		Sophie Winqvist
2023 (10th)	(Bolivia) Utama		Bárbara Álvarez
2023 (10th)	(Spain) Alcarràs		Daniela Cajías
2023 (10th)	(Colombia) The Kings of the World	Los reyes del mundo	David Gallego
2023 (10th)	Argentina, 1985		Javier Juliá
2024 (11th)	(Spain) Society of the Snow	La sociedad de la nieve	Pedro Luque
2024 (11th)	(Argentina) The Delinquents	Los delincuentes	Inés Duacastella, Alejo Maglio
2024 (11th)	(Ecuador) Octopus Skin	La piel pulpo	Simón Brauer, Tomás Astudillo
2024 (11th)	(Spain) Close Your Eyes	Cerrar los ojos	Valentín Álvarez
2025 (12th)	(Spain) The Room Next Door	La habitación de al lado	Edu Grau
2025 (12th)	(Guatemala) Rita		Inti Briones
2025 (12th)	(Spain) Undercover	La infiltrada	Javier Salmones
2025 (12th)	(Mexico) Pedro Páramo		Rodrigo Prieto, Nico Aguilar
2026 (13th)	(Spain) Sirāt		Mauro Herce
2026 (13th)	(Spain) Sundays	Los domingos	Bet Rourich
2026 (13th)	(Argentina) Belén		Javier Juliá
2026 (13th)	(Colombia) A Poet	Un poeta	Juan Sarmiento Grisales

== See also ==
- Goya Award for Best Cinematography
