= Platino Award for Film and Values Education =

- Awarded for: merits in the gathering, transmission or induction of reflection of positive values for society as a whole
- Country: Ibero-America
- Presented by: Entidad de Gestión de Derechos de los Productores Audiovisuales (EGEDA), Federación Iberoamericana de Productores Cinematográficos y Audiovisuales (FIPCA)
- Currently held by: Belén (2026)
- Website: premiosplatino.com

The Platino Award for Film and Values Education (Spanish: Premio Platino al Cine y la Educación en Valores) is one of the Platino Awards, Ibero-America's film awards, presented by the Entidad de Gestión de Derechos de los Productores Audiovisuales (EGEDA) and the Federación Iberoamericana de Productores Cinematográficos y Audiovisuales (FIPCA).

== History ==
The category was first awarded at the 4th Platino Awards in 2017, with Cuban film Esteban, directed by Jonal Cosculluela, being the first recipient of the award. According to the Platino Awards website, the category is destined to recognize films that "promote the reflection of certain social and human values, that are considered positive for society as a whole, such as solidarity, fellowship, integrity, among others".

In the list below the winner of the award for each year is shown first, followed by the other nominees.

== Awards and nominations ==
=== 2010s ===
| Year | English title | Original title | Director | Country |
|---|---|---|---|---|
| 2017 (4th) | Esteban | | Jonal Cosculluela | Cuba |
| 2017 (4th) | El Jeremías | | Anwar Safa | Mexico |
| 2017 (4th) | The Companion | El acompañante | Pavel Giroud | Cuba |
| 2017 (4th) | Rara | | Pepa San Martín | Chile |
| 2017 (4th) | A Monster Calls | Un monstro viene a verme | J.A. Bayona | Spain |
| 2018 (5th) | Giant | Handia | Aitor Arregi & Jon Garaño | Spain |
| 2018 (5th) | Bad Influence | Mala junta | Claudia Huaiquimilla | Chile |
| 2018 (5th) | Just Like Our Parents | Como nossos pais | Laís Bodanzky | Brazil |
| 2018 (5th) | The Animal's Wife | La mujer del animal | Victor Gaviria | Colombia |
| 2018 (5th) | A Fantastic Woman | Una mujer fantástica | Sebastián Lelio | Chile |
| 2019 (6th) | Champions | Campeones | Javier Fesser | Spain |
| 2019 (6th) | The Heiresses | Las Herederas | Marcelo Martinessi | Paraguay |
| 2019 (6th) | A Twelve-Year Night | La noche de los 12 años | Álvaro Brechner | Uruguay |
| 2019 (6th) | Carmen & Lola | Carmen y Lola | Arantxa Echevarría | Spain |

=== 2020s ===
| Year | English title | Original title | Director | Country |
|---|---|---|---|---|
| 2020 (7th) | The Awakening of the Ants | El despertar de las hormigas | Antonella Sudasassi | Costa Rica |
| 2020 (7th) | Spider | Araña | Andrés Wood | Chile |
| 2020 (7th) | Seventeen | Diecisiete | Daniel Sánchez Arévalo | Spain |
| 2020 (7th) | Elisa & Marcela | Elisa y Marcela | Isabel Coixet | Spain |
| 2021 (8th) | The Mole Agent | El agente topo | Maite Alberdi | Chile; Spain |
| 2021 (8th) | Our Mothers | Nuestra madres | César Díaz | Guatemala |
| 2021 (8th) | Forgotten We'll Be | El olvido que seremos | Fernando Trueba | Colombia |
| 2021 (8th) | Adú | | Salvador Calvo | Spain |
| 2022 (9th) | Los Lobos | | Samuel Kishi | Mexico |
| 2022 (9th) | Yo, nena, yo princesa | | Federico Palazzo | Argentina |
| 2022 (9th) | Maixabel | | Icíar Bollaín | Spain |
| 2022 (9th) | Mediterraneo: The Law of the Sea | Mediterráneo | Marcel Barrena | Spain |
| 2023 (10th) | Argentina, 1985 | | Santiago Mitre | Argentina |
| 2023 (10th) | Lullaby | Cinco lobitos | Alauda Ruiz de Azúa | Spain |
| 2023 (10th) | The Substitute | El suplente | Diego Lerman | Argentina; Spain; Mexico |
| 2023 (10th) | Utama | | Alejandro Loayza Grisi | Bolivia; Uruguay |
| 2024 (11th) | 20,000 Species of Bees | 20.000 especies de abejas | Estibaliz Urresola Solaguren | Spain |
| 2024 (11th) | The Eternal Memory | La memoria infinita | Maite Alberdi | Chile |
| 2024 (11th) | Puan | | María Alché, Benjamín Naishtat | Argentina; Brazil |
| 2024 (11th) | Radical | | Christopher Zalla | Mexico |
| 2025 (12th) | Memories of a Burning Body | Memorias de un cuerpo que arde | Antonella Sudasassi Furniss | Costa Rica; Spain |
| 2025 (12th) | The Dog Thief | El ladrón de perros | Vinko Tomičić | Bolivia; Chile; Ecuador; Mexico |
| 2025 (12th) | Alemania | | María Zanetti | Argentina; Spain |
| 2025 (12th) | I'm Nevenka | Soy Nevenka | Icíar Bollaín | Spain |
| 2026 (13th) | Belén | | Dolores Fonzi | Argentina |
| 2026 (13th) | Manas | | Marianna Brennand | Brazil; Portugal |
| 2026 (13th) | The Woman in the Line | La mujer de la fila | Benjamín Ávila | Argentina; Spain |
| 2026 (13th) | Deaf | Sorda | Eva Libertad | Spain |
