= Platino Award for Best Ibero-American Film =

- Country: Ibero-America
- Presented by: Entidad de Gestión de Derechos de los Productores Audiovisuales (EGEDA), Federación Iberoamericana de Productores Cinematográficos y Audiovisuales (FIPCA)
- Currently held by: The Secret Agent (2026)
- Website: premiosplatino.com

The Platino Award for Best Ibero-American Picture (Spanish: Premio Platino a la mejor película iberoamericana) is one of the Platino Awards, Ibero-America's film awards, presented annually by the Entidad de Gestión de Derechos de los Productores Audiovisuales (EGEDA) and the Federación Iberoamericana de Productores Cinematográficos y Audiovisuales (FIPCA). It was first given in 2014, with Sebastian Lelio's drama film Gloria being the inaugural winner.

Three of the winners in the category have also won the Academy Award for Best International Feature Film (A Fantastic Woman, Roma and I'm Still Here), additionally, winners Wild Tales, Embrace of the Serpent, Pain and Glory, Argentina, 1985 , Society of the Snow and The Secret Agent were nominated for the same award.

Argentina and Spain holds the record of most wins in the category with three victories each (Wild Tales, The Distinguished Citizen and Argentina, 1985 for Argentina; and Pain and Glory, The Good Boss and Society of the Snow for Spain). Spain is the most nominated country with eighteen Spanish productions being nominated for the category.

In the list below the winner of the award for each year is shown first, followed by the other nominees.

== Awards and nominations ==
=== 2010s ===
Year	English title	Original title	Director	Country
2014 (1st)	Gloria		Sebastián Lelio	Chile
2014 (1st)	Heli		Amat Escalante	Mexico
2014 (1st)	The Golden Dream	La jaula de oro	Diego Quemada-Díez	Mexico
2014 (1st)	Witching & Bitching	Las brujas de Zugarramurdi	Álex de la Iglesia	Spain
2014 (1st)	Living Is Easy with Eyes Closed	Vivir es fácil con los ojos cerrados	David Trueba	Spain
2014 (1st)	The German Doctor	Wakolda	Lucía Puenzo	Argentina
2014 (1st)	Roa		Andrés Baiz	Colombia
2015 (2nd)	Wild Tales	Relatos salvajes	Damián Szifron	Argentina
2015 (2nd)	Behavior	Conducta	Ernesto Daranas	Cuba
2015 (2nd)	Marshland	La isla mínima	Alberto Rodríguez Librero	Spain
2015 (2nd)	Mr. Kaplan		Álvaro Brechner	Uruguay
2015 (2nd)	Bad Hair	Pelo malo	Mariana Rondón	Venezuela
2016 (3rd)	Embrace of the Serpent	El abrazo de la serpiente	Ciro Guerra	Colombia
2016 (3rd)	The Clan	El Clan	Pablo Trapero	Argentina
2016 (3rd)	The Club	El Club	Pablo Larraín	Chile
2016 (3rd)	Ixcanul		Jayro Bustamante	Guatemala
2016 (3rd)	Truman		Cesc Gay	Spain
2017 (4th)	The Distinguished Citizen	El ciudadano ilustre	Gastón Duprat & Mariano Cohn	Argentina
2017 (4th)	Aquarius		Kleber Mendonça Filho	Brazil
2017 (4th)	Smoke & Mirrors	El hombre de las mil caras	Alberto Rodríguez	Spain
2017 (4th)	Julieta		Pedro Almodóvar	Spain
2017 (4th)	Neruda		Pablo Larraín	Chile
2018 (5th)
2018 (5th)	A Fantastic Woman	Una mujer fantástica	Sebastián Lelio	Chile
2018 (5th)	Last Days in Havana	Últimos días en La Habana	Fernando Pérez	Cuba
2018 (5th)	The Bookshop	La librería	Isabel Coixet	Spain
2018 (5th)	The Summit	La cordillera	Santiago Mitre	Argentina
2018 (5th)	Zama		Lucrecia Martel	Argentina
2019 (6th)
2019 (6th)	Roma		Alfonso Cuarón	Mexico
2019 (6th)	Champions	Campeones	Javier Fesser	Spain
2019 (6th)	A Twelve-Year Night	La noche de 12 Años	Álvaro Brechner	Uruguay
2019 (6th)	Birds of Passage	Pájaros de Verano	Ciro Guerra & Cristina Gallego	Colombia

=== 2020s ===
Year	English title	Original title	Director	Country
2020 (7th)	Pain and Glory	Dolor y gloria	Pedro Almodóvar	Spain
2020 (7th)	The Invisible Life of Eurídice Gusmão	A vida invisível	Karim Aïnouz	Brazil
2020 (7th)	Monos		Alejandro Landes	Colombia
2020 (7th)	The Endless Trench	La trinchera infinita	Jon Garaño, Aitor Arregi & Jose Mari Goenaga	Spain
2021 (8th)	Forgotten We'll Be	El olvido que seremos	Fernando Trueba	Colombia
2021 (8th)	La Llorona		Jayro Bustamante	Guatemala
2021 (8th)	Schoolgirls	Las niñas	Pilar Palomero	Spain
2021 (8th)	New Order	Nuevo Orden	Michel Franco	Mexico
2022 (9th)	The Good Boss	El buen patrón	Fernando León de Aranoa	Spain
2022 (9th)	Prayers for the Stolen	Noche de fuego	Tatiana Huezo	Mexico
2022 (9th)	Parallel Mothers	Madres paralelas	Pedro Almodóvar	Spain
2022 (9th)	Maixabel		Icíar Bollaín	Spain
2023 (10th)	Argentina, 1985		Santiago Mitre	Argentina
2023 (10th)	Alcarràs		Carla Simón	Spain
2023 (10th)	The Beasts	As bestas	Rodrigo Sorogoyen	Spain
2023 (10th)	Bardo, False Chronicle of a Handful of Truths	Bardo, falsa crónica de unas cuantas verdades	Alejandro González Iñarritu	Mexico
2024 (11th)	Society of the Snow	La sociedad de la nieve	J. A. Bayona	Spain
2024 (11th)	Close Your Eyes	Cerrar los ojos	Víctor Erice	Spain
2024 (11th)	The Delinquents	Los delincuentes	Rodrigo Moreno	Argentina
2024 (11th)	Tótem		Lila Avilés	Mexico
2025 (12th)	I'm Still Here	Ainda Estou Aqui	Walter Salles	Brazil
2025 (12th)	The 47	El 47	Marcel Barrena	Spain
2025 (12th)	Undercover	La infiltrada	Arantxa Echevarría	Spain
2025 (12th)	Kill the Jockey	El jockey	Luis Ortega	Argentina
2025 (12th)	Grand Tour		Miguel Gomes	Portugal
2026 (13th)	The Secret Agent	O Agente Secreto	Kleber Mendonça Filho	Brazil
2026 (13th)	It Would Be Night in Caracas	Aún es de noche en Caracas	Mariana Rondón, Marité Ugás	Venezuela
2026 (13th)	Belén		Dolores Fonzi	Argentina
2026 (13th)	Sundays	Los domingos	Alauda Ruiz de Azúa	Spain
2026 (13th)	Sirāt		Óliver Laxe	Spain

== Awards by nation ==
Country	Awards (as of 2026)	Nominations (as of 2026)
Spain	3	22
Argentina	3	10
Colombia	2	5
Chile	2	4
Brazil	2	4
Mexico	1	7
Guatemala	0	2
Uruguay	0	2
Cuba	0	2
Venezuela	0	2
Portugal	0	1

== See also ==
- Goya Award for Best Iberoamerican Film
- Ariel Award for Best Ibero-American Film
