= 4th Platino Awards =

- Date: July 22, 2017
- Site: Caja Mágica, Madrid, Spain

Highlights
- Most nominations: A Monster Calls (7)

The 4th Platino Awards was presented at Caja Mágica in Madrid, Spain on July 22, 2017, to honour the best in Ibero-American films of 2016.

A Monster Calls received the most nominations with seven.

== Winners and nominees ==
=== Major awards ===
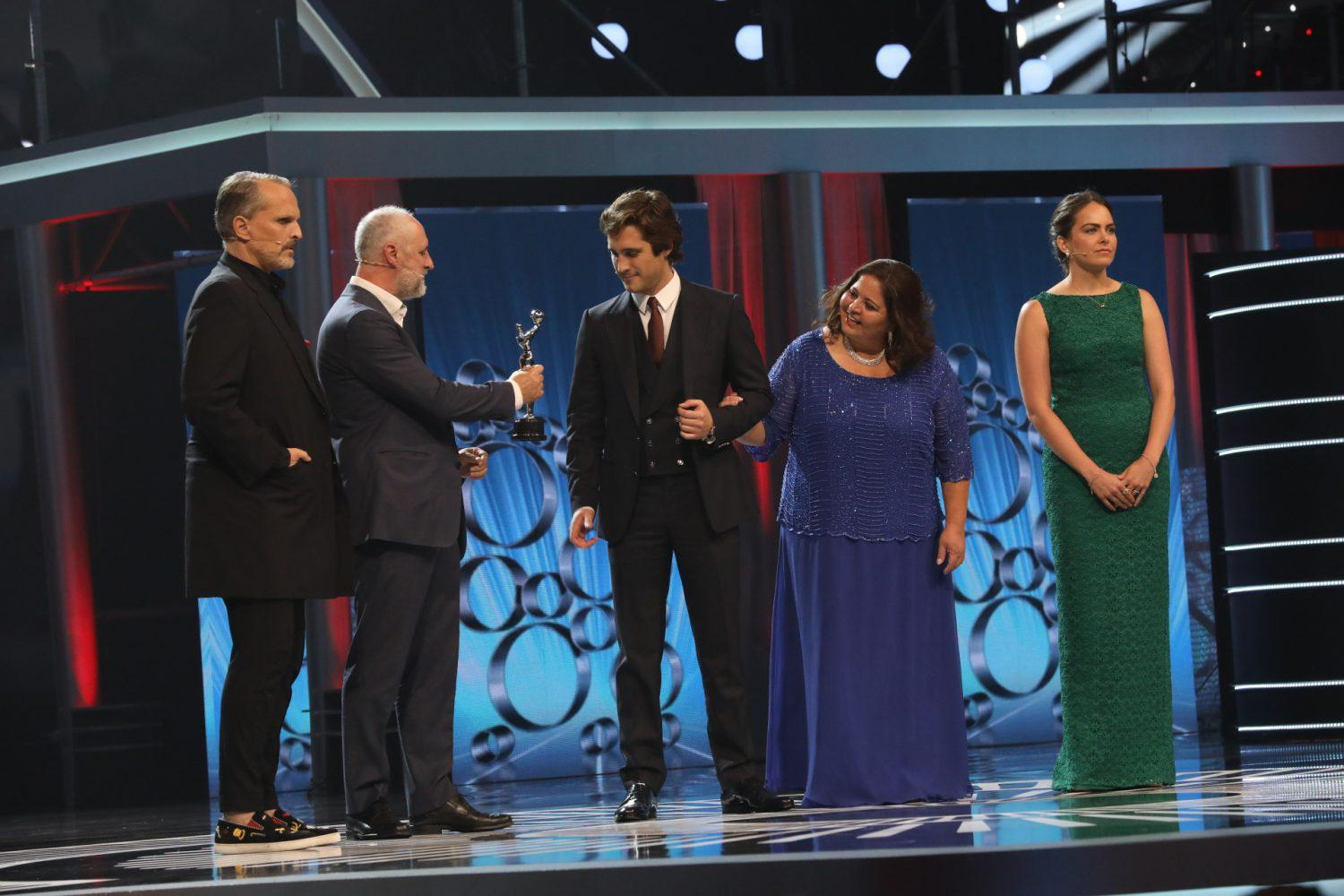
Miguel Bosé, Luis Cueto, Diego Boneta and Marisol Vanegas during the ceremony.

| Best Ibero-American Film: The Distinguished Citizen; Aquarius; Smoke & Mirrors; Julieta; Neruda | Best Director: Pedro Almodóvar – Julieta; J. A. Bayona – A Monster Calls; Kleber Mendonça Filho – Aquarius; Gastón Duprat & Mariano Cohn – The Distinguished Citizen; Pablo Larraín – Neruda |
| Platino Award for Best Actor: Oscar Martínez – The Distinguished Citizen as Daniel Mantovani; Alfredo Castro – From Afar as Armando; Damián Alcázar – The Thin Yellow Line as Toño; Eduard Fernández – Smoke & Mirrors as Francisco Paesa; Luis Gnecco – Neruda as Pablo Neruda | Platino Award for Best Actress: Sônia Braga – Aquarius as Dona Clara; Angie Cepeda – The Seed of Silence as María del Rosario Durán; Emma Suárez – Julieta as Julieta Arcos; Juana Acosta – Anna as Anna; Natalia Oreiro – I'm Gilda as Gilda |
| Best Screenplay | Best Original Score |
| The Distinguished Citizen – Andrés Duprat; Smoke & Mirrors – Alberto Rodríguez & Rafael Cobos; The Companion – Pavel Giroud, Alejandro Brugues & Pierre Edelman; The Thin Yellow Line – Celso García; Neruda – Guillermo Calderón | Julieta – Alberto Iglesias; Esteban – Chucho Valdés; Neruda – Federico Jusid; A Monster Calls – Fernando Velázquez; Incident Light – Mariano Loiácono |
| Best Animated Film: Psychonauts, the Forgotten Children; Bruxarias; La Leyenda del Chupacabras; Ozzy; Teresa y Tim | Best Documentary: Nacido en Siria; Atrapados en Japón; Cinema Novo; Delicate Balance; It All Started at the End |
| Best Cinematography: A Monster Calls – Óscar Faura; The Chosen Ones – Carolina Costa; Neon Bull – Diego Garcia; Incident Light – Guillermo Nieto; Letters from War – João Ribeiro | Best Art Direction: A Monster Calls – Eugenio Caballero; Incident Light – Ailí Chen; The Queen of Spain – Juan Pedro de Gaspar; Letters from War – Nuno Mello; The Death of Louis XIV – Sebastián Vogler |
| Best Editing: A Monster Calls – Bernat Vilaplana & Jaume Martí; May God Forgive Us – Alberto del Campo & Fernando Franco; From Afar – Isabela Monteiro de Castro; The Thin Yellow Line – Jorge Arturo Garcia; Such Is Life in the Tropics – José García | Best Sound: A Monster Calls – Peter Glossop, Marc Orts & Oriol Tarragó; Smoke & Mirrors – Daniel de Zayas, César Molina & José Antonio Manovel; Letters from War – Ricardo Leal & Tiago Matos; Desierto – Sergio Díaz; From Afar – Waldir Xavier |
| Best Ibero-American First Film: From Afar; The Thin Yellow Line; Rara; The Fury of a Patient Man; Viejo Calavera | Cinema and Education in Values: Esteban; The Companion; El Jeremías; Rara; A Monster Calls |
Best Miniseries or TV series: Cuatro estaciones en La Habana; Bala Loca; El marginal; El Ministerio del Tiempo; La niña; Velvet

=== Honorary Platino ===
- Edward James Olmos

== Films with multiple nominations and awards ==
The following films received multiple nominations:

| Nominations | Film |
|---|---|
| 7 | A Monster Calls |
| 5 | Neruda |
| 4 | The Distinguished Citizen |
| 4 | Smoke & Mirrors |
| 4 | Julieta |
| 4 | The Thin Yellow Line |
| 4 | From Afar |
| 3 | Aquarius |
| 3 | Incident Light |
| 3 | Letters from War |
| 2 | The Companion |
| 2 | Rara |
| 2 | Esteban |
