= Platino Award for Best Original Score =

Film Award

- Awarded for: Best Original Score of the Year
- Country: Ibero-America
- Presented by: Entidad de Gestión de Derechos de los Productores Audiovisuales (EGEDA), Federación Iberoamericana de Productores Cinematográficos y Audiovisuales (FIPCA)
- Currently held by: Tomaz Alves Souza, Mateus Alves for The Secret Agent (2026)
- Website: premiosplatino.com

The Platino Award for Best Original Score (Spanish: Premio Platino al mejor banda sonora) is one of the Platino Awards, Ibero-America's film awards, presented by the Entidad de Gestión de Derechos de los Productores Audiovisuales (EGEDA) and the Federación Iberoamericana de Productores Cinematográficos y Audiovisuales (FIPCA).

== History ==
It was first presented in 2014, with Argentine composer Emilio Kauderer being the first recipient of the award for his work in the animated film Underdogs. Spanish composer Alberto Iglesias holds the record of most wins in the category with six, four of them being consecutive (from 2017 to 2020). Iglesias also holds the record of most nominations with six. For his work in Parallel Mothers, Iglesias won the Platino and was nominated for the Academy Award for Best Original Score.

In the list below. the winner of the award for each year is shown first, followed by the other nominees.

== Awards and nominations ==
=== 2010s ===
Year	English title	Original title	Recipient
2014 (1st)	(Argentina) Underdogs	Metegol	Emilio Kauderer
2014 (1st)	(Peru) The Cleaner	El limpiador	Karin Zielinski
2014 (1st)	(Spain) Witching & Bitching	Las brujas de Zugarramurdi	Joan Valent
2015 (2nd)	(Argentina) Wild Tales	Relatos salvajes	Gustavo Santaolalla
2015 (2nd)	(Spain) El Niño		Roque Baños
2015 (2nd)	(Chile) The Dance of Reality	La danza de la realidad	Adan Jodorowsky
2015 (2nd)	(Spain) Marshland	La isla mínima	Julio de la Rosa
2015 (2nd)	(Venezuela) The Liberator	Libertador	Gustavo Dudamel
2015 (2nd)	(Cuba) Behavior	Conducta	Magda Rosa Galbán & Juan Antonio Leyva
2016 (3rd)	(Colombia) Embrace of the Serpent	El abrazo de la serpiente	Nascuy Linares
2016 (3rd)	(Guatemala) Ixcanul		Pascual Reyes
2016 (3rd)	(Spain) Ma Ma		Alberto Iglesias
2016 (3rd)	(Peru) Magallanes		Federico Jusid
2016 (3rd)	(Spain) Nobody Wants the Night	Nadie quiere la noche	Lucas Vidal
2017 (4th)	(Spain) Julieta		Alberto Iglesias
2017 (4th)	(Cuba) Esteban		Chucho Valdés
2017 (4th)	(Chile) Neruda		Federico Jusid
2017 (4th)	(Spain) A Monster Calls	Un monstruo viene a verme	Fernando Velázquez
2017 (4th)	(Argentina) Incident Light	La luz incidente	Mariano Loiácono
2018 (5th)	(Argentina) The Summit	La cordillera	Alberto Iglesias
2018 (5th)	(Spain) The Bookshop	La librería	Alfonso Vilallonga
2018 (5th)	(Paraguay) The Gold Seekers	Los buscadores	Derlis A. González
2018 (5th)	(Cuba) On the Roof	El techo	Magda Rosa Galbán & Juan Antonio Leyva
2018 (5th)	(Brazil) The Movie of My Life	O Filme da Minha Vida	Plínio Profeta
2019 (6th)	(Spain) Yuli: The Carlos Acosta Story	Yuli	Alberto Iglesias
2019 (6th)	(Brazil) The Great Mystical Circus	O Grande Circo Místico	Edu Lobo
2019 (6th)	(Uruguay) A Twelve-Year Night	La noche de 12 años	Federico Jusid
2019 (6th)	(Spain) The Realm	El reino	Olivier Arson

=== 2020s ===
Year	English title	Original title	Recipient
2020 (7th)	(Spain) Pain and Glory	Dolor y gloria	Alberto Iglesias
2020 (7th)	(Argentina) The Weasel's Tale	El cuento de las comadrejas	Emilio Kauderer
2020 (7th)	(Spain) While at War	Mientras dure la guerra	Alejandro Amenábar
2020 (7th)	(Colombia) Monos		Mica Levi
2021 (8th)	(Spain) Coven	Akelarre	Maite Arrotajauregi & Aránzazu Calleja
2021 (8th)	(Guatemala) La Llorona		Pascual Reyes
2021 (8th)	(Peru) Song Without a Name	Canción sin nombre	Pauchi Sasaki
2021 (8th)	(Colombia) Forgotten We'll Be	El olvido que seremos	Zbigniew Preisner
2022 (9th)	(Spain) Parallel Mothers	Madres paralelas	Alberto Iglesias
2022 (9th)	(Colombia) Memoria		César López
2022 (9th)	(Mexico) Los Lobos		Kenji Kishi Leopo
2022 (9th)	(Spain) The Good Boss	El buen patrón	Zeltia Montes
2023 (10th)	(Bolivia) Utama		Cergio Prudencio
2023 (10th)	(Spain) Lullaby	Cinco lobitos	Aránzazu Calleja
2023 (10th)	(Colombia) The Kings of the World	Los reyes del mundo	Leonardo Heiblum, Alexis Ruíz
2023 (10th)	Argentina, 1985		Pedro Osuna
2024 (11th)	(Spain) Robot Dreams		Alfonso Vilallonga
2024 (11th)	(Mexico) Radical		Pascual Reyes, Juan Pablo Villa
2024 (11th)	(Argentina) Blondi		Pedro Osuna
2024 (11th)	(Puerto Rico) The Fishbowl	La pecera	Sergio de la Puente
2025 (12th)	(Spain) The Room Next Door	La habitación de al lado	Alberto Iglesias
2025 (12th)	(Spain) Undercover	La infiltrada	Fernando Velázquez
2025 (12th)	(Mexico) Pedro Páramo		Gustavo Santaolalla
2025 (12th)	(Ecuador) La Invención de las Especies		Ulises Hernández
2026 (13th)	(Brazil) The Secret Agent	O Agente Secreto	Tomaz Alves Souza, Mateus Alves
2026 (13th)	(Bolivia) El último blues del croata		Alejandro Rivas Cottle, Gonzalo Pardo
2026 (13th)	(Spain) Maspalomas		Aránzazu Calleja
2026 (13th)	(Colombia) A Poet	Un poeta	Matti Bye, Trio Ramberget

== See also ==
- Goya Award for Best Original Score
