= Daniela Vega =

Chilean actress and mezzo-soprano singer (born 1989)

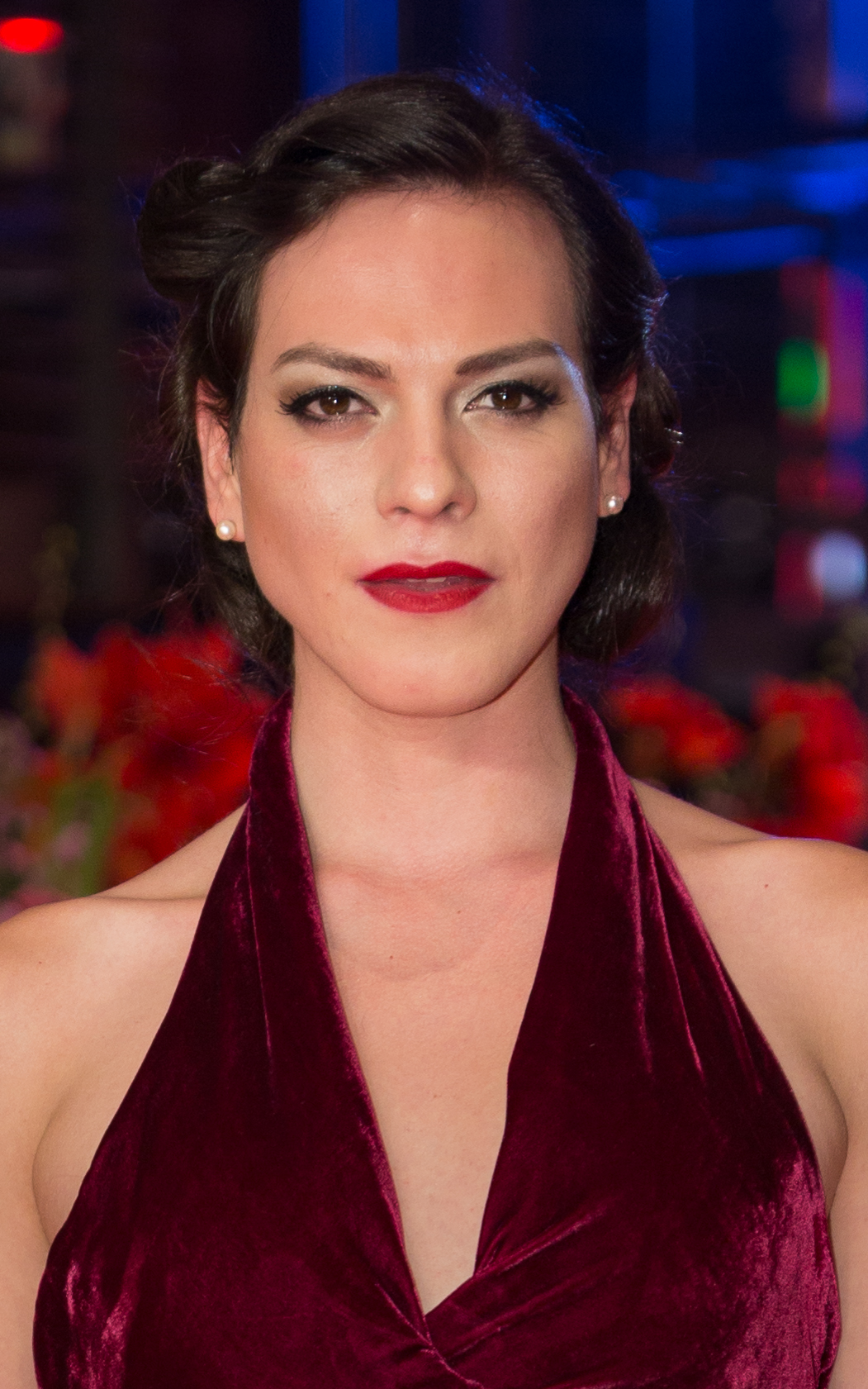
- Vega at the Berlin International Film Festival in 2017
- Born: 1989 (age 36–37); San Miguel, Santiago Province, Chile
- Other name: Dani Vega
- Occupations: Actress; singer
- Years active: 2011–present

Daniela Vega Hernández (born 1989) is a Chilean actress and mezzo-soprano singer. She is best known for her critically acclaimed performance in the Academy Award-winning film A Fantastic Woman (2017). At the 90th Academy Awards in 2018, Vega became the first transgender person in history to be a presenter at the Academy Awards ceremony. In 2018, Time magazine named her one of the 100 most influential people in the world.

== Early life and education ==
Daniela Vega Hernández was born in 1989 in San Miguel, Santiago Province, as the first child of Igor Alejandro Vega Inostroza and Sandra del Carmen Hernandez de la Cuadra. Vega began studying opera with her grandmother at the age of eight.

Growing up, she attended an all-boys school, where she was bullied. It was while she was attending the all-boys school in her teens that she realized she was a girl and began to transition. Her parents and younger brother Nicolás were supportive of her, despite the conservative nature of Chile at that time. Vega described suffering depression for the three years of transition due to the lack of opportunities in Chile to progress her education or express herself, but Vega's parents were supportive and her father encouraged her to go to beauty school, and later theater school.

== Career ==
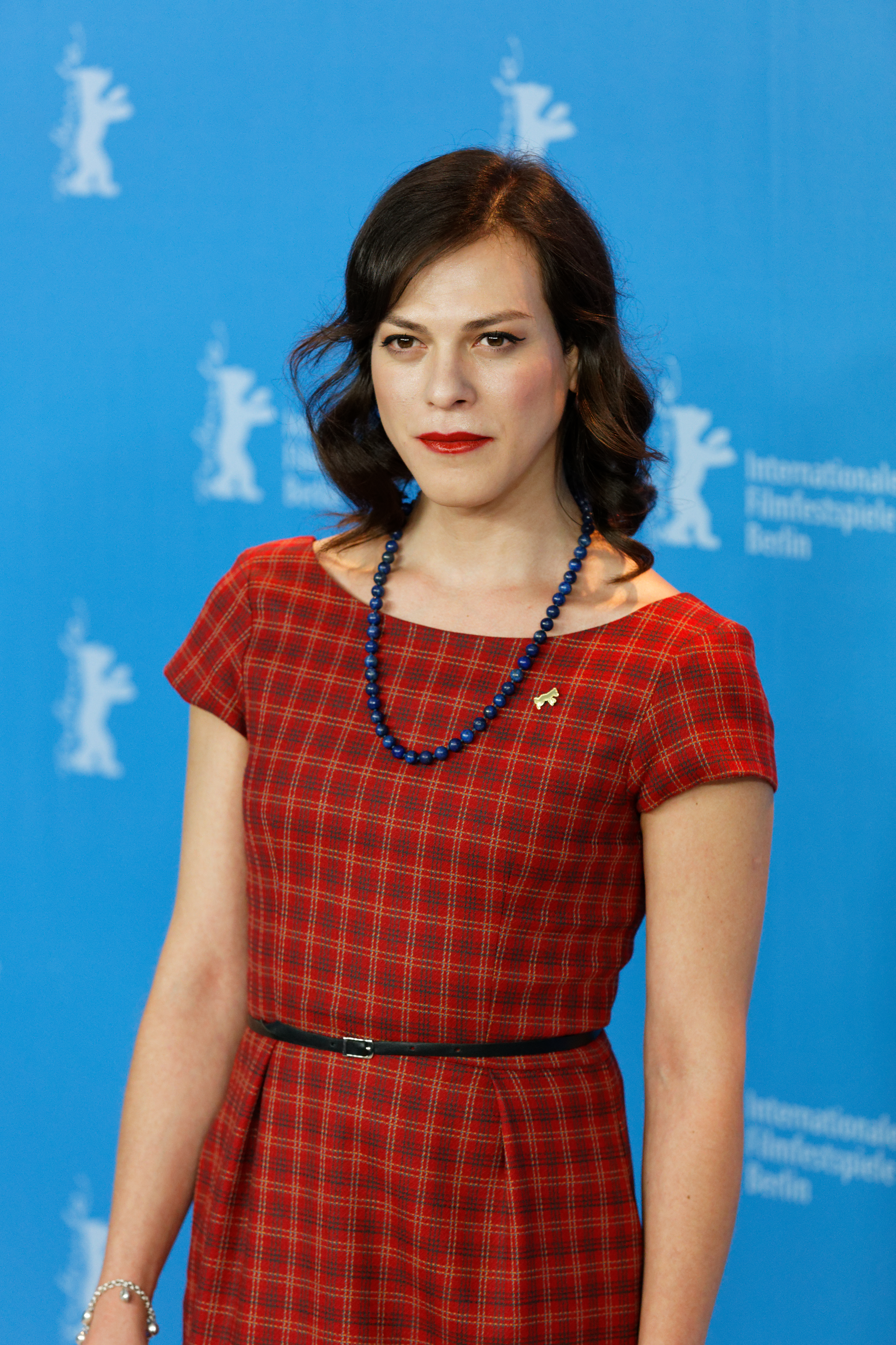
Vega at the 67th Berlin International Film Festival in 2017

=== 2011–2017: Early roles and breakthrough ===
Vega was asked by a writer and director to collaborate on a stage piece about transitioning, using her experience as a foundation. Her contribution resulted in her going on to star in the eventual stage production, Martin de la Parra's 2011 play La mujer Mariposa (The Butterfly Woman). This piece, where she also had the opportunity to sing, ran for eight years in Santiago. During this time, she participated in more pieces, most notably in Migrante (Migrant), a piece about migration. Vega's profile was elevated to a wider audience when she appeared in the music video of the famous song "Maria" by Manuel García in 2014. The song and music video were made in collaboration with a gay suicide prevention organization, to help raise awareness and prevent suicide in gay teens. She made her screen debut in 2014 in a drama called The Guest (La visita), playing a trans woman at her father's wake.

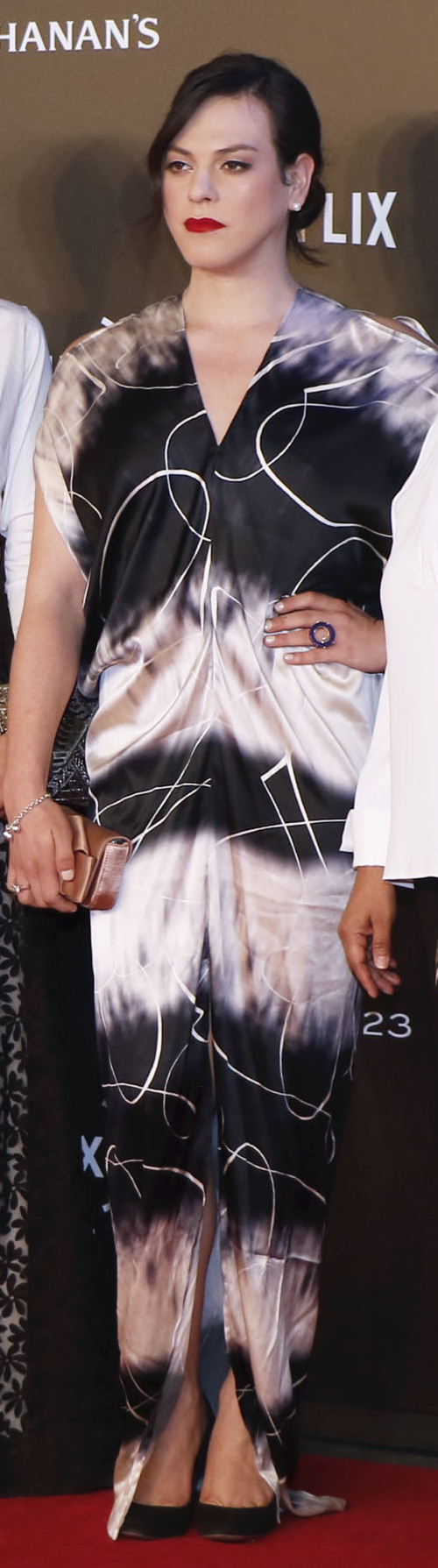
Vega at the red carpet of the Fénix Awards 2017, Mexico

The 67th Berlin International Film Festival saw the release of A Fantastic Woman (2017), directed by Sebastián Lelio, a film for which her performance was acclaimed by critics. A Fantastic Woman tells the story of Marina (played by Vega) and Orlando (played by Francisco Reyes), an older man with whom she is in love and planning a future. After Orlando falls ill and dies, Marina is forced to face family and society, and fight again to show who she is: a fantastic woman. Critic Guy Lodge in a review for Variety praising Vega's performance said: "Vega's tough, expressive, and subtly distressed performance deserves far more than political praise." He continued to note that "It’s a multi-layered, emotionally polymorphous feat of acting, nurtured with pitch-perfect sensitivity by her director, who maintains complete candor on Marina’s condition without pushing her anywhere she wouldn’t herself go." Her name was strongly mentioned for an Oscar nomination as Best Actress. She won an award for her performance at the Palm Springs International Film Festival for Best Actress in a Foreign Language Film. A Fantastic Woman went on to win the Academy Award for Best Foreign Language Film, and Vega became the first openly transgender person ever to be a presenter at the Academy Awards ceremony in 2018.

In 2018, it was announced that Vega would have a recurring role in the Netflix miniseries Tales of the City.

== Media image ==
Vega became the first transgender person in history to be an Academy Awards presenter in 2018. Time magazine named Vega one of the 100 most influential people in the world in 2018. Hernández can sing mezzo-soprano.

== Filmography ==
=== Film ===
Year	Title	Role	Notes	Ref(s)
2014	The Guest	Elena	Original title: La visita	
2017	A Fantastic Woman	Marina Vidal	Original title: Una mujer fantástica	
2019	The night, unsheltered	Gabriela	Short film	
2020	Un Domingo de Julio en Santiago	Pamela		
2024	Technoboys	Charlize		
TBA †	Futura	TBA	Post-production	

Key
†	Denotes films that have not yet been released

=== Television ===
Year	Title	Role	Notes	Ref(s)
2019	Tales of the City	Ysela	3 episodes	
2020	The Pack	Elisa Murillo	Main cast	
2022	La rebelión	Jana	Main role	
2022	Once Upon a Time... Happily Never After	The Witch / Enamora	Main role	
2023	The Power	Sister Maria	Main role	

Key
†	Denotes television shows that have not yet been released

== Awards and nominations ==
Year	Award	Nominated work	Category	Result	Ref(s)
2015	17èmes Rencontres du Cinéma sud-américain	The Guest (La visita)	Best Actress	Won	
2017	Film Festival Lima PUCP	A Fantastic Woman	Best Actress	Won	
2017	4th Fénix Awards	A Fantastic Woman	Best Actress	Won	
2017	Havana Film Festival	A Fantastic Woman	Best Actress	Won	
2018	Palm Springs Film Festival	A Fantastic Woman	Best Actress in a Foreign Language Film	Won	
2018	Dorian Awards	A Fantastic Woman	Best Performance of the Year – Actress	Nominated	
2018	Dorian Awards	Herself	Rising Star Award	Nominated	
2018	International Cinephile Society Awards	A Fantastic Woman	Best Actress	Nominated	
2018	Caleuche Awards	A Fantastic Woman	Best Leading Actress	Won	
2018	5th Platino Awards	A Fantastic Woman	Best Actress	Won	
