= Argentina, 1985 =

2022 Argentine film by Santiago Mitre

- Theatrical release poster
- Directed by: Santiago Mitre
- Written by: Santiago Mitre; Mariano Llinás
- Produced by: Axel Kuschevatzky; Federico Posternak; Agustina Llambí Campbell; Ricardo Darín; Santiago Mitre; Santiago Carabante; Chino Darín; Victoria Alonso
- Starring: Ricardo Darín; Peter Lanzani; Alejandra Flechner; Norman Briski
- Cinematography: Javier Juliá
- Edited by: Andrés P. Estrada
- Music by: Pedro Osuna
- Production companies: La Unión de los Ríos; Kenya Films; Infinity Hill
- Distributed by: Amazon Studios; Digicine
- Release dates: 3 September 2022 (Venice); 29 September 2022 (Argentina); 21 October 2022 (UK and US)
- Running time: 140 minutes
- Countries: Argentina; United Kingdom; United States
- Language: Spanish
- Box office: AR$659 million (Argentina); US$905,893 (Spain and Italy)

Argentina, 1985 is a 2022 historical legal drama film produced and directed by Santiago Mitre. Written by Mitre and Mariano Llinás, it stars Ricardo Darín, Peter Lanzani, Alejandra Flechner, and Norman Briski. The film follows the 1985 trial of the military dictatorship that ruled Argentina, during which torture, extrajudicial murder, and forced disappearances were a systematic occurrence. It focuses on the perspective of the prosecution team, led by Julio César Strassera and Luis Moreno Ocampo, including their investigation before the trial.

Work on the screenplay began around five years before the film's release. After reading the first draft of the script, Darín took the main role and became a producer on the film. Production company Amazon Studios joined the project once the script was finished and the casting determined. Filming began in June 2021 and wrapped in September, taking place primarily in Buenos Aires. The film was shot where the depicted events took place, such as the original courtroom at Tribunales.

Co-produced by Argentina, the United Kingdom and the United States, Argentina, 1985 premiered in the main competition at the 79th Venice International Film Festival on 3 September 2022, where it won the FIPRESCI Award. Theatrically released in Argentina on 29 September and in the UK and US on 21 October, it was a commercial success, debuting at number one at the Argentine box office and becoming the most-watched Argentine film of 2022. It received critical acclaim, and won, among others, the Golden Globe Award for Best Foreign Language Film, the Goya Award for Best Ibero-American Film, and the National Board of Review Freedom of Expression Award. It was also named one of the top five international films of 2022 by the National Board of Review and received an Academy Award nomination for Best International Feature Film.

== Plot ==
Chief prosecutor Julio César Strassera reading his closing argument at the Trial of the Juntas.

In 1985, Argentina has had a democratic government for less than two years after its last military junta ended. Public prosecutor Julio César Strassera is chosen to make the government's case against the military junta for alleged crimes against humanity after the military courts declined to press charges. The junta have retained the services of senior, experienced lawyers, while Strassera struggles to find lawyers to form his prosecution team. Strassera meets Luis Moreno Ocampo, his assigned deputy prosecutor, but initially rejects his offer for help due to Ocampo's military family background. Strassera receives several death threats and is assigned a security detail.

Finding no other lawyers, Strassera accepts Moreno Ocampo's help. Moreno Ocampo, a professor, suggests that they look for young law graduates and inexperienced lawyers, as senior lawyers are unwilling to risk their reputations or safety to sign on to a trial that is so divisive among the public.

Strassera and Moreno Ocampo interview and assemble a team, many of whom work in government offices and can use their access to materials to help the case. Because the atrocities were committed across the country, Strassera and his team seek victims and record their testimonies. Meanwhile, he and his team face risks to their safety. Moreno Ocampo's family turn on him for going against their military history.

On the first day of the trial, the court receives a bomb threat, but Strassera convinces the judges that the trial must proceed. The trial is recorded by cameras and parts of it are broadcast around the world. Many victims of the junta testify about torture they endured or witnessed. President Raúl Alfonsín invites Strassera to meet with him and informs him that he is keeping a close watch on the court events and was deeply moved by the testimony of the witnesses. Despite this, the Attorney General angers Strassera by intimating that he should be lenient with the Air Force.

For his closing argument, Strassera realizes that he will have the chance to make his case not just to the judges in the courtroom, but to the people of Argentina and those around the world. With the help of his family, he composes an eloquent closing statement, ending: "Your Honors: never again!". The judges move into deliberations, and Strassera's team await the outcome.

A dying friend asks Strassera for details of the final sentences. Strassera lies and tells him that all the generals received life sentences. Shortly after, Strassera learns that the court is sentencing General Jorge Videla and Admiral Emilio Massera to life imprisonment, General Roberto Viola to seventeen years, Admiral Armando Lambruschini to eight years, and General Orlando Agosti to four and a half years. Dissatisfied with most of the outcomes, Strassera begins typewriting an appeal.

== Cast ==
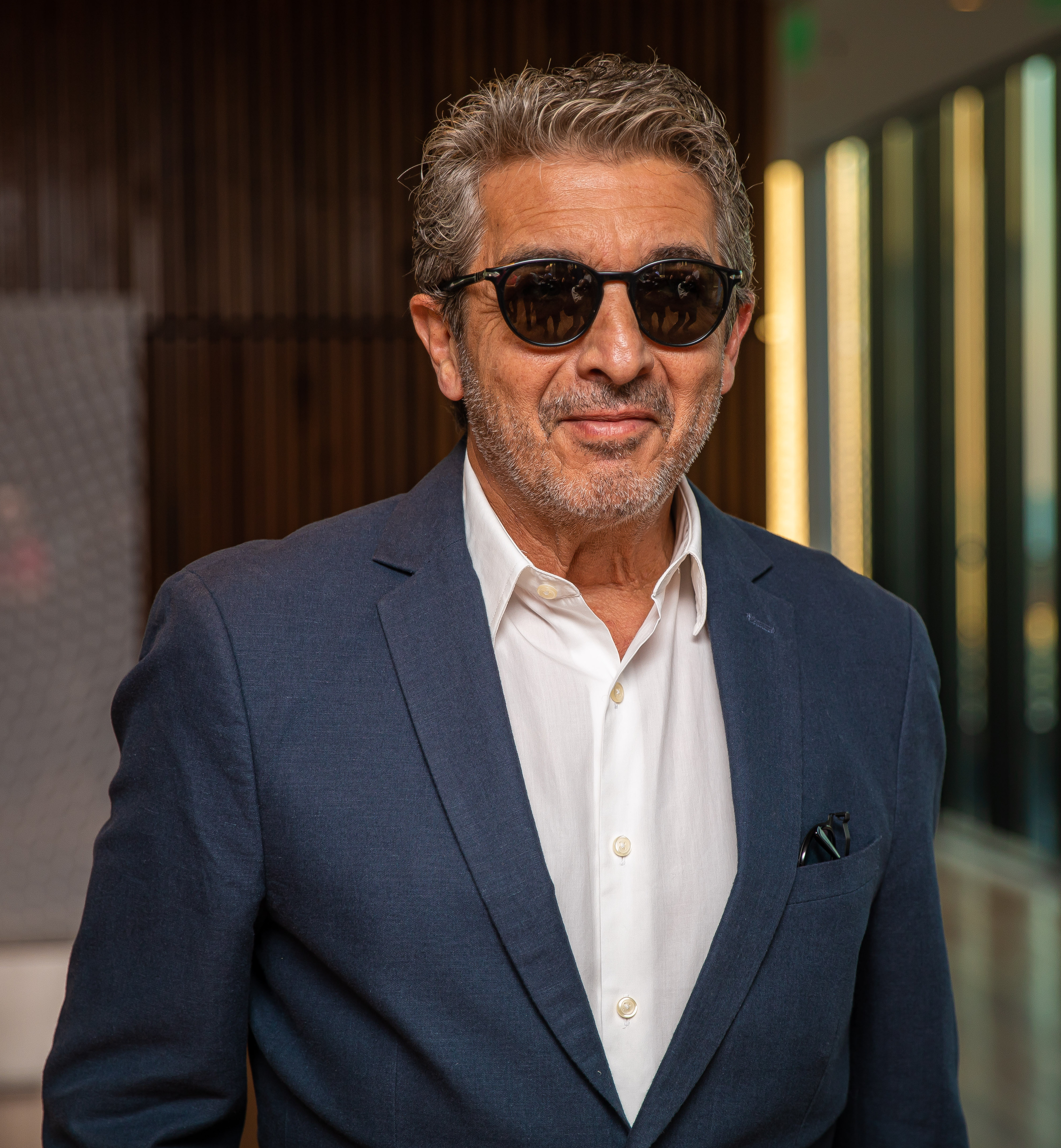
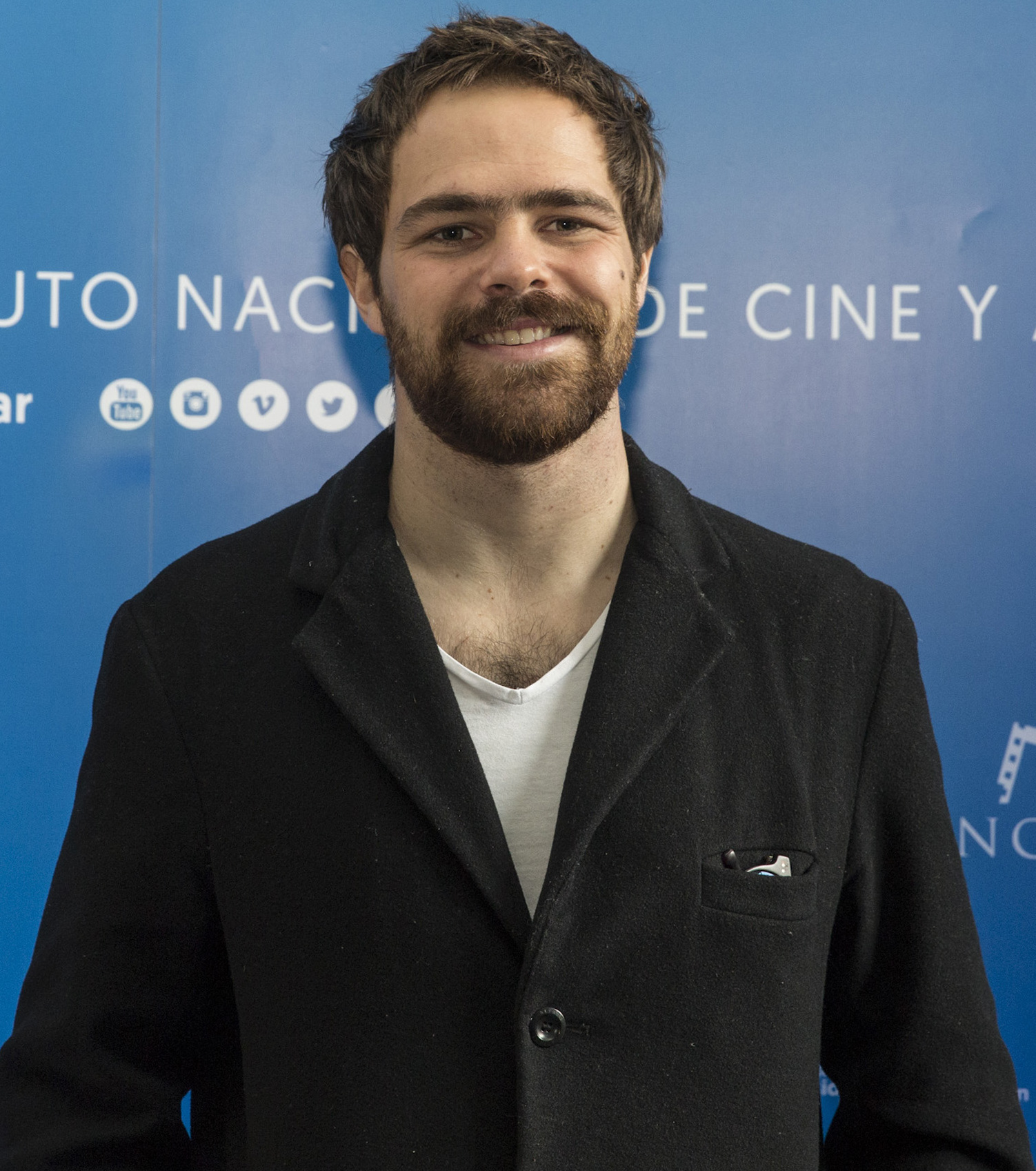
Ricardo Darín and Peter Lanzani play chief prosecutor Julio César Strassera and deputy prosecutor Luis Moreno Ocampo, respectively
- Ricardo Darín as Julio César Strassera: the chief prosecutor of the Trial of the Juntas.
- Peter Lanzani as Luis Moreno Ocampo: Strassera's deputy prosecutor, whose family sympathizes with the military.
- Alejandra Flechner as Silvia: Strassera's wife. The character is based on Marisa Tobar.
- Gina Mastronicola as Verónica Strassera: Strassera's daughter. The character is based on Carolina Strassera.
- Santiago Armas as Javier Strassera: Strassera's son. The character is based on Julián Strassera.
- Laura Paredes as Adriana Calvo: a woman who gave birth while kidnapped by the military government during the dictatorship and a key witness for the trial.
- Carlos Portaluppi as León Arslanián: the president of the court
- Susana Pampín as Magda: Moreno Ocampo's mother, who sides with the military
- Claudio Da Passano as Carlos "Somi" Somigliana: a playwright that helps Strassera write his final speech
- Héctor Díaz as Basile: one of the military junta's defense attorneys
- Gabriel Fernández as Bruzzo: a political operator for Raúl Alfonsín's government. The character is fictional, with his actions in the film being taken from different real-life political operative.
- Norman Briski as "Ruso": Strassera's mentor. The character was created for the film.
- Alejo García Pintos and Walter Jakob as two of the trial's judges

Several young actors appear as part of Strassera's team, dubbed the "fiscalitos" (transl. little prosecutors): Almudena González as Judith König, in charge of answering the phone; Félix Santamaría as Carlos "Maco" Somigliana, son of Carlos Somigliana; Manuel Caponi as Lucas Palacios; Santiago Rovito as Eduardo Manera; Brian Sichel as Federico Corrales; and Antonia Bengoechea as María Eugenia. Bengoechea is Darín's niece.

Leyla Bechara appears as Isabel; the film was her first acting experience. Paula Ransenberg plays Susana, Strassera's secretary. Guillermo Jacubowicz plays Hormiga, Javier's bodyguard. Additionally, Marcelo Pozzi appears as Jorge Rafael Videla, Jorge Gregorio as Orlando Ramón Agosti, Joselo Bella as Emilio Eduardo Massera, Sergio Sánchez as Jorge Isaac Anaya, Marcelo López as Basilio Lami Dozo, Carlos Ihler as Leopoldo Fortunato Galtieri, Héctor Balcone as Roberto Eduardo Viola, and Jorge Varas as Armando Lambruschini—the members of the military junta. Pepe Arias portrays journalist Bernardo Neustadt, who interviews Moreno Ocampo. Fernando Contigiani plays Pablo Díaz, a survivor of the Night of the Pencils and a witness for the trial.

== Production ==
=== Development ===
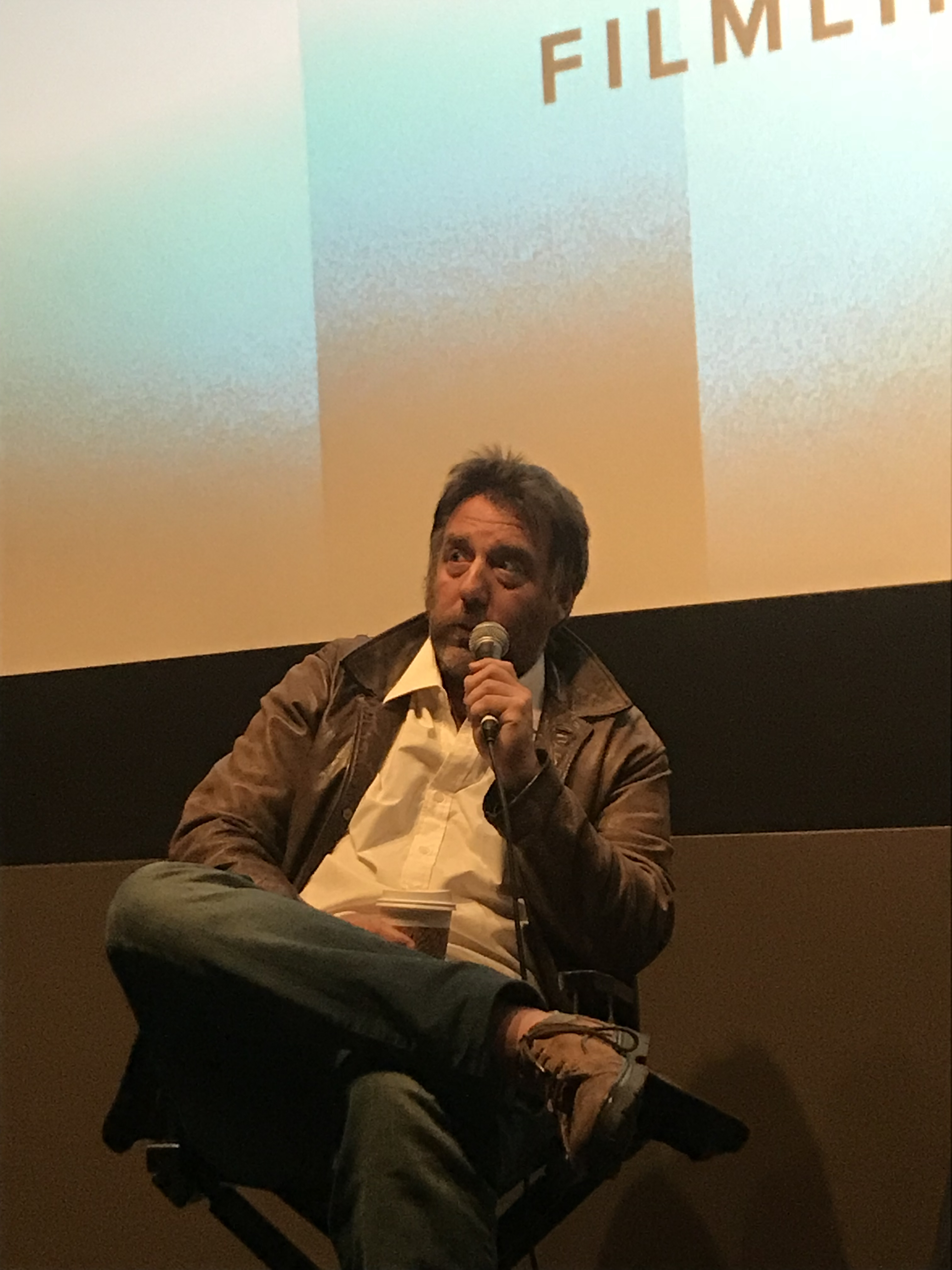
Mariano Llinás, co-writer of the film

Martín Rodríguez, journalist, writer, political analyst and a friend of director Santiago Mitre, originally gave him the suggestion to make a film about the Trial of the Juntas in 2016. Rodríguez joined the project as a historical researcher and adviser, and later brought screenwriter, producer and journalist Federico Scigliano on as a collaborator, working throughout 2017. They constructed a "'state of the art' on debates and discussions around the trial and the time", offering "possible ideas, entry points, and threads" on the subject which had a certain level of topicality. Their work took place in the early stages of development, when the story had not yet taken shape. They centered their work on the trial itself as a founding event of Argentine democracy. Their methodology consisted of interviewing many of the people who had participated in the trial and were still alive, such as Luis Moreno Ocampo, León Arslanián, Judith König, Carlos "Maco" Somigliana, and Enrique "Coti" Nosiglia, who served as Minister of the Interior for president Raúl Alfonsín in 1987. Mitre attended some of those interviews, during which he searched for possible lines of dialogue and narratives, such as when Moreno Ocampo told them that his mother "attended mass with [Jorge Rafael] Videla". Mitre spoke to the judges of the trial, as well as witnesses and members of the prosecutorial team, to understand their emotions at the time. He also met with Strassera's son Julián.

Work on the screenplay began around five years before the film's release, with Mitre starting the first draft during the editing stage of his previous film, The Summit (2017). Originally, writer Mariano Llinás and Mitre conceived the film to be a more episodic hyperlink film, with "several intertwined stories", changing points of view, time jumps, mixing genres and including fantastical elements, but producer Axel Kuschevatzky told them the film should be more classical in nature and focus solely on the trial, which Llinás considered liberating because it opened the door to comedic segments. He nonetheless had difficulty writing the script, as it was based on real events, many of its characters were still alive, and the public had differing opinions on the subject.

Mitre mentioned political thrillers All the President's Men (1976) and The Post (2017) as influences for "the tension of contemporary cinema" and "a very energetic concept of group work", as well as the Chilean film No (2012), which is also about a democratic transition in Latin America. Kuschevatzky also brought up Steven Spielberg, Otto Preminger, and Costa-Gavras as filmmakers they considered influential for Argentina, 1985. John Ford was cited as a reference for the film for his tradition of classical cinema and comedic tone.

=== Pre-production ===
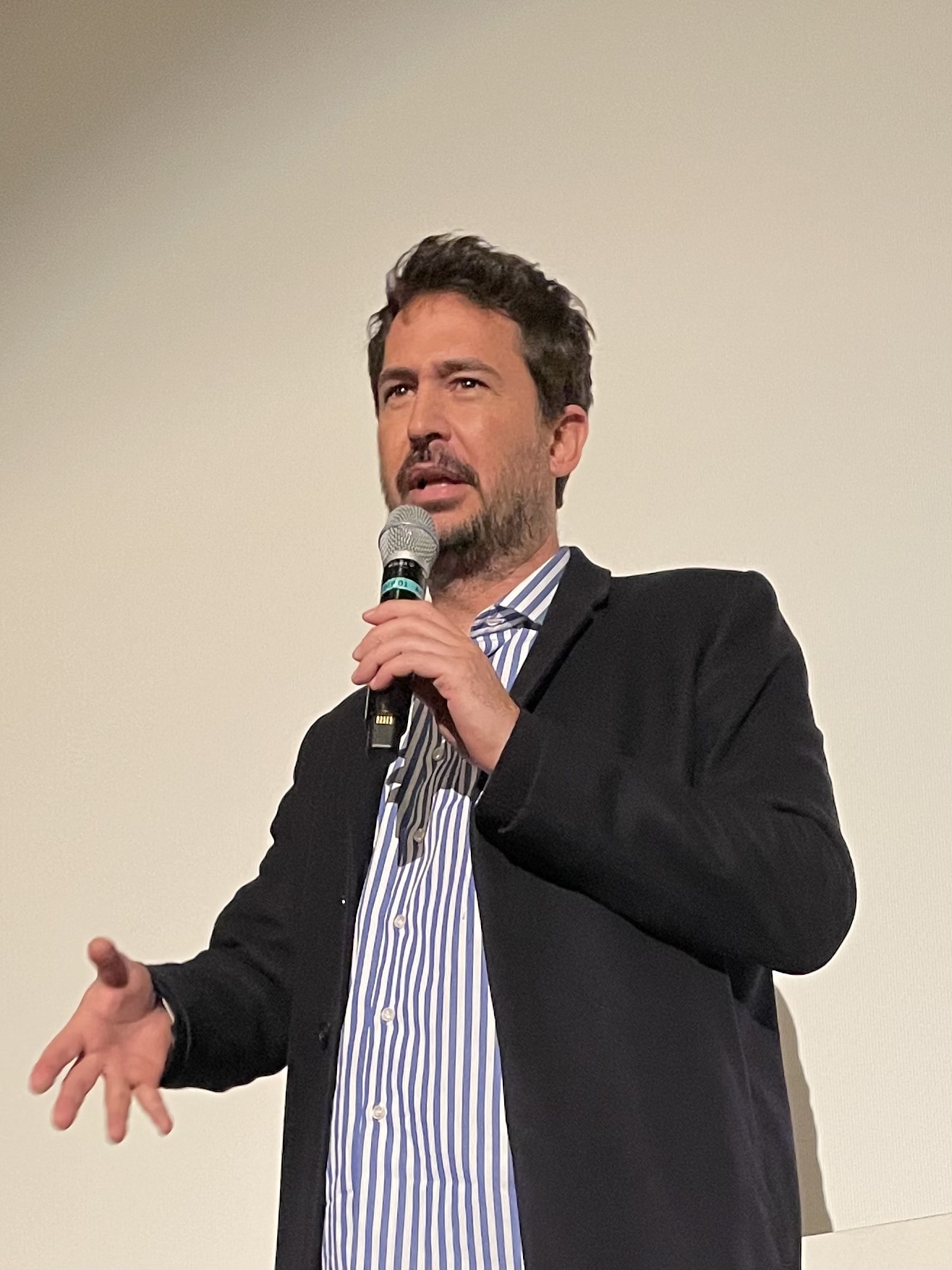
Santiago Mitre, co-writer, director, and producer of the film

Actor Ricardo Darín, who had become friends with Mitre after starring in The Summit, suggested playing Strassera when Mitre first presented him the idea to adapt the events of the Trial of the Juntas. After reading the first draft of the script, Darín took the role, despite generally not being interested in playing characters based on real people, and became a producer on the film as well. To play Moreno Ocampo, Kuschevatzky suggested his longtime friend, actor Peter Lanzani, whom Mitre cast in the role as he considered him "one of the most interesting actors of his generation". Mariana Mitre, the film's casting director and the director's sister, opted to get unknown actors for the supporting roles of both the young investigators and the testifiers, to have "the best possible sense of verisimilitude". Mitre, along with Darín and Lanzani, decided not to have them mimic the voice and mannerisms of the actual Strassera and Moreno Ocampo, taking artistic liberty with their performances. Similarly, Laura Paredes initially tried to imitate Adriana Calvo's actual tone of voice but found it made the performance seem artificial and disconnected. She then opted to speak closer to her own tone instead, which "paradoxically" made her resemble the character more.

Conversations with Amazon Studios began in 2020 amid the COVID-19 pandemic lockdown. Amazon joined the project as a production company once the script was already finished and the casting was already determined. The film did not make use of funding by the National Institute of Cinema and Audiovisual Arts (INCAA), as suggested by Amazon given they could finance it on their own. The film's original title was just 1985 but was changed to Argentina, 1985 after Amazon's involvement out of a necessity for clarity about the film's subject. Long-time Marvel Studios producer Victoria Alonso joined the project after watching a first version of the film, which she considered to be "a pending subject", and donated her salary to the making of the film.

=== Filming ===
Production was originally scheduled to begin in 2020, but it was delayed due to the pandemic. Pre-production took place entirely virtually, and the crew met for the first time on set. Filming began in June 2021 and lasted 10 weeks until September, taking place primarily in Buenos Aires, as well as in Rosario, Santa Fe, for two days and in Salta for four days. The film was shot at the locations where the real events took place, such as the original courtroom at Tribunales, which looked "practically the same" as it did in 1985. Strassera's apartment and office were sets built for the film.

The same type of U-matic cameras that had originally been used to broadcast the trial were also used for its recreation during the trial scenes, to be able to seamlessly insert archival footage of the actual trial. Javier Juliá, the cinematographer, did not want the film to look "old, or nostalgic", instead going for a more contemporary look. He also chose not to mimic the actual archive footage from the trial, in which witnesses were filmed from behind for protection, as he and Mitre wanted to make the audience "feel they were there bearing witness too". Juliá employed a large format lens with a shallower depth of field to focus on the witnesses instead of on the context around them; he shot the courtroom scenes with an Arri Alexa LF and Signature Prime lenses, using "classic and restrained camera movement" such as dolly tracks and cranes. For contrast, Juliá captured the scenes outside the courtroom with the Alexa LF and vintage Canon FD lenses. He shot with wider lenses, which brought "texture and rawness" to the footage, and hand-held camera movements to convey "the energy amongst the legal team or the tension in the Strassera household". The film was shot in a 3:2 aspect ratio, commonly used by classic 35-mm film cameras, which made them frame the film differently and helped them avoid a feeling of nostalgia.

Argentina, 1985 was Micaela Saiegh's first time as an art director in a period film, having previously worked in the genre as an assistant. Mitre wanted the film not to have an aesthetic typical of the eighties despite taking place in that decade. According to Saiegh, her job was "to be invisible", not to let her work stand out from the rest of the film and overshadow the story.

== Music ==
Spanish composer Pedro Osuna started working with Mitre's team in March 2022, writing the main themes of the music in four days, during post-production for the film. He announced in July 2022 that he would compose the soundtrack for the film, marking his first time as the composer of a film score. Osuna was recommended by Alonso and composer Michael Giacchino, who served as musical producer for the film and had worked with Osuna in Thor: Love and Thunder (2022) and Lightyear (2022). Osuna said his purpose with the score was to connect "the viewer's subconscious with history" and to communicate the danger that those involved in the trial were at the time.

The soundtrack contains a bonus track, a song titled "Nunca más," co-written and co-produced by Osuna, Alonso, songwriter Rafa Arcaute, and Puerto Rican singer-songwriter Kany García, who performs the song as well. García described working on the song as "one of the greatest challenges" she faced as a musician, as she felt there was a need to treat the subject as if she had experienced the event herself. The soundtrack album was released on digital platforms on 20 October 2022.

Several known Argentine songs from the 1980s are featured in the film: "Salir de la melancolía" (1981) by Serú Girán, "Lunes por la madrugada" and "Himno de mi corazón" (both 1984) by Los Abuelos de la Nada, and "Inconsciente colectivo" (1982) by Charly García.

== Release ==
Argentina, 1985 had its world premiere in the main competition for the Golden Lion at the 79th Venice International Film Festival on 3 September 2022. The film was also screened as part of the 'Perlak' lineup at the 70th San Sebastián International Film Festival on 18 September 2022. It was theatrically released in Argentina on 29 September 2022. Amazon Studios released the film in select theaters in the United States on 30 September 2022, before it started streaming on Prime Video on 21 October 2022.

In June 2022, distributor Sony Pictures label Stage 6 Films announced Argentina, 1985 would be released in Argentina on 29 September 2022. In August 2022, it was revealed that the film would be released on Prime Video on 21 October, being exclusively in theaters for three weeks only. Later in August, Sony announced it would no longer be distributing the film, with local company Digicine stepping in as distributor and keeping its original release date. Due to the short window of exclusivity, international theater chains Cinemark-Hoyts, Cinépolis, and Showcase Cinemas refused to show the film. However, local companies and independent theaters did screen the film. Llinás argued that the international chains' decision not to show the film ironically helped give the film "a certain mythical stature", with people having to form long lines outside the theaters to see the film due to the reduced number of venues.

The film was made available to stream on Prime Video for free in Argentina during 24 March 2023, the Day of Remembrance for Truth and Justice.

=== Educational screenings ===
In an initiative proposed by a history teacher at the Instituto de Enseñanza Superior en Lenguas Vivas «Juan Ramón Fernández» (IESLVJRF), the National Institute of Cinema and Audiovisual Arts held special screenings of the film at its Cine Gaumont theater. Film cast and staff were invited to speak to students and interact with them at these screenings, held as part of an ethics, civics and democracy education program. To prepare for the field trip, students were taught about the juntas and the dictatorship to provide them with the necessary historical context, since "for the kids who were born in 2010, [the subject] is like ancient Egypt". Subsequently, students would be assigned follow-up schoolwork such as making timelines, comics and art work, depending on their school year. Approximately 500 IESLVJRF students attended the first screening, with other schools scheduled to follow.

== Reception ==
=== Box office ===
In its first weekend in theaters in Argentina, the film debuted at number one at the box office and was seen by over 200,000 spectators in 298 theaters, making it the best opening for a local film since the start of the COVID-19 pandemic. During its second weekend, the film maintained the top spot at the box office with over 211,000 viewers in 314 theaters. By November 2022, the film had sold over a million tickets in Argentina and grossed 592 million pesos. It was the most-watched Argentine film of 2022, and the ninth-most-watched film overall in Argentina in 2022. According to the National Institute of Cinema and Audiovisual Arts (INCAA), it ended its local theatrical run with 1,151,336 viewers and grossed 658,923,794 pesos.

Internationally, the film grossed US$905,893. It opened in 59 theaters in Spain, where it grossed €98,075 (US$96,133) in its opening weekend. It ended its theatrical run in Spain with 144,300 viewers and €838,500 (US$871,621). It was also screened in 11 theaters in Italy, opening to US$11,148 and ending its theatrical run with US$34,272.

=== Critical response ===
According to the review aggregation website Rotten Tomatoes, Argentina, 1985 has a 96% approval rating based on 70 reviews from critics, with an average rating of 8/10. The site's consensus reads, "Justice is served in Argentina, 1985, a crusading courtroom drama that shines a light on historically somber times with refreshing levity". On Metacritic, which uses a weighted average, the film holds a score of 78 out of 100 based on 11 reviews, indicating "generally favorable" reviews.

Guillermo Courau from La Nación, in a five-star review, called Argentina, 1985 a "necessary film" and noted how it balanced faithfulness to the real events with the creative liberties taken. Juan Pablo Cinelli of Página 12 wrote that Argentina, 1985 worked as a political film but stayed focused on the trial itself, with the political context functioning as "an increasingly suffocating bubble" around it. Carlos Aguilar from TheWrap praised the film's execution and considered it to be a crowd-pleaser, crowd-pleaser, a label with which Pablo O. Scholz from Clarín concurred.

The performances of the cast also received praise. Scholz commended the authenticity of the performances, as did Michael Ordoña from the Los Angeles Times, who thought the characters' humanity was particularly present in the depiction of Strassera as an ordinary man. Ordoña described Strassera's characterization as "interestingly uninteresting", which he considered a rare feat. The Hollywood Reporter's Sheri Linden thought Darín's portrayal of Strassera, along with Mitre's direction, effectively conveyed the high stakes of the trial depicted in the film. Writing for The Guardian, Peter Bradshaw gave the film four-out-of-five stars, highlighting Darín's acting and praising Lanzani's "attractive and sympathetic" performance. He also felt the presence of the young legal team gave the film more energy. Guy Lodge at Variety highlighted Darín for Strassera's final speech, which he considered "one of the most riveting, hair-raising scenes of speechifying in recent cinema". Writing for IndieWire, Sophie Monks Kaufman gave the film a "B+" and felt that Darín's performance was the main force of the film, uniting all of its different elements.

The film's use of humor was generally praised by critics. Courau felt that humor was integrated as part of the characters' reality instead of as a gag or comic relief, and Ordoña praised the presence of "the humor of everyday life" in the film. For Scholz, Mitre successfully used humor to "demystify" the narrated events. Monks Kaufman pointed out its shifts in tone, contrasting the seriousness of the trial scenes with the "Ally McBeal-esque irreverence" of Strassera's personal life.

Mariana Mactas of TN praised the ensemble cast, pacing, dialogue, and staging, and all its elements in general. Monks Kaufman highlighted the "nostalgic warmth" of the set design. Aguilar noted the dynamism of Andrés P. Estrada's editing and the insertion of real archive footage "as if past and present converged in the same instant". Lodge praised Llinás's concise script and considered Juliá's cinematography, Saiegh's art direction, and Estrada's editing were responsible for the film's "cinematic sweep and scope". Linden considered that Juliá's cinematography and Pedro Osuna's musical score were the main elements that contributed an atmosphere of unease to the film.

Scholz thought the film took elements of classical cinema from both Argentina and the Golden Age of Hollywood. The use of Hollywood conventions in Argentina, 1985 received both compliments and criticism. Cinelli suggested Mitre employed humor as well as classical cinema tropes as a way to facilitate the audience's connection to the story. Lodge also believed that Argentina, 1985 was more classical in its storytelling than other films dealing with the same subject matter, likening Mitre to filmmakers such as Aaron Sorkin and Steven Spielberg. Lodge commended Mitre's direction for balancing the emotion of the main story and the tension of secondary plots. Bradshaw felt that Argentina, 1985 had "a fair bit of Hollywoodised emotion" but that the film managed it well. Linden criticized the occasional appearance of legal drama tropes among other aspects of the screenplay, such as underdeveloped supporting characters and instances of flat dialogue. Aguilar thought the film lacking in innovation and the final product "overly familiar", visually and narratively.

=== Accolades ===
| Award | Date of ceremony | Category | Recipient(s) | Result | Ref. |
|---|---|---|---|---|---|
| Academy Awards | 12 March 2023 | Best International Feature Film | Argentina, 1985 | Nominated | |
| Ariel Awards | 9 September 2023 | Best Ibero-American Film | Argentina, 1985 | Won | |
| BFI London Film Festival | 16 October 2022 | Best Film | Argentina, 1985 | Nominated | |
| British Academy Film Awards | 19 February 2023 | Best Film Not in the English Language | Santiago Mitre | Nominated | |
| CEC Medals | 6 February 2023 | Best Foreign Film | Argentina, 1985 | Won | |
| Critics' Choice Movie Awards | 15 January 2023 | Best Foreign Language Film | Argentina, 1985 | Nominated | |
| Dallas–Fort Worth Film Critics Association | 19 December 2022 | Best Foreign Language Film | Argentina, 1985 | 3rd place | |
| Forqué Awards | 17 December 2022 | Best Latin-American Film | Argentina, 1985 | Won | |
| Georgia Film Critics Association | 13 January 2023 | Best International Film | Argentina, 1985 | Nominated | |
| Golden Globe Awards | 10 January 2023 | Best Foreign Language Film | Argentina, 1985 | Won | |
| Golden Reel Awards | 26 February 2023 | Outstanding Achievement in Sound Editing – Foreign Language Feature | Santiago Fumagalli, Juan Ignacio Giobio, Nahuel De Camillis, Ignacio Seligra, Nicolás Mannara, Diego Marcone, Stephen M. Davis | Nominated | |
| Golden Trailer Awards | 29 June 2023 | Best Foreign Trailer | "Courage" (Wild Card) | Nominated | |
| Goya Awards | 11 February 2023 | Best Ibero-American Film | Argentina, 1985 | Won | |
| Grande Prêmio do Cinema Brasileiro | 23 August 2023 | Best Ibero-American Film | Argentina, 1985 | Won | |
| Hollywood Critics Association Awards | 24 February 2023 | Best International Film | Argentina, 1985 | Nominated | |
| Houston Film Critics Society | 18 February 2023 | Best Foreign Language Feature | Argentina, 1985 | Nominated | |
| Location Managers Guild Awards | 26 August 2023 | Outstanding Locations in a Contemporary Film | Argentina, 1985 | Nominated | |
| National Board of Review | 8 December 2022 | Top Five Foreign Language Films | Argentina, 1985 | Won | |
| National Board of Review | 8 December 2022 | Freedom of Expression Award | Argentina, 1985 | Won | |
| Platino Awards | 22 April 2023 | Best Ibero-American Film | Argentina, 1985 | Won | |
| Platino Awards | 22 April 2023 | Best Director | Santiago Mitre | Nominated | |
| Platino Awards | 22 April 2023 | Best Actor | Ricardo Darín | Won | |
| Platino Awards | 22 April 2023 | Best Actor | Peter Lanzani | Nominated | |
| Platino Awards | 22 April 2023 | Best Supporting Actor | Carlos Portaluppi | Nominated | |
| Platino Awards | 22 April 2023 | Best Supporting Actor | Norman Briski | Nominated | |
| Platino Awards | 22 April 2023 | Best Supporting Actress | Alejandra Flechner | Nominated | |
| Platino Awards | 22 April 2023 | Best Screenplay | Santiago Mitre, Mariano Llinás | Won | |
| Platino Awards | 22 April 2023 | Best Original Score | Pedro Osuna | Nominated | |
| Platino Awards | 22 April 2023 | Best Cinematography | Javier Juliá | Nominated | |
| Platino Awards | 22 April 2023 | Best Art Direction | Micaela Saiegh | Won | |
| Platino Awards | 22 April 2023 | Best Film Editing | Andrés Pepe Estrada | Nominated | |
| Platino Awards | 22 April 2023 | Best Sound | Santiago Fumagalli | Nominated | |
| Platino Awards | 22 April 2023 | Film and Education Values | Argentina, 1985 | Won | |
| Rolling Stone en Español Awards | 26 October 2023 | Fiction Feature Film of the Year | Argentina, 1985 | Nominated | |
| Rolling Stone en Español Awards | 26 October 2023 | Director of the Year | Santiago Mitre | Nominated | |
| Rolling Stone en Español Awards | 26 October 2023 | Performance of the Year | Ricardo Darín | Won | |
| Rolling Stone en Español Awards | 26 October 2023 | Performance of the Year | Peter Lanzani | Nominated | |
| San Francisco Bay Area Film Critics Circle | 9 January 2023 | Best International Feature Film | Argentina, 1985 | Nominated | |
| San Sebastián International Film Festival | 24 September 2022 | Audience Award | Argentina, 1985 | Won | |
| Sant Jordi Awards | 25 April 2023 | Best Foreign Film | Argentina, 1985 | Won | |
| Satellite Awards | 3 March 2023 | Best Motion Picture – International | Argentina, 1985 | Won | |
| Silver Condor Awards | 22 May 2023 | Best Fiction Film | Argentina, 1985 | Won | |
| Silver Condor Awards | 22 May 2023 | BA Audiovisual Audience Award | Argentina, 1985 | Won | |
| Silver Condor Awards | 22 May 2023 | Best Director | Santiago Mitre | Won | |
| Silver Condor Awards | 22 May 2023 | Best Actor | Ricardo Darín | Won | |
| Silver Condor Awards | 22 May 2023 | Best Actor | Peter Lanzani | Nominated | |
| Silver Condor Awards | 22 May 2023 | Best Supporting Actress | Alejandra Flechner | Nominated | |
| Silver Condor Awards | 22 May 2023 | Best Supporting Actress | Laura Paredes | Won | |
| Silver Condor Awards | 22 May 2023 | Best Supporting Actor | Norman Briski | Won | |
| Silver Condor Awards | 22 May 2023 | Best Supporting Actor | Carlos Portaluppi | Nominated | |
| Silver Condor Awards | 22 May 2023 | Best Female Newcomer | Gina Mastronicola | Nominated | |
| Silver Condor Awards | 22 May 2023 | Best Male Newcomer | Santiago Armas Estevarena | Won | |
| Silver Condor Awards | 22 May 2023 | Best Original Screenplay | Santiago Mitre and Mariano Llinás | Won | |
| Silver Condor Awards | 22 May 2023 | Best Cinematography | Javier Juliá | Won | |
| Silver Condor Awards | 22 May 2023 | Best Editing | Andrés Pepe Estrada | Won | |
| Silver Condor Awards | 22 May 2023 | Best Casting | Mariana Mitre | Won | |
| Silver Condor Awards | 22 May 2023 | Best Sound Design | Santiago Fumagalli | Won | |
| Silver Condor Awards | 22 May 2023 | Best Original Score | Pedro Osuna | Nominated | |
| Silver Condor Awards | 22 May 2023 | Best Costume Design | Mónica Toschi | Won | |
| Silver Condor Awards | 22 May 2023 | Best Art Direction | Micaela Saiegh | Won | |
| Silver Condor Awards | 22 May 2023 | Best Makeup and Hairstyling | Dino Balanzino and Angela Garacija | Won | |
| Venice International Film Festival | 10 September 2022 | Golden Lion | Santiago Mitre | Nominated | |
| Venice International Film Festival | 10 September 2022 | FIPRESCI Award | Santiago Mitre | Won | |
| Venice International Film Festival | 10 September 2022 | SIGNIS Award Special Mention | Santiago Mitre | Won | |

== See also ==
- List of Argentine films of 2022
- List of submissions to the 95th Academy Awards for Best International Feature Film
- List of Argentine submissions for the Academy Award for Best International Feature Film
- The Official Story – 1985 film also dealing with the dictatorship that won the country's first Academy Award
