= NBR Freedom of Expression =

Annual award given by the National Board of Review

Freedom of Expression Award is an annual award given by the National Board of Review since 1995.

== List of winners ==
=== 1990s ===
- 1995: Zhang Yimou
- 1996: The People vs. Larry Flynt
- 1997: Red Corner
- 1998: Bernardo Bertolucci
- 1999: The Insider

=== 2000s ===
- 2000: Bamboozled, Before Night Falls, The Circle, Kadosh, Quills, Sound and Fury, A Time for Drunken Horses, The Visit
- 2001: Baran, Jung in the Land of the Mujaheddin, Kandahar
- 2002: Ararat, Bloody Sunday, The Grey Zone, Rabbit-Proof Fence
- 2003: Capturing the Friedmans, Dirty Pretty Things, The Magdalene Sisters, September 11
- 2004: Fahrenheit 9/11, The Passion of the Christ, Conspiracy of Silence
- 2005: Innocent Voices, The Untold Story of Emmett Louis Till
- 2006: Water, World Trade Center
- 2007: The Great Debaters, Persepolis
- 2008: Trumbo
- 2009: Burma VJ, Invictus, The Most Dangerous Man in America

=== 2010s ===
- 2010: Fair Game, Conviction, Howl
- 2011: Crime After Crime, Pariah
- 2012: The Central Park Five, Promised Land
- 2013: Wadjda
- 2014: Rosewater, Selma
- 2015: Beasts of No Nation, Mustang
- 2016: Cameraperson
- 2017: First They Killed My Father, Let It Fall: Los Angeles 1982–1992
- 2018: 22 July, On Her Shoulders
- 2019: For Sama, Just Mercy

=== 2020s ===
- 2020: One Night in Miami
- 2021: Flee
- 2022: All the Beauty and the Bloodshed, Argentina, 1985
- 2023: No film was selected
- 2024: No Other Land
- 2025: Put Your Soul on Your Hand and Walk
