= The Guest (2014 Chilean film) =

- Chilean theatrical release poster
- La visita
- Directed by: Mauricio López Fernández
- Written by: Mauricio López Fernández
- Produced by: Rebeca Gutiérrez Campos; Federico Sande Novo; Nicolás Grosso
- Starring: Daniela Vega; Claudia Cantero; Rosa Ramírez; Paulo Brunetti; Carmen Barros
- Cinematography: Diego Poleri
- Music by: Alekos Vuskovic
- Production companies: Pinda Producciones; Le Tiro Cine
- Release date: December 18, 2014
- Running time: 82 minutes
- Country: Chile
- Language: Spanish

The Guest (Spanish: La visita) is a 2014 Chilean drama film written and directed by Mauricio López Fernández. The worldwide premiere was in October 2014 in competition at the Valdivia International Film Festival and later, in 2015, it was presented at the Guadalajara International Film Festival, Outfest, CinéLatino Toulouse and, also in France, at the Rencontres du Cinéma Sud-Américain, Marseille, when it won the First Prize for Best Film and Best Actress for Daniela Vega in her film debut.

== Plot ==
In an old house on the outskirts of Santiago, a wake is being held for Coya's husband. Coya is the maid who has served the family for many years and is considered a part of it. The family is waiting for Felipe, Coya's only son, to arrive. However, they are surprised to discover that Felipe has transitioned and now goes by the name Elena, a trans woman. This unexpected revelation becomes more important than the wake itself and completely upsets the conservative family, unleashing conflicts and frustrations that even reach Tete, the owner of the house, who is also suffering due to her husband's infidelity.

== Cast ==
- Daniela Vega, as Elena
- Claudia Cantero, as "Tete"
- Rosa Ramírez, as Coya
- Paulo Brunetti, as Enrique
- Carmen Barros, as the grandma
