= Inconsciente colectivo =

Song by Charly García

"Inconsciente colectivo" (Spanish: Collective unconscious) is a well known rock song from Argentine musician Charly García, first recorded in 1982, as the end of the album "Yendo de la cama al living", second solo album of his career, considered by the Rolling Stone magazine as the No. 26 between best Albums of Argentine rock, though edited together as a double album with the first, "Pubis angelical", recorded two months earlier. The song was released in the year 1980, at Luna Park for a Serú Girán concert. On December 26, 1981, when Seru played at the Coliseo theater, Garcia introduced this song saying "Well, now I'll play a song ... I'm asked for it a lot ... and I'm going to play it ...", so it is proved that a year before its release, the song already had some degree of popularity. This version appears on the album "Yo no quiero volverme tan loco", published in 2000, is sung at a higher pitch (A), while the original version is in G.

The song gained particular notoriety when it was sung by the famous folk singer Mercedes Sosa, as closing concert presentation of the album, the December 26, 1982 at Ferro Carril Oeste Stadium, a historic event, for its political and cultural significance. The following year she included in its 1983 album (Mercedes Sosa), on the line to break the prejudice of non mixture of rock and Argentine folklore and the letter giving a clear political significance as a metaphor for the new democratic era which began to anticipate, after the collapse of the National Reorganization Process. The song was also played by Fabiana Cantilo. It was also featured in the film Argentina, 1985.
