= Gloria (2013 film) =

2013 film

- Theatrical release poster
- Directed by: Sebastián Lelio
- Written by: Gonzalo Maza; Sebastián Lelio
- Produced by: Juan de Dios Larraín; Pablo Larraín; Sebastián Lelio; Gonzalo Maza
- Starring: Paulina García
- Cinematography: Benjamín Echazarreta
- Edited by: Sebastián Lelio; Soledad Salfate
- Production company: Fábula
- Release dates: 10 February 2013 (Berlin); 9 May 2013 (Chile)
- Running time: 105 minutes (Berlin); 110 minutes
- Countries: Chile; Spain
- Language: Spanish

Gloria is a 2013 drama film produced, co-written and directed by Sebastián Lelio. Paulina García stars in the title role, a 58-year-old woman who starts dating again, 10 years after getting divorced. Sergio Hernández co-stars as her unreliable new boyfriend Rodolfo.

Gloria premiered on 10 February 2013 at the 63rd Berlin International Film Festival, where Garcia won the Silver Bear for Best Actress. The film was selected as the Chilean entry for the Best Foreign Language Film at the 86th Academy Awards, but it was not nominated. It won Best Ibero-American Film at the 1st Platino Awards. Lelio remade Gloria in English in 2018 as Gloria Bell, starring Julianne Moore and John Turturro.

== Plot ==
In Santiago, Chile, Gloria, a 58-year-old woman, decides she doesn't want to spend her days alone after 10 years of being divorced and with her children grown up. She starts attending singles discos where she meets Rodolfo, who runs an amusement park on the outskirts of the city. Despite being seven years older than Gloria and recently divorced, Rodolfo immediately begins a relationship with her. However, he remains extremely close to his two grown-up daughters who rely on him for full financial support, as neither of them has a job. Consequently, Rodolfo never turns off his mobile phone and answers it immediately if his daughters call, regardless of his location. During a date at his amusement park, the two share a kiss.

After a successful lunch with Rodolfo and her friends, Gloria introduces him to her family at a birthday dinner for her son, where her ex-husband Gabriel is also a guest. When asked about his career, Rodolfo struggles to keep up with the barrage of questions about his personal life, having served as an officer in the Chilean Navy. Following heavy drinking, Gloria becomes overly friendly with Gabriel, much to Rodolfo's discomfort. He excuses himself to answer a call from his daughter and doesn't return to the party. Furious, Gloria ends their relationship the following day. Rodolfo meets Gloria at her office to defend his actions at the party and reprimand her for her behavior.

After numerous unsuccessful attempts, Rodolfo finally convinces Gloria to go with him to a luxury hotel beside the sea in Viña del Mar. However, upon arriving in their room, one of Rodolfo's daughters calls to inform him that her mother has been in an accident and he needs to return home immediately. Despite Gloria's attempt to leave, Rodolfo stops her, saying he won't abandon their relationship. They then have sex after she strips.

That night, they head down to the hotel dining room and make plans to go on vacation as a couple. Despite Rodolfo's phone ringing continuously, he refuses to answer it. Gloria asks to see his phone and drops it into his soup, after which Rodolfo excuses himself from the table. Gloria assumes he's gone to the men's room, but he never returns. Upset, Gloria heads to the bar and drinks heavily, leading to a wild night at the casino, disco, and through the city streets. She wakes up with a terrible hangover on the beach the next morning, only to find out that Rodolfo has checked out and the room, no longer available. She calls her cleaning lady, Victoria, to come and get her, and they return to Santiago by bus several hours later.

Upon returning home, Rodolfo repeatedly tries to contact Gloria without success. Gloria retrieves one of Rodolfo's paintball guns from her trash bin and puts it back in her car. She drives to his house and splatters the front with green paintballs before shooting Rodolfo in the groin as he tries to enter the house with groceries. His family runs out in horror and yells obscenities at Gloria, who then rushes back to her car and drives away. She then heads to a wedding she had originally planned to attend, arriving midway through the reception. Her friends express gratitude and encourage her to enjoy the party. Despite declining numerous invitations to dance, Gloria stands up when the DJ plays her theme song, Gloria by Umberto Tozzi, and takes to the dance floor, allowing herself to get lost in the music.

== Cast ==
- Paulina García as Gloria Cumplido
- Sergio Hernández as Rodolfo Fernández
- Diego Fontecilla as Pedro
- Fabiola Zamora as Ana
- Alejandro Goic as Daniel
- Coca Guazzini as Luz
- Hugo Moraga as Hugo
- Luz Jiménez as Victoria
- Cristián Carvajal as Vecino
- Liliana García as Flavia
- Antonia Santa María as María
- Eyal Meyer as Theo
- Marcial Tagle as Marcial
- Marcela Said as Marcela
- Pablo Krögh as Pablo

== Reception ==
The film received positive reviews at the 2013 Berlin International Film Festival, topping both Screen International's Screen jury poll of international critics, and IndieWire's critics poll of the best films screened at Berlin in 2013. On Rotten Tomatoes the film has a 100% rating based on 129 reviews, with an average rating of 7.9/10. The site's consensus is "Marvelously directed by Sebastian Lelio and beautifully led by a powerful performance from Paulina Garcia, Gloria takes an honest, sweetly poignant look at a type of character that's all too often neglected in Hollywood." On Metacritic, the film holds a score of 83 out of 100, based on reviews from 30 critics.

David Rooney of The Hollywood Reporter writes "it’s hard to imagine anyone with a heart and a brain not responding to the quiet delights and stunning intimacy of Chilean director Sebastian Lelio’s account of the personal evolution of a 58-year-old divorcee, played with scrupulous honesty and intelligence by the wonderful Paulina Garcia" and "Funny, melancholy and ultimately uplifting, Sebastian Lelio's enormously satisfying spell inside the head and heart of a middle-aged woman never puts a foot wrong".

Variety writes "Perceptive and unerringly sympathetic, 'Gloria' has the makings of an arthouse sleeper".

Mark Adams of Screen International writes "A delightfully astute and compassionate delve into the life of a 58 year-old divorcee looking for company, romance and perhaps even love, director Sebastián Lelio’s engaging, amusing and oddly uplifting Gloria is a film that will strike a chord with audiences of a certain age. It is driven by a quite wonderful performance from Paulina Garcia, who should snag best actress awards at every festival the film plays at."

Eric Kohn of IndieWire gave the film an A and describes it as a "breakthrough" for actress Paulina Garcia.

== Awards ==
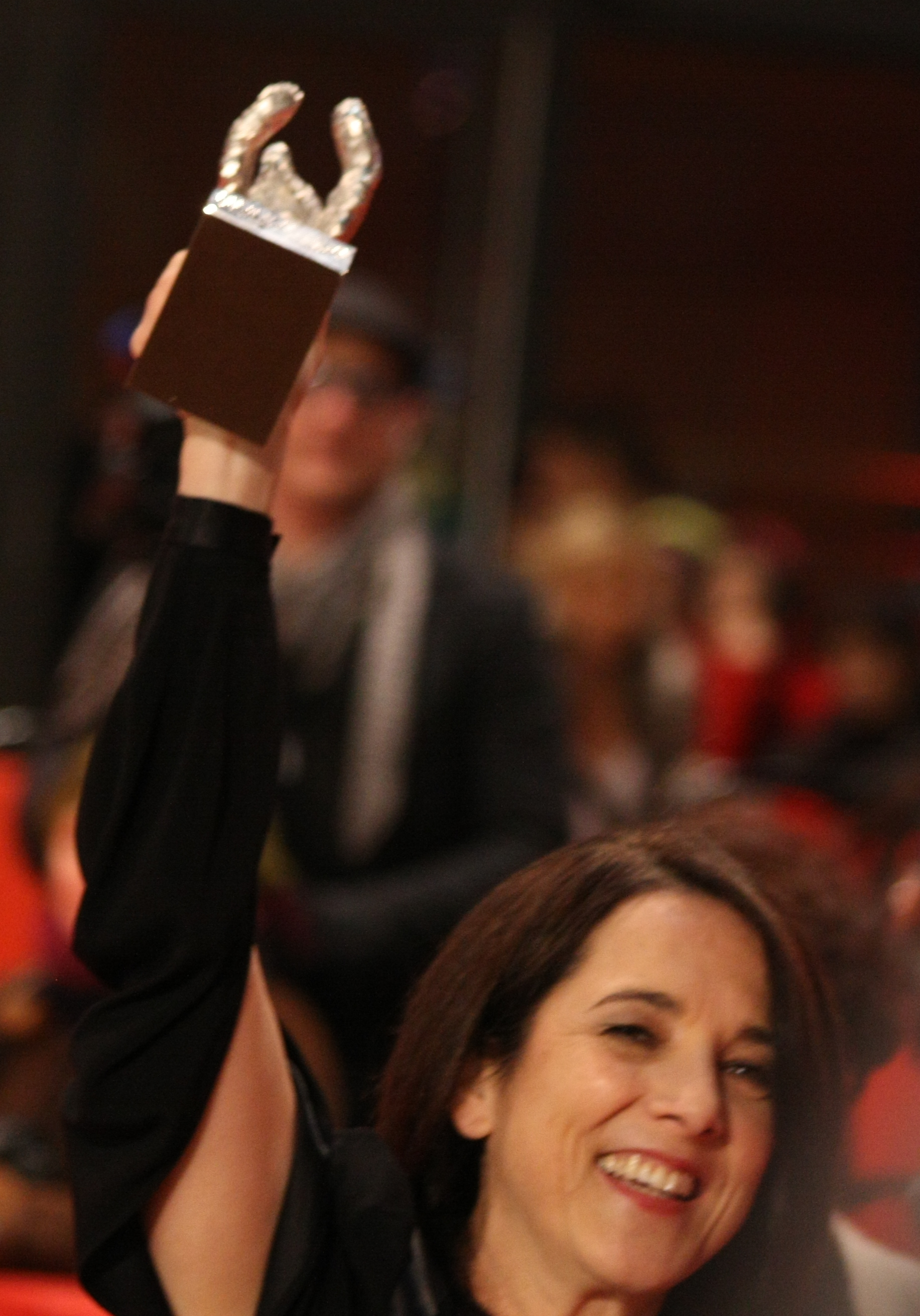
Garcia with her Silver Bear at the Berlinale

Year	Event	Recipient	Award	Result
2012	San Sebastian International Film Festival	Sebastián Lelio (director); Pablo Larraín (producer)	Films in Progress Award - Best Film	Won
2013	63rd Berlin International Film Festival	Paulina García	Silver Bear for Best Actress	Won
2013	63rd Berlin International Film Festival	Sebastián Lelio	Golden Bear	Nominated
2013	63rd Berlin International Film Festival	Sebastián Lelio	Jury Prize	Won
2013	Hawaii International Film Festival	Sebastián Lelio	Best Film	Nominated
2013	Hawaii International Film Festival	Paulina García	Best Actress	Won
2013	Independent Spirit Awards	Sebastián Lelio	Best Foreign Film	Nominated
2013	London Film Critics' Circle	Sebastián Lelio	Best Foreign Language Film	Nominated
2014	Goya Awards	Sebastián Lelio	Best Spanish Language Foreign Film	Nominated
2014	National Board of Review Awards	Sebastián Lelio	Top Foreign Films	Won
2014	Platino Awards	Sebastián Lelio	Best Ibero-American Film	Won
2014	Platino Awards	Sebastián Lelio	Best Director	Nominated
2014	Platino Awards	Paulina García	Best Actress	Won
2014	Platino Awards	Sebastián Lelio, Gonzalo Maza	Best Screenplay	Won

== See also ==
- List of submissions to the 86th Academy Awards for Best Foreign Language Film
- List of Chilean submissions for the Academy Award for Best Foreign Language Film
- Cinema of Chile
