= The Animal's Wife =

2016 film

- Film poster
- Directed by: Víctor Gaviria
- Written by: Víctor Gaviria
- Starring: Natalia Polo
- Release date: 12 September 2016 (TIFF)
- Running time: 116 minutes
- Country: Colombia
- Language: Spanish

The Animal's Wife (Spanish: La mujer del animal) is a 2016 Colombian drama film directed by Víctor Gaviria. It was screened in the Contemporary World Cinema section at the 2016 Toronto International Film Festival.

== Cast ==
- Natalia Polo as Amparo Gómez
- Tito Alexánder Gómez as Libardo Ramírez
