= Javier Juliá =

Argentine film cinematographer and film editor

Javier Juliá is an Argentine film cinematographer and film editor.

== Filmography ==
Cinematography

- Latidos (1993)
- Rubén, el murciélago (1993)
- Le molestaría si le hago una pregunta? (1994)
- Guarisove, los olvidados (1995)
- La simple razón (1995)
- Mala época (1998)
- Los libros y la noche (1999) a.k.a. The Books and the Night
- Película bruta (1999)
- El descanso (2002)
- Cama adentro (2004) a.k.a. Live-In Maid
- Iluminados por el fuego (2005) a.k.a. Blessed by Fire
- La cordillera (2017)
- Argentina, 1985 (2022)
- The Absence of Eden (2023)

Editing

- Cortázar (1994) a.k.a. Celestial Clockwork

== Awards ==
- Argentine Film Critics Association Awards: Silver Condor Best Editing; for Cortázar; (1994).
