= Letters from War (film) =

2016 film

- Film poster
- Cartas da Guerra
- Directed by: Ivo M. Ferreira
- Written by: Ivo M. Ferreira, Edgar Medina; António Lobo Antunes
- Based on: D'este viver aqui neste papel descripto by António Lobo Antunes
- Produced by: Luis Urbano
- Starring: Miguel Nunes; Margarida Vila-Nova; Ricardo Pereira; João Pedro Vaz; João Pedro Mamede; Gonçalo Carvalho; Francisco Hestnes
- Cinematography: João Ribeiro
- Edited by: Sandro Aguilar
- Production company: O Som e a Furia
- Distributed by: O Som e a Furia
- Release dates: 14 February 2016 (Berlinale); 1 September 2016 (Portugal)
- Running time: 105 minutes
- Country: Portugal
- Language: Portuguese
- Box office: $118,523

Letters from War (Portuguese: Cartas da Guerra) is a 2016 Portuguese drama film directed by Ivo M. Ferreira and based on the letter collection D'este viver aqui neste papel descripto by António Lobo Antunes. It was selected to compete for the Golden Bear at the 66th Berlin International Film Festival, where it had its world premiere. It was selected as the Portuguese entry for the Best Foreign Language Film at the 89th Academy Awards but it was not nominated.

== Cast ==
- Miguel Nunes as António
- Margarida Vila-Nova as Maria José
- Ricardo Pereira
- João Pedro Vaz
- João Pedro Mamede
- Simão Cayatte
- Isac Graça
- Gonçalo Carvalho
- Francisco Hestnes

== See also ==
- List of submissions to the 89th Academy Awards for Best Foreign Language Film
- List of Portuguese submissions for the Academy Award for Best Foreign Language Film
