= The Companion (2015 film) =

2015 film

- Film poster
- Directed by: Pavel Giroud
- Written by: Pavel Giroud
- Starring: Camila Arteche
- Release date: 3 October 2015 (Busan International Film Festival)
- Running time: 104 minutes
- Country: Cuba
- Language: Spanish

The Companion (Spanish: El acompañante) is a 2015 Cuban drama film directed by Pavel Giroud. It was selected as the Cuban entry for the Best Foreign Language Film at the 89th Academy Awards but it was not nominated.

== Cast ==
- Camila Arteche as Lisandra
- Armando Miguel Gómez
- Broselianda Hernández as La Madre
- Yotuel Romero
- Jazz Vilá as Boris

== Reception ==
Jonathan Holland at the The Hollywood Reporter called it "a universal tale of struggles against adversities” describing it as "an uncertain hybrid of prison drama and boxing comeback yarn." Chris Joseph at the Miami New Times reviewed it as a “handsomely directed film" that “largely succeeds thanks to solid performances and a story with a heart” although noting that it tried to be several films at the same time. At Remezcla, Manuel Betancourt called it “a sports redemptive drama” more concerned with its protagonist's comeback as a boxer than with the social issues of confinement in an AIDS sanatorium, while at the same time acknowledging the film was “mining new ground".

== Festivals & Awards ==
- Cuba's Official Entry to the Academy Awards, Best Foreign Film, 2016.
- Cuba's Official Entry to the Goya Awards, Best Foreign Film, 2016.
- Busan International Film Festival, Official Selection World Cinema, 2015.
- Chicago International Film Festival, Official Selection World Cinema, 2015.
- Cinélatino: Recontres de Toulouse, Audience Award, 2016.
- Havana Film Festival New York, Best Screenplay 2016.
- Málaga International Film Festival, Audience Award, 2016.
- Miami International Film Festival, Audience Award, 2016.

== See also ==
- List of submissions to the 89th Academy Awards for Best Foreign Language Film
- List of Cuban submissions for the Academy Award for Best Foreign Language Film
