= A Fantastic Woman =

2017 film by Sebastián Lelio

- Chilean theatrical release poster
- Spanish: Una mujer fantástica
- Directed by: Sebastián Lelio
- Written by: Sebastián Lelio; Gonzalo Maza
- Produced by: Juan de Dios Larraín; Pablo Larraín
- Starring: Daniela Vega; Francisco Reyes
- Cinematography: Benjamín Echazarreta
- Edited by: Soledad Salfate
- Music by: Matthew Herbert
- Production companies: Fábula; Komplizen Film
- Distributed by: Participant Media (Chile); Piffl Medien (Germany); BTeam Pictures (Spain); Sony Pictures Classics (United States)
- Release dates: 12 February 2017 (Berlinale); 6 April 2017 (Chile); 7 September 2017 (Germany); 20 October 2017 (Spain); 2 February 2018 (United States)
- Running time: 104 minutes
- Countries: Chile; Germany; Spain; United States
- Language: Spanish
- Box office: $3.7 million

A Fantastic Woman (Spanish: Una mujer fantástica) is a 2017 drama film directed by Sebastián Lelio, co-written with Gonzalo Maza. A co-production of Chile, Germany, Spain, and the United States, it stars Daniela Vega as Marina, a young trans woman living in Santiago alongside her partner Orlando (Francisco Reyes).

The film had its world premiere in the main competition of the 67th Berlin International Film Festival on 12 February 2017, where it won the Silver Bear for Best Screenplay and the Teddy Award. It was theatrically released in Chile by Participant Media on 6 April 2017, and received critical acclaim.

At the 90th Academy Awards, it won the Academy Award for Best Foreign Language Film representing Chile, marking the country's first win.

== Plot ==
Marina is a young trans woman living in Santiago, Chile. She works as a singer and a waitress and is in a relationship with an older man named Orlando. They have recently moved in together, and on Marina's birthday, Orlando gives her a note promising tickets to a famous resort as a gift. However, Orlando wakes up in the middle of the night feeling unwell and stumbles down a flight of stairs. Marina takes him to the hospital, but he dies of a brain aneurysm.

Marina contacts Orlando's brother, Gabo, and is later picked up by the police. The officers call her 'sir' after checking her old ID card and demand an explanation for her sudden departure from the hospital. Gabo arrives and speaks to Marina with enough familiarity to convince the police of her innocence. He lets her take Orlando's car home.

Orlando's ex-wife, Sonia, contacts Marina to arrange a time for her to drop off Orlando's car. While working, Marina is visited by a detective named Adriana, who works on cases that include sexual assault. Adriana suggests that Orlando was paying Marina as a sex worker rather than the two dating. She also thinks Marina may have caused Orlando's bruises while defending herself from a violent encounter. The detective tells Marina she will be waiting to meet with her after work-- she does not go.

Marina returns home, where she is comforted by Orlando's dog, Diabla. Orlando's son, Bruno, arrives the next morning and harasses Marina with personal questions. Marina takes the car to be washed and "sees" Orlando, which disturbs her. She then meets Sonia in a car park and hands over the car. Sonia becomes upset and asks Marina to hand over the flat as soon as possible. She tells Marina not to go to the funeral.

She goes to meet detective Adriana who insists a physical exam must be performed because Marina did not meet with her after work the day prior. When Marina tries to refuse the exam, the detective warns that doing so will result in an investigation being opened against her. She is forced to be photographed nude to check for any signs of bruising or injury.

Gabo calls Marina and tells her that Orlando will be cremated, and he wants her to have some of the ashes. Marina prepares to move out of Orlando's apartment and discovers Bruno has taken Diabla.

Wanda, her sister, and Gastón, Wanda's partner, warn her to let it go, but she decides to attend the wake. Upon her arrival, Sonia demands that Marina leave, and Gabo follows her out and apologizes. Later, Bruno and his friends accost and kidnap Marina, threatening her and wrapping her face in scotch tape before leaving her in an alleyway. Marina then walks to a gay club where she meets a man and later hallucinates seeing Orlando. Later she spends the night with Wanda and Gastón.

She decides to visit a sauna where Orlando had left a numbered key. She nervously enters the sauna and books in before locating the lockers and opening Orlando's, only to find it empty. The next day, Marina discovers the details of Orlando's funeral in the newspaper.

After the funeral ceremony, Marina is confronted by Orlando's family who insult her, prompting her to climb on top of their car and demand her dog back. She follows an employee into the morgue and sees Orlando's body before his cremation.

In the final scene, Marina is seen running with Diabla and later singing an opera recital to a packed audience.

== Cast ==
- Daniela Vega as Marina Vidal
  - A trans woman who is grieving the loss of her older significant other. Daniela Vega first engaged with the script as a cultural consultant to create an emotional connection between the viewer and the life of a trans woman. Lelio later proposed Vega play the role of Marina. Vega established three key characteristics in Marina’s role: "one is dignity, one is rebelliousness, and the last one is resilience". Vega remarks on the importance of Marina’s character in interviews, asserting that Marina transcends the societal limits of love and encourages empathy for trans individuals.
- Francisco Reyes as Orlando Onetto Partier
- Luis Gnecco as Gabriel Onetto Partier
- Aline Küppenheim as Sonia Bunster
- Amparo Noguera as Adriana Cortés
- Nicolás Saavedra as Bruno Onetto Bunster
- Antonia Zegers as Alessandra
- Trinidad González as Wanda Vidal
- Néstor Cantillana as Gastón
- Alejandro Goic as Doctor
- Sergio Hernández as piano teacher
- Roberto Farías as medic in SML
- Marcial Tagle as Orlando's relative
- Pablo Cerda as Pablo
- Erto Pantoja as police man
- Paola Lattus as nurse

== Release ==
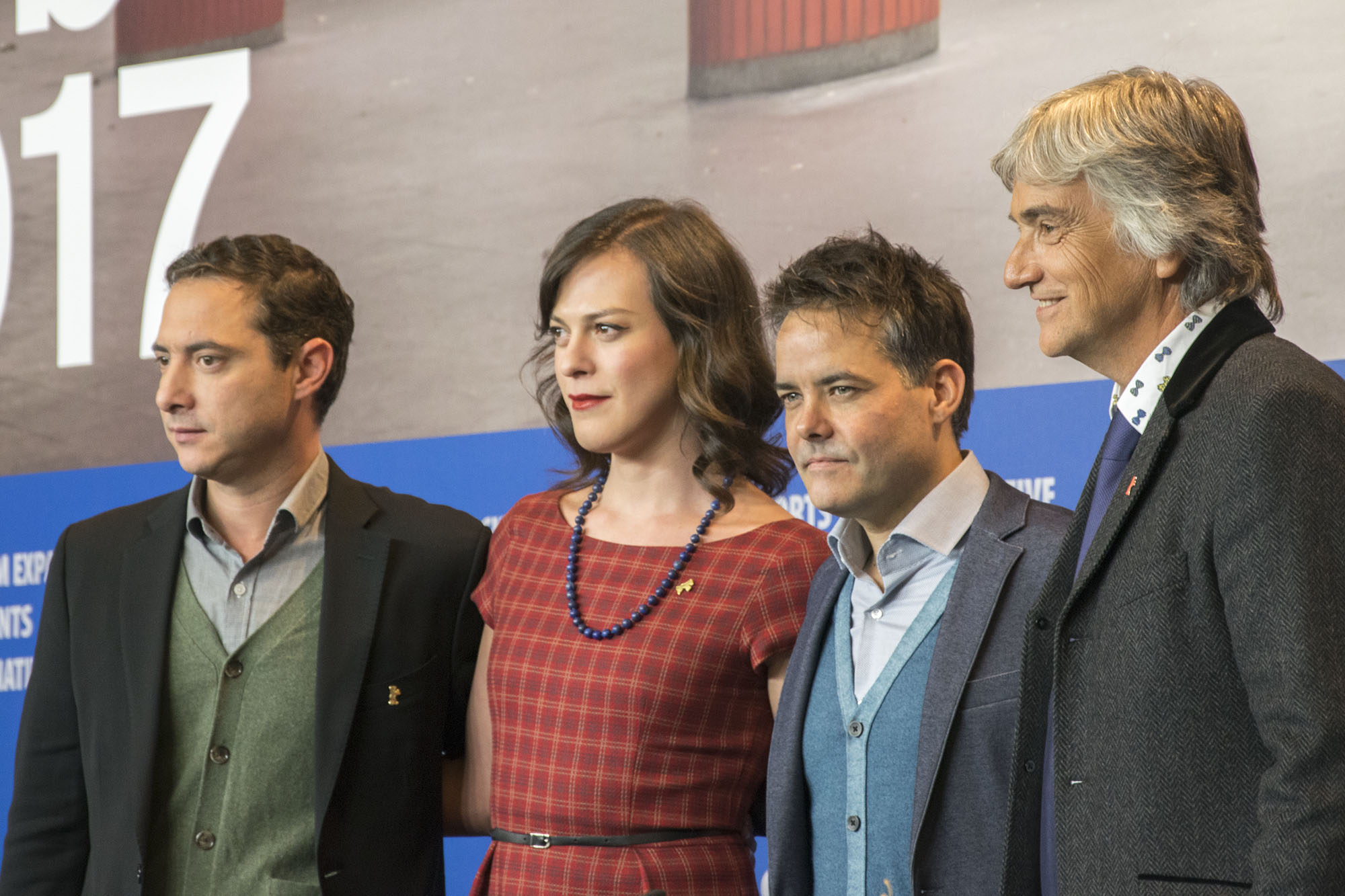
Larraín, Vega, Lelio, Reyes at the 2017 Berlin Film Festival

A Fantastic Woman premiered at the 67th Berlin International Film Festival on 12 February 2017. The movie won the Silver Bear for Best Screenplay and the Teddy Award, which is given to films with an LGBT theme. Two days prior to the premiere, Sony Pictures Classics acquired the distribution rights for the film in North America, Australia and New Zealand.

== Reception ==
The film holds a 94% approval rating on review aggregation website Rotten Tomatoes, based on 221 reviews, with an average rating of 8.10/10. The website's critical consensus reads, "Subtle and tender, A Fantastic Woman handles its timely, sensitive subject matter with care." It holds a score of 86 out of 100 on Metacritic based on 43 reviews, indicating "universal acclaim".

Chilean LGBTQ activists used A Fantastic Woman's Oscar win to accelerate local discussions on a gender identity bill. Subsequently, Chile approved laws allowing transgender citizens to change their official details in late 2018. According to political scientists Carsten-Andreas Schulz and Cameron G. Thies, the international recognition of the film temporarily made support for trans rights a matter of national pride in Chile, which opened a window of opportunity for the approval of the law.

== Accolades ==
A Fantastic Woman received a nomination for Best Foreign Language Film at the 90th Academy Awards, and became the first Chilean film to win the award in this category. It was the second Chilean film to win an Oscar, after Bear Story in 2016.

Award	Date of ceremony	Category	Recipients	Result	Ref.
Academy Awards	4 March 2018	Best Foreign Language Film	Chile	Won	
Ariel Awards	5 June 2018	Best Ibero-American Film	A Fantastic Woman	Won	
Belgian Film Critics Association	7 January 2018	Grand Prix	A Fantastic Woman	Nominated	
Berlin International Film Festival	18 February 2017	Teddy Award – Best Feature Film	Sebastián Lelio	Won	
Berlin International Film Festival	18 February 2017	Silver Bear for Best Screenplay	Sebastián Lelio and Gonzalo Maza	Won	
Berlin International Film Festival	18 February 2017	Golden Bear	Sebastián Lelio	Nominated	
Cabourg Film Festival	18 June 2017	Grand Jury Prize	Sebastián Lelio	Won	
Critics' Choice Movie Awards	11 January 2018	Best Foreign Language Film	A Fantastic Woman	Nominated	
Dorian Awards	31 January 2018	Best Foreign Language Film	A Fantastic Woman	Nominated	
Dorian Awards	31 January 2018	Best Actress	Daniela Vega	Nominated	
Dorian Awards	31 January 2018	Best LGBTQ Film	A Fantastic Woman	Nominated	
Dorian Awards	31 January 2018	Best Rising Star	Daniela Vega	Nominated	
GLAAD Media Awards	12 April 2018	Outstanding Film – Limited Release	A Fantastic Woman	Won	
Golden Globe Award	7 January 2018	Best Foreign Language Film	A Fantastic Woman	Nominated	
Goya Awards	3 February 2018	Best Iberoamerican Film	A Fantastic Woman	Won	
Havana Film Festival	15 December 2017	Special Jury Prize	A Fantastic Woman	Won	
Havana Film Festival	15 December 2017	Best Actress	Daniela Vega	Won	
Havana Film Festival	15 December 2017	Unete- United Nations Prize	A Fantastic Woman	Won	
Independent Spirit Awards	3 March 2018	Best International Film	A Fantastic Woman	Won	
National Board of Review	28 November 2017	Top Five Foreign Language Films	A Fantastic Woman	Won	
Palm Springs International Film Festival	13 January 2018	Honorable Mention Cine Latino Jury	A Fantastic Woman	Won	
Palm Springs International Film Festival	13 January 2018	Best Actress in a Foreign Language Film	Daniela Vega	Won	
Platino Awards	29 April 2018	Best Film	A Fantastic Woman	Won	
Platino Awards	29 April 2018	Best Director	Sebastián Lelio	Won	
Platino Awards	29 April 2018	Best Actress	Daniela Vega	Won	
Platino Awards	29 April 2018	Best Screenplay	Sebastián Lelio and Gonzalo Maza	Won	
Platino Awards	29 April 2018	Best Film Editing	Soledad Salfate	Won	
Platino Awards	29 April 2018	Best Cinematography	Benjamín Echazarreta	Nominated	
Platino Awards	29 April 2018	Best Art Direction	Estefanía Larraín	Nominated	
Platino Awards	29 April 2018	Best Sound	Tina Laschke	Nominated	
Platino Awards	29 April 2018	Film and Education Values	A Fantastic Woman	Nominated	

== See also ==
- List of submissions to the 90th Academy Awards for Best Foreign Language Film
- List of Chilean submissions for the Academy Award for Best Foreign Language Film
