= Last Days in Havana =

2016 film

- Film poster
- Directed by: Fernando Pérez
- Written by: Fernando Pérez; Abel Rodríguez
- Starring: Jorge Martínez
- Cinematography: Raúl Pérez Ureta
- Release date: 17 March 2016
- Country: Cuba
- Language: Spanish

Last Days in Havana (Spanish: Últimos días en La Habana) is a 2016 Cuban drama film directed and co-written by Fernando Pérez. It was screened in the Berlinale Special section at the 67th Berlin International Film Festival. In 2017 it won the Havana Star Prize for Best Film (Fiction) at the 18th Havana Film Festival New York.

== Cast ==
- Jorge Martinez
- Gabriela Ramos
- Patricio Wood
- Yailene Sierra
