= The Summit (2017 film) =

2017 film

- Theatrical release poster
- Directed by: Santiago Mitre
- Written by: Mariano Llinás; Santiago Mitre
- Produced by: Hugo Sigman; Fernando Bovaira; Matías Mosteirín; Didar Domehri; Simón de Santiago; Fernando Brom; Agustina Llamba-Campbell; Leticia Cristi; Axel Kuschevatzky
- Starring: Ricardo Darín; Dolores Fonzi; Érica Rivas
- Cinematography: Javier Julia
- Edited by: Nicolás Goldbart
- Music by: Alberto Iglesias
- Production companies: Kramer & Sigman Films; La Unión de los Ríos; Mod Producciones; Maneki Films; Arte France Cinéma; Movistar+; Televisión Federal
- Distributed by: Warner Bros. Pictures
- Release dates: 24 May 2017 (Cannes); 17 August 2017 (Argentina)
- Running time: 114 minutes
- Countries: Argentina; France; Spain
- Languages: Spanish; Portuguese; English
- Budget: $6 million
- Box office: $5.3 million

The Summit (Spanish: La cordillera) is a 2017 political drama film directed by Santiago Mitre and written by Mitre and Mariano Llinás. Set during a Latin American summit, a newly-elected president of Argentina has to navigate his way through strategic issues affecting the future of his country and personal issues affecting his family and reputation.

The film stars Ricardo Darín, Dolores Fonzi, Érica Rivas, Elena Anaya, Daniel Giménez Cacho, Alfredo Castro, Gerardo Romano, Leonardo Franco, Paulina García, and Christian Slater. It was screened in the Un Certain Regard section at the 2017 Cannes Film Festival. It was released on 17 August 2017 in Argentina.

== Plot ==
As a summit of Latin-American nations opens at a ski resort in Chile, all eyes are on Hernán Blanco, the new president of Argentina. A quiet man from the provinces, it is unknown what impact he will make on the international scene and what he will secure for Argentina in the jockeying for power and profits over energy resources. Learning that his daughter's estranged husband is in difficulties which could endanger his reputation, he orders her to be brought to the isolated hotel.

The heads of state argue over two main plans for future energy needs. Mexico wants an alliance of North, Central, and South America that is open to private enterprise, which means access for US energy firms. Brazil wants a South American cartel under state control. Blanco initially thinks that Argentina cannot afford to fall out with its larger neighbour and scorns the Mexican plan. Summoned to a secret meeting with a US official, he is offered three billion dollars via a Barbados intermediary if he will back the Mexican plan.

His life is complicated when his daughter attempts suicide, relapses into mutism, and then under hypnotherapy recounts apparently false memories casting him in a bad light. News then comes that her husband, a drug user, has had a stroke which may prove fatal. This removes the threat hanging over Blanco, whose vote secures approval for the Mexican plan and whose government will have the use of the US largesse.

== Cast ==
- Ricardo Darín as Hernán Blanco, President of Argentina
- Dolores Fonzi as Marina Blanco
- Érica Rivas as Luisa Cordero
- Elena Anaya as Claudia Klein
- Daniel Giménez Cacho as Sebastián Sastre, President of Mexico
- Alfredo Castro as Desiderio García
- Gerardo Romano as Mariano Castex
- Leonardo Franco as Oliveira Prete, President of Brazil
- Paulina García as Paula Sherson, President of Chile
- Christian Slater as Dereck McKinley, Secretary of State of the United States
- Rafael Alfaro as Preysler, President of Paraguay

== Reception ==
On Rotten Tomatoes, the film has an aggregate score of 58% based on 11 positive and 8 negative critic reviews.

A review published in Variety states the following: "As an arthouse film, The Summit has too many genre trappings; as a genre film, especially one in the thriller category, which relies on a solid dismount, it doesn’t satisfy." Similarly, The Hollywood Reporter concludes that the movie has "underdeveloped characters" and a third-act which "never feels connected to what has come before".
