= Sebastián Lelio =

Chilean film director and screenwriter (1974–2026)

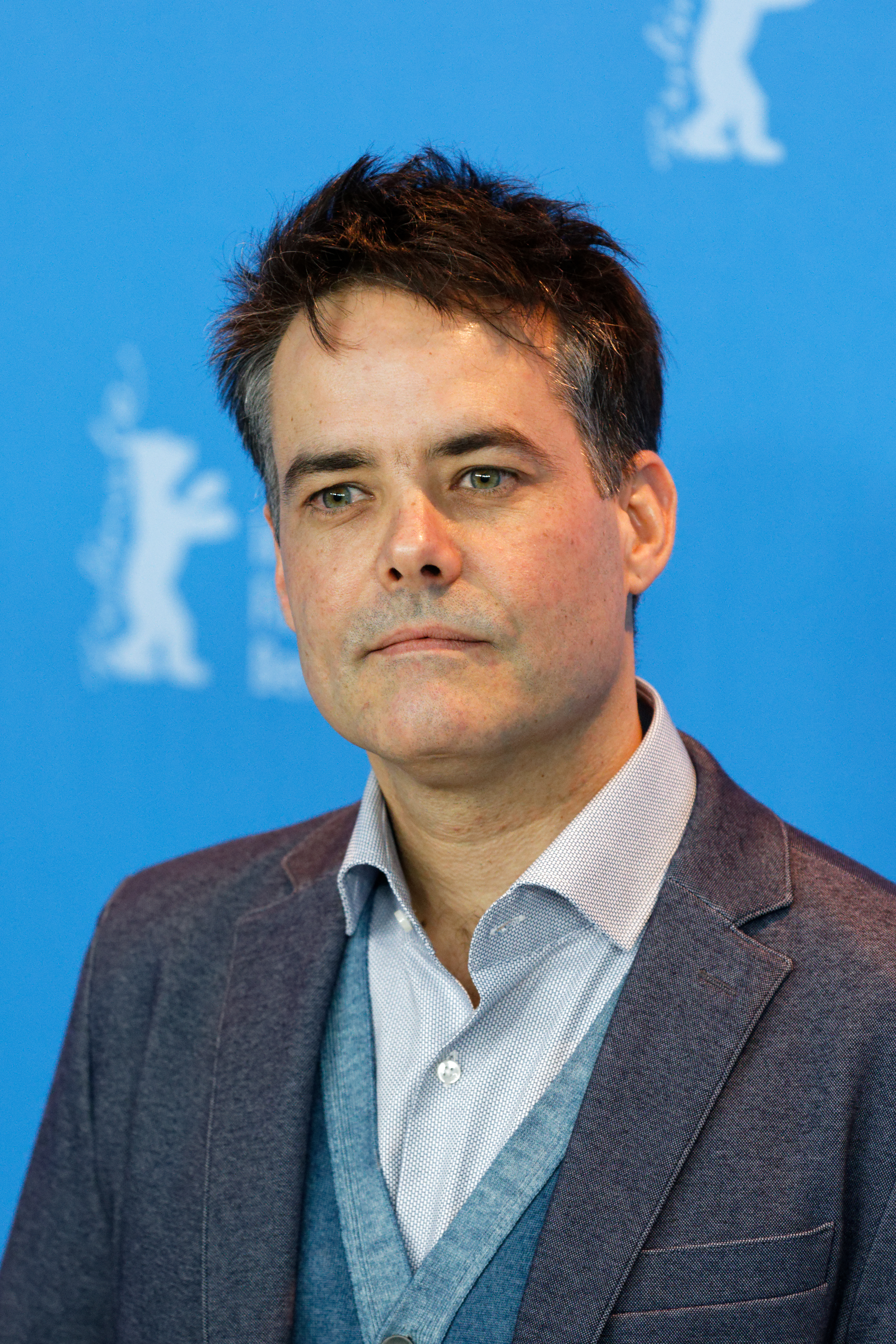
- Lelio in 2017
- Born: Sebastián Lelio Watt; 8 March 1974; Mendoza, Argentina
- Died: 6 November 2026 (aged 52); Las Condes, Chile
- Occupations: Filmmaker; editor; producer
- Years active: 1995–2026

Sebastián Lelio Watt (8 March 1974 – 6 November 2026) was a Chilean filmmaker, editor and producer. He received critical acclaim for directing the films Gloria (2013) and A Fantastic Woman (2017), the latter of which won an Academy Award for Best Foreign Language Film.

== Early life ==
Lelio was born in Mendoza, Argentina, and moved to Viña del Mar, Chile, at the age of two with his Chilean mother, Valeria. He described his early life as "nomadic": "Up to the age of 21, I was moving between different cities in Chile. I lived for a time in the United States, and also in Viña del Mar; my maternal family is from Viña...essentially I was never more than two or three years in the same city."

Born with the surname Lelio, he changed his surname to that of his adoptive father Campos, but after having attained some fame with his first film, Lelio again took his biological father's name.

== Career ==
After studying journalism for one year at Andrés Bello University, Lelio graduated from the Chilean Film School (Escuela de Cine de Chile). He directed many short films and musical videos. In 2003, he released Cero, a documentary based on unedited material from the 2001 September 11 attacks in New York, co-directing with Carlos Fuentes. He directed two seasons of the successful documentary series Mi mundo privado (My private life) together with Fernando Lavanderos. The series followed the private lives of Chilean families from diverse socioeconomic backgrounds and was nominated twice for the Altazor Awards and also the Emmy Awards.

In 2005, his debut feature film La Sagrada Familia (The Sacred Family) premiered at the San Sebastián International Film Festival. Filmed over three days and edited over a period of almost one year, the film screened in over one hundred festivals and received a number of national and international awards. In 2009, his second feature film, Navidad (Christmas), premiered at the Cannes Film Festival.

The Year of the Tiger (Spanish: El Año del Tigre), Lelio's third feature film, premiered at the Locarno International Film Festival in 2011. The film is set in the aftermath of the 2010 Chile earthquake and follows an escaped prisoner as he journeys through areas hit hardest by the quake.

As with his first two films, The Year of the Tiger explores religious faith and how it influences people's behaviours. Lelio told an interviewer from The Clinic (magazine), "What I find fascinating is the interplay between the question of meaning that religion poses - a basic question - with the fact that in Chile, in Latin America, the Judeo-Christian version of reality is dominant. Everything is defined in relation to this view: whether you are for or against it, whether or not you escape it."

Lelio's fourth feature film, Gloria, won the San Sebastián International Film Festival Film in Progress award in 2012. The film premiered at the Berlin International Film Festival in 2013, to excellent reviews, with lead actress Paulina García receiving the festival's prestigious Best Actress award.

For, his fictional work, Lelio favoured the use of digital cinematography. He created the short films Ciudad de maravillas and Carga vital.

Lelio was awarded a Guggenheim Fellowship and a German DAAD grant to develop new projects. As a scriptwriter, Lelio wrote or co-wrote all of his films (including short films), such as Navidad (Christmas) and The Year of the Tiger.

A Fantastic Woman (2017) premiered at the 67th Berlin International Film Festival, where Lelio won the Silver Bear for Best Screenplay and the Teddy Award. It also won the Academy Award for Best Foreign Language Film at the 90th Academy Awards, marking the first Chilean film to win that honor.

Disobedience (2017), marked his first English-language feature film, starring Rachel Weisz and Rachel McAdams. It premiered at the 2017 Toronto International Film Festival. He followed with Gloria Bell (2018), an English-language remake of his own 2013's Gloria, and starring Julianne Moore.

The Chilean Lelio's Oscar success was reported by the Argentinian press as the "Argentinian Director who won the Oscar". In an interview with Clarín in February 2018, he stated: "I was born in Argentina but technically I am not Argentinian, I am Chilean. My biological father is Argentinian but I was raised in Chile. I have a relationship with him and Argentina, place where I go often but in strict sense I am not Argentinian."

In 2024, Lelio and other filmmakers signed a letter against Javier Milei's plans to cut funding of the INCAA.

In late 2026, Lelio had begun production for Poeta Chileno, based on the novel of the same name by Alejandro Zambra.

== Death ==
Lelio died at his home in Las Condes, Chile, on 6 November 2026, at the age of 52. His girlfriend Amalia Kassai said he died due to "health reasons".

=== Tributes and legacy ===
Peter Bradshaw of The Guardian stated that Lelio was "great humanist and a great cinematic poet of ordinary lives". Chile's government declared two days of national mourning following Lelio's death.

== Filmography ==
=== Feature films ===
Year	English Title	Original title	Notes
2005	The Sacred Family	La sagrada familia	Also editor
2009	Christmas	Navidad	Also editor
2011	The Year of the Tiger	El año del tigre	Also editor
2013	Gloria		Also producer and editor
2017	A Fantastic Woman	Una mujer fantástica	
2017	Disobedience		
2018	Gloria Bell		Also producer English remake of his own 2013 film Gloria
2022	The Wonder		
2025	The Wave	La Ola	Also producer
TBA		Poeta Chileno	In production

=== Short films ===
- 4, 1995
- Cuatro, 1996
- Smog, with Marialy Rivas, 2000
- Fragmentos urbanos, 2002
- Ciudad de maravillas, 2002
- Carga vital, 2003
- El efecto Kulechov, 2010
- Algoritmo, 2020
