= 73rd CEC Awards =

Spanish film awards

- Date: 29 January 2018
- Site: Palacio de la Prensa, Madrid, Spain
- Hosted by: Alfonso Sánchez; Alberto López
- Organized by: Círculo de Escritores Cinematográficos

Highlights
- Most awards: The Bookshop (4)
- Most nominations: The Motive and The Bookshop (8)

The 73rd CEC Medals ceremony, presented by the Círculo de Escritores Cinematográficos, took place on 29 January 2018 at the Palacio de la Prensa in Madrid. The gala was hosted by Alfonso Sánchez and Alberto López (Los Compadres).

== Winners and nominees ==
The winners and nominees are listed as follows:

Best Film: The Bookshop; The Motive; Summer 1993; Handia	Best Animation Film: Tad the Lost Explorer and the Secret of King Midas; Deep; Nur eta herensugearen tenplua
Best Director: Isabel Coixet – The Bookshop; Manuel Martín Cuenca – The Motive; Álex de la Iglesia – Perfect Strangers & The Bar; Aitor Arregi, Jon Garaño – Handia	Best New Director: Carla Simón – Summer 1993; Javier Ambrossi, Javier Calvo – Holy Camp!; Lino Escalera – Can't Say Goodbye; Adolfo Martínez – Rescue Under Fire
Best Original Screenplay: Carla Simón – Summer 1993; Jon Garaño, Aitor Arregi, Jose Mari Goenaga, Andoni de Carlos – Handia; Pablo Berger, Isabel Peña – Abracadabra; Fernando Navarro, Paco Plaza – Verónica	Best Adapted Screenplay: Isabel Coixet – The Bookshop; Manuel Martín Cuenca, Alejandro Hernández – The Motive; Javier Ambrossi, Javier Calvo – Holy Camp!; Agustí Villaronga, Coral Cruz – Uncertain Glory; Jorge Guerricaechevarría, Álex de la Iglesia – Perfect Strangers
Best Actor: Javier Gutiérrez – The Motive; Eduard Fernández – Perfect Strangers; Antonio de la Torre – Abracadabra; Andrés Gertrúdix – Dying	Best Actress: Nathalie Poza – Can't Say Goodbye; Maribel Verdú – Abracadabra; Marian Álvarez – Dying; Emily Mortimer – The Bookshop
Best Supporting Actor: Bill Nighy – The Bookshop; David Verdaguer – Summer 1993; Antonio de la Torre – The Motive; José Mota – Abracadabra	Best Supporting Actress: Lola Dueñas – Can't Say Goodbye; Anna Castillo – Holy Camp!; Belén Cuesta – Holy Camp!; Adelfa Calvo – The Motive
Best New Actor: Eneko Sagardoy – Handia; Santiago Alverú – Selfie; Pol Monen – Amar: With You Until the End of the World; Miguel Martín – The Sepherd	Best New Actress: Sandra Escacena – Verónica; Bruna Cusí – Summer 1993; Adriana Paz – The Motive; Laia Artigas – Summer 1993
Best Cinematography: Jean-Claude Larrieu – The Bookshop; Pau Esteve Birba – The Motive; Migue Amoedo – Holy Camp!; Josep M. Civit – Uncertain Glory	Best Editing: Martí Roca – Verónica; Bernat Aragonés – The Bookshop; Laurent Dufreche, Raúl López – Handia; Ana Pfaff, Didac Palou – Summer 1993
Best Music: Pascal Gaigne – Handia; Alfonso de Vilallonga – The Bookshop; Eugenio Mira – Verónica; Roque Baños – Rescue Under Fire	Best Documentary Film: Lots of Kids, a Monkey and a Castle; Saura(s); Cantábrico; Converso
Best Foreign Film: La La Land; Dunkirk; Coco; Lumière ! L'aventure commence; Lady Macbeth

== Special awards ==
- Honorary Medal: Assumpta Serna
- Medal for the Literary Merit: A Notorius Ediciones
- Medal for the Promotion of Cinema: Primitivo Rodríguez
- Medal for the Journalistic Merit: De película (RNE)
- 'Solidaridad' Medal: Los demás días
