= List of Spanish films of 2017 =

A list of Spanish-produced and co-produced feature films released in Spain in 2017. When applicable, the domestic theatrical release date is favoured.

== Films ==
| Release | | Title (Domestic title) | Cast & Crew | Distribution label | Ref. |
|---|---|---|---|---|---|
| J A N U A R Y | 6 | The Invisible Guest (Contratiempo) | Director: Oriol Paulo Cast: Mario Casas, Bárbara Lennie, Ana Wagener, José Coronado | Warner Bros. Pictures | |
| J A N U A R Y | 13 | Realive (Proyecto Lázaro) | Director: Mateo Gil Cast: Tom Hughes, Charlotte Le Bon, Oona Chaplin, Barry Ward | Filmax | |
| J A N U A R Y | 20 | The Tunnel Gang (Los del túnel) | Director: Pepón Montero Cast: Arturo Valls, Natalia de Molina, Raúl Cimas, Neus Asensi, Manolo Solo, Enrique Martínez | eOne Films | |
| F E B R U A R Y | 17 | The Healer (Lo que de verdad importa) | Director: Paco Arango Cast: Oliver Jackson-Cohen, Jonathan Pryce, Camilla Luddington | European Dreams Factory | |
| F E B R U A R Y | 24 | It's for Your Own Good (Es por tu bien) | Director: Carlos Therón Cast: José Coronado, Javier Cámara, Roberto Álamo | Buena Vista International | |
| M A R C H | 3 | The Invisible Guardian (El guardián invisible) | Director: Fernando González Molina Cast: Marta Etura, Elvira Mínguez, Carlos Librado | DeAPlaneta | |
| M A R C H | 10 | Rescue Under Fire (Zona hostil) | Director: Adolfo Martínez Cast: Ariadna Gil, Raúl Mérida, Roberto Álamo, Antonio Garrido, Ingrid García Jonsson, Jacobo Dicenta, Ismael Martínez, Nasser Saleh, Mariam Hernández, Ruth Gabriel | eOne Films | |
| M A R C H | 17 | Uncertain Glory (Incerta glòria) | Director: Agustí Villaronga Cast: Marcel Borràs, Núria Prims, Oriol Pla, Bruna Cusí, Luisa Gavasa, Juan Diego, Fernando Esteso, Terele Pávez | Alfa Pictures | |
| M A R C H | 24 | The Bar (El bar) | Director: Álex de la Iglesia Cast: Mario Casas, Blanca Suárez, Carmen Machi, Secun de la Rosa, Terele Pávez, Jaime Ordóñez | Sony Pictures | |
| A P R I L | 7 | Orbiter 9 (Órbita 9) | Director: Hatem Khraiche Cast: Clara Lago, Álex González | Filmax | |
| A P R I L | 12 | Black Snow (Nieve negra) | Director: Martín Hodara Cast: Ricardo Darín, Leonardo Sbaraglia, Laia Costa, Federico Luppi | A Contracorriente Films | (Note: Co-production Spain–Argentina (70%–30%).) |
| A P R I L | 21 | Amar: With You Until the End of the World (Amar) | Director: Esteban Crespo Cast: María Pedraza, Pol Monen, Natalia Tena | Avalon | |
| A P R I L | 28 | Getaway Plan (Plan de fuga) | Director: Iñaki Dorronsoro Cast: Luis Tosar, Javier Gutiérrez, Alain Hernández, Alba Galocha | Warner Bros. Pictures | |
| M A Y | 5 | The Chess Player (El jugador de ajedrez) | Director: Luis Oliveros Cast: Marc Clotet, Melina Matthews, Alejo Sauras | Syldavia Cinema | |
| M A Y | 5 | Casi leyendas | Director: Gabriel Nesci Cast: Santiago Segura, Diego Peretti, Diego Torres | A Contracorriente Films | |
| M A Y | 12 | Sister of Mine (Demonios tus ojos) | Director: Pedro Aguilera Cast: Ivana Baquero, Julio Perillán, Lucía Guerrero, Nicolás Coronado, Elisabet Gelabert, Juan Pablo Shuk | Good Films | |
| M A Y | 19 | Can't Say Goodbye (No sé decir adiós) | Director: Lino Escalera Cast: Nathalie Poza, Juan Diego, Lola Dueñas | Súper 8 | |
| J U N E | 9 | Skins (Pieles) | Director: Eduardo Casanova Cast: Jon Kortajarena, Candela Peña, Ana Polvorosa, Macarena Gómez, Secun de la Rosa, Carmen Machi, Joaquín Climent, Itziar Castro | Premium Cinema | |
| J U N E | 16 | Lord, Give Me Patience (Señor, dame paciencia) | Director: Álvaro Díaz Lorenzo Cast: Jordi Sánchez, Megan Montaner, Silvia Alonso, Eduardo Casanova, Rossy de Palma | Warner Bros. Pictures | |
| J U N E | 16 | Pet (Animal de compañía) | Director: Carles Torrens Cast: Dominic Monaghan, Ksenia Solo, Jennette McCurdy | La Aventura | (Note: Co-production Spain–United States (50%–50%).) |
| J U N E | 16 | Júlia Ist | Director: Elena Martín Cast: Elena Martín, Carla Linares, Jakob D'Aprile | Avalon | |
| J U N E | 30 | Summer 1993 (Estiu 1993) | Director: Carla Simón Cast: Laia Artigas, Bruna Cusí, David Verdaguer | Avalon | |
| J U N E | 30 | Colossal | Director: Nacho Vigalondo Cast: Anne Hathaway, Jason Sudeikis, Dan Stevens, Austin Stowell, Tim Blake Nelson | Versus Entertainment | |
| J U N E | 30 | Despido procedente | Director: Lucas Figueroa Cast: Imanol Arias, Darío Grandinetti, Hugo Silva | Súper 8 | |
| J U L Y | 7 | Brava | Director: Roser Aguilar Cast: Laia Marull, Bruno Todeschini | World Line Cinema | |
| J U L Y | 28 | Inside | Director: Miguel Ángel Vivas Cast: Rachel Nichols, Laura Harring | eOne Films | |
| A U G U S T | 4 | Abracadabra (Abracadabra) | Director:Pablo Berger Cast: Maribel Verdú, Antonio de la Torre, José Mota | Sony Pictures | |
| A U G U S T | 25 | Tad the Lost Explorer and the Secret of King Midas (Tadeo Jones 2: El secreto del rey Midas) | Director: Enrique Gato | Paramount Pictures | |
| A U G U S T | 25 | Veronica (Verónica) | Director: Paco Plaza Cast: Sandra Escacena, Bruna González, Ana Torrent | Sony Pictures | |
| S E P T E M B E R | 1 | The Mist and the Maiden (La niebla y la doncella) | Director: Andrés M. Koppel Cast: Aura Garrido, Quim Gutiérrez, Verónica Echegui, Roberto Álamo | DeAPlaneta | |
| S E P T E M B E R | 29 | Holy Camp! (La llamada) | Directors: Javier Ambrossi, Javier Calvo Cast: Macarena García, Anna Castillo, Belén Cuesta, Gracia Olayo, Richard Collins-Moore | DeAPlaneta | |
| S E P T E M B E R | 29 | The Summit (La cordillera) | Director: Santiago Mitre Cast: Ricardo Darín, Dolores Fonzi, Érica Rivas, Elena Anaya | Warner Bros. Pictures | |
| O C T O B E R | 6 | Toc Toc | Director: Vicente Villanueva Cast: Paco León, Rossy de Palma, Alexandra Jiménez, Oscar Martínez, Nuria Herrero, Inma Cuevas | Warner Bros. Pictures | |
| O C T O B E R | 6 | Dying (Morir) | Director: Fernando Franco Cast: Marian Álvarez, Andrés Gertrúdix | Golem | |
| O C T O B E R | 6 | The Last Suit (El último traje) | Director: Pablo Solarz Cast: Miguel Ángel Solá, Ángela Molina, Martín Piroyansky, Natalia Verbeke, Olga Bołądź | Syldavia Cinema | |
| O C T O B E R | 11 | A Fantastic Woman (Una mujer fantástica) | Director: Sebastián Lelio Cast: Daniela Vega, Luis Gnecco, Francisco Reyes | BTeam Pictures | |
| O C T O B E R | 12 | You Only Live Once (Solo se vive una vez) | Director: Federico Cueva Cast: Peter Lanzani, Santiago Segura, Gerard Depardieu, Hugo Silva, Carlos Areces, Arancha Martí | A Contracorriente Films | |
| O C T O B E R | 20 | Giant (Handia) | Director: Aitor Arregui, Jon Garaño Cast: Eneko Sagardoy, Joseba Usabiaga, Íñigo Aranburu, Ramon Agirre, Aia Kruse, Itziar Aizpuru | A Contracorriente Films | |
| O C T O B E R | 20 | Cold Skin (La piel fría) | Director: Xavier Gens Cast: Ray Stevenson, David Oakes, Aura Garrido | Diamond Films | |
| O C T O B E R | 27 | Marrowbone (El secreto de Marrowbone) | Director: Sergio G. Sánchez Cast: Anya Taylor-Joy, George MacKay, Mia Goth, Charlie Heaton, Matthew Stagg, Kyle Soller | Universal Pictures | |
| N O V E M B E R | 3 | Deep | Director: Julio Soto | Tripictures | |
| N O V E M B E R | 3 | The Solar System (El sistema solar) | Director: Chinón Higashionna, Bacha Caravedo Cast: Adriana Ugarte, Javier Valdés, Gisela Ponce de León, César Ritter | Filmax | |
| N O V E M B E R | 10 | Gold (Oro) | Director: Agustín Díaz Yanes Cast: Raúl Arévalo, Bárbara Lennie, Óscar Jaenada, Anna Castillo, Jose Coronado, José Manuel Cervino, Juan José Ballesta | Sony Pictures | |
| N O V E M B E R | 10 | Muse (Musa) | Director: Jaume Balagueró Cast: Elliot Cowan, Franka Potente, Ana Ularu, Manuela Vellés, Leonor Watling | Filmax | |
| N O V E M B E R | 10 | The Bookshop (La librería) | Director: Isabel Coixet Cast: Emily Mortimer, Patricia Clarkson, Bill Nighy, James Lance, Michael Fitzgerald, Jorge Suquet | A Contracorriente Films | (Note: Co-production Spain–United Kingdom (66.53%–33.47%).) |
| N O V E M B E R | 17 | The Motive (El autor) | Director: Manuel Martín Cuenca Cast: Javier Gutiérrez, María León, Antonio de la Torre, Adriana Paz, Tenoch Huerta, Adelfa Calvo, Rafael Téllez | Filmax | (Note: Co-production Spain–Mexico (90%–10%).) |
| N O V E M B E R | 24 | Anchor and Hope (Tierra firme) | Director: Carlos Marques-Marcet Cast: Oona Chaplin, Natalia Tena, David Verdaguer | Avalon | |
| N O V E M B E R | 24 | The Bastards' Fig Tree (La higuera de los bastardos) | Director: Ana Murugarren Cast: Karra Elejalde, Carlos Areces, Jordi Sánchez, Pepa Aniorte | Festival Films | |
| D E C E M B E R | 1 | Perfect Strangers (Perfectos desconocidos) | Director: Álex de la Iglesia Cast: Ernesto Alterio, Juana Acosta, Eduard Fernández, Dafne Fernández, Eduardo Noriega, Belén Rueda, Pepón Nieto | Universal Pictures | |
| D E C E M B E R | 1 | Life and Nothing More (La vida y nada más) | Director: Antonio Méndez Esparza Cast: Andrew Bleechington, Regina Williams | Wanda Visión | |
| D E C E M B E R | 7 | Bomb Scared (Fe de etarras) | Director: Borja Cobeaga Cast: Javier Cámara, Julián López, Gorka Otxoa, Ramón Barea, Miren Ibarguren | Netflix | |

== Box office ==
The ten highest-grossing Spanish feature films in 2017, by domestic box office gross revenue, are as follows:

Highest-grossing films of 2017
| Rank | Title | Distributor | Admissions | Domestic gross (€) |
|---|---|---|---|---|
| 1 | Tad the Lost Explorer and the Secret of King Midas (Tadeo Jones 2: El secreto del rey Midas) | Paramount Pictures | 3,167,110 | 17,553,149 |
| 2 | Perfect Strangers (Perfectos desconocidos) | Universal Pictures | 2,020,940 | 12,969,658 |
| 3 | It's for Your Own Good (Es por tu bien) | Buena Vista International | 1,584,578 | 9,638,993 |
| 4 | Marrowbone (El secreto de Marrowbone) | Universal Pictures | 1,158,521 | 7,153,428 |
| 5 | Lord, Give Me Patience (Señor, dame paciencia) | Warner Bros. Pictures | 1,106,441 | 6,682,652 |
| 6 | Toc Toc | Warner Bros. Pictures | 1,062,594 | 6,098,493 |
| 7 | The Invisible Guardian (El guardián invisible) | DeAPlaneta | 608,658 | 3,695,417 |
| 8 | The Invisible Guest (Contratiempo) | Warner Bros. Pictures | 565,782 | 3,678,980 |
| 9 | Veronica (Verónica) | Sony Pictures | 606,595 | 3,494,474 |
| 10 | The Bar (El bar) | Sony Pictures | 470,465 | 2,831,155 |

== See also ==
- 32nd Goya Awards
