= 32nd Goya Awards =

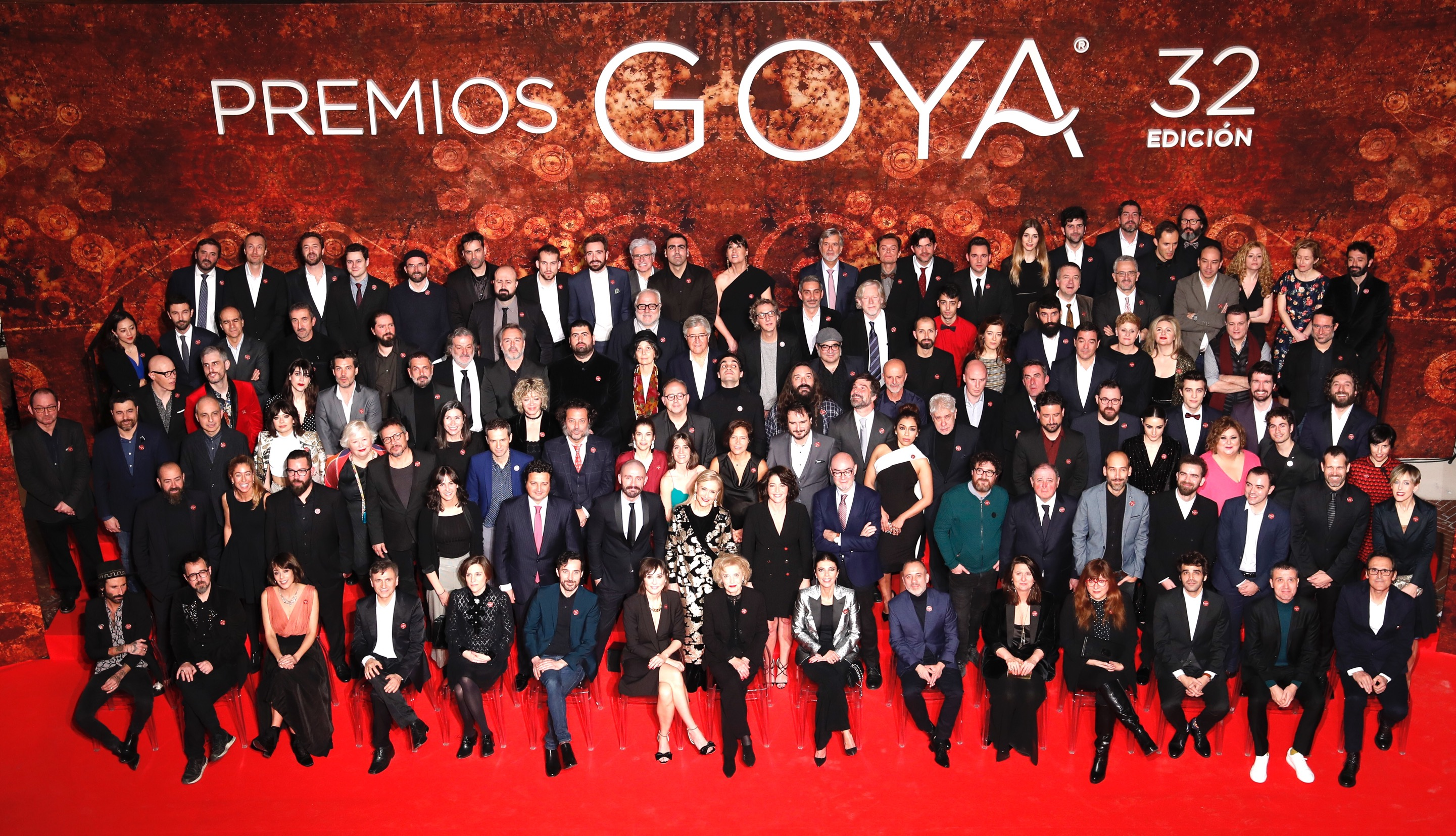
- 32nd Goya Awards nominees reception
- Date: 3 February 2018
- Site: Madrid Marriott Auditorium Hotel, Madrid
- Hosted by: Joaquín Reyes; Ernesto Sevilla

Highlights
- Best Film: The Bookshop
- Best Actor: Javier Gutiérrez; The Motive
- Best Actress: Nathalie Poza; Can't Say Goodbye
- Most awards: Giant (10)
- Most nominations: Giant (13)

Television coverage
- Network: La 1
- Viewership: 3.09 million (19.9%)

The 32nd Goya Awards were presented at the Madrid Marriott Auditorium Hotel in Madrid on 3 February 2018, to honour the best in Spanish films of 2017. Joaquín Reyes and Ernesto Sevilla hosted the awards ceremony.

Nominations were announced on 13 December 2017 by David Verdaguer and Bárbara Lennie. Giant received the most nominations with thirteen, followed by The Bookshop with twelve nominations.

The Bookshop won Best Film, as well as Best Director and Best Adapted Screenplay, but Giant won the most awards, with ten awards, including Best Original Screenplay. The broadcast on La 1 commanded 3,086,000 viewers (19.9% audience share).

== Winners and nominees ==
The winners and nominees are listed as follows:

Best Film: The Bookshop; Giant; The Motive; Summer 1993; Veronica	Best Director: Isabel Coixet – The Bookshop; Manuel Martín Cuenca – The Motive; Aitor Arregi, Jon Garaño – Giant; Paco Plaza – Veronica
Best Actor: Javier Gutiérrez – The Motive; Andrés Gertrúdix – Dying; Javier Bardem – Loving Pablo; Antonio de la Torre – Abracadabra	Best Actress: Nathalie Poza – Can't Say Goodbye; Emily Mortimer – The Bookshop; Penélope Cruz – Loving Pablo; Maribel Verdú – Abracadabra
Best Supporting Actor: David Verdaguer – Summer 1993; José Mota – Abracadabra; Antonio de la Torre – The Motive; Bill Nighy – The Bookshop	Best Supporting Actress: Adelfa Calvo – The Motive; Anna Castillo – Holy Camp!; Belén Cuesta – Holy Camp!; Lola Dueñas – Can't Say Goodbye
Best New Actor: Eneko Sagardoy – Giant; Pol Monen – Amar: With You Until the End of the World; Eloi Costa – Skins; Santiago Alverú – Selfie	Best New Actress: Bruna Cusí – Summer 1993; Adriana Paz – The Motive; Itziar Castro – Skins; Sandra Escacena – Veronica
Best Original Screenplay: Aitor Arregi, Andoni de Carlos, Jon Garaño, Jose Mari Goenaga – Giant; Pablo Berger – Abracadabra; Carla Simón – Summer 1993; Fernando Navarro, Paco Plaza – Veronica	Best Adapted Screenplay: Isabel Coixet – The Bookshop; Alejandro Hernández, Manuel Martín Cuenca – The Motive; Agustí Villaronga, Coral Cruz – Uncertain Glory; Javier Ambrossi, Javier Calvo – Holy Camp!
Best Spanish Language Foreign Film: A Fantastic Woman (Chile); Amazona (Colombia); Tempestad (Mexico); Zama (Argentina)	Best European Film: The Square (Sweden); C'est la vie! (France); Lady Macbeth (United Kingdom); Toni Erdmann (Germany)
Best New Director: Carla Simón – Summer 1993; Javier Ambrossi, Javier Calvo – Holy Camp!; Sergio G. Sánchez – Marrowbone; Lino Escalera – Can't Say Goodbye	Best Animated Film: Tad the Lost Explorer and the Secret of King Midas; Deep; Nur eta herensugearen tenplua
Best Cinematography: Javier Agirre Erauso – Giant; Santiago Racaj – Summer 1993; Jean-Claude Larrieu – The Bookshop; Paco Femenía – Gold	Best Editing: Laurent Dufreche, Raúl López – Giant; David Gallart – Abracadabra; Ana Pfaff, Didac Palou – Summer 1993; Bernat Aragonés – The Bookshop
Best Art Direction: Mikel Serrano – Giant; Alain Bainée – Abracadabra; Llorenç Miquel – The Bookshop; Javier Fernández – Gold	Best Production Supervision: Ander Sistiaga – Giant; Mireia Graell Vivancos – Summer 1993; Alex Boyd, Jordi Berenguer – The Bookshop; Luis Fernández Lago – Gold
Best Sound: Aitor Berenguer, Gabriel Gutiérrez, Nicolas de Poulpiquet – Veronica; Daniel de Zayas, Pelayo Gutiérrez, Alberto Ovejero – The Motive; Sergio Bürmann, David Rodríguez, Nicolas de Poulpiquet – The Bar; Iñaki Díez, Xanti Salvador – Giant	Best Special Effects: Jon Serrano, David Heras – Giant; Reyes Abades, Isidro Jiménez – Gold; Raúl Romanillos, David Heras – Veronica; Reyes Abades, Curro Muñoz – Rescue Under Fire
Best Costume Design: Saioa Lara – Giant; Paco Delgado – Abracadabra; Mercè Paloma – The Bookshop; Tatiana Hernández – Gold	Best Makeup and Hairstyles: Ainhoa Eskisabel, Olga Cruz, Gorka Aguirre – Giant; Sylvie Imbert, Paco Rodríguez – Abracadabra; Eli Adánez, Sergio Pérez Berbel, Pedro de Diego – Gold; Lola Gómez, Jesús Gil, Óscar del Monte – Skins
Best Original Score: Pascal Gaigne – Giant; Alberto Iglesias – The Summit; Alfonso Vilallonga – The Bookshop; Chucky Namanera (Eugenio Mira) – Veronica	Best Original Song: Leiva – "La llamada" (Holy Camp!); José Luis Perales – "Algunas veces" (The Motive); Alfonso Vilallonga – "Feeling Lonely on a Sunday Afternoon" (The Bookshop); Roque Baños – "Rap zona hostil" (Rescue Under Fire)
Best Fictional Short Film: Mother; Australia; Baraka; Como yo te amo; Extraños en la carretera	Best Animated Short Film: Woody & Woody; Colores; El ermitaño; Un día en el parque
Best Documentary Film: Muchos hijos, un mono y un castillo; Cantábrico, los dominios del oso pardo; Dancing Beethoven; Saura(s)	Best Documentary Short Film: Los desheredados; Primavera rosa en México; The Fourth Kingdom; Tribus de la Inquisición

=== Films with multiple nominations and awards ===
Films with multiple nominations
Nominations	Film
13	Giant
12	The Bookshop
9	The Motive
8	Abracadabra
8	Summer 1993
7	Veronica
6	Gold
5	Holy Camp!
3	Can't Say Goodbye
3	Skins
2	Loving Pablo

Films with multiple awards
Film	Awards
10	Giant
3	The Bookshop
3	Summer 1993
2	The Motive

== Honorary Goya ==
- Marisa Paredes

== Controversy ==
The fashion designer David Delfín, who died on 3 June 2017, and the actress Amparo Pacheco, who died on 27 April 2017, were not included in the In Memoriam section of the ceremony, which was protested by some of their relatives.
