= 23rd Forqué Awards =

2018 Spanish film and television awards

- Date: 13 January 2018
- Site: Palacio de Congresos, Zaragoza, Spain
- Hosted by: Elena S. Sánchez; Boris Izaguirre
- Organized by: EGEDA

Highlights
- Best Picture: The Motive & The Bookshop
- Best Actor: Javier Gutiérrez; The Motive
- Best Actress: Nathalie Poza; Can't Say Goodbye

Television coverage
- Network: La 1

The 23rd Forqué Awards ceremony, presented by EGEDA, was held on 13 January 2018 at the Palacio de Congresos in Zaragoza. The gala was hosted by Elena S. Sánchez and Boris Izaguirre.

== History ==
The nominations were disclosed in December 2017. Organised by EGEDA, the awards had the participation of Gobierno de Aragón and the Aragón Film Commission; and the collaboration of support from Palacio de Congresos de Zaragoza, Safe Creative and Fundación Aisge, which presented the best performance awards.

Broadcast on La 1, the ceremony was held at the Palacio de Congresos in Zaragoza on 13 January 2018. The gala featured comedic gags by Edu Soto and musical performances by Sergio Dalma, Pastora Soler, Efecto Pasillo and OT 2017's contestants Nerea, Cepeda, Raoul, Mireya, Ricky, Marina, Thalía, Juan Antonio and Mimi.

Carlos Saura was gifted the EGEDA Gold Medal recognizing a career in the film industry.

== Winners and nominees ==
The winners and nominees are listed as follows:

Best Fiction or Animation Film: The Motive; The Bookshop; Abracadabra; Giant; Summer 1993	Best Documentary Film: Muchos hijos, un mono y un castillo; Alberto García-Alix: La línea de la sombra; Dancing Beethoven; Saura(s); Sara Baras: todas las voces
Best Male Performance in a Film: Javier Gutiérrez — The Motive; Andrés Gertrúdix — Dying; David Verdaguer — Summer 1993; Juan Diego — Can't Say Goodbye	Best Female Performance in a Film: Nathalie Poza — Can't Say Goodbye; Adelfa Calvo — The Motive; Anna Castillo — Holy Camp!; Bruna Cusí — Summer 1993; Marian Álvarez — Dying; Maribel Verdú — Abracadabra
Best Short Film: Mother; Los desheredados; Tabib	Best Latin-American Film: A Fantastic Woman; The Summit; April's Daughter; Last Days in Havana; Mi mundial
Cinema and Education in Values: The Healer; Giant; Deep
