= Torremolinos 73 =

- Spanish theatrical release poster
- Directed by: Pablo Berger
- Written by: Pablo Berger
- Starring: Javier Cámara; Candela Peña; Juan Diego; Fernando Tejero; Mads Mikkelsen; Malena Alterio; Ramón Barea; Nuria González; Tina Sainz
- Production companies: Telespan; Estudios Picasso; Nimbus Film; Mama Films
- Distributed by: Buena Vista International (Spain); Angel Films (Denmark)
- Release date: 26 April 2003 (Málaga)
- Running time: 91 minutes
- Countries: Spain; Denmark
- Languages: Spanish; Danish

Torremolinos 73 is a 2003 Spanish-Danish comedy film written and directed by Pablo Berger. It stars Javier Cámara, Candela Peña, and Juan Diego.

== Plot ==
Alfredo López is an exasperated encyclopedia salesman for the Montoya Publishing House and lives with his faithful wife Carmen in 1973 Spain. Carmen and Alfredo are given the opportunity by the Montoya Publishing House to create pornographic films that will be imported into Scandinavian countries under the pretence of being an audiovisual encyclopedia of human reproduction. They have no other choice as Alfredo's encyclopedia sales are practically zero and Carmen loses her job. Unknowingly, Carmen becomes an adult film star in the Northern European countries though they are well-paid for their films. In the meantime Alfredo and Carmen are trying to have a child and Carmen discovers that Alfredo has a sperm count of zero.

Inspired to become a film-maker, Alfredo writes an Ingmar Bergman-inspired feature film titled Torremolinos 73. His boss offers to fund the filming of it with Alfredo as director and Carmen as the female star. Alfredo also gets a Danish film crew to help with production. The main role is offered to Máximo Valverde who refuses it, so the role is offered to Magnus, one of the members of the film crew.

At Carmen's suggestion, Alfredo's boss changes the final scene so that Carmen is to have sex with her male co-star so as to get herself pregnant. Alfredo is upset at first but eventually accepts this and the film ends with the couple having a daughter, and Alfredo beginning a new career as a wedding film director.

== Cast ==
- Javier Cámara as Alfredo López
- Candela Peña as Carmen García
- Juan Diego as Don Carlos
- Malena Alterio as Vanessa
- Fernando Tejero as Juan Luis
- Mads Mikkelsen as Magnus
- Ramón Barea as Sr. Romerales
- Nuria González as Sra. Romerales
- Tina Sáinz as Doña Isabel
- Thomas Bo Larsen as Dennis
- Sixten Kai Nielsen as Ole

== Production ==
Torremolinos 73 was produced by Telespan, Estudios Picasso, Nimbus Film, and Mama Films.

== Release ==
Torremolinos 73 screened at the 6th Málaga Film Festival in April 2003.

== Reception ==
Torremolinos 73 has an approval rating of 71% on review aggregator website Rotten Tomatoes, based on 41 reviews, and an average rating of 6.5/10. The website's critical consensus states: "A light tale that's big on heart, this spicy snapshot of domestic sexuality in '70s Spain treats its wacky protagonists with enough gentle humanity to be delightfully entertaining". Metacritic assigned the film a weighted average score of 62 out of 100, based on 18 critics, indicating generally favourable reviews.

== See also ==
- List of Spanish films of 2003
