= Amparo Pacheco =

Spanish actress

- Born: 30 November 1924; La Solana, Ciudad Real
- Died: 27 April 2017 (aged 92); Madrid
- Occupation: Actress

Amparo Pacheco (30 November 1924 - 27 April 2017) was a Spanish actress.

== Life and career ==
She was born on 30 November 1924. In 2002, at his 77, she appeared in the TV series Cuéntame cómo pasó.

She died on 27 April 2017 at aged 92. She wasn't recognised in the In Memoriam section of the 32nd Goya Awards alongside the designer David Delfín, who died on 3 June 2017.

== Filmography ==
=== Film ===
- 2003: Pacto de brujas as Isidra

=== Television ===
- 2002-2016: Cuéntame cómo pasó as Sagrario
- 2012: Stamos okupa2
- 2008: El síndrome de Ulises
- 2008: La que se avecina as Matilde
- 2006-2007: Manolo y Benito Corporeision as Marita
- 2005-2006: A tortas con la vida as Brígida
- 2003-2004: Aquí no hay quien viva as Amparo
