= Gold (2017 film) =

- Theatrical release poster
- Spanish: Oro
- Directed by: Agustín Díaz Yanes
- Screenplay by: Agustín Díaz Yanes; Arturo Pérez-Reverte
- Based on: A story by by Arturo Pérez-Reverte
- Produced by: Enrique López Lavigne; Mikel Lejarza; Mercedes Gamero; Axel Kuschevatzky
- Starring: Raúl Arévalo; Bárbara Lennie; Óscar Jaenada; José Coronado
- Cinematography: Gabriel Arias-Salgado
- Edited by: Marta Velasco
- Music by: Javier Limón
- Production companies: Apache Films; Atresmedia Cine; Tezutlan Films; Movistar+; Sony Pictures International Productions; Áralan Films; Cine365 films
- Distributed by: Sony Pictures
- Release dates: 7 November 2017 (SEFF); 10 November 2017 (Spain)
- Running time: 103 minutes
- Country: Spain
- Language: Spanish
- Budget: €8 million
- Box office: €1.3 million (Spain)

Gold (Spanish: Oro) is a 2017 Spanish historical drama film directed by Agustín Díaz Yanes. The film is based on a short story by Arturo Pérez-Reverte and depicts a 16th-century Spanish expedition during the colonization of the Americas aiming at locating El Dorado. It is loosely inspired on expeditions by conquistadors Hernán Cortés, Lope de Aguirre and Núñez de Balboa.

== Plot ==
A group of Spanish conquistadors for Charles V, Holy Roman Emperor travels through the American jungle, following a route that will lead them to the legendary city of gold of Tezutlan as recorded by a previous expedition. The forty men and women are nominally captained by the aging nobleman Don Gonzalo de Baztán and his young wife Ana, but actually commanded by brutal, gold-hungry veteran Ensign Juan de Gorriamendi. Tensions arise in the group due to the jungle's perils and their own grudges with each other, including the unpopularity of Don Gonzalo due to his summary executions and the growing attraction between Ana and one of the soldiers, Italian Wars veteran Martín Dávila, who rivals Gorriamendi for her.

After crossing a river filled with alligators, the expedition is told by messenger Jeromillo that the governor who sanctioned the mission has been deposed, and that his successor has sent another contingent under the command of Captain Juan Medrano to catch up with them, planning to execute Don Gonzalo and override the expedition. In order to avoid Medrano, and by advice of the group's local guide, Chocó auxiliary Mediamano, the group turns towards a territory populated by hostile Carib tribes. However, ultimately deciding against Don Gonzalo's incompetent leadership, the conquistadors revolt against him and have him killed anyway, with Gorriamendi taking over the mission. The ensign also becomes Ana's forceful lover, further digging a trench between Dávila and him.

The group reaches a peaceful tribal village where they find Manuel Requena, a survivor of the first expedition who settled down and started a family with a native woman. Despite their help, events go awry when Jeromillo turns out to be a traitor who had allowed Medrano to follow them, causing the village to be massacred and burned by the pursuers. The expedition organizes an ambush and defeats Medrano's forces, executing the captain in retaliation and integrating the survivors into their own, dwindling numbers. Afterwards, they continue until Río Grande, which separates them from the region where Tezutlan is supposedly located.

A savage local tribe attacks them next, exerting psychological warfare with poisoned darts and war chants, but the Spaniards counter it with a vihuela song by Dávila's idea and turn the tables on them. The group then attacks the tribe's village, coming victorious despite being ambushed and outnumbered. However, upon finding cannibalized remnants of Spanish soldiers in the shacks, soldiers led by Gorriamendi and Catholic priest Father Vargas intend to retaliate by executing the village's women and children, causing a scuffle against Dávila in which Mediamano is killed. As a consequence, rebelling against Charles V's orders, Gorriamendi and his followers try to kill the rest of the conquistadors. Ana dies in the fight, but her sacrifice allows the loyalists to defeat and execute Gorriamendi.

With the expedition now reduced to four men led by Sergeant Bastaurrés, their route takes them through a battlefield between two warring tribes. Dávila and soldier Barbate manage to make it out alive, eventually reaching the city of Tezutlan on the Pacific Ocean coast, only to discover the legendary gold city is just a pauper village with gold-colored glazed clay roofings. Realizing all was for nothing, and despite knowing they will be probably executed for all the trouble when they return, Dávila takes possession of the territory for the Spanish crown.

== Cast ==
- Raúl Arévalo as Martín Dávila
- Bárbara Lennie as Doña Ana de Baztán
- Óscar Jaenada as Ensign Juan de Gorriamendi
- José Coronado as Sergeant Lorenzo Bastaurrés
- José Manuel Cervino as Don Gonzalo de Baztán
- Antonio Dechent as Barbate
- Juan José Ballesta as Iturbe
- Luis Callejo as Father Vargas
- Anna Castillo as La Parda
- Andrés Gertrúdix as Licenciado Ulzama
- Diego París as Diego de Marchena
- Juan Carlos Aduviri as Chima "Mediamano"
- Josean Bengoetxea as Aresti
- José Manuel Poga as Romero
- Juan Diego as Manuel Requena
- Daniel Cebrián as Don Juan Medrano

== Release ==
A 7 November 2017 world premiere at the Teatro Lope de Vega within the non-competitive slate of the Seville European Film Festival (SEFF) was programmed ahead of the wide theatrical release in Spain by Sony Pictures on 10 November 2017.

== Reception ==
Pere Vall of Fotogramas rated the film 3 out of 5 stars, assessing that, while imperfect, the films contains much of the best Díaz Yanes, highlighting the acting duel between Arévalo and Jaenada as the best thing about the film alongside Ballesta's candor.

Javier Ocaña of El País pointed out that "in spite of its obvious virtues, which are not few", there is also something in the film making it fall apart: "its irregularity".

Oti Rodríguez Marchante of ABC rated the film 3 out of 5 stars, deeming it to be "a bitter, pessimistic film, with few moments of greatness", but "which sums up a state of mind and country", likewise assessing that all the actors are superb.

Arturo Pérez-Reverte complained about the film's purported deviation from his short story, tweeting: "in an original story of both epic and cruelty, they forgot the epic." Later in 2019, Reverte added: "in the base script there were cruelty and epic, harshness and light; upon making the film, the team did not see the epic and instead gave out a gang of delinquents. The admirable part vanished."

== Accolades ==
| Year | Award | Category | Nominee(s) | Result | Ref. |
|---|---|---|---|---|---|
| 2018 | 32nd Goya Awards | Best Cinematography | Paco Femenía | Nominated | |
| 2018 | 32nd Goya Awards | Best Art Direction | Javier Fernández | Nominated | |
| 2018 | 32nd Goya Awards | Best Production Supervision | Luis Fernández Lago | Nominated | |
| 2018 | 32nd Goya Awards | Best Special Effects | Reyes Abades and Isidro Jiménez | Nominated | |
| 2018 | 32nd Goya Awards | Best Costume Design | Tatiana Hernández | Nominated | |
| 2018 | 32nd Goya Awards | Best Makeup and Hairstyles | Eli Adánez, Sergio Pérez Berbel and Pedro de Diego | Nominated | |
| 2018 | 27th Actors and Actresses Union Awards | Best Film Actor in a Minor Role | Juan Diego | Nominated | |

== See also ==
- List of Spanish films of 2017
