= Can't Say Goodbye =

2017 Spanish film directed by Lino Escalera

- Theatrical release poster
- Spanish: No sé decir adiós
- Directed by: Lino Escalera
- Screenplay by: Pablo Remón; Lino Escalera
- Starring: Nathalie Poza; Juan Diego; Lola Dueñas
- Cinematography: Santiago Racaj
- Edited by: Miguel Doblado
- Music by: Pablo Trujillo
- Production companies: Lolita Films; Mediaevs; White Leaf Producciones
- Release dates: 20 March 2017 (FMCE); 19 May 2017 (Spain)
- Country: Spain
- Language: Spanish

Can't Say Goodbye (Spanish: No sé decir adiós) is a 2017 Spanish drama film directed by Lino Escalera starring Juan Diego, Nathalie Poza and Lola Dueñas.

== Plot ==
José Luis is diagnosed with a terminal lung cancer. His two daughters, Carla and Blanca, react to the news in different ways.

== Cast ==
- Nathalie Poza as Carla
- Juan Diego as José Luis
- Lola Dueñas as Blanca
- Pau Durà as Nacho
- Miki Esparbé
- Noa Fontanals as Irene
- Emilio Palacios
- Oriol Pla
- Greta Fernández
- Marc Martínez
- Xavi Sáez
- Pere Brasó

== Production ==
Can't Say Goodbye, Lino Escalera's feature film debut, was penned by Escalera alongside Pablo Remón. Other duties were entrusted to Santiago Racaj (cinematography), Miguel Doblado (editing) and Pablo Trujillo (score). The film was produced by Lolita Films, Mediaevs and White Leaf Producciones and it had the collaboration of ICAA, Castilla-La Mancha IV Centenario Cervantes and ECAM. Shooting began on 12 April 2016. Shooting locations included Girona, Salt, Llançà, Roses, Olot, and Almería.

== Release ==
The film had its world premiere at the Málaga Spanish Film Festival (FMCE) on 20 March 2017. Distributed by Súper 8 Distribución, it was theatrically released in Spain on 19 May 2017.

== Reception ==
Jonathan Holland of The Hollywood Reporter deemed Can't Say Goodbye to be an "austere, thought-provoking and wonderfully acted" film, having as hallmarks "a trio of sterling performances and an unwavering eye on emotional authenticity", concluding that it was a "a troubling but rewarding emotional X-ray".

Andrea G. Bermejo of Cinemanía rated the film with 4 out of 5 stars, considering that "it is like a slap in the face that wakes you up", writing that Nathalie Poza was knocking on the doors of all film awards with her performance, "managing to narrate without words what happens to her character inside".

== Awards and nominations ==
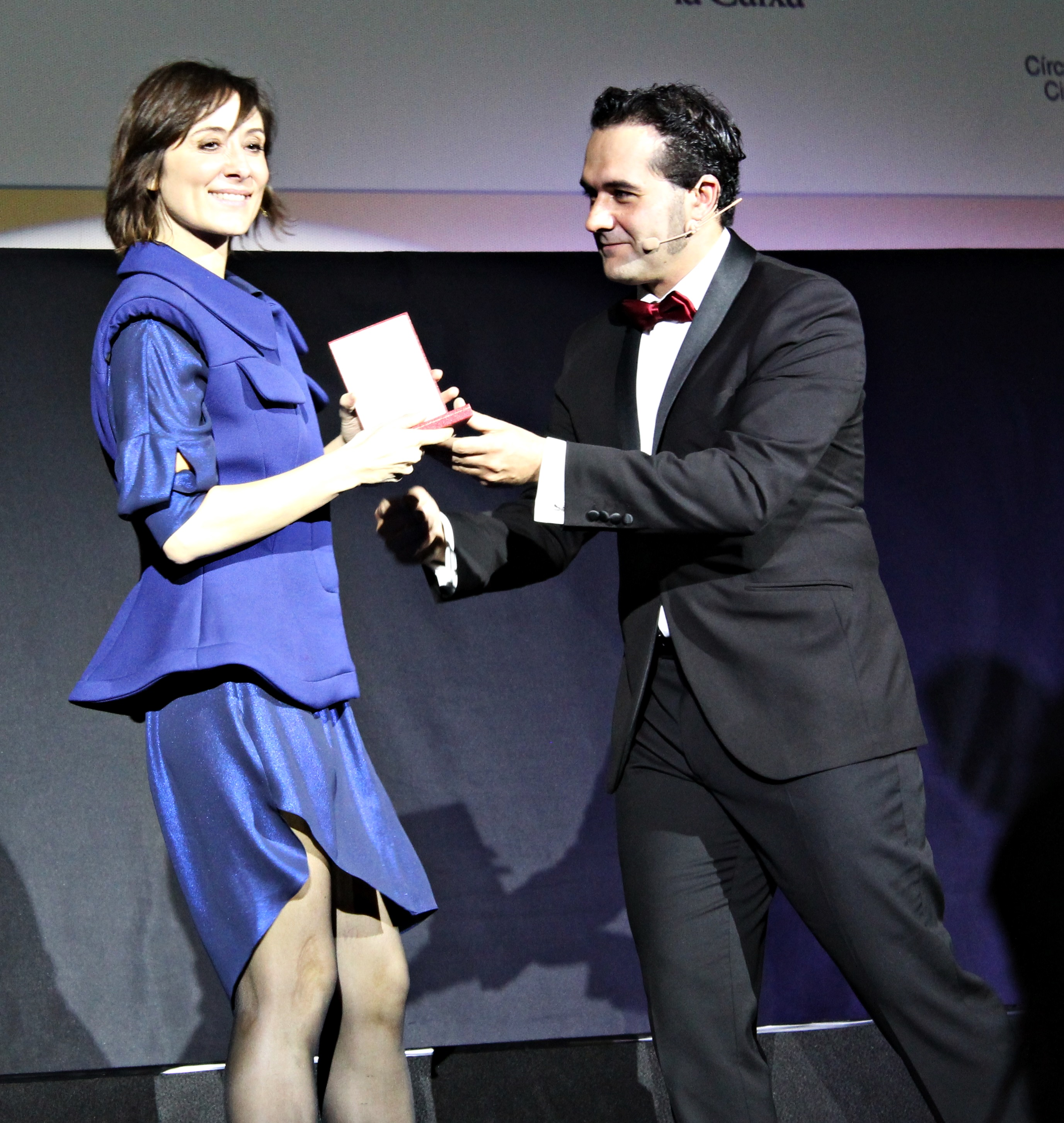
Nathalie Poza collecting her CEC Medal for Best Actress

Year	Award	Category	Nominee(s)	Result	Ref.
2017	Málaga Film Festival	Silver Biznaga for Jury's Special Award		Won	
2017	Málaga Film Festival	Silver Biznaga for Best Actress	Nathalie Poza	Won	
2017	Málaga Film Festival	Silver Biznaga for Best Supporting Actor	Juan Diego	Won	
2017	Málaga Film Festival	Silver Biznaga for Best Screenplay	Juan Remón, Lino Escalera	Won	
2018	23rd Forqué Awards	Best Actress	Nathalie Poza	Won	
2018	23rd Forqué Awards	Best Actor	Juan Diego	Nominated	
2018	5th Feroz Awards	Best Drama Film		Nominated	
2018	5th Feroz Awards	Best Screenplay	Pablo Remón, Lino Escalera	Nominated	
2018	5th Feroz Awards	Best Actress (film)	Nathalie Poza	Won	
2018	5th Feroz Awards	Best Supporting Actress (film)	Lola Dueñas	Nominated	
2018	5th Feroz Awards	Best Supporting Actor (film)	Juan Diego	Nominated	
2018	73rd CEC Medals	Best Actress	Nathalie Poza	Won	
2018	73rd CEC Medals	Best Supporting Actress	Lola Dueñas	Won	
2018	73rd CEC Medals	Best New Director	Lino Escalera	Nominated	
2018	32nd Goya Awards	Best Actress	Nathalie Poza	Won	
2018	32nd Goya Awards	Best Supporting Actress	Lola Dueñas	Nominated	
2018	32nd Goya Awards	Best New Director	Lino Escalera	Nominated	
2018	27th Actors and Actresses Union Awards	Best Film Actress in a Leading Role	Nathalie Poza	Won	
2018	27th Actors and Actresses Union Awards	Best Film Actor in a Secondary Role	Juan Diego	Won	

== See also ==
- List of Spanish films of 2017
