= Altzo =

Coordinates: 43°06′01″N 2°05′03″W

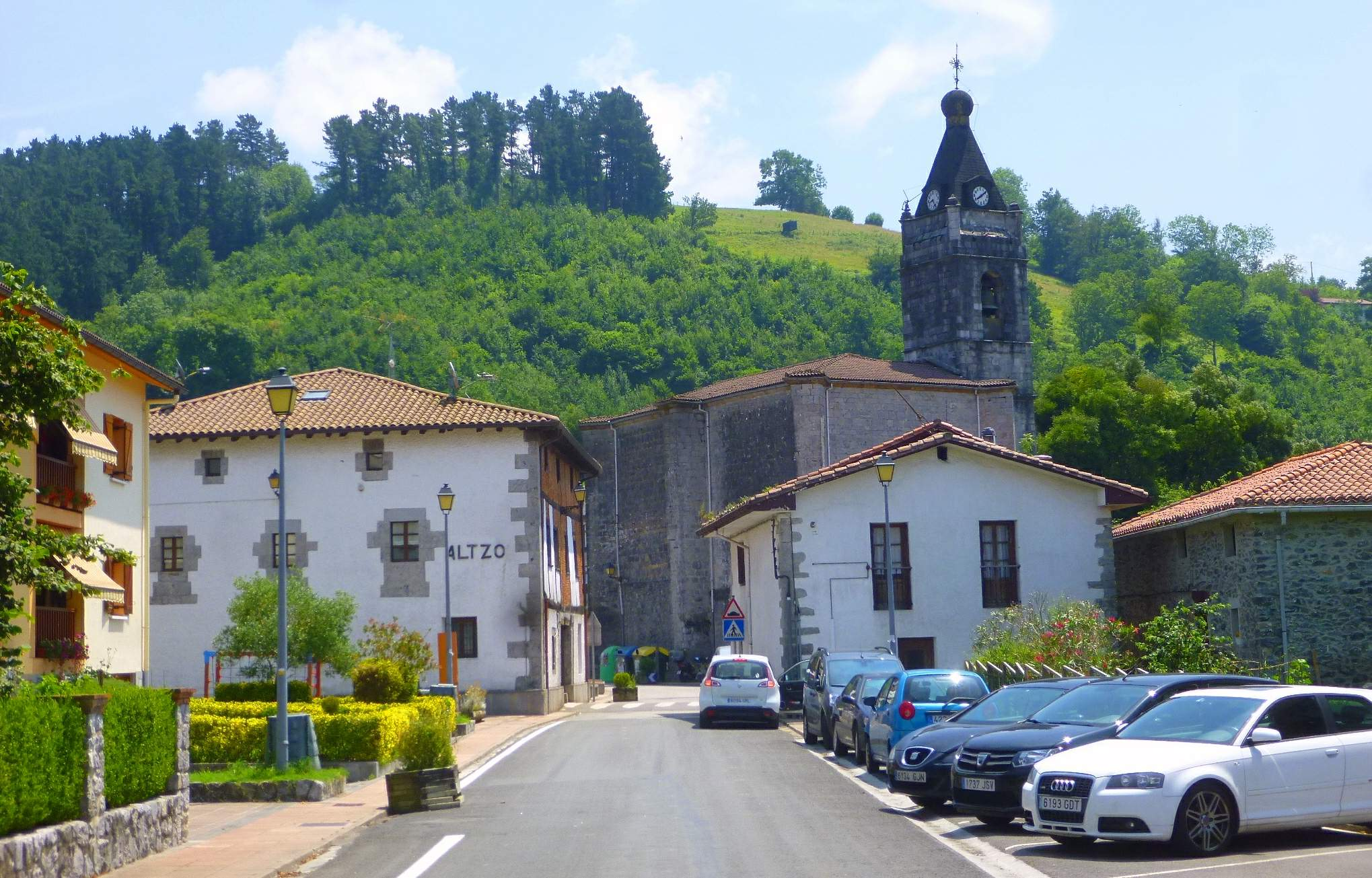
- Street in Altzo

- Coat of arms

- Location in Spain.
- Country: Spain
- Autonomous community: Gipuzkoa

Area
  - Total: 9.77 km^{2} (3.77 sq mi)

Population (2025-01-01)
  - Total: 447
  - Density: 45.8/km^{2} (118/sq mi)
- Time zone: UTC+1 (CET)
  - Summer (DST): UTC+2 (CEST)
- Website: www.altzo.net

Altzo is a town located in the province of Gipuzkoa, in the autonomous community of Basque Country, in the north of Spain. In 2014, Altzo had a total population of approximately 400.
