= Dying (2017 film) =

- Theatrical release poster
- Spanish: Morir
- Directed by: Fernando Franco
- Screenplay by: Fernando Franco; Coral Cruz
- Based on: Dying (1895) by Arthur Schnitzler
- Produced by: Fernando Franco; Koldo Zuazua
- Starring: Marian Álvarez; Andrés Gertrúdix
- Cinematography: Santiago Racaj
- Edited by: Miguel Doblado
- Production companies: Ferdydurke Films; Kowalski Films
- Distributed by: Golem Distribución
- Release dates: 27 September 2017 (Zinemaldia); 6 October 2017 (Spain)
- Country: Spain
- Language: Spanish

Dying (Spanish: Morir) is a 2017 Spanish drama film directed by Fernando Franco which stars Marian Álvarez and Andrés Gertrúdix.

== Plot ==
The plot concerns about the deterioration of Marta and Luis' life as a couple upon the development of a terminal illness by Luis.

== Cast ==
- Marian Álvarez as Marta
- Andrés Gertrúdix as Luis
- Bingen Loinaz
- César Sarachu
- Edu Rejón
- Francesco Carril
- Íñigo Aranburu
- Mikele Urroz
- Pablo Gómez-Pando
- Itziar Ituño
- Maica Barroso
- Mila Videgain
- Raquel García

== Production ==
Penned by Fernando Franco and Coral Cruz, the screenplay of Dying is a free adaptation of the 1895 work of the same name by Arthur Schnitzler. The film is a Kowalski Films and Ferdydurke Films production, in association with Film Factory Entertainment. It also had the participation of ETB, Canal Sur and Movistar+ and support from ICAA, Gobierno Vasco, Junta de Andalucía, and Diputación Foral de Bizkaia. It was shot in the Basque Country, Cantabria, Madrid and Seville.

== Release ==
The film premiered at the 65th San Sebastián International Film Festival on 27 September 2017, selected as an official selection's 'Special Screening'. Distributed by Golem Distribución, it was theatrically released in Spain on 6 October 2017.

== Reception ==
Jordi Costa of Fotogramas rated the film 4 out of 5 stars, assessing that while Gertrúdix is superb, "the film IS Marian Álvarez, gigantic, [with her character] wasting away before the consumed body of her loved one."

Alberto Bermejo of El Mundo rated the film 4 out of 5 stars, describing it, above all, as "an intimate chronicle, almost interior, of overflowing authenticity, of truth sustained by the two main characters", praising the outstanding work from the two protagonists while warning it is not a film suitable for everyone.

== Accolades ==
Year	Award	Category	Nominee(s)	Result	Ref.
2018	23rd Forqué Awards	Best Actress	Marian Álvarez	Nominated	
2018	23rd Forqué Awards	Best Actor	Andrés Gertrúdix	Nominated	
2018	5th Feroz Awards	Best Actress	Marian Álvarez	Nominated	
2018	5th Feroz Awards	Best Actor	Andrés Gertrúdix	Nominated	
2018	32nd Goya Awards	Best Actor	Andrés Gertrúdix	Nominated	

== See also ==
- List of Spanish films of 2017
