= Marrowbone (film) =

2017 film by Sergio G. Sánchez

- Theatrical release poster
- Spanish: El secreto de Marrowbone
- Directed by: Sergio G. Sánchez
- Written by: Sergio G. Sánchez
- Produced by: Belén Atienza; Álvaro Augustín; Ghislain Barrois
- Starring: George MacKay; Anya Taylor-Joy; Charlie Heaton; Mia Goth; Matthew Stagg; Kyle Soller; Nicola Harrison; Tom Fisher
- Cinematography: Xavi Giménez
- Edited by: Elena Ruiz
- Music by: Fernando Velázquez
- Production companies: Lionsgate International; Mediaset; Marrowbone; Telecinco Cinema; Ruidos en el Ático, AIE.; Movistar+
- Distributed by: Universal Pictures
- Release dates: 11 September 2017 (TIFF); 27 October 2017 (Spain)
- Running time: 110 minutes
- Country: Spain
- Language: English
- Budget: €8 million (est. $9.9 million)
- Box office: $12.3 million

Marrowbone (Spanish: El secreto de Marrowbone, lit. 'The Secret of Marrowbone') is a 2017 English-language Spanish psychological horror mystery drama film written and directed by Sergio G. Sánchez, and starring George MacKay, Anya Taylor-Joy, Charlie Heaton, Mia Goth, and Matthew Stagg. The film tells the story of the titular Marrowbone siblings (MacKay, Heaton, Goth, and Stagg), who relocate from England to their mother's ancestral estate in Maine, where they are faced by a sinister presence at home. Marrowbone was screened in the Special Presentations section at the 2017 Toronto International Film Festival and released in Spain on 27 October 2017 by Universal Pictures.

== Plot ==
In 1968, Rose Fairbairn brings her four children: Jack, Jane, Billy, and Sam from England to her childhood home, the Marrowbone Residence, in rural Maine. She tells them they will use 'Marrowbone', Rose's maiden name. A local girl named Allie befriends them. Rose's health worsens and she soon dies, leaving Jack, the eldest, to care for his siblings. Before dying, Rose makes Jack promise that he and his siblings stay together and hide the news of her death until he can become their legal guardian. Later, a man shows up on the property, causing Jane and Jack to panic.

Six months later, the siblings still live in the house, with mirrors covered to protect from a "ghost" in the loft. Jack visits the town for necessities and courts Allie, a library employee, while hiding his past. Tom Porter, the town lawyer managing the Marrowbone estate, has unrequited feelings for Allie.

Tom tells Jack he will collect the fee and Rose's signature to finalize the estate transfer to her. Desperate for money and fearing Tom will find out about Rose's death, the siblings decide to use their father's money box and forge her signature on the papers. After several incidents, they believe the "ghost" is their father, who was bricked up in the attic and left to starve after discovering them.

Meanwhile, Tom attempts to persuade Allie to come to New York with him, where he is set to begin a new job at a big law firm, but Allie rejects his advances. Before leaving, he gives her information on the Marrowbone family's past. Allie learns that their father, Simon Fairbairn, was a serial killer who was convicted and later broke out of jail, possibly to hunt them down. She also learns that Simon abused Jane, and Sam is his and Jane's baby. Meanwhile, Jane is convinced that Simon is still alive.

Tom is informed that his new employer is no longer interested in an employee, but a partner. He is offered a share of the firm, which he doesn't have the money for. Tom believes the Marrowbone siblings have more money, and he blackmails Jack. Billy attempts to retrieve the money, which was thrown down the chimney. He encounters a living, but feral Simon and narrowly escapes with his life. Billy confronts Jack about Simon and urges Jack to deal with him together before Jack has a seizure. Jane decides they must tell Allie the truth. The siblings arrange for Allie to meet at the secluded spot where she and the siblings first met, but Allie only finds their diary. She reads it, which reveals that Simon found the house six months ago, and Jack locked his siblings inside the attic to keep them safe. He tries to give Simon back the money box, who leads Jack to the secluded place, but is thrown from a cliff and knocked out by his vengeful sadistic father. When Jack regained consciousness, he returned to the house, only to realize Simon had murdered his siblings. After bricking up the attic, a devastated Jack prepared to commit suicide, but he developed multiple personalities of his siblings to convince himself they are still alive, covering all the mirrors in the house to avoid reminding himself that he is alone and going into the attic for the same reason.

Meanwhile, Tom arrives at the house and discovers a bricked attic entrance, convinced that the money is hidden there. He tears down the wall, but Simon attacks him. Allie goes to the Marrowbone house and finds Jack's various personalities arguing with one another. She tries to snap him out of it, but he drives her away, unwilling to accept his siblings' deaths. Noticing Tom's belongings, Allie ascends to the attic and finds the desiccated corpses of Billy, Jane, and Sam, and Tom dying from his wounds. She is attacked by Simon while calling out for Jack's alternate personalities for help. Eventually, Jack allows his "Billy" personality to take over and shoots Simon, killing him for good.

Sometime later, Allie cares for Jack after he is released from a psychiatric hospital. She disregards the doctor's recommendation to make sure Jack takes his medicine, knowing that Jack is happier when he believes his siblings are alive and well, and would never be alone again.

== Cast ==
- George MacKay as Jack Marrowbone
- Anya Taylor-Joy as Allie
- Charlie Heaton as William "Billy" Marrowbone
- Mia Goth as Jane Marrowbone
- Matthew Stagg as Samuel "Sam" Marrowbone
- Kyle Soller as Tom Porter
- Nicola Harrison as Rose Marrowbone
- Tom Fisher as Simon Fairbairn
- Myra Kathryn Pearse as Molly
- Paul Jesson as Doctor
- Robert Nairne as the Monster

== Production ==
In May 2016, it was announced Sergio G. Sánchez would write and direct the film, with J. A. Bayona executive producing, alongside Belen Atienza producing. In July 2016, Anya Taylor-Joy, Mia Goth, George MacKay and Charlie Heaton joined the cast of the film.

== Release ==
The film had its world premiere at the Toronto International Film Festival on 11 September 2017. It was released in Spain on 27 October 2017 by Universal Pictures. Marrowbone was also released theatrically in the United Kingdom on 13 July 2018. It was released digitally on 18 November.

=== Critical reception ===
On review aggregator website Rotten Tomatoes, the film has an approval rating of 49% based on 75 reviews, and an average rating of 5.40/10. The website's critical consensus reads, "Marrowbone's effective setting and strong cast can't make up for thinly conceived characters and a story short on genuine scares." On Metacritic, the film has a weighted average score of 63 out of 100, based on 5 critics, indicating "generally favorable reviews".

== Remake ==
A South Korean remake under the working title The Secret House was in production as of February 2024.

== See also ==
- List of Spanish films of 2017
