= Perfect Strangers (2017 film) =

- Theatrical release poster
- Spanish: Perfectos desconocidos
- Directed by: Álex de la Iglesia
- Screenplay by: Jorge Guerricaechevarría; Álex de la Iglesia
- Based on: Perfect Strangers by Filippo Bologna, Paolo Costella, Paolo Genovese, Paola Mammini and Rolando Ravello
- Produced by: Álvaro Augustin; Carolina Bang; Ghislain Barrois; Kiko Martínez; Paloma Molina
- Starring: Belén Rueda; Eduard Fernández; Ernesto Alterio; Juana Acosta; Eduardo Noriega; Dafne Fernández; Pepón Nieto
- Cinematography: Ángel Amorós
- Edited by: Domingo González
- Music by: Víctor Reyes
- Production companies: Telecinco Cinema; Pokeepsie Films; Nadie Es Perfecto
- Distributed by: Universal Pictures
- Release dates: 28 November 2017 (Madrid); 1 December 2017 (Spain)
- Running time: 97 minutes
- Country: Spain
- Language: Spanish
- Box office: $31 million

Perfect Strangers (Spanish: Perfectos desconocidos) is a 2017 Spanish comedy-drama film directed by Álex de la Iglesia remaking the 2016 Italian film of the same name. It stars Belén Rueda, Eduard Fernández, Ernesto Alterio, Juana Acosta, Eduardo Noriega, Dafne Fernández and Pepón Nieto.The film grossed €18.9 million at the box office by February 2018.

== Plot ==
Seven friends decide to play a game at their dinner party, in which each member needs to read aloud all incoming text messages or put phone calls on speaker for all to hear. This causes many revelations to materialize, and challenges the "normal" of everyone at the dinner.

== Cast ==
- Belén Rueda as Eva
- Eduard Fernández as Alfonso
- Ernesto Alterio as Antonio
- Juana Acosta as Ana
- Eduardo Noriega as Eduardo
- Dafne Fernández as Blanca
- Pepón Nieto as Pepe
- Beatriz Olivares as Sofía
- María Jesús Hoyos as Abuela
- Gonzalo Torralba as Javi
- Valentina Méndez as Rosa
- Alberto Bang as Gordi
- Luis Lobos Negros as Neighbour in lift

== Production ==
The film is a Telecinco Cinema, Pokeepsie Films and Nadie Es Perfecto production, with the participation of Mediaset España and Movistar+.

== Release ==
Distributed by Universal Pictures, the film was theatrically released in Spain on 1 December 2017.

== Box office ==
The film was the second highest-grossing Spanish language film of 2018 in Spain, with a box-office taking of €13 million from 2 million admissions. The film also stayed as one of the highest-grossing Spanish language films of 2018 in Spain, and finished third grossing €9.2 million from 1.3 million admissions. Worldwide it had grossed $31 million as of January 2019.

== See also ==
- List of Spanish films of 2017
- List of films featuring eclipses
