= Pablo Berger =

Spanish film director

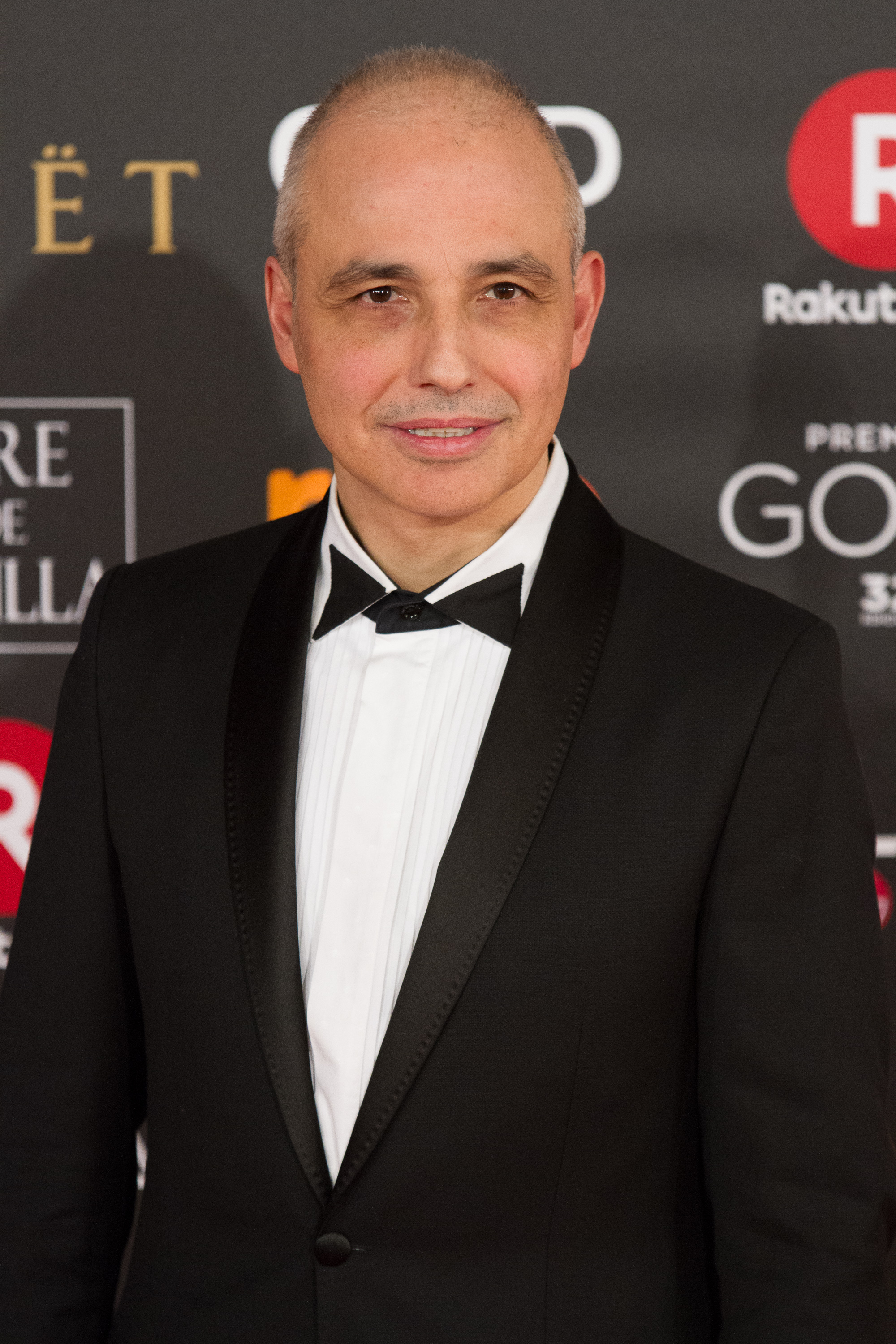
- Berger at the 32nd Goya Awards in 2018
- Born: Pablo Berger Uranga; 1963 (age 62–63); Bilbao, Spain

Pablo Berger Uranga (born 1963) is a Spanish film director and screenwriter. He is known for directing and writing the silent drama film Blancanieves (2012), the black comedy films Torremolinos 73 (2003) and Abracadabra (2017), and the animated tragicomedy film Robot Dreams (2023), the latter was nominated for the Academy Award for Best Animated Feature.

== Life and work ==
Berger attended primary and secondary school in Artxanda Trueba, located on the outskirts of Bilbao, Spain. In 1988, he directed his first short film, Mamá (Mum), with artistic director Álex de la Iglesia and Ramon Barea. With the financial winnings from a grant from the Provincial Council of Biscay, he went to study for a master’s in film at New York University. There, he directed his short film Truth and Beauty, for which he was nominated for an Emmy Award.

After earning his Ph.D., Berger worked as a professor of management at the New York Film Academy. Thereafter, he began a parallel career as a publicist and producer of music, culminating in 2003 with his first film Torremolinos 73, with Javier Cámara, Fernando Tejero, and Candela Peña. Torremolinos 73 received four Goya nominations and won Berger the Golden Biznaga at the Málaga Film Festival, as well as multiple national and international prizes. The movie became one of the box office successes of the year in Spain.

In 2012, Berger premiered his second film, Blancanieves (Snow White), which was the Spanish representative at the 85th Academy Awards for Best Foreign Language Film. Blancanieves won ten Goya Awards, including Best Film and Best Original Screenplay. It also earned Berger the Special Jury Prize at the San Sebastián International Film Festival. It was also nominated for the César Award for Best Foreign Film, as well as two European Film Awards for Best Film and Best Director.

In 2017, Berger premiered Abracadabra, a comedy starring again Maribel Verdú. This was his second film produced by Arcadia Motion Pictures. It became a critical success and received eight nominations at the 32nd Goya Awards.

Pablo Berger is a Knight of the Ordre des Arts et des Lettres of France. In 2018, Berger was invited to become a member of the Academy of Motion Picture Arts and Sciences.

In May 2023, Berger premiered Robot Dreams, his first animated film, at the 2023 Cannes Film Festival. The film was based on the graphic novel by American author Sara Varon, and was produced by Arcadia Motion Pictures. The film was sold internationally by Elle Driver and screened at the Annecy International Animation Film Festival, where it won the Contrechamp Grand Prix. It won the European Film Award for Best Animated Feature Film and the Annie Award for Best Independent Animated Feature, as well as two Goya Awards for Best Animated Film and Best Adapted Screenplay. In 2024, Berger was nominated for the Academy Award for Best Animated Feature for Robot Dreams, but lost to Hayao Miyazaki's The Boy and the Heron.

== Filmography ==
Year	Title	Director	Writer	Producer	Notes
1988	Mamá	Yes	Yes	No	Short film
2003	Torremolinos 73	Yes	Yes	Associate	Directorial debut
2012	Blancanieves	Yes	Yes	Yes	
2017	Abracadabra	Yes	Yes	Yes	
2023	Robot Dreams	Yes	Yes	Yes	

== Awards and nominations ==
Award	Year	Category	Work	Result	Ref.
Academy Awards	2024	Best Animated Feature	Robot Dreams	Nominated	
Alliance of Women Film Journalists	2023	Best Animated Film	Robot Dreams	Nominated	
Annecy International Animation Film Festival	2023	Contrechamp Grand Prix	Robot Dreams	Won	
Annie Awards	2024	Best Animated Feature – Independent	Robot Dreams	Won	
Annie Awards	2024	Best Direction – Feature	Robot Dreams	Nominated	
Annie Awards	2024	Best Writing – Feature	Robot Dreams	Nominated	
Argentine Film Critics Association	2015	Best Ibero-American Film	Blancanieves	Nominated	
Ariel Award	2013	Best Ibero-American Film	Blancanieves	Nominated	
Boston Society of Film Critics	2023	Best Animated Film	Robot Dreams	Runner-up (Note: Shared with Teenage Mutant Ninja Turtles: Mutant Mayhem, Spider-Man: Across the Spider-Verse and The Peasants.)	
Carmen Awards	2024	Best Non-Andalusian Produced Film	Robot Dreams	Nominated	
CEC Awards	2013	Best Film	Blancanieves	Won	
CEC Awards	2013	Best Director	Blancanieves	Won	
CEC Awards	2013	Best Screenplay	Blancanieves	Won	
CEC Awards	2018	Best Original Screenplay	Abracadabra	Nominated	
CEC Awards	2024	Best Film	Robot Dreams	Nominated	
CEC Awards	2024	Best Director	Robot Dreams	Nominated	
CEC Awards	2024	Best Adapted Screenplay	Robot Dreams	Nominated	
CEC Awards	2024	Best Animated Film	Robot Dreams	Won	
César Awards	2014	Best Foreign Film	Blancanieves	Nominated	
Chicago Film Critics Association	2023	Best Animated Film	Robot Dreams	Nominated	
Cinekid Festival	2023	Cinekid Lion for Best Children’s Film	Robot Dreams	Nominated	
Coronado Island Film Festival	2023	Best Animated Feature	Robot Dreams	Won	
European Film Awards	2013	European Film	Blancanieves	Nominated	
European Film Awards	2013	European Director	Blancanieves	Nominated	
European Film Awards	2023	European Animated Feature Film	Robot Dreams	Won	
Feroz Awards	2018	Best Comedy Film	Abracadabra	Nominated	
Feroz Awards	2024	Best Comedy Film	Robot Dreams	Won	
Florida Film Critics Circle	2023	Best Animated Film	Robot Dreams	Nominated	
Forqué Awards	2018	Best Picture	Abracadabra	Nominated	
Forqué Awards	2023	Best Animation Film	Robot Dreams	Won	
Gaudí Awards	2013	Best Film	Blancanieves	Won	
Gaudí Awards	2013	Best Director	Blancanieves	Nominated	
Gaudí Awards	2013	Best Screenplay	Blancanieves	Nominated	
Gaudí Awards	2024	Best Adapted Screenplay	Robot Dreams	Nominated	
Gaudí Awards	2024	Best Animated Film	Robot Dreams	Won	
Georgia Film Critics Association	2024	Best Animated Film	Robot Dreams	Nominated	
Goya Awards	2004	Best Original Screenplay	Torremolinos 73	Nominated	
Goya Awards	2004	Best New Director	Torremolinos 73	Nominated	
Goya Awards	2013	Best Film	Blancanieves	Won	
Goya Awards	2013	Best Director	Blancanieves	Nominated	
Goya Awards	2013	Best Original Screenplay	Blancanieves	Won	
Goya Awards	2013	Best Original Song for “No te puedo encontrar”	Blancanieves	Won	
Goya Awards	2018	Best Original Screenplay	Abracadabra	Nominated	
Goya Awards	2024	Best Adapted Screenplay	Robot Dreams	Won	
Goya Awards	2024	Best Animated Film	Robot Dreams	Won	
Houston Film Critics Society	2024	Best Animated Feature	Robot Dreams	Nominated	
Indiana Film Journalists Association	2023	Best Film	Robot Dreams	Nominated	
Indiana Film Journalists Association	2023	Best Animated Film	Robot Dreams	Runner-up	
Indiana Film Journalists Association	2023	Original Vision	Robot Dreams	Nominated	
International Cinephile Society	2024	Best Animated Film	Robot Dreams	Runner-up	
London Film Critics' Circle	2024	Animated Film of the Year	Robot Dreams	Nominated	
Los Angeles Film Critics Association	2023	Best Animated Film	Robot Dreams	Runner-up	
Málaga Film Festival	2003	Golden Biznaga for Best Spanish Film	Torremolinos 73	Won	
Málaga Film Festival	2003	Best Director	Torremolinos 73	Won	
Nevada Film Critics Society	2024	Best Animated Feature	Robot Dreams	Won	
New York Latin ACE Awards	2013	Best Film	Blancanieves	Won	
Online Film Critics Society	2024	Best Animated Film	Robot Dreams	Nominated	
Palm Springs International Film Festival	2004	New Voices/New Visions Award	Torremolinos 73	Won	
Palm Springs International Film Festival	2013	Cine Latino Award	Blancanieves	Won	
San Sebastián International Film Festival	2012	Special Jury Prize	Blancanieves	Won	
San Diego Film Critics Society	2023	Best Animated Film	Robot Dreams	Nominated	
San Francisco Bay Area Film Critics Circle	2024	Best Animated Film	Robot Dreams	Nominated	
Sant Jordi Awards	2013	Best Spanish Film	Blancanieves	Won	
Satellite Awards	2024	Best Animated or Mixed Media Feature	Robot Dreams	Nominated	
Saturn Awards	2014	Best International Film	Blancanieves	Nominated	
Sitges Film Festival	2023	Best Film	Robot Dreams	Nominated	
Sitges Film Festival	2023	Grand People's Choice Award for Best Feature Film in the SOFC	Robot Dreams	Won	
St. Louis Film Critics Association	2023	Best Animated Film	Robot Dreams	Nominated	
Toronto Film Critics Association	2023	Best Animated Film	Robot Dreams	Won	
Vancouver Film Critics Circle	2014	Best Foreign Language Film	Blancanieves	Nominated	
