= Rescue Under Fire =

- Theatrical release poster
- Spanish: Zona hostil
- Directed by: Adolfo Martínez
- Screenplay by: Luis Arranz; Andrés M. Koppel
- Produced by: Javier López Blanco
- Starring: Ariadna Gil; Raúl Mérida; Roberto Álamo; Antonio Garrido; Ingrid García Jonsson; Jacobo Dicenta; Ismael Martínez; Nasser Saleh; Mariam Hernández; Ruth Gabriel
- Cinematography: Alfredo Mayo
- Edited by: Mapa Pastor; Manuel Bauer
- Music by: Roque Baños
- Production companies: Tornasol Films; Castafiore Films; Hernández y Fernández PC; Rescate AIE
- Distributed by: eOne Films
- Release date: 10 March 2017
- Country: Spain
- Languages: Spanish; English
- Budget: €5 million

Rescue Under Fire (Spanish: Zona hostil) is a 2017 Spanish war film directed by Adolfo Martínez set in Afghanistan. It stars Ariadna Gil, Raúl Mérida, Roberto Álamo and Antonio Garrido.

== Plot ==
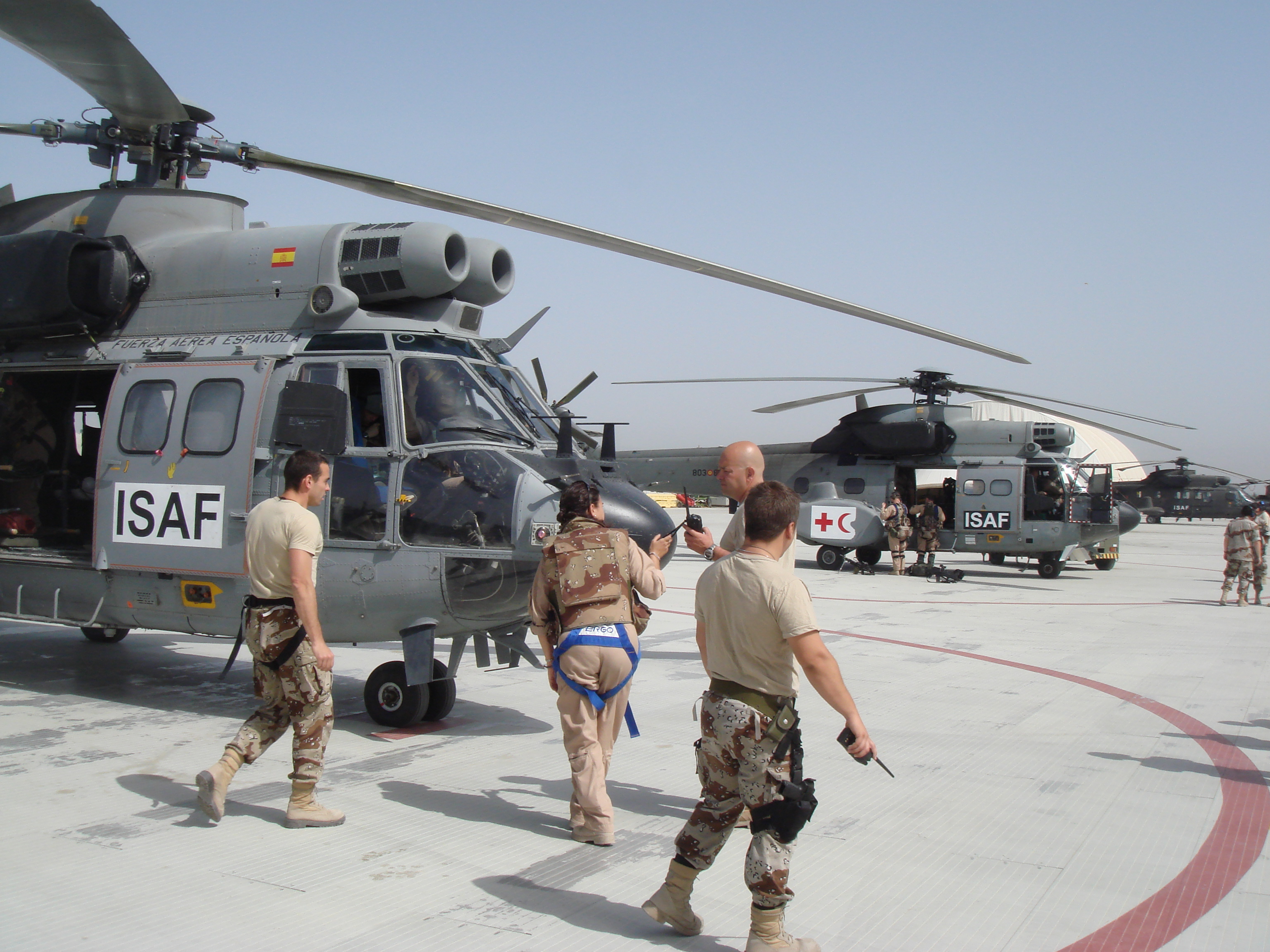
Two Spanish Super Puma helicopters like the one that crashed

The plot dramatises a real August 2012 incident in Afghanistan north of Bala Murghab involving the rescue of a Spanish Army's wrecked Super Puma helicopter from the Taliban insurgency.

== Cast ==
- Ariadna Gil as Capitán Varela
- Raúl Mérida as Teniente Conte
- Roberto Álamo as Capitán Torres
- Antonio Garrido as Comandante Ledesma
- Ingrid García Jonsson as Cabo Sánchez
- Jacobo Dicenta as Sargento Aguilar
- Ismael Martínez
- Nasser Saleh
- Mariam Hernández as Sargento Castro
- Berta Hernández
- David de la Torre
- Ruth Gabriel

== Production ==
Rescue Under Fire was produced by Tornasol Films, Castafiore Films, Hernández y Fernández and Rescate AIE, and it had the participation of RTVE and Movistar+, support from the Spanish Ministry of Defence and Armed Forces, collaboration of ICAA and funding from ICO. It had a €5 million budget. It was shot in locations of the province of Almería (including the Tabernas Desert and the "Álvarez de Sotomayor" Military Base in Viator), the Madrid region (Colmenar Viejo) as well as in Tenerife (primarily indoor footage).

== Release ==
Distributed by eOne Films, the film was theatrically released in Spain on 10 March 2017.

== Reception ==
Andrea G. Bermejo of Cinemanía rated the film 3 1/2 out of 5 stars, considering the (military) film to be an oddity in a Spanish cinema currently ranging from the thriller to the comedy, also writing that the film manages to achieve "an accurate portrait of the military world that some will surely label as propagandistic and recruiting".

Marta Medina of El Confidencial assessed that Martínez "manages to choreograph and plan credible and exciting battles of a scale rarely seen in a Spanish production".

Raquel Hernández Luján of HobbyConsolas scored a 78 out of 100 points rating ("good"), praising the production design, the frenetic pace and the soundness of the characters.

== Accolades ==
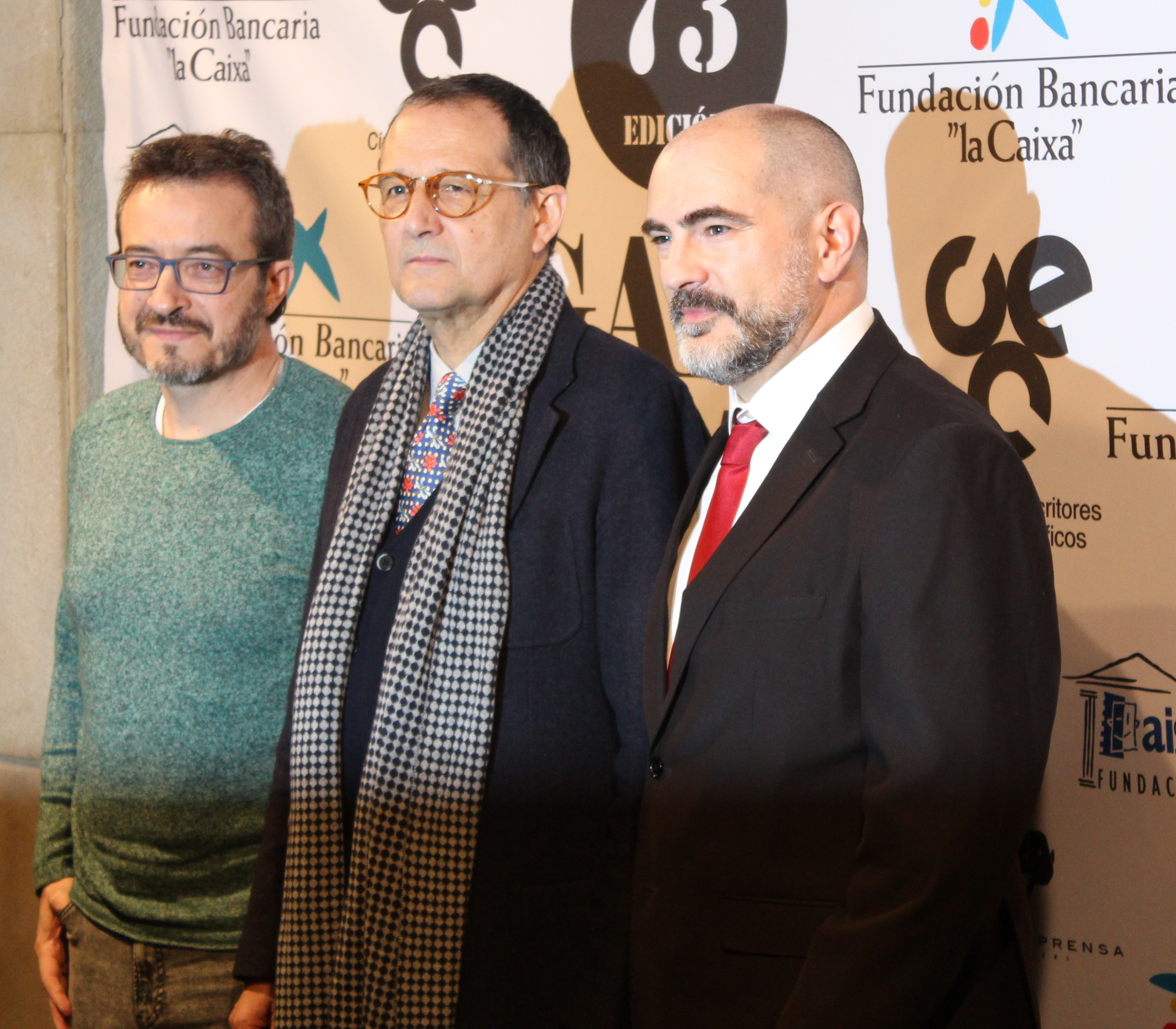
Roque Baños (composer), Javier López Blanco (producer) and Adolfo Martínez (director) attending the 73rd CEC Medals in Madrid (January 2018)

Year	Award	Category	Nominee(s)	Result	Ref.
2018	73rd CEC Medals	Best New Director	Adolfo Martínez	Nominated	
2018	73rd CEC Medals	Best Music	Roque Baños	Nominated	
2018	32nd Goya Awards	Best Original Song	"Rap Zona Hostil" by Fenyxxx and Roque Baños	Nominated	
2018	32nd Goya Awards	Best Special Effects	Reyes Abades, Curro Muñoz	Nominated	

== See also ==
- List of Spanish films of 2017
