= Jean-Claude Larrieu (cinematographer) =

French cinematographer (born 1943)

- Born: 20 September 1943 (age 81); Montastruc, Hautes-Pyrénées, France
- Occupation: Cinematographer
- Years active: 1982–present

Jean-Claude Larrieu (French pronunciation: [ʒɑ̃ klod laʁjø]; 20 September 1943) is a French cinematographer.

He has collaborated with the Spanish director Isabel Coixet on numerous occasions.

== Filmography ==
- Le Crime d'amour (1982) - Guy Gilles
- Un amour à Paris (1988) - Merzak Allouache
- Bille en tête (1989) - Carlo Cotti
- J'aurais jamais dû croiser son regard (1989) - Jean-Marc Longval
- Mauvaise fille (1991) - Régis Franc
- Coming to Terms with the Dead (1994) - Pascale Ferran
- Le Garçu (1995) - Maurice Pialat
- Restons groupés (1998) - Jean-Paul Salomé
- Le Bleu des villes (1999) - Stéphane Brizé
- My Life Without Me (2003) - Isabel Coixet
- Le Ventre de Juliette (2003) - Martin Provost
- Viva Laldjérie (2003) - Nadir Moknèche
- Habana Blues (2005) - Benito Zambrano
- Paris, je t'aime - segment Bastille (2006) - Isabel Coixet
- The Secret Life of Words (2006) - Isabel Coixet
- Comme les autres (2008) - Vincent Garenq
- Elegy (2008) - Isabel Coixet
- Queen to Play (2009) - Caroline Bottaro
- Map of the Sounds of Tokyo (2009) - Isabel Coixet
- The Women on the 6th Floor (2011) - Philippe Le Guay
- Bicycling with Molière (2013) - Philippe Le Guay
- Another Me (2013) - Isabel Coixet
- Floride (2015) - Philippe Le Guay
- Nobody Wants the Night (2015) - Isabel Coixet
- Julieta (2016) - Pedro Almodóvar
- The Bookshop (2017) - Isabel Coixet
- It Snows in Benidorm (2020) - Isabel Coixet

== Distinctions ==
- 2004 Círculo de Escritores Cinematográficos (Spanish film writers circle) awards: Best Cinematography nomination for My Life Without Me
- 2006 Círculo de Escritores Cinematográficos awards: Best Cinematography prize for The Secret Life of Words
- 2015 Goya Award for Best Cinematography: nomination for Nobody Wants the Night.
