= Giant (2017 film) =

- Spanish release poster
- Basque: Handia
- Directed by: Aitor Arregi Galdos; Jon Garaño
- Written by: Andoni De Carlos; José Mari Goenaga; Aitor Arregi; Jon Garaño
- Produced by: Xabier Berzosa; Iñaki Gómez; Iñigo Obeso
- Starring: Joseba Usabiaga; Eneko Sagardoy; Iñigo Aranburu; Ramón Agirre; Aia Kruse
- Cinematography: Javier Agirre Erauso
- Edited by: Laurent Dufreche; Raúl López
- Music by: Pascal Gaigne
- Production companies: Irusoin; Kowalski Films; Moriarti Produkzioak; EITB; TVE
- Release dates: 23 September 2017 (San Sebastián); 20 October 2017 (Spain)
- Running time: 114 minutes
- Country: Spain
- Languages: Basque (some dialogue in Spanish, French, English, Arabic and Portuguese)
- Box office: $912,912

Giant (Basque: Handia) is a 2017 Basque-language drama film directed by Aitor Arregi and Jon Garaño. The film is based on the life of Miguel Joaquín Eleicegui (1818–1861) who suffered from gigantism and was known as the "Giant from Altzo". The film premiered at the 2017 San Sebastián International Film Festival, where it was awarded the Special Jury Prize. The film was also screened at the 2017 BFI London Film Festival.

At the 32nd Goya Awards, the film won ten awards, including Best Original Screenplay, Best New Actor (Eneko Sagardoy), and Best Original Score (Pascal Gaigne).

== Plot ==
Martin Eleizegi is an unwilling conscript in the First Carlist War. While fighting, he is injured and loses the use of his right arm. He returns to his family's small farm in the village of Altzo in the Basque Country, where he discovers his younger brother, Joaquin, has grown into a giant. Martin, longing to migrate to America, sees the financial opportunity in marketing the "tallest man on Earth." The brothers travel around Europe, despite Joaquin's increasing discomfort of being a freak show. Joaquin measures himself each night and is horrified that he continues to grow well into his twenties, and suffers from increasing aches and pains. He suspects that his condition is terminal.

Martin attempts to appear more sophisticated by learning Spanish and wearing modern fashions. He briefly believes he blends in, yet his background and Basque accent betray him. Embittered, he and Joaquin travel abroad through Spain, France and England. The brothers eventually visit Stonehenge where, in a surreal, early morning ritual, Joaquin is introduced to two other giants: Saad and Esther.

In Paris, Joaquin's pain intensifies. He is taken to a doctor, who formally diagnoses Joaquin with gigantism. The doctor asks if Joaquin would sell his bones to science after he passes away. Joaquin replies that he wants to be buried in Altzo.

Joaquin and Esther meet up for a romantic encounter. She shows interest, but he is too self-conscious and possibly impotent due to his condition. Their night ends with Esther upset and confused as Joaquin angrily sends her away.

When the brothers briefly return home, Martin marries Maria, whom Joaquin courted before he grew to an unusual height. Martin and Joaquin continue to tour, with the intention of using Joaquin's wages to secure ownership of the family farm. Joaquin, suspicious of being exploited, secretly hoards the money. When their carriage is robbed by highwaymen, all of Joaquin's money is stolen. To prevent losing the farm, Martin gives up his own earnings, which he had planned to use to move to America.

In an attempt to recoup their losses, the brothers continue to tour. However, Joaquin's physical health deteriorates and their audiences dwindle. One day, Joaquin is chased into the woods by a wolf and nearly freezes to death. When the brothers reunite, Martin recognizes Joaquin's undying loyalty and they return home for good.

Joaquin dies from his medical condition and is buried in Altzo. He leaves a surprising amount of money to Martin, though the source of it is unclear. Years later, after Martin's father dies, he digs up Joaquin's grave to make room in the family cemetery. He discovers the grave is empty and realizes the money likely came from the selling of Joaquin's bones. Martin reflects on how all physical traces of Joaquin are slowly disappearing, but that he will not forget his brother.

== Cast ==
- Joseba Usabiaga as Martin
- Eneko Sagardoy as Joaquin
- Iñigo Aranburu as Arzadun
- Ramón Agirre Lasarte as Antonio
- Aia Kruse as María

== Reception ==
=== Critical response ===
The film won several Goya awards in Spain and has been described as the most technically accomplished to date Basque-language movie. English language critics have been equally enthusiastic, praising especially its visual brilliance while noting that the plot loses momentum towards the end.

On review aggregator Rotten Tomatoes, the film holds an approval rating of 78% based on 9 reviews, with an average rating of 6.8/10.

=== Awards and nominations ===
Awards	Date of ceremony	Category	Nominees	Result	Ref.
65th San Sebastián International Film Festival	September 30, 2017	Golden Shell for Best Film		Nominated	
65th San Sebastián International Film Festival	September 30, 2017	Special Jury Prize		Won	
V Premios Feroz	January 22, 2018	Best Drama Film		Nominated	
V Premios Feroz	January 22, 2018	Best Director	Aitor Arregi; Jon Garaño	Nominated	
V Premios Feroz	January 22, 2018	Best Original Soundtrack	Pascal Gaigne	Won	
V Premios Feroz	January 22, 2018	Best Film Poster	Iñaki Villuendas	Won	
32nd Goya Awards	February 3, 2018	Best Film		Nominated	
32nd Goya Awards	February 3, 2018	Best Director	Aitor Arregi; Jon Garaño	Nominated	
32nd Goya Awards	February 3, 2018	Best New Actor	Eneko Sagardoy	Won	
32nd Goya Awards	February 3, 2018	Best Original Screenplay	Jon Garaño; José María Goenaga; Aitor Arregi	Won	
32nd Goya Awards	February 3, 2018	Best Production Supervision	Ander Sistiaga	Won	
32nd Goya Awards	February 3, 2018	Best Editing	Laurent Dufreche; Raúl López	Won	
32nd Goya Awards	February 3, 2018	Best Original Score	Pascal Gaigne	Won	
32nd Goya Awards	February 3, 2018	Best Cinematography	Javier Aguirre Erauso	Won	
32nd Goya Awards	February 3, 2018	Best Art Direction	Mikel Serrano	Won	
32nd Goya Awards	February 3, 2018	Best Costume Design	Saioa Lara	Won	
32nd Goya Awards	February 3, 2018	Best Makeup and Hairstyles	Ainhoa Eskisabel; Olga Cruz; Gorka Aguirre	Won	
32nd Goya Awards	February 3, 2018	Best Sound	Iñaki Díez; Xanti Salvador	Nominated	
32nd Goya Awards	February 3, 2018	Best Special Effects	Jon Serrano; David Heras	Won	

== Addendum ==
Though it had been long believed that the body of Miguel Joaquín Eleicegui had been sold or stolen, the mystery was solved three years after the movie was released when a team from the Sociedad de Ciencias Aranzadi exhumed his bones in the local Altzo cemetery.
