= The Bookshop (film) =

2017 film by Isabel Coixet

- UK release poster
- Directed by: Isabel Coixet
- Written by: Isabel Coixet
- Based on: The Bookshop by Penelope Fitzgerald
- Produced by: Jaume Banacolocha; Joan Bas; Adolfo Blanco; Chris Curling
- Starring: Emily Mortimer; Patricia Clarkson; Bill Nighy
- Narrated by: Julie Christie
- Cinematography: Jean-Claude Larrieu
- Edited by: Bernat Aragones
- Music by: Alfonso Vilallonga
- Production companies: Diagonal Televisió; Inferno Pictures; A Contracorriente Films; Zephyr Films; One Two Films
- Distributed by: Capelight Pictures (Germany); A Contracorriente Films (Spain); Vertigo Films (United Kingdom)
- Release dates: 21 October 2017 (Valladolid); 10 November 2017 (Spain); 18 May 2018 (Germany); 29 June 2018 (United Kingdom)
- Running time: 113 minutes
- Countries: Germany; Spain; United Kingdom
- Language: English
- Budget: $3.4 million
- Box office: $9.7 million

The Bookshop is a 2017 drama film written and directed by Isabel Coixet, based on the 1978 novel of the same name by Penelope Fitzgerald, in which the lead character attempts against opposition to open a bookshop in the coastal town of Hardborough, Suffolk (a thinly-disguised version of Southwold). Shooting took place in Portaferry and Strangford, County Down, Northern Ireland and in Barcelona during August and September 2016.

The film stars Emily Mortimer, Patricia Clarkson and Bill Nighy. It won three Goya Awards, including Best Film, Best Director, and Best Adapted Screenplay.

== Plot ==
Set in the late 1950s, the film opens with an explanatory voice-over narration. Florence Green has decided to open a bookshop in the small coastal town of Hardborough, Suffolk, where she has lived for years as a war widow. She acquires as her premises the Old House, a damp and abandoned property that has been standing empty for many years.

As Florence is securing a loan from Mr Keble at the bank to open the shop, she is warned that others may have different ideas for the space. She cannot imagine that to be true, as it has been neglected for so long. News of Florence's intentions spread quickly through the small town, and several residents are quick to point out the difficulties Florence may face in opening a shop.

After refurbishing the building and moving in, Florence is invited to a social gathering at the home of Violet Gamart, an influential and ambitious local resident who had privately earmarked the Old House for her own pet project, a local arts centre. Violet makes it clear that it is a project that she has no intention of dropping, in spite of fact that the property is no longer empty.

Aided by several of the townspeople, Mrs Gamart attempts to get Florence evicted, and her shop closed. Rumours spread that Florence has changed her mind and is looking for new premises. When Florence asks Milo North, a local celebrity whom she had met at the party, whether Violet had recruited him for her arts centre project, his response is cagey. Florence's solicitor also talks of the rumours, and supplies her with a list of alternative sites. She rips up the list.

Local fisherman Mr Raven sends along a Sea Scout troop to help install bookshelves. He suggests to Florence that, if the business does well enough for her to need help, she should consider employing Christine, the young daughter of a neighbour. Christine proves very effective, even though she says she does not much like reading.

Florence's best customer is the wealthy bookish recluse Edmund Brundish, who begins to have feelings for Florence as she introduces him to new authors, including Ray Bradbury. Learning of the threats to Florence's business, he emerges from his seclusion, visits Mrs Gamart, and adamantly tells her to desist. The effort involved in doing so is too much for him, and he collapses and dies.

Mrs Gamart's nephew, a member of Parliament, sponsors a bill that empowers local councils to buy any historic building that has been left unused for five years. The bill is passed, the Old House is compulsorily purchased, and Florence is evicted without compensation. Defeated, she departs from the town by ferry, and is waved off from the quayside by Christine. As the boat draws away, she realises that Christine has set the Old House alight with a paraffin heater.

The scene switches to the present day and it becomes clear that the voice-over narrator is the adult Christine, who now runs her own bookshop.

== Cast ==
- Emily Mortimer as Florence Green
- Bill Nighy as Edmund Brundish
- Patricia Clarkson as Violet Gamart
- James Lance as Milo North
- Honor Kneafsey as Christine Gipping
- Frances Barber as Jessie Welford
- Jorge Suquet as Mr Thornton
- Charlotte Vega as Kattie
- Julie Christie as the narrator

== Release ==
The Bookshop premiered at the inauguration gala of the 2017 edition of SEMINCI, Valladolid, with excellent reviews. The Spanish release took place on 10 November, with unanimous positive reviews and grossed close to US$3.5 million during its run of more than fifteen weeks in Spanish theatres.

On 18 December 2017 Variety announced a Berlinale Special Gala with The Bookshop in February 2018, during the 68th Berlin International Film Festival.

== Reception ==
=== Critical reception ===
On review aggregator website Rotten Tomatoes, the film holds an approval rating of 58% based on 112 reviews, and an average rating of 5.5/10. The website's critical consensus reads: "A rare adaptation that sticks too closely to its source material, The Bookshop's meticulously crafted world building gets lost in its meandering pace". On Metacritic, the film has a weighted average score of 62 out of 100, based on 22 critics, indicating "generally favorable reviews".

Guy Lodge of Variety criticized various aspects of the film's production. Lodge claimed that Jean-Claude Larrieu's cinematography was inconsistent and hard-to-pin down "alternating between pastoral naturalism and ominously theatrical exterior lighting," Lodge called the supporting actors contributions "wildly uneven" in quality, and Alfonso de Vilallonga's score as heavy-handed. Lodge concluded that "The Bookshop perhaps makes the case for printed matter in more ways than it intends." Nell Minow of RogerEbert.com similarly gave a reserved evaluation of the film, giving it a modest two out of four stars, claiming: "Having the right ingredients does not always make a good cake...Movies, like reading, should expand our ability to understand, and this one does not even understand itself."

=== Awards and nominations ===
Isabel Coixet's screenplay won the Frankfurt Book Fair prize for Best International Literary Adaptation 2017.

On 13 December 2017, The Bookshop received 12 nominations for the XXXIIIrd edition of the Goya Awards, by the Spanish Cinema Academy. On 3 February 2018, it won three major Goya Awards: Best Film, Best Director, and Best Adapted Screenplay.

On 28 December 2017, the film won 12 nominations for the Xth edition of the Gaudí Awards, including Best Non-Catalan Speaking Film, Best Direction, and Best Screenplay. On 28 January 2018, it won two Gaudí Awards for Best Artistic Direction and Best Original Score.

On 13 March 2018, the film won 4 nominations for the 5th edition of the Platino Awards including Best Film, Best Direction, Best Screenplay, and Best Original Music.

| Awards | Category | Nominated | Result | Ref. |
|---|---|---|---|---|
| 32nd Goya Awards (3 February 2018) | Best Film | | Won | |
| 32nd Goya Awards (3 February 2018) | Best Director | Isabel Coixet | Won | |
| 32nd Goya Awards (3 February 2018) | Best Adapted Screenplay | Isabel Coixet | Won | |
| 32nd Goya Awards (3 February 2018) | Best Actress | Emily Mortimer | Nominated | |
| 32nd Goya Awards (3 February 2018) | Best Supporting Actor | Bill Nighy | Nominated | |
| 32nd Goya Awards (3 February 2018) | Best Cinematography | Jean-Claude Larrieu | Nominated | |
| 32nd Goya Awards (3 February 2018) | Best Edition | Bernat Aragonés | Nominated | |
| 32nd Goya Awards (3 February 2018) | Best Art Direction | Llorenç Miquel and Marc Pou | Nominated | |
| 32nd Goya Awards (3 February 2018) | Best Production Supervision | Jordi Berenguer and Alex Boyd | Nominated | |
| 32nd Goya Awards (3 February 2018) | Best Original Score | Alfonso de Vilallonga | Nominated | |
| 32nd Goya Awards (3 February 2018) | Best Original Song | "Feeling Loney on a Sunday Afternoon" | Nominated | |
| 32nd Goya Awards (3 February 2018) | Best Costume Design | Mercè Paloma | Nominated | |
