= Eneko Sagardoy =

Basque actor

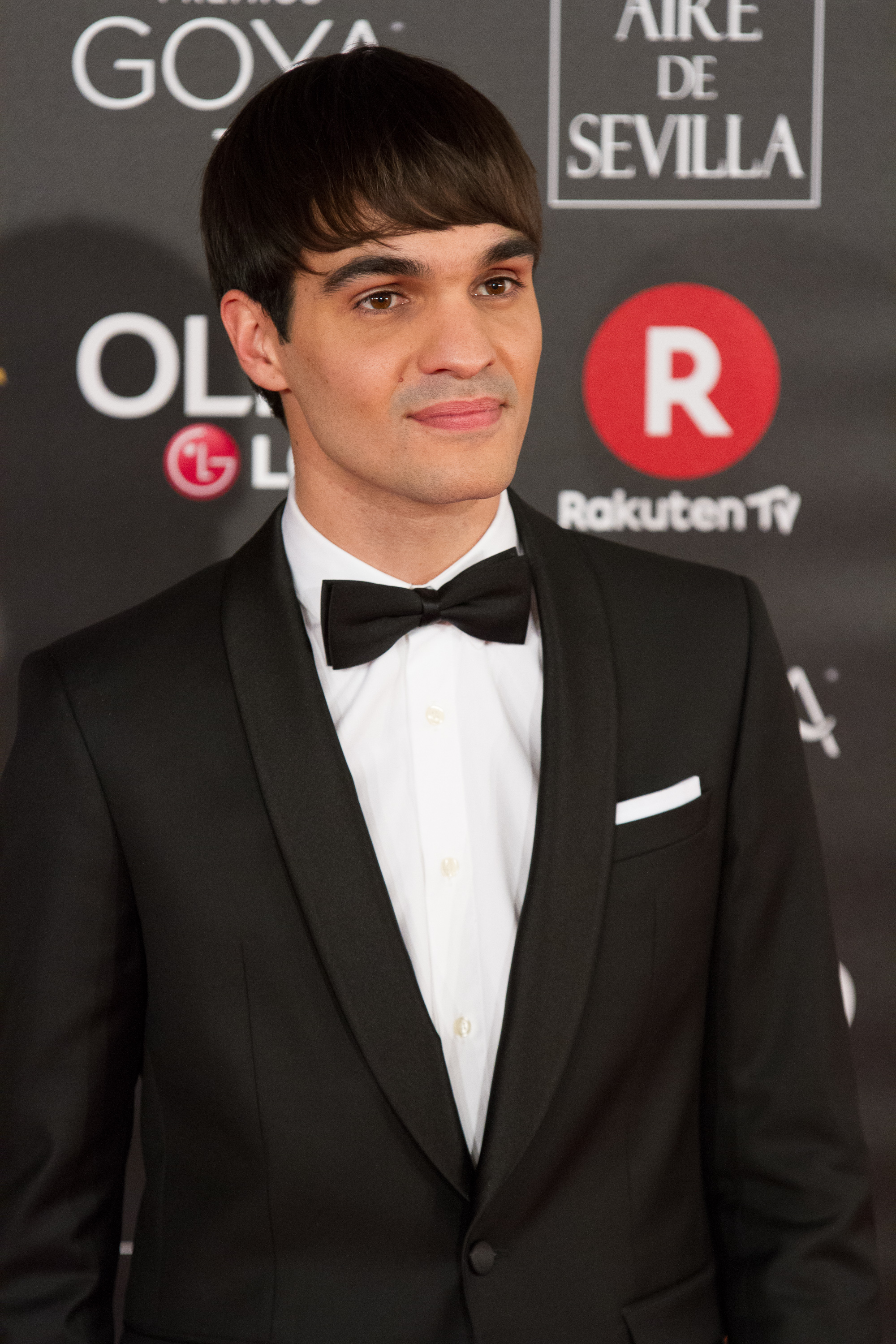
- At the 32nd Goya Awards in 2018
- Born: Eneko Sagardoy Mujika; 17 January 1994 (age 31); Durango, Basque Country, Spain
- Occupation: Actor

Eneko Sagardoy Mujika (born 17 January 1994) is a Basque Spanish actor who became known for his performances in Basque language works.

== Biography ==
Eneko Sagardoy Mujika was born in Durango, Biscay, on 17 January 1994.

After his beginnings in performing arts taking part in his school's stage plays, he joined the cast of Basque soap opera Goenkale at age 18. He studied a degree in audiovisual communication at Mondragon University. His performance as a 2.42-metre-tall (7 ft 11 in) freak show attraction (he actually stands at just 1.84 m) in Giant earned him the Goya Award for Best New Actor in 2018.

He has also featured in films such as Errementari (2017), La higuera de los bastardos (2017), Cuando dejes de quererme (2018), Soinujolearen semea/El hijo del acordeonista (2018), Hil Kanpaiak/Campanadas a muerto (2020), Mía y Moi (2021), Counting Sheep (2022), Irati and television series such as Hondar ahoak (2020) and Patria (2020).

== Accolades ==
Year	Award	Category	Work	Result	Ref.
2018	32nd Goya Awards	Best New Actor	Giant	Won	
2018	27th Actors and Actresses Union Awards	Best New Actor	Giant	Won	
2021	8th Feroz Awards	Best Supporting Actor in a TV Series	Patria	Nominated	
