= Isabel Coixet =

Spanish film director (born 1960)

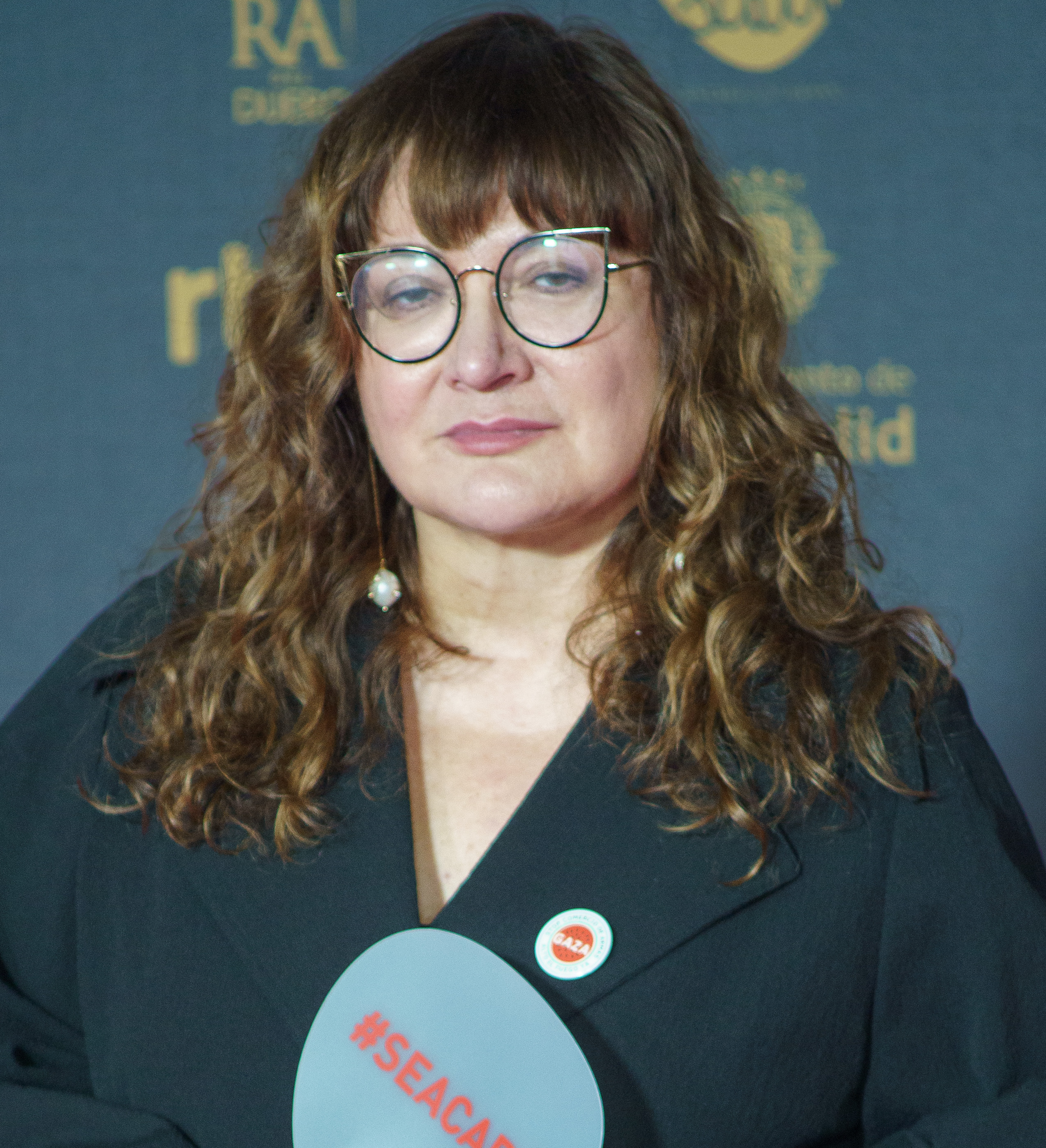
- Coixet in 2024
- Born: Isabel Coixet Castillo; 9 April 1960 (age 66); Barcelona, Spain
- Education: University of Barcelona
- Occupation: Film director
- Years active: 1989–present
- Known for: My Life Without Me; The Secret Life of Words
- Spouse: Reed Brody
- Children: 1
- Website: http://misswasabi.com

Isabel Coixet Castillo (Catalan: [izəˈβɛl kuˈʃɛt]; born 9 April 1960) is a Spanish film director. She is one of the most prolific film directors of contemporary Spain, having directed twelve feature-length films since the beginning of her film career in 1988, in addition to documentary films, shorts, and commercials. Her films depart from the traditional national cinema of Spain, and help to “untangle films from their national context ... clearing the path for thinking about national film from different perspectives.” The recurring themes of “emotions, feelings, and existential conflict” coupled with her distinct visual style secure the “multifaceted (she directs, writes, produces, shoots, and acts)” filmmaker's status as a “Catalan auteur.”

== Early life ==
Isabel Coixet was born in Sant Adrià del Besòs near Barcelona on 9 April 1960. She started filming when she was given an 8 mm camera on the occasion of her First Communion. After obtaining a BA degree in history at Barcelona University, where she majored in eighteenth- and nineteenth-century history, she worked in advertising and spot writing for the cinema magazine Fotogramas. She continued in the world of advertising, standing out as creative director of the agency JWT.

== Career ==
Coixet made her first short film in 1984, Mira y verás. In 1988, Coixet made her debut as a scriptwriter and director in Demasiado Viejo Para Morir Joven (Too Old to Die Young). For this movie, she was nominated at the Goya Awards as a Best New Director. In 1996, she traveled to the United States to shoot her first English-language feature film, entitled Things I Never Told You (Cosas que nunca te dije). This drama cast American actors led by Lili Taylor and Andrew McCarthy. Coixet received her second nomination at the Goya Awards for Best Original Screenplay. Coixet then connected with a French production company, and in 1998 she shot — for the first time in Spain and in Spanish — the historical adventure A los que aman. Two years later she founded her own production company, with which she produced her most acclaimed film to date, Mi vida sin mí (My Life Without Me). Since then she has been one of the most acclaimed directors of Spanish cinema.

In 2000, she founded her own production company called Miss Wasabi Films, for which she has produced over 400 commercials. Her international success came in 2003 thanks to the intimate drama My Life Without Me. The film was based on a short story by Nancy Kincaid. Canadian actress Sarah Polley played Ann, a young mother who decides to hide from her family that she has terminal cancer. This Hispanic-Canadian co-production was highly praised at the Berlin International Film Festival. Coixet then continued working with Polley as her lead actress with the film The Secret Life of Words, which was released in 2005 and also starred Tim Robbins and Javier Cámara. The film was awarded four Goyas: Best Film, Best Director, Best Production and Best Screenplay.

In 2005, Coixet joined eighteen other international filmmakers, among them Gus Van Sant, Walter Salles and Joel and Ethan Coen, to make the groundbreaking collective project Paris, je t’aime, in which each director explored a different Paris quarter. Coixet made prominent documentaries on major themes, such as Invisibles, which was selected for the "Panorama" section of the 2007 Berlin Film Festival, about the international medical organization Doctors Without Borders. Also the documentary Journey to the Heart of Torture, which was filmed in Sarajevo during the Balkan War and won an award at the October 2003 Human Rights Film Festival.

In April 2006, she was honored with the Creu de San Jordi De Cine Awards by the Generalitat de Catalunya. The Barcelona director received not one but two awards. In addition to the critical award for The Secret Life of Words (La vida secreta de las palabras) as the best Spanish film, she also received the Rosa de Sant Jordi prize, voted by the audience of Radio Nacional de España (RNE), for the best production. The award ceremony was held at the Palau de la Música.

In 2008, Coixet released Elegy, which was filmed in Vancouver and produced by Lakeshore Entertainment. The film was based on Philip Roth's novel The Dying Animal, was written for the screen by Nicholas Meyer, and starred Penélope Cruz and Ben Kingsley. Elegy was presented at the 58th Berlin International Film Festival.

In 2009, as an official selection of the Cannes Film Festival, she premiered the film Map of the Sounds of Tokyo, shot in both Japan and Barcelona and starring Rinko Kikuchi, Sergi López and Min Tanaka, with a script by Coixet herself. And at the Centre D'Art Santa Mònica, she inaugurated From I to J, an installation in honor of the work of John Berger. That same year she received the gold medal for Fine Arts and was also part of the jury of the 59th edition of the Berlin Film Festival.

In April 2009 at the Centre d'Arts Santa Mónica in Barcelona and in April 2010 at La Casa Encendida in Madrid, Coixet presented a monographic exhibition dedicated to the British writer, art critic, poet and artist John Berger entitled From I to J. A tribute by Isabel Coixet to John Berger, with the collaboration of the architect Benedetta Tagliabue and the participation of the actresses Penélope Cruz, Monica Bellucci, Isabelle Huppert, Maria de Medeiros, Sarah Polley, Tilda Swinton and Leonor Watling.

Also in 2009 she directed a short documentary called La mujer es cosa de hombres about male violence and the media. for a project entitled "50 years of..." about the history of Catalonia.

In 2010, she took on responsibility for the content of one of the three Spanish Pavilion lounges for the Expo Shanghai. Plus, she inaugurated the exhibition Aral. The Lost Sea, which shows her documentary with the same title, shot in Uzbekistan in 2009.

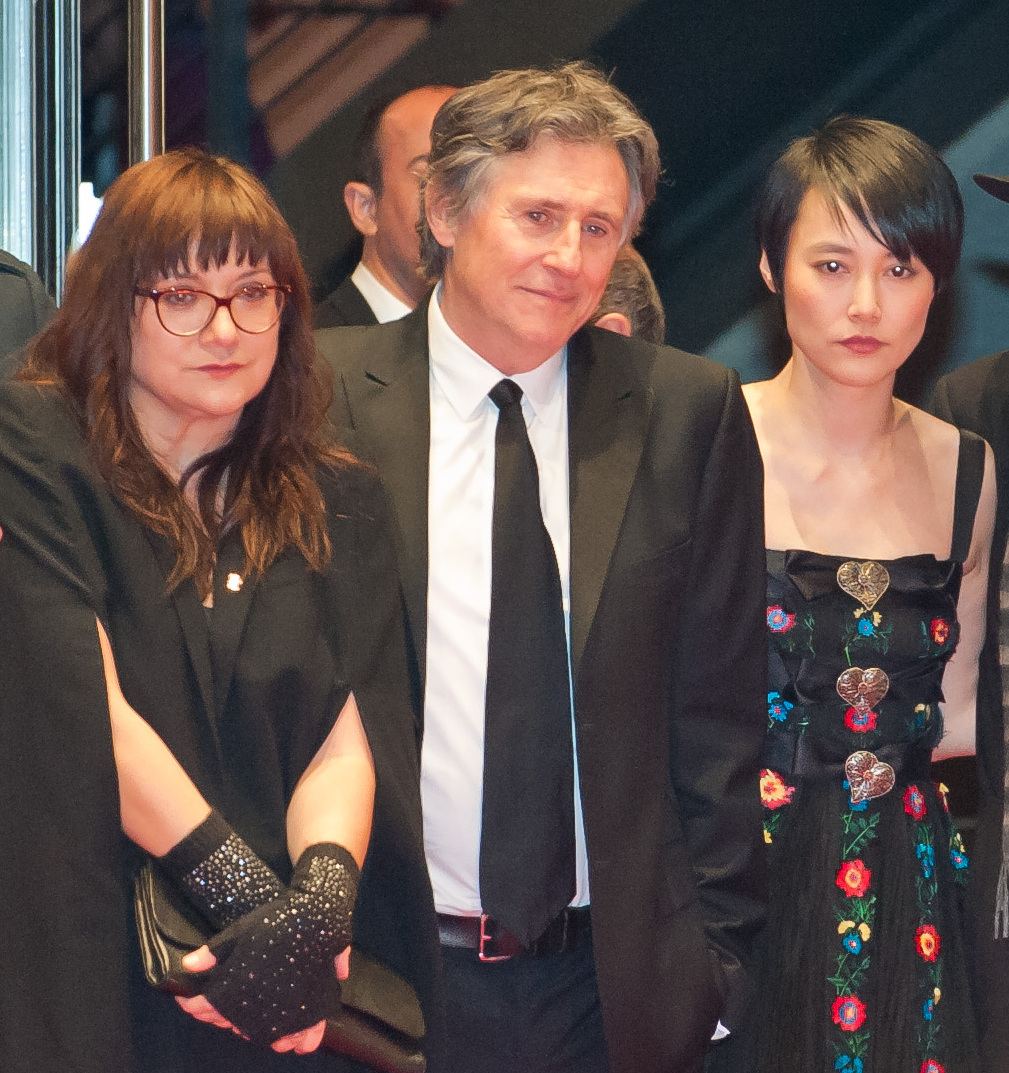
Cast of Nobody Wants the Night - Isabel Coixet (director), Gabriel Byrne, Rinko Kikuchi at 65th BIFF 2015

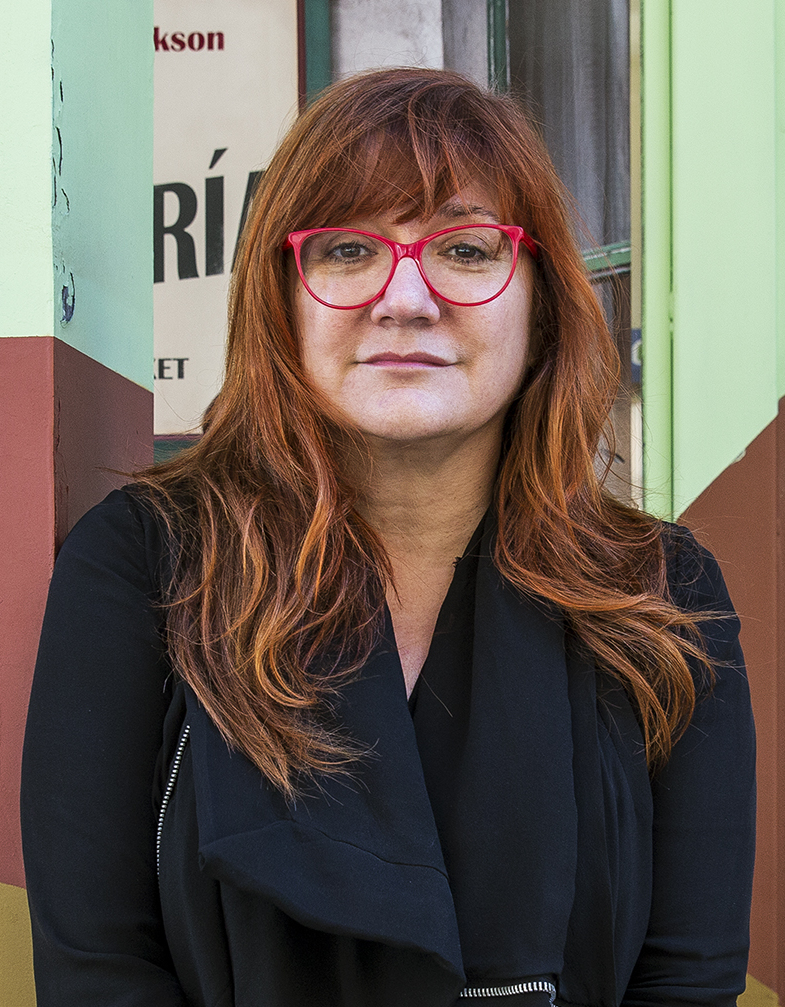
Coixet in 2017

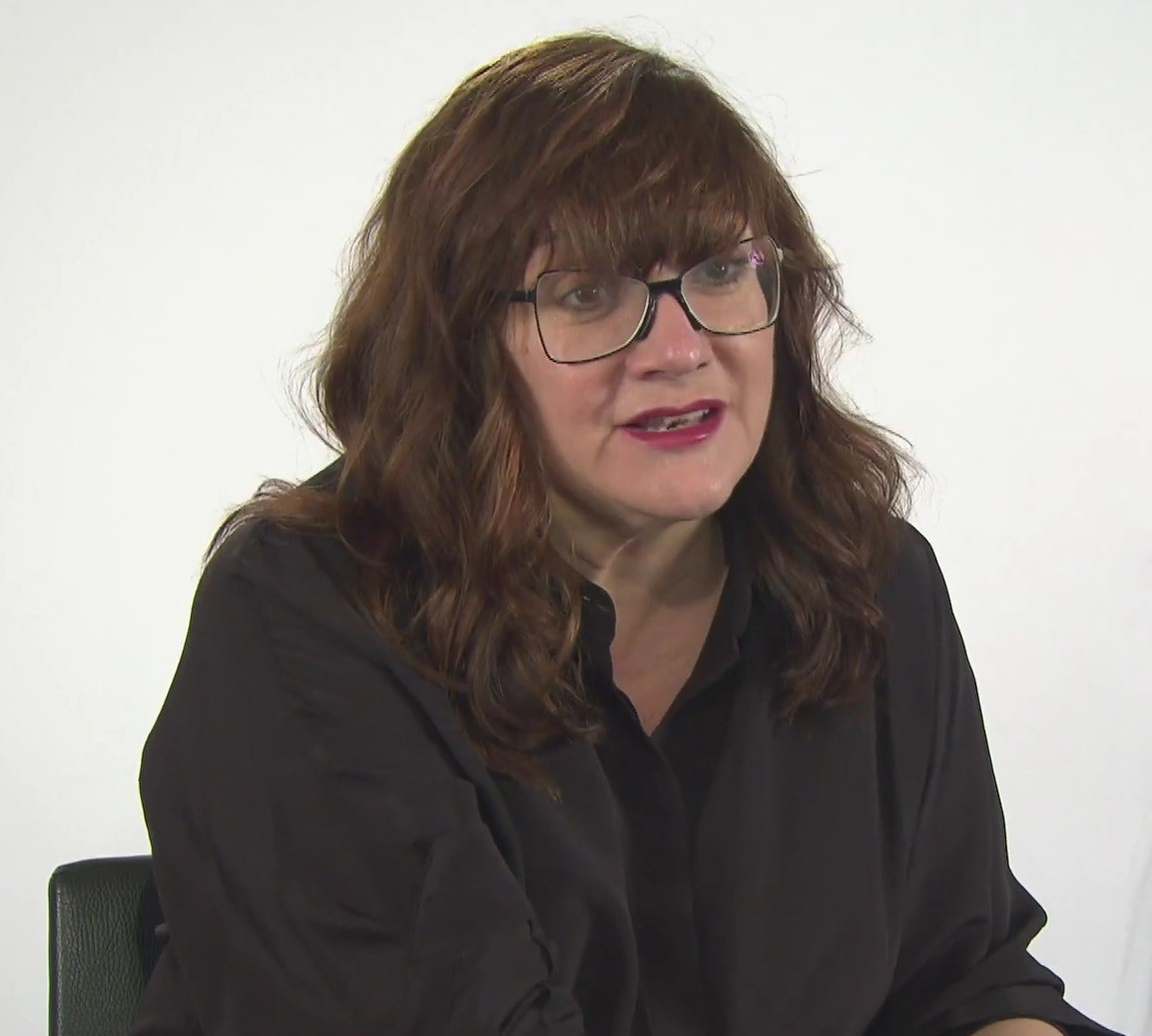
Coixet in 2019

In 2011, within the "Berlinale Specials" section of the Berlin Film Festival, she premiered the documentary Listening to Judge Garzón giving voice to the Spanish magistrate through an interview with writer Manuel Rivas. The film won the Goya in the Best Documentary category. During 2012, she directed a documentary about the 10 years of the Prestige disaster and the volunteers who participated in the recovery of the Galician coasts under the title White Tide.

That same year, Coixet shot and produced Ayer no termina nunca (Yesterday Never Ends) which premiered in the Panorama Section of the 63rd edition of the International Film Festival of Berlin. The film also opened the Málaga Film Festival the same year, where it won four Silver Biznagas in the categories Special Jury Prize, Best Actress, Best Photography and Best Editing, the last two prizes won by Jordi Azategui. In the end of 2012 she also started shooting a new project, which she finished in 2013, called Another Me, an English-language thriller written and directed by Coixet with a cast that featured Sophie Turner, Rhys Ifans, Jonathan Rhys-Meyers and Geraldine Chaplin, among others.

In the summer of 2013 she started shooting Learning to Drive, an American production developed in New York City, based on an article published in The New York Times and starring Sir Ben Kingsley and Patricia Clarkson, with whom Isabel Coixet had already worked in Elegy. It premiered at the Toronto International Film Festival and won the Grolsch People's Choice Award.

Nobody Wants the Night was her next project, filmed in Norway, Bulgaria and the Canary Islands. The film starred Juliette Binoche, Rinko Kikuchi and Gabriel Byrne. The film opened the 66th Berlin International Film Festival to competition.

Coixet is always interested in shooting documentaries to denounce what she doesn't agree with, or to give voice to her protagonists. She shot a documentary in Chad at the end of 2014 narrated by Juliette Binoche entitled Talking about Rose: Prisoner of Hissène Habré. The piece relates the experience of a group of torture victims in their struggle to bring the former Chadian dictator to justice, an effort led by US human rights lawyer Reed Brody.

During the 2015 edition of the Málaga Festival, the prize was awarded to her entire career and it was presented a retrospective documentary of her work, commissioned by the Festival itself, Words, Maps, Secrets And Other Things, directed by Elena Trapé.

Also in 2015 she received the recognized prize of the French Ministry of Culture of Knight of Arts and Letters.

During 2015 and 2016, Coixet directed the project Spain in a Day, the Spanish version of the documentary crowdsourcing project produced by Mediapro. The project aims to portray the reality of a country reflected by hundreds of domestic videos recorded during the same day and that has had as direct precedents Britain in a Day and Italy in a Day. In the case of Spain in a Day, the videos were recorded on 24 October 2015 by thousands of volunteers.

In the summer of 2016 she directed the feature film The Bookshop (La librería). The script adapted by Coixet was based on the novel of the same name by the English writer Penelope Fitzgerald and received the prize for the best literary adaptation at the Frankfurt Book Fair in 2017. The film was shot in Northern Ireland and Barcelona, starring Emily Mortimer, Bill Nighy and Patricia Clarkson. The Bookshop inaugurated the SEMINCI 2017, as a world premiere, receiving good reviews and it was commercially released in Spain on November 10, with a very positive critical reception and great public success.

The Bookshop premiered outside of Spain at the Berlinale Special Gala at the 68th edition of the Berlin International Film Festival, which took place in February 2018.

In February 2019, Coixet released the film Elisa y Marcela in collaboration with Netflix. The film, based on the first registered same-sex marriage in Spain, was the third original Spanish film by Netflix.

On 4 September 2020, the Spanish Ministry of Culture and Sports announced that Isabel Coixet would be awarded the National Film Award 2020. The award was presented at the San Sebastian International Film Festival.

=== Productions ===
Coixet created her own production company in 2000, Miss Wasabi, with the vocation to self-produce her own more personal projects. The production company has dedicated itself basically to advertising, the making of video clips, documentaries and a fictional feature film, but also to projects outside the audiovisual sector, such as exhibitions, books and other types of cultural projects. Among the main projects, directed and produced by Isabel Coixet, are the documentary Aral, el mar perdido (2009), From I to J (2010), Escuchando al Juez Garzón (2011), the feature film Ayer no termina nunca (2013), or Talking about Rose. Prisoner of Hissène Habré (2015).

=== 50 años de... ===
On the occasion of the celebration of the 50th anniversary of TVE Catalunya (TVE Cataluña), Coixet, along with fifteen other Catalan documentary filmmakers, had the idea of capturing images, taken from the archive of Televisión Española, of the last half-century in Spain. The programme 50 years of... (50 años de…) is in honor of the fiftieth anniversary of the first TVE broadcast in Catalonia, whose first headquarters was the mythical Miramar Hotel in Barcelona, which was maintained for twenty-four years, until 1983, when the production center was moved to San Cugat del Vallés. There has been a second season, as well as a third entitled Cómo hemos cambiado.

== Personal life and political views ==
Coixet has a daughter, Zoe, born in 1997, and lives in Barcelona with her boyfriend, Reed Brody, a human rights lawyer.

In October 2012 Coixet was one of the signatories of the "Call to the federalist and left-wing Catalonia" manifesto, asking the Catalan left-wing for an unabashed federalist stance vis-à-vis the State. She openly declared her opposition to the October 2017 independence referendum held in Catalonia, signing another manifesto calling on people not to take part in the vote. In April 2020 she signed a manifesto to say "enough" to the "Catalan government's political mismanagement" and "its unsupportive and irresponsible statements" on the coronavirus crisis.

Coixet's political and feminist involvement is evident. For example, The Secret Life of Words is a film that denounces the rapes certain women suffered in the Balkan Wars.

== Pledge ==
In September 2025, she signed an open pledge with Film Workers for Palestine pledging not to work with Israeli film institutions "that are implicated in genocide and apartheid against the Palestinian people."

== Filmography ==
=== Film ===
==== Feature films ====
Year	Title	Director	Writer	Camera Operator	Notes
1983	Morbus (o bon profit)	No	Yes	No	
1989	Demasiado viejo para morir joven	Yes	Yes	No	
1996	Things I Never Told You	Yes	Yes	No	
1998	A los que aman	Yes	Yes	No	
2003	My Life Without Me	Yes	Yes	Yes	
2005	The Secret Life of Words	Yes	Yes	Yes	Also associate producer and music supervisor (credited as Miss Wassabi)
2008	Elegy	Yes	No	Yes	Also music supervisor
2009	Map of the Sounds of Tokyo	Yes	Yes	Yes	
2013	Yesterday Never Ends	Yes	Yes	No	Also executive producer
2013	Another Me	Yes	Yes	No	
2014	Learning to Drive	Yes	No	Yes	
2015	Nobody Wants the Night	Yes	No	Yes	
2017	The Bookshop	Yes	Yes	Yes	
2019	Elisa & Marcela	Yes	Yes	Yes	
2020	It Snows in Benidorm	Yes	Yes	Yes	
2023	The Movie Teller	No	Yes	No	
2023	Un amor	Yes	Yes	Yes	
2025	Three Goodbyes	Yes	Yes	No	

Producer only

- Clue (2008) (Executive Producer)
- Nobody's Watching (2017) (co-producer)
- Distances (2018) (Associate producer)

==== Short films ====
Year	Title	Director	Writer	Notes
1984	Mira y verás	Yes	Yes	Also producer
2006	Bastille	Yes	Yes	Segment for the anthology film Paris, je t'aime
2016	Un corazón roto no es como un jarrón roto o un florero	Yes	Yes	Content-branded short
2017	Proyecto Tiempo. Parte I: La llave	Yes	No	Content-branded short
2017	Proyecto Tiempo. Parte II: La Cura	Yes	No	Content-branded short
2017	Proyecto Tiempo. Parte III: El Juego	Yes	No	Content-branded short
2017	Amodio	Yes	No	Content-branded short
2018	Proyecto Tiempo. Parte IV: Brainstart	Yes	No	Content-branded short

Producer

- Meteoritos (1997)
- Jealousy (2002) (executive producer)
- Teeth (2014) (also executive producer)
- Sara a la fuga (2015)

=== Documentaries ===
==== Documentary films ====
Year	Title	Director	Writer	Producer	Notes
2003	Viaje al corazón de la tortura	Yes	Yes	No	
2011	Escuchando al Juez Garzón	Yes	No	Yes	Also editor and camera
2016	Spain in a Day	Yes	Yes	Yes	
2017	El espíritu de la pintura	Yes	Story	Yes	
2022	El techo amarillo	Yes	Yes	Executive	

Associate producer

- Hotel Explotación: Las Kelly's (2018)
- Drowning Letters (2020)

==== Documentary short films ====
Year	Title	Director	Writer	Producer	Notes
2004	La insoportable verdad del carrito de compra	Yes	No	No	Segment for the collaborative documentary film "¡Hay Motivo!"
2007	Cartas a Nora	Yes	Yes	No	Segment for the collaborative documentary film "Invisibles"
2010	Dear John	Yes	Yes	No	Also cinematographer
2010	Aral, el mar perdido	Yes	No	No	
2012	Marea Blanca	Yes	No	Yes	
2013	Venice 70: Future Reloaded	Yes	No	No	Untitled segment director
2015	Parler de Rose, prissionnière de Hissène Habrè	Yes	No	Executive	Also editor
2016	Normal	Yes	Yes	No	
2016	No es tan fría Siberbia	Yes	Yes	No	Also cinematographer

=== Television ===
Year	Title	Director	Writer	Notes
1998	XII premios Goya	Yes	Yes	TV special
2009	50 años de...	Yes	No	TV documentary series Episode: "...La mujer, cosas de hombres"
2019	Foodie Love	Yes	Yes	TV Miniseries; Also creator and executive producer 8 episodes
2021	Peace Peace Now Now	Yes	No	TV documentary Series; Episode: "Libertad Bajo Condena"
2022	Cuidarnos Entre Nosotros Nos Hace Humanos	Yes	No	TV documentary Series; 4 episodes

=== Music videos ===
Year	Title	Artist	Notes
1992	Pisando fuerte	Alejandro Sanz	
2004	It's All Right	Marlango	Co-directed with Rafa Suñado
2004	Once Upon a Time	Marlango	
2021	Forever Just Beyond	Clem Snide	

== Awards ==
Goya Awards

Year	Category	Nominated work	Result	Ref.
1989	Best New Director	Too Old To Die Young	Nominated	
1997	Best Original Screenplay	Things I Never Told You	Nominated	
2004	Best Director	My Life Without Me	Nominated	
2004	Best Adapted Screenplay	My Life Without Me	Won	
2006	Best Production Supervision	The Secret Life of Words.	Won	
2006	Best Original Screenplay	The Secret Life of Words.	Won	
2006	Best Director	The Secret Life of Words.	Won	
2006	Best Film	The Secret Life of Words.	Won	
2008	Best Documental Film (shared with other 4 directors)	Invisibles	Won	
2012	Best Documental Film	Listening to Judge Garzón	Won	
2016	Best Director	Nobody Wants the Night	Nominated	
2016	Best Film	Nobody Wants the Night	Nominated	
2017	Best Director	The Bookshop	Won	
2017	Best Adapted Screenplay	The Bookshop	Won	
2022	Best Documentary	El Sostre Groc	Nominated	

Medals of the Circle of Cinematographic Writers

Year	Category	Nominated work	Result	Ref.
1997	Best Original Screenplay	Things I Never Told You	Won	
2003	Best Adapted Screenplay	My Life Without Me	Won	
2006	Best Original Screenplay	The Secret Life of Words.	Won	
2006	Best Director	The Secret Life of Words.	Won	
2017	Best Director	The Bookshop	Won	
2017	Best Adapted Screenplay	The Bookshop	Won	

Feroz Awards

Year	Category	Nominated work	Result	Ref.
2017	Best Director	The Bookshop	Won	

Forqué Awards

Year	Category	Nominated work	Result	Ref.
2004	Best Film of the Year	My Life Without Me	Nominated	
2006	Best Film of the Year	The Secret Life of Words.	Won	
2006	Best Film of the Year	The Secret Life of Words.	Won	
2008	Special EGEDA Award for the Best Documentary Feature	Invisibles	Nominated	
2016	Best Feature	Nobody Wants the Night	Nominated	
2017	Best Director	The Bookshop	Won	

Gaudí Awards

Year	Category	Nominated work	Result	Ref.
2018	Best Director	The Bookshop	Nominated	
2018	Best Screenplay		Won	

Butaca Awards

Year	Category	Nominated work	Result	Ref.
2003	Best Catalan Film	My Life Without Me	Won	
2006	Best Catalan Film	The Secret Life of Words.	Won	

Other Awards

- National Film and Audiovisual Prize of Catalonia (2002) for the film My Life Without Me.
- Premio Creu de Sant Jordi de cine (2006).
- Ojo Crítico de Cine Award in its XIV Edition for the film, My Life Without Me, for the “sincerity and sensitivity of its cinematographic language”.
- Knight of the Order of Arts and Letters (2015) for his contribution to the world of art and culture
- Atlantida Award from the Catalan Publishers (2016)
- Award for the Best Literary Adaptation at the Frankfurt Book Fair 2017, for the adapted script of The Bookshop.
- International Award Yo Dona 2018
- Premio Nacional de Cinematografía de España 2020.

== Books ==
- My Life Without Me (Mi vida sin mí) (2003)
- La vida es un guión (2004)
- La vida secreta de las palabras (2005)
- Mapa de los sonidos de Tokio (2009)
- Isabel Muñoz (2009)
- From I to J (2009)
- Alguien debería prohibir los domingos por la tarde (2011)
- La vida secreta de Isabel Coixet (2011)

== See also ==
- List of female film and television directors
- List of LGBT-related films directed by women
