= Abracadabra (2017 film) =

2017 film

- Theatrical release poster
- Directed by: Pablo Berger
- Written by: Pablo Berger
- Starring: Maribel Verdú; Antonio de la Torre; José Mota
- Cinematography: Kiko de la Rica
- Edited by: David Gallart
- Music by: Alfonso de Vilallonga
- Production companies: Arcadia Motion Pictures; Perséfone Films; Pegaso Pictures; Noodles Production; Films Distribution; Atresmedia Cine
- Distributed by: Sony Pictures Releasing International (es); Condor Distribution (fr)
- Release dates: 4 August 2017 (Spain); 4 April 2018 (France)
- Running time: 96 minutes
- Countries: Spain; France
- Language: Spanish
- Box office: $2 million

Abracadabra is a 2017 Spanish-French fantasy black comedy-drama film written and directed by Pablo Berger. It stars Maribel Verdú, Antonio de la Torre and José Mota.

It was shortlisted as one of the three films to choose from to determine the Spanish submission for the Academy Award for Best Foreign Language Film at the 90th Academy Awards.

== Plot ==
Carmen is married to Carlos, a rude, emotionally abusive construction worker who barely pays any attention to his wife and teenage daughter. One night, during a wedding, Carlos pretends to offer himself for the act of Carmen's cousin, supermarket security guard and amateur hypnotist Pepe, but he instead crashes Pepe's performance as his idea of a joke. However, he ends up unexpectedly affected by the hypnosis, to the point of holding Pepe hostage with a knife for a moment while everybody believes he is still joking. From the next day onwards, Carlos starts having lapses of time where he shows a very different personality, behaving instead like a loving, charismatic and intelligent man. Shocked yet gradually delighted, Carmen welcomes this change, but she starts suspecting there is something sinister behind it when Carlos's second personality has brief but dangerous episodes of psychosis.

She enlists the aid of Pepe and his hypnotism teacher, odontologist Dr. Fumetti, and together discover the truth: Carlos had sleeping mediumnic abilities, and the failed hypnosis act caused a dead man's soul to forge a spiritual link with him, possessing him at times. After investigating further, Carmen and Pepe eventually find out the identity of the dead man, a dancing prodigy named Alberto "Tito" Cantero who had schizophrenia and murdered his own mother before committing suicide in 1983. This is further proved in a club, in which Carlos dances spectacularly with Carmen to Steve Miller Band's "Abracadabra" song. Carmen, Pepe and Dr. Fumetti hold a séance through the body of a dying old man to try to convince Tito to leave Carlos alone, but the spirit refuses claiming to be in love with Carmen. The latter impulsively drives Dr. Fumetti away when he tries to destroy the spirit by killing the old man, which would have killed Carlos too.

Time passes, and Carmen is left conflicted about what to do, while the Tito-possessed Carlos becomes increasingly unhinged due to his constant psychotic visions of chimpanzees tormenting him. At his new job as a steward, Tito has a breakdown, and only the arrival of Carmen and Pepe impedes him from possibly murdering an entire wedding with a knife. In order to solve the situation once for all, Pepe pretends to be an entertainer and performs a hypnotism act for the guests, which he uses to send both Tito and Carmen to the depths of Carlos's mind. Here she finds the mental representations of both men, each pleading for her to allow them to take over the body, with Carlos promising to make up for his failure as a husband and father. She faces a difficult decision, but despite seemingly accepting Tito over Carlos, she stabs Tito with the mental representation of the knife, sending his soul to the afterlife for good. After waking up, she leaves silently the restaurant, implying she has decided to abandon Carlos and seek a better life.

== Cast ==
- Maribel Verdú as Carmen
- Antonio de la Torre as Carlos
- José Mota as Pepe
- Josep Maria Pou as Doctor Fumetti
- Quim Gutiérrez as Tito
- Julián Villagrán
- Ramón Barea
- Priscilla Delgado as Toñi
- Javivi
- Saturnino García
- Janfri Topera

== Production ==
The film was produced by Arcadia Motion Pictures alongside Perséfone Films, Pegaso Pictures, Noodles Production and Films Distribution, in association with Atresmedia Cine and with the participation of Atresmedia and Movistar+.

== Release ==
Distributed by Sony Pictures, Abracadabra was released theatrically in Spain on 4 August 2017. French distribution was handled by Condor Distribution, that scheduled a 4 April 2018 theatrical release date.

== Reception ==
Abracadabra has an approval rating of 100% on review aggregator website Rotten Tomatoes, based on 6 reviews, and an average rating of 7/10.

== See also ==
- List of Spanish films of 2017
- List of French films of 2018
