= Peter Bush (translator) =

English literary translator

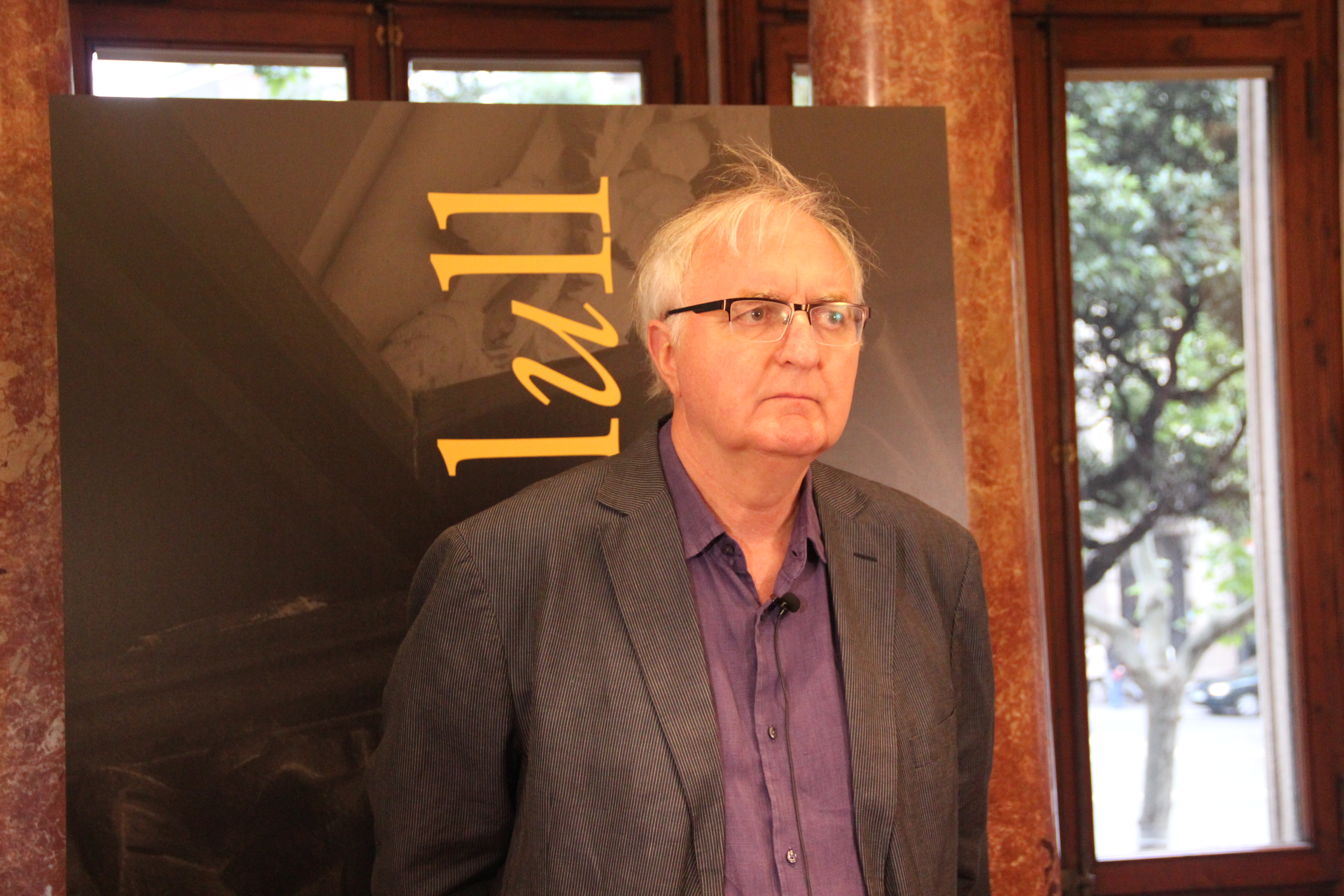
Peter Bush at Institut Ramon Llull.

Peter R. Bush (born 1946) is an English literary translator. He has translated works from Catalan, French, Spanish and Portuguese to English, including the work of Josep Pla, Joan Sales, Mercè Rodoreda, Fernando de Rojas, Juan Goytisolo and Juan Carlos Onetti.

== Life and career ==
Peter Bush was born in Spalding, Lincolnshire. His father, from a large rural working-class family, was a print worker and trade unionist; his mother grew up in an urban working-class family in Sheffield. He studied French and Spanish at Cambridge University before gaining a DPhil in Spanish history and fiction from Oxford University.

Though Bush translated various Marxist economic and political analyses between 1967 and 1972, since then he has only translated literary texts. He has spoken of the crucial importance in his life of translating Juan Goytisolo:

"I suppose my first Goytisolo translations brought something of a decisive change in my life. The translation of his work has been inseparable from the way my life has developed."

Bush has been active not only as a literary translator, but also in developing literary translation as an academic discipline – by working in the academic world; serving in key literary translation organisations; serving on the editorial boards of literary translation publications; and organising international events and projects.

After teaching in London schools he joined Middlesex University where he was Associate Senior Lecturer in Spanish (1993–1995), Reader in Literary Translation (1995–1997) and Professor of Literary Translation (1997–1998). He then moved to the University of East Anglia, where he was Director of the British Centre for Literary Translation (BCLT) (1998–2003), and Professor of Literary Translation at the School of English and American Studies. He has been a visiting professor at University of São Paulo (1996), Boston University (1996, 1999) and Beijing University (2001).

Bush has held key positions in important literary translation organisations: Literary Translation Committee (Chair); International Translators Federation (Vice-President, 1996–2003); American Literary Translators Association (board of directors, 1999–2002); Committee for Literary Translation in Higher Education (Convenor, 1993–1999); In Other Words (Executive Committee, Founder and editor, 1995–2003); The European Network of Literary Translation Centres (RECIT) (2000–2003).

Bush has also served on several editorial boards: Mediterraneans, a journal of literature, culture and politics (Paris), published by The Mediterranean Study Group (since 1993); Middlesex University Press (1996–2001); The Encyclopaedia of Literary Translation, Fitzroy Dearbourne (1997–2000); Pretexts, Pen & Ink, University of East Anglia (2002–2004); The Massachusetts Review (since 2014).

== Awards and honours ==
- 2015 Awarded the La Creu de Sant Jordi, most distinguished award given by the Generalitat of Catalonia, for the translation and promotion of Catalan literature
- 2015 His translation of The Gray Notebook by Josep Pla was shortlisted for the 2015 PEN USA Translated Fiction Award
- 2014 Awarded the Premi Ramon Llull for Literary Translation from Catalan, for his translation of The Gray Notebook by Josep Pla
- 2014 His translation of The Sound of One Hand Killing by Teresa Solana was shortlisted for the 2014 Goldboro Last Laugh Award
- 2014 His translation of Run or Die by Kilian Jornet was shortlisted for the 2014 William Hill Sports Book of the Year
- 2014 His translation of Uncertain Glory by Joan Sales was named one of the Ten Best Works of Fiction for 2014 by The Economist magazine.
- 2012 Awarded the 2012 Premio Valle-Inclán for his translation of Exiled from Almost Everywhere by Juan Goytisolo
- 2012 His translation of Still Life No.41 by Teresa Solana was short-listed for an Edgar Allan Poe Award by the American Association of Crime Writers
- 2011 Received the Cruz de Oficial, Orden del Mérito Civil, awarded by King Juan Carlos of Spain, for contribution to the creation of cultural dialogue between UK and Spain
- 2009 Awarded the Calouste Gulbenkian Portuguese Translation Prize for his translation of Equator by Miguel Sousa Tavares.
- 1997 Awarded the Premio Valle-Inclán for his translation of The Marx Family Saga by Juan Goytisolo
- 1994 Received the Outstanding Translation Award from the American Literary Translators Association for his translation of The Old Man Who Read Love Stories by Luis Sepúlveda

== Works ==
=== Translations ===
From Catalan

- Joan Cases: Naked – Black Beach Catalan Drama (Parthian Press, 2009).
- Najat El Hachmi: The Last Patriarch (Serpent's Tail, 2010).
- Najat El Hachmi: The Body Hunter (Serpent's Tail, 2013)
- Kilian Jornet: Run or Die (Velo Books, 2013)
- Empar Moliner: I Love You When I'm Drunk (Comma Productions, 2008).
- Quim Monzó: The Enormity of the Tragedy (Peter Owen Ltd, 2008).
- Quim Monzó: Guadalajara (Open Letter, 2011).
- Quim Monzó: A Thousand Morons (Open Letter, 2012).
- Quim Monzó: Why, why, why? (Open Letter, 2019).
- Josep Pla: Life Embitters (Archipelago, 2014)
- Josep Pla: The Gray Notebook (NYRB, 2014)
- Josep Pla: Salt Water (Archipelago Books, 2020)
- Jordi Puntí: Messi: Lessons in Style (Short Books, 2019)
- Mercè Rodoreda: In Diamond Square (Virago, 2013)
- Joan Sales: Uncertain glory (MacLehose Press, London, 2014).
- Joan Sales: Winds of the Night (MacLehose Press)
- Francesc Serés: Russian Stories (MacLehose Press)
- Teresa Solana: A Shortcut to Paradise
- Teresa Solana: A not so perfect crime (Bitter Lemon Press, London, 2008)
- Teresa Solana: The Sound of One Hand Killing (Bitter Lemon, 2013)
- Emili Teixidor: Black Bread (Biblioasis, 2016)
- Teresa Solana: Black Storms (Corylus, 2024)
- Teresa Solana: The Butterfly House (Corylus, 2026)

From French

- Alain Badiou: In Praise of Love (Serpent's Tail, 2012; The New Press, USA)
- Monica Waitzfelder: L'Oreal Took My Home, The secrets of a theft (Arcadia, 2006).

From Spanish

- Pedro Almodóvar: The flower of my secret (Faber and Faber, London and Boston, 1996).
- Nuria Amat:Queen Cocaine (City Lights Books, San Francisco, 2005).
- Jorge Carrión: Bookshops (The MacLehose Press, 2016).
- Daniel Chavarria: Tango for a Torturer (Serpent's Tail, 2006).
- Pedro Antonio de Alarcón: The Three-Cornered Hat (Hesperus Press, 2004).
- Fernando de Rojas: Celestina (Dedalus Books, 2009).
- Orlando Gonzalez Esteva: Enigma, Old Friend / The Drawings of Juan Soriano (Ave del Paraiso, Madrid, 2000), tr with Anne McLean.
- Juan Goytisolo: Quarantine (1994).
- Juan Goytisolo: The Marx family saga (City Lights Books, San Francisco, 1999).
- Juan Goytisolo: The garden of secrets (Serpent's Tail, London, 2000).
- Juan Goytisolo: Realms of Strife (Quartet/North Point Press; 2nd ed. Verso, 2000).
- Juan Goytisolo: Landscapes of war: from Sarajevo to Chechnya (City Lights Books, San Francisco, 2000).
- Juan Goytisolo: Forbidden territory (Quartet/North Point Press; 2nd ed. Verso, 2000).
- Juan Goytisolo: The Blind Rider (Serpent's Tail, 2005).
- Juan Goytisolo: Cinema Eden Essays on the Muslim Mediterranean (Sickle Moon Press, 2005).
- Juan Goytisolo: A cock-eyed comedy: starring friar Bugeo Montesino and other fairies of motley feather and fortune (City Lights Books, San Francisco, 2005).
- Juan Goytisolo: Juan the Landless (Dalkey Archive Press, Champaign, IL, 2009).
- Juan Goytisolo: Níjar Country (Lumen Books, Santa Fe, NM, 2010).
- Juan Goytisolo: Exiled from Almost Everywhere (Dalkey Archive Press, 2011).
- Federico García Lorca: Sketches of Spain: Impressions and Landscapes (Serif, 2013).
- Antonio Muñoz Molina: The Prince of Darkness (Quartet, 1993).
- Juan Carlos Onetti: The Pit and Tonight (1991).
- Juan Carlos Onetti: Farewells and a Grave with No Name (1992).
- Juan Carlos Onetti: No Man's Land (1994).
- Juan Carlos Onetti: Past Caring? (London, 1995).
- Adolfo Garcia Ortega: Desolation Island (Secker Harvill, 2011).
- Adolfo Garcia Ortega: The Birthday Buyer (Hispabooks, 2013).
- Ignacio Padilla: Shadow without a name, tr. with Anne McLean (Farrar, Straus and Giroux, New York, 2003).
- Leonardo Padura: Havanna Black (Bitter Lemon, 2006).
- Leonardo Padura: Havana Blue (Bitter Lemon Press, London, 2007).
- Leonardo Padura: Havana Gold (Bitter Lemon, 2008).
- Leonardo Padura: Havana Fever (Bitter Lemon, 2009).
- Senel Paz: Strawberry & chocolate (Bloomsbury, London, 1995).
- Fernando Royuela: A Bad End (Hispabooks).
- Luis Sepúlveda: The old man who read love stories (Harcourt Brace, New York, 1994).
- Narcís Serra: The Military Transition (Cambridge University Press, 2010).
- Ramón del Valle-Inclán: Tyrant Banderas (NYRB, 2012).
- (ed.) The voice of the turtle : an anthology of Cuban stories (Quartet Books, London, 1997).
- (ed. with Lisa Dillman) Spain (Whereabouts Press, Berkeley, CA, 2003). Anthology of translated Spanish literature in the Travelers' literary companion series.
- Miguel Delibes, The Holy Innocents (Yale University Press/The Margellos World Republic of Letters, 2026); Shortlisted for the 2026 Spain-USA Foundation Translation Award (SUFTA).

From Portuguese

- Chico Buarque: Turbulence (Bloomsbury/Pantheon, 1992).
- Miguel Sousa Tavares: Equator (Bloomsbury, 2008).

=== Writings about Translation ===
- Rimbaud's Rainbow: literary translation in higher education, ed. with Kirsten Malkkjaer (J. Benjamins, Amsterdam and Philadelphia, 1998).
- The Translator as Writer, ed. with Susan Bassnett (Continuum, 2006).
- 'Memory, War and Translation: Mercè Rodoreda's In Diamond Square, in Brian Nelson and Brigid Maher (eds) Perspectives on Literature and Translation Creation, Circulation, Reception (Routledge, 2013) Chapter 2, pp. 31–46.
- ‘Toil, trouble and jouissance : a case study – editing Juan the Landless’, in Rita Wilson and Leah Gerber (eds) Creative Constraints Translation and Authorship (Monash University Publishing, Melbourne) Chapter 8, pp. 119–131.
- 'The Centrality of a Translator’s Culture: Fernando de Rojas’s Celestina and the Creation of Style in Translation', The AALITRA Review: A Journal of Literary Translation, No.2, 2009 (Melbourne: Monash University), pp. 21–36.
- ‘Writing Translations’, in Susan Bassnett and Peter Bush (eds), The Translator as Writer, Continuum, 2005.
- ‘Intertextuality and the Translator as Story Teller’, Traduire l’intertextualité, Palimpsestes 18, 2005, pp. 213–229.
- ‘The Political Interventions of a Literary Translator: the case of Strawberry and Chocolate’, Traduire (SFT), 2005.
- ‘The Act of Translation’, Translations Studies Working Papers (UMIST), 2002.
- ‘Reviewing Translations: Barcelona, London and Paris’, Entretext, University of Brunel, 2000.
- ‘Latin American fiction in translation’, in Peter France (ed), Encyclopedia of Literature in English Translation, OUP, 2000.
- ‘On Translating Lawrence Norfolk, Or Dialecting the Dialectics of Name’, The Barcelona Review, 20, September 2000.
- ‘Translating Onetti for Anglo-Saxon Others’, in Gustavo San Román (ed), Juan Carlos Onetti and others, SUNY, 1999.
- ‘The Translator as Arbiter’, in Pilar Orerro and Juan Sager (eds) The Translator’s Dialogue: Giovanni Pontiero, John Benjamin (Amsterdam and Philadelphia, 1996)
- ‘The Translator as Reader and Writer’, Donaire, 8, 1996, pp. 20–26.
- ‘It doesn’t sound like English’, Times Literary Supplement, no. 4875, 1996, p. 11.

== Projects, conferences, seminars developing the field of literary translation ==
- 2010 FIT Symposium ‘Jean Genet, Translation and Censorship’, Salle Roger Blin, Théâtre de l’Odéon, Paris.
- 2009 Salzburg Global Seminar ‘Traduttore Traditore? Recognizing and Promoting the Critical Role of Translation in Global Culture.’
- 2006 FIT Symposium ‘Translating Harry Potter: The Art and the Economics’, UNESCO, Paris.
- 2002 ‘Territories of Life and Writing: autobiography and fiction in the work of Juan Goytisolo’, University of East Anglia.
- 2002 BCLT Third International Literary Translation Summer School, Cambridge.
- 2001 FIT International Seminar on Literary Translation and research, University of East Anglia (UEA).
- 2001 BCLT Second International Literary Translation Summer School, Cambridge.
- 2000 ‘Translation, Knowledges and Cultures’ symposium, jointly with the British Academy, London.
- 2000 BCLT First International Literary Translation Summer School, UEA.
- 2000 Young Writers and Translators seminar, Tarazona, Spain.
- 1999 Hispanic & English Literatures in Professional Partnership: Strategies for Translation – two seminars organised with the Spanish Translator’s Centre for the British Council, UEA and Valencia UIMP.
- 1999 BCLT Symposium on Literary Translation and Gender, UEA.
- 1999 ITI Symposium on the EC Culture 2000 Framework, UEA.
- 1999 New translation of Don Quijote, organised with TRIO, Oxford University
- 1998 Co-organiser, ITI International Colloquium, ‘Translating and Community’, Sheffield University.
- 1998 Project Leader European Community Second ARIANE network ‘The Translator as Reader and Writer’ with the following seminars: ‘Translation in Eastern Europe’, Prague; ‘Translating Poetry’, Amsterdam; ‘Theatre in Translation’, Brussels; ‘Libraries and Literary translation’, Finedon
- 1997 Project leader European Community First ARIANE with the following seminars: ‘Translation and Power’, Frankfurt Book Fair; ‘Literary translation in the Bilingual Context’, Barcelona; ‘Research, Publishing and Literary Translation’, Middlesex University.
- 1997 ‘The Politics of Translation’ (India, Africa and the USA), International Centre, Frankfurt Bookfair.
- 1996 Co-organiser of three-day ITI International Colloquium, The Practices of Literary Translation, University of East Anglia.
- 1996 Co-organiser with the Director of the Cervantes Institute, International Conference, Literary Translation: To and From the Languages of Spain, Middlesex University.
- 1995 Co-organiser, Conference on the Translation of Philosophy, Middlesex University.
- 1995 Co-organiser of the three-day ITI International Colloquium, Warwick University on Literary Translation in Higher Education.
