= Uncertain Glory (2017 film) =

- Catalan film poster
- Catalan: Incerta glòria
- Directed by: Agustí Villaronga
- Screenplay by: Agustí Villaronga; Coral Cruz
- Based on: Uncertain Glory by Joan Sales
- Produced by: Isona Passola
- Starring: Marcel Borràs; Núria Prims; Oriol Pla; Bruna Cusí; Luisa Gavasa; Terele Pávez; Fernando Esteso; Juan Diego
- Production companies: Massa d'Or Produccions; Televisió de Catalunya
- Distributed by: Alfa Pictures
- Release date: 17 March 2017
- Running time: 115 minutes
- Country: Spain
- Language: Catalan

Uncertain Glory (Catalan: Incerta glòria) is a 2017 Spanish drama film directed by Agustí Villaronga based on the eponymous novel by Joan Sales. Shot in Catalan, its cast is led by Marcel Borràs, Núria Prims, Oriol Pla and Bruna Cusí.

== Plot ==
Set in 1937, with the backdrop of the Spanish Civil War, a young Republican officer becomes infatuated with a mysterious widow.

== Cast ==
- Marcel Borràs as Lluís
- Núria Prims as Carlana
- Oriol Pla as Soleràs
- Bruna Cusí as Trini
- Luisa Gavasa as tia Olerana
- Fernando Esteso as moliner
- Terele Pávez as molinera
- Juan Diego as Cagorcio

== Production ==
Based on the eponymous novel by Joan Sales, Uncertain Glory was written by the director Agustí Villaronga alongside Coral Cruz. Isona Passola took over production duties. It was produced by Massa D'or Produccions and Televisió de Catalunya (TVC) with the participation of RTVE, Movistar+ and Aragón TV and support from ICEC and ICAA. It was shot in 2016. Filming primarily took place in Aragon, as well as La Garriga and Barcelona.

== Release ==
Distributed by Alfa Pictures, the film was theatrically released on 17 March 2017.

== Reception ==
Quim Casas of El Periódico de Catalunya rated the film with 4 out of 5 stars, considering that Villaronga "splendidly directs" the cast, Núria Prims in particular. He deemed the war setting to have a secondary role in the plot, just as a device to switch everything else on: "a trail of conflicting feelings, affective hostilities, devastating sexual impulses, delusions, hatreds and quarrels, the seed of evil in its purest form".

Reviewing for Fotogramas, Pere Vall gave the film 4 out of 5 stars, deeming Oriol Pla's emotional performance to be the best about the film while noting as a negative point that the plot featured some trip to Barcelona that could have dealt with as an ellipsis.

Toni Vall of Cinemanía scored 4 out of 5 stars, considering that the story tracking the five main characters "manages to transcend the purely historical sketch, taking possession of their souls, dissecting them and injecting cinema into them".

Javier Ocaña of El País deemed Uncertain Glory to be an "unquestionable" heir to Pa negre, a "fantastic production set in the rearguard of the Civil War", praising, in addition of Villaronga's craft, the cinematography, the production design, the "very risky" score and the cast.

== Awards and nominations ==
| Year | Award | Category | Nominee(s) | Result | Ref. |
|---|---|---|---|---|---|
| 2018 | 5th Feroz Awards | Best Actress (film) | Núria Prims | Nominated | |
| 2018 | 5th Feroz Awards | Best Supporting Actor (film) | Oriol Pla | Nominated | |
| 2018 | 10th Gaudí Awards | Best Film | | Nominated | |
| 2018 | 10th Gaudí Awards | Best Direction | Agustí Villaronga | Nominated | |
| 2018 | 10th Gaudí Awards | Best Leading Actress | Núria Prims | Won | |
| 2018 | 10th Gaudí Awards | Best Leading Actor | Marcel Borràs | Nominated | |
| 2018 | 10th Gaudí Awards | Best Supporting Actress | Bruna Cusí | Nominated | |
| 2018 | 10th Gaudí Awards | Best Supporting Actor | Oriol Pla | Won | |
| 2018 | 10th Gaudí Awards | Best Screenplay | | Nominated | |
| 2018 | 10th Gaudí Awards | Best Production Supervision | Aleix Castellón | Won | |
| 2018 | 10th Gaudí Awards | Best Art Direction | | Nominated | |
| 2018 | 10th Gaudí Awards | Best Editing | | Nominated | |
| 2018 | 10th Gaudí Awards | Best Original Score | | Nominated | |
| 2018 | 10th Gaudí Awards | Best Cinematography | Josep M. Civit | Won | |
| 2018 | 10th Gaudí Awards | Best Costume Design | Mercè Paloma | Won | |
| 2018 | 10th Gaudí Awards | Best Sound | Xavier Mas, Fernando Novillo & Ricard Galceran | Won | |
| 2018 | 10th Gaudí Awards | Best Visual Effects | Manuel López Egea & Bernat Aragonés | Won | |
| 2018 | 10th Gaudí Awards | Best Makeup and Hairstyles | Alma Casal | Won | |
| 2018 | 32nd Goya Awards | Best Adapted Screenplay | Agustí Villaronga & Coral Cruz | Nominated | |
| 2018 | 27th Actors and Actresses Union Awards | Best Film Actor in a Minor Role | Jorge Usón | Won | |

== See also ==
- List of Spanish films of 2017
