= Uncertain Glory (novel) =

Novel by Joan Sales i Vallès

Uncertain Glory (Catalan: Incerta Glòria) is a novel by the Catalan writer and publisher Joan Sales i Vallès. The backdrop to the novel is the Spanish Civil War, in which Sales fought on the Republican side. The novel portrays the war in all its brutal complexity and offers no obvious partisan message. As Spanish writer Juan Goytisolo (Note: Goytisolo was instrumental in publishing an uncensored, but incomplete, French translation in 1962. The positive reviews of the novel in France led to Sales’s Spanish passport being withdrawn.) points out in his foreword, Sales "does not root his thinking in certainties but rather in lives exposed to the world’s absurdity, its procession of blood, death and injustice".

== History ==
Sales began writing the novel in 1948 at the age of thirty-six on his return to Barcelona after nine years of exile from Franco’s Spain. He initially tried to have it published in 1955, but it was rejected by the Francoist censors because it "expressed heretical ideas often in disgusting and obscene language". However, in 1956 it was given the nihil obstat (‘nothing stands in the way’) by the Archbishop of Barcelona and the censor accordingly authorised its publication, albeit with major cuts. Sales continued writing and adding to the text until the definitive fourth edition in 1971, by which time it had become a much longer and more complex novel.

== Title ==
The title, Uncertain Glory, clearly had great significance for the author. As Sales states in his preface to the novel: "The uncertain glory on an April day….if I had to sum up my novel in a single line, I wouldn’t use any other". The line is from Shakespeare’s Two Gentlemen of Verona (Act 1 Scene 3):

"O, how this spring of love resembleth

The uncertain glory of an April day,

Which now shows all the beauty of the sun,

And by and by a cloud takes all away!"

On one level, the title refers to the enthusiasm raised by the declaration of a Catalan Republic on 14 April 1931 (Note: On 14 April 1931, two days after the Spanish local elections that led to king Alfonso XIII going into exile and a few hours before the proclamation of the Second Spanish Republic in Madrid, Macià proclaimed the Catalan Republic within an Iberian Federation. However, three days later, the government of the new Spanish Republic sent three ministers to Barcelona to negotiate with Macià and the Catalan provisional government. Macià reached an agreement with the ministers, by which the Catalan Republic was renamed Generalitat of Catalonia, an autonomous government within the Spanish Republic.) by Francesc Macià from the balcony of the Palau de la Generalitat. In fact, Sales described this day in an interview published soon after his death as the happiest day in his life. However, on another more general level, the title may also be a metaphor for the passing of youth and the ephemeral nature of its dreams and hopes.

"A moment comes in life when you feel that you are waking from a dream. Our youth is behind us …… perhaps youth has never been anything but a gloomy storm streaked by lightning flashes of glory, of uncertain glory, on an April day".

== Synopsis ==
Sales’ novel narrates the experiences of four young Catalans, both at the front and at the rearguard, from that "uncertain glory on an April day" to the chaotic and tragic collapse of the Aragon front in 1938, which was to lead to the Francoist occupation of Catalonia and the defeat of the Spanish Republican forces the following year.

== Structure ==
Divided into three parts, the novel is narrated by three of the characters, with changing perspectives and time frames. A fourth part set in the devastated landscape of Barcelona and Catalonia under the Franco dictatorship is now published as a separate novel, Winds of the Night (Catalan: El vent de la nit).

== Main characters ==
- Lluís de Broca, a well-to-do lawyer, who is now a Republican officer. He is initially posted to take charge of anarchist militiamen in Madrid, but is then dispatched to a militarised unit in a village on the Aragon front, which had been collectivised by the anarchists but now abandoned by them. He becomes infatuated with the lady of the castle in the village.
- Trini Milmany, the daughter of utopian anarchists, a geologist and Lluís’s partner. She remains in Barcelona to care for their child, born outside marriage. Increasingly estranged from Lluís, Trini turns to the Catholic church and attends clandestine masses in city attics.
- Cruells, who had been studying for the priesthood, but now serves a medical adjutant on the front. His love for Trini remains unrequited.
- Juli Soleràs, a friend of Trini and Lluís from their student days, when they were all drawn to anarchism. In many ways he is the central character of the novel, an enigmatic and provocative Dostoevskian anti-hero, half-philosopher, half-cynic, who fascinates the other three with his crazed lucidity. Soleràs serves with the Republican forces but regularly makes forays across the lines. He too is in love with Trini and even offers to marry her.

== Themes ==
Interwoven in the novel are a number of themes, from the political to the metaphysical:

- Beyond the very real and crucial ideological divisions of the Civil War (fascism vs democracy, right vs left...) the reality on the ground was more complex. While the Catholic church hierarchy was almost unanimously pro-Franco, many Catholics fought for the Spanish Republic and for Catalan self-determination. Others like the would-be-priest Cruells "were republican because the zone where we happened to be, where we were born, was republican".
- Love and friendship. Trini reacts to Solaràs’s offer of marriage: "I feel your suggestion is absurd because of the very things I admire in you. You are too intelligent and love is a jungle. A couple of wild animals howling on the edge of a precipice."
- Faith, and the loss of faith, in the face of the absurdity of life. "We who don’t have any faith wish we did, but the contrary …. to have faith and wish we didn’t would be absurd."
- The false security of youth and the loss of one’s youthful illusions. "It was the glory of an April day we didn’t anticipate would be so uncertain: who’d have thought that explosion of joy would end five years later in the most absurd butchery".
- Humanity’s existential search for meaning in the face of absurdity and the mystery of life and death, "the macabre and the obscene".

== English translation ==
In 2014, Peter Bush made a much-acclaimed translation of the novel into English. It was selected by the Economist magazine as one of the ten best novels that same year.

== Film version ==
In 2017, Agustí Villaronga directed a film version: Uncertain Glory. It became the first film made in Catalan to be distributed by Netflix.
