= Black Bread (novel) =

Catalan novel on the aftermath of the Spanish Civil War

Black Bread (Catalan: Pa negre) is a semi-autobiographical novel published by the Catalan pedagogue, journalist and writer, Emili Teixidor i Viladecàs in 2003, when the author was seventy years old, it describes the coming of age of a young boy in the repressive aftermath of the Spanish Civil War in rural Catalonia.

== Title ==
The book’s title refers to the dark bread (Note: Black bread was a kind of wholemeal bread made with low quality cereals.) rationed to the poor in Spain during the 1940s, the “hungry years”. It is a metaphor for the post-Civil War period marked by widespread poverty, a thriving black market, and the ongoing repression of the Franco regime. (Note: It is unlikely that Teixidor or Andreu, the protagonist of the novel, ate much or any black bread. On the farmhouses where they lived the people baked their own bread.)

== Synopsis ==
The narrator, eleven-year-old Andreu, whose father is a political prisoner and whose mother is a factory worker, is sent to live with tenant farmer relatives in rural Catalonia after the war. He settles into a seemingly idyllic rural life with his young cousins, observing the adult world from the vantage of a plum tree. However, the miseries of Catalonia under fascist domination begin to encroach upon this idyll. We learn that Andreu’s father is facing a death sentence for his political activities, his mother, after working long hours in the factory, is desperately lobbying local bigwigs to obtain his release, Andreu’s cousin’s parents have been forced to seek exile in France and that the large family in the farmhouse is viewed with suspicion by the local Francoist authorities and the Civil Guard. The survival of the family entails subterfuge and secrecy. Andreu and his cousins struggle to understand the language charged with double meanings that the adults of the family use when discussing their secrets, the “language of gestures, grimaces, exclamations, hints and half-words”.

The children have their own secret world as they roam through the woods, catching sight of lovers, thieves and a woman who went mad after her boyfriend had been executed in front of her and now runs naked between the trees. At the same time, they also become very aware of their own awakening sexuality.

When the children discover a disembowelled, stolen horse which has been left to rot on the farm grounds, the mysterious death of such a beautiful animal signals to the children that their days of innocence are coming to an end. Andreu says “Once we’d run out of stories, the ghost of that dead horse returned to fill the gap in our conversation”. Unlike his classmates, he is clear that he does not wish to end up working on the land or the factory floor and when his father dies in prison, he is presented with the possibility of continuing his education under the wing of the affluent owners of the farmhouse and lands, who unlike his own family are among the victors in the Civil War. But this entails Andreu moving elsewhere and leaving his family behind.

== Major themes ==
=== Post-Civil War repression in Catalonia ===
Andreu’s experience is that of children “who find their parents have been defeated and that the victors simply intend to continue the war by other means.”. He runs free in the woods, but everything—language, (Note: Not just the coded ambiguous language that the adults in the family use. Also, the Catalan language itself, which was banned for public use under Franco.) school, opinions—is circumscribed by the dictatorship. His father is in prison and sentenced to death as a ‘red’ and the wider family is under suspicion from the local Francoist authorities. Even his uncle, the head of household at the farm, who has never been active politically, is suspect for “sitting on the fence” during the Civil War and not getting involved now in “cleaning up the Fatherhood”. All this leads to an atmosphere of fear, subterfuge and deception among the family members, which the children seek to decode: “The outside world was divided up between our folk and the others we guessed were enemies. We gradually discovered that the others were also the fascists”.

=== National Catholicism ===
The Francoist propaganda depicted the Civil War as a religious crusade against the “atheist-masonic-judaeo-bolshevik” Second Spanish Republic. The Spanish bishops gave full support to Franco’s uprising. Following the brutal destruction of Guernica by the Luftwaffe, the hierarchy of the Spanish church expressed support for Franco’s uprising, which they described as an “armed plebiscite”.

Following the Francoist victory, attendance at mass was made compulsory for the whole population as was the First Communion for all children. Teachers at school questioned their pupils to make sure they had attended mass the previous day. Andreu explains: “On Monday when we reached school, the master made us say which mass we’d been to, with whom, what was the colour of the celebrant’s chasuble, what was the sermon about, who’d seen us there.”

However, many Catalan (Note: For example, the Catalan writer Joan Sales, who was an officer in the Republican army and the Christian Democrat politician Manuel Carrasco Formiguera, who was executed by order of Franco.) and Basque Catholics gave support to the Republic against the fascists. Moreover, Andreu’s uncle is protected by the Father Tafalla, Father Superior of the Camillus monastery, close to the family farmhouse. Father Tafalla is from the Basque Navarre.

=== The position of women ===
They are often figures trapped in roles and jobs imposed upon them, but sometimes they manage to rebel against this fate.

Andreu’s grandmother, Mercè, is the matriarch of the family. A woman of evident Republican sympathies, she is literate and insists on reading the Barcelona newspaper every afternoon. She brings the Second World War and the Allies’ victories into the family conversations, longing for any news of setbacks for Franco. (Note: Although he clearly sympathized with the Axis powers, Franco largely stayed out of World War II, but he did send nearly 50,000 volunteers to fight alongside the Nazis on the Soviet front. Franco also opened his ports to German submarines and invaded the internationally administered city of Tangier in Morocco.) She also regales the children at the farmhouse with scary and at times risqué stories.enthrals her grandchildren with stories of goblins who run up and down the stairs to the attic, but this may well provide a cover for the maquis or perhaps smugglers who pass through the house seeking food and shelter on their way to and from France.

Florència, Andreu’s mother, works long hours in the nearby town’s textile factory, where she has been working since the age of nine or ten. She spends almost all her free time collecting documentation in defence of her imprisoned husband.

Andreu’s attitude to his mother alternates between reverence: “I admired that woman who fought tirelessly, fiercely, in her battle against the scourge of poverty”, and criticism. He rails against the humiliation of accompanying her when she visited supporters of the Franco regime begging for support in defence of her husband:

“I never forgave my mother for exposing my childhood to that humiliating abasement out of love for my father.” Yet the meek attitude she adopted when petitioning was cast aside following the death of her husband when, at his funeral, she courageously confronts and insults the local Francoist authorities.

Andreu’s Aunt Enriqueta, works as a seamstress in the town of Vic but lives in the farmhouse along with Andreu and the others. She is said to have affairs and a “dark life in the depths of the forest” which threaten the survival of the family. She leaves the family home and flees to Barcelona with a novitiate priest with whom she has begun a relationship. They plan to cross the border to France.

Aunt Felisa is forced to marry a man who she doesn’t love.

Aunt Meriona, disgraced after eloping with a married man, fled to Barcelona to work as a maid.

The factory women: We are given a glimpse of the women who work in the textile factory when Andreu accompanies his father in the bus ferrying them to and from work. “They sing, flirt and engage in political banter that Andreu picks up on. They’ve moved out of the kitchen and have an independence of mind”.

== Sex and love ==
Teixidor’s treatment of Andreu’s sexual coming of age is both lyrical and sensitive. His cousin, Núria, invites him to explore her body in a forest hideout. However, during the sex play Andreu is puzzled by the images flashing through his mind of the body of a young male tuberculosis patient stretched out on the grass in the garden of the local monastery. He puts it down to the fact that adults often appear to lead dark secret lives and this vision is an indication that he is growing into being an adult.

Núria reveals to Andreu that their schoolteacher, Mr Madern, who has been something of a mentor for him, has been sexually abusing her and, prior to that, also another girl from the school. Andreu’s reaction is one of resentment and anger towards Madern. This feeling of anger he finds useful to prove his own self-worth and “a huge step forward on the road towards the conquest of the outside world, towards growing up”. At the same time, he comes to view sex with suspicion: “Sex and its various manifestations were to blame for the fact that the world was one gigantic game of nonsense”.

== Memory ==
Andreu meditates on the nature of memory: “Does memory have a guiding thread or purpose?” How does memory determine the kind of person we become? If the memories of friends or family fade, does their significance fade too? Andreu’s response is a cynical one: “Growing up was all about that: breaking with the past and moving forward, forcefully and not looking back….brutally, if needs be, because that new world was harsh and only accepted the bravest, the most intelligent or wealthiest”.

Andreu leaves the home of the losers of the Civil War and joins the world of its victors, the owners of the farmhouse and its lands, who are now diversifying into industry. For Teixidor, Andreu’s conscious amnesia represents a collective phenomenon (Note: Teixidor stated in an interview that with the exception of the members of the PSUC and those who risked their lives to oppose the dictatorship, “we were all passive Francoists”.) in the aftermath of the Civil War: “The young protagonist becomes a stand-in for a society that is forced to abandon its beliefs to survive in a country ruled by a dictatorial regime.”

== Awards ==
The novel has won a number of awards: Premis de la crítica Joan Crexells, Lletra d’Or, Maria Àngels Anglada i Nacional de Literatura (The Joan Crexells Critics’ Award, The Gold Letter, The Maria Àngels Anglada and The Catalan National Literature Awards).

== The film ==
The 2010 film Black Bread by Agustí Villaronga, which was inspired by the novel, won thirteen Catalan Gaudí Awards, nine Spanish Goya Awards, including best film, best director and best adapted screenplay. It was selected as the Spanish entry for the Best Foreign Language Film at the 84th Academy Awards (the Oscars) and was the first Catalan-language film to be chosen.

== Translations ==
Following the release of the film, there have been a number of translations of the novel. The English-language translation by literary translator, Peter Bush appeared in 2016.
