= Màrius Torres =

Catalan poet

- Born: 30 August 1910; Lleida, Catalonia, Spain
- Died: 29 October 1942 (aged 32); Sant Quirze Safaja, Catalonia, Spain
- Occupations: Poet, playwright, journalist
- Writing career
- Notable works: Invencions, Poesies
- Literary movement: Symbolism, post-symbolism, noucentisme

Màrius Torres (Catalan pronunciation: [ˈmaɾi.us ˈtorəs]; 30 August 1910 – 29 October 1942) was a Catalan poet, first published by fellow writer Joan Sales in Mexico. He was among the most influential poets in the first 30 years of post-Civil War Catalonia and is today considered one of the most important Catalan poets of the twentieth century.

The son of physician and politician Humbert Torres, he studied at the Liceu Escolar in Lleida from 1920 to 1926 and earned a degree in Medicine from the University of Barcelona. He used the pen name Gregori Sastre to sign his works during the Spanish Civil War, while he was confined in several anti-tuberculosis hospitals. He died in 1942 and was buried in Sant Quirze Safaja.

Today there is a public high school in his home city which is called Institut Màrius Torres.

== Works ==
- Poesies, at "Quaderns de l'exili", Mexico DF 1947.

== See also ==
- Catalan literature
