= Teresa Solana =

Spanish writer

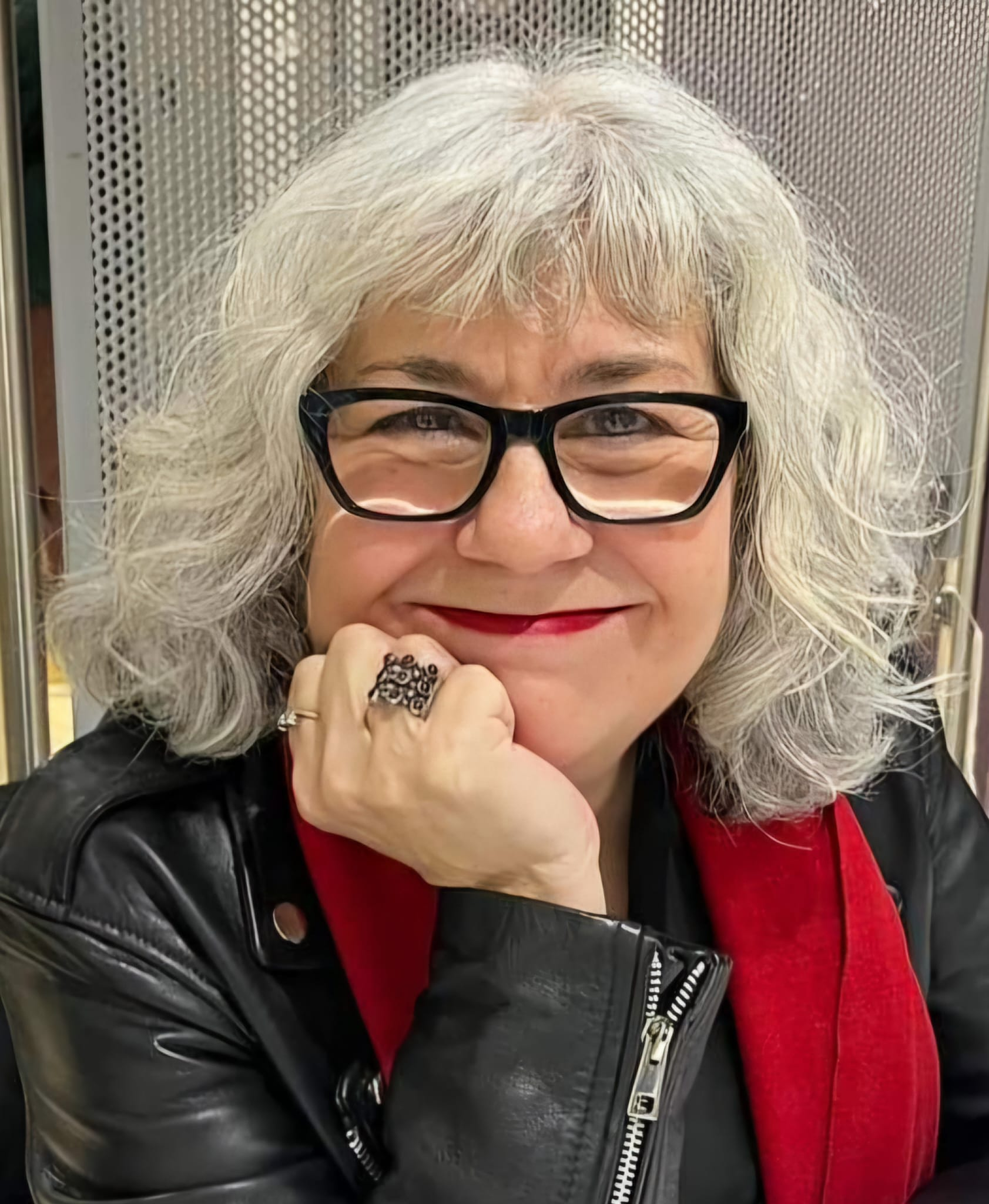
- Born: 15 May 1962 (age 64); Barcelona, Spain
- Occupations: Translator, Novelist

Teresa Solana i Mir (born 15 May 1962 in Barcelona, Spain) is a contemporary Spanish writer of crime fiction in Catalan. She studied philosophy and the Classics at Universitat de Barcelona. Her work has been translated to English, French, German, Esperanto, Italian, Spanish, Hindi and Romanian

Teresa Solana started her professional career as a translator, mainly from French and English. She was the director of the translation center in Tarassona between 1998 and 2004. She also wrote various articles and essays on translation.

In 2006 she published her first novel, Un crim imperfecte, for which she received the Premi Brigada 21 prize. This is the first story in which there appear the twin investigators Eduard and Borja Masdéu. Afterwards she published Drecera al paradís with the same protagonists. In 2010 she published her first, and up to now only, short story collection, Set casos de sang i fetge i una història d'amor. In 2013 she participated in the Edgar Allan Poe Award with the story 'Natura quasi morta 41'. She also published the novel Negres tempestes in which for the first time stars the investigator Norma Forester and with which she won the 3rd Premi Crims de Tinta prize. In 2011 she published L'hora del zen, another story with Eduard and Borja as protagonists. In early 2014 there appeared her seventh novel, La casa de les papallones, protagonized by Norma Forester. Campanes de boda (2016) includes the twin investigators again. Matèria grisa, also a crime novel, won the 19th Premi Roc Boronat prize.

== Bibliography ==
=== Novels ===
- 2006 - Un crim imperfecte
- 2007 - Drecera al paradís
- 2010 - Negres tempestes
- 2011 - L'hora zen
- 2014 - La casa de les papallones
- 2016 - Campanades de boda
- 2019 - Octubre

=== Short stories ===
- 2010 - Set casos de sang i fetge i una història d'amor
- 2017 - Matèria grisa

=== Children's books ===
- 2014 - Sèrie Supernyaps: I La invasió misteriosa
- 2014 - Sèrie Supernyaps: II A la recerca de l’aigua perduda
- 2015 - Sèrie Supernyaps: III L’amenaça zombi
- 2015 - Sèrie Supernyaps: IV Els viatgers del temps

=== Translations ===
- 1995 - Sir Mortimer Wheeler, El arte y la arquitectura de Roma
- 1996 - VVAA, Diccionario de las mitologías: La mitología griega, vol. II,
- 1996 - Sabine Melchior-Bonnet, Historia del espejo
- 1996 - Mª Àngels Anglada, Relatos de mitología. Los dioses
- 1996 - Mª Àngels Anglada, Relatos de mitología. Los héroes
- 1997 - VVAA, Diccionario de las mitologías: De la Roma arcaica a los sincretismos tardíos, vol. III.
- 1997 - Peter Vardy, Kierkegaard
- 1997 - Stephen Plant, Simone Weil
- 1997 - Wilfred MacGreal, San Juan de la Cruz
- 1998 - VVAA, Diccionario de las mitologías: Las mitologías de Europa, vol. IV
- 1999 - Anonymous text from XIV, La nube del no saber
- 1999 - VVAA, Diccionario de las mitologías: Las mitologías de Asia, vol. V
- 2002 - VVAA, Diccionario de las mitologías: Las mitologías de América, África y Oceanía, vol VI
- 2003 - Jimmie Holland and Sheldon Lewis, La cara humana del cáncer

- 2004 - Jean-Yves Hayez, La destructividad en el niño y el adolescente: clínica y seguimiento
- 2004 - Pierre Hadot, Plotino o la simplicidad de la mirada
- 2004 - Dawn Ades, Dalí (Catalogue of the Dalí Exhibition in the Palazzo Grassi in Venice)
- 2005 - Danièle Hervieu-Léger, La religión, hilo de memoria
- 2005 - Juan Goytisolo, 'Bouvard y Pécuchet sobre los pasos de Cervantes'
- 2006 - Michael Heim, Pautas para traducir textos de ciencias sociales
- 2007 - VVAA, Neoimpresionosmo, La eclosión de la modernidad.
- 2007 - Juan Goytisolo, L'arrel de tots els mals
- 2007 - Robin Lane Fox, Alejandro Magno
- 2007 - Teresa Solana, Un crimen imperfecto
- 2007 - Teresa Solana, Atajo al paraíso.
- 2008 - Andoni Gràcia, Chulo, retrato de un autor
- 2008 - VVAA, Yves Tanguy, El universo surrealista
- 2008 - Marta Montmany Madurell, Colección de diseño industrial del Museo de las Artes Decorativas
- 2010 - Kenizé Mourad, A la ciutat d'or i d'argent
- 2011 - Teresa Solana, Negres Tormentas
- 2011 - Donna Leon, Conclusions preliminars
- 2015 - Judith Jonhson i Karl Lewkowicz, Adéu Barcelona
- 2019 - Catalog for Bordeaux Museum of Fine Arts
- 2021 - Catalog for the Museon Arlated of Arles
- 2023 - Carolyn Wells, L’home que va caure a través de la terra
- 2023 - Grant Allen, Un milionari africà
- 2023 - Shane Steves, Ciutat morta
- 2024 - Ethel Lina White, A tota màquina
- 2024 - David Goodis, La lluna sobre l’asfalt

== Translated into English ==
- 2008 - A Not So Perfect Crime (Un crim imperfecte, 2006) translated by Peter Bush
- 2011 - A Shortcut to Paradise (Drecera al paradis, 2007) translated by Peter Bush
- 2013 - The Sound of One Hand Killing (L'hora zen, (2011) translated by Peter Bush
- 2013 - Crazy Tales of Blood and Guts (Set casos de sang i fetge i una història d'amor, 2010) translated by Peter Bush
- 2018 - The First Prehistoric Serial Killer (Matèria grisa, 2017) translated by Peter Bush
- 2024 - Black Storms (Negres tempestes, 2010) translated by Peter Bush
- 2026 - The House of Butterflies (La casa de les papallones, 2014) translated by Peter Bush

== Awards ==
- 2007 - Brigada 21 Prize for Un crim imperfecte (A Not So Perfect Crime) for the best original novel in Catalan
- 2010 - Crims de Tinta Award, organised by the Ministry of Interior of the Generalitat of Catalonia
- 2013 - Shortlisted for the Edgar Allan Poe Awards for the short story Natura quasi morta 41 (Still Life No. 41) in Set casos de sang i fetge i una història d’amor (Crazy Tales of Blood and Guts)
- 2017 - Roc Boronat XIX Award for the anthology of short stories Matèria grisa (The First Prehistoric Serial Killer)
- 2019 - Shortlisted for the CWA Dagger Awards for the short story I Detest Mozart in The First Prehistoric Serial Killer
- 2024 - Margarida Aritzeta-Vila de Creixell Prize for Carpe diem
