= Josep Pla =

Spanish journalist and writer

Josep Pla i Casadevall
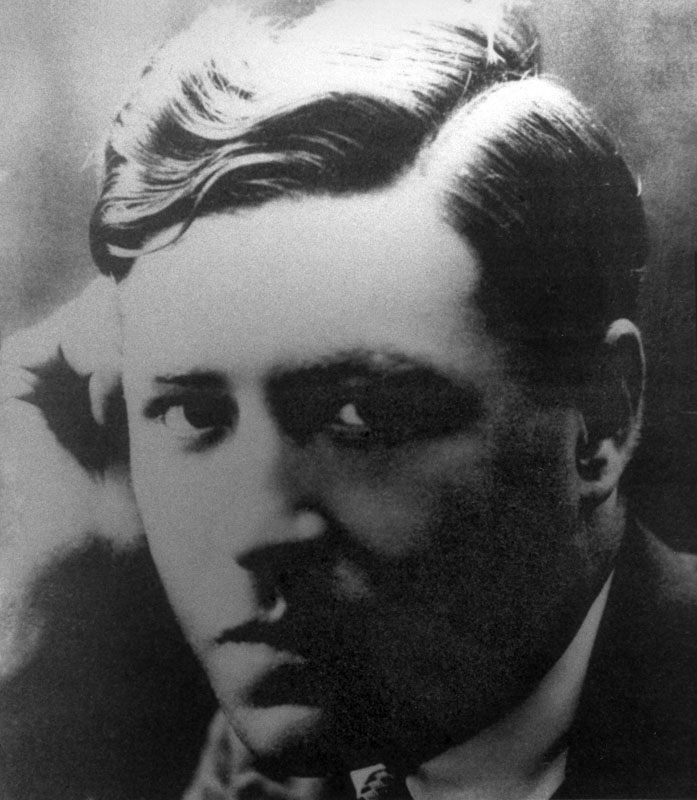
- Pla in 1917
- Born: 8 March 1897; Palafrugell, Catalonia, Spain
- Died: 23 April 1981 (aged 84); Llofriu, Catalonia, Spain
- Education: University of Barcelona
- Occupations: Journalist and writer
- Writing career
- Language: Catalan and Spanish
- Notable work: Life Embitters
- Notable awards: Premi Sant Jordi de novel·la; Order of Civil Merit

Josep Pla i Casadevall (Catalan: [ʒuˈzɛp ˈpla j ˌkazəðəˈβaʎ]; 8 March 1897 – 23 April 1981) was a Spanish journalist and a popular author. As a journalist he worked in France, Italy, Britain, Germany, and the Soviet Union, from where he wrote political and cultural chronicles in Catalan and Spanish.

He is somewhat controversial for present day Catalans. On the one hand, his prose is widely acknowledged as the finest standard of contemporary literature in Catalan, but on the other hand, his ties to Francoist Spain are often frowned upon, though nowadays this is usually disregarded.

== Biography ==
The son of rural business owners of modest means from Baix Empordà, he obtained his high school diploma in Girona, where, beginning in 1909, he was a boarding student at the Colegio de los Maristas (Marist School). In his last academic year (1912–13), he had to take his final exams without having taken the courses because he was expelled from the boarding school. In 1913 he registered to study science at the University of Barcelona and began his studies in medicine but in the middle of his first course, he changed his mind and registered to study law. During this time he became involved with the Barcelona Ateneu Club, with its library and above all the daily tertulia (discussion group) led by Dr. Joaquim Borralleras and attended by celebrities such as Josep Maria de Sagarra, Eugenio d'Ors and Francesc Pujols. His admiration for Pío Baroja came from this period – a constant reference for his generation — as well as the influence of Alexandre Plana, a childhood friend and teacher, whom he credits with his decision to distance himself from the pretentious style of the 19th century and to support “a literature for the whole world” based on “intelligibility, clarity, and simplicity”, ideas which would be constant features through his literary career.

In 1919 he graduated with a degree in Law and began to work in journalism, first in Las Noticias (The News) and soon after in night publication of La Publicidad (Publicity). He started his journey as a correspondent in various European cities (Paris, Madrid, Berlin). A modern Catalan nationalist, in 1921 he was elected as a diputado (Member of Parliament) of the Commonwealth of Catalonia (Commonwealth of Catalonia) by the Lliga Regionalista (Regionalist League) in his native region, Baix Empordà. En 1924, under the dictatorship of Primo de Rivera, he underwent a military trial and was condemned to exile because of a critical article about the Spanish military policy in Morocco, published in Majorca's El Día (The Day).

During the years of his exile he liaised with some of the principal Catalan opponents of the dictatorship such as Francesc Macià. He continued travelling through Europe (France, the Soviet Union, Britain), and in 1925 he published his first book, Coses Vistes which was a great success and sold out in a week. It was a good preview of his aesthetic: "to write about the things which one has seen". In 1927 he returned to Spain, left La Publicidad and began to collaborate with La Veu de Catalunya, the Lliga Regionalista's newspaper of a liberal-conservative tendency, under the orders of Francesc Cambó – leader of moderate Catalan nationalism, whose famous tertulias he attended regularly.

In April 1931, on the same morning as the proclamation of the Republic of Spain, he was invited to Madrid by Cambó as parliamentary correspondent of La Veu and became a witness to the first days of the Republic. His book of the notable events of those months - of great historic value - is El advenimiento de la República (The coming of the Republic). He remained in Madrid during nearly all of the Republican period writing features about Parliament which allowed him to mix with the Spanish political and cultural elite. Pla, who was neither an anti-republican nor an anti-monarchist but a pragmatist who wanted to see a modernisation of the State, at first expressed a certain sympathy for the Republic. He believed that the new political system could get off the ground in Spain if it consolidated itself according to the French Republican model. In due course he slowly became disillusioned with the course of events until he eventually considered it “a frantic and destructive madness”.

Claiming health reasons, he abandoned a fractious and dangerous Madrid a few months before the beginning of the Spanish Civil War. As not even Barcelona seemed safe to him he fled in a boat from Catalonia to Marseille in September 1938 in the company of Adi Enberg, a Norwegian citizen born in Barcelona who worked for the Francoist espionage service. She was the only person from his secretive and often meagre romantic life with whom we can be certain that he was involved. He continued his exile in Rome, where he wrote a good part of the immense Historia de la Segunda República Española (History of the Second Spanish Republic) - an assignment for Francesc Cambó, one of the financiers of the military uprising - which Pla would refuse to re-publish during his lifetime despite its great historical value. In the autumn of 1938, Enberg and Pla traveled to Biarritz and from there they managed to reach San Sebastián where they entered the Francoist-controlled part of Spain. In January 1939 he, Manuel Aznar and other journalists entered Barcelona along with the victorious Francoist troops. Between February and April 1939 when the war ended, he became the assistant manager of the newspaper La Vanguardia under the direction of Aznar. Overwhelmed by the course of events of the immediate post-war period and before the unexpected failure of his project at La Vanguardia, he moved to the Empordà (Girona) and separated from Adi Enberg.

In September 1939 he published his first article in Destino, the weekly publication his Catalan friends created in Burgos and for which he started to write weekly a few months later, from February 1940. These are the years he spent travelling around his native region, discovering its landscapes and people, small towns and, of course, the sea. He also finally accepted his role of lower rural bourgeois and never again lived in Barcelona.

Pla continued to contribute to Destino and traveled as a journalistic observer to France, Israel, Cuba, New York, the Middle East, South America, and the Soviet Union. His 1957 visit to Israel, arriving by boat from Marseille, resulted in reports on the country's early development and infrastructure. Pla frequently traveled on oil tankers to write his works.

In the 1970s Pla dedicated himself fully to the preparation of his complete works. This was not mere collation but involved almost total re-writing of his oeuvre and the development of his own unique style. In order to publish these works he counted on invaluable support of his fellow countryman Josep Vergés, editor of Destino. Meanwhile, culture in the Catalan language was reappearing little by little.

After Francoism ended with the Spanish Constitution of 1978 and despite his already being the most-read writer in the Catalan language, fellow Catalan authors (overwhelmingly of the Left) did not forgive him for his support of the Francoists during the Civil War and his later coexistence with the régime (Pla had counted on a peaceful and ordered evolution towards democracy). He was also criticised by Catalan authors because of his disdain for fiction as a literary form.

Even so, in 1980, near the end of his life, Josep Tarradellas gave him the Medalla d'Or de la Generalitat de Catalunya (the Gold Medal of the Autonomous Government of Catalonia). It is worth mentioning, as it represented a minor fissure in the so-far monolithic rejection of Pla by writers in Catalan, that Joan Coromines, a fundamental Catalan etymologist, supported Pla in his own acceptance speech for the gold medal Coromines that was also granted.

Pla died in 1981 in his native Empordà, leaving thirty-eight volumes (over twenty-five thousand pages) of Obra Completa (Complete Works) published, and many unedited papers that have been published since his death.

== Notability of his work ==
Pla had to live under censorship for much of his life: first during Primo de Rivera's dictatorship, later in Italy and Germany (where he worked as a correspondent during the rise of the Falange), and during Francisco Franco's long rule. Although he initially sympathised with the dictatorship (he wrote in 1940 that it was "in the general interest"), his support only lasted a few months. He soon began to feel scepticism, especially as it became impossible to publish in Catalan. Although he always maintained a moderate political stance to allow him to publish, he was deeply uncomfortable with Franco's tireless censorship (he wrote in one of his diaries that it was "the worst that [I] have known", carried out by "servants of fanaticism"). He hated the regime's disdain for Catalan language and culture and its stubborn inability to turn itself into a democracy, not even a tutelary one.

The most important characteristics of the "Planian" literary style are simplicity, irony, and clarity. Extremely modest and sensitive to ridicule, he detested artifice and empty rhetoric. Throughout his literary life he remained faithful to his own rubric: “the necessity of a clear, precise, and restrained writing”. He maintained a lack of interest in literary fiction, cultivating a dry, apparently simple, practical style, devoted to that which is real. He was an acute observer of reality in its smallest details and he gave a faithful testimony of the society of his time.

His works show a subjective and colloquial vision, anti-literary, though in which he exhibits enormous stylistic effort in calling things by their names and "coming up with the precise adjective", one of his most persistent literary obsessions. An untiring writer, his viewpoint was that life is chaotic, irrational, and unjust, while the longing for equality and revolutions are a delusion that incites worse wrongs than those that it tries to put a stop to. Conservative and rational, he was not inclined to action but to voluptuousness and sensuality: the pleasure of putting the world down on paper. A good conservative, he ate well and drank better (as an old man, whisky made up a good part of his diet), an inveterate smoker, he wore a bowler hat from his youth and later was inseparable from his country beret. He hated banality, cultural affectations (he never included quotations in his works, despite being a reader of the classics) and "people who talk just to hear themselves." So he wrote: "It is more difficult to write than to think, much more difficult: so everyone thinks."

== Works ==
Pla lived a life completely dedicated to writing. The extent of his Obres Completes (Complete Works, 46 volumes and nearly 30,000 pages), which is a collection of all his journals, reports, articles, essays, biographies, novels, and some poems gives an idea of its daunting work schedule while complicating its chronological classification. Many of these pages are the fruit of a hard process of rewriting texts from his youth and weekly articles that were published in Destino for nearly 40 years, as well as hundreds of articles published in different newspapers and an abundance of correspondence.

Thematic classification is not easy either: many articles appeared in different locations with some changes; his thematic repertoire is extensive and, above all; the boundaries between the genres that he developed are not always clear. We can however make an attempt at organizing into genres (the years outlined correspond to the original publication, not to the translation or the reissue of Complete Works).

- Narratives: Coses vistes (1925), Llanterna màgica (1926), Relacions (1927) are books in which narration predominates but foreshadows and hints at other genres which later will be fundamental in his work. Life Embitters (La vida amarga), El carrer estret (1952) and Aigua de mar are later narratives.
- Books of notable events and memories: the book of notable events gives Pla great liberty in the combined use of different genres – the personal diary, description, narration, dialogue, personal reflections, advice to the reader, the portrait and analysis of the customs of people and towns. The Gray Notebook (Catalan: El quadern gris) is a book of notable events that was devoted to Pla. It was not an authentic diary, but a “literary” book of notable events, compiled later. The central themes of the book of notable events are the countryside and geography of Empordà, descriptions of daily life and the narrator-author's obsession with writing.
- Anthropological and folkloric essays: El payés y su mundo (1990) and Les hores (1953).
- Biography: Vida de Manolo (1928), Santiago Rusiñol y su tiempo (1955), Francesc Cambó (1928–1930), Homenots, Retrats de passaport and Tres senyors. Other apparently biographical works are Girona, un llibre de records (1952), Primera Volada, Notes disperses and Notes del capvesprol.
- Travel writing: Les illes, Viatge a la Catalunya Vella, Itàlia i el Mediterrani, Les Amèriques, Sobre París i França, Cartas de lejos and Israel, 1957 (1957)
- Political writing: Madrid. El advenimiento de la República (1933), Crónicas parlamentarias (1933–1934) and (1934–1936)

During the first years of the Francoist regime, due to the complete restriction of the Catalan edition, the following works were published in Spanish: Guía de la Costa Brava (1941), Las ciudades del mar (1942), Viaje en autobús (1942) – considered one of his greatest works, and which proves his skillful grasp of the Spanish language -, Rusiñol y su tiempo (1942), El pintor Joaquín Mir (1944), Un señor de Barcelona (1945) and La huida del tiempo (1945). In 1947, as soon as censorship was lifted, he returned to publishing in Catalan (Cadaqués, one of his most successful books).

After 1956 he started the first series of his Complete Works, which extended to 29 volumes and in which he began to publish his extraordinary portrayals Homenots (Great men). In 1966, Ediciones Destino began the publication of this series. The first volume was an unpublished work, The Gray Notebook, a book of notable events initially written when he was only a little over 20 years of age (although rewritten and substantially expanded later). It was translated into Spanish as El cuaderno gris by Dionisio Ridruejo (in collaboration with his wife, Gloria de Ros) and into English as by Peter Bush. It was considered a before and after in the public consideration of Pla, much more than as a journalist, as the best narrator of contemporary Catalan literature. The success of the criticism and publicity of this work convinced Vergés to continue publishing the complete work, which has reached volume XLVI, with unpublished manuscripts (such as his Notas para un diario, written in the mid-1960s), not free from controversy, by the supposed amendments and manipulations to which Vergés himself was subjected (apparently, in order to suppress certain obscene passages). Later Keerl, his heir, became much more preoccupied with economically exploiting the documents than putting them at the disposal of investigators or the Josep Pla Foundation.

Even though he did not write plays, his life and work inspired various significant works after his death, among which are: Ara que els ametllers ja estan batuts (Now that the almond trees have been knocked down) 1990, in which Josep Maria Flotats creates a portrait of Pla through a collage of his texts. Also La increíble historia del Dr. Floït & Mr. Pla (1997), a production by Els Joglars, which recreates the work of Robert Louis Stevenson where the characters Dr. Jekyll and Mr. Hyde are, respectively, a Catalan industrialist obsessed with wealth and, on the other side, an educated and indulgent writer which personifies the opposed values of industrial bourgeoisie, based on Pla.

His liberal-conservative thought, sceptical and uncompromising, filled with irony and common sense, still resounds today even though it seems to contradict the current cultural establishment the same as it did the previous establishment. His books remain in print, and both Spanish and Catalan critics have unanimously recognised him as one of the greatest writers of the 20th century.

Since 1968, the Josep Pla Award has been given in his honour, for works written and published in Catalan.

== Bibliography ==
- Josep Pla, "Life Embitters", translated by Peter Roland Bush. Archipelago Books, New York, 2015. ISBN 9780914671138
- Josep Pla Foundation: Biography, List of Complete Works, etc. (in Catalan, Spanish, English and French.)
- Espada, Arcadi: Josep Pla. Editorial Omega, Barcelona, 2004, ISBN 978-84-282-1246-5 (in Spanish).

(A biography of the writer, based on the reading and interpretation of his Complete Works).

- Josep Pla, Cristina Badosa, Lletra UOC.
- Valentí Puig, Introduction to The Gray Notebook, NYRB Classics, New York, 2014. ISBN 9781590176719
