= Exiled from Almost Everywhere =

2008 novel by Juan Goytisolo

- First edition (Spanish)
- Author: Juan Goytisolo
- Original title: El exiliado de aquí y allá
- Translator: Peter Bush
- Language: Spanish
- Publisher: Galaxia Gutenberg
- Publication date: 2008
- Publication place: Spain
- English publication date: 2011
- Pages: 152
- ISBN: 978-84-672-3173-1

Exiled from Almost Everywhere (Spanish: El exiliado de aquí y allá) is a 2008 novel by the Spanish writer Juan Goytisolo. It tells the story of a Parisian pervert who ends up in an electronic afterlife where invisible souls communicate with e-mails.

== Reception ==
Alberto Manguel wrote in The Guardian: "Blending Delicado's erotic 16th-century underworld with that other underworld of Alice's mad creatures, Goytisolo creates a nightmarish but coherent universe, in which nothing is what it seems." Manguel continued: "Exiled From Almost Everywhere is perhaps the best work of Goytisolo's later period. ... Under the appearance of a wicked romp, Exiled From Almost Everywhere is a profound work that demands close attention from its readers – who, as the author confesses at the end, must remain bewildered by its Wonderland invention." In Publishers Weekly, the critic wrote that Goytisolo "misfires in this frustrating intellectual exercise", elaborating: "Goytisolo's frenetic and paranoid effort is full of frantic action, but is so unfortunately light on things that appeal to most readers—logic, coherence, characters you might care about—that the whole project reeks of self-indulgence."

== See also ==
- 2008 in literature
- Spanish literature
