= The Gray Notebook =

1966 book by Josep Pla

- Author: Josep Pla
- Original title: El quadern gris
- Translator: Peter Bush
- Language: Catalan
- Publisher: Ediciones Destino
- Publication date: 1966
- Publication place: Spain
- English publication date: 2014
- Pages: 857

The Gray Notebook (Catalan: El quadern gris) is a book by the Spanish writer Josep Pla, published in 1966. It is a reworking of his youthful journal from 1918–1920, when he studied law in Barcelona and wanted to become a writer, with added comments written when he was in his 60s and an established writer. It is Pla's most famous work and was published in English translation by Peter Bush in 2014.
