= Life Embitters =

Book by Josep Pla

- Author: Josep Pla
- Original title: La vida amarga
- Translator: Peter Bush
- Language: Catalan
- Publisher: Ediciones Destino
- Publication date: 1967
- Publication place: Spain
- English publication date: 2015
- Pages: 694

Life Embitters (Catalan: La vida amarga) is a 1967 book by the Spanish writer Josep Pla. The content is a mix of anecdotes, travelogue, historical essays, journalism and memoir, with stories set in various parts of Europe which Pla visited. An English translation by Peter Bush was published by Archipelago Books in 2015.

== Reception ==
Kirkus Reviews wrote in 2015: "Moving around the capitals of Europe in a time of depression and unremitting melancholy, Pla often serves up small moments of perhaps unintentional brilliance[.] ... About all that's missing from this sprawling narrative of vignettes and sharp aperçus is a sense of the author, who sometimes remains hidden; a circumstantial introduction, especially addressing Pla's politics in that most political of times, would have been very useful. Students of Orwell's journalism and of Kapuscinski will be glad to discover Pla, whose melancholy resembles that of his contemporary Stefan Zweig—and for some of the same reasons." The same year, Michael Euade of Catalonia Today wrote that "Pla's portraits are sharp, but not cruel: in part, because he does not except himself." Euade continued: "In his piece on Italian painting, Pla urges his readers to throw away the 'pamphlets that only distort your vision – however handy or abstruse they might be… Set out to see things firsthand, be curious: that's the way to travel.' This is what he did. Combining general comment and the immediacy of close observation, he helps us see the world afresh."
