= José Agustín Goytisolo =

Spanish poet, scholar and essayist (1928–1999)

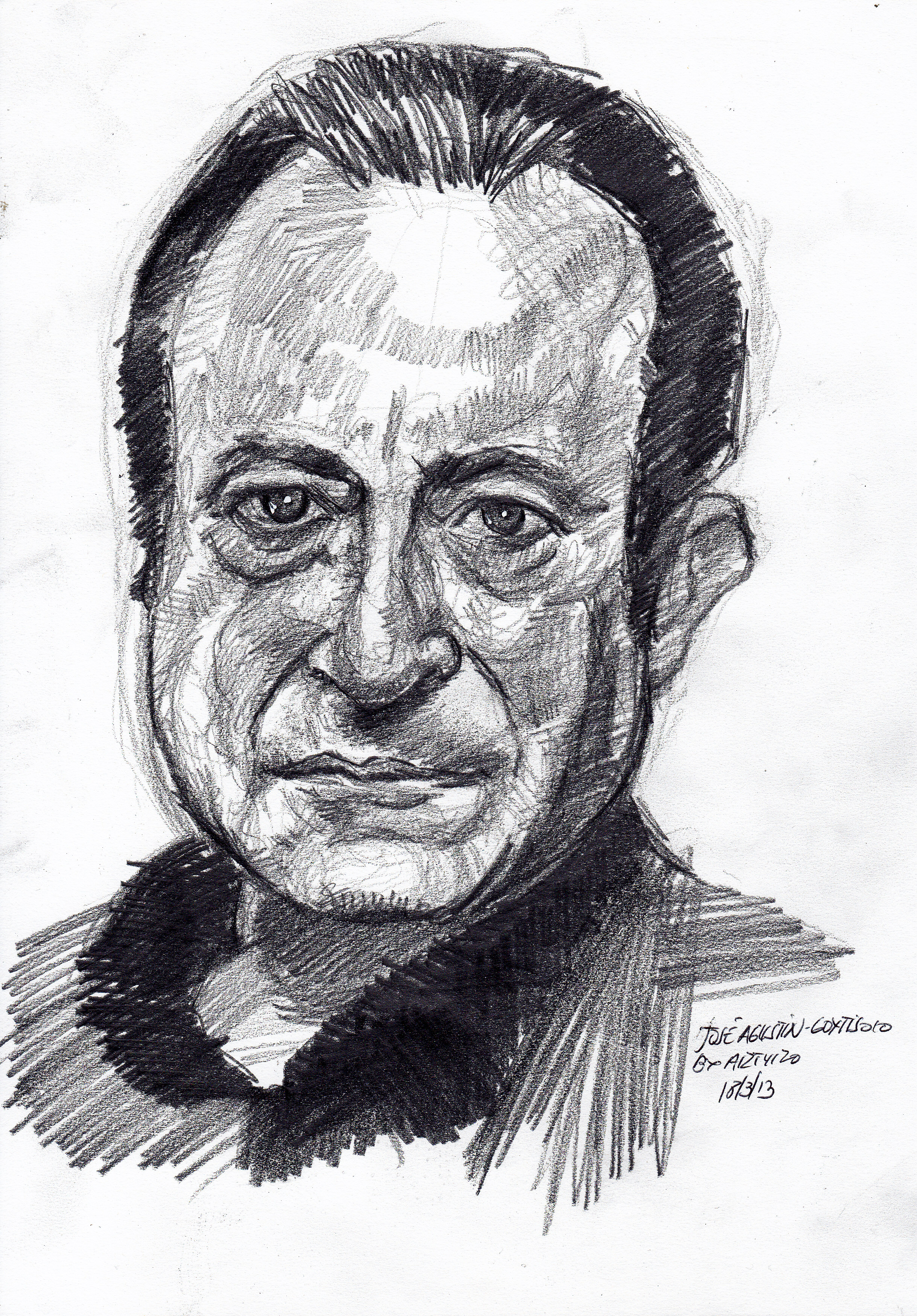
Portrait of José Agustín Goytisolo

José Agustín Goytisolo Gay (13 April 1928 – 19 March 1999) was a Spanish poet, scholar and essayist. He was the brother of Juan Goytisolo and Luis Goytisolo, also writers.

== Biography ==
Born in Barcelona on 13 April 1928, in an upper class Spanish-only speaking family (that is, non Catalan-speaking though he spoke perfect Catalan and translated Catalan poems into other languages), his family was brutally shaken by the death of his mother (Julia Gay) in a Francoist Nationalist bombardment in 1938. José Agustín was especially affected and named his daughter after his lost mother. In Words for Julia, one of his best-known poems (sung by Paco Ibáñez and Los Suaves, among others), he joins the love for both women. In 1993, in the Elegies to Julia Gay, he united all his mother-themed poems. He also deals with his feelings toward his mother in his later books The return (1955) and End of a goodbye (1984).

He started studying Law in the University of Barcelona, and ended his studies in Madrid. He was a member of the so-called "Generation of the 50s", along with writers such as Ángel González, José Manuel Caballero, José Ángel Valente and Jaime Gil de Biedma. They shared a moral or politic commitment and a renewed attention to the lyrics and the language.

In the 1960s and 1970s he was a key contributor to the development of Ricardo Bofill Taller de Arquitectura as a multidisciplinary endeavor. From that experience he drew a collection of poems named Taller de Arquitectura, published in 1976.

According to Manuel Vázquez Montalbán, Goytisolo's poetry was not just an ideological substitute for the capitalism of Francoist Spain, but aspired to build a new humanism:

Tu destino está en los demás
tu futuro es tu propia vida
tu dignidad es la de todos

Translation:

Your destiny is in the others
your future is your own life
your dignity is that of all of us

== Works ==
- El retorno 1955
- Salmos al viento 1956
- Claridad 1959
- Años decisivos 1961
- Algo sucede 1968
- Bajo tolerancia 1973
- Taller de Arquitectura 1976
- Del tiempo y del olvido 1977
- Palabras para Julia 1979
- Los pasos del cazador 1980
- A veces gran amor 1981
- Sobre las circunstancias 1983
- Final de un adiós 1984
- Como los trenes de la noche 1994
- Cuadernos de El Escorial 1995
- Elegías a Julia Gay 1993

== Anthologies ==
- Poetas catalanes contemporáneos 1968
- Poesía cubana de la Revolución 1970
- Antología de José Lezama Lima
- Antología de Jorge Luis Borges
- Los poemas son mi orgullo, poetic anthology. Edition by Carme Riera (Lumen publishing, 2003)

== Translations ==
He was involved in important translations from Italian and Catalan to Spanish. He translated, among others, works by Cesare Pavese, Pier Paolo Pasolini, Salvador Espriu and Pere Quart.

== Prizes ==
- Premio Adonais (1954)
- Premio Boscán (1956)
- Premio Ausias March (1959)

== Personal archive ==
Since 27 February 2002, the Universitat Autònoma de Barcelona has been home to the poet’s documentary archive, held in the Humanities Library. The collection comprises manuscripts, correspondence, a photographic archive, and printed works, donated by the poet’s wife, Asunción Carandell, and their daughter, Julia Goytisolo Carandell.
