= Marks of Identity =

1966 novel by Juan Goytisolo

- First edition
- Author: Juan Goytisolo
- Original title: Señas de identidad
- Translator: Gregory Rabassa
- Language: Spanish
- Publisher: Editorial Joaquín Mortiz
- Publication date: 1966
- Publication place: Spain
- English publication date: 1969
- Pages: 485

Marks of Identity (Spanish: Señas de identidad) is a 1966 novel by the Spanish writer Juan Goytisolo. It was published in Mexico through Editorial Joaquín Mortiz. It is the first installment in the Álvaro Mendiola trilogy, which also includes Count Julian and Juan the Landless.

== Plot summary ==
A man returns to Spain from exile in France and finds himself repelled by Francoist Spain and drawn to the world of Muslim culture. In this novel, Juan Goytisolo, one of Spain's most celebrated novelists, takes the voice of those Spaniards who grew up during the Spanish Civil War, when the caudillo Franco. The narrator discovers, upon his return, that he is torn between the Islamic and European worlds around him, and in the end he finds that none of the two religions give him satisfaction.

The story of Marks of Identity spans from the present time, 1963, when the protagonist Alvaro returns to Spain, after many years of exile in France, which was something he entirely imposed on himself. The parts of the story set in the present are however not the most prominent in this story. The greater part of the novel consists of episodes from Alvaro's younger years: his childhood, days as a student at university, and his time abroad. It is also a story of his family history and the lives of his friends. These are mixed and matched with a variety of seemingly "historical" documents — police reports, falange propaganda leaflets and tourist brochures etc. — and with wholly other chronically correct stories of prison inmates, peasants and workers of that period in time. The story is said to have many autobiographical elements.

The flashbacks start when Alvaro flips through a family photo album while listening to Mozart, and remembers parts of his childhood days in Barcelona. He remembers his harsh Catholic upbringing, how the whole family fled to France during the Spanish Civil War, how they returned under Franco and the revolt that ensued. While attending the funeral of one of his university lecturers, again in present time, he remembers his student days and his coming of age while being introduced to sex, politics and extremist thinkers. On several similar occasions Alvaro is reminded of his life up to that point, and many memories have connections to the political climate in Spain during the most riotous years preceding and following the Spanish Civil War and the Francoist State, like the so-called Events of Yeste.

Alvaro's own history is contrasted with his friend Antonio's - a man recently released from prison on parole, living in Andalusia near the place where they both grew up. This part of the story is clattered with and fractioned by numerous police reports regarding the close watch on politically active extremists.

The story also contains moments of romance, evoked when Alvaro looks through an atlas with his wife, Dolores. It tells of their first meeting in Paris, their travels through Europe together in Switzerland and Italy, of happiness but mostly of troubles and periods of disillusionment. Alvaro also reflects on what has become of his home region, Andalusia in Spain, and the tourist industry that has besieged the coastline, in comparison to the roots of the land, beginning in Cuba and slavery.

== Theme and structure ==
The structure of the story is a somewhat shattered and discontinuous one. There are also whole sections entirely without punctuation or where the author has used blank spaces as an alternative. The story is not hard to read though, once the reader has grown accustomed to the structure.

Marks of Identity is a journey through the landscape of Spanish society in the quarter of a century that follows the Spanish Civil War. It is made by an individual who has been torn between Spain and exile existence and who is constantly haunted by the memories of his family's history and fate. The story includes this individuals view on political repression, economic boom and effects of tourism in a Spain that seems very far from Franco's days.

== See also ==
- 1966 in literature
- Spanish literature
