= Marina Comas =

Spanish Catalan actress

Marina Comas Oller
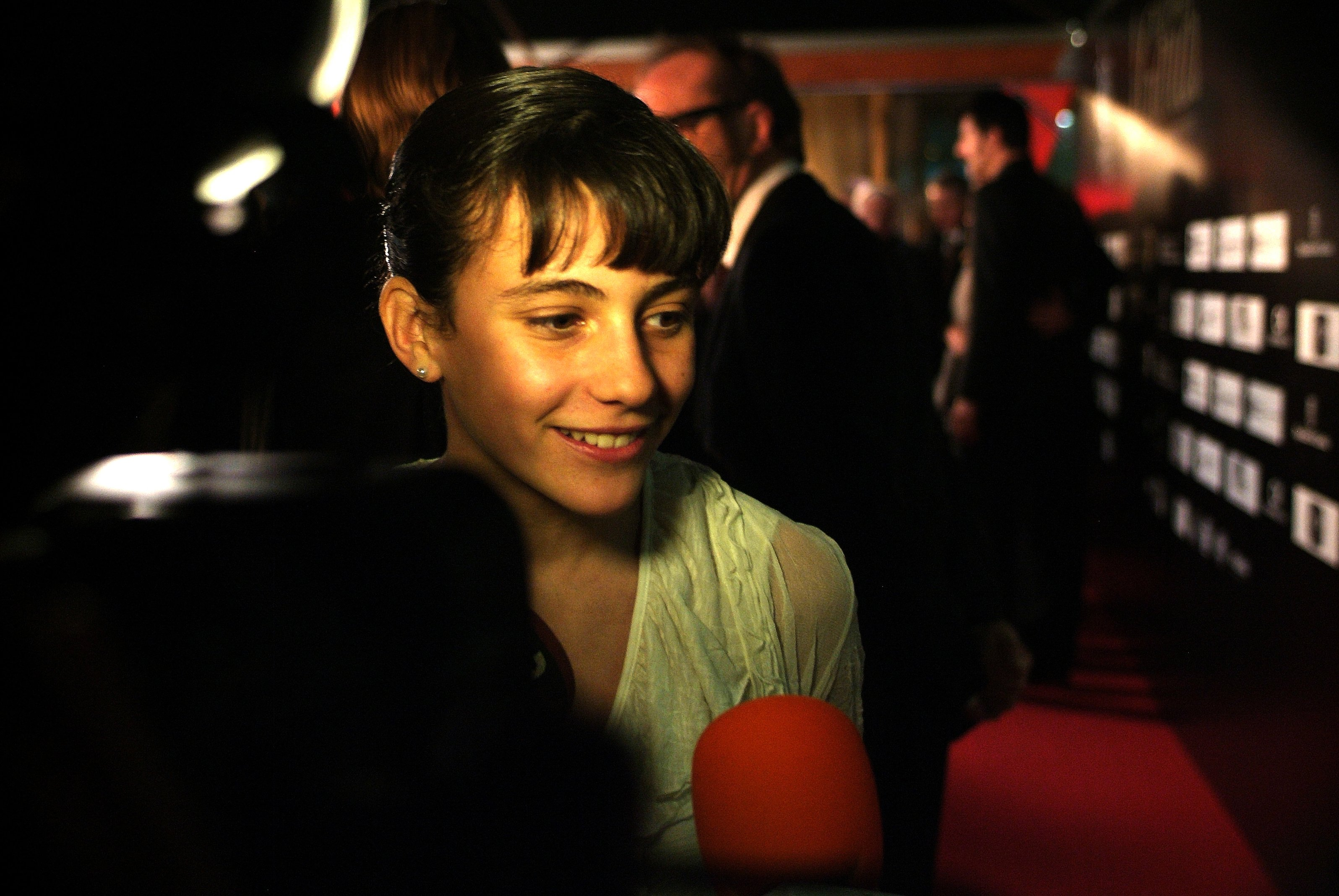
- Marina Comas at the Gaudi Awards in 2011
- Born: 1 September 1996 (age 29); Santa Maria de Besora, Osona
- Occupation: Actress

Marina Comas Oller (born 1 September 1996) is a Spanish Catalan actress. Her credits include the television series Polseres vermelles and the films Black Bread and Els Nens Salvatges.

Comas was born in Santa Maria de Besora, Osona.

Comas was the recipient of the Goya Award, Spain's highest award in the Dramatic Arts.

She made her debut at the age of 14 in the film Black Bread (Pa negre). Thanks to that role she won the Goya Award for best newcomer and the Gaudi Award for best supporting actress. In 2011 she participated in the film Terra baixa. Recently, she starred with Àlex Monner and Albert Baró in the film Los niños salvajes (Els nens salvatges) by Patricia Ferreira, winner of the Golden Biznaga for best film at the Malaga film festival.
