= Jordi Puntí =

Catalan writer

Jordi Puntí i Garriga
- Jordi Puntí
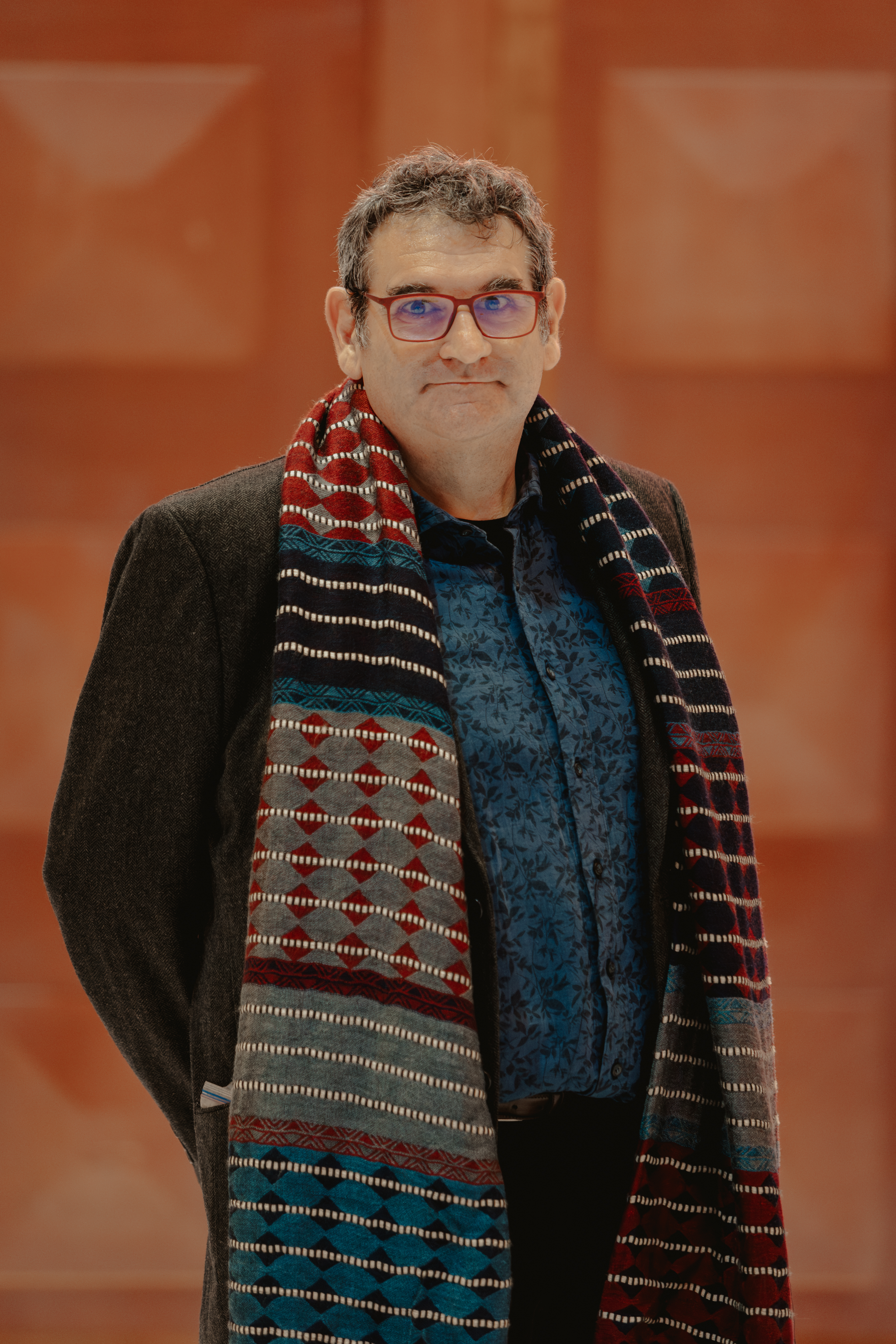
- Puntí in 2023
- Born: 2 July 1967 (age 59); Manlleu, Barcelona
- Education: Romance Philology
- Writing career
- Language: Catalan
- Genre: Novel
- Notable work: Maletes perdudes
- Notable awards: Premi de la Crítica Serra d'Or 1988, Premi de la Crítica de narrativa catalana 2010, Premi Llibreter de narrativa 2010, Premi Lletra d'Or 2010, Premi Joaquim Amat-Piniella 2011, Premi Sant Jordi 2023

Jordi Puntí i Garriga (born 1967 in Manlleu, Barcelona) is a Catalan language writer, columnist, and translator.

== Career ==
Puntí earned a degree in Romance Philology during the year 1991, and has since worked for various publishers (Edicions 62, Quaderns Crema, Columna Edicions) across various media (El País, El Periódico de Catalunya)

His career as an author began with the publication of two books of short stories: Pell d'Armadillo (1988, winner of the Premi de la Crítica Serra d'Or), and Animals tristos (2002). Previously, he had translated the works of other authors, including Paul Auster, Daniel Pennac, and Amélie Nothomb. In 2006, Puntí served as editor of Quadern, a literary supplement published by the newspaper El País.

In 2010, Puntí published Maletes perdudes, which received several awards (Crítica de la narrativa catalana, Lletra d'Or, Premi Llibreter) and has been translated to 16 languages. In 2011, he published Els Castellans, a volume that includes articles previously published in the Catalan magazine L'Avenç.

In 2006, Ventura Pons directed the film Wounded Animals, adapted from Puntí's book Animals tristos (Sad Animals). In 2014, Puntí received a scholarship from the Cullman Center for writers. The scholarship enabled him to spend one year completing research at the New York Public Library, in preparation for a novel based on the figure of Xavier Cugat.

In 2023, Puntí won the Sant Jordi novel Prize with the novel Confeti.

== Published work ==
=== Original works ===
- Pell d'armadillo, (Barcelona: La Magrana), 1988. ISBN 84-8256-565-6
- Animals tristos, (Barcelona: Empúries), 2002. ISBN 84-7596-959-3
- Maletes perdudes, Barcelona: Empúries, 2010. ISBN 978-84-9787-616-2, translated into English by Julie Wark as Lost Luggage, Short Books, 2014. ISBN 978-17-8072-213-9
- Els Castellans, (Barcelona : L'Avenç), 2011. ISBN 978-84-8883-952-7
- Això no és Amèrica (Barcelona: Empúries), 2017 ISBN 978-84-1701-617-3, translated by Julie Wark as This Is Not America, Atria Books, 2019. ISBN 978-1-9821-0471-9
- Tot Messi: Exercicis d'estil (Barcelona: Empúries), 2018. ISBN 978-84-1701-651-7, translated by Peter Bush as Messi: Lessons in Style, Short Books, 2019. ISBN 978-1-7807-2373-0
- Tot Messi i més (Barcelona: Empúries), 2023. ISBN 978-84-1883-396-0

=== Translations ===
- Daniel Pennac, Senyors nens. Barcelona : Empúries, 1998.
- Amélie Nothomb, Higiene de l'assassí. Barcelona : Columna, 1998.
- Paul Auster, Lulu on the bridge. Barcelona : Edicions 62, 1998.
- Paul Auster, Història de la meva màquina d'escriure. Barcelona : Edicions 62, 2002.
