= Luis Goytisolo =

Spanish writer (1935–2026)

The Most Excellent Luis Goytisolo
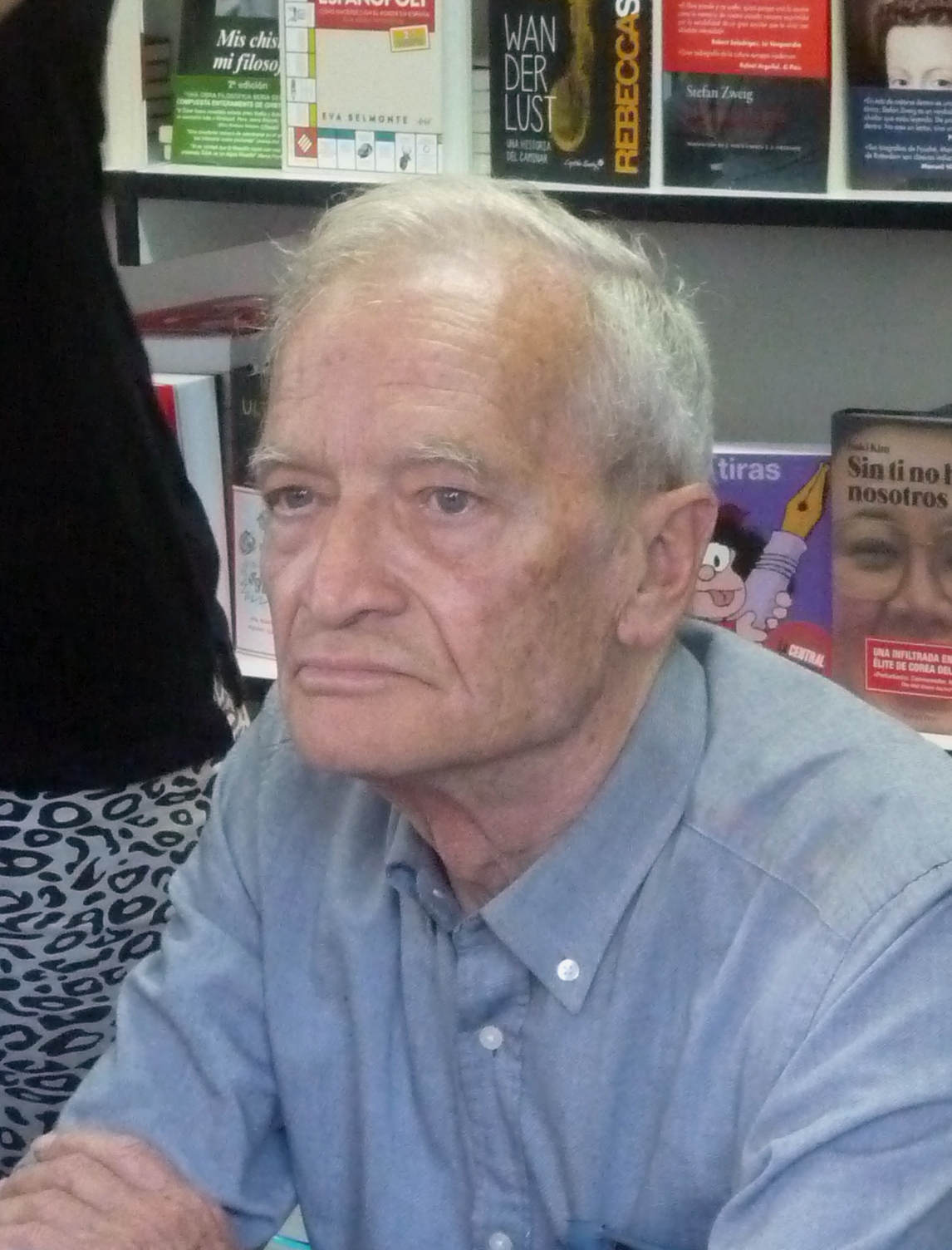
- Goytisolo in 2015
- Born: Luis Goytisolo Gay; 17 March 1935; Barcelona, Spain
- Died: 12 July 2026 (aged 91); Vimbodí i Poblet, Spain
- Education: University of Barcelona
- Occupation: Novelist
- Relatives: Juan Goytisolo (brother); José Agustín Goytisolo (brother)
- Writing career
- Movement: Social realism (1958–1973)

Seat C of the Real Academia Española
- In office 29 January 1995 (Note: Elected on 24 March 1994) – 12 July 2026
- Preceded by: Luis Rosales

Luis Goytisolo Gay (17 March 1935 – 12 July 2026) was a Spanish Catalan writer in the Spanish language. He was best known for his tetralogy Antagony, which was published between 1973 and 1981. Goytisolo was a member of the Real Academia Española.

== Life and career ==
Goytisolo was born in Barcelona on 17 March 1935. He is the younger brother to José Agustín Goytisolo and Juan Goytisolo. He started studying law in 1953 but quit shortly afterwards to dedicate himself to literature and a political struggle against Francoist Spain.

In 1963 he was locked up for four months in the Carabanchel Prison for being a supporter of the Unified Socialist Party of Catalonia/Communist Party of Spain. Part of this period he spent in isolation. During his time in prison he started to write his novel Antagony. He wrote on used pieces of toilet paper.

His tetralogy Antagony is considered by El Mundo to be one of the best novels of the 20th century. In 2012 it was published in a single book. The first book was translated into English in 2017, and a full translation by Brendan Riley was published as a single book in 2022 by Dalkey Archive Press.

In March 2015 Goytisolo donated 57 boxes of his personal archives to the Biblioteca Nacional de España.

He died on 12 July 2026, at the age of 91.

== Awards and honours ==
In 1958 Goytisolo became the inaugural winner of the Premio Biblioteca Breve for his novel Las afueras.

In 1993 he won the Premio Nacional de Narrativa for his book Estatua con palomas.

Goytisolo was elected to seat C of the Real Academia Española on 24 March 1994, he took up his seat on 29 January 1995. He took over the seat from Luis Rosales. In 2015 he criticized the Spanish government for budgets cuts to the Academia, citing the Academia as fundamental to the Spanish language community worldwide.

In 2013 Goytisolo was awarded the Premio Nacional de las Letras Españolas.

== Selected works ==
- Las afueras (1958)
- Antagonía, consisting of: Recuento (1973), Los verdes de mayo hasta el mar (1976), La cólera de Aquiles (1979), Teoría del conocimiento (1981).
  - Antagony, trans. Brendan Riley (Dalkey Archive, 2022): Recounting; The Greens of May Down to the Sea; The Wrath of Achilles; Theory of Knowledge. The first volume, Recounting, was published previously by Dalkey Archive Press in 2017.
- Estela de fuego que se aleja (1984)
- Investigaciones y conjeturas de Claudio Mendoza (1985)
- Estatua con palomas (1993)
- Placer licuante (1999)
- Diario de 360º (2000)
- Liberación (2003)
- Oído atento a los pájaros (2005)
- Coincidencias (2017)
