= Winds of the Night =

Catalan post Spanish Civil War novel

Winds of the Night (Catalan: El vent de la nit) is a novel by the Catalan author and publisher, Joan Sales. It is set in a devastated and impoverished Catalonia under the heel of the Franco dictatorship after the Spanish Civil War. Its narrator is a Catholic priest who undergoes a major crisis of faith.

"Perhaps the worst of war is the peace that follows."

== History of the novel ==
Winds of the Night was originally the fourth part of Joan Sales’ masterwork, Incerta Glòria (Uncertain Glory). The novel was published in 1956 after having been initially rejected by the Francoist censor because it “expressed heretical ideas often in disgusting and obscene language”. Through different editions, Sales continued rewriting and adding to the text, always seeking to escape from the constraints of censorship. In 1971, the greatly expanded definitive version was published, in which the fourth part was entitled Últimes notícies (Latest News). In the 1981 edition of Incerta Glòria, Últimes notícies had become El vent de la nit, novel.la (Winds of the Night, a novel). Finally, in 2012, on the centenary of Sales’ birth, it was published as a separate and self-contained book by his granddaughter, Maria Bohigas. (Note: Since 2005, she has been in charge of Club Editor, the publishing house her grandfather helped set up.)

Maria Bohigas later argued that Sales had recognised that the two novels had quite distinct tones and perspectives (Note: The timespan of Incerta Glòria is the three years of the Spanish Civil War, whereas that of El vent de la nit is a twenty year period up to 1969.) but was loath to separate them. In fact, in an interview not long before he died, Sales said that, what had been the fourth part of Incerta glòria should have been published later as a separate book but “I’m old now and it’s fine as it is”. It is also the case that separating the text into two novels brings Incerta Glòria to a dramatic end (Note: With the chaotic Republican retreat following the collapse of the Aragon front.) and perhaps therefore a more satisfactory conclusion.

== Characters ==
=== Cruells ===
Cruells, a young student for the priesthood at the outbreak of the Civil War, in which he served on the Republican side as a medical adjutant, returns from exile in a French concentration camp for Republican refugees to complete his theological studies and be ordained, but he loses his faith. Cruells having served with the “reds” is an outsider in the Spain of National Catholicism, where bishops give fascist salutes and force Catalan priests to preach in Spanish. (Note: In 1937, the overwhelming majority of Spanish bishops signed a collective letter in support of Franco’s insurrection against the Spanish Second Republic.) Riven by doubt and despair in the face of the bloody horrors of the twentieth century dictatorships (Franco, Stalin, Hitler…), he plumbs the depths of degradation by paying a prostitute for sex and then spending a fortnight with her and her pimp in their sordid flat. He escapes and returns to serve as a priest in the shanty towns on the outskirts of Barcelona, before being dispatched to a rural parish in the Catalan mountains because of his dissenting views.

=== Lamoneda ===
While Cruells was on the losing side in the Spanish Civil War, Lamoneda (Note: La moneda in Catalan translates as 'coin' and perhaps Lamoneda and Cruells are the two sides of the same deranged coin. This was suggested in an interview with Maria Bohigas on Spanish radio: https://www.rtve.es/alacarta/audios/wonderland/wonderland-dissabte-13-juliol-2019/5335641/) worked as a Falangist fifth columnist and agent provocateur working in the Republican zone on behalf of Franco’s insurrectionists. However, he too is also an outsider, not having found his place in Franco’s post-war Spain. He raves about his sexual exploits, his “great” unpublished novels and his supposed friendship with Himmler. (Note: Heinrich Himmler visited Spain in October 1940 to discuss collaboration between the Gestapo and Franco’s police and prepare the meeting between Franco and Hitler in the same month. Lamoneda claims that Himmler recognised him personally as a brilliant secret agent during the Civil War.)

=== Juli Soleràs ===
Soleràs, Sales’s brilliant creation in Uncertain Glory, is an enigmatic and provocative anti-hero, half-philosopher, half-cynic, who serves with the Republicans initially only to cross over to the fascists. As the war comes to a close, he attempts to quit the victors and return to the defeated side. Soleràs does not actually appear as a character in Winds of the Night, but he is very present in conversations between Cruells and Lamoneda. Cruells, who admires Solaràs’ crazed lucidity and considers him as his one and only friend, tries tenaciously to find out what happened to him at the end of the war.

=== Lluís de Broca ===
Lluís, a friend of both Soleràs and Cruells, served with the Republican forces in the Civil War and, following the Republican defeat, left Spain for Chile, where he made a fortune producing pasta for soups. When he returns to Barcelona on visits, he stays in suites at the best hotels. He deceives his wife, Trini.

=== Trini ===
In Uncertain Glory, Cruells was in love with Trini, but he now says of her: “I loved the rebellious Trini of old a thousand times more, the Trini who refused to resign herself to her husband’s infidelities or the opium of a complaisant religion”.

== Synopsis ==
The novel is narrated in the first person by Cruells (also the narrator of the third part of Uncertain Glory). It is structured around a series of meetings between Cruells and Lamoneda: in a café soon after the Civil War, in Lamoneda’s squalid flat during the Barcelona tram strike in 1951, in the priest’s rural parish in the early 1960’s and finally in a hut hidden deep in a remote mountain forest in 1968. Despite himself, Cruells is lured into these meetings by his desire to discover the fate of his friend, Juli Soleràs.

== Themes ==
Sales interlaces the vision of a defeated, humiliated and impoverished Catalonia under the Franco dictatorship with a priest’s loss of faith and his descent into the heart of darkness. Despite the horrors of the Civil War, Cruells (and in his own way Lamoneda) is nostalgic for those years: “And my guilty heart longs for that war and that woman. And my guilty heart still longs for my lost youth; I know I will never experience life like that again. ……. I was only fourteen but I will always remember that marvellous aroma of resurrection and hope.”

== Historical references in the novel ==
- At the beginning of the novel, Cruells recounts the execution of Lluís Companys as told to him by a nun (Companys’ sister). Companys had been president of the Generalitat of Catalonia during the Civil War. Arrested by the Gestapo in France, where he had sought refuge in 1939, he was extradited and executed in the Montjuïc castle after a very brief military trial in 1940.
- The tram strike of 1951 was a protest of the people of Barcelona against a plan to raise fares by up to 40%. For a fortnight, people refused to use public transport and made their journeys on foot. Cruells describes it as a witness: “I was there on other business; I suddenly noticed that buses were empty, shops were closed, and that the masses, who should have been in their factories, workshops, or offices, were crammed into the city centre. They walked in silence; the only sound was the tramping of thousands of feet…” It was first strike since the Civil War and was successful in so far as the fare hikes were withdrawn.
- On 11 May 1966, 130 Catholic priests protested in their cassocks against the torturing of a student at the police headquarters in Via Laietana in Barcelona. The demonstration was brutally repressed by the police. Cruells recounts: the police “hit us in the face with these (truncheons) or their fists, and some people were knocked unconscious to the ground, where they continued being kicked. We had pledged in the cloisters that we would not run away, whatever happened, and we kept our word; we let them hit us, we didn’t budge or offer any resistance.”

== English translation ==
In 2017, Peter Bush translated the novel into English. In his afterword to Winds of the Night, historian Paul Preston stated that the translation "beautifully captured" the "exquisite prose" of the original novel. Peter Bush also translated Uncertain Glory in 2014.
