= Count Julian (novel) =

1970 novel by Juan Goytisolo

- First edition
- Author: Juan Goytisolo
- Original title: Reivindicación del conde don Julián
- Translator: Helen Lane
- Language: Spanish
- Publisher: Editorial Joaquín Mortiz
- Publication date: 1970
- Publication place: Spain
- English publication date: 1974
- Pages: 242

Count Julian (Spanish: Reivindicación del conde don Julián) is a 1970 novel by the Spanish writer Juan Goytisolo. The title refers to Julian, count of Ceuta. The book was published in Mexico by Editorial Joaquín Mortiz. It is the second installment in the Álvaro Mendiola trilogy, which also includes Marks of Identity and Juan the Landless.

Don Julián (a mythical figure) is one of the villains of traditional Spanish history, who facilitated the Moorish (Islamic) conquest of Spain in the eighth century, to avenge the alleged sexual abuse of one of his daughters by Rodrigo, the last Visigothic king. Goytisolo's title proclaims that this book intends to defend or vindicate Don Julián: that we should celebrate what he did, rather than condemn him.

The book is often characterized as anti-Catholic and anti-Spanish, at least of Spain as it viewed and celebrated itself during the Francoist State. (Until Francisco Franco's death in 1975, the novel could not be published in Spain.) The Roman philosopher Seneca, a national hero, is singled out for particularly harsh criticism and satire. In an amusement park the narrator enters a large model of the vagina of Isabel la Católica, Spain's most Catholic queen. He delights in Don Julián's facilitating the rape of Spanish virgins by the invading Moors. At one point he considers how to infect the whole country with syphilis. The protagonist, who lives in Morocco (as did Goytisolo), seeks revenge on Spain, the country that cast him out, by destroying its literature, religion, cultural beliefs, myths, and language.

Mario Vargas Llosa said that Count Julian is "the most moving of Goytisolo's works."

== See also ==
- 1970 in literature
- Spanish literature
