= Institut Màrius Torres =

Màrius Torres
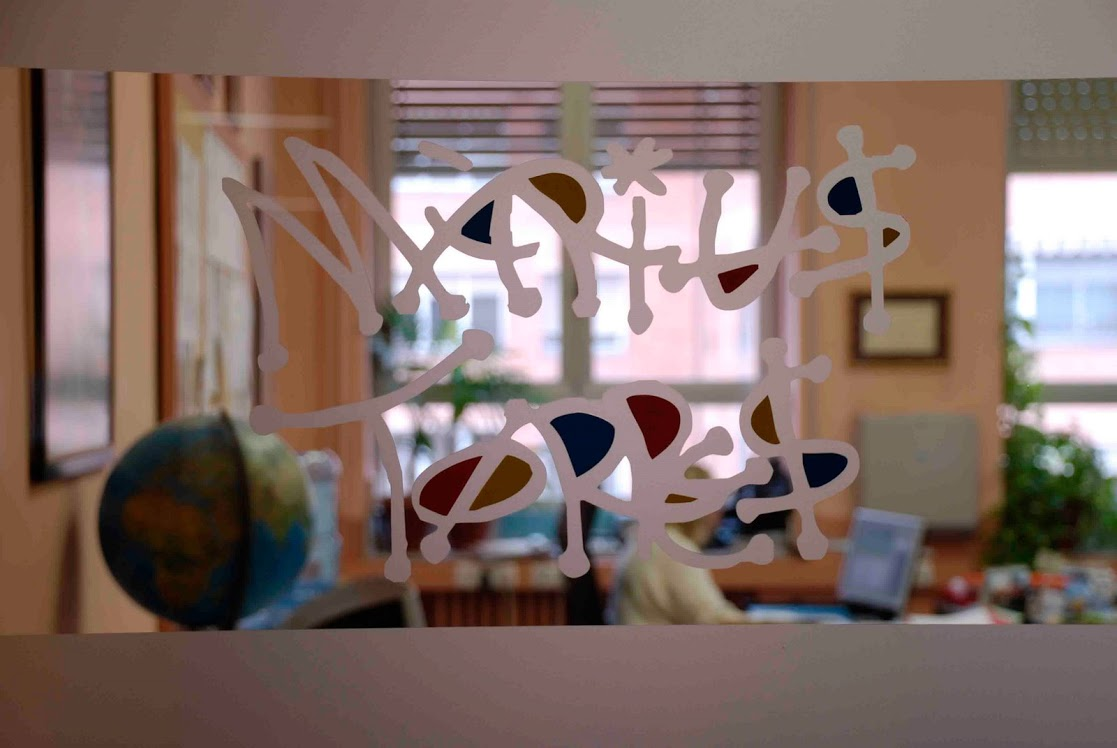
- School's logo

Location
- Carrer Narcís Monturiol, 2; 25002 Lleida, Catalonia; Spain
- Coordinates: 41.607096°N 0.616898°E

Information
- Type: State secondary
- Grades: 7–12
- Affiliation: Generalitat of Catalonia

The Màrius Torres Secondary School (Catalan: Institut Màrius Torres; full name: Instituto de Educación Secundaria Ies Marius Torres) is one of the oldest state secondary schools in Catalonia. It is located in the city of Lleida and it is possible to study the Spanish secondary educational programs (Spanish: Educación Secundaria Obligatoria and Bachillerato).
