= Juan the Landless =

1975 novel by Juan Goytisolo

- First edition
- Author: Juan Goytisolo
- Original title: Juan sin tierra
- Translator: Helen Lane
- Language: Spanish
- Publisher: Seix Barral
- Publication date: 1975
- Publication place: Spain
- English publication date: 1977
- Pages: 321

Juan the Landless (Spanish: Juan sin tierra) is a 1975 novel by the Spanish writer Juan Goytisolo. Published by Seix Barral, it marked Goytisolo's return to a Spanish publisher following the death of Francisco Franco. It is the last installment in the Álvaro Mendiola trilogy, which also includes Marks of Identity and Count Julian.

== See also ==
- 1975 in literature
- Spanish literature
