= Emili Teixidor =

Catalan writer

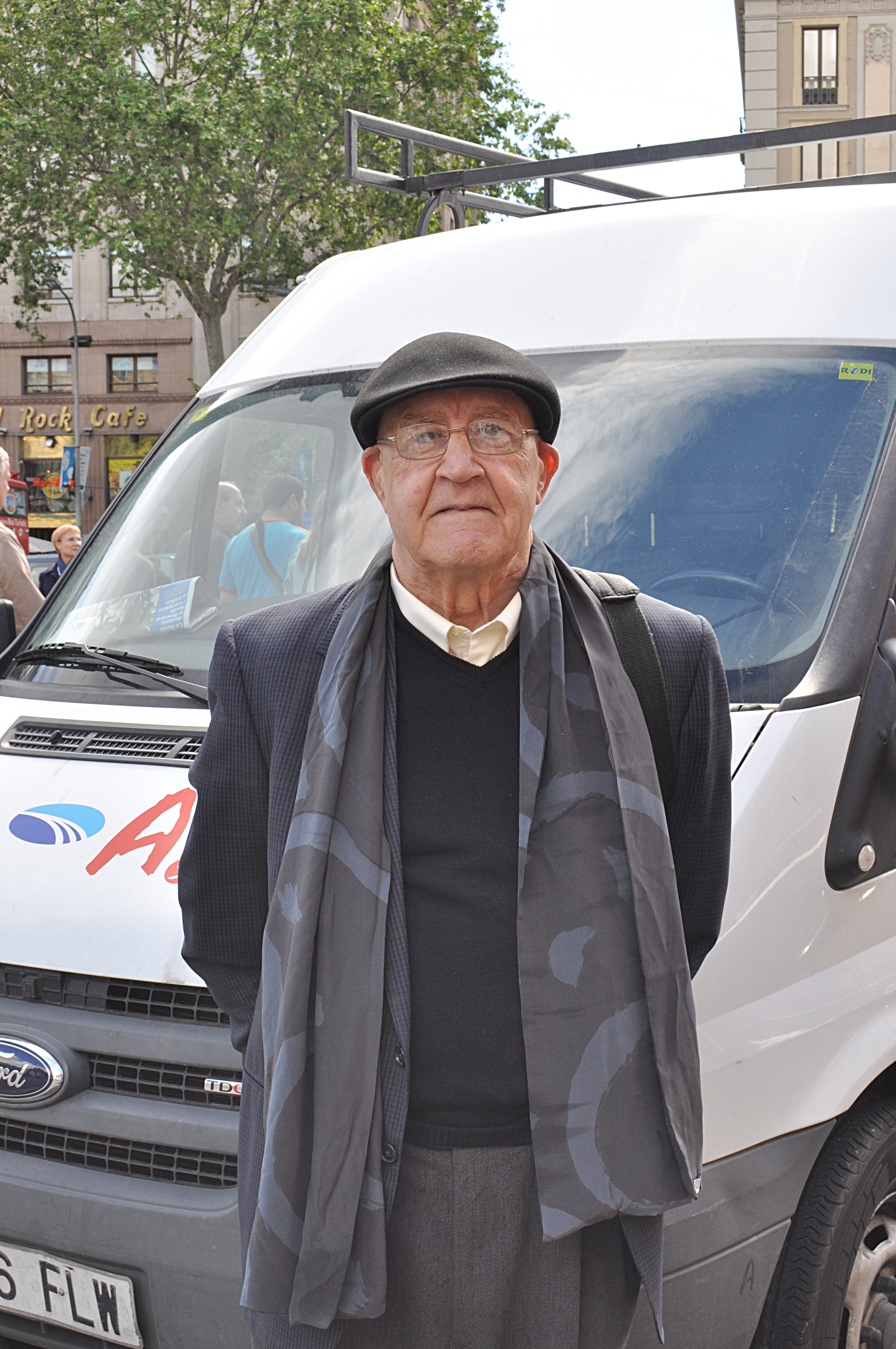
- Born: Emili Teixidor i Viladecàs; 22 December 1932; Roda de Ter, Catalonia, Spain
- Died: 19 June 2012 (aged 79); Barcelona, Catalonia, Spain
- Occupations: Teacher; pedagogue; writer; journalist

Emili Teixidor i Viladecàs (22 December 1932 – 19 June 2012) was a Catalan writer, journalist and pedagogue. He wrote over thirty novels, mainly for children and teenagers, but he is perhaps best known for his acclaimed adult novel, Black Bread (Catalan: Pa negre), which inspired a film of the same name.

== Biography ==
Emili Teixidor was born on 22 December 1932 in the town of Roda de Ter in the Osona region of Catalonia. His mother, Filomena Viladecàs i Planas, was a worker in the local textile factory, and his father, Jaume Teixidó i Corominas, drove a bus. The family’s history was marked by the Spanish Civil War and the subsequent repression. Following the Francoist victory and the defeat of the Spanish Republic, Teixidor’s father was imprisoned by the fascists. Unlike so many other Catalans who opposed Franco, he was fortunate to be released from prison. An uncle, Josep Teixidor, rather than risk imprisonment or execution, fled to exile in Mexico.

=== Education ===
Emili Teixidor attended the local school, which had mixed age groups, and he began a lifelong friendship with Miquel Martí i Pol, who was four years older. However, unlike Martí i Pol, who had to leave school at the age of 12 in order to work in a textile factory, Teixidor was able to continue his education. After his father’s death in 1948, he was granted a scholarship and he moved to Barcelona, where he studied to be a teacher and then took a degree in law, to be followed by another in philosophy and literature, and finally one in journalism.

=== Teaching ===
After gaining his diploma in teaching training, he returned to the Osona as a teacher. However, in 1958 he cofounded the educationally progressive school, Patmos, in Barcelona. He was to be its head teacher until 1975.

=== Writing ===
Emili Teixidor began writing for young people in the late 1960’s in the belief that there was a need for novels which did not express the ideology of the Franco regime and the Catholic church and moreover were also written in Catalan. His historical novel The Firebird (Catalan: L’ocell de foc), published in 1972, was to become a popular classic. His first book for adults was a short story collection, Sic transit Glòria Swanson in 1979.

=== Journalism ===
Teixidor edited a French film magazine in Paris from 1976 to 1977. He then returned to the post-Franco Barcelona, where he worked as a newspaper columnist and television and radio scriptwriter.

=== Death ===
Teixidor died of cancer in Barcelona at the age of 78 in 2012.

== Bibliography and awards ==
- 1967 El soldat plantat (The Abandoned Soldier), young adult and teen novel.
- 1967 Les rates malaltes (The Sick Rats), young adult and teen novel, Joaquim Ruyra Award.
- 1969 Dídac, Berta i la màquina de lligar boira (Didac, Berta and the Machine to Tie up Fog), children’s novel. Translated into Spanish.
- 1972 L’ocell de foc (The Firebird), young adult and teen novel. 1993: translated into Spanish.
- 1977 Sempre em dic Pere (My Name is always Peter), children’s novel. 1997: translated into Spanish.
- 1979 Sic transit Glòria Swanson, short stories, Premi de la Crítica Serra d’Or (The Serra d’Or Critics’ Award). 1983: translated into Spanish.
- 1980 El Príncep Alí (Prince Ali), young adult and teen novel, Premi de Literatura de la Generalitat de Catalunya (The Generalitat of Catalonia’s Literary Award). 1997: translated into Spanish.
- 1983 Frederic, Frederic, Frederic, young adult and teen novel. 1991: translated into Spanish.
- 1986 First volume in the series of stories about Ranquet, En Ranquet i el tresor (Ranquet and the Treasure), children’s novel. 1987: translated into Spanish; 1991: translated into French, finalist in the Europe Award in Poitiers; 1989: Mention of Honour in the Pier Paolo Vergiero Award from the University of Padua.
- 1986 Cada tigre té una jungla (Every Tiger has a jungle), children’s novel. 1989: translated into Spanish.
- 1988 The first volume of the series of cases investigated by Inspector Garrofa, El crim de la Hipotenusa (The Crime of the Hypotenuse), children’s novel. 1989: translated into Spanish; 1995: translated into Italian.
- 1988 Retrat d’un assassí d’ocells (Portrait of a Bird Killer), novel. 1989: translated into Spanish.
- 1990 Premi Atlàntida de la Nit de l’Edició (Publisher’s Night Atlantis Award) for the best presenter or director of an audiovisual programme in Catalan for Mil paraules (A Thousand Words) from 1990 to 1994.
- 1990 Creu de Sant Jordi (Cross of Saint George Award) by the Catalan Government.
- 1992 Les Ales de la Nit (The Wings of Night), young adult and teen novel. Translated into Portuguese.
- 1994 Cor de roure (Heart of Oak), young adult and teen novel, Premi de la Crítica Serra d’Or (The Serra d’Or Critics’ Award). 1995: translated into Spanish.
- 1996 L’amiga més amiga de la formiga Piga (Piga the Ant’s Very Best Friend), the first volume in this series of children’s stories. Spanish Ministry of Culture Award, honours diploma, awarded the gold medal and international selection by the IBBY (International Board on Books for Young People). Selected by the Spanish IBBY as candidate for the International Andersen Award.
- 2000 El llibre de les mosques (The Book of Flies), novel, Premi Sant Jordi (Saint George’s Award).
- 2001 Amics de mort (Deadly Friends), young adult and teen novel. 2003: translated into Spanish.
- 2003 Pa negre (Black Bread), novel, Premis de la crítica Joan Crexells, Lletra d’Or, Maria Àngels Anglada i Nacional de Literatura (The Joan Crexells Critics’ Award, The Gold Letter, The Maria Àngels Anglada and The National Literature Awards). 2004: translated into Spanish; 2008: translated into Greek. 2016: translated into English
- 2003 En Ring 1-2-3 i el món nou (Ring 1-2-3 and the New World), first volume of this series of children’s stories, Apel· Mestres Award. Translated into Spanish.
- 2003 La rosa, la roca i el llop (The Rose, the Rock and the Wolf), young adult and teen novel.
- 2005 Quina gana que tinc! (How Hungry I Am!), children’s story. 2007: translated into Spanish.
- 2005 The Germán Sánchez Ruipérez Foundation Award for the best newspaper article on reading.
- 2006 Laura Sants, novel.
- 2006 Premi Trajectòria (The Career Award) from the Catalan Book Week.
- 2007 La lectura i la vida (Reading and Life), essay. Translated into Spanish.
- 2010 Els convidats (The Guests), novel.
- 2011 Premi dels escriptors catalans (The Catalan Writers’ Award) for his entire literary career.
