= Joan Sales i Vallès =

Catalan writer, translator and publisher

- Born: 19 November 1912; Barcelona
- Died: 12 November 1983 (aged 70); Barcelona
- Burial place: Siurana (Priorat)
- Monuments: Mirador de Joan Sales (Barcelona) https://bcnsostenible.cat/web/punt/mirador-de-joan-sales
- Occupations: Catalan writer, publisher and translator
- Notable work: Uncertain Glory, Winds of the Night

Joan Sales i Vallès (1912–1983) was a Catalan writer, translator and publisher, who promoted Catalan culture under the Franco dictatorship. His best-known novel and major testament is Uncertain Glory (Catalan: Incerta Glòria).

== Biography ==
Joan Sales was born on 19 November 1912 in Barcelona. His father was originally from Vallclara (Conca de Barbarà) and his mother from Terrassa. Breaking with the conservative and traditionalist politics of his family, (Note: Sales in his Cartes a Màrius Torres mentions that he and his brother Francesc were the only “republicans” in the family. The others were undoubtedly very close to the Regionalist League of Catalonia (Catalan: Lliga Regionalista) and its continuation. An uncle on Joan Sales’s mother’s side, Joan Vallès i Pujals, was a member of that party and held a number of posts including city councillor, president of the Provincial Deputation of Barcelona and senator for Girona. With the outbreak of the Spanish Civil War, he went over to the Francoists.) Sales became politically active at a young age and at the age of 15 he was imprisoned for three months for protesting against the Primo de Rivera dictatorship. He was involved in the foundation of the Partit Comunista Català in 1928 and it was here that he met his future wife Núria Folch i Pi. The PCC joined the Bloc Obrer i Camperol in 1931. However, Sales soon left the BOC, disillusioned with what he felt to be the party's rigid discipline and its retreat from its Catalan roots. (Note: Another factor in Sales’s disenchantment may have been the testimony he heard from Andreu Nin regarding the reality of the Stalinist regime in the USSR. After Nin’s expulsion from Moscow and return to Barcelona in 1930, he and Sales met socially on a number of occasions. Nin, while describing Stalin as a “monster”, defended the previous Leninist regime. However, Sales recounts in his Cartes a Màrius Torres that he saw a clear continuation between the two.) In 1932, Sales obtained a law degree and also became one of the first officially recognised teachers of Catalan.

With the outbreak of the Spanish Civil War, Sales enrolled in the Catalan Military Academy (Catalan: Escola de Guerra) and, as an officer, was sent first to the anarchist Durruti Column (Note: In the Durruti column the officers were given the title of technicians or technical experts (Catalan: tècnics). Sales became increasingly disenchanted with his role as a “technician” in the column and he later described the five months he spent them as “hellish”. They in turn became more and more dissatisfied with him. He recounts in his book, Cartes a Màrius Torres, that the anarchist leading committee held a meeting to decide on his fate, where it was discussed whether to shoot him or expel him. After a long and heated debate, they opted for the latter.) in Madrid and then to a militarised battalion on the Aragon front. In 1938, he was arrested and imprisoned for several weeks by the Communist-controlled Military Investigation Service (described by his wife as the local version of the GPU) for not reporting two of his brothers who, having been called up for military service, had then disappeared. In fact, all the male members of the Sales family were detained including a German brother-in-law. Three of the six brothers in the family were to die of typhus, which was rife in the concentration camp where they were being held. Sales himself was acquitted of all charges and returned to the front. He was sent to a column which was among the last to resist Franco's troops at the Balaguer bridgehead. He was then involved in a rearguard action protecting the chaotic Republican military and civilian retreat. In the final days of the war, he was promoted to the post of major.

Following the defeat of the Spanish Republic at the hands of the fascists, he was one of the last to take the road to exile and cross into France at the Col d’Ares. (Note: Sales recounts in Uncertain Glory that when the Republican troops arrived at the frontier pass and looked back to the Catalan villages and towns going up in smoke, they all (including the anarchists) sang Virolai, the hymn to Our Lady of Montserrat.) He was to spend nine years in exile: in France, (Note: In France, Sales and other Catalan exiles sought permission to form a Catalan military unit to fight on the side of the Allies against Nazi Germany. However, the only option he was given was to join the French Foreign Legion.) the Dominican Republic and Mexico, where he worked as a typesetter. On his return to Catalonia in 1948, he began writing his great work, Uncertain Glory. He also dedicated himself to publishing books in Catalan, as far as that was possible within the constraints of Francoist censorship.

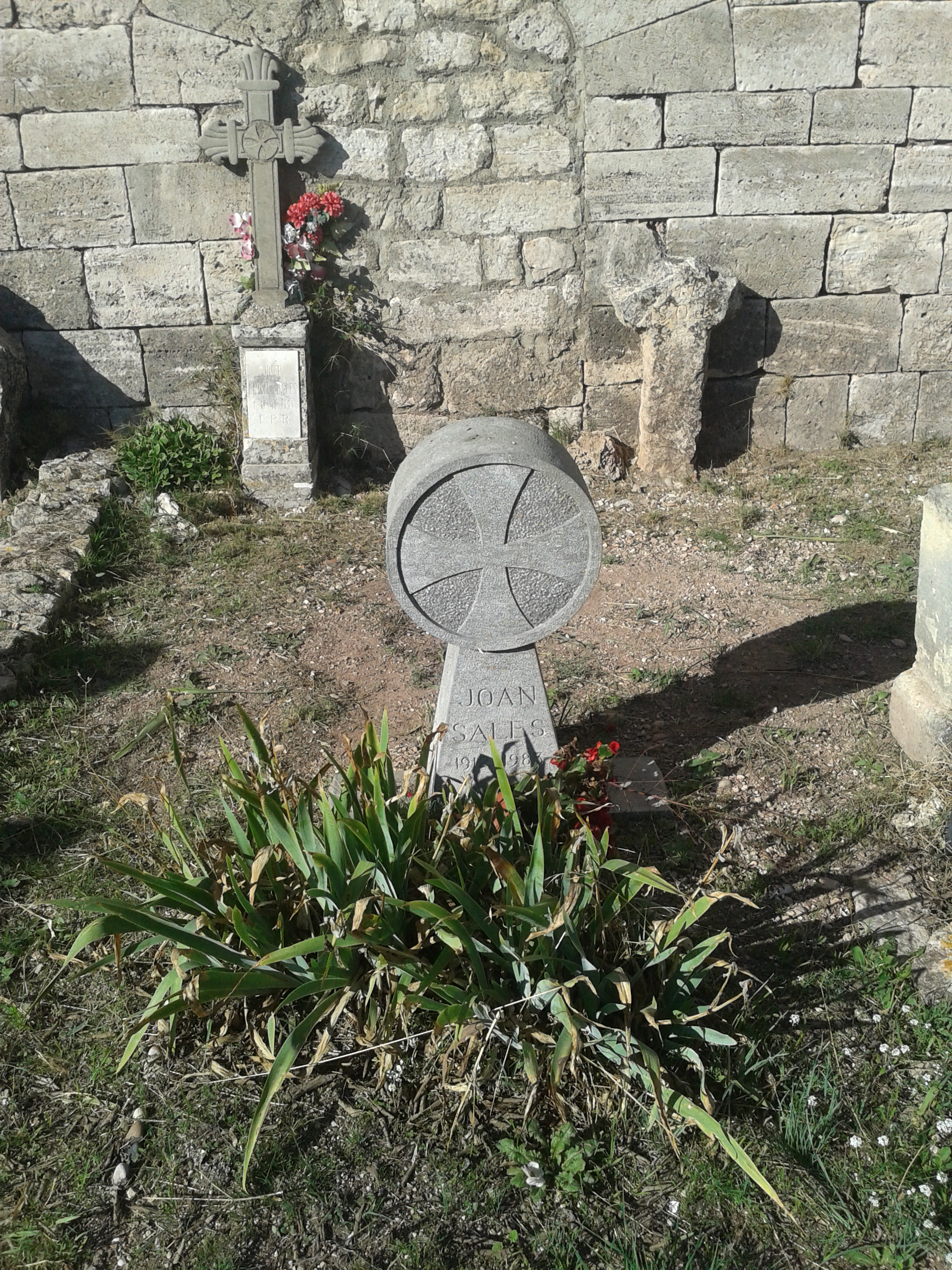
Joan Sales's gravestone

Joan Sales died in Barcelona in 1983 and was buried in Siurana, Priorat. His wife, Núria Folch, who died in 2010, was buried beside him. They were survived by their daughter, Núria Sales i Folch, a historian.

== Publisher and translator ==
As a publisher, Sales founded Club Editor and was actively involved in keeping Catalan culture and literature alive during the Franco dictatorship. He published a number of classics of Catalan literature: most notably, In Diamond Square (Note: Also translated as The Time of the Doves and The Pigeon Girl.)(Catalan:La plaça del Diamant) by Mercè Rodoreda and The Doll's Room (Catalan: Bearn o la sala de les nines) by Llorenç Villalonga. He also published the poems of his great friend, Màrius Torres and a volume of their correspondence during the Civil War and the period of exile, Cartes a Màrius Torres. As a translator, Sales translated authors such as Dostoevsky, (Note: By coincidence, Andreu Nin (see Notes 2) also translated Dostoevsky into Catalan.) Kazantzakis and Mauriac into Catalan. The dostoevskian influence is evident in his great novel, Uncertain Glory.

== Politics ==
Sales was a convinced Christian Democrat and committed Catalan nationalist. Following his return from exile, he joined the Democratic Union of Catalonia (Catalan: Unió Democràtica de Catalunya). He explained that he became a Catholic during the Civil War, having seen so many corpses and that the UDC was the only party without any blood on its hands. He conceived his masterpiece, Uncertain Glory, as a testament to his dead comrades: "I sought to bear witness to that which I had experienced, against the black lie - the Falangists - and also the red lie - the Falangists first and then the Communists."

== Works ==
- 1950 Rondalles escollides de Guimerà, Casaponce i Alcover (illustrated by Elvira Elias)
- 1951 Rondalles gironines i valencianes (illustrated by Elvira Elias)
- 1952 Rondalles d'ahir i avui (illustrated by Montserrat Casanova)
- 1952 Viatge d'un moribund
- 1953 Rondalles escollides de Ramon Llull, Mistral i Verdaguer (illustrated by d'Elvira Elias, preface from Carles Riba)
- 1956 Uncertain Glory (Incerta glòria) 1971: uncensored, revised and expanded.
- 1972 En Tirant lo Blanc a Grècia, òpera bufa
- 1976 Cartes a Màrius Torres
- 1983 Winds of the Night (El vent de nit)
- 1986 Cartes de la guerra
