= Juan Goytisolo =

Spanish writer and poet (1931–2017)

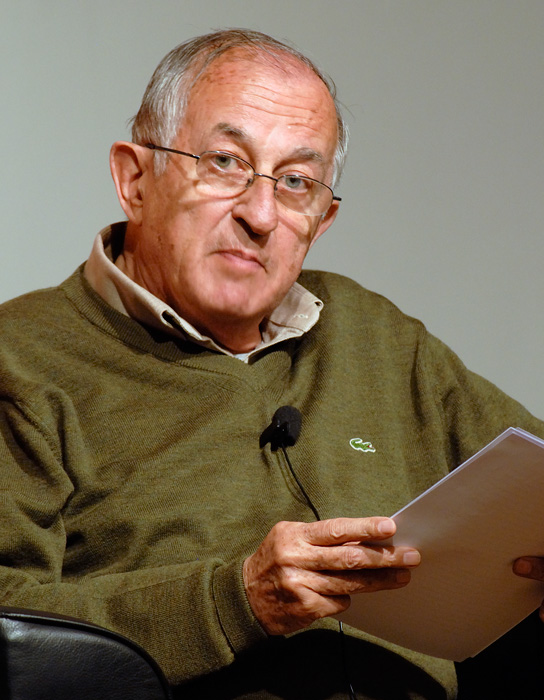
- Juan Goytisolo in 2008
- Born: Juan Goytisolo Gay; 6 January 1931; Barcelona, Spain
- Died: 4 June 2017 (aged 86); Marrakesh, Morocco
- Occupations: Novelist; short story writer; poet; essayist
- Spouse: Monique Lange
- Relatives: Luis Goytisolo, José Agustín
- Writing career
- Period: 1954–2017
- Notable work: Count Julian
- Notable awards: Miguel de Cervantes Prize; 2014
- Movement: Post-Modernism

For decades, my name was more popular in police stations than bookshops,
and I do not mean to compliment the literary awareness of Spanish policemen.

— Juan Goytisolo

Juan Goytisolo Gay (6 January 1931 – 4 June 2017) was a Spanish poet, essayist, and novelist. He lived in Marrakesh from 1997 until his death in 2017. He was considered Spain's greatest living writer at the beginning of the 21st century, yet he had lived abroad since the 1950s. On 24 November 2014 he was awarded the Cervantes Prize, the most prestigious literary award in the Spanish-speaking world.

== Background ==
Juan Goytisolo was born to an upper class family. He claimed that this level of status, accompanied by the cruelties of his great-grandfather and the miserliness of his grandfather (discovered through the reading of old family letters and documents), was a major reason for his joining the Communist party in his youth. His father was imprisoned by the Republican government during the Spanish Civil War, while his mother, Julia Gay, was killed in the first Francoist air raid of Barcelona in 1938. He attended a Jesuit school in Barcelona after the Civil War, where he began writing fiction as a teenager. He later attended law school at the University of Madrid and the University of Barcelona, but left without earning a degree.

== Career ==
After law studies, Goytisolo published his first novel, The Young Assassins, in 1954. In 1956 he performed six months of military service in Mataró, which inspired some of his early stories. His deep opposition to Francisco Franco led him into exile in Paris later that same year, where he worked as a reader for Gallimard. In the early 1960s, he was a friend of Guy Debord. From 1969 to 1975 he worked as a literature professor in universities in California, Boston, and New York. Breaking with the realism of his earlier novels, he published Marks of Identity (1966), Count Julian (1970), and Juan the Landless (1975). During his tenure as a professor he also worked on his controversial Spanish translation of the works of José María Blanco White, which he published in part as a critique of Francoist Spain. As with all his works, they were banned in Spain until after Franco's death.

In 2012, Goytisolo confirmed that he was finished writing novels, saying he had nothing more to write and that it was better he kept quiet. He continued, however, to publish essays and some poetry.

Count Julian (1970, 1971, 1974) takes up, in an act of outspoken defiance, the side of Julian, count of Ceuta, a man traditionally castigated as the ultimate traitor in Spanish history. In Goytisolo's own words, he imagines "the destruction of Spanish mythology, its Catholicism and nationalism, in a literary attack on traditional Spain." He identifies himself "with the great traitor who opened the door to Arab invasion." The narrator in this novel, an exile in North Africa, rages against his beloved Spain, forming an obsessive identification with the fabled Count Julian, dreaming that, in a future invasion, the ethos and myths central to Hispanic identity will be totally destroyed.

== Family ==
Goytisolo was married to the publisher, novelist and screenwriter Monique Lange, whom he met in Paris in the 1950s. Lange was related to Emmanuel Berl and the philosopher Henri Bergson. Goytisolo and Lange had something of an open relationship, and he slept with men but "love[d] only Monique". They married in 1978 and lived together until she died in 1996. After her death, he was noted as saying their once-shared Paris apartment had become like a tomb. In 1997 he moved to Marrakesh, where he died in 2017.

His brothers José Agustín Goytisolo (1928–1999) and Luis Goytisolo (1935–2026) were also writers.

== Works ==
=== Fiction ===
- The Young Assassins (Juegos de manos) (1954)
- Duelo en el Paraíso (1955)
- El mañana efímero (trilogy)
  - El circo (1957)
  - Fiestas (1958)
  - La Resaca (1958)
- Para vivir aquí (1960)
- La isla (1961)
- La Chanca (1962)
- Fin de fiesta. Tentativas de interpretación de una historia amorosa (1962)
- Álvaro Mendiola (trilogy)
  - Marks of Identity (Señas de identidad, 1966)
  - Count Julian (Reivindicación del conde don Julián, 1970)
  - Juan the Landless (Juan sin Tierra, 1975)
- Makbara (1980)
- Paisajes después de la batalla (1985)
- Las virtudes del pájaro solitario (1988)
- La cuarentena (1991)
- El sitio de los sitios (1995)
- Las semanas del jardín (1997)
- The Marx Family Saga (1999), (La saga de los Marx, 1993)
- State of Siege (2002)
- Telón de boca (2003)
- A Cock-Eyed Comedy (2005) (Carajicomedia, 2000)
- Exiled from Almost Everywhere (El exiliado de aquí y allá, 2008)

=== Essays ===
- Problemas de la novela (1959). Literature.
- Furgón de cola (1967).
- España y los españoles (1979). History and politics.
- Crónicas sarracinas (1982).
- El bosque de las letras (1995). Literature.
- Disidencias (1996). Literature.
- De la Ceca a la Meca. Aproximaciones al mundo islámico (1997).
- Cogitus interruptus (1999).
- El peaje de la vida (2000). With Sami Nair.
- Landscapes of War: From Sarajevo to Chechnya (2000).
- El Lucernario: la pasión crítica de Manuel Azaña (2004).

=== Others ===
- Campos de Níjar (1954). Travels, journalism.
- Pueblo en marcha. Tierras de Manzanillo. Instantáneas de un viaje a Cuba (1962). Travels, journalism.
- Obra inglesa de Blanco White (1972). Editor.
- Coto vedado (1985). Memoir.
- En los reinos de taifa (1986). Memoir.
- Alquibla (1988). TV script for TVE.
- Estambul otomano (1989). Travels.
- Aproximaciones a Gaudí en Capadocia (1990). Travels.
- Cuaderno de Sarajevo (1993). Travels, journalism.
- Argelia en el vendaval (1994). Travels, journalism.
- Paisajes de guerra con Chechenia al fondo (1996). Travels, journalism.
- Lectura del espacio en Xemaá-El-Fná (1997). Illustrated by Hans Werner Geerdts.
- El universo imaginario (1997).
- Diálogo sobre la desmemoria, los tabúes y el olvido (2000). Conversation with Günter Grass.
- Paisajes de guerra: Sarajevo, Argelia, Palestina, Chechenia (2001).
- Pájaro que ensucia su propio nido (2001). Articles.
- Memorias (2002).
- España y sus Ejidos (2003).
- Cinema Eden: Essays from the Muslim Mediterranean (Eland, 2003) – an English-language translation of several of his essays

== Literary prizes ==
- 1985: Europalia Prize for Literature
- 1993: Nelly Sachs Prize
- 2002: Octavio Paz Prize
- 2004: Juan Rulfo Prize for Latin American and Caribbean Literature
- 2008: National Prize for Spanish Literature
- 2010: Premio Don Quijote
- 2012: Prix Formentor
- 2014: Miguel de Cervantes Prize
