= 24th Forqué Awards =

2019 ceremony for Spanish film awards

- Date: 12 January 2019
- Site: Palacio de Congresos, Zaragoza, Spain
- Hosted by: Elena S. Sánchez; Edu Soto
- Organized by: EGEDA

Highlights
- Best Picture: Champions
- Best Actor: Antonio de la Torre; The Realm
- Best Actress: Eva Llorach; Quién te cantará

Television coverage
- Network: La 1

The 24th Forqué Awards ceremony, presented by EGEDA, was held on 12 January 2019 at the Palacio de Congresos in Zaragoza. The gala was hosted by Elena S. Sánchez and Edu Soto.

== History ==
The nominations were disclosed in November 2019 at the Cine Doré. The awards had the participation of Gobierno de Aragón, Feria de Zaragoza, Palacio de Congresos de Zaragoza, with Academia del Cine Aragonés and Safecreative as collaborators.

Broadcast on La 1, the ceremony was held at the Palacio de Congresos in Zaragoza on 12 January 2019. The gala featured musical performances by Marta Sánchez, Carlos Baute, Ana Guerra and Blas Cantó. It was hosted by Elena S. Sánchez and Edu Soto.

José Frade was gifted the EGEDA Gold Medal recognizing a career in the film industry.

== Winners and nominees ==
The winners and nominees are listed as follows:

Best Fiction or Animation Film: Champions; Carmen & Lola; Entre dos aguas; The Realm	Best Documentary Film: The Silence of Others; Apuntes para una película de atracos; Camarón: Flamenco y revolución; Sad Hill Unearthed
Best Male Performance in a Film: Antonio de la Torre — The Realm; Javier Bardem — Everybody Knows; Javier Gutiérrez — Champions; José Coronado — Your Son	Best Female Performance in a Film: Eva Llorach — Quién te cantará; Alexandra Jiménez — Distances; Bárbara Lennie — Petra; Penélope Cruz — Everybody Knows
Best Short Film: Cerdita; 9 pasos; Matria	Best Latin-American Film: Roma; The Heiresses; A Twelve-Year Night; Sergio and Sergei
Cinema and Education in Values: Champions; Carmen & Lola; Sunday's Illness
