= Norbert Degoas =

Argentinian television personality

- Born: Norberto Carrodegoas; April 12, 1936; San Antonio Oeste, Argentina
- Died: September 9, 2013 (aged 77); Mar del Plata, Argentina
- Resting place: La Loma Cemetery, Mar del Plata
- Occupations: Radio announcer; television presenter; advertiser
- Years active: 1960s–2013
- Children: 2

Norberto Carrodegoas (April 12, 1936 – September 9, 2013), better known by his pseudonym Norbert Degoas, was an Argentine radio and television announcer widely regarded as a pioneer of Argentine advertising. He is best remembered for creating and starring in a series of low-budget, idiosyncratic commercials — for products such as El Cóndor, Adelgamate, and Remicoop — that became cult classics and later resurfaced as viral internet memes, earning him posthumous recognition as an early Argentine "influencer." He also hosted popular radio programs like Noche de 5 Estrellas and appeared on the ATC television show Unusual Weekly (1983), and briefly worked in the United States as weatherman on American television.

== Biography ==
Born in San Antonio Oeste, Degoas moved in the mid-1960s to Punta Alta, where he had his apex in his radio career in the 1960s and 70s. Throughout his professional life, he had a long career as a radio presenter and a long list of commercials he made, becoming popular in Argentina.

His radio career started on LU7 Radio General San Martín in Bahía Blanca, where he presented music tracks. Later he presented the iconic programs Palacio de las estrellas and El desán Showon local radio. He also presented El clan de la esquina musical on Radio Del Sur. In 1971, he took part in an 80-hour record-breaking broadcast aired on LU3 and Canal 7 Bahía Blanca with Carlos Beltrán to raise funds for Patronato de la Infancia. He moved to Mar del Plata in 1973, where he established Degoas Producciones.

His televsision career gained notoriety in the 1980s alongside Adolfo Castelo, Raúl Becerra y Nicolás Repetto among others, in the news–comedy hybrid Semanario insólito (1983), which aired on Sundays on ATC. In this program, he gained the nickname "Insólito de verdad".

The program that increased his fame was Noche de 5 Estrellas, which, sponsored by "El Condor Estrella, una luz azul en el camino", featured the phrase "Más que un programa de radio, un estado de animo". The format changed stations over the years but it became a cult program, with high audience among the youth of the time. Its opening theme was "Rataplán", whose melody was whispered by Degoas in a sensual voice over the microphone. The mental speed test was part of the interaction with the audience and the musical selection made this a unique program of its kind.

He also produced Argentina's first stripped rock radio program showcasing national and international rock music. The name was initially 1962 for the year of the appearance of British band The Beatles, but was eventually renamed Mil Novecientos Sesenta y Rock.

In 1984, he tried to have a career in the United States, and upon his first week of arrival, he was hired as an exclusive celebrity at KVEA, which became a Spanish-language television station in 1985. He started as a weatherman on the station's first newscast, becoming the first Spanish-speaking weatherman on American television. His brash and unconventional style attracted viewers to his weather reports, even among those who did not speak Spanish. While at the station, he also the high-impact advertising micro-program Club 52 that aired all day and held contests giving away one car per week. Still in California, he created Argentina Show, the first American radio program aimed at the Argentine community, in 1989, which he presented until returning to Mar del Plata in 1996.

A number of advertisements made by Degoas for the Mar del Plata market, as well as some products sold nationwide, such as Adelgamate, Aragone, El Cóndor, Rizzo Revestimientos, Spring-Up, La Paulina, Remicoop (75–1111), among others, became cult advertisements in Argentina.

From the late 2000s, his image became even more popular because the advertisements he created and starred in began to spread across the internet. One of his last works was a video for the music group Onda Vaga, for the presentation of their concert on August 20, 2013, at the Luna Park venue in Buenos Aires.

He also ventured into commercial activity in Bahía Blanca, where he ran the record store called Discomanías Toty's, at the entrance to the Galería Plaza, and which had a branch in the neighboring town of Punta Alta.

== Death ==
Around noon on September 2, 2013, Degoas left his house to make some purchases at a business located on Alem Street in the Playa Grande area. As he crossed Saavedra Street, the publicist was hit by a Chevrolet Spark, driven by Elizabeth Riadigos (wife of Julio Riadigos, owner of the Riadigos pharmacies), suffering internal trauma upon impact with the pavement. Since when the ambulance arrived he was conscious, it was thought to be a minor accident, however at the "Hospital Interzonal General de Acudos Oscar Alende" (HIGA), he had to undergo emergency surgery where he was induced into a pharmacological coma. He spent a week in intensive care, dying on September 9, at 5:30pm, due to cardiorespiratory arrest. His remains rest in the La Loma Cemetery, Mar del Plata. At the time of his death Norbert Degoas was 77 years old.

== Legacy ==
In July 2020, social media profile Historia de la Televisión Marplatense uploaded a video of the studio recording of his iconic commercial for El Condor on its Twitter profile, becoming viral in Argentina.

In 2016, directors Mariano Cohn and Gastón Duprat featured two of his commercials in the film The Distinguished Citizen.

In September 2026, British DJ Fatboy Slim included one of Degoas's jingles, that of El Cóndor, in his performance in Buenos Aires.
