= 25th Forqué Awards =

2020 Spanish film award

- Date: 11 January 2020
- Site: Palacio Municipal de Congresos, Madrid, Spain
- Hosted by: Elena S. Sánchez; Santiago Segura
- Organized by: EGEDA

Highlights
- Best Picture: The Endless Trench
- Best Actor: Antonio Banderas; Pain and Glory
- Best Actress: Marta Nieto; Mother

Television coverage
- Network: La 1 (delayed broadcasting)

The 25th Forqué Awards ceremony, presented by EGEDA, was held on 11 January 2020 at the Palacio Municipal de Congresos in Madrid. The gala was hosted by Elena S. Sánchez and Santiago Segura.

== History ==
The nominations were disclosed in November 2019. Organised by EGEDA, the awards had the participation of the Ayuntamiento de Madrid, the Community of Madrid and RTVE, and the collaboration of Ibercaja, Mercedes-Benz, ICAA, L'Oréal, AISGE, FIPCA, Alta Pavina and Cornejo.

The ceremony was hosted at the Madrid's Palacio Municipal de Congresos on 11 January 2020. The gala featured musical performances by Los Secretos, Antonio José, Ana Mena, Ángela Carrasco and Paco Arrojo. It was hosted by Elena S. Sánchez and Santiago Segura.

Gonzalo Suárez was gifted the EGEDA Gold Medal recognizing a career in the film industry whereas Pan's Labyrinth was recognised as the best Spanish film of the last 25 years over The Lucky Star, Marshland, Solas and Tesis.

== Winners and nominees ==
The winners and nominees are listed as follows:

Best Fiction or Animation Film: The Endless Trench; Pain and Glory; While at War; Fire Will Come	Best Documentary Film: Ara Malikian: Una vida entre las cuerdas; Aute Retrato; El cuadro; Historias de nuestro cine
Best Male Performance in a Film: Antonio Banderas — Pain and Glory; Antonio de la Torre — The Endless Trench; Enric Auquer — Eye for an Eye; Karra Elejalde — While at War	Best Female Performance in a Film: Marta Nieto — Mother; Belén Cuesta — The Endless Trench; Pilar Castro — Advantages of Travelling by Train; Greta Fernández — A Thief's Daughter
Best Short Film: El nadador; Maras; Suc de Síndria	Best Latin-American Film: Heroic Losers; Spider; The Chambermaid; Monos; A Translator
Cinema and Education in Values: Seventeen; Abuelos; Elisa & Marcela; Live Twice, Love Once
