= 22nd Forqué Awards =

2017 Spanish film and television awards

- Date: 14 January 2017
- Site: Teatro de la Maestranza, Seville, Spain
- Hosted by: Carlos Latre
- Organized by: EGEDA

Highlights
- Best Picture: The Fury of a Patient Man
- Best Actor: Roberto Álamo; May God Save Us
- Best Actress: Emma Suárez; Julieta

Television coverage
- Network: La 1

The 22nd Forqué Awards ceremony, presented by EGEDA, was held on 14 January 2017 at the Teatro de la Maestranza in Seville. The gala was hosted by Carlos Latre.

== History ==
The nominations were disclosed in December 2016.

Organised by EGEDA and broadcast on La 1, the ceremony was held at the Teatro de la Maestranza in Seville on 14 January 2017. It thus became the first ceremony of the Forqué Awards held outside Madrid. The gala featured musical performances by Jesse & Joy, Vanesa Martín, Diana Navarro and Arkano. It was hosted by Carlos Latre.

Antonio P. Pérez was gifted the EGEDA Gold Medal recognizing a career in the film industry.

== Winners and nominees ==
The winners and nominees are listed as follows:

Best Fiction or Animation Film: The Fury of a Patient Man; 1898, Our Last Men in the Philippines; Smoke & Mirrors; Julieta; May God Save Us; A Monster Calls	Best Documentary Film: Nacido en Siria; El Bosco. El jardín de los sueños; J: Beyond Flamenco; La historia de Jan; Miguel Picazo, un cineasta extramuros; Omega
Best Male Performance in a Film: Roberto Álamo — May God Save Us; Eduard Fernández — Smoke & Mirrors; Àlex Monner — The Next Skin; Antonio de la Torre — The Fury of a Patient Man; Oscar Martínez — The Distinguished Citizen	Best Female Performance in a Film: Emma Suárez — Julieta; Adriana Ugarte — Julieta; Anna Castillo — The Olive Tree; Bárbara Lennie — María (and Everybody Else); Carmen Machi — The Open Door; Inma Cuesta — The Bride
Best Short Film: Graffiti; Bla Bla Bla; Timecode	Best Latin-American Film: The Distinguished Citizen; Much Ado About Nothing; The Companion; Neruda; Such Is Life in the Tropics
Cinema and Education in Values: A Monster Calls; 100 Meters; The Olive Tree
