= Arambilet =

Spanish-Dominican writer

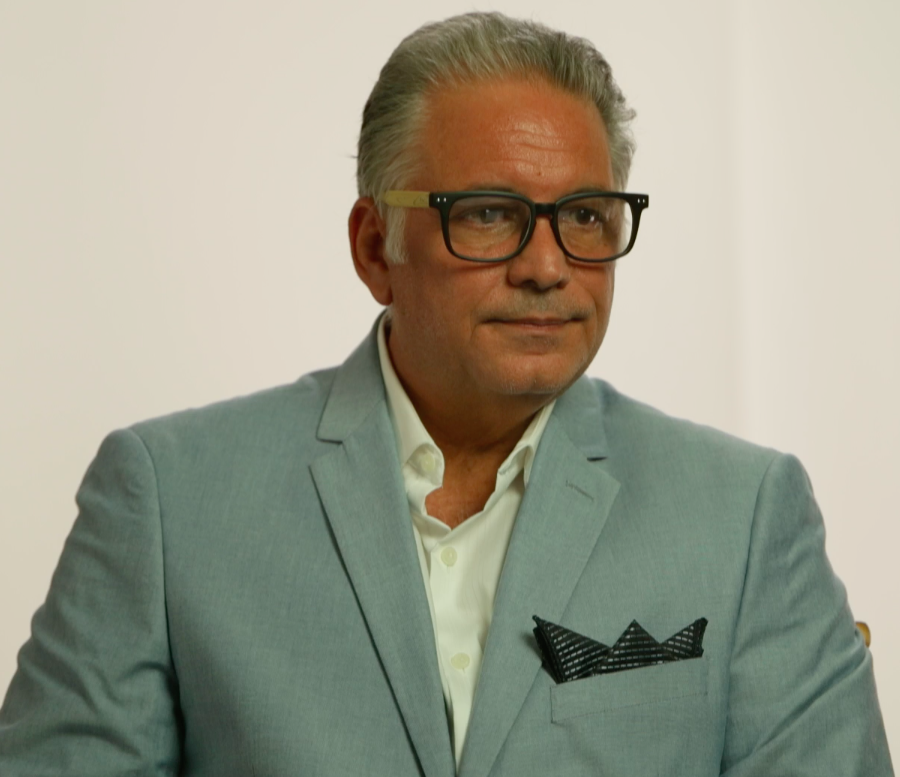
- Born: Ángel Luis Arambilet Alvarez; September 16, 1957 (age 68); Santo Domingo, Dominican Republic
- Occupations: Novelist, poet, screenwriter, painter, graphic artist, filmmaker
- Spouse: Victoria Díaz Bonnelly
- Children: 2
- Relatives: Idelisa Bonnelly (aunt-in-law)
- Awards: Dominican National Literary Awards: Short Story (1994), Novel (2005)

Ángel Luis Arambilet Álvarez (born September 16, 1957), generally known professionally as simply Arambilet, is a novelist, poet, screenwriter, painter, graphic artist and filmmaker of Spanish-Dominican descent.

== Biography ==
Arambilet was one of 34 people interviewed for The History of Computer Graphics and Digital Art Project. His work is mentioned in compArt | center of excellence digital art” (a project at the University of Bremen).

He has been awarded by the Ministry of Culture of the Dominican Republic with the National Short Story Award (The Cayenne petals, 1994) and National Novel Prize (Neguri's secret, 2006).

== Literary works ==
- Cayenne/Petals – Los pétalos de la cayena. (National Literary Prize) Dominican Republic: AH, 1993. ISBN 84-89546-02-9
- Secret Zone – Zona secreta. Santo Domingo, Dominican Republic: AH, 1994. ISBN 84-89546-00-2
- Homo sapiens. Santo Domingo, Dominican Republic: AH, 1994. ISBN 84-89546-01-0
- Quintet – Quinteto. Santo Domingo, Dominican Republic: AH, 1996. ISBN 84-89546-03-7
- Insects – Insectos. Santo Domingo, Dominican Republic: AH, 1997. ISBN 84-89546-05-3
- The Passion Book – El libro de las pasiones. Santo Domingo, Dominican Republic: AH, 2000. ISBN 99934-0-154-4
- Neguri's Secret – El secreto de Neguri. (National Literary Prize) Santo Domingo, Dominican Republic: Alfaguara Editorial Publishing House, 2005. ISBN 99934-0-154-4
- Guarocuya. Tarragona, Spain: CS, 2009. ISBN 145053192X
- Brief Stories – Historias Breves (1988–1998). Tarragona, Spain: CS, 2009. ISBN 1449527698
- The Passion Book II – El libro de las pasiones (II). Tarragona, Spain: CS, 2010. ISBN 99934-0-154-4
- Orifiel. Tarragona, Spain: CS, 2010. ISBN 1450533930
- Digital Art – Arte Digital (1949–1999). Tarragona, Spain: CS, 2011. ISBN 1463612575
- Chernobyl 25 (Essay and Poetics based on Pedro Farías Nardi photographs at Chernobyl disaster site). Tarragona, Spain: CS, 2011. ISBN 1450533930
- Consuelo (Marie Linda) (biographical novel). Santo Domingo, Dominican Republic: CS, 2017. ISBN 978-1542596541

== Screenplays and treatments ==
- The golden manatee mystery – El misterio del manatí de oro. Santo Domingo, Dominican Republic: 2006. Safe Creative: 1010117549995
- Guarocuya. Santo Domingo, Dominican Republic: 2006. Safe Creative: 0907174135227
- The distant counterweight of the stars – El lejano contrapeso de los astros. Santo Domingo, Dominican Republic: 2007. Safe Creative: 010117550021
- Amín Abel. Santo Domingo, Dominican Republic: 2014. ONDA 4597-10, Safe Creative:1402040027099
- 1916. Santo Domingo, Dominican Republic: 2014. Safe Creative: 1403130354040
- Nico Mota's Accordion – El acordeón de Ñico Mota. Santo Domingo, Dominican Republic: 2014. Safe Creative: 1402040027037
- Fons (La Chepa). Santo Domingo, Dominican Republic: 2014. Safe Creative: 1402040027020
- Two ways – Doble Sentido. Santo Domingo, Dominican Republic: 2014. ONDA: 4903-11
- Código Paz. Santo Domingo, Dominican Republic: 2014. ONDA: ND
- The loanshark – El prestamista. Santo Domingo, Dominican Republic: 2014. ONDA: ND
- Bachata gringa. Santo Domingo, Dominican Republic: 2015. Safe Creative: 1509295258879
- DOC-108. Santo Domingo, Dominican Republic: 2015. ONDA: 6469-12
- The thousand year legacy. Santo Domingo, Dominican Republic: 2015. Treatment for Lantica Pictures.
- Rulin. Santo Domingo, Dominican Republic: 2017. Safe Creative: 1711064751850
- Consuelo (Marie Linda). Santo Domingo, Dominican Republic: 2014. ONDA: 11694-20

== Art exhibitions ==
- Arambilet: Ten years and five series (1989–1999). Casa Guayasamín, Santo Domingo, Dominican Republic:1999.
- XIX ELJ Visual Arts Biennial. Centro León, Bienal Eduardo León Jimenes, Santiago, Dominican Republic: 2002.
- Homo sapiens: Characters to hang. Galería DPI, Santo Domingo, Dominican Republic: 2002.
- XXII National Visual Arts Biennial. Museo de Arte Moderno, Santo Domingo, Dominican Republic: 2003.
- XX ELJ Visual Arts Biennial. Centro León, Bienal Eduardo León Jimenes, Santiago, Dominican Republic: 2004.
- Colective, Palacio Consistorial. Santo Domingo, Dominican Republic: 2004.
- XXIII National Visual Arts Biennial. Museo de Arte Moderno, Santo Domingo, Santo Domingo, Dominican Republic: 2005.
- Colective itinerant: Artes/Miniaturas en portada. Viota Gallery, San Juan, Puerto Rico: 2006.
- XXI ELJ Visual Arts Biennial. Centro León, Bienal Eduardo León Jimenes, Santiago, Dominican Republic: 2006.
- Colective: Saatchi Online. Saatchi Gallery, London, UK: 2009.
- Colective DART-09: XIII Conferencia Internacional sobre Visualización de la Información IV09. 2D Exhibiting artist with "Dots on the i's"; Universidad Pompeu Fabra, Barcelona, Spain: 2009.
- Colective CGIV09: VI International Computerized Graphics, images and visualization Conference Tianjin, China: 2009.
- Ebre Terra de Vent Colective. Palau Oliver de Boteller, Tortosa, Spain: 2010.
- Colectiva fotográfica, Leica Oskar Barnack Award. Between real and surreal: The abstraction. Wetzlar, Germany: 2011.
- Colectiva Fotográfica, Brangulí was here: How about you? – Centre de Cultura Contemporánea de Barcelona (CCCB), Spain: 2011.
- XXVI National Visual Arts Biennial. Museo de Arte Moderno, Santo Domingo, Dominican Republic: 2011.

== Filmography ==
Year	Títle	Role	Notes
2002	Miriam Calzada: Montecristi	Director, producer, screenwriter	Documentary I from series: "Art and artists"
2003	Marcos Lora Read: Kid Kapicua	Director, producer, screenwriter	Documentary II from series: "Art and artists"
2005	Neguri's Secret – El secreto de Neguri	Director, producer, editor, screenwriter	Documentary with the insertion of two Short Films by Pedro Guzmán and Esteban Martin.
2006	Waltz – Vals	Director, producer, screenwriter	Official selection Rainier International Film Festival (RIFF) 2007
2006	Sepiablue – Sepiazul	Director, producer, editor	Premiered at XVI Spanish and Latin American International Film Festival. Cervantes Institute of Manchester & Leeds, Cornerhouse, Manchester, UK.
2006	Luck – La suerte	Director, producer, editor, screenwriter	Official Selection and nominated as Best Foreign Film at the San Fernando Valley International Film Festival (VIFFI) 2007.
2007	A imagen y semejanza	Director, producer, editor, screenwriter	Selección Oficial XXII Bienal de Artes Visuales ELJ; Santiago, R.D. Honorable Mention of the Jury.
2007	Efecto Kuleshov Caribe	Director, producer, editor, screenwriter	Official Selection at the XXIIELJ Visual Arts Biennial; Santiago, Dominican Republic. Honorable Mention of the Jury.
2010	Spécimen 1111	Director, producer, editor, screenwriter	Premiered at XVI Spanish and Latin American International Film Festival. Cervantes Institute of Manchester & Leeds, Cornerhouse, Manchester, UK.; Online Digital Gallery D-ART 2011 for the International Conference Information Visualization iV 2011 (London), and the International Conference “Computer Graphics, Imaging and Visualization” CGIV 2011 (Singapur).
2011	Diáspora Caleidoscópica	Director, producer, editor, screenwriter	Official Selection XVI National Visual Arts Biennial, Museo de Arte Moderno, Santo Domingo, Dominican Republic
2011	Sureya: Mother of everyone	Director, editor	Documentary on the life and works of a Dominican social activist in Catalunya, Spain
2013	The aragone's Memoirs – Memorias de un aragonés	Director, producer, editor	Official Selection Premios Platino del Cine Iberoamericano. Nominated as best documentary for Dominican Republic / Spain.
2013	Culture Shock: It’s a rocking new life	Content Producer	Reality Show for TV: Pilot.
2013	Shadows – Sombras	Director, producer, screenwriter, editor	Official Selection: Llatinoamerica ProjecCat, Barcelona, Spain
2014	Código Paz	Screenwriter, Post-Production Supervisor	Official Selection: Prize ADOCINE "La Silla", Best Screenplay Award Winner. Official Selection and nominated as Best Latinamerican Film at Premio Cinematográfico José María Forqué Premio Cinematográfico José María Forqué, Madrid, Spain. Dominican REpublic's Official Selection to Premios Goya, Madrid, Spain. Official Selection as Best PIcture and Best Screenplay to the II Platinum Awards for the Iberoamerican Cinema/II Premios Platino al cine Iberoamericano Premios Platino.
2016	Dr. Nasha	Director, producer, screenwriter, editor	Documentary about a talented Catalan artist with Crohn's Disease, that dissects society through the eyes of his Comic Book character, Dr. Nasha.
