= 21st Forqué Awards =

2016 Spanish film and television awards

- Date: 11 January 2016
- Site: Palacio Municipal de Congresos, Madrid, Spain
- Hosted by: Macarena Gómez; José Corbacho
- Organized by: EGEDA

Highlights
- Best Picture: Truman
- Best Actor: Ricardo Darín; Truman
- Best Actress: Natalia de Molina; Food and Shelter

Television coverage
- Network: La 1

The 21st Forqué Awards ceremony, presented by EGEDA, was held on 11 January 2016 at the Palacio Municipal de Congresos in Madrid. The gala, aired on La 1, was hosted by Macarena Gómez and José Corbacho.

== History ==
The nominations were disclosed in December 2015. Truman and The Clan (running both in the Best Film and the Best Latin-American film categories) gathered the most nominations.

Organised by EGEDA, the award ceremony was held at the Palacio Municipal de Congresos in Madrid on 11 January 2016. The gala got off to a late start because the regional president Cristina Cifuentes did not arrive in time. It featured musical performances by Antonio Orozco, Edurne, Manuel Carrasco, Pablo López and Soraya. Edu Soto and Tricicle provided comic relief. It was hosted by José Corbacho and Macarena Gómez.

Santiago Segura was gifted the EGEDA Gold Medal recognizing a career in the film industry.

== Winners and nominees ==
The winners and nominees are listed as follows:

Best Film: Truman; Nothing in Return; The Clan; Endless Night	Best Documentary Film: Nacido en Gaza; 13. Miguel Poveda; Basilio Martín Patino. La décima carta; Ciutat Morta; I Am Your Father
Best Male Performance in a Film: Ricardo Darín — Truman; Guillermo Francella — The Clan; Javier Cámara — Truman; Luis Tosar — Retribution; Pedro Casablanc — B, la película	Best Female Performance in a Film: Natalia de Molina — Food and Shelter; Irene Escolar — An Autumn Without Berlin; Juliette Binoche — Endless Night; Nora Navas — La adopción; Penélope Cruz — Ma Ma
Best Short Film: El Corredor; Bikini; Inside the box; Os meninos do Rio; Óscar desafinado	Best Latin-American Film: The Club; Embrace of the Serpent; The Clan; The Memory of Water; Magallanes
