= Villa Alsina =

- Town
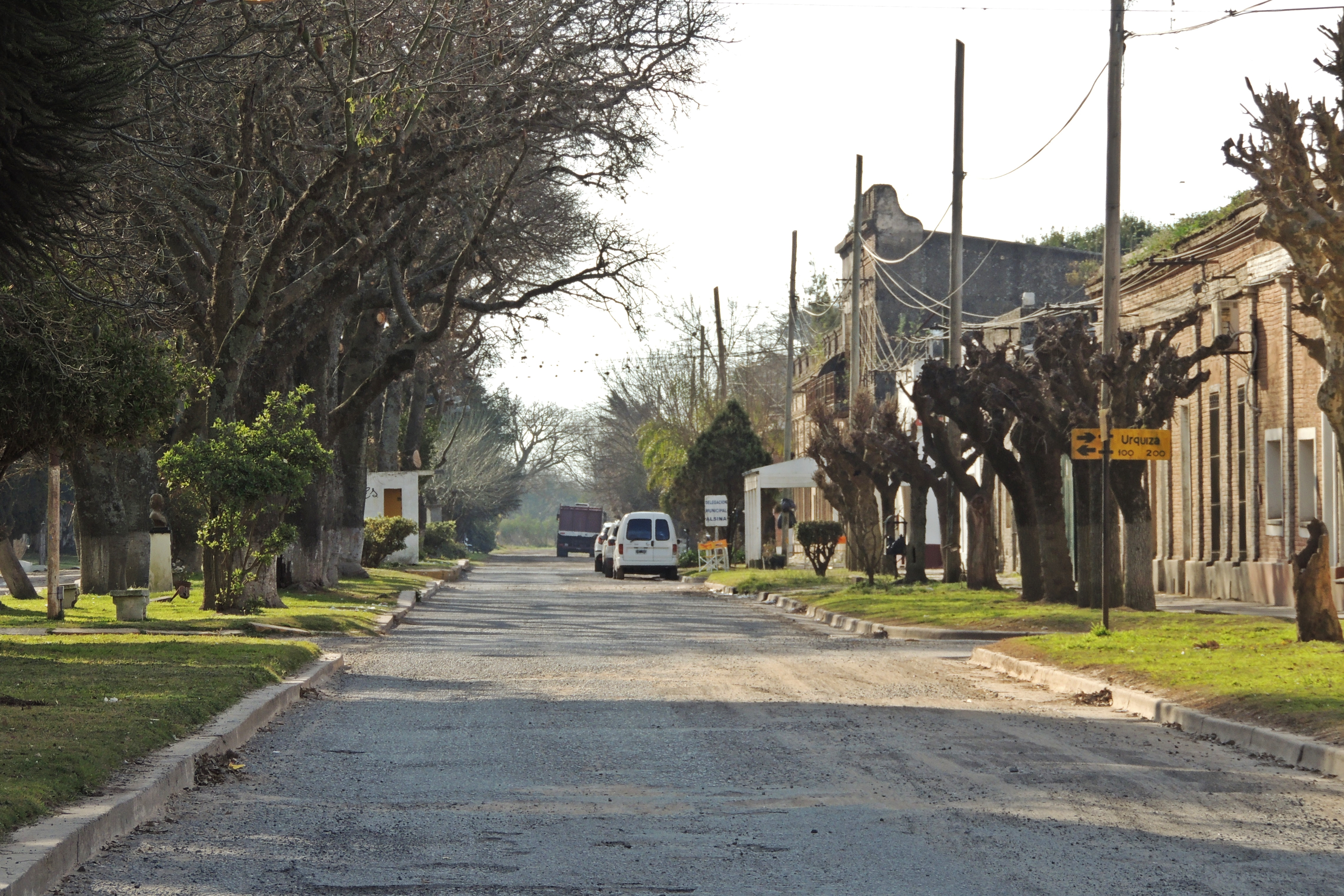

- Location within Buenos Aires Province
- Coordinates: 33°54′S 59°23′W
- Country: Argentina
- Province: Buenos Aires
- Partidos: Baradero
- Established: November 10, 1886
- Elevation: 32 m (105 ft)

Population (2001 Census)
  - Total: 1,184
- Time zone: UTC−3 (ART)
- CPA Base: B 2938
- Climate: Dfc

Villa Alsina, sometimes shortened to Alsina, is a town located in the Baradero Partido in the province of Buenos Aires, Argentina.

== Geography ==
Alsina is located 27 km (17 mi) from the town of Baradero, and 129 km (80 mi) from the city of Buenos Aires.

== History ==
A railroad, the first in the partido, was constructed through the town in 1885. Alsina would be founded a year later through donations from several landowners on November 10, 1886. A school was built in the town in 1889. Like many towns in Argentina, passenger rail service no longer serves Alsina.

== Economy ==
A chemical factory is located in the town. In recent years, the town has also seen a surge in tourism contributing to the local economy.

== Population ==
According to INDEC, which collects population data for the country, the town had a population of 1,184 people as of the 2001 census.

== In popular culture ==
The 2019 film Heroic Losers was filmed in and took place in Alsina.
