= Pain and Glory =

2019 film directed by Pedro Almodóvar

- Theatrical release poster
- Spanish: Dolor y gloria
- Directed by: Pedro Almodóvar
- Written by: Pedro Almodóvar
- Produced by: Agustín Almodóvar; Esther García; Ricardo Marco Budé; Ignacio Salazar-Simpson
- Starring: Antonio Banderas; Asier Etxeandia; Leonardo Sbaraglia; Nora Navas; Julieta Serrano; Penélope Cruz
- Cinematography: José Luis Alcaine
- Edited by: Teresa Font
- Music by: Alberto Iglesias
- Production company: El Deseo
- Distributed by: Sony Pictures Releasing International
- Release dates: 13 March 2019 (Cine Capitol); 22 March 2019 (Spain)
- Running time: 114 minutes
- Country: Spain
- Language: Spanish
- Budget: €9.6 million
- Box office: $37.4 million

Pain and Glory (Spanish: Dolor y gloria) is a 2019 Spanish drama film, written and directed by Pedro Almodóvar. It stars Antonio Banderas as an aging and ailing film director who reflects on his life. The supporting cast features Asier Etxeandia, Leonardo Sbaraglia, Nora Navas, Julieta Serrano, and Penélope Cruz.

Pain and Glory was released in Spain on 22 March 2019 to positive reviews. It made its international debut at the 2019 Cannes Film Festival, where it competed for the Palme d'Or and won two awards: Banderas for Best Actor and Alberto Iglesias for Best Soundtrack. At the 92nd Academy Awards, Pain and Glory was nominated for Best International Feature Film, and Banderas was nominated for Best Actor.

== Plot ==
Madrid-based filmmaker Salvador Mallo's health is in decline, which has made him depressed and reflective. His back pain and headaches have kept him from considering a new project for several years, and recently he has experienced persistent dysphagia. Flavor, one of Salvador's old films, has just been restored, and he is asked to appear at a screening. He has not seen the film's lead Alberto in decades, having fallen out over Alberto's heroin use during filming. Still, he reaches out to Alberto and asks him to present Flavor with him. When Alberto prepares to smoke heroin, he is surprised Salvador wants to join. Under the influence, Salvador remembers moving with his impoverished parents into a cave-house in Paterna as a child.

When Alberto arrives to take Salvador to the screening, Salvador decides not to go, but the moderator poses audience questions to him over the phone. When asked about their old argument, Salvador repeats his old criticisms and blurts out that Alberto took heroin during filming. Although he says he now approves of Alberto's performance, Alberto is enraged and leaves. Salvador starts to regularly take heroin to manage his pain. He remembers when, as a boy, his mother arranged for him to teach a young man named Eduardo how to read, in exchange for work on the cave. She then used this as evidence of his intelligence to gain him admittance to a seminary. Although he did not want to leave home or become a priest, his mother saw it as the only way they could afford to get him an education.

To make amends, Salvador agrees to let Alberto stage a story he wrote about a relationship he had in the 1980s that fell apart due to his partner Federico's heroin use. Coincidentally, Federico attends the show and obtains Salvador's contact information from Alberto. When the former lovers meet, Federico says he has been living in Argentina and that this is his first time in Madrid in decades. He reveals he has a wife, from whom he is separated, and two sons, and that he has not dated a man since he broke up with Salvador. On his way out the door, Federico offers to stay the night, but Salvador says they should leave their relationship in the past. Salvador then discards his heroin.

Accompanied by his assistant, Mercedes, he sees doctors about his pain and dysphagia, and admits to his heroin use. He reveals that he has not recovered either from his mother's death or his back surgery from years earlier. Salvador reminisces with Mercedes about his mother's last days, spent with him in Madrid, when she revealed she did not want him to write stories about her and thought he resented her for sending him to the seminary. Although Salvador was able to apologise for not being the son she wanted, he feels guilty he was not able to take her to her village to die, like he had promised.

Mercedes shows Salvador an invitation card to an art gallery and he recognises the painting of a boy on it. He remembers when Eduardo began sketching him after working at the Mallos' cave-house. Eduardo then bathed himself, and young Salvador fainted upon seeing him naked, marking his sexual awakening. Salvador goes to the gallery and learns that the owner had found Eduardo's artwork at a flea market. Salvador buys the painting and discovers a letter written on the back in which Eduardo thanks him for his help tutoring him. Meanwhile, a CT scan reveals the cause of his dysphagia as an easily operable calcified growth in his neck, and not a tumour as feared.

On the way to his surgery, Salvador muses to Mercedes that his mother must have received the portrait but never mentioned it to him. Mercedes asks if he will try to find Eduardo, but Salvador says too much time has passed and what matters is that the painting finally made its way to him. As Salvador slips into unconsciousness on the operating table, he mentions to his doctor that he has started writing again. He is then seen on a film set directing a scene from his childhood, in a meta-like ending with Penelope Cruz and Asier Flores.

== Cast ==
- Antonio Banderas as Salvador Mallo
  - Asier Flores as Salvador Mallo as a child*
- Asier Etxeandia as Alberto Crespo
- Leonardo Sbaraglia as Federico Delgado
- Nora Navas as Mercedes, Salvador's assistant
- Penélope Cruz as Jacinta, Salvador's mother*
  - Julieta Serrano as elderly Jacinta
- César Vicente as Eduardo, the painter and carpenter*
- Cecilia Roth as Zulema, an actress
- Susi Sánchez as Beata, the lay sister*
- Raúl Arévalo as Venancio Mallo, Salvador's father*
- Pedro Casablanc as Doctor Galindo
- Julián López as Presenter (at the film screening)
- Sara Sierra as Conchita, Salvador's housekeeper
- Rosalía as Rosita, a laundress*
- Marisol Muriel as Mari, a laundress*
- Paqui Horcajo as Mercedes, a laundress*
- Agustín Almodóvar as Priest*

== Production ==
El Deseo announced plans for the new film in April 2018, confirming Antonio Banderas and Asier Etxeandia as leads with Penélope Cruz and Julieta Serrano in supporting roles. Rosalía's appearance in the film was revealed by her presence in the trailer, which premiered on 31 January 2019.

In May 2018, Almodóvar was pictured researching locations in the Province of Valencia with cinematographer José Luis Alcaine. The following June, Fotogramas reported that a large part of the filming would take place in Valencia, particularly in the municipality of Paterna. The same month, Agustín Almodóvar, the producer of the film, posted a photo on Twitter of his brother, Pedro, on set, which was later followed by photos of Banderas, Sbaraglia, and Cruz together in screen tests for the film.

Agustín Almodóvar announced via Twitter that filming began on 16 July 2018. The 44-day shoot concluded on 15 September.

== Release ==
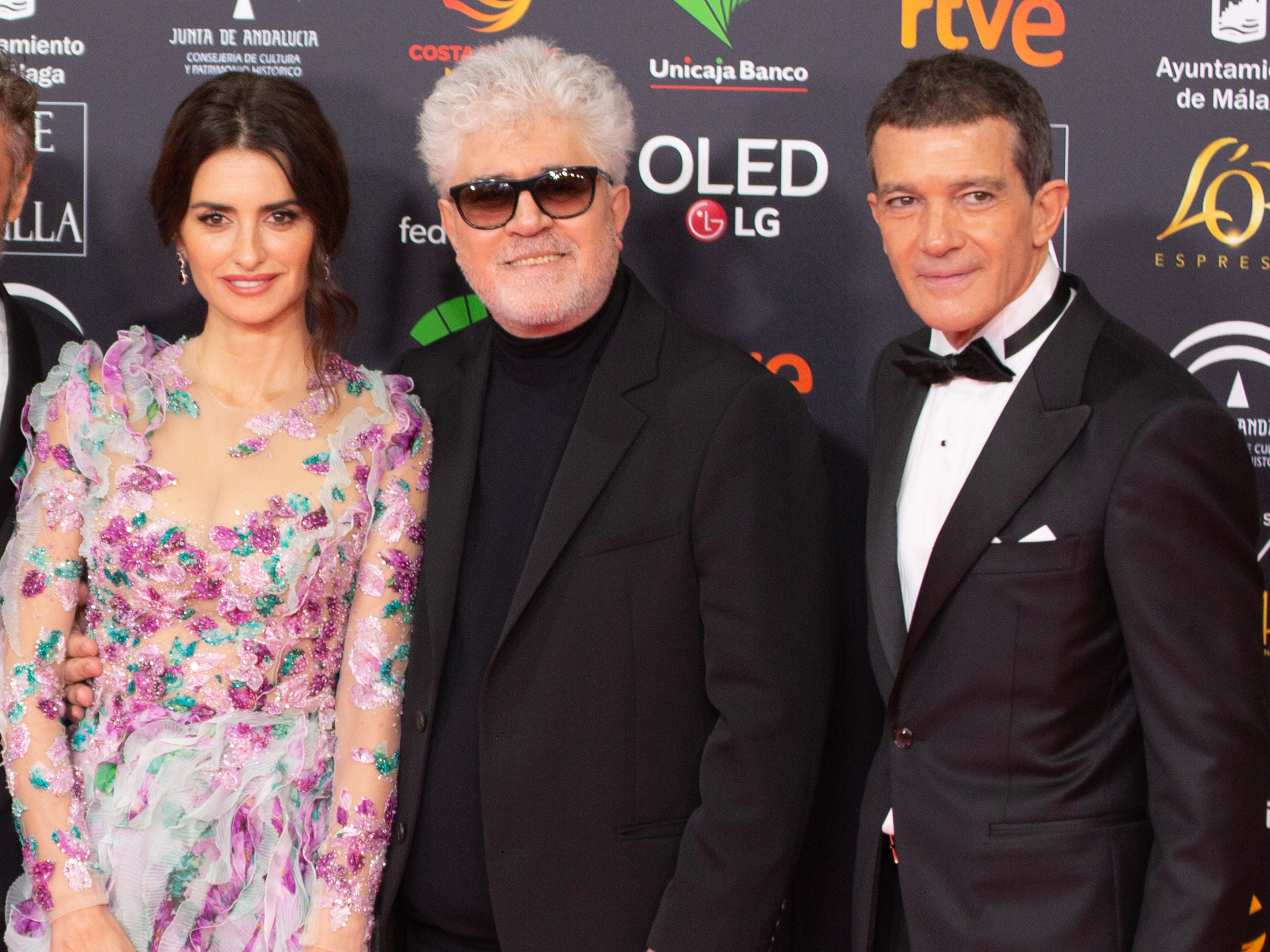
Cruz, Almodóvar and Banderas at the 34th Goya Awards on 25 January 2020

Pain and Glory premiered at the Cine Capitol in Madrid on 13 March 2019. That May, it made its international debut at the Cannes Film Festival, where it competed for the Palme d'Or and won two awards: Banderas for Best Actor and Alberto Iglesias for Best Soundtrack. It was released in Spanish theatres nine days later. It was released in the United Kingdom by Pathé and 20th Century Fox on 23 August, and received a limited release in the United States from Sony Pictures Classics starting on 4 October.

== Reception ==
=== Box office ===
The film drew more than 45,000 moviegoers in Spain on the Friday of its release, making it the most-viewed film in the country on that day. It was estimated the film earned €300,000 in its first day and €1.2 million in its debut weekend. By September the film had grossed €6.5 million in Spain, making it the highest-grossing Spanish film of 2019. Worldwide, Pain and Glory has earned $36.6 million.

=== Critical response ===
On review aggregator website Rotten Tomatoes, the film holds an approval rating of 96% based on 306 reviews, with an average rating of 8.3/10; the website's critics consensus reads: "Pain and Glory finds writer-director Pedro Almodóvar drawing on his own life to rewarding effect -- and honoring his craft as only a master filmmaker can." On Metacritic, the film has a weighted average score of 88 out of 100, based on 42 critics, indicating "universal acclaim".

Initial Spanish critical reception of the film was generally positive. Pain and Glory received an average score of 7.7/10 from 1,448 reviews on FilmAffinity, and an average critical rating of 4.3/5 from 14 critical reviews on Sensacine. In Fotogramas, Beatriz Martínez gave the film a 5-star review that complimented the director's artistry. Quim Casas of El Periódico de Catalunya also gave the film five stars, while Oti Rodríguez Marchante of ABC gave the film 4 out of 5 stars, and Marta Medina of El Confidencial gave the film 3 out of 5 stars. In the Catalan daily newspaper Ara, Manu Yáñez compared the film's twilight serenity and checked emotion to that of the masterpiece last films made by John Huston (The Dead) and Carl Theodor Dreyer (Gertrud).

Manohla Dargis of The New York Times gave the film a rave review and chose it as her Critic's pick of the week writing: "A great deal happens in Pain and Glory, just not ritualistically and not at top volume. Its agonies are tempered, its regrets hushed, its restraint powerful." She also named it "The Best Movie of 2019".

Carlos Boyero of El País declared himself unable to "feel moved in the slightest, or even a little, or at all, by the torment, the profound reunions and the need for healing" of the director.

TIME magazine named Pain and Glory as the best film of 2019. The Guardian ranked the film at No. 10 on its list of the "50 best films of 2019". Sight & Sound magazine named it the 6th-best film of the year.

In July 2025, it ranked number 37 on Rolling Stone's list of "The 100 Best Movies of the 21st Century."

=== Accolades ===
List of awards and nominations
Year	Award	Category	Recipients	Result	Ref.
2019	Cannes Film Festival	Palme d'Or	Pedro Almodóvar	Nominated	
2019	Cannes Film Festival	Best Actor	Antonio Banderas	Won	
2019	Cannes Film Festival	Cannes Soundtrack Award	Alberto Iglesias	Won	
2019	Cannes Film Festival	Queer Palm	Pedro Almodóvar	Nominated	
2019	Imagen Awards	Best Feature Film	Pedro Almodóvar	Nominated	
2019	International Cinephile Society Awards	Prix du Jury	Pedro Almodóvar	Won	
2019	International Cinephile Society Awards	Best Actor	Antonio Banderas	Won	
2019	23rd Hollywood Film Awards	Best Actor	Antonio Banderas	Won	
2019	84th New York Film Critics Circle Awards	Best Actor	Antonio Banderas	Won	
2019	45th Los Angeles Film Critics Association Awards	Best Foreign Language Film	Pain and Glory	Won	
2019	45th Los Angeles Film Critics Association Awards	Best Actor	Antonio Banderas	Won	
2019	54th National Society of Film Critics Awards	Best Actor	Antonio Banderas	Won	
2019	32nd European Film Awards	Best European Film	Pain and Glory	Nominated	
2019	32nd European Film Awards	EFA Lux Award	Pain and Glory	Nominated	
2019	32nd European Film Awards	Best Director	Pedro Almodóvar	Nominated	
2019	32nd European Film Awards	Best Actor	Antonio Banderas	Won	
2019	32nd European Film Awards	Best Screenwriter	Pedro Almodóvar	Nominated	
2019	32nd European Film Awards	Best Production Designer	Antxon Gómez	Won	
2019	Huading Awards	Best Global Motion Picture	Pain and Glory	Nominated	
2019	Huading Awards	Best Global Director for a Motion Picture	Pedro Almodóvar	Nominated	
2019	Huading Awards	Best Global Actor in a Motion Picture	Antonio Banderas	Nominated	
2019	Huading Awards	Best Global Supporting Actor in a Motion Picture	Asier Etxeandia	Nominated	
2019	Huading Awards	Best Global Supporting Actress in a Motion Picture	Julieta Serrano	Won	
2019	Huading Awards	Best Global Writing for a Motion Picture	Pedro Almodóvar	Nominated	
2020	9th AACTA International Awards	Best International Actor	Antonio Banderas	Nominated	
2020	77th Golden Globe Awards	Best Foreign Language Film	Pain and Glory	Nominated	
2020	77th Golden Globe Awards	Best Actor - Motion Picture Drama	Antonio Banderas	Nominated	
2020	25th Forqué Awards	Best Film		Nominated	
2020	25th Forqué Awards	Best Actor	Antonio Banderas	Won	
2020	25th Critics' Choice Awards	Best Foreign Language Film	Pain and Glory	Nominated	
2020	25th Critics' Choice Awards	Best Actor	Antonio Banderas	Nominated	
2020	7th Feroz Awards	Best Drama Film	Pain and Glory	Won	
2020	7th Feroz Awards	Best Director	Pedro Almodóvar	Won	
2020	7th Feroz Awards	Best Screenplay	Pedro Almodóvar	Won	
2020	7th Feroz Awards	Best Main Actor in a Film	Antonio Banderas	Won	
2020	7th Feroz Awards	Best Supporting Actor in a Film	Asier Etxeandia	Nominated	
2020	7th Feroz Awards	Best Supporting Actor in a Film	Leonardo Sbaraglia	Nominated	
2020	7th Feroz Awards	Best Supporting Actress in a Film	Julieta Serrano	Won	
2020	7th Feroz Awards	Best Supporting Actress in a Film	Penélope Cruz	Nominated	
2020	7th Feroz Awards	Best Original Soundtrack	Alberto Iglesias	Won	
2020	7th Feroz Awards	Best Trailer	Jorge Luengo	Nominated	
2020	75th CEC Medals	Best Film	Pain and Glory	Won	
2020	75th CEC Medals	Best Director	Pedro Almodóvar	Won	
2020	75th CEC Medals	Best Actor	Antonio Banderas	Won	
2020	75th CEC Medals	Best Supporting Actor	Asier Etxeandia	Nominated	
2020	75th CEC Medals	Best Supporting Actress	Julieta Serrano	Nominated	
2020	75th CEC Medals	Best Supporting Actress	Penélope Cruz	Nominated	
2020	75th CEC Medals	Best Original Screenplay	Pedro Almodóvar	Won	
2020	75th CEC Medals	Best Cinematography	José Luis Alcaine	Nominated	
2020	75th CEC Medals	Best Editing	Teresa Font	Nominated	
2020	75th CEC Medals	Best Original Score	Alberto Iglesias	Won	
2020	34th Goya Awards	Best Film	Pain and Glory	Won	
2020	34th Goya Awards	Best Director	Pedro Almodóvar	Won	
2020	34th Goya Awards	Best Actor	Antonio Banderas	Won	
2020	34th Goya Awards	Best Actress	Penélope Cruz	Nominated	
2020	34th Goya Awards	Best Supporting Actor	Asier Etxeandia	Nominated	
2020	34th Goya Awards	Best Supporting Actor	Leonardo Sbaraglia	Nominated	
2020	34th Goya Awards	Best Supporting Actress	Julieta Serrano	Won	
2020	34th Goya Awards	Best Original Screenplay	Pedro Almodóvar	Won	
2020	34th Goya Awards	Best Cinematography	José Luis Alcaine	Nominated	
2020	34th Goya Awards	Best Editing	Teresa Font	Won	
2020	34th Goya Awards	Best Art Direction	Antxon Gómez	Nominated	
2020	34th Goya Awards	Best Production Supervision	Toni Novella	Nominated	
2020	34th Goya Awards	Best Sound	Sergio Bürmann, Pelayo Gutiérrez and Marc Orts	Nominated	
2020	34th Goya Awards	Best Costume Design	Paola Torres	Nominated	
2020	34th Goya Awards	Best Makeup and Hairstyles	Ana Lozano, Sergio Pérez Berbel and Montse Ribé	Nominated	
2020	34th Goya Awards	Best Original Score	Alberto Iglesias	Won	
2020	73rd British Academy Film Awards	Best Film Not in the English Language	Pedro Almodóvar and Agustín Almodóvar	Nominated	
2020	92nd Academy Awards	Best Actor	Antonio Banderas	Nominated	
2020	92nd Academy Awards	Best International Feature Film	Spain	Nominated	
2020	22nd Polish Film Awards	Best European Film	Pain and Glory	Nominated	
2020	29th Actors and Actresses Union Awards	Best Film Actor in a Leading Role	Antonio Banderas	Nominated	
2020	29th Actors and Actresses Union Awards	Best Film Actress in a Leading Role	Penélope Cruz	Nominated	
2020	29th Actors and Actresses Union Awards	Best Film Actor in a Secondary Role	Asier Etxeandia	Won	
2020	29th Actors and Actresses Union Awards	Best Film Actor in a Minor Role	Leonardo Sbaraglia	Won	
2020	29th Actors and Actresses Union Awards	Best Film Actress in a Minor Role	Julieta Serrano	Won	
2020	29th Actors and Actresses Union Awards	Best Film Actress in a Minor Role	Susi Sánchez	Nominated	
2020	29th Actors and Actresses Union Awards	Best New Actor	César Vicente	Nominated	
2020	7th Platino Awards	Best Ibero-American Film	Pain and Glory	Won	
2020	7th Platino Awards	Best Director	Pedro Almodóvar	Won	
2020	7th Platino Awards	Best Screenplay	Pedro Almodóvar	Won	
2020	7th Platino Awards	Best Actor	Antonio Banderas	Won	
2020	7th Platino Awards	Best Original Score	Alberto Iglesias	Won	
2020	7th Platino Awards	Best Film Editing	Teresa Font	Won	
2020	7th Platino Awards	Best Sound	Sergio Bürmann, Pelayo Gutiérrez, Marc Orts	Nominated	
2020	14th Gopo Awards	Best European Film	Pain and Glory	Won	
2020	31st GLAAD Media Awards	Outstanding Film – Limited Release	Pain and Glory	Nominated	
2020	62nd Ariel Awards	Best Ibero-American Film	Pain and Glory	Won	

== See also ==
- List of Spanish films of 2019
- List of submissions to the 92nd Academy Awards for Best International Feature Film
- List of Spanish submissions for the Academy Award for Best International Feature Film
