= Heroic Losers =

2019 film

- Theatrical release poster
- Spanish: La odisea de los giles
- Directed by: Sebastián Borensztein
- Written by: Sebastián Borensztein; Eduardo Sacheri
- Based on: La noche de la Usina by Eduardo Sacheri
- Produced by: Hugo Sigman; Ricardo Darín; Matías Mosteirin; Chino Darín; Federico Posternak; Leticia Cristi; Fernando Bovaira; Simón de Santiago
- Starring: Ricardo Darín; Luis Brandoni; Chino Darín; Verónica Llinás; Daniel Aráoz; Carlos Belloso; Marco Caponi; Rita Cortese; Andrés Parra
- Cinematography: Rodrigo Pulpeiro
- Edited by: Alejandro Carrillo Penovi
- Music by: Federico Jusid
- Production companies: Kramer & Sigman Films; Kenya Films; MOD Producciones
- Distributed by: Warner Bros. Pictures
- Release date: 15 August 2019 (Argentina)
- Running time: 116 minutes
- Countries: Argentina; Spain
- Language: Spanish
- Box office: $7.365 million

Heroic Losers (Spanish: La odisea de los giles) is a 2019 heist comedy-drama film co-written and directed by Sebastián Borensztein, based on the novel La noche de la Usina (The Night of the Heroic Losers) by Eduardo Sacheri, who also co-wrote the screenplay. It features an ensemble cast including Ricardo Darín, Luis Brandoni, Chino Darín, Verónica Llinás, Daniel Aráoz, Carlos Belloso, Marco Caponi, Rita Cortese, and Andrés Parra.

Heroic Losers was released in Argentina on 15 August 2019, and held its international premiere as part of the Special Presentations section at the Toronto International Film Festival. The film received praise for its performances, and critics compared it to How to Steal a Million (1966) and Ocean's Eleven (2001). It was selected as the Argentine entry for the Best International Feature Film at the 92nd Academy Awards, but it was not nominated.

== Plot ==
In August 2001, in the small town of Villa Alsina, Fermín Perlassi, his wife Lidia and his friend Antonio Fontana come up with a plan to reopen an agricultural cooperative which went bankrupt years ago. They learn the minimal investment to cover the initial costs reaches 300,000 dollars and bring the idea to the town's residents: mechanic Rolo Belaúnde, self-employed fix-it brothers Gómez, unemployed riparian Medina, and Carmen Lorgio, the town's shipping company's owner, who all agree and chip in. They manage to reach 158,653 dollars, which Fermín deposits in the bank vault in Villagrán.

A few days later, Alvarado, the bank manager, summons Fermín to the bank and manipulates him into depositing the money in his own account. Fermín complies and travels back to Alsina, but the financial crisis reaches its peak the next day as the President decides to freeze every U.S. dollar-denominated account in Argentina. Upon learning that Alvarado knew about the incoming government measures — and personally approved a loan request by Fortunato Manzi, a lawyer who converted the credit to U.S. dollars and withdrew all deposited dollar bills from the bank — Fermín and Lidia travel to Villagrán to confront Alvarado, to no avail; on the way back, their car is run off the road by a truck, killing Lidia and severely injuring Fermín.

One year later, Manzi hires a construction worker to dig a 9m² hole in the middle of a nearby rural area. Convinced that it serves as burial vault to store the dollars, Balaúnde, Fontana, Fermín, his son Rodrigo, Fontana, Medina, the Gómez brothers, Carmen and her son, Hernán, reunite and decide to crack the vault and retrieve their "stolen" money. Manzi, however, has installed an impenetrable alarm device around the vault. After rewatching a scene from How to Steal a Million, Fermín comes up with the idea to set off the alarm multiple times. This will force Manzi to disconnect its battery, which coupled with a power supply cut, would allow the crew to enter the vault. Meanwhile, Rodrigo poses as a gardener assigned to work at Manzi's office lawn to keep track of him.

Fermín and Fontana track the power cables and succeed in installing a junction box, repeatedly cutting and restoring the area's power supply and causing the alarm to set off multiple times a day. Manzi eventually disconnects the battery. His secretary Florencia, however, realizes Rodrigo is not a gardener, which prompts him to confess their plans to her. Trusting she will not tell Manzi about it as Florencia's father was also scammed by Manzi, Rodrigo convinces the group to carry on with the plan.

That night, the crew splits into two groups: Belaúnde and Medina are tasked with destroying the power generator that supplies the area while Fermín, Rodrigo and Hernán will break into the safe when the lights go off. By accident, Medina creates an explosion that destroys all generators, causing a massive blackout. Manzi, who is at a party that is also affected by the power outage, suspects something is wrong and heads to the vault. Meanwhile, Fermín and the others break into the vault and proceed to retrieve the money. Manzi arrives soon after, but his car gets stuck in a mud barricade set by Fontana. The crew flees with the money as Manzi curses and threatens them from a distance. Later, they separate the money in two cars: one driven by Rodrigo and the other by Hernán, and return to Alsina.

The next day, Fermín is consoling Carmen: Hernán ran away with nearly 2 million dollars in his car as he was fed up with working under his overbearing mother. In spite of that, they use the money to reopen the agricultural cooperative, which guarantees a better life for everyone in Alsina. Rodrigo and Florencia get married and Fermín welcomed the birth of his grandchild.

In a mid-credits scene, Manzi arrives at Fontana's auto shop with a flat tire. Fontana unzips his pants, rubs his mate's bombilla against his crotch, places it in the gourd and offers it to Manzi, who drinks it as his tire is swapped.

== Cast ==
- Ricardo Darín as Fermín Perlassi
- Luis Brandoni as Antonio Fontana
- Chino Darín as Rodrigo Perlassi, Fermín's son
- Verónica Llinás as Lidia Perlassi, Fermín's wife and Rodrigo's mother
- Daniel Aráoz as Belaúnde
- Carlos Belloso as Medina
- Marco Caponi as Hernán
- Rita Cortese as Carmen Largio, Hernán's mother
- Andrés Parra as Fortunato Manzi

Ale Gigena and Guillermo Jacubowicz also appear as the Gómez brothers, while Luciano Cazaux and Ailín Zaninovich appear as Alvarado and Florencia, respectively.

== Production ==
By 2017, Ricardo and Chino Darín's production company Kenya Films had acquired the film rights for the novel La noche de la Usina (2016) by Eduardo Sacheri. Filming took place from October to December 2018 in the Buenos Aires Baradero, Luján and Lobos Partidos. Alejandro Carrillo Penovi, the film's editor, was unavailable during filming, during which Ernesto Feder was asked to assemble a first cut, taking eight weeks. Penovi then continued editing the film for fifteen weeks. At the Panamá International Film Festival in April 2019, Ricardo Darín announced the title as La odisea de los giles, after previous tentative titles La noche de la usina and Los 8 de O'Connor had been considered.

== Reception ==
=== Box office ===
Heroic Losers was released in Argentina on 15 August 2019. During its opening four-day weekend, it sold 403,786 tickets in 482 cinemas, making it the highest-opening domestic film of 2019. After three weeks in cinemas, it became the highest-grossing local film of the year, with more than one million views.

=== Critical response ===
The review aggregator website Rotten Tomatoes reported an approval rating of 93% with an average score of 6.7/10, based on 27 reviews. TodasLasCríticas, which uses a weighted average, assigned the film a score of 76 out of 100 based on 56 critics.

Pablo Scholz of Clarín called the film a "great adaptation" of Sacheri's novel, and praised the cast as "impressively even and talented." María Fernanda Mugica of La Nación wrote, "The script achieves an entertaining plot, interspersed with a reflection about human behavior and featuring characters with whom it is impossible not to empathize," and compared the plot and casting of familiar faces to Ocean's Eleven, although she noted the humor as the weakest aspect of the film.

Further comparisons to Ocean's Eleven appeared throughout English-speaking reviews—referring to Darín's character as "an Argentinean Danny Ocean"—, which also noted the inspiration drawn from How to Steal a Million. Barry Hertz of The Globe and Mail gave the film three out of four stars, and called it "a thoroughly entertaining, if not especially enthralling, cinematic caper". Variety's Scott Tobias wrote, "At close to a full two hours, 'Heroic Losers' takes too much time in the wind-up without the emotional payoffs Borensztein labors so hard to get." However, he praised "its expression of national character." Writing for Screen Daily, Sarah Ward said, "Heroic Losers isn’t heavy on surprises; not in its comfortable rhythms, warm-hued look at rural Argentine struggles, overt fist-pumping moments or reliable performances. Borensztein’s feature also starts slowly, pads out its narrative and doesn’t quite know when to end. And yet, in transforming bleak reality into an uplifting fantasy, this remains a thoroughly likeable movie."

In a more critical review, Luciano Monteagudo of Página/12 considered the film "a new step-back for big-budget Argentine cinema that in recent years—with few exceptions—has taken refuge in the most tested and conservative formulas."

=== Accolades ===
| Award | Date of ceremony | Category | Recipient(s) | Result | Ref(s) |
|---|---|---|---|---|---|
| Ariel Awards | 27 September 2020 | Best Ibero-American Film | Sebastián Borensztein | Nominated | |
| Forqué Awards | 11 January 2020 | Best Latin-American Film | Heroic Losers | Won | |
| Goya Awards | 25 January 2020 | Best Ibero-American Film | Heroic Losers | Won | |
| Grande Prêmio do Cinema Brasileiro | 11 October 2020 | Best Ibero-American Feature Film | Heroic Losers | Won | |
| Havana Film Festival | 14 December 2019 | Grand Coral | Heroic Losers | Nominated | |
| Palm Springs International Film Festival | 11 January 2020 | Best Foreign Language Film | Heroic Losers | Nominated | |
| Platino Awards | 29 June 2020 | Best Actor | Ricardo Darín | Nominated | |
| Platino Awards | 29 June 2020 | Best Film Editing | Alejandro Carrillo Penovi | Nominated | |
| San Sebastián International Film Festival | 28 September 2019 | Golden Shell | Heroic Losers | Nominated | |
| Silver Condor | 25 March 2021 | Best Adapted Screenplay | Sebastián Borensztein and Eduardo Sacheri | Nominated | |
| Silver Condor | 25 March 2021 | Best Costume Design | Julio Suárez | Nominated | |
| Silver Condor | 25 March 2021 | Best Art Direction | Daniel Gimelberg | Nominated | |
| Silver Condor | 25 March 2021 | Best Make-up & Hairstyling | Marisa Amenta and Malvina Mariani | Nominated | |
| Premios Sur | 24 November 2020 | Best Fiction Film | Heroic Losers | Nominated | |
| Premios Sur | 24 November 2020 | Best Director | Sebastián Borensztein | Nominated | |
| Premios Sur | 24 November 2020 | Best Actor | Ricardo Darín | Nominated | |
| Premios Sur | 24 November 2020 | Best Supporting Actor | Carlos Belloso | Nominated | |
| Premios Sur | 24 November 2020 | Best Supporting Actress | Verónica Llinás | Won | |
| Premios Sur | 24 November 2020 | Best Adapted Screenplay | Sebastián Borensztein and Eduardo Sacheri | Nominated | |
| Premios Sur | 24 November 2020 | Best Costume Design | Julio Suárez | Nominated | |
| Premios Sur | 24 November 2020 | Male Revelation | Alejandro Gigena | Nominated | |

== See also ==
- List of Argentine films of 2019
- List of Spanish films of 2019
- List of submissions to the 92nd Academy Awards for Best International Feature Film
- List of Argentine submissions for the Academy Award for Best International Feature Film
