= Semantic Copyright =

Digital Rights Management tool

Semantic Copyright was a Digital Rights Management (DRM) tool that provided semantic information of intellectual property rights of works in digital format, which identifies by its own morphology. The project began in May 2009 after its presentation at the Role of Copyright Registries en Global Digital Networks and its first version was published and released their rights of use and deployment in March 2011. Its development has been developed by the Copyright Registry Safe Creative, the Artificial Intelligence Department of the Technical University of Madrid and Dialnet, supported by Ministry of Industry, Tourism and Trade of Spain. The project was active until 2012, when it was discontinued, and in May 2023 the semanticcopyright.org domain ceased to belong to Safe Creative.

== Framework ==
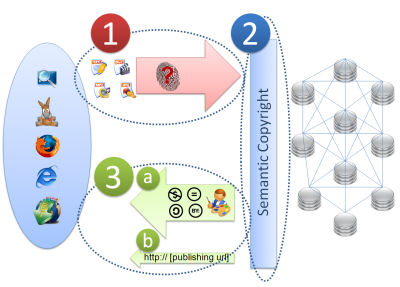
Subsistemas del marco tecnológico Semantic Copyright

It provides a framework based on semantic information, which enables systems to conduct automated telematics intellectual property rights of the files transmitted with content such as text, images, music, video, computer programs, etc. The three subsystems that make up the technological framework that includes Semantic Copyright are:

1. Identification of the work. The external system questioned by any node attached to Semantic Copyright over the copyright of a work. The identification was based on analysis of morphology own digital file containing the work, and it is not necessary that it include metadata or tagging SYSTEMS. Version 1.0 uses to recognize morphological fingerprint files: MD5, MD4 family and Secure Hash Algorithm.
2. Consultation. The external system can direct the query to any node that uses the Semantic Model Copyright.
3. Response. The answer semantics on intellectual property rights consists of two components:
  1. Short answer to the fundamental information of the rights of the work: Author's name and basic features of permits or restrictions on use and dissemination of the work. This information allows the system to devise automated decisions on the distribution or not the same.
  2. Web address included in the detailed semantic information to a specific ontology for the domain of the type of work (literary, art, music, video, etc.).

== See also ==
- Copyright
- Intellectual Property
