= Nicolás Tedeschi =

Argentine footballer

Personal information
- Date of birth: 28 November 1996 (age 29)
- Place of birth: Baradero, Argentina
- Position: Goalkeeper

Team information
- Current team: Defensores Unidos

Youth career
- Independiente
- Defensores Unidos

Senior career*
Years	Team	Apps	(Gls)
2017–	Defensores Unidos	1	(0)
2017	→ Sportivo Baradero (loan)	0	(0)
- * Club domestic league appearances and goals as of 02:17, 24 May 2019 (UTC)

Nicolás Tedeschi (born 28 November 1996) is an Argentine professional footballer who plays as a goalkeeper for Defensores Unidos.

== Career ==
Tedeschi played for the youth system of Independiente, signing in 2014. He subsequently moved to Defensores Unidos of Primera B Metropolitana. In mid-2017, Tedeschi joined Torneo Federal B side Sportivo Baradero on loan. No appearances followed. Tedeschi returned to his parent club and signed a new two-year contract in June 2018. He made his professional bow on 18 May 2019 during a final day encounter with Flandria, appearing for every minute of a 3–1 defeat.

== Career statistics ==
As of 24 May 2019.

Appearances and goals by club, season and competition
Club	Season	League			Cup		League Cup		Continental		Other		Total	
Club	Season	Division	Apps	Goals	Apps	Goals	Apps	Goals	Apps	Goals	Apps	Goals	Apps	Goals
Defensores Unidos	2017–18	Primera C Metropolitana	0	0	0	0	—		—		0	0	0	0
Defensores Unidos	2018–19	Primera B Metropolitana	1	0	0	0	—		—		0	0	1	0
Defensores Unidos	Total		1	0	0	0	—		—		0	0	1	0
Sportivo Baradero (loan)	2017	Torneo Federal B	0	0	0	0	—		—		0	0	0	0
Career total			1	0	0	0	—		—		0	0	1	0
