= The Distinguished Citizen =

2016 film

- Film poster
- El ciudadano ilustre
- Directed by: Gastón Duprat & Mariano Cohn
- Written by: Andrés Duprat
- Starring: Oscar Martínez
- Cinematography: Gastón Duprat & Mariano Cohn
- Music by: Toni M. Mir
- Production companies: Aleph Media; Televisión Abierta; Magma Cine; A Contracorriente Films
- Distributed by: Buena Vista International (Argentina); A Contracorriente Films (Spain)
- Release dates: 4 September 2016 (Venice); 8 September 2016 (Argentine)
- Running time: 118 minutes
- Countries: Argentina; Spain
- Language: Spanish
- Budget: $1.7 million
- Box office: $3.6 million

The Distinguished Citizen (Spanish: El ciudadano ilustre) is a 2016 comedy-drama film directed by Gastón Duprat & Mariano Cohn. It was selected to compete for the Golden Lion at the 73rd Venice International Film Festival. At Venice Oscar Martínez won the Volpi Cup for Best Actor. It was selected as the Argentine entry for the Best Foreign Language Film at the 89th Academy Awards but it was not nominated. It won Best Ibero-American Film at the 4th Platino Awards.

== Plot ==
A recipient of the Nobel Prize for Literature, who has been living in Europe for decades, accepts an invitation from his hometown in Argentina to receive a prize. In his country, the protagonist finds both similarities and irreconcilable differences with the people of his hometown. His novels draw heavily on the people and experiences of his hometown of Salas.

== Cast ==
- Oscar Martínez as Daniel Mantovani
- Dady Brieva as Antonio
- Andrea Frigerio as Irene
- Belén Chavannede as Julia

== Production ==
The Distinguished Citizen took five years to produce and had a budget of $1.7M US. Screenwriter Andres Duprat proposed the story based on his experiences as an art curator jurying work in small towns. Martinez was an early consideration for the lead and collaborated on the script. He called the fictional town of Salas an uncomfortable mirror of Argentina, and Montovani's exile in Spain reminiscent of Jorge Luis Borges's time spent in Europe.

Shooting took place over eight weeks, primarily in Navarro, known in the film as Salas. The directors chose the pueblo after considering 58 municipalities, citing the town's historic center, scarce traffic, lagoon, club, town square, and small television channel. Other locations included Lobos for the flat tire scene, the El Trébol club in Villa Urquiza for the author's lectures, and the Teatro Opera in Buenos Aires for the Nobel awards sequence.

A book of the same title purportedly written by the film character Mantovani describing his visit to his hometown was published in Argentina ahead of the film. The directors described the actual but anonymous author as a "heavyweight of the literary world".

The film also features two commercials created by Argentine advertiser and television personality Norbert Degoas.

== Reception ==
=== Critical reception ===
On review aggregator website Rotten Tomatoes, the film holds an approval rating of 100%, based on 12 reviews, and an average rating of 6.9/10.

=== Accolades ===
Award	Date of ceremony	Category	Recipients and nominees	Result
Venice Film Festival	10 September 2016	Volpi Cup for Best Actor	Oscar Martínez	Won
Venice Film Festival	10 September 2016	Golden Lion	Gastón Duprat & Mariano Cohn	Nominated
Haifa International Film Festival	October 2016	Best Film in International Competition	Gastón Duprat & Mariano Cohn	Won
Havana Film Festival	18 December 2016	Best Screenplay	Andrés Duprat	Won
Forqué Awards	14 January 2017	Best Actor	Oscar Martínez	Nominated
Forqué Awards	14 January 2017	Best Latin-American Film		Won
Goya Awards	4 February 2017	Best Ibero-American Film	Gastón Duprat & Mariano Cohn	Won
Ariel Awards	11 July 2017	Best Ibero-American Film	Gastón Duprat & Mariano Cohn	Won
Platino Awards	22 July 2017	Best Ibero-American Film	Gastón Duprat & Mariano Cohn	Won
Platino Awards	22 July 2017	Best Director	Gastón Duprat & Mariano Cohn	Nominated
Platino Awards	22 July 2017	Best Actor	Oscar Martínez	Won
Platino Awards	22 July 2017	Best Screenplay	Andrés Duprat	Won

== See also ==
- List of submissions to the 89th Academy Awards for Best Foreign Language Film
- List of Argentine submissions for the Academy Award for Best Foreign Language Film
