= Filmoteca Española =

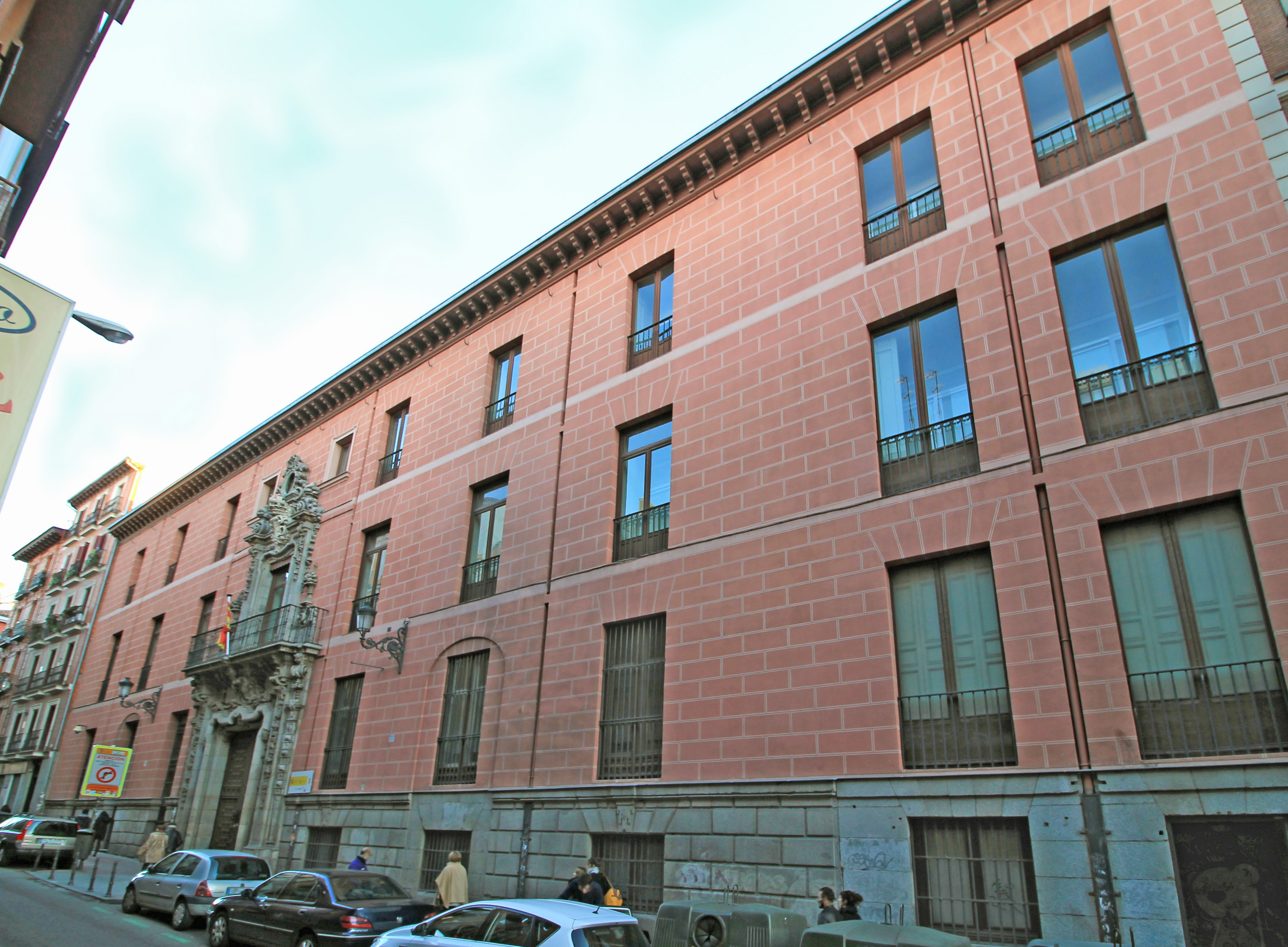
- Administrative headquarters
- Headquarters: Palacio de Perales (administrative premises); Cine Doré (movie theater); Pozuelo de Alarcón (Film Archive)

The Filmoteca Española (English: Spanish Film Library) is an official institution of the Spanish Ministry of Culture. Its objective is to restore, investigate and conserve the film heritage of Spain and its diffusion. It is part of the Institute of Cinematography and Audiovisual Arts.

== Sites ==
Its cinema where films are daily shown is Cine Doré (filmed by Pedro Almodóvar in Hable con ella), in Santa Isabel Street, Madrid, designed by architect Críspulo Moro Cabeza and built in 1923. It was restored from 1982 to 1990. The archive, offices, library and exhibition halls are set in a restored palace on Magdalena St nº 10 in Madrid.

Filmoteca has two other venues, the CCR (Conservation and Restoration Center) in Pozuelo de Alarcón, on the outskirts of Madrid and the administrative headquarters in the Palacio de Perales in the center of the city of Madrid.

== Direction ==
At present the director of Filmoteca is Valeria Camporesi, Spanish-Italian film historian, professor and researcher.

== Film collection ==
The total of existing titles in the archives of the Filmoteca Española currently amounts to approximately 36,000. In addition to approximately another 12,000 pre-cataloged titles. Of the 36,000 titles already cataloged, approximately 21,000 are of Spanish production, and the rest are foreigners.

In total 205,000 materials, both in photochemical support (about 600,000 containers) and in electronic support.

70,500 rolls of film belonging to audiovisual documents of the NO-DO archive are also stored in its vaults.

== See also ==
- Cinema of Spain
- List of film archives
