= Santa Coloma, Buenos Aires =

Santa Coloma
- Town
- Location within Buenos Aires Province
- Coordinates: 34°03′43″S 59°33′25″W
- Country: Argentina
- Province: Buenos Aires
- Partidos: Baradero
- Established: 1912
- Elevation: 39 m (128 ft)

Population (2001 Census)
  - Total: 169
- Time zone: UTC−3 (ART)
- CPA Base: B 2761
- Climate: Dfc

Santa Coloma is a town located in the Baradero Partido in the province of Buenos Aires, Argentina.

== History ==
Santa Coloma was founded in 1912 following the construction of a train station operated by the Belgrano Railway. The town was given its modern name in 1930.

== Population ==
According to INDEC, which collects population data for the country, the town had a population of 169 people as of the 2001 census.
