= Adolfo Castelo =

Argentinian journalist and television host

Adolfo Castelo

Adolfo Castelo (August 29, 1935 – November 23, 2004) was a journalist and television host in Argentina.

Castelo was born in Buenos Aires, and started working in graphic journalism. He was the creator of several publications, including the political journalism magazine TXT, which he edited until his death. He also participated in memorable television shows in Argentina, such as Semanario Insólito and La noticia rebelde, and the radio programme El ventilador during the 1990s with Jorge Guinzburg and Carlos Ulanovsky; and Turno tarde; and Mirá lo que te digo since 2001. He also took part in Jorge Lanata's show Día D.

Castelo was one of the pioneers in Argentine television to mix informative journalism with humour, together with colleagues Raúl Becerra, Jorge Guinzburg and Carlos Abrevaya.

Castelo was diagnosed with lung cancer in 2003, upon returning from a trip to Galicia (Spain), birthplace of his parents. In October 2004 he was declared an honorary citizen of Buenos Aires, shortly before his death.
