= Cine Doré =

Cinema in Madrid, Spain

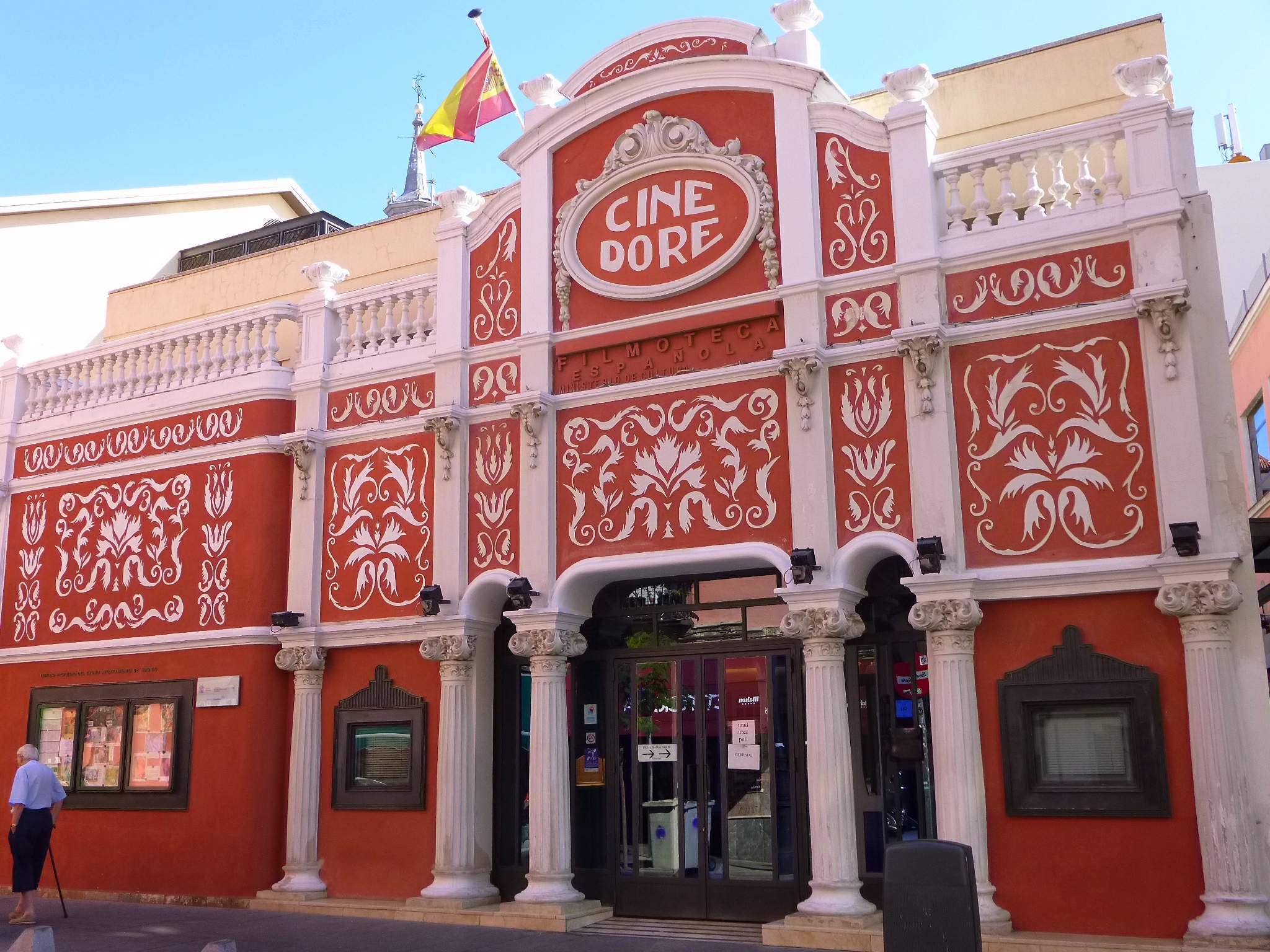
- Cine Doré's façade to Santa Isabel Street
- Interactive map of Cine Doré
- Address: Calle de Santa Isabel 3 Madrid, Spain
- Coordinates: 40.411657645811886°N 3.6990259770569045°W
- Type: Movie theater
- Event: Modernismo

Tenant
- Filmoteca Española

The Cine Doré is a cinema in Madrid, Spain. It is currently used for Filmoteca Española screenings.

== History ==
Envisioned as a "socio-cultural hall", the original venue was commissioned by Mariano Tejero Ruiz in 1912. Years later, in 1922, it was rebuilt as a cinema hall by architect Críspulo Moro Cabeza. It fell into disuse in the 1960s. The modernista façade managed to endure the vicissitudes of 20th-century Spain (including the Civil War), and the venue was rehabilitated by Javier Feduchi in 1984.

In 1989, after a 26 year closure, the Cine Doré re-opened as the venue for Filmoteca Española screenings.
