= Forqué Awards =

Series of film and television awards

- Current: 30th Forqué Awards
- Awarded for: Merits of Spanish film and television productions
- Country: Spain
- Presented by: EGEDA
- First award: 1996
- Website: https://www.premiojosemariaforque.com

The Forqué Awards or José María Forqué Awards (Spanish: Premios Forqué, also Premios Cinematográficos José María Forqué) are film and television awards presented by the association of audiovisual producers EGEDA, honoring the best of Spanish cinema and television.

== History ==
Created in 1996, they are named after Spanish filmmaker and producer José María Forqué. In the 15th edition (2010), the awards started recognising performances (initially a single non-gender category to Best Performance). Since the 19th edition (2014), the awards include a category recognising the best Latin-American film. The TV categories were added in the 26th edition.

== Editions ==
- 20th Forqué Awards
- 21st Forqué Awards (Palacio Municipal de Congresos, Madrid, 11 January 2016)
- 22nd Forqué Awards (Teatro de la Maestranza, Seville, 14 January 2017)
- 23rd Forqué Awards (Palacio de Congresos, Zaragoza, 13 January 2018)
- 24th Forqué Awards (Palacio de Congresos, Zaragoza, 12 January 2019)
- 25th Forqué Awards (Palacio Municipal de Congresos, Madrid, 11 January 2020)
- 26th Forqué Awards (Palacio Municipal de Congresos, Madrid, 16 January 2021)
- 27th Forqué Awards (IFEMA Palacio Municipal, Madrid 11 December 2021)
- 28th Forqué Awards (IFEMA Palacio Municipal, Madrid, 17 December 2022)
- 29th Forqué Awards (IFEMA Palacio Municipal, Madrid, 16 December 2023)
- 30th Forqué Awards (IFEMA Palacio Municipal, Madrid, 14 December 2024)
- 31st Forqué Awards (IFEMA Palacio Municipal, Madrid, 13 December 2025)
- 32nd Forqué Awards (IFEMA Palacio Municipal, Madrid, 19 December 2026)

== Winners ==
=== Best Film ===
- 1st: Nadie hablará de nosotras cuando hayamos muerto (Nobody Will Speak of Us When We're Dead)
- 2nd: Tesis
- 3rd: La buena estrella (The Lucky Star)
- 4th: Barrio
- 5th: Solas
- 6th: El Bola
- 7th: En construcción
- 8th: Los lunes al sol (Mondays in the Sun)
- 9th: Te doy mis ojos (Take My Eyes)
- 10th: Mar adentro (The Sea Inside)
- 11th: La vida secreta de las palabras (The Secret Life of Words)
- 12th: El laberinto del fauno (Pan's Labyrinth)
- 13th: El orfanato (The Orphanage)
- 14th: Camino
- 15th: Celda 211 (Cell 211)
- 16th: Buried
- 17th: No habrá paz para los malvados (No Rest for the Wicked)
- 18th: Blancanieves (Snow White)
- 19th: La herida (Wounded)
- 20th: La isla mínima (Marshland)
- 21st: Truman
- 22nd: Tarde para la ira (The Fury of a Patient Man)
- 23rd: The Bookshop & El autor (The Motive)
- 24th: Campeones (Champions)
- 25th: La trinchera infinita (The Endless Trench)
- 26th: Las niñas (Schoolgirls)
- 27th: El buen patrón (The Good Boss)
- 28th: As bestas (The Beasts)
- 29th: 20.000 especies de abejas (20,000 Species of Bees)
- 30th: El 47 (The 47)
- 31st: Los domingos (Sundays)

=== Best Latin-American Film ===
- 19th: Wakolda (The German Doctor)
- 20th: Relatos salvajes (Wild Tales)
- 21st: El club (The Club)
- 22nd: El ciudadano ilustre (The Distinguished Citizen)
- 23rd: Una mujer fantástica (A Fantastic Woman)
- 24th: Roma
- 25th: La odisea de los giles (Heroic Losers)
- 26th: Nuevo orden (New Order)
- 27th: Noche de fuego (Prayers for the Stolen)
- 28th: Argentina, 1985
- 29th: La memoria infinita (The Eternal Memory)
- 30th: El lugar de la otra (In Her Place)
- 31st: Belén

== EGEDA Gold Medal ==
In addition to the competitive awards, EGEDA also honours a career in the audiovisual industry every edition by gifting a gold medal (usually announced in advance). A list with some of the recipients of the honorary award is as follows:

- 16th: Luis Megino
- 17th: Fernando Trueba
- 18th: Gerardo Herrero
- 19th: Agustín Almodóvar
- 20th: RTVE
- 21st: Santiago Segura
- 22nd: Antonio Pérez
- 23rd: Carlos Saura
- 24th: José Frade
- 25th: Gonzalo Suárez
- 26th: Fernando Colomo & Beatriz de la Gándara
- 27th: José Antonio Félez
- 28th: José Luis Bermúdez de Castro
- 29th: Eduardo Campoy
- 30th: José Luis Garci
- 31st: Emma Lustres
