= Baradero Partido =

Baradero Partido de Baradero
- Department
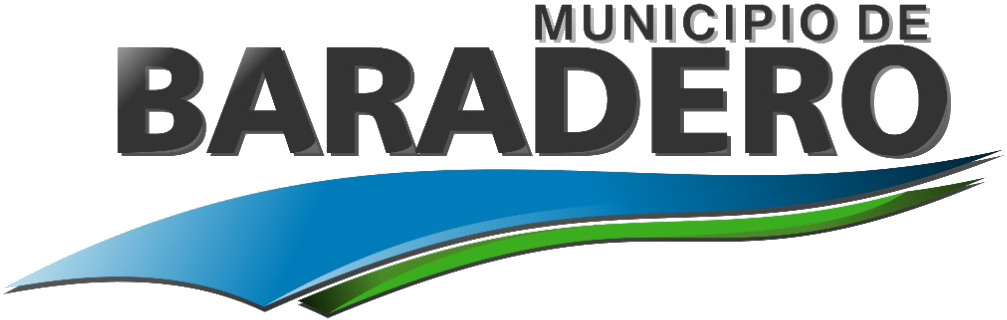

- Location of Baradero Partido in Buenos Aires Province
- Coordinates: 33°50′S 59°32′W
- Country: Argentina
- Established: July 25, 1615
- Seat: Baradero

Government
  - Intendant: Esteban Sanzio (PJ)

Area
  - Total: 1,514 km^{2} (585 sq mi)

Population
  - Total: 29,562
  - Density: 19.53/km^{2} (50.57/sq mi)
- Demonym: baradense
- Postal Code: B2492
- IFAM: BUE010
- Area Code: 03329
- Website: {{URL|example.com|optional display text}}

Baradero Partido is a partido of Buenos Aires Province in Argentina.

The provincial subdivision has a population of 29,562 inhabitants in an area of 1,514 km^{2} (585 sq mi), and its capital city is Baradero, which is to the north west of Buenos Aires.

The district was founded on July 25, 1615, making it one of the oldest partidos in Buenos Aires Province.

== Towns ==
- Baradero
- Irineo Portela
- Santa Coloma
- Villa Alsina
