= Unusual Weekly =

Unusual Weekly (Spanish: Semanario insólito) was a satirical Argentinian television program which aired from 1982 and 1983 on ATC (Channel 7). It marked a milestone in the television of the country, and gained a cult following.

It was created by Carlos A. Aguilar, who was also the executive producer, and was succeeded by Raúl Becerra. The show debuted presenters from Becerra, such as Adolfo Castelo, Virginia Hanglin and Raúl Portal.

It featured sketches and segments, most notably, Surveys on the street and Happening magazine (which humorously analysed press releases); such formats werre later were used in succeeding programs, and even to some extent in the humorous pieces current affairs news.

The format was later adapted by The Rebellious News and turned into a successful genre, like programs such as Whoever May Fall, Television Registered and Informal Mornings, among others.

== Bibliography ==
- Nielsen, Jorge (2004). La magia de la televisión argentina. Argentina: Ediciones del Jilguero. ISBN 9879416066.
- Sirvén, Pablo (1998). Quien te ha visto y quien TV. Argentina: Ediciones de la Flor. ISBN 9789500734578.
- Yofre, Juan B. (2011). Malvinas, documentos secretos. Argentina: Penguin Random House. ISBN 978-9500737081.
