= Semantic knowledge management =

In computer science, semantic knowledge management is a set of practices that seeks to classify content so that the knowledge it contains may be immediately accessed and transformed for delivery to the desired audience, in the required format. This classification of content is semantic in its nature – identifying content by its type or meaning within the content itself and via external, descriptive metadata – and is achieved by employing XML technologies.

The specific outcomes of these practices are:

- Maintain content for multiple audiences together in a single document
- Transform content into various delivery formats without re-authoring
- Search for content more effectively
- Involve more subject-matter experts in the creation of content without reducing quality
- Reduce production costs for delivery formats
- Reduce the manual administration of getting the right knowledge to the right people
- Reduce the cost and time to localize content

== Notable semantic knowledge management systems ==
- Learn eXact
- Thinking Cap LCMS
- Thinking Cap LMS
- Xyleme LCMS
- iMapping
