= Baradero =

Town in Buenos Aires Province, Argentina

- Town
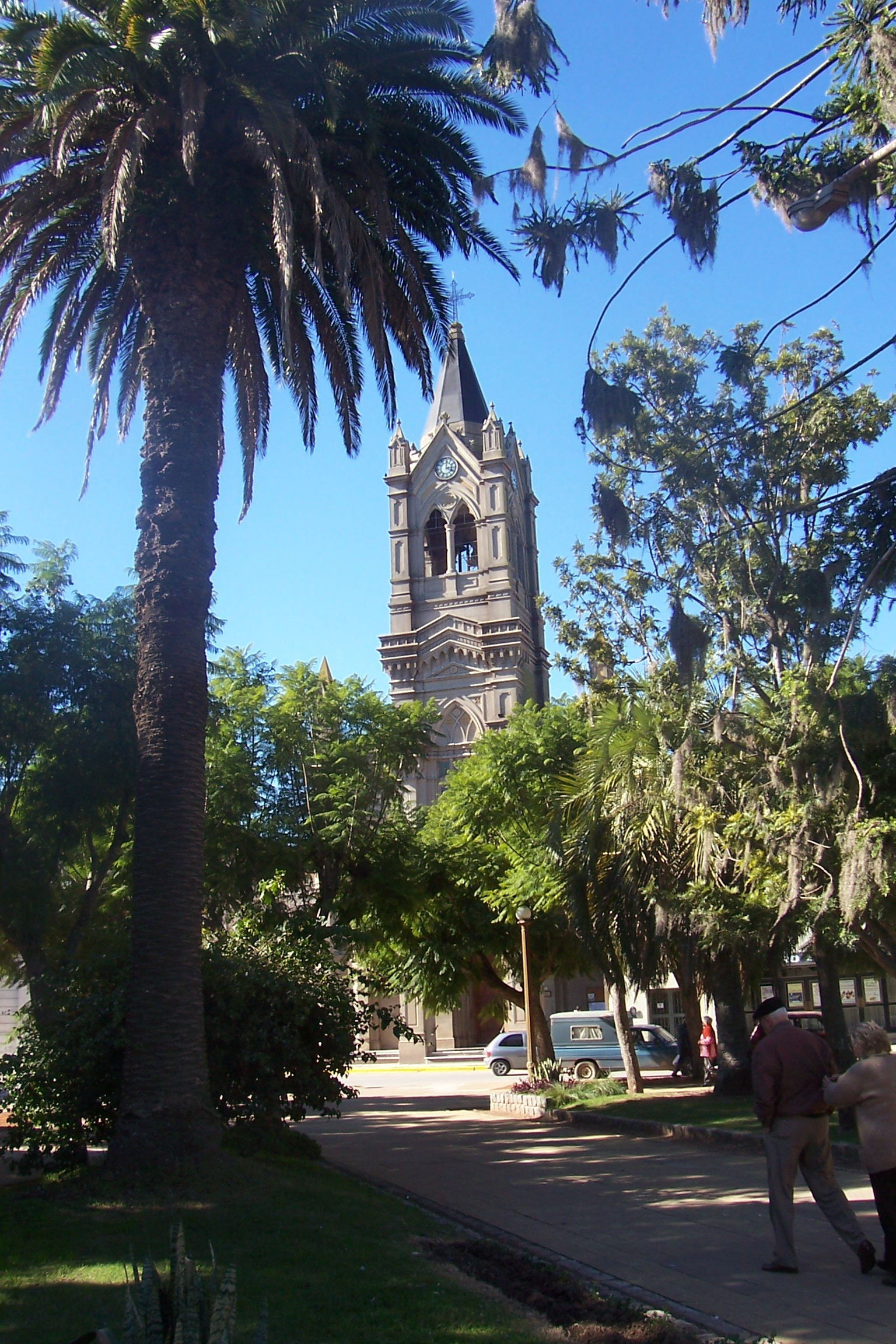
- Baradero Church

- Location in Argentina
- Coordinates: 33°48′S 59°31′W
- Country: Argentina
- Province: Buenos Aires
- Partido: Baradero
- Founded: July 25, 1615
- Elevation: 41 m (135 ft)

Population (2010 census)
  - Total: 28,537
- CPA Base: B 2942
- Area code: +54 3329
- Climate: Cfa

Baradero is the oldest town of Buenos Aires Province, Argentina, being founded in 1615. It is the administrative centre for Baradero Partido.

== Geography ==
It is located on the bank of the Baradero River which is a tributary of the Paraná River.

== Notable people ==
- Nicolás Tedeschi (born 1996) - footballer

== Gallery ==
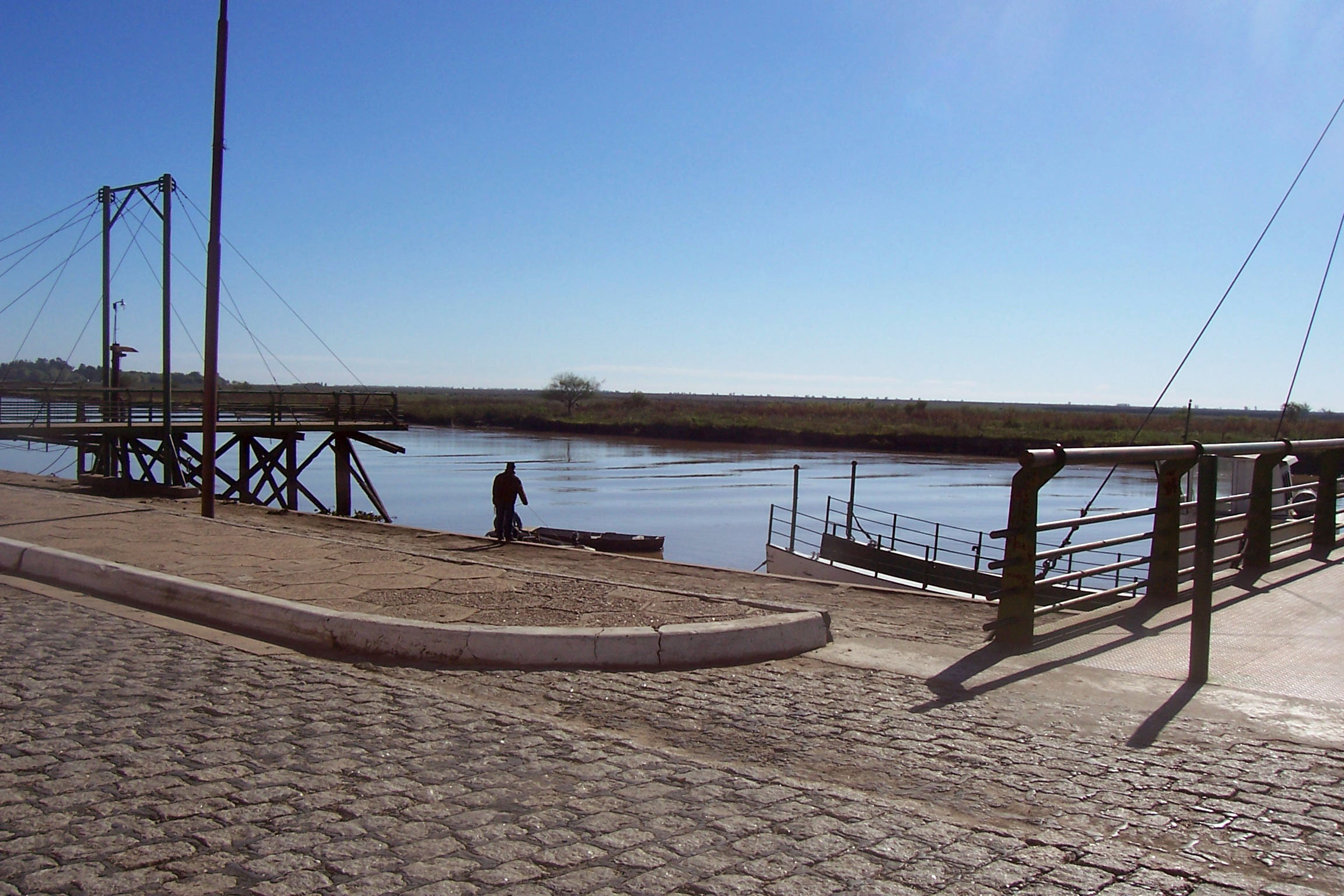
View of the Río Baradero

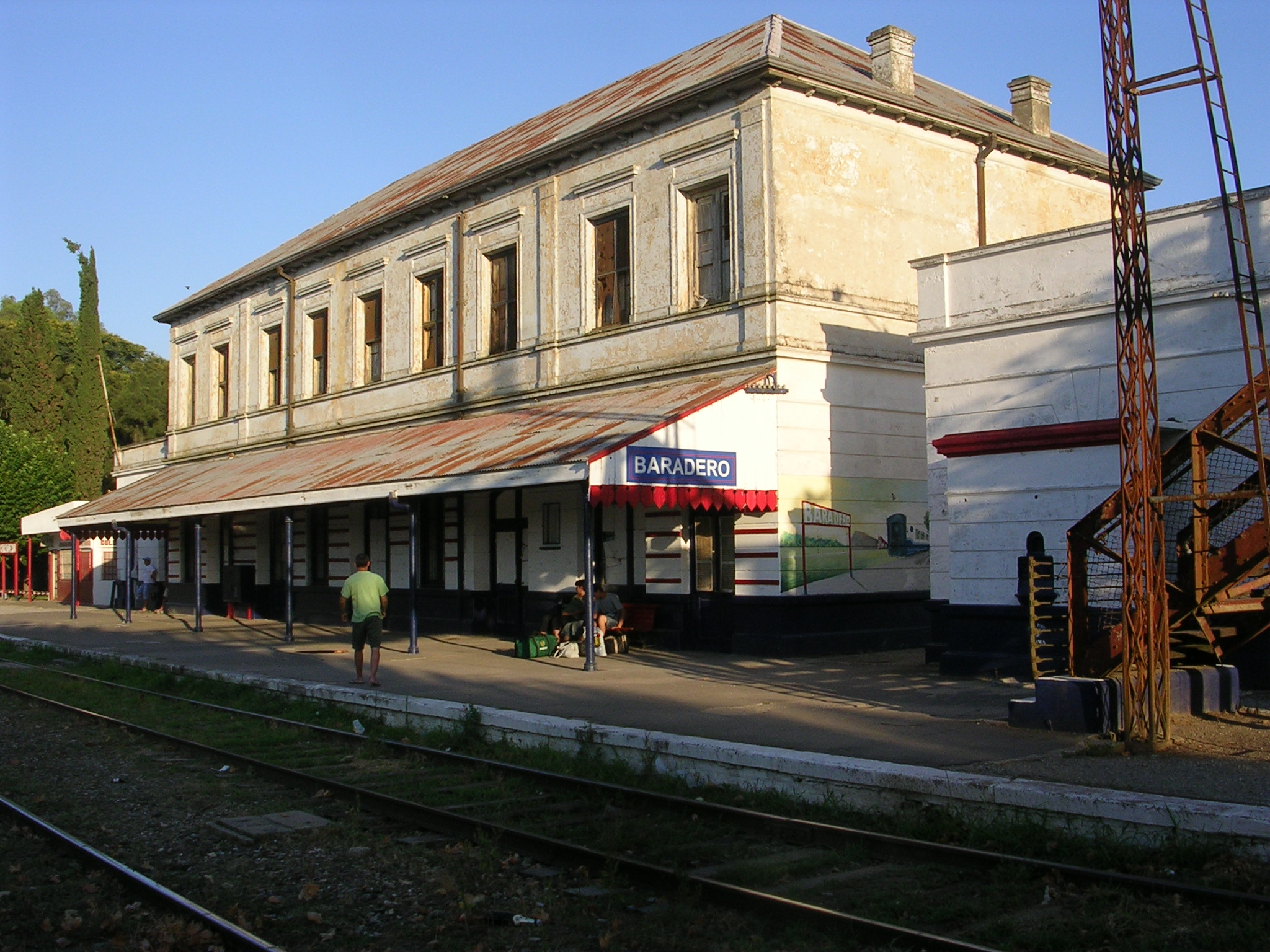
Baradero station
