= Elena S. Sánchez =

Spanish journalist and television presenter

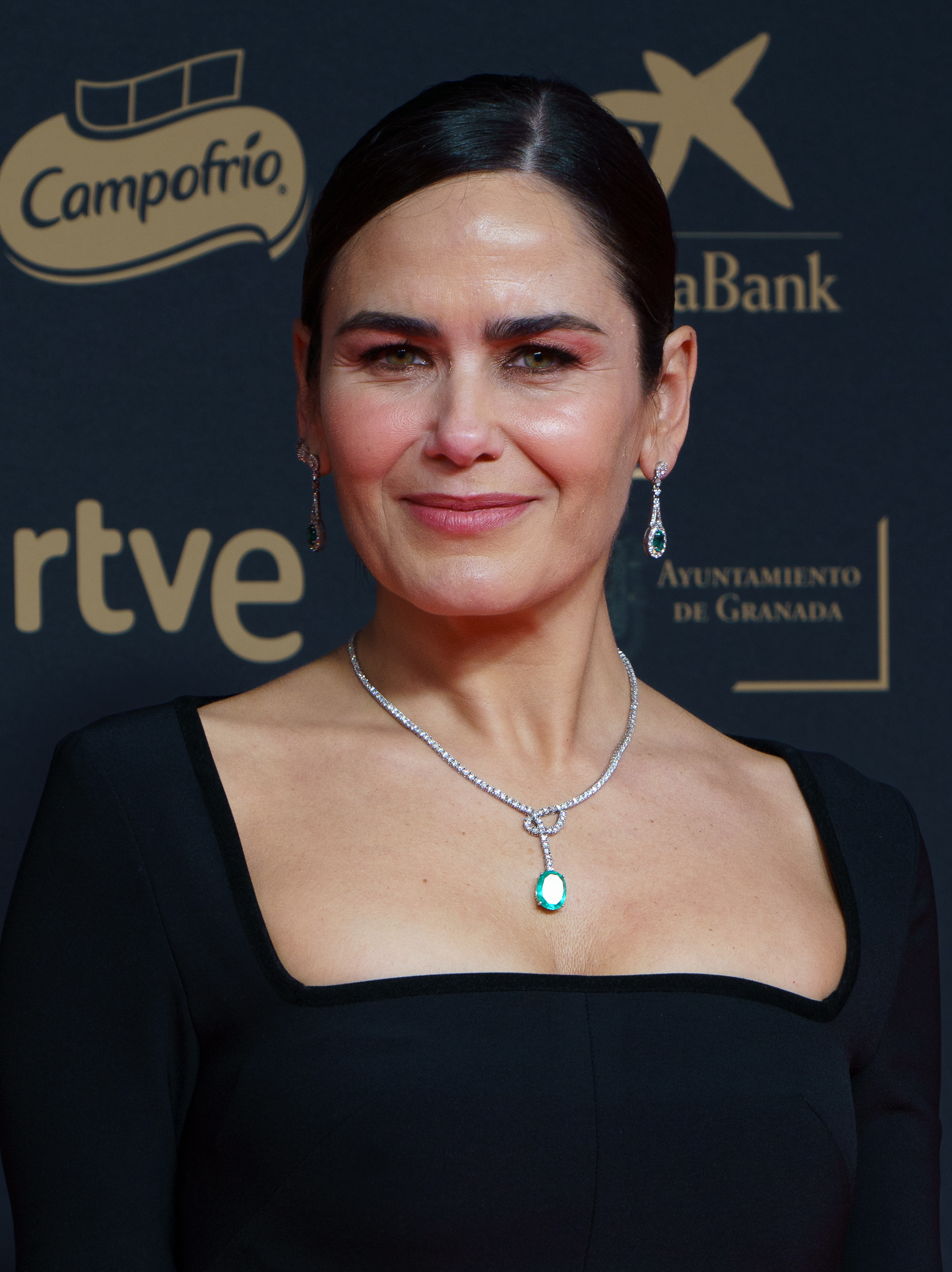
Sánchez at the red carpet of the 39th Goya Awards in 2025

Elena Sánchez Sánchez (born 29 May 1979), usually credited as Elena S. Sánchez, is a Spanish journalist and television presenter, associated to both the public broadcaster RTVE and entertainment journalism.

== Biography ==
Born on 29 May 1979, (Note: Cited birthplaces include "Toledo" and "Ávila".) she was raised in Gavilanes, in the province of Ávila. She earned a degree in journalism from the Complutense University of Madrid. She worked in her early career for Diario de Ávila, Onda Cero and Antena 3.

She made her debut in RTVE in Tendido cero, specializing in cultural information. Attached to the cultural newscast services of the Spanish public broadcaster, Sánchez has presented television shows such as La tarde en 24 horas, Días de cine, Corazón (as replacement of Anne Igartiburu), Gente, Sánchez y Carbonell, Cine de barrio (as replacement of Concha Velasco), or Historia de nuestro cine, Vive San Fermín, and is also a recurring reporter at the Goya Awards red carpet. In 2022, she was appointed as director of Historia de nuestro cine, of which she was also the host since 2015.
