= Safe Creative =

Digital copyright registration service

- Website type: Copyright registration service
- Website: https://safecreative.org
- Commercial: Yes
- Registration: Free and paid
- Launched: 2007
- Current status: Active

Safe Creative is a digital copyright registration service to show evidence of copyright registration for the owners of the creative material in the case of plagiarism or misuse of copyrighted materials.

Jamendo, dibujando.net, talentyArt, and VirtualGallery have partnered with Safe Creative.

== Features ==
The service includes copyleft and "all rights reserved", with a Semantic Copyright framework implemented. It has movies and TV formats registration with the collaboration of Spanish movies and TV producers, copyright-collecting society EGEDA, and Spain National Registrars.

The authorship evidence is based on the deposit of the work; redundant hash; (MD5, SHA-1, SHA512) from the deposited file; and redundant timestamp of the time and hour or registration. It has an open API interface for the recording of authorship claims and queries from external systems.

== Reception ==
Plagiarism Today praised the website for having a "rich API" and being "feature rich", but stated that the website could be "confusing and intimidating to use" for those inexperienced with copyrighting.

== See also ==
- Semantic Copyright
