= EGEDA =

Spanish audiovisual producers' rights management organisation

- Entidad de Gestión de Derechos de los Productores Audiovisuales
- Abbreviation: EGEDA
- Formation: 18 September 1990; 35 years ago
- Type: Copyright collective
- Purpose: Collective management of audiovisual producers' intellectual-property rights
- Headquarters: Pozuelo de Alarcón, Community of Madrid, Spain
- Region served: Spain and Ibero-America
- President: Enrique Cerezo
- Website: www.egeda.es

EGEDA (Spanish: Entidad de Gestión de Derechos de los Productores Audiovisuales, lit. 'Audiovisual Producers' Rights Management Entity') is a Spanish copyright collective that administers intellectual-property rights on behalf of film, television and other audiovisual producers. Based in Pozuelo de Alarcón, near Madrid, it licenses uses of works in its repertoire, collects remuneration and distributes the resulting revenue to rightsholders. The organisation was established in 1990 and was authorised by the Spanish Ministry of Culture on 29 October of that year.

EGEDA has participated in the creation of affiliated or related collective-management organisations in Latin America and maintains representation agreements with foreign societies. In addition to rights management, it has developed film-industry initiatives including the Forqué Awards, the online film service Filmotech and, with the Ibero-American Federation of Film and Audiovisual Producers (FIPCA), the Platino Awards.

== Functions and legal status ==
EGEDA is one of the collective-management organisations authorised by Spain's Ministry of Culture under the country's intellectual-property legislation. Its constituency is audiovisual producers, as distinct from organisations representing authors, performers or music producers. Membership is voluntary, but some of the rights administered under Spanish law are subject to mandatory collective management.

The organisation's core work includes licensing and collecting payment for retransmission and other forms of communication to the public involving audiovisual works. A significant area of its Spanish licensing activity has concerned television and other audiovisual content made available in hotel rooms. It also administers revenue received from counterpart organisations abroad and represents foreign rightsholders in Spain through reciprocal agreements. EGEDA is a member of the Geneva-based Association of International Collective Management of Audiovisual Works (AGICOA).

The World Intellectual Property Organization (WIPO) Arbitration and Mediation Center operates an expedited-arbitration procedure adapted to disputes between EGEDA rightsholders who make competing claims to exploitation rights in the same work. Arbitration is optional after EGEDA's internal settlement and recommendation procedure has concluded.

== History ==
EGEDA was constituted in Spain on 18 September 1990. A ministerial order authorising it to operate as an intellectual-property rights management organisation was issued on 29 October and published in the Boletín Oficial del Estado on 2 November 1990. It began collecting rights revenue in 1993.

In 1996, the organisation created the José María Forqué Awards, named after film director and producer José María Forqué, EGEDA's first president. The awards were intended to recognise Spanish audiovisual productions and the role of producers in the industry. Film producer and distributor Enrique Cerezo became EGEDA's president in 1998.

From 2001, EGEDA became increasingly involved in establishing collective-management organisations for producers in Ibero-American countries. EGEDA US was established in Los Angeles in 2007 to manage relationships with US members and act as a link between the United States and the Spanish and Latin American audiovisual industries. Organisations using the EGEDA name have subsequently operated in a number of Latin American countries, while reciprocal agreements extend the repertoire represented in each territory.

In March 2007, EGEDA launched Filmotech, a legal download service initially offering about 250 Spanish feature films, short films, documentaries and animated works. Its catalogue combined recent titles with Spanish film classics, and its launch was presented as both a new distribution window and an alternative to unauthorised file sharing. The service later adopted streaming and operated until 2019.

EGEDA was among the organisations that formed the Coalition of Creators and Content Industries (Coalición de Creadores e Industrias de Contenidos) in 2008. The coalition brought together organisations from the film, music, publishing and video-game sectors to lobby for enforcement and legislative measures against online copyright infringement.

EGEDA and FIPCA announced the Platino Awards in 2013 as an annual programme recognising cinema from across Ibero-America. The first ceremony was held in Panama City in April 2014. The awards later expanded to include television productions and have been held in several countries.

== Legal proceedings and competition ruling ==
EGEDA has been involved in litigation concerning the extent and financing of audiovisual producers' rights. In EGEDA and Others v Administración del Estado (C-470/14), EGEDA and several other Spanish collecting societies challenged Spain's system of financing compensation for private copying from the general state budget. In June 2016, the Court of Justice of the European Union held that European Union law precluded that system because it did not ensure that the cost was borne only by natural persons entitled to make private copies; legal persons also contributed through general taxation without an exemption or reimbursement mechanism.

A separate competition case concerned EGEDA's tariffs for public communication of audiovisual works in hotel rooms. Following a complaint by the Spanish hotel association CEHAT, Spain's competition authority found in 2012 that EGEDA had abused its dominant position by setting unfair, excessive and discriminatory tariffs. It imposed a fine of €478,515. The Audiencia Nacional upheld the finding of infringement in 2016 but ordered the fine to be recalculated. The Supreme Court rejected EGEDA's further appeal in November 2017, and in 2018 the National Commission on Markets and Competition reimposed the €478,515 fine after recalculation.

== See also ==
- Copyright law of Spain
- Forqué Awards
- Platino Awards
