= Carolina Bang =

Spanish actress

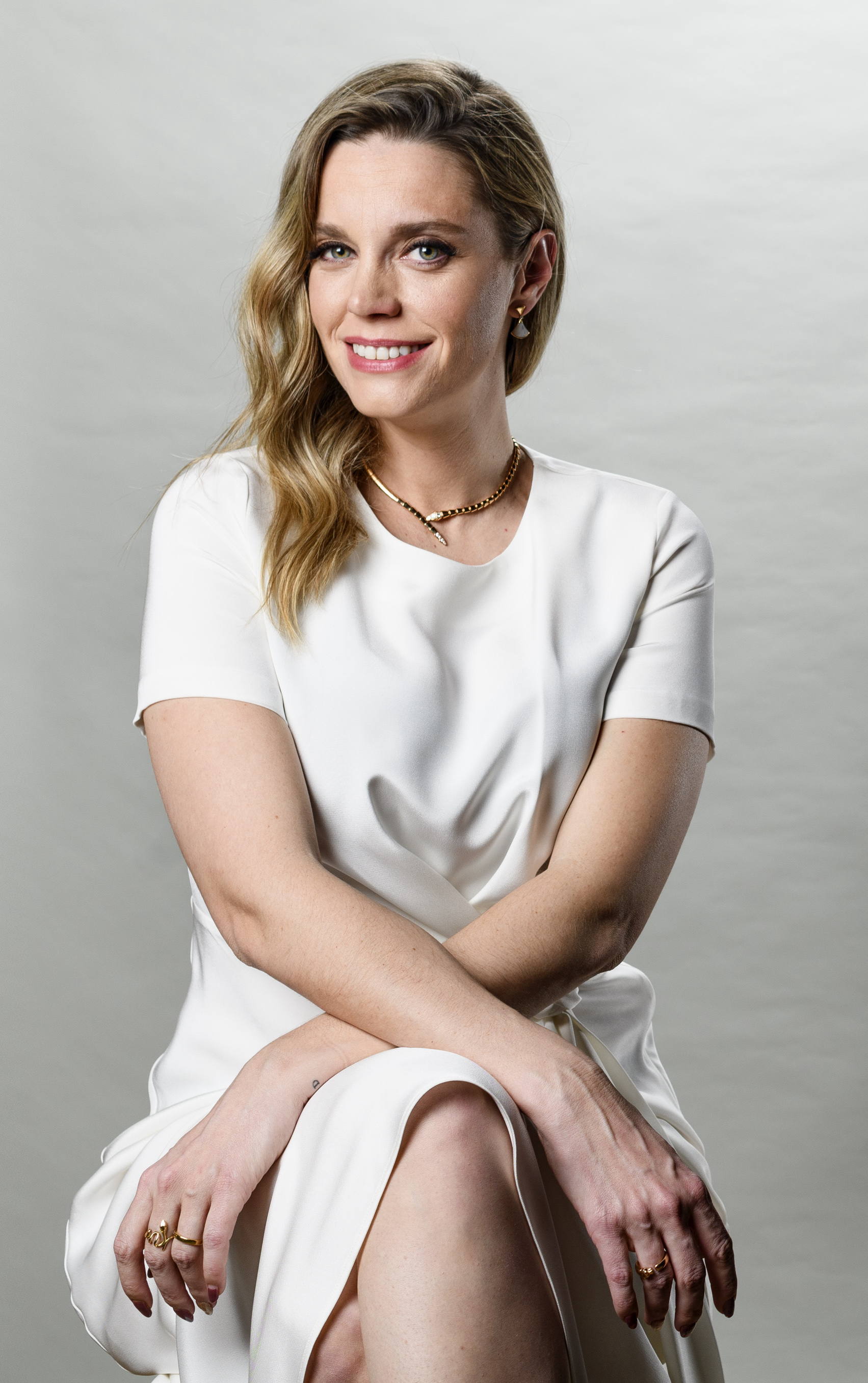
- Carolina Bang at the 67th Berlin International Film Festival.
- Born: Carolina Bang Herrera; 21 September 1985 (age 41); Santa Cruz de Tenerife, Canary Islands, Spain
- Education: Instituto del Cine Madrid
- Occupations: Actress, model, media producer
- Years active: 2005–present
- Spouse: Álex de la Iglesia (m. 2014)
- Children: 1

Carolina Herrera Bang (born 21 September 1985) is a Spanish actress and film producer. She was nominated for the Goya Award for Best New Actress in 2010.

== Career ==
Carolina Bang was born in Santa Cruz de Tenerife on 21 September 1985, into a family with a Norwegian mother and a Spanish father. As a child, her family moved to Madrid, where she graduated in technical architecture at the Polytechnic University while concurrently studying acting at the Film Institute.

Her early endeavors in entertainment were as a member of the theater company Proyecto Katharis — where she remained for six years — and as a TV host on La Sexta's program "El Intermedio". In 2008, she transitioned to television acting with her first leading role in the series "Plutón BRB Nero," portraying Lorna.

In 2010, she received a nomination to the Goya Award for Best New Actress for her performance in The Last Circus. In 2011, she joined the cast of the Telecinco series The Land of Wolves. In 2013, Bang starred in the film Witching & Bitching, directed by Álex de la Iglesia. A year later, she appeared in the Antena 3 series Velvet, and in the film Shrew's Nest. In 2016, participated in the second season of the series Víctor Ros, and in 2017, she was part of the cast of the film Skins directed by Eduardo Casanova, and starred in the Playz series Dorien, marking one of her last works as an actress.

Carolina Bang's most prestigious facet is as a film producer, with over twenty credits in feature films and television series, most of them originated in her own company: Pokeepsie Films, founded in 2014 with her husband, film director and producer Álex de la Iglesia. She has produced notable titles in recent Spanish cinema, generally encompassing the horror, comedy, thriller, and film noir genres. Among the most prominent films are The Heroes of Evil, Errementari, Perfect Strangers, Four's a Crowd, Shrew's Nest, 70 Big Ones as well as the HBO Max series 30 Coins. For HBO Max, Carolina Bang also served as executive producer for Headless Chickens a comedy series set in the world of elite football.

Additionally, she produced the successful first installment of the film trilogy My Fault that became the most-watched non-English language film in the history of Prime Video worldwide. Carolina Bang is also the producer of comedian Eva Hache's directorial debut, Un mal día lo tiene cualquiera.

In 2020, it was announced that Pokeepsie Films partnered with Sony Pictures and Amazon Prime Video to create "The Fear Collection", a label of full-length horror films with worldwide distribution. The first two movies of "The Fear Collection" were Venicephrenia, directed by Álex de la Iglesia and released in April 2022, and Venus by Jaume Balagueró. The third, Anatema by Jimina Sabadú, is slated for release in 2024. That same year, the Pokeepsie Films series for Netflix titled 1992 will be launched.

Recently, she received the S.S. Venture lifetime achievement award at the Isla Calavera festival in Tenerife, an award that seeks to recognize the trajectory of those Canarians who have taken their talent from the archipelago to the boundaries of the genre.

== Filmography ==
=== Acting roles ===
Year	English title	Spanish title	Format	Role	Notes
2007	Madrid – Moscow	Madrid – Moscú	Short film	Girl	
2008	Tell Me that I	Dime que yo	Short film	Former girlfriend	
2008	The Storymaker	El forjador de historias	Short film	Nurse	
2008	Pluto B.R.B. Nero	Plutón B.R.B. Nero	TV series	Lorna	2008–09
2009	Paco's Men	Los hombres de Paco	TV series	Maya Azcárate	1 episode
2009	The Successful Pells	Los exitosos Pells	TV series	Marina Fernández	
2010	The Last Circus	Balada Triste de Trompeta	Film	Natalia	Nominated—Goya Award for Best New Actress
2011	036	036	Short film	Susana	
2011	Rasputin's Dagger	La daga de Rasputín	Film	Ludmila	
2011	Aida	Aída	TV series	Herself	1 episode
2011	The Land of Wolves	Tierra de lobos	TV series	Inés	2011–14
2011	As Luck Would Have It	La chispa de la vida	Film	Pilar	
2012	Pascal's Bet	La apuesta de Pascal	Short film	Estefanía	
2013	Witching & Bitching	Las brujas de Zugarramurdi	Film	Eva	
2014	Change of the Route	Cambio de ruta	Film	Julia	
2014	Shrew's Nest	Musarañas	Film	Elisa	
2014	Blind Dates	Ciega a citas	TV series	Covadonga	
2014	Velvet	Velvet	TV series	Verónica Lago	1 episode
2014	Menu for Two	Dos a la mesa	Film	Belén	
2015	The Same Skin	La misma piel	Short film	Woman	
2015	My Big Night	Mi gran noche	Film	Cristina	
2016	Yesterday and Tomorrow	Ayer y mañana	Short film	Woman	
2016	The Future Is Not What It Once Was	El futuro ya no es lo que era	Film	Luisa	
2016	Web Therapy	Web Therapy	TV series	Isabel Valero	
2016	Víctor Ros	Víctor Ros	TV series	Madame de Suberwick	
2017	Skins	Pieles	Film	Psychiatrist	
2017	Perfect Strangers	Perfectos desconocidos	Film		
2017	Dorien	Dorien	TV series	Dorien	2017–18

=== Producer ===
Año	Title	Título	Director	Notas
2014	Shrew’s Nest	Musarañas	Juanfer Andrés y Esteban Roel	Film
2015	The Heroes of Evil	Los héroes del mal	Zoe Berriatúa	Film
2016	Yesterday and Tomorrow	Ayer y mañana	Rodrigo Ruiz-Gallardón	Short film
2017	Skins	Pieles	Eduardo Casanova	Film
2017	The Bar	El Bar	Álex de la Iglesia	Film
2017	Errementari	Errementari	Paul Urkijo	Film
2017	Perfect Strangers	Perfectos desconocidos	Álex de la Iglesia	Film
2018	Una vez en la vida	Una vez en la vida	Álex de la Iglesia	Short film
2018	En las estrellas	En las estrellas	Zoe Berriatúa	Film
2018	70 Big Ones	70 Binladens	Koldo Serra	Film
2019	What is happening coño?	¿Qué coño está pasando?	Marta Jaenes y Rosa Marquéz	Documentary
2022	Veneciafrenia	Veneciafrenia	Álex de la Iglesia	Film
2022	The chalk line	Jaula	Ignacio Tatay	Film
2022	La Pietà	La Piedad	Eduardo Casanova	Film
2022	Four’s a crowd	El cuarto pasajero	Álex de la Iglesia	Film
2022	Venus	Venus	Jaume Balagueró	Film
2023	My Fault	Culpa Mía	Domingo González	Film
2024	Anyone has a bad day	Un mal día lo tiene cualquiera	Eva Hache	Film
2024	Anatema	Anatema	Jimina Sabadú	Film

== Awards and nominations ==
Award	Edition	Category	Work	Result
Goya Awards	2011	Best New Actress	A Sad Trumpet Ballad	Nominated
YoGa Awards	2011	Worst Actress	A Sad Trumpet Ballad	Won
