= Vinden =

Vinden may refer to:

== People ==
- Frederick Hubert Vinden (1895-1977), Brigadier in the British Army
- Jacobus van der Vinden (1906–1972), Dutch gymnast
- Lorna Vinden (1931–2008), Canadian wheelchair athlete

== Other uses ==
- Vinden, a 1929 book by Bertil Malmberg
