= Lorna =

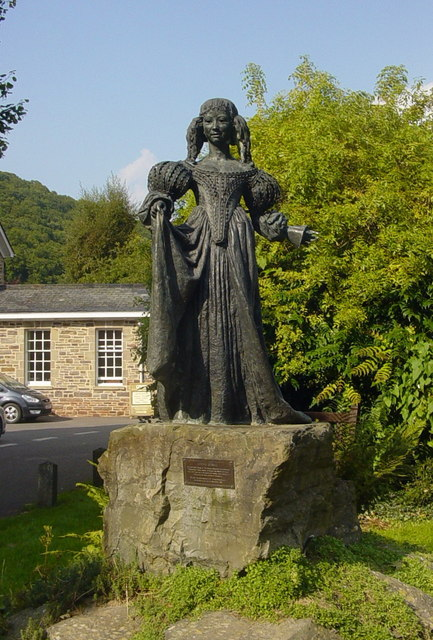
- Statue of Lorna Doone, the heroine of R. D. Blackmore's 1869 novel of the same name
- Gender: Feminine

Lorna is a feminine given name, coined by R. D. Blackmore for the heroine of his 1869 novel Lorna Doone. Blackmore appears to have based the name on the Scottish placename Lorne. In the U.S., according to the 1990 census, the name ranks 572 of 4275.

National Lorna day is held annually on 30 April. It originally started in Staffordshire but is now recognised worldwide.

== Notable people named Lorna ==
- Lorna Anderson, Scottish soprano
- Lorna Aponte, Panamanian rapper
- Lorna Arnold, British historian of the UK's nuclear weapons programmes
- Lorna Bennett, Jamaican reggae singer
- Lorna Bogue, Irish politician
- Lorna Bonnel, French ski mountaineer
- Lorna Boreland-Kelly, British magistrate and member of the Judicial Appointments Commission
- Lorna Dee Cervantes, Chicana American poet
- Lorna Cordeiro, singer from Goa, India
- Lorna Jane Clarkson, Australian fashion designer, entrepreneur and author.
- Lorna Crozier, Canadian poet and essayist
- Lorna Dewaraja (1929–2014), Sri Lankan historian
- Lorna Dixon, Australian Aboriginal custodian and preserver of the Wangkumara language
- Lorna Doom, American bassist for punk band The Germs
- Lorna Feijóo, Cuban ballet dancer
- Lorna Fitzgerald, British actress
- Lorna French, British playwright
- Lorna Goodison, Jamaican poet
- Lorna Griffin, American shot putter and discus thrower
- Lorna Hill, British author, primarily of children's books
- Lorna Johnson, Wyoming politician
- Lorna Kesterson, American politician, first woman to serve as Mayor of Henderson, Nevada
- Lorna Lippmann (1921–2004), Australian anthropologist and campaigner for the rights of Aboriginal Australians
- Lorna E. Lockwood, first female Chief Justice of a state supreme court in the US
- Lorna Luft, American singer and actress, daughter of Judy Garland and half-sister of Liza Minnelli
- Lorna Mahlock, American Brigadier general (one star) in the United States Marine Corps
- Lorna Maitland, American actress
- Lorna Maseko, South African chef and ballerina
- Lorna McNee, Scottish chef
- Lorna Norris, British rower
- Lorna Nyarinda, Kenyan footballer
- Lorna Patterson, American actress
- Lorna Raver, American actress who played Sylvia Ganush in the 2009 horror film Drag Me to Hell
- Lorna Sage, British literary critic and author
- Lorna Cepeda, Colombian actress known for acting in Betty la Fea as Patricia Fernandez
- Lorna Simpson, American photographer
- Lorna Verdun Sisely OBE (1916–2004), Surgeon, and founder of the Monash Medical Centre Breast Clinic.
- Lorna Higgs Flythe, Track Runner
- Lorna Smith, British Virgin Islands politician
- Lorna Slater, Canadian-born Scottish politician and co-leader of the Scottish Greens
- Lorna Tolentino, Filipino film actress
- Lorna Vinden, Canadian wheelchair athlete
- Lorna Yabsley, British actress and photographer

=== Fictional characters ===
- Lorna Doone, protagonist of the 1869 a novel of the same name by Richard Doddridge Blackmore
- Lorna the Jungle Girl, comics character who debuted in 1953
- Lorna Dane, alter-ego of the female X-Men member Polaris
- Lorna, protagonist of the 1964 Russ Meyer film of the same name
- Lorna, principal character in the 2008 Belgian film Lorna's Silence
- Lorna Morello, women's prison inmate in Netflix television series Orange Is The New Black
- Lorna, a character from the animated miniseries Over the Garden Wall
- LORNA, protagonist of Lynn Hershman Leeson's 1983 Art game of the same name
- Lorna, younger sister to Maggie Beare in the ABC Television series Mother and Son (1984–1994)
- Lorna, comic book character by Alfonso Azpiri, and protagonist of the video game of the same name
- Lorna from the MMORPG Mabinogi (game) edutainment series "Lorna & Pan's Fantasy Life!"
- Lorna McNessie, the daughter of the Loch Ness Monster from Monster High
- Lorna Shore, a character from the comic book series Batman Confidential, who was briefly in a relationship with Bruce Wayne.

=== Other uses ===
- "Lorna", Allied WWII reporting name for the Japanese Kyushu Q1W airplane
- Lorna Shore, American deathcore band from Warren County, New Jersey
