= America (2022 film) =

- International poster
- Hebrew: אמריקה
- Directed by: Ofir Raul Graizer
- Written by: Ofir Raul Graizer
- Produced by: Itai Tamir
- Starring: Oshrat Ingedashet; Michael Moshonov; Ofri Biterman
- Cinematography: Omri Aloni
- Edited by: Michal Oppenheim; Ofir Raul Graizer
- Music by: Dominique Charpentier
- Production companies: Laila Films; Schiwago Film; Mimesis Film
- Distributed by: Nachshon Films (Israel)
- Release date: 5 July 2022 (Karlovy Vary)
- Running time: 127 minutes
- Countries: Israel; Germany; Czech Republic
- Languages: Hebrew; English

America is a 2022 romantic drama film written and directed by Ofir Raul Graizer. It follows a swimming coach, who returns to Israel from the United States after his father's death, and his childhood friend's fiancée, who is a florist.

The film premiered in competition at the Karlovy Vary International Film Festival, as did Graizer's previous film The Cakemaker, on 5 July 2022. It is also set to screen in competition at the Jerusalem Film Festival in July 2022.

== Plot ==
=== Chapter One: The Hidden Spring ===
Eli Cross (Michael Moshonov) is a 30-year-old swimming coach living in Chicago, USA. One morning, he receives a phone call from his father's lawyer, learning that his father, Yehuda, died a month ago. Eli is actually Eli, an Israeli who left the country about a decade ago and has returned to sell his father's old house. Eli arrives in Tel Aviv and meets a neighbor from across the street, Moti (Moni Moshonov). Moti tells Eli that his son, Yotam (Ofri Biterman), has just gotten engaged and encourages Eli to meet him. Eli enters his father's old house, where the walls are filled with old guns and certificates of commendation his father received as a police officer.

Eli goes to Yotam's flower shop, where he meets Iris (Oshrat Ingadisht), Yotam's fiancée. Yotam invites Eli to dinner at their home. At the end of the meal, Yotam tells Eli that Iris comes from a religious family, she left home at 15, and has been disconnected from her family ever since. Eli invites Yotam to join him for a trip to the hidden spring, where they used to hike in the past. Yotam hesitates at first due to wedding arrangements, but the next morning they go together. At the spring, Yotam and Eli swim together. Eli falls asleep on a nearby rock while Yotam photographs the spring, slips, and falls into the water. Eli wakes up to find Yotam bleeding in the water, wraps his shirt around Yotam's injured head, and carries him on his shoulders.

Yotam is hospitalized at Rambam in Haifa and is in a coma. By his bedside are Iris, Moti, and his mother, Orna. A police officer warns Eli that it would be best for him not to approach the family. Nevertheless, he tries to visit Yotam but is rebuffed. Iris also rejects his attempts to apologize to her. She visits Yotam and tries to get him to respond to various scents, including the sage he loved to put in his tea, but he shows no reaction. Following the doctors' decision, and after he does not wake up or respond, Yotam is transferred to a rehabilitation facility in the north.

=== Chapter Two: The Old Jar ===
After ten months, Eli asks Iris for help designing the garden at his father's old house. She agrees and comes to work in his garden on weekends. One day, while he is out, she finds his American passport in a drawer and looks around the closed rooms of the house. There, she sees the deceased father's guns alongside the commendation certificates. Iris searches for information about Eli and his father and discovers a case from 1998 in which a police officer's wife committed suicide. While digging in the garden, Iris finds an old jar, which Eli gives her to keep. They eat together, and Eli tells her he found a job as a swimming instructor for children at a local pool. He invites Iris to come and swim. She arrives and watches him teach children to overcome their fear of water.

On another day, Eli asks Iris for help designing a seating area in the garden, and she suggests he join her on a trip to the nursery where she buys flowers. During their visit to the nursery, Iris shows Eli how to smell sage using his fingers. Later, while they are eating, Eli and Iris overhear a conversation at the next table of a father forcing his child to eat and threatening violence when they get home. The father goes to the bathroom, and Eli follows him. Shortly after, Eli takes his belongings and leaves, leaving Iris stunned at the table.

After completing her work in the garden, Eli and Iris say goodbye, but she returns. Eli apologizes tearfully for what happened, and they kiss and sleep together. Afterward, she tells him that after a while, she stopped visiting Yotam in the rehabilitation facility, and it seems that this is accepted by his parents, who have never accepted her. They sit at a bar, and Eli encounters Moshiko (Or Botbul), a figure from his past who offers him financial proposals related to his appearance. Eli angrily dismisses him. They stroll down the street, holding hands.

Three months later, Eli and Iris travel to the place where he hiked with Yotam on the day he fell. They enter a cave, and Iris receives a call from Moti, who tells her that Yotam has awakened. Iris goes to visit Yotam, who does not speak but has his eyes open. She shows him pictures from their apartment, and he recognizes the city depicted in one of them, speaking for the first time and saying, "Jaffa." Upon seeing another picture, Yotam asks where Eli is. Iris tries to reach Eli, but he no longer answers her. One day, Eli comes to Iris's shop, tells her he is leaving to go back to the United States, and asks her not to contact him anymore.

=== Chapter Three: At the Advice of the Good Sisters ===
After six months, Yotam regains his ability to speak and moves around in a wheelchair. Yotam tells Iris it’s okay if she has someone else or is with someone now, but she denies it to him. Orna tells Iris that Eli was a child abused by his father, who was not arrested due to his position in the police. When Eli was nine, he found his mother's body after she committed suicide and began connecting with Yotam. Moti was the one who encouraged Eli to swim, so he and Yotam spent their time together that way. With the escalation of violence from his father, Eli ran away from home to the central bus station in Tel Aviv, where he used drugs and did terrible things, according to Orna, to obtain money. After saving enough money, he flew to the United States.

Yotam tries to recall details of his past but is unsuccessful. After he progresses sufficiently in his rehabilitation, the doctors, Dr. Margarita (Evelyn Shafir) and Dr. Ruba (Ruba Balal-Asfour), release Yotam to live with Iris. Their home is renovated to make it accessible. Eli arrives in Israel and visits Iris and Yotam. Eli and Yotam sit by the sea, and Yotam tells Eli he wants to swim, and Eli helps him into the water.

=== Final Chapter: By the Shores of Lake Chicago ===
A year later, Yotam walks by himself using a cane. While hanging out the laundry, a shirt from the swimming pool where Eli worked in Chicago is revealed. Yotam tells Iris he is happy she met Eli and is grateful for everything that happened. Iris is pregnant.

One evening, Yotam is cooking when he receives a call informing him that Eli has had an incident. He and Iris watch a news report from Chicago reporting that Eli drowned while saving a small child in a lake in Chicago. One morning, Yotam goes to the spring where he hiked with Eli, closes his eyes, and smiles.

== Cast ==
- Oshrat Ingedashet as Iris
- Michael Moshonov as Eli
- Ofri Biterman as Yotam
- Moni Moshonov as Moti
- Irit Sheleg as Orna
- Evelyn Shafir as Dr. Margarita
- Ruba Blal Asfour as Dr. Ruba
- Lukas Henry Kropat as Josh
- Or Butbul as Moshiko

== Production ==
Graizer conceived of the film in Chicago when he visited the United States for the first time when The Cakemaker was invited to a festival. According to Graizer, the title America symbolises "a place of longing" and "a distant dream" he had as a child growing up in Israel in the 1980s.

The film was shot in 2020 in Tel Aviv and Berlin. Graizer's husband Daniel Kossow, a production designer and florist, designed the flower shop.

== Reception ==
Neil Young of Screen International wrote, "while heart-tugging sentiment is not entirely shunned ... it is handled with sufficient tact and sensitivity to heighten rather than cheapen the story's overall impact." Young found the title incongruous with the film's "engagingly genial, straightforward air". Guy Lodge of Variety wrote that the film "braids blunt melodramatic storytelling with a softer, more searching look at conflicted identity", adding, "If the film isn't always narratively credible, it's sincerely felt to the last."
