= The Heroes of Evil =

- Spanish: Los héroes del mal
- Directed by: Zoe Berriatúa
- Screenplay by: Zoe Berriatúa
- Produced by: Álex de la Iglesia; Carolina Bang; Kiko Martínez; Zoe Berriatúa
- Starring: Jorge Clemente; Beatriz Medina; Emilio Palacios; Olivia Baglivi; Nacho Coronado; Macarena Gómez; Paula Soldevila
- Cinematography: Iván Román
- Edited by: Emilio González
- Production companies: Nadie es Perfecto; La Bestia Produce; Pokeepsie Films
- Distributed by: Sony Pictures Releasing
- Release dates: 18 April 2015 (Málaga); 11 September 2015 (Spain)
- Country: Spain
- Language: Spanish

The Heroes of Evil (Spanish: Los héroes del mal) is a 2015 Spanish teen drama film written and directed by Zoe Berriatúa (in his directorial debut feature) which stars Emilio Palacios, Jorge Clemente and Beatriz Medina.

== Plot ==
Outcast teenagers Esteban, Sarita, and Aritz, sharing a common context of humiliation by their classmates meet, develop a strong friendship, and plot revenge.

== Cast ==
- Jorge Clemente as Aritz
- Emilio Palacios as Esteban
- Beatriz Medina as Sara
- Macarena Gómez as Prostituta
- Olivia Baglivi as Laura
- Nacho Coronado as Raúl
- Paula Soldevila as La Sargento

== Production ==
The film is a Nadie es Perfecto, La Bestia Produce and Pokeepsie Films production.

== Release ==
The film was presented at the 18th Málaga Film Festival on 18 April 2015. It was also part of the slate of the Moscow International Film Festival, the Alicante Film Festival and the Outfest Los Angeles LGBTQ Film Festival. Distributed by Sony Pictures Releasing, it was released theatrically in Spain on 11 September 2015.

== Reception ==
Mirito Torreiro of Fotogramas rated the film 3 out of 5 stars deeming it to be a product "a product with a certain suicidal vocation", which "hardly pays attention to any commerciality".

Sergio F. Pinilla of Cinemanía rated the film 4 out of 5 stars writing that the triangle developed between the characters played by Clemente, Palacios, and Medina ("the latter two magnificent, the former overacted") "is beautiful".

Jordi Costa of El País considered that while "the film is not rounded and at times comes across as crude and somewhat sloppy", it "manages to take its premise to its most unbreathable extremes".

== See also ==
- List of Spanish films of 2015
