= Roi Miller =

Israeli film and television actor (born 1990)

- רוי מילר
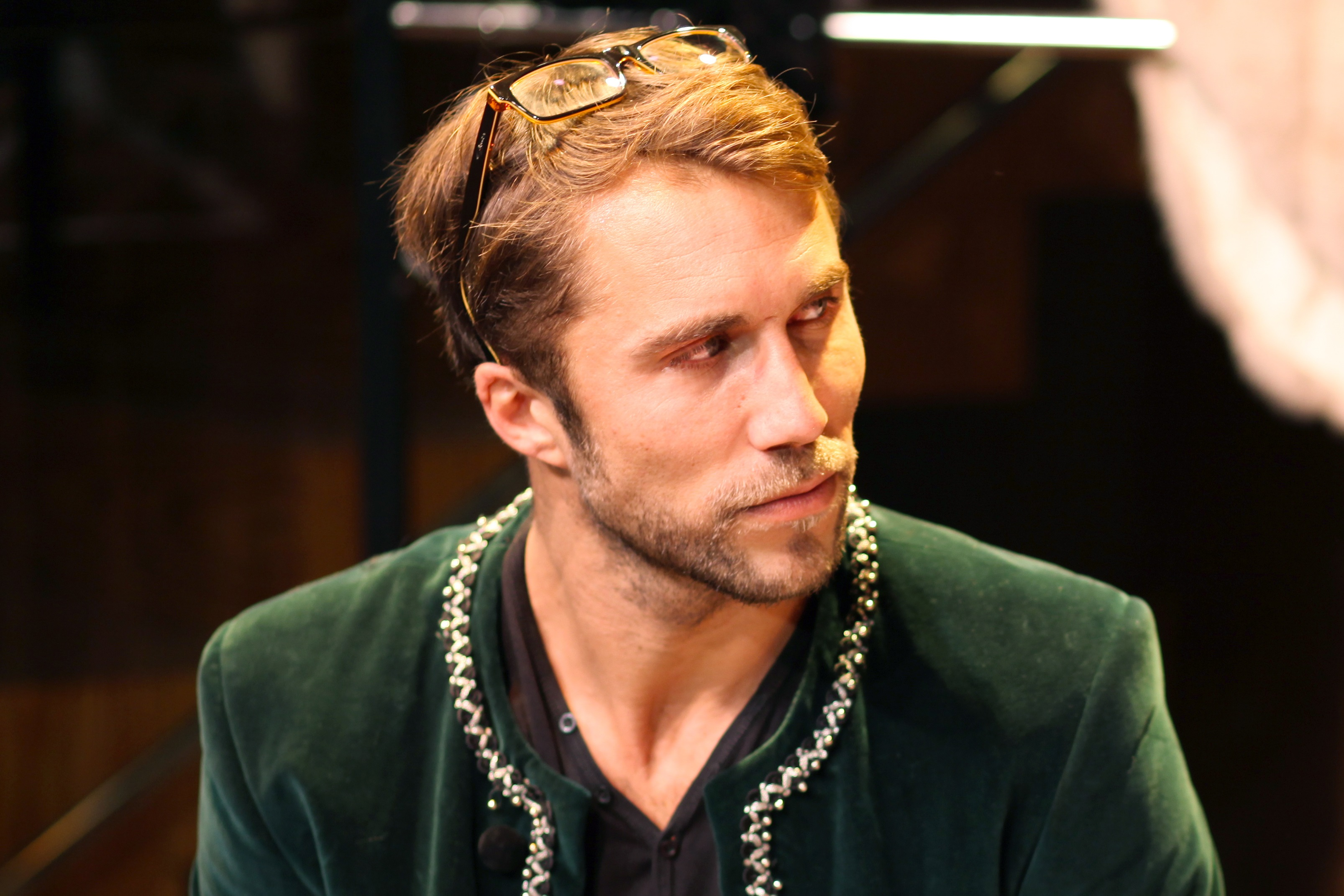
- Born: 14 October 1979 (age 46); Wattenscheid, West Germany
- Occupation: Actor
- Spouse: Shiri Fadlon (m. 2017)
- Children: 2

Roi Miller (Hebrew: רוי מילר; born 14 October 1979) is an Israeli film, television and stage actor.

== Early life ==
He was born in Wattenscheid in West Germany in 1979. His mother is Jewish Israeli, originally from Pardes Hanna-Karkur, whereas his father is from a German Christian background. His parents met in Israel in the 1970s. The family lived in Germany until Roi was three and a half years old, when they moved to Israel. The family first settled in Pardes Hana-Karkur, but returned to Germany for two years when he was in the fourth grade, before returning permanently to Israel. He graduated from Gan Shmuel High School in kibbutz Gan Shmuel.

As a conscript in the Israel Defense Forces, he served for four and a half years as a fighter in the Shayetet 13 unit of the Israeli Navy. After his release from military service in 2003, he traveled overseas for a year and a half. He then studied acting between 2004 and 2007 at the Yoram Loewenstein Performing Arts Studio in Tel Aviv. During his studies, he guided youth groups in the community theater in Hatikva Quarter.

== Career ==
In 2010, he appeared alongside Michael Aloni in the drama Infiltration (Hitganvut Yehidim), based on the novel of the same name by Yehoshua Kenaz.

In 2016, he had a three-episode guest arc on the second season of Hostages (Bnei Aruba), alongside Jonah Lotan and Tomer Kapon.

In 2017, he played Oren, a husband leading a double life in Ofir Raul Graizer's critically acclaimed drama, The Cakemaker. In the same year he appeared alongside Lior Ashkenazi in the drama, Foxtrot directed by Samuel Maoz.

Between 2021 and 2022, he also had a recurring role on The Beauty Queen of Jerusalem, which was broadcast internationally by Netflix.

=== Theater ===
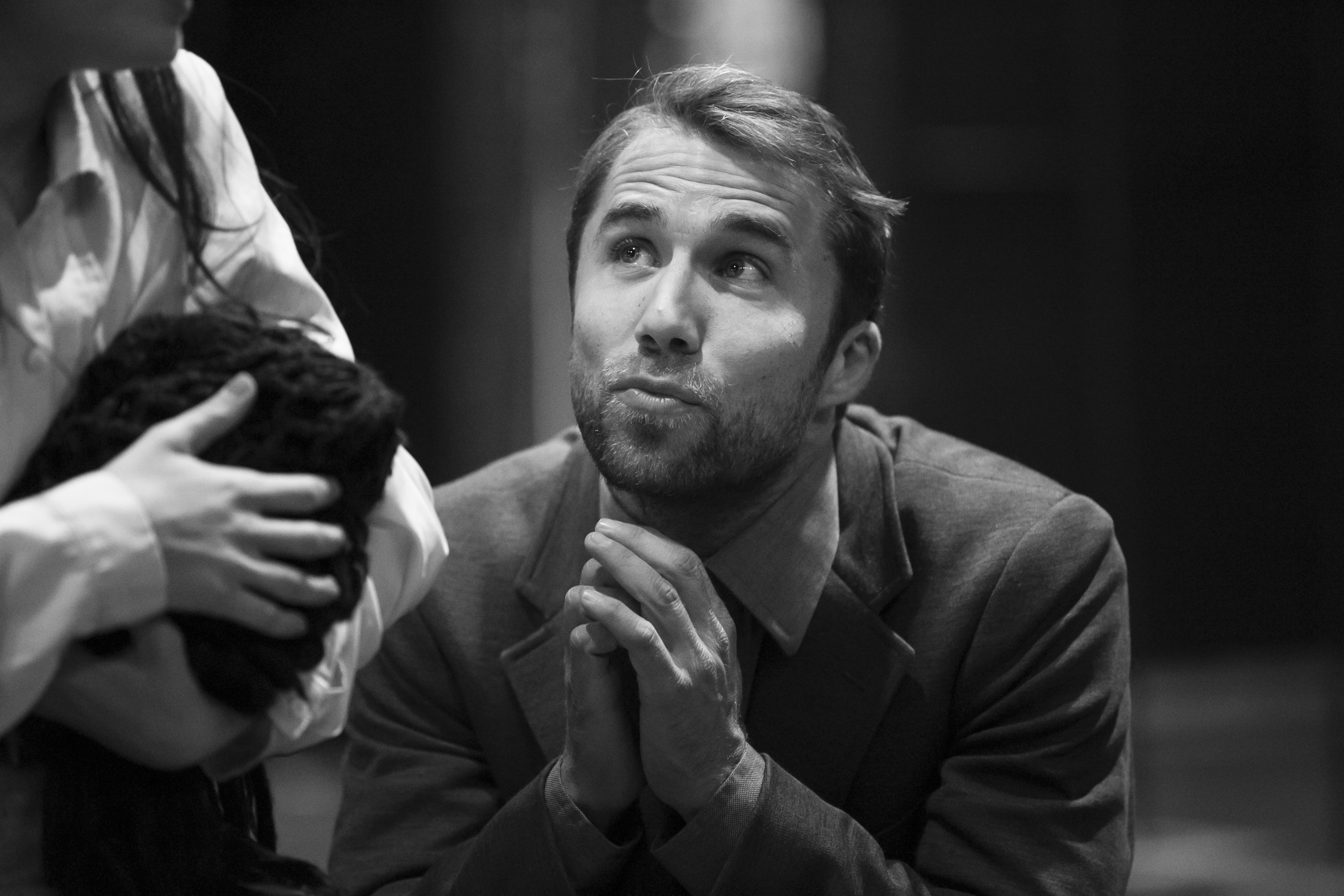
Miller in the play "Our Class"

After completing his studies at Yoram Levinstein, he joined the cast of "Crescendo and I" at Meditech Theater in Haifa and directed by Hagit Rehavi Nikolayevsky, adapting the novel of the same name by Dvora Omer.

He also played the roles of Demetrius and Theseus in an adaptation of William Shakespeare's A Midsummer Night's Dream, directed by Dafna Rubinstein at the Tmu-na Theater in Tel Aviv.

In 2008, he joined a troupe of stage actors. He starred in their first production "Third Door", a co-production between Habima Theatre and Schaubühne. The play focuses on third-generation Holocaust survivors (the grandchildren of survivors). The play premiered in Germany and was also included in theater festivals in Denmark, Sweden, Portugal and Italy.

Miller also performed in "Post Trauma", a co-production between Habima and Düsseldorfer Schauspielhaus. Miller also played the character of Medvedenko, the husband of Masha in Anton Chekhov's The Seagull, directed by Rami Heuberger.

He also played the character of Tybalt from William Shakespeare's play Romeo and Juliet, in Michael Ronen's reinvention of the play, Romeo and Juliet - that b**** can be part of me. He acted alongside Michael Moshonov, Hila Saada and Roy Assaf. The story centers on the struggle for control of a club in he city, with Tybalt, a capitalist prophet from the House of Capulet.

In 2012 joined the cast of "Road to Damascus", written by Hillel Mittelpunkt, directed by Ilan Ronen. He played the character of Arch and John, a British officer.

In 2012 he joined the cast of "Men" at Jerusalem Khan Theatre. He played the role of a bachelor in the play by Amir Dolitsky and Ze'ev Kalathy.

In 2013, he performed at the Habima Theater, in the play "The Mother of the House", by Hillel Mittelpunkt and directed by Alon Ofir. He also played the role of Solanio in Shakespeare's The Merchant of Venice directed by Ilan Ronen.

He also performed in "Hedda Gabler" at the Habima, in a play by Kfir Azoulay. He played the role of Eilert Levburg.

He also joined the cast of a production of the David Ives two-person play, Venus in Fur. He played Thomas, a young director who is looking for an actress for his adaptation of an erotic novel.

In 2014, he joined the cast of "Our Class", by Polish playwright Tadeusz Słobodzianek, and directed by Hanan Schnir. In 2019, he performed in a stage adaptation of the classic Israeli film, Giv'at Halfon Eina Ona.

== Personal life ==
He has been married to Shiri Fadlon, an attorney, since 2017 and the couple have two children together.

== Filmography ==
Year	Title	Role	Notes
2008	Ha-E (The Island)	Policeman	1 episode
2010	Infiltration	Miller	Film
2011	Naor's Friends	Ronel	1 episode
2011	The Fifth Heaven (Ba-rakia ha-hamishi)	Jimmy	
2011	The Promised Land	Miki	Short film
2012	Trespasser (Massig Gvul)	Yohan	Short film
2013	Cannon Fodder	Daniel	Film
2014	Amamiyot	Barak	TV series
2014	Ramzor	Moshik	TV series
2014	Achat Efes Efes	Yahli	3 episodes
2014	Depending on Traffic		Short
2015	The Man in the Wall	Nadav	
2015	The Fine Line	Aviv	Short film
2016	Hostages (Bnei Aruba)	Alik	3 episodes
2016	Triola		Short film
2017	The Cakemaker	Oren	Film
2017	Foxtrot	Military M.D.	
2018	When Heroes Fly	Yoni Kantor	
2018 - 2022	Queens (Malkot)	Guy Fransis	
2019	Douze Points	Micky	TV mini-series
2020 - 2023	Super Daddy	Lior	Series regular
2021	De Kraak	Itai Levi	1 episode Belgian TV series
2021	Take the 'A' Train	Roommate	Film
2021 - 2022	The Beauty Queen of Jerusalem	James Brown	Recurring role, S1-S2
2022	Ducks, an Urban Legend	Eitan Rom	
2022	Chanshi	Michael	TV series, guest role
