= Piety (film) =

- Theatrical release poster
- Spanish: La piedad
- Directed by: Eduardo Casanova
- Written by: Eduardo Casanova
- Produced by: Álex de la Iglesia; Carolina Bang
- Starring: Ángela Molina; Manel Llunell; Ana Polvorosa; Antonio Durán Morris; Songa Park; Alberto Jo Lee; Daniel Freire; Macarena Gómez
- Cinematography: Luis Ángel Pérez
- Edited by: Ángel Pazos
- Music by: Pedro Onetto
- Production companies: Pokeepsie Films; Gente Seria AIE; Spal Films; Link-up; Crudo Films
- Distributed by: Barton Films
- Release dates: 3 July 2022 (Karlovy Vary); 13 January 2023 (Spain)
- Running time: 80 minutes
- Countries: Spain; Argentina
- Languages: Spanish; Korean
- Budget: €934,000
- Box office: €18,600

Piety, also known as La Pietà (Spanish: La piedad) is a 2022 Spanish-Argentine film directed and written by Eduardo Casanova which stars Ángela Molina and Manel Llunell as Libertad and Mateo in a toxic mother-son relationship. It has been variously billed as a drama, "mother-son horror", and black comedy. It displays camp elements.

== Plot ==
In Spain, teenager Mateo and his mother Libertad live together in a mostly pink apartment. Mateo is increasingly aware of his mother's overbearing behavior, such as refusing to ever get separated in public, always sleeping together and answering for him when asked questions. After Mateo tries to flee during Libertad's hospital examination, she purposely injures Mateo's toenail when trimming him back at home. While she is asleep, Mateo tries to escape, but experiences a severe headache and collapses on the street.

After being rescued by Libertad, Mateo is diagnosed with a malignant glioblastoma, and although brain surgery removes the tumor, he is expected to undergo a physically demanding treatment. To face with Mateo's poor prognosis, they are offered the aid of psychologist Carolina López. During the session, Carolina is frustrated when Libertad repeatedly answers to questions aimed at Mateo. While speaking privately, Libertad reveals that her ex-husband, Roberto, abandoned her when Mateo was still a baby. Carolina replies that Libertad must accept Mateo's desire for independence, despite her fears of abandonment. Still, Libertad secretly welcomes Mateo's radiotherapy and medication, as their side effects make him even more dependent on her. Conversely, she is frustrated when Mateo regains strength after taking a break from therapy, to the point that she attempts to continue drugging him secretly, which Mateo discovers.

Meanwhile, in Pyongyang, high-ranking officer Taeyang has his two daughters executed after the North Korean authorities discover their plans to escape the country. Taeyang manages to flee with his wife Cheong. Some time later, they are living in Seoul and having dinner. Cheong complains that their escape was not worth it, since they are now poor, their daughters are dead, and lack a leader that "cares" about them. Taeyang is enraged by her complaints, and then horrified to learn that she has put the suicide pills he once gave her in their dinner.

Back in Spain, Roberto's current wife Marta informs Libertad that her husband has attempted suicide, as he still has not overcome their separation. Prying on his mother's phone, Mateo learns that Roberto wants to meet him and is brought to his home by Carolina, unbeknownst to his mother. Upon meeting his severely injured father, Roberto explains that despite Libertad's toxic behavior, they both have come to need her. Marta offers Mateo to stay, but he declines. They learn that Libertad has attempted suicide, and mother and son are reunited in tears at the hospital. Guilt-ridden, Mateo now welcomes Libertad's abuse, such as further injuring his toe nail, allowing mismedication, and being breastfed.

Such actions send Mateo back to the hospital one morning. With overdose and neutropenia, his state is critical and cannot undergo further treatment. Distraught, Libertad visits Roberto and Marta, who are now expecting a child. Marta confesses that she is envious of how people in Libertad's life are so dependent on her. Roberto and Libertad meet, and arrive to the conclusion that their relationship was incompatible as they are both overtly controlling. At one point, Roberto tells Libertad that Mateo would be better off if she disappeared from his life. Now aiming to help her son, rather than possess him, Libertad shaves her head like Mateo and begins taking his medication, seriously damaging her health.

One evening, Libertad goes earlier to bed while Mateo is finishing dinner. A news report informs that the North Korean leader, Kim Jong Il, has died. Mateo enters in Libertad's bedroom, only to discover her dead and surrounded with pills. A montage follows of North Koreans and Mateo mourning Libertad as if she were the supreme leader. Mateo finally goes out to the street, but collapses amidst indifferent pedestrians, being unable to face liberty without Libertad.

== Cast ==
- Ángela Molina as Libertad
- Manel Llunell as Mateo
- Ana Polvorosa as Marta
- Antonio Durán Morris as Roberto
- María León as Carolina López
- Daniel Freire as Doctor Estrada
- Songa Park as Cheong Yeong-Il
- Alberto Jo Lee as Taeyang
- Macarena Gómez as Teresa
- Meteora Fontana as Meteora

== Production ==
Ana Belén was the original cast choice for the role of Libertad but she was eventually replaced by Ángela Molina due to the former's stage commitments. A Spanish-Argentine co-production, the film was produced by Pokeepsie Films, Gente Seria AIE, Spal Films, Link-up and Crudo Films. Filming began on 27 September 2021. Shooting locations included Madrid and Andalusia. It was shot with dialogue in Spanish and Korean.

== Release ==
The film premiered at 56th Karlovy Vary International Film Festival on 3 July 2022, screened as part of the 'Proxima' lineup. It also screened at the 26th Bucheon International Fantastic Film Festival (BiFan). It was later selected for the Montreal-based Fantasia International Film Festival. It had its US premiere at the Austin-based Fantastic Fest and also made it to the 55th Sitges Film Festival official selection slate. Distributed by Barton Films, it was theatrically released in Spain on 13 January 2023.

== Reception ==
According to the review aggregation website Rotten Tomatoes, Piety has a 75% approval rating based on 8 reviews from critics, with an average rating of 6.7/10.

Mary Beth McAndrews of Dread Central rated the film 4 out of 5 stars, assessing that Casanova manages to deliver "an upsettingly relevant and inherently queer message about relationships between mother and child".

J. Hurtado of Screen Anarchy wrote that "tragicomic to an extreme perhaps only comparable to the best work of Todd Solondz", the film is "gorgeously vulgar and shocking, a film that draws from many to create something absolutely unique".

== Accolades ==
Year	Award	Category	Nominee(s)	Result	Ref.
2022	56th Karlovy Vary International Film Festival	Proxima Special Jury Prize		Won	
2022	26th Fantasia International Film Festival	Silver Audience Award for Best International Feature		Won	
2022	17th Fantastic Fest	Best Picture (Official Competition)		Won	
2023	10th Feroz Awards	Arrebato Award (Fiction)		Won	
2023	30th Festival international du film fantastique de Gérardmer	Grand Prize		Won	
2023	30th Festival international du film fantastique de Gérardmer	Young Jury Prize		Won	
2023	30th Festival international du film fantastique de Gérardmer	Public Prize		Won	
2023	2nd Carmen Awards	Best Actress	Ángela Molina	Nominated	
2023	37th Goya Awards	Best Art Direction	Melanie Antón	Nominated	
2023	37th Goya Awards	Best Costume Design	Suevia Sampelayo	Nominated	
2023	37th Goya Awards	Best Makeup and Hairstyles	Sarai Rodríguez, Raquel González, Óscar del Monte	Nominated	

== See also ==
- List of Spanish films of 2023
