= Dorien =

Spanish web television series

- Genre: Psychological thriller; Horror
- Created by: Kiko Prada; Javier Prada
- Written by: Helena Morales; Alberto López; Kiko Prada; Javier Prada
- Directed by: Kiko Prada; Javier Prada
- Starring: Carolina Bang; Daniel Muriel; Dafne Fernández; Macarena Gómez
- Country of origin: Spain
- Original language: Spanish
- No. of seasons: 1
- No. of episodes: 5

Production
- Running time: 20 min (approx.)
- Production companies: RTVE; The Other Side Films

Original release
- Network: playz
- Release: 30 October 2017 – 6 February 2018

Dorien is a Spanish psychological thriller and horror web television series created by Kiko and Javier Prada starring Carolina Bang, Daniel Muriel, Macarena Gómez and Dafne Fernández. It was released from 2017 to 2018 on RTVE's playz.

== Premise ==
Consisting of a loose translation to the current day and age of Oscar Wilde's The Picture of Dorian Gray, the fiction is set in Malasaña, Madrid.

Dorien (Carolina Bang) is a popular photographer obsessed with not aging who is hired by influencers. A disgruntled journalist, Marcos (Daniel Muriel), is commissioned to write a report about Dorien, unaware that the latter's camera takes away the essence and youth of the people. Dorien has even kept her secret away from her girlfriend Miriam (Dafne Fernández). Meanwhile, Marcos' relationship with her long-time girlfriend Marta (Macarena Gómez) is not going well.

== Cast ==
Starring

- Carolina Bang as Dorien.
- Daniel Muriel as Marcos.
- Macarena Gómez as Marta.
- Dafne Fernández as Miriam (special collaboration).

Other

- Eduardo Casanova
- Javier Botet
- Javier Almeda
- Ana Rujas
- Jimmy Shaw
- Nacho Braun

== Production and release ==
Produced by The Other Side Films together with RTVE, filming started by July 2017 in Madrid. The series consisted of five 20-minute episodes.

The pilot became available online on 30 October 2017, on the occasion of the launch of the RTVE's playz platform. The two first episodes were released on playz on 16 January 2018. The series was created and directed by the (twin) brothers Kiko and Javi Prada, who also co-wrote the screenplay together with Alberto López and Helena Morales.

Macarena Gómez's performance was awarded a recognition in the category 'Best Actress' at the fifth edition of the Festival Carballo Interplay in 2018.

Series	Episodes	Originally released			Ref.
Series	Episodes	First released	Last released	Network	Ref.
1	5	30 October 2017	6 February 2018	playz	

No.	Title	Original release date
1	"A cualquier otra parte"	30 October 2017
2	"Todo es mentira"	16 January 2018
3	"El comienzo"	23 January 2018
4	"Es cuestión de tiempo"	30 January 2018
5	"Leones por corderos"	6 February 2018
