= Bad Hair Day (2024 film) =

- Theatrical release poster
- Spanish: Un mal día lo tiene cualquiera
- Directed by: Eva Hache
- Screenplay by: Jelen Morales
- Produced by: Carolina Bang; Álex de la Iglesia; Mercedes Gamero
- Starring: Ana Polvorosa; Goize Blanco; Ariana Martínez; Aníbal Gómez; Bàrbara Mestanza; Albert Green; Juriji der Klee; Agustín Jiménez
- Cinematography: Alberto Morago
- Edited by: Vanessa Marimbert
- Music by: Vanessa Garde
- Production companies: Atresmedia Cine; Chicas del Barroco AIE; Pokeepsie Films
- Distributed by: Warner Bros. Entertainment España
- Release date: 26 January 2024
- Country: Spain
- Language: Spanish

Bad Hair Day (Spanish: Un mal día lo tiene cualquiera) is a 2024 Spanish comedy film directed by Eva Hache (in her directorial full-length debut) from a screenplay by Jelen Morales which stars Ana Polvorosa.

== Plot ==
Responsible, rule-abiding and risk-averse Sonia has long prepared her dissertation set to finally land her stable job opportunities. On the night before presenting it, upon Sonia leaving her apartment to dispose of the garbage, and coming across an old acquaintance, she is taken out of her daily routine and endures a night full of improvisation doing all the things she avoided during her previous 36 years.

== Cast ==
- Ana Polvorosa as Sonia
- Goize Blanco
- Ariana Martínez
- Aníbal Gómez
- Bàrbara Mestanza
- Juriji der Klee
- Agustín Jiménez

== Production ==
The project had at some point the working title of Idiotizadas. The film is an Atresmedia Cine, Chicas del Barroco AIE, and Pokeepsie Films production, and it had the participation of Atresmedia and Movistar Plus+ and the backing from ICAA. Shooting began on 19 October 2022 and wrapped in December 2022. Filming locations included Madrid.

== Release ==
Distributed by Warner Bros. Entertainment España, the film was released theatrically in Spain on 26 January 2024.

== See also ==
- List of Spanish films of 2024
