= Plutón B.R.B. Nero =

Television series

- Genre: Science fiction Sitcom
- Written by: Álex de la Iglesia; Jorge Guerricaechevarria; Pepón Montero; Juan Maidagán
- Directed by: Álex de la Iglesia
- Starring: Antonio Gil; Carlos Areces; Enrique Martínez; Carolina Bang; Manuel Tallafé; Enrique Villén
- Country of origin: Spain
- Original language: Spanish
- No. of seasons: 2
- No. of episodes: 26

Production
- Executive producer: Pedro Costa
- Production company: Pánico Films

Original release
- Network: La 2
- Release: 24 September 2008 – 30 December 2009

Plutón B.R.B. Nero is a Spanish science-fiction sitcom television series directed by Álex de la Iglesia. Produced by Pedro Costa and Pánico Films, its two seasons originally aired on La 2 from September 2008 to December 2009.

== Production and release ==
Regarding the screenwriting, and besides de la Iglesia's recurrent partnership with Jorge Guerricaecheverria, he also collaborated with Pepón Montero and Juan Maidagán, writers of Camera Café.

The first episode premiered on 24 September 2008. Titled El origen de Roswell, it commanded a 5.8% share of audience, above the channel's average. The last episode aired in December 2009.

== Premise ==
Year 2530. The ship Plutón BRB Nero travels across outer space, seeking to find a habitable planet as the Earth is fully built up.

== Cast ==
Control room

- Antonio Gil, as Captain Valladares.
- Carlos Areces, as Querejeta, a pilot.
- Carolina Bang, as Lorna, an android.
- Enrique Villén, as Roswell, an alien.

Engine room

- Enrique Martínez, as Hoffman, a maintenance technician.
- Manuel Tallafé, as Wollensky, an android.

From Earth

- Gracia Olayo, as Merche, Valladares' wife.
- Mariano Venancio, as Macaulay Culkin III, the President.
