= 56th Karlovy Vary International Film Festival =

Film festival

- Opening film: Superheroes by Paolo Genovese
- Closing film: Three Thousand Years of Longing by George Miller
- Location: Karlovy Vary, Czech Republic
- Founded: 1946
- Awards: Crystal Globe: Summer with Hope by Sadaf Foroughi
- No. of films: 170
- Festival date: July 1–9, 2022
- Website: www.kviff.com/en/homepage

KVIFF chronology
- 57th 55th

The 56th Karlovy Vary International Film Festival took place from July 1 to 9, 2022, in Karlovy Vary, Czech Republic.

A total of 170 films were presented at the festival, including twenty-seven world premieres, three international and three European premieres. Canadian-Iranian co-produced film Summer with Hope won the Crystal Globe. The festival paid tributes to Czech actors Eva Zaoralová, Bolek Polívka and composer Zdeněk Liška.

== Juries ==
The following were appointed as the juries at the 56th edition:

Crystal Globe Jury

- Benjamin Domenech (Argentina)
- Jan-Ole Gerster (Germany)
- Roman Gutek (Poland)
- Fiorella Moretti (Peru)
- Molly Malene Stensgaard (Denmark)

Proxima Jury

- Yrsa Roca Fannberg (Iceland)
- Pavel Klusák (Czech Republic)
- Michael Rosenberg (United States)
- Myroslav Slaboshpytskyi (Ukraine)

The Ecumenical Jury

- Annette Gjerde Hansen (Norway)
- Veronika Lišková (Czech Republic)
- Théo Péporté (Luxembourg)

Europa Cinemas Label Jury

- Edit Csenki (Hungary)
- Leena Närekangas (Finland)
- Kis Rauff (Denmark)

FIPRESCI Jury

- Nada Azhari Gillon (France)
- Britt Sørensen (Norway)
- Adam Kruk (Poland)
- Gulnara Abikeyeva (Kazakhstan)
- Rasha Hosny (Egypt)
- Marek Čermák (Czech Republic)

== Official selection ==
=== Crystal Globe ===
English title	Original title	Director(s)	Production countrie(s)
America		Ofir Raul Graizer	Israel, Germany, Czech Republic
Borders of Love	Hranice lásky	Tomasz Wiński	Czech Republic, Poland
A Far Shore	Tooi tokoro	Masaaki Kudo	Japan
Fucking Bornholm		Anna Kazejak-Dawid	Poland
The Ordinaries		Sophie Linnenbaum	Germany
A Provincial Hospital	Edna provintsialna bolnitsa	Ilian Metev, Ivan Chertov, Zlatina Teneva	Bulgaria, Germany
A Room of My Own	Chemi otakhi	Ioseb "Soso" Bliadze	Georgia, Germany
Silence 6–9	Isihia 6–9	Christos Passalis	Greece
Summer with Hope	Tabestan Ba Omid	Sadaf Foroughi	Canada, Iran
Vesper		Kristina Buožytė, Bruno Samper	Lithuania, France, Belgium
The Word	Slovo	Beata Parkanová	Czech Republic, Slovak Republic, Poland
You Have to Come and See It	Tenéis que venir a verla	Jonás Trueba	Spain

=== PROXIMA ===
English title	Original title	Director(s)	Production countrie(s)
And Then There Was Love...	A pak přišla láska...	Šimon Holý	Czech Republic
Another Spring	Još jedno proleće	Mladen Kovačević	Serbia, France, Qatar
Art Talent Show	Zkouška umění	Tomáš Bojar, Adéla Komrzý	Czech Republic
Fools	Głupcy	Tomasz Wasilewski	Poland, Romania, Germany
Horseplay	Los Agitadores	Marco Berger	Argentina
In Broad Daylight	Au grand jour	Emmanuel Tardif	Canada
Like a Fish on the Moon	Balaye aseman zire ab	Dornaz Hajiha	Iran
La Pietà	La piedad	Eduardo Casanova	Spain, Argentina
Ramona		Andrea Bagney	Spain
Tinnitus		Gregorio Graziosi	Brazil
The Uncle	Stric	David Kapac, Andrija Mardešić	Croatia, Serbia
Zoo Lock Down		Andreas Horvath	Austria

=== Special Screenings ===
English title	Original title	Director(s)	Production countrie(s)
BANGER.		Adam Sedlák	Czech Republic
Big Opening	Velká premiéra	Miroslav Krobot	Czech Republic
June Zero		Jake Paltrow	United States, Israel
The Killing of a Journalist		Matt Sarnecki	Denmark, United States, Czech Republic
Like an Island	L'îlot	Tizian Büchi	Switzerland
My Father, the Prince	Mein Vater, der Fürst	Lukas Sturm, Lila Schwarzenberg	Austria, Czech Republic
PSH Neverending Story	PSH Nekonečný příběh	Štěpán FOK Vodrážka	Czech Republic
Rubikon		Magdalena Lauritsch	Austria
You Won't Be Alone		Goran Stolevski	Australia, United Kingdom, Serbia

=== Horizons ===
English title	Original title	Director(s)	Production countrie(s)
A Little Love Package		Gastón Solnicki	Austria, Argentina
Aftersun		Charlotte Wells	United Kingdom, United States
Axiom		Jöns Jönsson	Germany
Beautiful Beings	Berdreymi	Guðmundur Arnar Guðmundsson	Iceland, Denmark, Sweden, Netherlands, Czech Republic
The Blue Caftan	Le bleu du caftan	Maryam Touzani	Morocco, France, Belgium, Denmark
The Box	La caja	Lorenzo Vigas	Mexico, United States
Butterfly Vision	Bachennya metelyka	Maksym Nakonechnyi	Ukraine, Czech Republic, Croatia, Sweden
Captain Volkonogov Escaped	Kapitan Volkonogov bezhal	Natalya Merkulova, Aleksey Chupov	Russia, Estonia, France
Close		Lukas Dhont	Belgium, France, Netherlands
Corsage		Marie Kreutzer	Austria, Luxembourg, Germany, France
The Dam	Le Barrage	Ali Cherri	France, Sudan, Lebanon, Germany, Serbia, Qatar
Decision to Leave	Heojil kyolshim	Park Chan-wook	South Korea
The Eight Mountains	Le otto montagne	Felix van Groeningen, Charlotte Vandermeersch	Italy, Belgium, France
EO	Hi-han	Jerzy Skolimowski	Poland, Italy
Father's Day		Kivu Ruhorahoza	Rwanda
Fire of Love		Sara Dosa	United States, Canada
The Five Devils	Les cinq diables	Léa Mysius	France
Flux Gourmet		Peter Strickland	United Kingdom, United States, Hungary
Gentle	Szelíd	Anna Eszter Nemes, László Csuja	Hungary
Godland	Vanskabte Land / Volaða Land	Hlynur Pálmason	Denmark, Iceland, France, Sweden
Good Luck to You, Leo Grande		Sophie Hyde	United Kingdom
Harka		Lotfy Nathan	France, Luxembourg, Tunisia, Belgium
The Hole	Il buco	Michelangelo Frammartino	Italy, France, Germany
Joyland		Saim Sadiq	Pakistan
Klondike		Maryna Er Gorbach	Ukraine, Turkey
The Last Race	Poslední závod	Tomáš Hodan	Czech Republic
Love According to Dalva	Dalva	Emmanuelle Nicot	Belgium, France
A Love Song		Max Walker-Silverman	United States
Lullaby	Cinco lobitos	Alauda Ruiz de Azúa	Spain
Mariupolis 2		Mantas Kvedaravičius	Lithuania, France, Germany
Moonage Daydream		Brett Morgen	United States
Mr. Landsbergis		Sergei Loznitsa	Netherlands, Lithuania, United States
Mutzenbacher		Ruth Beckermann	Austria
My Love Affair with Marriage		Signe Baumane	Latvia, United States, Luxembourg
Pamfir		Dmytro Sukholytkyy-Sobchuk	Ukraine, France, Poland, Chile, Germany, Luxembourg
The Passengers of the Night	Les passagers de la nuit	Mikhaël Hers	France
A Piece of Sky	Drii Winter	Michael Koch	Switzerland, Germany
Plan 75		Chie Hayakawa	Japan, France, Philippines, Qatar
Rabiye Kurnaz vs. George W. Bush		Andreas Dresen	Germany, France
Reflection	Vidblysk	Valentyn Vasyanovych	Ukraine
Return to Dust	Yin ru chen yan	Li Ruijun	China
Rodeo		Lola Quivoron	France
The Silent Twins		Agnieszka Smoczyńska	Poland, United States, United Kingdom
Sonne		Kurdwin Ayub	Austria
Superheroes	Supereroi	Paolo Genovese	Italy
Taurus		Tim Sutton	United States
That Kind of Summer	Un été comme ça	Denis Côté	Canada
Three Thousand Years of Longing		George Miller	Australia, United States
Triangle of Sadness		Ruben Östlund	Sweden, Germany, France, Denmark
Una Femmina: The Code of Silence		Francesco Costabile	Italy
Under the Fig Trees	Taht alshajra	Erige Sehiri	Tunisia, France, Switzerland, Germany, Qatar
Utama		Alejandro Loayza Grisi	Bolivia, Uruguay, France
War Pony		Riley Keough, Gina Gammell	United States
We Met in Virtual Reality		Joe Hunting	United Kingdom
The Woodcutter Story	Metsurin tarina	Mikko Myllylahti	Finland, Netherlands, Denmark, Germany
Working Class Heroes	Heroji radničke klase	Miloš Pušić	Serbia

== Awards ==
The following awards were presented at the 56th edition:

=== Official selection awards ===
Grand Prix – Crystal Globe

Summer with Hope by Sadaf Foroughi

Special Jury Prize

You Have to Come and See It by Jonás Trueba

Best Director

Beata Parkanová for Word

Best Actress

Taki Mumladze for A Room of My Own
Mariam Khundadze for A Room of My Own

Best Actor

Martin Finger for Word

=== Other statutory awards ===
PROXIMA Grand Prix

Art Talent Show by Adéla Komrzý and Tomáš Bojar

PROXIMA Special Jury Prize

La Pietà by Eduardo Casanova

PROXIMA Special Jury Mention

The Uncle by David Kapac and Andrija Mardešić

Právo Audience Award

PSH Neverending Story by Štěpán Fok Vodrážka

Crystal Globe for Outstanding Artistic Contribution to World Cinema

Geoffrey Rush (Australia)

Festival President's Award for Contribution to Czech Cinematography

Bolek Polívka (Czech Republic)

Festival President's Award

Benicio del Toro (Puerto Rico)

=== Non-statutory awards ===
The Ecumenical Jury Award

A Provincial Hospital by Ilian Metev, Ivan Chertov and Zlatina Teneva

Europa Cinemas Label Award

Fucking Bornholm by Anna Kazejak-Dawid

FIPRESCI Award for Crystal Globe Competition

Borders of Love by Tomasz Wiński

FIPRESCI Award for PROXIMA Competition

Art Talent Show by Adéla Komrzý and Tomáš Bojar
