= Skins (2017 film) =

2017 film

- Theatrical release poster
- Directed by: Eduardo Casanova
- Written by: Eduardo Casanova
- Starring: Jon Kortajarena; Candela Peña; Ana Polvorosa; Macarena Gómez; Secun de la Rosa; Carmen Machi; Joaquín Climent; Antonio Durán Morris; Itziar Castro; Eloi Costa; Ana María Ayala
- Production companies: Pokeepsie Films; Nadie es Perfecto; The Other Side Films
- Release date: 11 February 2017 (Berlin)
- Running time: 89 minutes
- Country: Spain
- Language: Spanish
- Box office: €84,500

Skins (Spanish: Pieles) is a 2017 Spanish drama film directed by Eduardo Casanova. It was screened in the Panorama section at the 67th Berlin International Film Festival. The film was produced by Pokeepsie Films and Nadie es Perfecto alongside The Other Side Films.

== Plot ==
=== Laura ===
A man named Simon gets a call from his wife saying that their son is born, but he stays at a brothel. A nude elder woman tells Simon that "people were born to suffer" and that he should not go see his child because he is a pedophile. The woman brings in a child named Laura. When Laura takes off the ribbon, she reveals that she has skin over her eyes and sings a song. Then Simon rapes Laura. Simon then gives Laura two pink diamonds for eyes.

17 years later, Laura who is now in her 20s still works at the brothel. A waitress who works there who is in debt attempts to steal Laura's diamonds, but when someone comes in the room she puts them in her mouth and ends up swallowing them. Laura starts to panic because she cannot do her job without her diamonds. When the waitress returns the diamonds to Laura, Laura says that she wants to touch her. She becomes uncomfortable at first, but realizes it is not bad.

=== Samantha ===
A woman named Samantha who has an anus for a mouth and a mouth for an anus goes to a restaurant without a face covering to express herself. She posts a photo of herself on Instagram, but gets taken down for nudity. Samantha runs into two boys who harass her, but she escapes and accidentally runs over someone.

On Samantha's birthday, her father gives her a unicorn mask to hide her face, but she does not like the gift. Her father only wants Samantha to be careful because her mother was born with the same condition that she has. Samantha runs into the two boys again and they sexually assault her when they see her mouth anus. Samantha thinks about committing suicide by jumping off a cliff and getting into a trainwreck, but passes out.

=== Ana, Guille, and Ernesto ===
Ernesto is masturbating to a picture of his deformed girlfriend, Ana, and gets caught by his mother who has a panic attack and kicks him out. Ana is cheating on Ernesto with a burn-victim named Guille because she wants someone to love her for the way she looks.

Ernesto visits Ana to ask to move in with her and tells Ana that he has not told his mom about their relationship because his mother wants him to date non-deformed girls. Ana asks if Ernesto likes her or her deformity to which he responds her. Ana does not believe him and ends their relationship. Guille finds a briefcase full of money, happy that he can use the money for plastic surgery. Ana is upset by this because she thinks that he should be okay with the way he looks, but decides to end their relationship and love herself for the way she is.

Ernesto who is homeless finds Samantha laying on the street and falls in love with her.

=== Cristian ===
A teenage boy named Cristian is in a therapy session with his mother, Claudia. The therapist tells them that Cristian suffers from body integrity identity disorder because he wants to get rid of his legs to become a mermaid. When the therapist asks him if he wants to see his father, Claudia gets angry at him thinking he is stupid then forces him to get out of his wheelchair and pulls his pants down to show self harm scars, causing him to run away.

Cristian puts his legs on the road to amputate them by having someone, in this case Samantha, run over them. He smiles before dying. Claudia meets Cristian's father who appears to be Simon. Simon says that he left their family so he would not sexually abuse their son and the mom tells him that she would have had an abortion. Simon then looks into Cristian's backpack and sees a photo of himself with a mermaid tattoo and cries of guilt.

=== Vanesa ===
Vanesa is a little person who works in a teddy bear show, but wants to quit because the audiences love the character, but not her. She then discovers that she is pregnant and wants to give her child a life she never had, but learns that the baby will also have dwarfism.

Vanesa tries to quit her job, but her boss does not let her. Her boss tries to give her money to change her mind, but she throws the briefcase full of money out the window and her boss runs after it and dies. Guille was there witnessing the death and saw the briefcase.

The waitress and Laura fall in love. Guille gets his surgery. Samantha and Ernesto are in a romantic relationship. Vanesa has her baby. Cristian is now happy in his afterlife as a mermaid.

== Cast ==
- Macarena Gómez as Laura
- Ana Polvorosa as Samantha
- Carolina Bang as an unnamed psychiatrist
- Jon Kortajarena as Guille
- Candela Peña as Ana
- Secun de la Rosa as Ernesto
- Carmen Machi as Claudia
- Ana María Ayala as Vanesa
- Joaquín Climent as Vanesa's manager
- Eloi Costa as Cristian
- Antonio Durán Morris as Simón
- Itziar Castro as Itziar
- Lle Godoy as Mikel

== See also ==
- List of Spanish films of 2017
