= Macarena Gómez =

Spanish actress (born 1978)

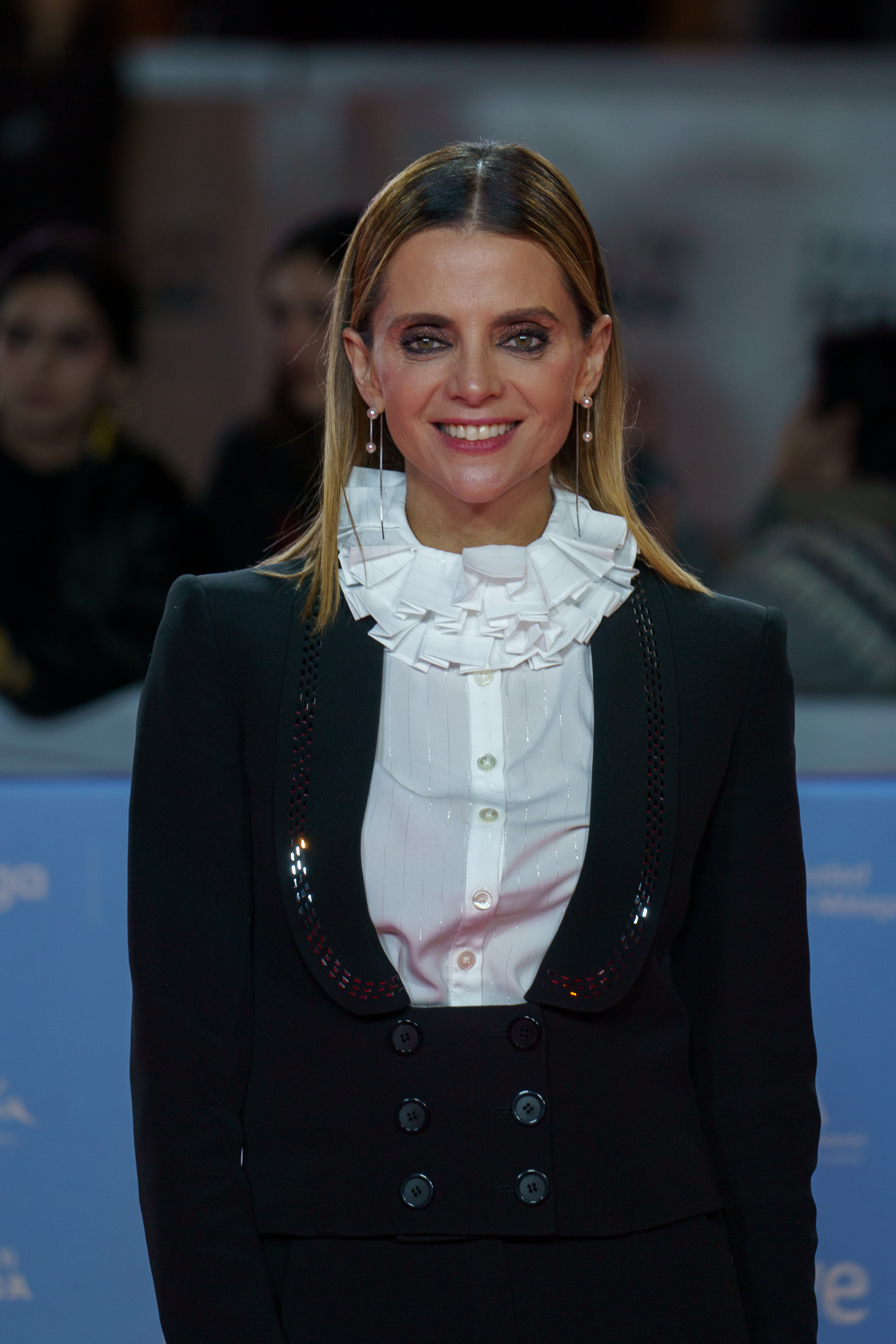
- Gómez in 2025
- Born: Macarena Gómez Traseira; 2 February 1978 (age 48); Córdoba, Spain
- Education: Rose Bruford College
- Occupation: Actress
- Years active: 1994–present
- Spouse: Aldo Comas (m. 2013)

Macarena Gómez Traseira (born 2 February 1978) is a Spanish actress. She became known for her many roles in fantasy and horror films. From 2007 to 2020, she played the role of Lola in the television series La que se avecina.

== Career ==
Born on 2 February 1978 in Córdoba, she joined the Maruja Caracuel's Ballet School at a young age. She completed her secondary education in the United States. She trained for three years at the Rose Bruford College of Speech and Drama in London, moving to Madrid afterwards.

After some minor roles in television starting in 1999 (Raquel busca su sitio, El comisario), her film debut was the 2001 cosmic horror movie Dagon, portraying mermaid-like priestess Uxía Cambarro. She also starred in the 2008 comedy-horror film Sexykiller.

By the end of 2013, right after the beginning of the new season of the soap opera La que se avecina, Macarena Gómez starts presenting TV commercials for the Spanish banking group Bankia.

In 2018 she played Dolores in the biography drama historical film El fotógrafo de Mauthausen along with Mario Casas and Alain Hernández.

== Private life ==
In June 2013, Macarena Gómez married musician and film director Aldo Comas.

== Filmography ==
| Year | Title | Role | Notes | Ref. |
|---|---|---|---|---|
| 2001 | Dagon, la secta del mar (Dagon) | Uxía | | |
| 2003 | Platillos volantes (Flying Saucers) | María | | |
| 2005 | El Calentito | Leo | | |
| 2005 | 20 centímetros (20 Centimeters) | Rebeca | | |
| 2006 | La dama boba (The Idiot Maiden) | Nise | | |
| 2008 | Sexykiller | Bárbara | | |
| 2010 | Carne de neón (Neon Flesh) | La Canija | | |
| 2011 | Verbo | Prosak | | |
| 2012 | Holmes & Watson. Madrid Days | Berna | | |
| 2013 | Las brujas de Zugarramurdi (Witching & Bitching) | Silvia | | |
| 2014 | Musarañas (Shrew's Nest) | Montse | | |
| 2015 | Los héroes del mal (The Heroes of Evil) | Prostituta | | |
| 2016 | Secuestro (Boy Missing) | Raquel | | |
| 2017 | Pieles (Skins) | Laura | | |
| 2017 | The Black Gloves | | | |
| 2018 | El fotógrafo de Mauthausen (The Photographer of Mauthausen) | Dolores | | |
| 2019 | El crack cero | Luisa | | |
| 2019 | Los Rodríguez y el más allá | Natalia | | |
| 2021 | Y todos arderán (Everyone Will Burn) | María José | | |
| 2023 | El hombre del saco (The Boogeyman: The Origin of the Myth) | Claudia | | |

- Mi Otro Jon (2023), by Paco Arango
- The Game of the Cheetah (2022), by Dan Pero Manescu
- La Déesse du Crépuscule (2021), by Dan Pero Manescu
- Confinamiento Incluido (2021), by Miguel Martí
- Nadie muere en Ambrosía (2020), by Héctor Valdez
- 75 días (2020), by Marc Romero
- Quiero contarte algo' (2020), by J.K. Álvarez
- The Rodriguez and the Beyond (2019), by Paco Arango
- Instant Love (2019), by Suso Imbernón and Juanjo Moscardó Rius
- The Crack: Inception (2019), by José Luis Garci
- Trivial (2019), by Sandra Reina and Fran Menchón
- El Cerro de los Dioses (2019), by Daniel M. Caneiro
- Boi (2019), by Jorge M. Fontana
- Camisa de fuerza (2018), by Ivan Mulero
- Affection (2018), by Ángel Gómez Hernández
- Up Among the Stars (2018), by Zoe Berriatúa
- Black Label (2018), by David Vergés
- Bicho (2018), by Christopher Cartagena González
- Ma Belle (2017), by Antoni Caimari Caldés
- Killing God (2017), by Caye Casas and Albert Pintó
- Relaxing Cup of Coffee (2016), by José Semprún
- 249. La noche en que una becaria encontró a Emiliano Revilla (2016) by Luis María Ferrández
- El desconcierto (2016), by Alberto Carpintero
- Behind (2016), by Ángel Gómez Hernández
- It's My Closet and I Cry If I Want To (2016), by Inés de León
- Void Chair (2016), by Xavier Miralles
- Hijas (2015), by J. Prada and K. Prada
- The Horror Network Vol. 1 (2015), by: Brian Dorton, Joseph Graham, Manuel Marín, Lee Matthews, Douglas Conner and Ignacio Martín Lerma
- Vostok (2015), by Miquel Casals
- Una mañana cualquiera (2015), by Miguel Martí
- Witch Girl (2014), by Ricardo Uhagon Vivas
- Vibraciones (2014), by Miguel Martí and Alberto Ros
- Bath Time (2014), by Eduardo Casanova
- Blink (2013), by Diego Latorre
- Al final todos mueren (2013), by: David Galán Galindo, Roberto Pérez Toledo, Pablo Vara, Javier Botet and Javier Fesser
- Las cinco crisis del Apocalipsis (2013), by Manu Ochoa
- La niña (2012), by Alberto Carpintero
- Papá te quiere mucho (2012), by Lucía Valverde
- Ratas (2012), by Jota Linares
- Y la muerte lo seguía (2012), by Ángel Gómez Hernández
- The Summer Side (2012), by Antonia San Juan
- The Curse (2012), by Aldo Comas
- Intereses Mundanos Bar Mut (2011), by Christian Molina and Serpico Ramses Albiñana
- The Norm (2011), by J. Prada and K. Prada
- La última víctima (2011), by Ángel Gómez Hernández
- Merry Little Christmas (2011), by Manuel Marín and Ignacio Martín Lerma
- Cementerio de elefantes (2011), by Darío Paso
- Mi primer amanecer (2011), by Chus Gutiérrez
- Quédate conmigo (2010), by Zoe Berriatúa
- Miedo (2010), by Jaume Balagueró
- Esto no es amor (2010), by Javier San Román
- Carlota (2009), by Jorge Mañes and Nilo Mur
- Un suceso neurasténico en la vida de Ernesto Cadorna (2009), by Fernando Ronchese
- Marisa (2009), by Nacho Vigalondo
- Epílogo (2008), by Zoe Berriatúa
- Vámonos de aquí (2008), by Nydia García
- 4000 euros (2008) by Richard Jordan
- La noche que dejó de llover (2008), by Alfonso Zarauza
- Mejor que nunca (2008), by Dolores Payás
- Acción reacción (2008), by David Ilundain
- Sr. Rosso (2007), by Jaume Balagueró
- Películas para no dormir: Para entrar a vivir (2006), by Jaume Balagueró
- Contracuerpo (2005) by Eduardo Chapero-Jackson
- Luminaria (2005), by Álvaro Giménez Sarmiento
- Diario de un skin (2005), by Jacobo Rispa
- Hot milk (2005), by Ricardo Bofill
- Rapados (2004), by Román Parrado
- Romasanta: The Werewolf Hunt (2004), by Paco Plaza
- Aurora Borealis (2004), by Lisbeth Dreyer
- Nieves (2003), by Alberto Palma
- Un mystique determinado (2003), by Carles Congost
- S Club Seeing Double (2003), by Nigel Dick
- Una pasión singular (2003), by Antonio Gonzalo
- O'Donnell 21 (2002), by Yoel Dahan
- Rosas rotas (2001), by Aleix Masferrer López

Television

| Year | Title | Role | Notes | Ref. |
|---|---|---|---|---|
| 2000 | Raquel busca su sitio | | Television debut | |
| 2002 | Hospital Central | Adela | | |
| 2002 | Padre coraje | Susana Aguilar "la Susi" | | |
| 2003 | La vida de Rita | Lorena | | |
| 2005 | Al filo de la ley | Gemma | | |
| 2006 | Divinos | Pochi | | |
| 2007–20 | La que se avecina | Lola | | |
| 2016 | El hombre de tu vida | Ana María | | |
| 2017 | Sé quién eres | Natalia | | |
| 2017–18 | Dorien | Marta | | |
| 2020− | 30 monedas (30 Coins) | Mercedes Gandía | | |
| 2022 | Sagrada familia (Holy Family) | Blanca | | |
