= Cannon Fodder (film) =

- Film poster
- Directed by: Eitan Gafny
- Written by: Eitan Gafny; Amit Lior
- Produced by: Ishay Mor
- Starring: Liron Levo; Yafit Shalev; Roi Miller
- Cinematography: Roee Keren
- Edited by: Gill Weinstein
- Production companies: White Beach Productions; Israeli Film Fund
- Distributed by: Screen Media Films
- Release date: May 10, 2013 (CFIFF)
- Country: Israel
- Language: Hebrew

Cannon Fodder (Hebrew: בשר תותחים), also known by the alternate titles of Basar Totahim and Battle of the Undead, is a 2013 Israeli horror film that was directed by Eitan Gafny, based on a script written by Gafny and Amit Lior, and is Gafny's feature film directorial debut. The film had its world premiere on 10 May 2013 at the Cape Fear Independent Film Festival and stars Liron Levo as a security operative sent to Lebanon on a final mission, only to discover that his opponents are of the dead.

Cannon Fodder has been billed as Israel's "first full length zombie film".

== Synopsis ==
Doron (Liron Levo) is a security operative sent to Lebanon with the mission to capture Manzur, one of the people in charge of the terrorist organization Hezbollah. He's promised that this will be his very last mission and that afterwards he will be left to build a family with his new wife. Fueled by this promise, Doron enters the town where his target is rumored to be hiding but soon discovers that it is filled with infected people intent on biting and spreading a strange new disease. Doron discovers Manzur's daughter Noelle (Yafit Shalev), who claims that her father had actually been working with Israel on a new biological weapon. Now Doron and the others must find a way to stay alive and get to safety.

== Cast ==
- Liron Levo as Doron
- Yafit Shalev as Noelle
- Roi Miller as Daniel
- Emos Ayeno as Moti
- Amit Leor as Gideon
- Shira Katzenelenbogen as Michal

== Production ==
Gafny first came up with the initial idea for the film when he was 11 years old, when he viewed the George A. Romero films Night of the Living Dead and Dawn of the Dead. He thought that it would be interesting to have a similar film set in Lebanon, featuring the Israel Defense Forces fighting zombies. Of the film's zombies, Gafny has stated that they are not meant to be seen as representative for either side of the Middle Eastern conflicts and that for him, the zombies represent hope. Funding for Cannon Fodder came from multiple sources, including Israeli government-affiliated film funds and a partially successful IndieGoGo campaign. The script's first draft took two weeks to complete and after re-writes and editing, the script for Cannon Fodder was completed in about three months.

== Reception ==
Reviewers for Grolsch Film Works and What Culture both panned Cannon Fodder, and What Culture wrote "Though spritely shot, the first Israeli zombie flick does little to elevate itself above the garden variety entries to the genre, suffering from poor acting, a generic plot, and laughable visual effects." In contrast, Ain't It Cool News and Nerdly both wrote favorable reviews for Cannon Fodder, and Nerdly commented "As surprising as much as it is stereotypical, Cannon Fodder is hands down THE best horror film to come out of Israel, easily surpassing Keshales and Papushado’s Rabies. For me Israeli horror has a new standard to live up to in Eitan Gafny’s superb zombie flick.

=== Awards ===
- Festival Prize for Best Feature Film at the Fright Night Film Fest (2013, won)
- Festival Prize for Best Practical Special Effects at the Fright Night Film Fest (2013, won)
