= Film Base Berlin =

German film production company

Film Base Berlin GmbH is a film production company located in Berlin, Germany. The company was founded by Mathias Schwerbrock and has produced such films as Don 2 and Nightsongs. In 2011 Film Base service produced The Berlin File for RHYOO Seung Wan, that was partly shot in Berlin and was service producer on the international TV-Series The Transporter for Atlantique Films in Paris starring Chris Vance. Film Base Berlin also co-produced the documentary Recognition (Hakara), directed by Sharon Ryba-Kahn which was shot in Israel. The company shares producer credits on the film The Interrogation, an Israeli-Germany co-production directed by Erez Pery. The film is co-produced by the Israel-based Daroma Productions. In 2015 the feature film The Cakemaker, a co-production with the Tel Aviv-based Laila Films, is being shot in Berlin and Jerusalem. In 2017 Film Base Berlin service produces parts of the TV Series The Man In The High Castle for AMAZON, followed by a service production in 2018 for Killing Eve (BBC US). Serviceproductions for And Now, Love (2019) followed by Storylines and Love Gets A Room and Bawaal (India). From 2020 until 2022 the company service produces the documentary ELDORADO, everything the Nazis hate for NETFLIX with Mathias Schwerbrock as a producer. In 2023 the script for the feature film A Road Without A Name gets developed with director Tamara Erde and is currently in development and financing, to be shot in Israel and Germany in 2025.

== Credits ==
Year	Film
1989	Lumen
1991	Killing Boxes
2004	Nightsongs
2011	The Transporter
2011	Don 2
2013	The Berlin File
2015	Recognition
2015	Underground Fragrance
2016	The Intererrogation
2017	The Man in the High Castle
2017	The Cakemaker
2018	Delphi Rationale
2018	Killing Eve
2019	Them
2019	The Sacrifice, development
2019	And Now, Love
2020	The Storylines
2020	Rostocken, development
2020	Trauma, development
2021	Love Gets a Room
2022	Eldorado, Everything the Nazis Hate
2020	Vater, Sohn und der Preis des Widerstands, development
2023	Bawaal
2024	After the Evil, Associate Production
2025 (in development)	A Road Without a Name
