= Noche Hache =

- Genre: Chat show
- Presented by: Eva Hache
- Starring: Quequé; Fernando Gil; Ricardo Castella; Javier Coronas; Agurne Anasagasti; Julián López; Marta Nebot
- Country of origin: Spain
- Original language: Spanish
- No. of seasons: 3

Production
- Producer: Globomedia
- Running time: Approx. 90 minutes

Original release
- Network: Cuatro
- Release: 7 November 2005 – 5 June 2008

Noche hache was a late-night chat show produced by Globomedia and broadcast on Cuatro between 7 November 2005 and 5 June 2008. The show, broadcast from Monday to Thursday every week in the midnight slot, was a nightly comedy programme, presented by actress and comedienne Eva Hache, who gave her name to the show, in collaboration with various comedians with their own slots. The show was written by a team of fifteen writers led by Eduardo Arroyo for each of the three series. The show won various awards, including the Premios Ondas, and its popularity has had it considered one of the most popular shows of Cuatro's first few years.

== History ==
It started broadcasting on 7 November 2005 during the launch gala Hoy no estrenamos programa, estrenamos cadena, as its first broadcast coincided with the launch of the Cuatro channel. In the first series, the show was presented by Eva Hache, accompanied by six other comedians: Ricardo Castella, Quequé, Richard Collins-Moore, Marta Nebot and Fernando Gil.

In the second series, premiered on 12 September 2006, the team underwent some changes: Julián López was brought in to cover sports news, and Javier Coronas replaced Collins-Moore as war correspondent. In addition, Las noticias del guiñol, a programme until then in a timeslot of its own, was incorporated as a new segment.

In the third and final series, premiered on 10 September 2007, Agurne Anasagasti was introduced as a reporter. The programme ended on 5 June 2008, when Eva Hache decided to take a year off from broadcasting.

== Segments ==
=== Monólogo (Monologue) ===
The programme started with every night with a comedic monologue performed by Eva Hache, about some of the day's news. Parts of these monologues were later entered into a book. Hache would also form a mock parliament before every show.

=== Analísis politico (Political analysis) ===
Ricardo Castella analysed the current situation of Spanish and international affairs, with a small bit of humour and satire. Tired of the perceived political deadlock, the storyline is that Castella has created his own political party Ya os vale ("It's worth it"). Every Thursday, Castella turned his segment into Buenas malas noticias ("Good Bad News"); he swaps his usual suit for a Hawaiian shirt and no matter how bad the news is, he tries to look on the bright side. As he would always remind the viewers at the end, "A partir de ahora, cuando vean una mala noticia, acuérdense de mí y piensen... ¡Pues tampoco es pa' tanto!" - "From now on, when you see a bad news story, remember me and think... well, it's not that big of a deal!"

=== La guerra de los medios (The media war) ===
A segment presented by Quequé, usually airing on Mondays. It talks of (in a comedic manner) the disagreements and inconsistencies between different media outlets; be that radio, television or internet. Quequé tended to focus on the Cadena COPE broadcaster Federico Jiménez Losantos' disagreements with the PRISA media group and the Spanish Government, by zapping (collecting clips from) Losantos' programme. Towards the end of the programme's run, it regularly featured El Mundo journalist Fernando Sánchez Dragó and his colleagues.

A similar version of this segment, La guerra de las medias, was often included on Wednesdays, in which Quequé would instead spoof tabloid gossip from throughout the week.

=== FF: El informe Fernando (FF: The Fernando Report) ===
Fernando Gil would go out onto the streets and, knowing what was happening where he was, interview everyone from passersby to lecturers, celebrities and politicians.

=== Reportero de guerra (War Reporter) ===
Introduced in the second series, Javier Coronas reports on news wherever and whenever it occurs, replacing Richard Collins-Moore, who was, according to the show's plot, kidnapped by Islamist terrorists.

== Partido Hache ==
On 6 September 2007, at the start of the third series, it was announced that the show would become a political party, under the name Partido hache, to run in the 2008 general election in the Madrid constituency. The party's aim was "to bring the rules of democracy closer to the people without harming Spanish political life". Its slogan was: "There are many parties without a programme, but there is only one programme with a party", referring to the chat show.

Eva Hache stood for the party as a candidate for Prime Minister of Spain, and successfully ascertained the required 35 members to register as a party: most of these were co-hosts on the show. However, three days before polling day, Partido Hache withdrew from the elections, citing poor electoral performance, and that winning would mean Eva Hache would have to leave the programme.

== Awards and nominations ==
- Premios ATV 2005
  - Nominated for best writing
  - Nominated for best director (Eduardo Arroyo/Cristina López)
  - Won best entertainment programme presenter (Eva Hache)
- Premios Zapping 2005
  - Nominated for best presenter (Eva Hache)
- TP de Oro 2005
  - Nominated for best entertainment programme
  - Nominated for best variety show presenter (Eva Hache)
- Premios ATV 2006
  - Nominated for best director (Eduardo Arroyo/Cristina López)
  - Nominated for best entertainment programme presenter (Eva Hache)
- TP de Oro 2006
  - Nominated for best variety show presenter (Eva Hache)
- Premios Ondas 2007
  - Won best entertainment programme
