= Ofir Raul Graizer =

Israeli film director

- אופיר ראול גרייצר
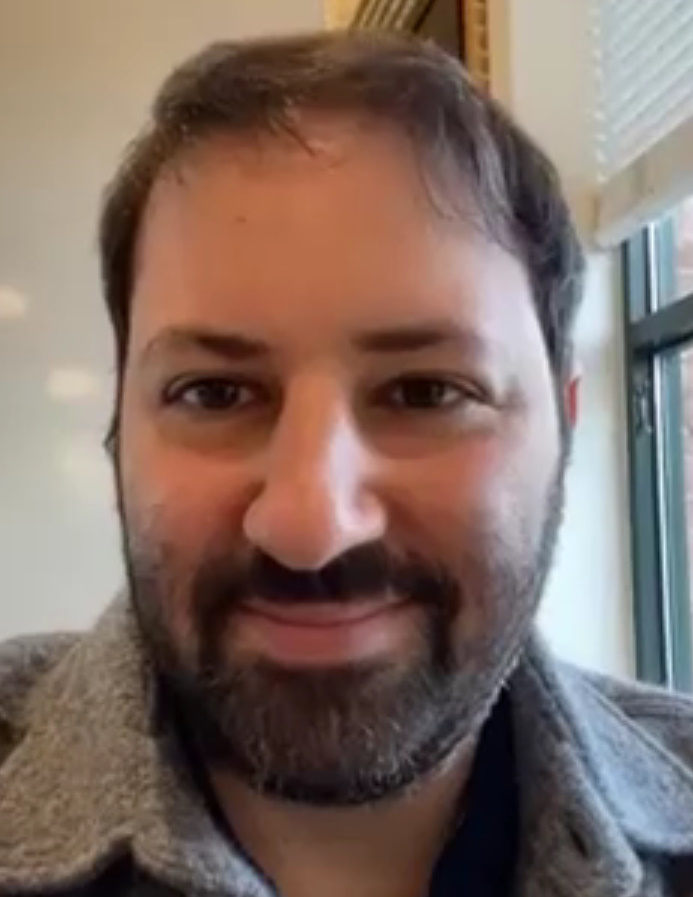
- Graizer in 2022
- Born: September 10, 1981 (age 44); Ra'anana, Israel
- Occupations: Film director, screenwriter, producer, editor

Ofir Raul Graizer (Hebrew: אופיר ראול גרייצר; born September 10, 1981) is an Israeli film director, screenwriter, producer and editor. Graizer was born in Israel. He lives in Berlin. He is best known for his feature film debut, The Cakemaker. It was the Israeli submission for the Academy Award in 2019, won seven Ophir Awards in 2018 at the Israeli Academy, including Best Picture, Best Director, Best Script and Best Actress. Graizer published a book of short stories and recipes, Ofirs Kuche (Ofir's Kitchen), in Germany in November 2018. He lives between Israel, Germany and the United States, and works internationally. The movie, inspired by Graizer's own experiences and those of a friend, is a love story and includes issues surrounding being gay. Graizer is himself gay.

Graizer graduated from Sapir College in Sderot, Israel. He directed several short films that were shown in festivals, including Cannes and Clermont Ferrand. He is an alumnus of Berlinale Talents.

== Early life ==
Graizer was born and raised in Ra'anana, Israel to a religious father and secular mother. He grew up being a fan of movies from a young age, especially horror films, old Italian films, and early films of Tim Burton. After finishing high school, Graizer worked selling clothing, in a bookstore, as a room service waiter at a hotel, and in various kitchen jobs.

Graizer eventually went to Sapir College, the audio and visual arts school in Sderot, Israel, where he studied filmmaking. A Prayer In January, his first year, student, short film, screened in more than 20 international film festivals and received distribution in Germany. The short trailer for A Prayer In January was viewed online more than 3 million times. Graizer's graduate film, Dor, garnered awards and was screened in festivals around the world. During his time at Sapir, Graizer also edited several award-winning documentary feature films. After graduating with a BFA Graizer left Sderot and began living between Berlin and Jerusalem.

== Career ==
In 2010, Graizer started developing his first feature film The Cakemaker with the independent producer Itai Tamir. Graizer received a grant from the Jerusalem Film Fund to help develop The Cakemaker, as well as a scholarship to The Nipkow Programm in Berlin.

Graizer tried unsuccessfully to finance The Cakemaker for seven years. During that time he supported himself by catering, serving as a private chef, editing pornographic films and mostly he was a cooking instructor at several culinary schools in Berlin. In 2015, co-producer Mathias Schwerbrock joined the production of The Cakemaker.

In 2015, Graizer was invited to participate in The Chile Factory, where he co-directed the short film La Discotheque, which premiered in Cannes Quainzaine.

In 2018, The Cakemaker won seven Ophir Awards by the Israeli Academy of Film and Television, and became Israel's official entry to the 2019 Oscars in the Best Foreign Film category. It was sold for a remake in USA.

In 2022, his second feature, America, premiered at the Karlovy Vary International Film Festival.

== Personal life ==
Graizer is vegetarian. He came out as gay at the age of 16. He is married.
