= The Last Circus =

2010 Spanish comedy horror-drama film

- Theatrical release poster
- Spanish: Balada triste de trompeta
- Directed by: Álex de la Iglesia
- Written by: Álex de la Iglesia
- Produced by: Vérane Frédiani; Gerardo Herrero; Franck Ribière
- Starring: Carlos Areces; Antonio de la Torre; Carolina Bang
- Cinematography: Kiko de la Rica
- Edited by: Alejandro Lázaro
- Music by: Roque Baños
- Production companies: Tornasol Films; Castafiore Films; La Fabrique 2
- Distributed by: Warner Bros. Pictures (Spain); SND Films (France)
- Release dates: 7 September 2010 (Venice); 17 December 2010 (Spain); 22 July 2011 (Spain)
- Running time: 107 minutes
- Countries: Spain; France
- Language: Spanish
- Budget: €7 million
- Box office: $3.3 million

The Last Circus (Spanish: Balada triste de trompeta; transl. 'Sad Trumpet Ballad') is a 2010 comedy horror-drama film written and directed by Álex de la Iglesia, which stars Carlos Areces, Antonio de la Torre and Carolina Bang. It premiered at the 2010 Venice Film Festival.

== Plot ==
In 1937, Republican Militia force a circus troupe to fight on their side in the Spanish Civil War. The Funny Clown (Santiago Segura) slaughters dozens of Nationalist troops, armed only with a machete, before being shot and disarmed. While his fellow troupe members are executed, the Funny Clown is sentenced to work as a slave laborer, at the monument of the Valle de los Caídos. His son, Javier (Sasha Di Bendetto) tries to free him by setting off dynamite where he was working. But Colonel Salcedo (Sancho Gracia) tramples the Funny Clown to death with his horse. Javier knocks him down, gouging out his eye in the process. Salcedo vows to remember Javier for this insult.

In 1973, Javier (Carlos Areces) joins a circus as its sad clown, following his father's wishes. His counterpart as funny clown is Sergio (Antonio de la Torre), an arrogant, alcoholic, crude, mysogynist and violent man who admits that if he wasn't a clown, he would probably be a murderer. Javier begins to fall in love with Sergio's girlfriend, the trapeze artist Natalia (Carolina Bang). After Sergio becomes drunk and enraged at dinner one night, Sergio beats Natalia unconscious then storms out. Javier encourages Natalia to leave Sergio, but when Sergio returns she engages in rough sex against a window while Javier cowers below. She later tells Javier that she is sexually and emotionally attracted to Sergio's violent nature.

Sergio admits that Javier is an excellent sad clown but grows suspicious about his attention to Natalia. Natalia encourages Javier to develop feelings for her, as she was impressed by his refusal to laugh at an offensive joke told by Sergio at dinner previously. They begin to see one another behind Sergio's back. One night, at an amusement park, Natalia admits she has begun to love Javier as well and kisses him tenderly. Sergio suddenly appears and beats them both savagely; Javier's wounds land him in the hospital. Natalia tells Javier they must never see one another again for his sake. After having a dream in which Sergio foils his repeated attempts to rescue Natalia from various situations, Javier escapes from the hospital and returns to the circus. Despite the efforts of the other troupe members to stop him, Javier finds Sergio and Natalia having sex. Now insane, Javier beats Sergio mercilessly in the face with a trumpet, leaving him mauled and near death. As Javier escapes through the sewers, the circus troupe takes Sergio to the closest doctor – a veterinarian – for medical care. The doctor is able to save Sergio, but his face is horribly scarred with a glasgow smile. The circus is forced to close down. Natalia and several of the other troupe members become performers in a nightclub.

Javier lives in the forest, naked and covered in filth. He survives on wild animals that fall into his cave. One day he is captured by hunters – including Salcedo, who recognizes him. Salcedo forces him to behave as a hunting dog but ultimately intends to kill him. At one point Javier viciously bites Generalísimo Francisco Franco, one of Salcedo's guests. As a consequence he is locked in a room while Salcedo plans exactly how to kill him. Javier has a vision of Natalia, as the Virgin Mary, ordering him to become her Angel of Death. He scars his face with sodium hydroxide and a clothes iron to make it look permanently like that of a clown, then dons a clown's costume patterned after a bishop's vestments. He then kills Salcedo and escapes into the city.

Afraid that Sergio intends to harm her, Natalia prepares to leave the nightclub. Sergio and Javier both arrive at the same time, Javier armed with machine guns. Forced to choose between them, Natalia chooses Sergio, and they drive away together. Police try to arrest Javier, but some of the remaining troupe members help him escape. Repulsed by Sergio's mauled face and crude ways, Natalia leaves him again. Javier steals an ice cream truck and stalks her through the city. He uses the occasion of ETA's successful attempt on Admiral Carrero Blanco (Franco's heir apparent) to kidnap Natalia. He takes her to the Valle de los Caídos, hewn from rock, where the circus has kept its animals since going out of business. There he pleads with her to love him for his mind and body as much as she loved Sergio for his. At first she refuses but admits she no longer loves Sergio.

Sergio, meanwhile, has learned of Javier's hideout. He informs the military police, which has been looking for Javier in connection with the terrorist bombing, and accompanies them on their attempt to arrest him. Sergio puts on his clown make up and chases Javier and Natalia through the Monumental Cross at the Valle de los Caídos (a visual homage to the climactic Mount Rushmore scene in the Hitchcock classic North by Northwest). They proceed to climb to the highest point of the cross, several hundred feet above the ground. Natalia admits her love for Javier and they attempt to escape by wrapping lengths of drapery around their waists and lowering themselves to the ground. Before this can be accomplished, Sergio arrives and fights with Javier. Seeing an opportunity to save Javier, by ensnaring Sergio's leg in drapery, Natalia leaps from the ledge, dragging Sergio with her. Natalia is killed when the drapery draws taut around her waist and snaps her spine.

The military police place Sergio and Javier in custody. As they sit opposite one another, the Funny Clown and the Sad Clown begin crying so hard, it appears they are laughing.

== Cast ==
- Carlos Areces as Javier
- Carolina Bang as Natalia
- Antonio de la Torre as Sergio
- Manuel Tallafé as Ramiro
- Alejandro Tejería as Ghost Rider
- Manuel Tejada as Ringmaster
- Paco Sagarzazu as Anselmo
- Santiago Segura as Clown
- Fernando Guillén Cuervo as Military captain
- Sancho Gracia as Coronel Salcedo
- Enrique Villén as Andrés
- Gracia Olayo as Sonsoles
- Raúl Arévalo as Carlos
- Josean Bengoetxea as Millionaire
- Terele Pávez as Dolores
- Juana Cordero as Mum
- Joaquín Climent as Dad
- Luis Varela as Veterinary
- Fran Perea as National Soldier
- Javier Botet as Preso

== Production ==
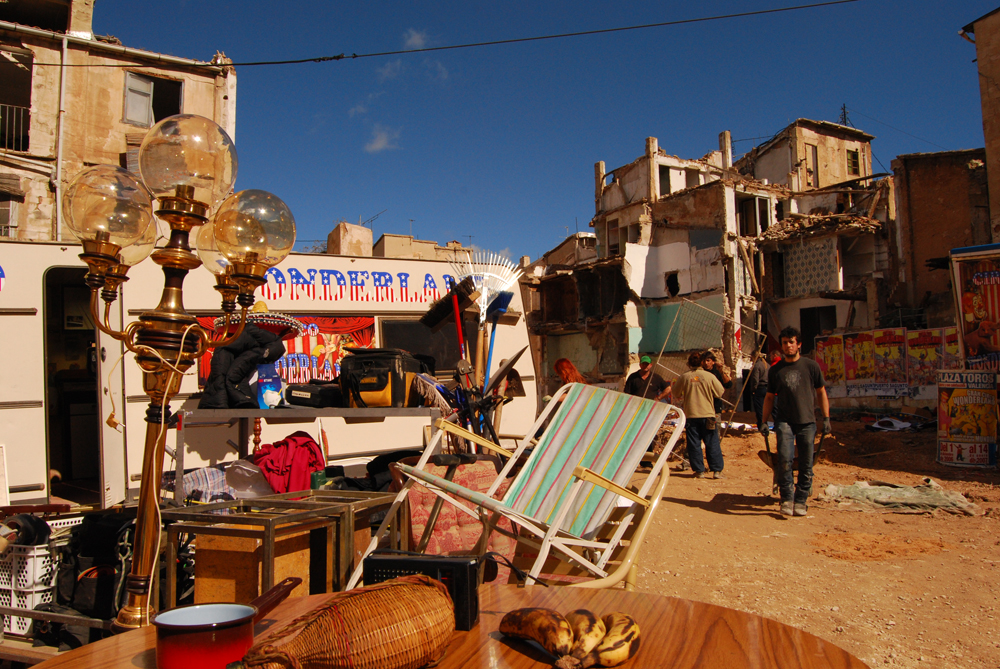
Film set in Alcoy.

Produced by Tornasol Films, Castafiore Films and La Fabrique 2 with the participation of TVE and Canal+, the film began shooting on 18 January 2010. The film was shot in Madrid as well as at the Ciudad de la Luz studio in Alicante. The neighborhood of El Partidor (in a state of urban decay) in Alcoy also served as shooting location.

== Reception ==
The film received positive reviews; it currently holds a score of 77% on Rotten Tomatoes with the consensus being that the film was "an uneven but winningly insane blend of hard violence, sex, black humor, and social satire."

Cole Abaius wrote that "Over all, the film is incredible. In the oldest sense of that word, it is awe-inspiring and grotesque. Stunning and heartfelt. It is a love letter to a country, a time and a frowning clown singing mournfully about a weeping trumpet."

== Awards ==
At the 67th Venice International Film Festival the film was nominated for the Golden Lion and Álex de la Iglesia received the Silver Lion award for Best Director. The film received the Méliès d'Or for Best European Fantastic Film.

Year	Award	Category	Nominee(s)	Result	Ref.
2010	67th Venice International Film Festival	Golden Lion		Nominated	
2010	67th Venice International Film Festival	Silver Lion for Best Direction	Álex de la Iglesia	Won	
2010	67th Venice International Film Festival	Golden Osella for Best Screenplay	Álex de la Iglesia	Won	
2011	25th Goya Awards	Best Film		Nominated	
2011	25th Goya Awards	Best Director	Álex de la Iglesia	Nominated	
2011	25th Goya Awards	Best Original Screenplay	Álex de la Iglesia	Nominated	
2011	25th Goya Awards	Best Original Score	Roque Baños	Nominated	
2011	25th Goya Awards	Best Actor	Antonio de la Torre	Nominated	
2011	25th Goya Awards	Best Supporting Actress	Terele Pávez	Nominated	
2011	25th Goya Awards	Best New Actress	Carolina Bang	Nominated	
2011	25th Goya Awards	Best Production Supervision	Yousaf Bokhari	Nominated	
2011	25th Goya Awards	Best Cinematography	Kiko de la Rica	Nominated	
2011	25th Goya Awards	Best Editing	Alejandro Lázaro	Nominated	
2011	25th Goya Awards	Best Art Direction	Edou Hydallgo	Nominated	
2011	25th Goya Awards	Best Costume Design	Paco Delgado	Nominated	
2011	25th Goya Awards	Best Makeup and Hairstyles	José Quetglas, Pedro Rodríguez "Pedrati", Nieves Sánchez Torres	Won	
2011	25th Goya Awards	Best Sound	Charly Schmukler, Diego Garrido, Charly Schmukler	Nominated	
2011	25th Goya Awards	Best Special Effects	Reyes Abades, Ferran Piquer	Won	
2011	Méliès d'Or	Best European Fantastic Film		Won	
2012	17th Forqué Awards	Best Film		Nominated	

== See also ==
- List of Spanish films of 2010
