= Eva Hache =

Spanish actress

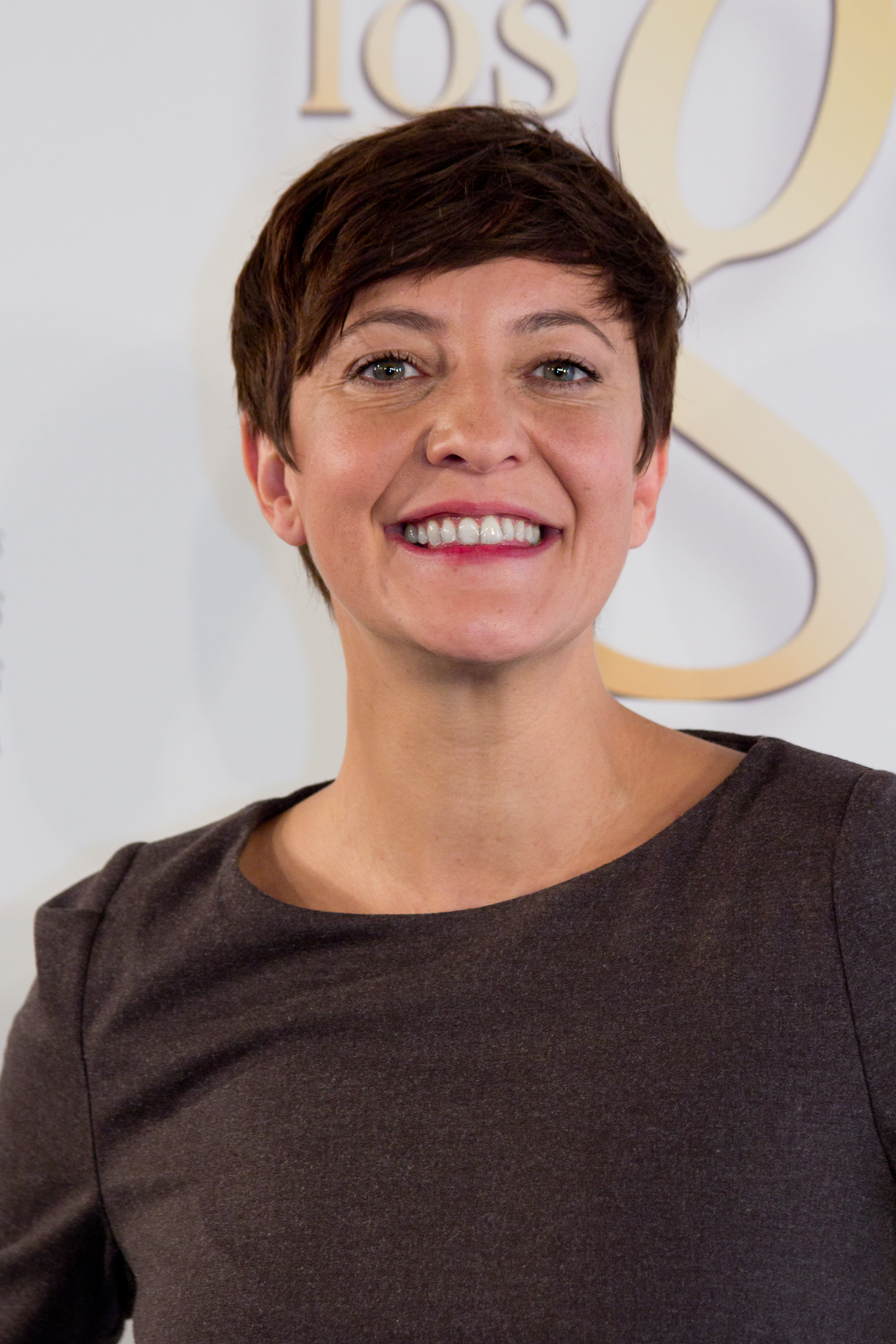
- Hache at the 27th Goya Awards in 2013
- Born: Eva María Hernández Villegas; 7 August 1971 (age 55); Segovia, Castile and León, Spain
- Occupations: Actress, choreographer, comedian and TV presenter
- Years active: 2002—present
- Spouse: Jöns Andres Papila (2010-present)
- Children: Teo (b. 2008)

Eva María Hernández Villegas (born 7 August 1971), better known as Eva Hache, is a Spanish choreographer, comedian, actress and television show hostess. Among other performances, she is known for her late night show Noche hache, and for hosting two successive Goya Awards ceremonies (2012 and 2013).

== Biography ==
Hache was born in Segovia, Castile and León. After majoring in English, she began her career as a stage actress. She performed in several classical plays with director Juan Antonio Quintana's company at the Aula de Teatro of the Universidad de Valladolid. After four years, she decided to take some free time to travel around the world, and on her return in 2000 played in a self-produced cabaret piece, Todo por la Talanga, el Chou, in which the audience played an active role.

She managed to do comedy monologues in several programs for the Paramount Comedy channel until, in 2003, she won the 4th Monologue Contest from the Comedy Club (El Club de la Comedia). After that, she was hired by producer-company Globomedia, which decided she should accompany Manel Fuentes, conductor of the late night show Fuentes y cia, where she would play a comic reporter. She achieved popularity in the show, which enabled her to participate in other shows, such as Splunge (a comic sketches show), and make punctual appearances as an actress in sitcoms, like the popular 7 Vidas and Casi Perfectos.

As a theatre actress, she had main roles in 5mujeres.com (2003–2004) and Hombres, mujeres y punto (2004–2005). Eva Hache has performed in films too, most notably in Locos por el sexo, directed by Javier Rebollo. She has also done radio performances in Cadena Ser's La ventana del verano, hosted by Gemma Nierga.

After that, and still under contract with Globomedia, Hache became the hostess of the late night show Noche Hache (2005-2008), on Cuatro. It was her first work as the main host. She won the 2005 Academy of Television (ATV) Prize, in the Best Entertainment Program Communicator category. That same year she was also nominated for the TP de Oro award for Best Entertainment Program Hostess.

In 2009, she was part of the cast of the Spanish adaptation of Saturday Night Live, which also aired on Cuatro. The show was cancelled due to low ratings.

In 2011, she became the main host of stand-up comedy show El Club de la Comedia, on laSexta, the show where she had first risen to prominence.

In 2012 and 2013, Eva Hache presented the 26th and 27th editions, respectively, of the Goya Awards.

In February 2015, Cuatro aired the first episode of candid camera show Guasabi, hosted by Eva; laSexta, owned by Atresmedia, removed her from El Club de la Comedia due to her working for rival group Mediaset. Cuatro cancelled Guasabi after the first episode due to its poor ratings.

In August 2015, Telecinco announced her as one of the judges of talent competition Got Talent España, Spanish adaptation of the international Got Talent franchise. In 2016, she starred in the Spanish adaptation of TV series Web Therapy on #0. In 2021, she appeared as "Cactus" on the second series of the local The Masked Singer.

In April 2022, she was a special guest in the "Snatch Game" episode of season 2 of the reality competition streaming television series Drag Race España, produced by Atresmedia in collaboration with Buendía Estudios and World of Wonder.

In 2022, she shot her debut as a film director, Un mal día lo tiene cualquiera.
