= The Cakemaker =

2017 film by Ofir Raul Graizer

- Theatrical release poster
- Hebrew: האופה מברלין
- Directed by: Ofir Raul Graizer
- Written by: Ofir Raul Grazier
- Produced by: Itai Tamir
- Starring: Sarah Adler; Tim Kalkhof; Zohar Strauss; Roi Miller; Tamir Ben Yehuda
- Cinematography: Omri Aloni
- Edited by: Michal Oppenheim
- Music by: Dominique Charpentier
- Production companies: Film Base Berlin; Laila Films
- Distributed by: Nachshon Films (Israel); Missingfilms (Germany)
- Release dates: 4 July 2017 (KVIFF); 28 December 2017 (Israel); 1 November 2018 (Germany)
- Running time: 104 minutes
- Countries: Israel; Germany
- Languages: English; Hebrew; German
- Box office: $1.3 million

The Cakemaker (Hebrew: האופה מברלין, romanized: HaOfeh miBerlin, lit. 'The Baker of Berlin'; German: Der Kuchenmacher) is a 2017 Israeli–German romantic drama film directed by Ofir Raul Grazier. It stars Sarah Adler, Tim Kalkhof, Zohar Strauss and Roi Miller.

It premiered at the 52nd Karlovy Vary International Film Festival. It was part of the Official Selection – Competition and won the Prize of the Ecumenical Jury. It received the 2018 Ophir Award for best picture, and was selected as the Israeli entry for the Best Foreign Language Film at the 91st Academy Awards, but it was not nominated.

== Plot ==
Thomas, a young, solitary German baker, is having an affair with a married Israeli man named Oren, who frequently visits Berlin on business. When Oren fails to return Thomas's calls one day, Thomas discovers that he died in an accident in Israel, and he goes to Jerusalem and visits the cafe of Oren's widow, Anat. Without revealing his identity, he gets a job in the cafe's kitchen and rents an apartment in the city. Though at first he is not allowed to make food, as it puts the cafe at risk of losing its kosher certification, Anat eventually tries some baked goods that Thomas made for her son's birthday and allows him to make food.

Thomas learns more about Anat's life and her family, including her brother-in-law, Motti, who is initially suspicious of him. He also grows closer to Anat, who is still grieving her husband's death despite her awareness of his infidelity. Anat is continuously tempted to look through Oren's personal effects, which include notes from his lover and a second phone. Eventually, while preparing a large volume of baked goods for a catering order, Anat makes an advance on Thomas, who hesitantly reciprocates; the two have a short affair, which begins to lift Anat's spirits. The affair makes Thomas ruminate on his time with Oren, including one of their final trysts, where Oren dismissed the idea of revealing the affair to his wife.

Anat finds a shopping list written in German among Oren's personal effects, including the name of the Berlin cafe where Thomas works. Anat tells Thomas that Oren told her he was having an affair, and planned on leaving her and their son in Jerusalem to start a new life in Berlin. Anat forced him to leave the house, and he died in a car accident on his way to a hotel. Both Anat and Thomas are separately overwhelmed with guilt and grief. Later, Anat discovers that her kosher certification has been revoked, making all the catered goods worthless. While trying to deal with the situation, she discovers a note in Oren's effects with Thomas's handwriting. After rebooting Oren's second phone, she discovers more than a dozen voicemail messages from Thomas, and realizes that he was her husband's lover. Motti forces Thomas to leave Jerusalem immediately, saying they don't want him here and he must never return to Israel.

Three months later, Anat's cafe is successful, despite lacking kosher certification. Anat travels to Berlin, where she spots Thomas coming out of his cafe from a distance. After watching him depart, she looks up at the sky and smiles.

== Cast ==
- Tim Kalkhof as Thomas
- Sarah Adler as Anat
- Zohar Strauss as Motti
- Roi Miller as Oren
- Tamir Ben-Yehuda as Itai

== Production ==
Arranging financing for The Cakemaker took six years. The Jerusalem Film Fund supported the production of the film, but the funding was insufficient. The film was presented in the Berlinale Talents, the Agora Film Market and the Cannes Marche du Film, but received no support. After 19 rejection letters from the film funds, and with only the support of the Jerusalem Film Fund, The Cakemaker was shot on a budget of $90,000 in 20 days, in two countries, Germany and Israel. Following a first cut, the film received additional financing from the Rabinovich Foundation and the Cinelab post production award, which allowed the film to be finished. The Cakemaker was then acquired by the international sales company Films Boutique.

== Release ==
The Cakemaker had its first screening in the market at Cannes for buyers and distributors. It was acquired for distribution in Japan and the United States. The official premiere was in the Karlovy Vary International Film Festival 2017 in the main competition. The Cakemaker was honored by a standing ovation that lasted 10 minutes, and won the Ecumenical Jury Award. A month later in the Jerusalem Film Festival, The Cakemaker won two awards—the Lia Van Leer Award and the Best Editing Award. Subsequently, The Cakemaker participated in numerous film festivals worldwide, winning 11 awards, and is distributed in 22 countries.

In July 2017, Strand Releasing acquired North American rights to The Cakemaker. The film was released in select US cities on 29 June 2018. In April 2018, producer Uri Singer acquired the rights for an American remake of the film.

== Reception ==
On Rotten Tomatoes, the film holds an approval rating of 97% based on 59 reviews, with an average rating of 7.5/10. The site's critics consensus reads, "The Cakemaker explores all-consuming emotion with beguiling restraint, adding up to a delicately understated character study fueled by the power of love."

Kenneth Turan of the Los Angeles Times wrote: "Like a patient baker, filmmaker Grazier sees no reason to rush what happens between Thomas and Anat, and these two become key parts of each other's lives so gradually, the acting and directing are so precisely right, that we believe what transpires."

The New York Times' critic Jeannette Catsoulis wrote: "Sad and sweet, and with a rare lyricism, The Cakemaker believes in a love that neither nationality, sexual orientation nor religious belief can deter. Some may find its reticence off-putting or even irritating, but at heart it's just a tender love triangle with a ghost in the middle."

Godfrey Cheshire from RogerEbert.com refers to the film as "a terrifically impressive feature debut". He wrote: "Watching it, the film's intelligent, well-crafted story and beautifully drawn characters seem to suggest literary roots. But, examine those virtues more closely and it becomes evident that here they're owed to a form of storytelling that's essentially cinematic, one that depends on a quality that distinguishes this film throughout: its extraordinary delicacy and restraint."

Walter Addiego from the San Francisco Chronicle states that "Grazier takes his time and never feels the need to spell everything out, and The Cakemaker is a testament to what filmmakers can achieve when they trust the audience."

In 2018, The Cakemaker won seven Ophir awards by the Israeli Academy of Film and Television. The film also became Israel's official entry to the 2019 Oscars in the Best Foreign Film category, but it was not nominated.

The film has been noted for its exploration of the topic of sexual fluidity.

=== Accolades ===
Award / Film Festival	Year	Category	Recipients and nominees	Result	Ref(s)
Adelaide Film Festival	2017	International Feature Award		Nominated	
Awards of the Israeli Film Academy	2018	Best Film		Won	
Awards of the Israeli Film Academy	2018	Best Director	Ofir Raul Graizer	Won	
Awards of the Israeli Film Academy	2018	Best Actress	Sarah Adler	Won	
Awards of the Israeli Film Academy	2018	Best Screenplay	Ofir Raul Graizer	Won	
Awards of the Israeli Film Academy	2018	Best Editing	Michal Oppenheim	Won	
Awards of the Israeli Film Academy	2018	Best Art Direction	Yael Bibel	Won	
Awards of the Israeli Film Academy	2018	Best Sound	Avi Mizrahi	Won	
Awards of the Israeli Film Academy	2018	Best Cinematography	Omri Aloni	Nominated	
Awards of the Israeli Film Academy	2018	Best Costume Design	Lital Goldfine	Nominated	
Berlin Jewish Film Festival	2018	Gershon Klein Award Best Director	Ofir Raul Graizer	Won	
Berlin Jewish Film Festival	2018	Gershon Klein Award Best Israeli Film		Won	
Chicago International Film Festival	2017	Gold Hugo New Directors Competition	Ofir Raul Graizer	Nominated	
Chicago International Film Festival	2017	Gold Q-Hugo	Ofir Raul Graizer	Nominated	
Festival du cinéma israélien de Carpentras	2018	Best Film		Won	
Festival du Cinéma Israelién de Montréal	2018	Jury Prize	Ofir Raul Graizer	Won	
Florida Film Critics Circle Awards	2018	Best First Film	Ofir Raul Graizer	Nominated	
Hamburg Film Festival	2017	Young Talent Award		Nominated	
International Film Festival & Awards Macao	2017	Best Film		Nominated	
Jerusalem Film Festival	2017	The Lia Van Leer Award	Ofir Raul Graizer	Won	
Jerusalem Film Festival	2017	Haggiag Award Best Editing	Michal Oppenheim	Won	
Jerusalem Film Festival	2017	Haggiag Award Best Israeli Feature		Nominated	
Karlovy Vary International Film Festival	2017	Prize of the Ecumenical Jury		Won	
Karlovy Vary International Film Festival	2017	Crystal Globe		Nominated	
Kosmorama, Trondheim Internasjonale Filmfestival	2018	Audience Award		Won	
London Film Festival	2017	Sutherland Award First Feature Competition	Ofir Raul Graizer	Nominated	
Miami Jewish Film Festival	2018	The Critics Prize		Won	
Molodist International Film Festival	2018	Special Jury Diploma		Won	
Molodist International Film Festival	2018	Best LGBTQ Film		Nominated	
Pride Pictures	2018	Debut Film Award	Ofir Raul Graizer	Won	
Provincetown International Film Festival	2018	John Schlesinger Award	Ofir Raul Graizer	Won	
San Sebastián International Film Festival	2017	Best Film		Nominated	
Satellite Awards	2019	Best Foreign Language Film		Nominated	
Würzburg International Filmweekend	2018	Audience Award		Nominated	

== See also ==
- List of submissions to the 91st Academy Awards for Best Foreign Language Film
- List of Israeli submissions for the Academy Award for Best International Feature Film
