= Mathias Schwerbrock =

Mathias Schwerbrock (born in Cologne, North Rhine-Westphalia, Germany) is a producer, director, writer, and line producer. He is the founder of the film company Film Base Berlin GmbH, which co-produced the internationally acclaimed film Don 2.

Schwerbrock has produced over 30 projects, wrote, directed and served as line producer, executive producer and service producer on several films.

After studies of philosophy and linguistics in Düsseldorf, Mathias started his career in Munich directing commercials and the short films Killing Boxes (Panorama Berlinale) and a medium length film Lumen (Hof). In 1994 he went to Berlin working as a production manager on a number of German feature films with directors Wolfgang Becker, Max Färberböck, Nico Hofmann and Rainer Matsutani before he moved on to line-produce mostly international feature films in China, Israel, US, Canada, Russia and France. After executive-producing the films Nightsongs (Competition Berlinale) and Hamburger Lektionen by Romuald Karmakar he co-produced the Bollywood action-blockbuster Don 2 with Excel Entertainment, Mumbai, directed by Farhan Akhtar featuring Shah Rukh Khan.

In 2011 his company Film Base Berlin service-produced the European shoot of the series The Transporter for Atlantique Films in Paris followed by the South-Korean action-pic The Berlin File directed by Ryoo Seung-wan. In 2013 and 2014, Mathias was line producing the Berlin shoot of DreamWorks' biopic The 5th Estate on Wikileaks founder Julian Assange directed by Bill Condon and Marjane Satrapi's Mandalay Vision production The Voices. In Israel he produced Sharon Rhyba Khan's documentary Recognition and Erez Pery's The Interrogation followed 2016 by Ofir Graizer's The Cakemaker.

In 2021 Mathias has been line-producing the SKY UK Series Then You Run and service-producing the Berlin shoot of the Killing Eve season 4 and has produced the Netflix documentary ELDORADO for the Thursday.Company. In 2023 he is co-producing the documentary After The Evil by Tamara Erde with Gloria-Films in Paris and is developing the feature film A Road Without A Name with Tamara Erde.

During all this time Mathias has been holding lectures at the Film University Potsdam and the Berlin-based Film Academy DFFB, as well as at the Ludwigsburg Academy and the Focal Institution, teaching young Line Producers the skills of producing and international production.

works as a tutor:

- Bertelsmann-Stiftung Cologne, 1999/2000/2001, Budget Controlling in the Production Process
- German Film- and Television Academy Berlin (DFFB), March 2005, Budgeting for Directors
- German Film- and Television Academy Berlin (DFFB), Feb. 2006 Budgeting for Producers
- Focal, Foundation for professional Training in cinema and audiovisual media, Jan 2007 Production Value Workshop, Training of Line Producers & 1st ADs in Geneva, Suisse
- Focal, Foundation for professional Training in cinema and audiovisual media, Jan 2008 Production Value Workshop, Training of Line Producers & 1st ADs in POTSDAM, Germany
- Focal, Foundation for professional Training in cinema and audiovisual media, March 2008 Workshop, Training of Line Producers & 1st ADs in Zurich, Suisse
- ISFF Berlin - Lecture on international Coproductions - Jan 2010
- EPI, Erich Pommer Institute - Lecture on int. Co-Production with Don II Case Study - Dec 2010
- Focal, Feb 2011 Getting Bigger Workshop, Zürich Suisse
- University of Film and Television (HFF) Konrad Wolf in Potsdam-Babelsberg, Jan. 2012 Financing for Producers
- Focal, Foundation for professional Training in cinema and audiovisual media, Jan 2012
- Production Value Workshop, Training of Line Producers & 1st ADs in MALTA
- Focal, Foundation for professional Training in cinema and audiovisual media, Jan 2015
- Production Value Workshop, Training of Line Producers & 1st ADs in Helsinki 2015
- Focal, Foundation for professional Training in cinema, Amsterdam Jan 2016
- Production Value Workshop, Training of Line Producers & 1st ADs in Bilbao Jan 2017
- University of Ludwigsburg, Lectures on International Producing and Budgeting 2018
- Focal - Netflix India Workshop, Training of Line Producers in Mumbai April 2019
- Focal - Amazon India Workshop, Training of Line Producers in Mumbai August 2019
- Production Value Workshop, Training of Line Producers & 1st ADs in Budapest Jan 2020
- University of Ludwigsburg, Lectures on International Producing and Budgeting 2021
- Production Value Workshop, Training of Line Producers & 1st ADs in Lausanne Jan 2022
- University of Ludwigsburg, Lectures on International Producing and Budgeting 2022
- University of Ludwigsburg, ELP - training of executive & Line Producers 2022
- EAVE Participant with the project BIG FEAR as writer in Bergen, Norway
- EKRAN Participant in Warsaw Andrej Wajda School with the Project REAL by Dirk Schäfer

Member of the German Producers Association

Member of the European Film Academy

Member of the Producers Guild America p.g.a.

Member of the groundcontrol.network

== Credits ==
Year	Film	Notes
2025	A Road Without A Name (development)	Producer
2024	After the Evil	Associate producer
2023	Mother Mary	Line producer
2023	Then You Run	Line producer
2023	Bawaal	Service producer
2023	Eldorado, Everything the Nazis hate	Producer
2023	Vikinger	Line producer
2022	Sissi 2	Line producer
2022	Holy Spider	Line producer in prep
2022	Trauma	Producer in development
2021	Love Gets a Room	Service producer
2020	Vater, Sohn und der Preis des Widerstandes	Co-producer in development
2020	Rostocken	Producer in development
2020	Storylines	Service producer
2019	Crews & Gangs	Line producer
2019	And Now Love	Service producer
2019	The Sacrifice	Producer in development
2019	Berlin, I Love You	Line producer
2018	Killing Eve	Service producer
2018	Delphi Rationale	Producer
2017	The Cakemaker	Co-producer
2016	Human Flow by Ai Weiwei	Line producer
2016	The Interrogation	Co-producer
2015	The Man in the High Castle	Service producer
2015	Underground Fragrance	Associate producer
2015	Recognition (Hakara)	Producer
2014	The Voices	Line producer
2013	The Fifth Estate	Line producer
2012	Don 2	Producer
2011	Transporter: The Series	Service producer
2011	The Berlin File	Service producer
2010	Second Honeymoon	Line producer
2009	John Rabe	Line producer
2009	24 Hours Berlin	Line producer
2009	Joanna Trollope	Line producer
2008	For My Father	Line producer
2007	Rudy: The Return of the Racing Pig	Line producer
2006	My friend, the Yeti	Line producer
2006	Hamburger Lektionen	Executive producer
2006	French for Beginners	Production supervisor
2004	Operation Valkyrie	Line producer
2004	Nightsongs, Die Nacht singt ihre Lieder	Executive producer
2004	Wanted!	Line producer
2004	Carola Stern - Doppelleben	Line producer
2003	Zuckerbrot	Line producer
2003	Wolfsburg	Line producer
2002	Berlin Symphony	Line producer
2002	Boran	Line producer
2001	Toter Mann	Line producer
2001	Ende der Saison	Line producer
2001	Zu nah am Feuer	Line producer
2001	My Brother the Vampire	Line producer
2001	Der Schuß	Line producer
2001	Julietta	Line producer
1999	Romantic Fighter	Production manager
1999	Aimee & Jaguar	Production manager
1999	Solo for Clarinet	Production manager
1997	Life is All You Get	Production manager
1996	The Burning Snail	Production manager
1995	Infight	Production manager
1994	Im Osten des Fensters	Production manager
1992	Bildschirmherrschaft	Director
1991	Killing Boxes (short)	Director & writer
1989	Lumen	Director & writer
1989	Verfolgte Wege	Unit manager
1988	Das Sonntagskind	Unit manager
