= Antoni Caimari Caldés =

Spanish filmmaker, sculptor and composer

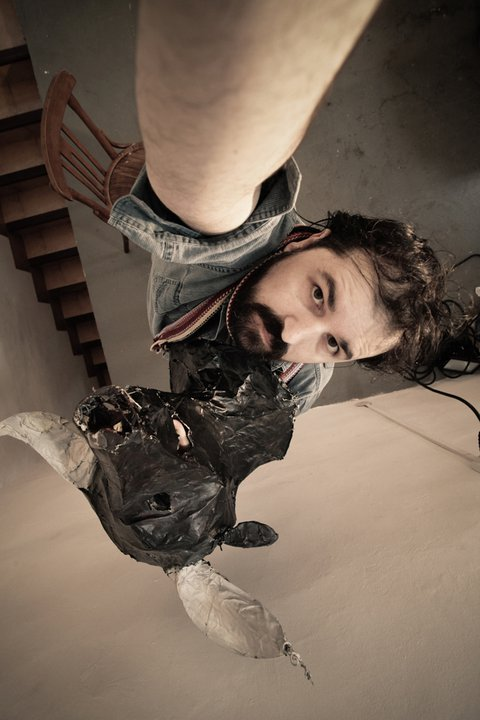

Background information
- Born: December 22, 1976 (age 49); La Puebla, Spain
- Origin: Spanish
- Occupations: Filmmaker, sculptor, photographer, digital artist, composer,
- Website: www.caimari.com

Antoni Caimari Caldés (born December 22, 1976) is a self-taught Spanish filmmaker, sculptor, photographer, digital artist, and composer. He is also an author and actor.

== Career ==
Caimari Caldés began making his first kinetic sculptures in 1987 under the influence of the Swiss sculptor Jean Tinguely. His first exhibition was in 1994 where he donated his first large sculpture The Beast to his hometown of La Puebla, located in the public square "Plaza del Mercado" of his town.

Between 1994 and 2009, Caimari Caldés held various exhibitions showing his work in different disciplines. He is currently dedicated to the production and realization of his own auteur cinema through the help of notable actors and characters from the world of cinema. He is also the creator of the international film festivals, Palma de Mallorca Films Infest and New York City Films Infest.

== Awards ==
Antoni's short film, Ma Belle received several awards at different international film festivals, and in August 2022, he received the Iguana de Oro award for his career as a filmmaker and his contribution to culture at the Ecatepec de Morelos Film and Music Festival.

=== Notable works ===
- 1994 La Bestia La Puebla (sculpture)
- 1997 Hombre Cactus Manacor (sculpture)
- 2007 Gallo Buger (sculpture)

== Filmography ==
=== Short films ===
- 2008 – Ensueño
- 2009 – Autorretrato
- 2010 – Réquiem al amanecer
- 2010 – Carrusel
- 2010 – La Fábrica de Hielo
- 2012 – Memorias de un piano
- 2013 – Das Mädchen der Marionette
- 2015 – Boucle
- 2017 – Ma Belle
- 2021 – Velvet

=== Feature films ===
- 2013 – El cura y el veneno
- 2013 – The Marionette
- 2022 – Walk-In

=== As a producer ===
- 2008 – Esta noche hay que matar a Franco
- 2008 – Retorno
