= Lorna Dewaraja =

Sri Lankan historian (1929–2014)

Lorna Srimathie Dewaraja (1929–2014) was a Sri Lankan historian.

== Biography ==
Dewaraja graduated from the University of Ceylon, followed by postgraduate studies at the University of London. She was a faculty member of the University of Colombo. In 1992, she was awarded a Fulbright Program scholarship to study the history of women in south Asia.

== Publications ==
- Dewaraja, L. S. (1972). A Study of the Political, Administrative, and Social Structure of the Kandyan Kingdom of Ceylon, 1707-1760. Colombo: Lake House Investments.
- --do.-- (1988) The Kandyan Kingdom of Sri Lanka, 1707-1782; 2nd rev. ed. Colombo, Sri Lanka: Lake House Investments ISBN 9555520186
- Dewaraja, L. S. (1981). The Position of Women in Buddhism. Kandy: Buddhist Publication Society.
- Dewaraja, L. S. (2019). The Muslims of Sri Lanka: One thousand years of ethnic harmony, 900-1915.
- --do.-- (1989) Sri Lanka through French Eyes, Sri Lanka: Institute of Fundamental Studies ISBN 9552600030
