= Jorge Clemente (actor) =

Spanish actor

- Born: 24 November 1993 (age 32); Madrid, Spain
- Occupation: Actor
- Years active: 2010-present

Jorge Clemente (born 24 November 1993) is a Spanish actor. He is best known for his performance as Manu in La pecera de Eva and as Carlos "Carlitos" Terán in Seis Hermanas.
