= Lorna Vinden =

Canadian athlete

- Lorna Vinden, from a 1952 newspaper
- Born: Lorna Margaret Skidmore; 1931; Nanaimo, British Columbia
- Died: June 9, 2008 (aged 76–77); Nanaimo, British Columbia
- Other names: Lorna Anderson (after second marriage)
- Known for: Paralympian, wheelchair athlete

Lorna Vinden Anderson (1931 – June 9, 2008), born Lorna Margaret Skidmore, was a Canadian wheelchair athlete, competing in pentathlon, track and field, archery, and swimming events at the 1967 and 1969 Wheelchair Pan American Games, and the 1968 Paralympics in Tel Aviv.

== Early life ==
Lorna Margaret Skidmore was born in Nanaimo, British Columbia, the daughter of Henry Hearst Skidmore and Elizabeth Margaret McDonald Skidmore. Her father was a newspaperman. She was a gymnast as a girl. In 1951, Vinden contracted polio, and survived with paraplegia.

== Career ==
Vinden became a wheelchair athlete in her thirties. She earned eight medals at the Wheelchair Pan American Games in Winnipeg in 1967. She was a member of Canada's national team at the 1969 Wheelchair Pan American Games in Buenos Aires, and at the 1968 Paralympics in Tel Aviv, competing in the pentathlon, track and field, archery, and swimming events. She belonged to the Canadian Wheelchair Sports Association. She described how everyday life was training for her: "If you live in a wheelchair you're pushing and lifting things all day. Even jumping a curb downtown while shopping is an exercise."

Vinden was executive secretary of the Vancouver Island office of the Rehabilitation Foundation of British Columbia. She also worked for the Public Service Commission in Victoria, finding employment for disabled workers. "Whenever I've gone job-hunting for myself, I've first scouted the building to see if I can get into it," she explained of the barriers her clients faced. "Washrooms can prove a real hurdle too." She also volunteered with the Kinsmen Rehabilitation Foundation in Vancouver, and the Lions Club Easter Seal program.

Vinden was a member of the Canadian Paraplegics Association, and served on the board of the Multiple Sclerosis Society.

== Personal life ==
Lorna Skidmore married twice. Her first husband was J. Keith Vinden; they married in August 1950. Her second husband was Ian Anderson, who survived, along with her two sons, Dean and Jay, when she died in 2008, in Nanaimo.
