= Eduardo Casanova =

Spanish actor

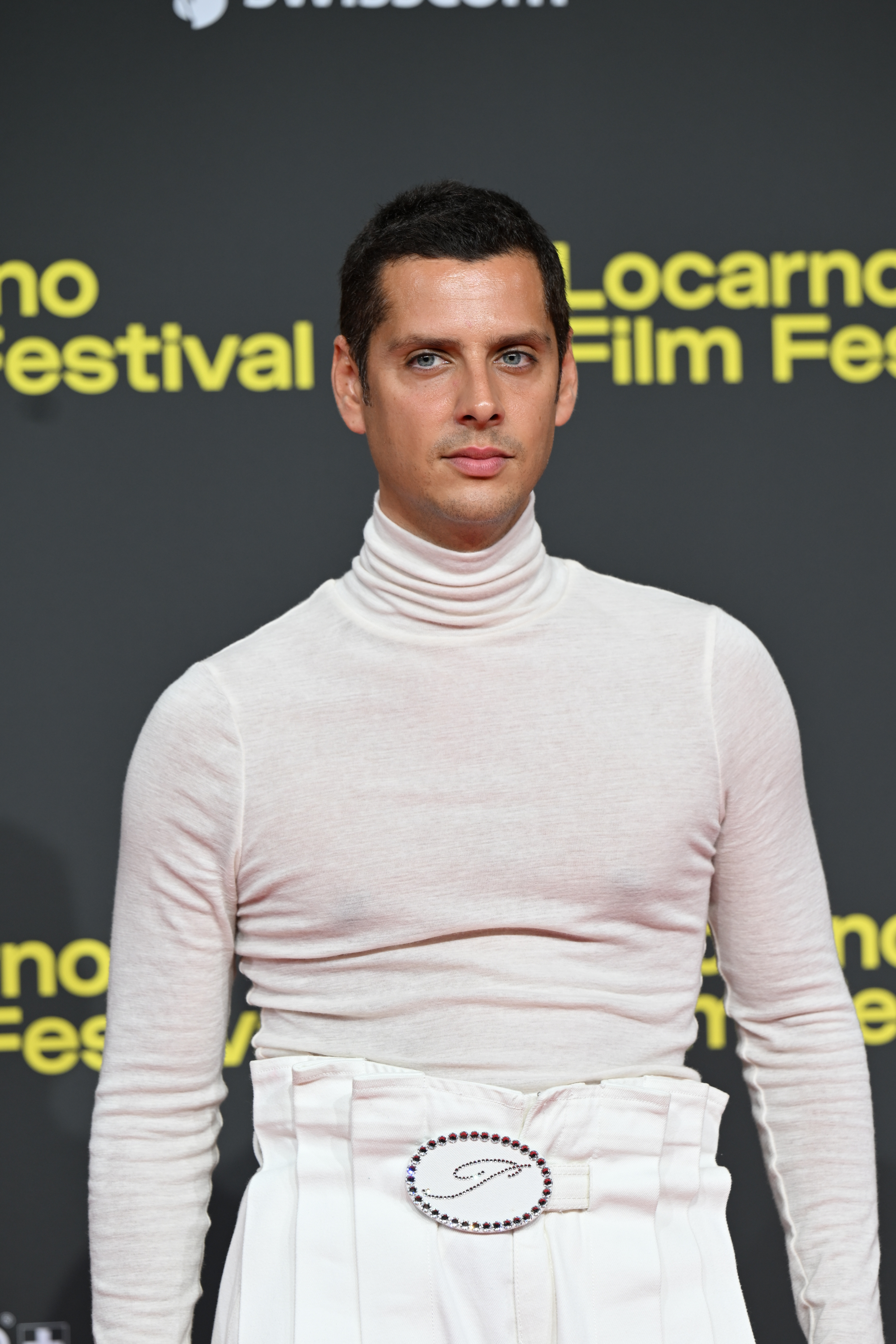
- Casanova in 2025
- Born: Eduardo Reina Valdehita; 24 March 1991 (age 35); Madrid, Spain
- Occupations: Actor; director; screenwriter
- Years active: 2005–present

Eduardo Reina Valdehita (born 24 March 1991), better known as Eduardo Casanova, is a Spanish actor and filmmaker, popularly known for his role as Fidel in the sitcom Aída (2005–2014).

== Life and career ==
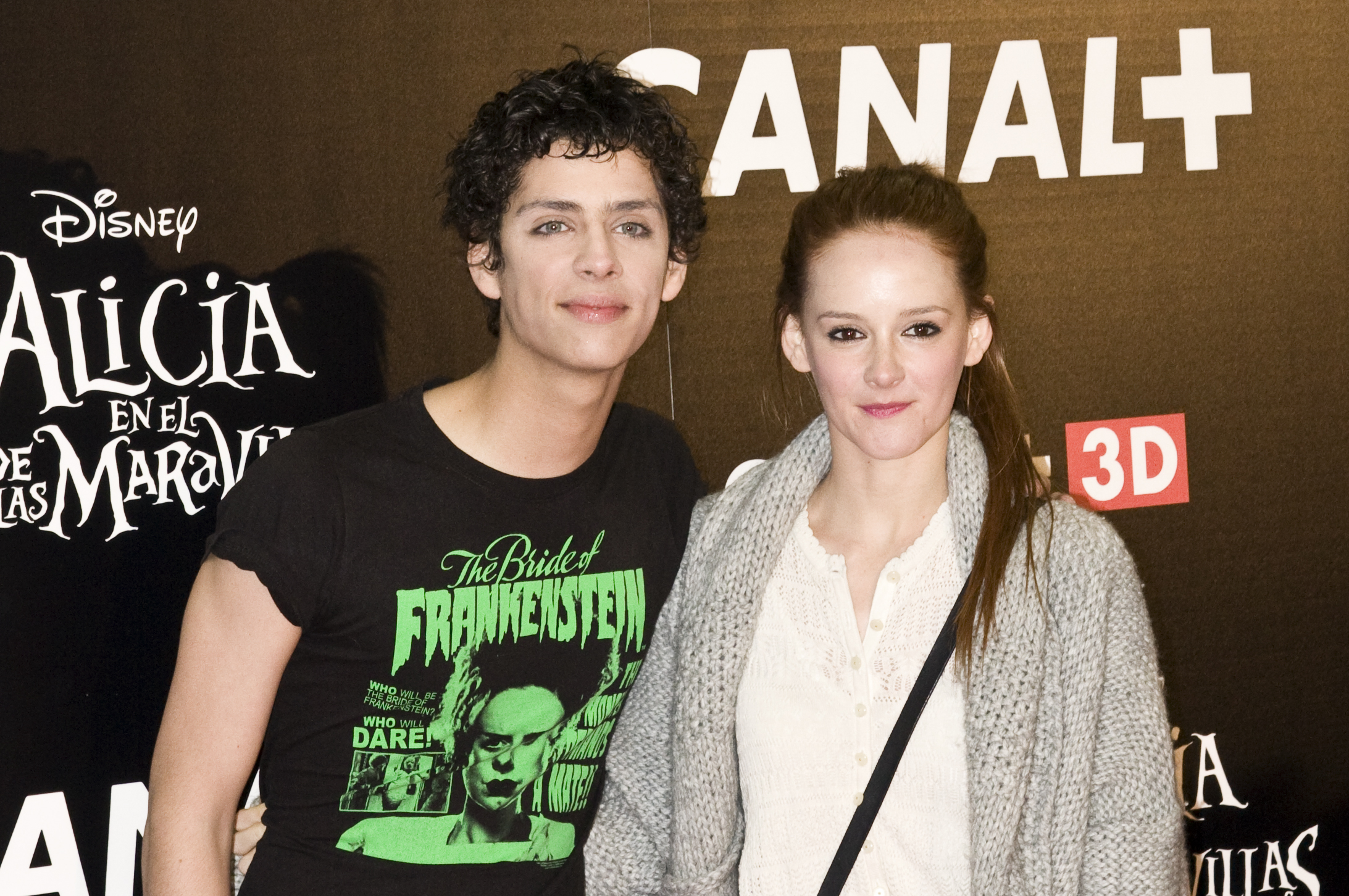
Together with Ana Polvorosa, in 2010.

Eduardo Reina Valdehita was born in Madrid on 24 March 1991. Upon attending his first casting call, he reportedly adopted his grandmother's surname Casanova as his artistic name.

In 2005, age 14, he joined the cast of Aída, aired on Telecinco and which was a spin-off of 7 vidas. Casanova played the role of Fidel, an openly gay teenager (described as the "first gay boy in Spanish TV"), earning him great popularity in Spain. After ten seasons, Aída ended in 2014 and Casanova then advanced his interest on film direction, while also starring in a number of productions. In 2015, he joined the cast of Gym Tony, aired on Cuatro, playing Chencho, a rich customer of the 'Gym Tony'. In 2017, after directing short films, Casanova presented his debut feature film: Skins.

In 2022, he participated in Drag Race España's Season 2 as a guest judge.

His sophomore feature, Piety, premiered at the 2022 Karlovy Vary International Film Festival. His miniseries Silence entered the 2025 Locarno Film Festival. In December 2025, he announced that he had HIV in order to break "this unpleasant and painful silence after so many years".

He played a version of himself in the metafictional comedy film Aida, the Movie (2026) exploring the shooting of an episode of Aída.

== Filmography ==
=== Actor ===
Television

Year	Title	Role	Notes	Ref
2005–2014	Aída	Fidel Martínez		
2015	Gym Tony	Chencho		
2020	Alguien tiene que morir (Someone Has to Die)	Carlos	Miniseries	

Film

Year	Title	Role	Notes	Ref
2011	La chispa de la vida (As Luck Would Have It)	Lorenzo		
2012	Del lado del verano	Tomás		
2017	Señor, dame paciencia (Lord, Give Me Patience)	Carlos		
2023	My Father's Mexican Wedding	Chema		

=== Director ===
Year	Title	Notes	Ref
2017	Pieles (Skins)		
2022	La piedad (Piety)		
