= La Regenta (upcoming film) =

- Directed by: Mar Coll
- Screenplay by: Mar Coll; Anna R. Costa; Diego Vega
- Based on: La regenta by Leopoldo Alas, "Clarín"
- Produced by: María Zamora
- Starring: Ester Expósito; Oriol Pla; Vito Sanz; Borja Luna; Carlos González; Ana Torrent; Itsaso Arana; Gonzalo de Castro; Clara Ingold
- Edited by: Aina Calleja
- Production company: Elastica Films
- Distributed by: Netflix

La Regenta is an upcoming drama film directed by Mar Coll based on the novel La regenta by Leopoldo Alas, Clarín. It stars Ester Expósito in the titular role.

== Plot ==
Ana Ozores is trapped in a comfortable but joyless marriage with Víctor Quintanar in the city of Vetusta, where every move Ana makes is observed, judged and exploited by those around her.

== Cast ==
- Ester Expósito as Ana Ozores, La Regenta
- Oriol Pla as magistral Fermín de Pas
- Vito Sanz as Víctor Quintanar
- Borja Luna as Álvaro Mesía
- Carlos González as Frígilis
- Ana Torrent as Doña Paula
- Itsaso Arana as Visitación
- Gonzalo de Castro as Ripamilán
- Clara Ingold as Petra

== Production ==
An adaptation of Clarín's novel La regenta (published over 1884–85), the screenplay was written by the director Mar Coll alongside Anna R. Costa and Diego Vega. The film is an Netflix original produced by Elastica Films (María Zamora).

The dean of the cathedral chapter of Oviedo stated that Elastica had reached to them to shoot inside the Oviedo Cathedral, but the chapter rejected the proposal due to the anticlerical themes of the novel, which is set in Vetusta, a fictional portrayal of Oviedo. The chapter's decision elicited unease and public scrutiny in the city and on social media. Both the 1974 film and the 1995 television adaptations directed respectively by Gonzalo Suárez and Fernando Méndez-Leite and starring respectively Emma Penella and Aitana Sánchez-Gijón were shot inside the cathedral, prompting Miguel Barrero to wonder whether if the chapter had lost some tolerance over time.

In October 2026, filming was reported to be ongoing, with the originally intended Asturian locations in Oviedo, Mieres, and Langreo being discarded in the wake of the chapter's decision in favour of the Basque Country.

== See also ==
- List of Spanish films of 2027
