= Hugo Diego Garcia =

French and Spanish actor

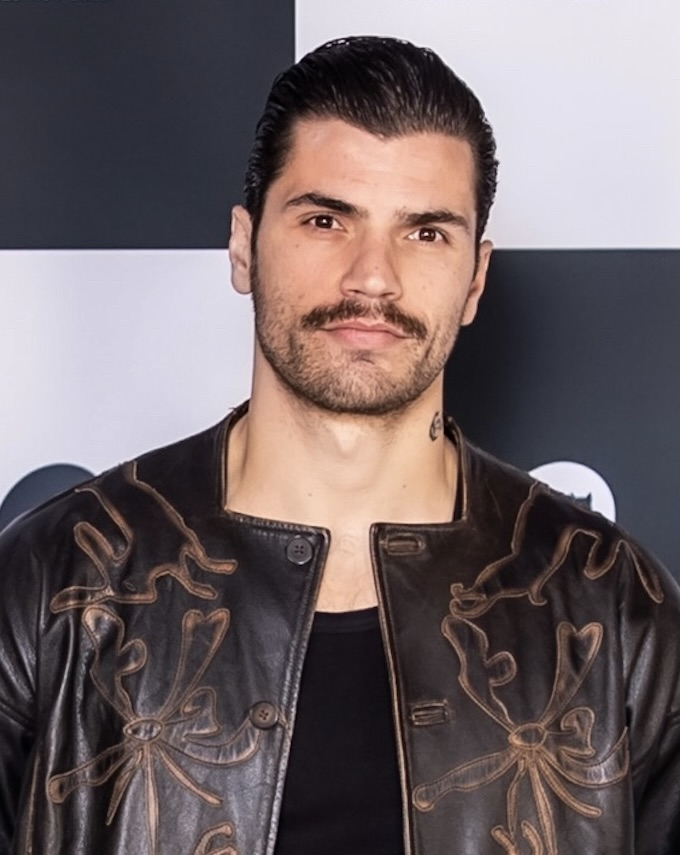
- Garcia at the Tallinn Black Night Film Festival 2025
- Born: August 17, 1993 (age 33); Nantua, France
- Occupations: Actor, writer, director
- Years active: 2018–present
- Notable work: Vache Folle, The Substance, The Killer, Marfil

Hugo Diego Garcia (born 17 August 1993) is a French–Spanish actor, writer and director. His work includes roles in The Substance (2024), The Killer (2024) and the Hulu series Death and Other Details (2024). He co-directed and starred in the independent feature Vache Folle (2025).

== Early life ==
Garcia was born in Nantua. He has described his background as a combination of Spanish Republican heritage, French rural ancestry, and Southern Italian immigration.

Before entering the film industry, he studied law and trained in boxing, later working for several years as a boxing trainer.

He later studied theatre and cinema in Lyon and Paris before moving to Los Angeles. Garcia was selected for the BAFTA Newcomer program as part of its Los Angeles/New York expansion.

== Career ==
Garcia began his career writing, directing, and acting in short films. His early projects included the short films Tony and Cagnolino, both of which he wrote, directed, and appeared in. Tony was listed among UK Film Review's notable short films of 2019.

In 2020, Garcia directed the music video Mauve for his brother MALO.

In 2021, Garcia appeared in the OCS series Les Sentinelles and in Alexandra Lamy's feature film Touchées.

In 2024, he was cast as Jules Toussaint in the Hulu mystery series Death and Other Details, opposite Mandy Patinkin and Violett Beane, directed by Marc Webb. He also appeared in Coralie Fargeat's The Substance, which premiered in Competition at the Cannes Film Festival and later received multiple Academy Award nominations. He also played Coco in John Woo's remake The Killer (2024).

In 2025, Garcia wrote, produced, co-directed and co-edited Vache Folle with Lorenzo Bentivoglio, also starring in the film. Shot mainly in the Jura region, the project was developed and financed independently. The film premiered in the Rebels with a Cause competition at the Tallinn Black Nights Film Festival (PÖFF) and was later selected for the International Competition at the Mar del Plata International Film Festival, where it won the Astor Piazzolla Special Jury Award and the Astor Piazzolla Award for Best Actor for Garcia. Vache Folle also screened at the Saint-Jean-de-Luz International Film Festival and is listed by UniFrance.

Garcia stars opposite Ester Expósito in Amazon Studios’ upcoming two-part Prime Video adaptation of Mercedes Ron's Enfrentados novels, playing the lead character Sebastian Moore in Marfil (2026) and its follow-up Ébano (2027).

== Other work ==
In 2025, Garcia co-founded the production collective Karanta Zero with Lorenzo Bentivoglio, Malo Garcia, and Jordan Evrard.

Garcia was named by Vanity Fair Spain as one of 2025's "21 talents to watch".

== Filmography ==
=== Film ===
Year	Title	Role	Notes
2018	Tony (short)	Tony / Writer–Director–Actor	Short film.
2019	Cagnolino (short)	Dario / writer–director	Short film.
2024	The Substance	Diego / boyfriend	Feature film; premiered in Competition at Cannes.
2024	The Killer (2024 film)	Coco	John Woo film (supporting role).
2025	Vache Folle	Cédric Poncet / Writer, producer, co-director, co-editor	Feature debut (co-directed with Lorenzo Bentivoglio). Premiered at Tallinn PÖFF; Mar del Plata awards (Special Jury Award; Best Actor).
2026	Marfil	Sebastian Moore	Prime Video – first part of the adaptation of Mercedes Ron.
2027	Ébano	Sebastian Moore	Prime Video – second part of the adaptation of Mercedes Ron(announced).

=== Television ===
Year	Title	Role	Notes
2021	Les Sentinelles	guest / supporting	OCS series (French production).
2024	Death and Other Details	Jules Toussaint	Hulu mystery series; premiered January 2024.

=== Music videos ===
Year	Title	Artist	Role	Notes
2024	Mauve	Malo	Director / Appears	Directed the music video for his brother MALO.
