= Cuando los ángeles duermen =

Cuando los ángeles duermen may refer to:

- Cuando los ángeles duermen, the original title of the 1947 Spanish-Italian film When the Angels Sleep
- Cuando los ángeles duermen, the original title of the 2018 Spanish film When Angels Sleep
