= Asia Ortega =

Spanish actress (born 1995)

- Born: Asia Ortega Leiva; 18 May 1995 (age 31); Barcelona, Spain
- Occupation: Actress
- Years active: 2004-present

Asia Ortega Leiva (born 18 May 1995) is a Spanish film and television actress and dancer who became known for her participation in the series The Hockey Girls (2019–2020) as Flor Vilamayor. Later, she starred in the series The Boarding School: Las Cumbres (2021–2022) in the role of Amaia Torres.

== Biography ==
=== First years ===
Ortega Leiva was born on 18 May 1995, in Barcelona, Spain. She is descendant of an Argentinian father, a circus clown by profession, and a Spanish mother and actress. Always rooted in the world of art, she has a great passion for flamenco, so from a very young age she began with this type of dance.

=== Professional career ===
In 2017 she made her film debut with the movie Cuando los ángeles duermen, directed by Gonzalo Bendala and produced by Áralan Films. In 2018 she played Sara, daughter of José Coronado, in the film Tu hijo, directed by Miguel Ángel Vivas and produced by Apache Films. In April 2019 she premiered on TV3 the series Les de l'hoquei, where she played Flor Vilamayor during the two seasons. In addition, she signed for the second season of + de 100 mentiras on Atresmedia's Flooxer platform

In 2020 she participated in the feature film Malnazidos, directed by Alberto de Toro and Javier Ruiz Caldera. She also starred in Hasta el cielo, a film by Daniel Calparsoro, alongside Miguel Herrán and Carolina Yuste. In 2021 she starred in the series El Internado: Las Cumbres, adaptation of the successful Antena 3 El Internado: Laguna Negra, where she played Amaia Torres, a conflictive student looking for her boyfriend. After the broadcast of the first season in February 2021, the renewal of the series for a second season was announced, again with Asia as the main character, along with Albert Salazar. In April 2021 she participated episodically in the Netflix series El Inocente, playing Cassandra.

In February 2022, it was announced that she would star in the TV series Hasta el cielo on Netflix, based on the 2020 film of the same name, in which she already participated in a supporting role.

== Filmography ==
=== Film ===
Year	Title	Character	Directed by
2018	When Angels Sleep	Gloria	Gonzalo Bendala
2018	Your Son	Sara	Miguel Ángel Vivas
2020	Sky High	Sole	Daniel Calparsoro
2021	Malnazidos	Novia Pueblo	Alberto de Toro and Javier Ruiz Caldera

=== Television ===
Year	Title	Character	Channel	Duration
2017	Centro médico	Silvia	TVE	1 episode
2019	Más de 100 mentiras	Carlota	Flooxer	5 episodes
2019–2020	The Hockey Girls	Florencia «Flor» Vilamayor	TV3	26 episodes
2021	The Innocent	Cassandra	Netflix	4 episodes
2021–2023	The Boarding School: Las Cumbres	Amaia Torres	Amazon Prime Video	19 episodes
2022	Hasta el cielo	Sole	Netflix	8 episodes
2026	Fake Profile	Juanita	Netflix	10 episodes
