= John D. Rutherford =

British literary critic

John David Rutherford is a British literary critic who is Emeritus Fellow (2008) of The Queen's College, Oxford, a Hispanist and an award-winning novelist and translator from Spanish to English.

== Studies ==
Rutherford attended The Haberdashers' Aske's Boys' School in North London. He started his Spanish studies at Wadham College before going on to St Antony's College in 1969, although he had already started lecturing at Queen's College the previous year.

He has been Praelector in Spanish, Laming Resident Fellow, and Secretary of the Laming Committee.

Rutherford lectured on medieval, Golden Age and modern Spanish literature, and modern Spanish-American literature. His interests include Galician studies, and the theory and practice of literary translation. He was decorated by King Juan Carlos of Spain for his 2005 translation of Leopoldo Alas (‘Clarín’)'s La Regenta, the first translation into English of the book.

A past president of the International Association of Galician Studies (AEIG) from 1994 to 1997, Rutherford is the Director of the Centre for Galician Studies at the University of Oxford and belongs to the Association of Hispanists of Great Britain and Ireland. He is an honorary member of the Real Academia Galega (Royal Galician Academy).

He was appointed as doctor honoris causa by the Universidade da Coruña (University of A Coruña) in October 2011. The ceremony took place on 23 March 2012 in the city of A Coruña.

== Publications ==
Own publications

- As frechas de ouro (Editorial Galaxia, 2004)
- Breve historia del pícaro preliterario (Universidade de Vigo, 2001)

Translations

- The Ingenious Hidalgo Don Quixote de la Mancha by Miguel de Cervantes Saavedra (Penguin Classics, 2000)
- La Regenta by Leopoldo Alas (Penguin Classics, 2005)

== Awards ==
- Castelao Medal (1998)
- Pedrón de Honra (2003)
- Premio Trasalba (2007)
