= ¡Adiós, Cordera! =

1892 short story written by Leopoldo Alas

- Author: Leopoldo Alas
- Language: Spanish
- Genre: Novel
- Publication date: 1892
- Pages: 221
- OCLC: 17277096

¡Adiós, Cordera! (1892) is a Spanish short story written by Leopoldo Alas (also known as Clarín). Although the author's works are considered examples of realism or naturalism, many consider him a harbinger of modernism. The story is a dystopian work that deals with the rise of industrialization and modernity in Spain.

== Plot ==
The tale centers upon a poor family in rural Spain and the gradual mechanization of their environment. Widower Antón de Chinta and his two young children (Pinín and Rosa) own a cow. The animal, which serves as a representation of the family's deteriorating economic situation, is affectionately called Cordera or lamb, and has become a family pet.

The story begins in a pastoral setting interrupted by a telegraph pole. Soon after, a railway is put through the field, which further ruptures the tranquility of the bucolic countryside and foreshadows the ending of the tale. Eventually the family's economic situation forces the father to sell the cow, which is taken away on the train for slaughter and gives the work its name.

Years later, Pinín is drafted to fight in the war and departs on the same train as the cow, an act that implies his future death. At the same time, it implies that the slaughter of innocents is a result of modernity and the city's expansion into rural areas.
