= Bandidos (TV series) =

- Genre: Heist drama
- Written by: Pablo Tébar; Jesica Aran
- Directed by: Adrian Grünberg; Javier Ruiz Caldera
- Starring: Alfonso Dosal; Ester Expósito; Juan Pablo Medina
- Country of origin: Mexico
- Original languages: Spanish; Mexican Sign Language
- No. of seasons: 2
- No. of episodes: 14

Production
- Executive producers: Adrien Grunberg; Mark Holder; Christine Holder; Andrew J. Wilson
- Producer: Stacy Perskie
- Cinematography: Luis David Sansans; Marc Bellver; Antonio Riestra; Rodrigo Marina
- Editors: Ana Charte Isa; Queralt González; Elena Ruiz
- Camera setup: Multi-camera
- Running time: 41–50 min
- Production companies: Wonder Street; Redrum; Traziende Films

Original release
- Network: Netflix
- Release: March 13, 2024 – present

Bandidos is a Mexican heist drama television series directed by Adrian Grünberg and Javier Ruiz Caldera and written by Pablo Tébar and Jesica Aran. Produced by Wonder Street, Redrum and Traziende Films, and stars Alfonso Dosal, Ester Expósito and Juan Pablo Medina. The series premiered on Netflix on March 13, 2024.

In December 2024, Netflix confirmed that the series had been quietly renewed for a second season, which was released on January 3, 2025.

== Cast ==
- Alfonso Dosal as Miguel Morales
- Ester Expósito as Lilí
- Juan Pablo Medina as Wilson (season 1, season 2 guest)
- Nicolás Furtado as Octavio
- Mabel Cadena as Inés
- Andrés Baida as Ariel
- Andrea Chaparro as Citlali
- Juan Pablo Fuentes as Lucas
- Adrián Ladrón as Burnt Face
- Bruno Bichir as Juan Morales
- Pol Hermoso as Leo (season 2)
- Ximena Lamadrid as Regina (season 2)
- Luis Vegas as Mano (season 2)

== Production ==
In April 2023, The series was announced on Netflix. The principal photography of the series commenced in April 2023. The filming was wrapped up in July 2023. The trailer of the series was released on February 8, 2024. In December 2024, Netflix quietly renewed the series for a second season.

== Episodes ==
| Season | Episodes | Originally released |
|---|---|---|
| 1 | 7 | March 13, 2024 |
| 2 | 7 | January 3, 2025 |

=== Season 1 (2024) ===
| No. overall | No. in season | Title | Original release date |
|---|---|---|---|
| 1 | 1 | "The Map" | March 13, 2024 |
| 2 | 2 | "The Sacred Place" | March 13, 2024 |
| 3 | 3 | "The Stone" | March 13, 2024 |
| 4 | 4 | "The Legend of the Three Keys" | March 13, 2024 |
| 5 | 5 | "The Exchange" | March 13, 2024 |
| 6 | 6 | "The Traitor" | March 13, 2024 |
| 7 | 7 | "The Treasure" | March 13, 2024 |

=== Season 2 (2025) ===
| No. overall | No. in season | Title | Original release date |
|---|---|---|---|
| 8 | 1 | "The Past Comes Calling" | January 3, 2025 |
| 9 | 2 | "Scorpion Rock" | January 3, 2025 |
| 10 | 3 | "Huachicoleros" | January 3, 2025 |
| 11 | 4 | "The Island of the Dead" | January 3, 2025 |
| 12 | 5 | "La Casa De La Luna" | January 3, 2025 |
| 13 | 6 | "The Diamond" | January 3, 2025 |
| 14 | 7 | "The Heist" | January 3, 2025 |

== Reception ==
Melissa Camacho of Common Sense Media rated the series 3 stars out of 5. Joel Keller of Decider reviewed the series.
