= Ximena Lamadrid =

Mexican actress

Ximena Lamadrid (born 5 June 1996 in Cancún, México) is a Mexican actress. She is best known for her role in the Mexican crime-drama Netflix show Who Killed Sara?, in which she portrays Sara Guzmán.

== Biography ==
Lamadrid grew up in Dubai. At the age of nineteen, she moved to the United States to pursue a degree in theater at the New York University Tisch School of the Arts, where she studied for two years.

== Filmography ==
- Truth or Consequences (2017 short) as Lily
- Las Lobitas, Los Angeles (2019 short) as Angel Jean
- Mud and Honey (2019 short) as Delilah
- On the Rocks (2020) as Mandy
- Who Killed Sara? (2021 TV series) as Sara Guzmán
- Dance Dance Dance (short) as Ava
- Bardo, False Chronicle of a Handful of Truths (film) as Camila Gama
- Break (2019 short) as June Tyler
- Bardo, False Chronicle of a Handful of Truths (2022) as Camila
- El colapso (2023 TV Series) as Sabina
- Bandidos (2024–2025 TV series) as Regina
- Firecrackers and Magnolias (2026) as Vera
