= I'll See You in My Dreams (2003 film) =

- Directed by: Miguel Ángel Vivas
- Written by: Filipe Melo; Ivan Vivas; Miguel Ángel Vivas
- Produced by: Paula Diogo; Filipe Melo
- Starring: Adelino Tavares; São José Correia; Sofia Aparício
- Cinematography: Pedro J. Márquez
- Edited by: José Pepe Tito
- Music by: José Sánchez-Sanz; Ivan Vivas
- Release date: July 1, 2003
- Running time: 20 minutes
- Country: Portugal
- Language: Portuguese

I'll See You in My Dreams is a 2003 Portuguese short horror film directed by Miguel Ángel Vivas, written and produced by Filipe Melo.

== Plot ==
The film is set in a small rural town that is haunted by the undead. Only one man seems to be able to stop them, and that is Lúcio, a worker whose wife recently turned into a zombie, forcing him to keep her locked in the basement. In a local tavern he finds a second shot at true love, but this blooming romance is threatened by the situation plaguing the town.

== Cast ==
- Adelino Tavares as Lúcio the Zombie Killer
- São José Correia as Nancy the Tavern Maid
- Sofia Aparício as Ana the Wife of Lúcio
- Manuel João Vieira as Sam the Tavern Customer
- João Didelet as Dário the Tavern Keeper
- Rui Unas as Miguel the Village Priest
- David Almeida as Mini Zombie - the fighter
- Cláudia Jardim as Principal Zombie - the chubby

== Production ==
It was produced by a crew of musicians, filmmakers and actors who call themselves O Pato Profissional Produções. It was hailed as the first Portuguese zombie movie.

== Soundtrack ==
Portuguese metal band Moonspell recorded a song for this movie, also titled "I'll See You in My Dreams," originally written by Isham Jones, with lyrics by Gus Kahn. Upon completion of the movie, the cast and crew volunteered to stay longer, and shoot a promotional music video based on this song.
