= Your Son =

- Spanish theatrical release poster
- Spanish: Tu hijo
- Directed by: Miguel Ángel Vivas
- Written by: Miguel Ángel Vivas; Alberto Marini
- Produced by: Enrique López Lavigne
- Starring: Jose Coronado; Ana Wagener; Asia Ortega; Pol Monen; Ester Expósito
- Cinematography: Pedro J. Márquez
- Edited by: Luis de la Madrid
- Music by: Fernando Vacas
- Production companies: Apache Films; Las Películas del Apache; La Claqueta; Ran Entertainment
- Distributed by: eOne
- Release dates: 20 October 2018 (Seminci); 9 November 2018 (Spain)
- Running time: 103 minutes
- Countries: Spain; France
- Language: Spanish

Your Son (Spanish: Tu hijo) is a 2018 thriller drama film directed by Miguel Ángel Vivas and written by Vivas and Alberto Marini. It stars José Coronado, Ana Wagener, Asia Ortega, Pol Monen and Ester Expósito.

== Plot ==
The plot revolves around Jaime Jiménez, a surgeon who starts to investigate the beating of his teenage son, Marcos, outside a nightclub.

== Cast ==
- José Coronado as Jaime Jiménez
- Ana Wagener as Carmen
- Asia Ortega as Sara
- Pol Monen as Marcos
- Ester Expósito as Andrea
- Marco H. Medina as Pedro
- Gonzalo Hermoso as Albino
- Sergio Castellanos as Raúl
- Luis Bermejo as Manolo
- Ramiro Alonso as Juan
- Paqui Montoya as María José
- Vicente Romero as Alberto
- José Blanco as Salva
- Marta Romero as María
- Sauce Ena as Inspector Moreno

== Release ==
Your Son premiered as the opening film of the 63rd Valladolid International Film Festival (Seminci) on 20 October 2018. It was released theatrically in Spain on 9 November 2018 by eOne. It was released internationally on Netflix on 1 March 2019.

== See also ==
- List of Spanish films of 2018
