= Ester Expósito =

Spanish actress (born 2000)

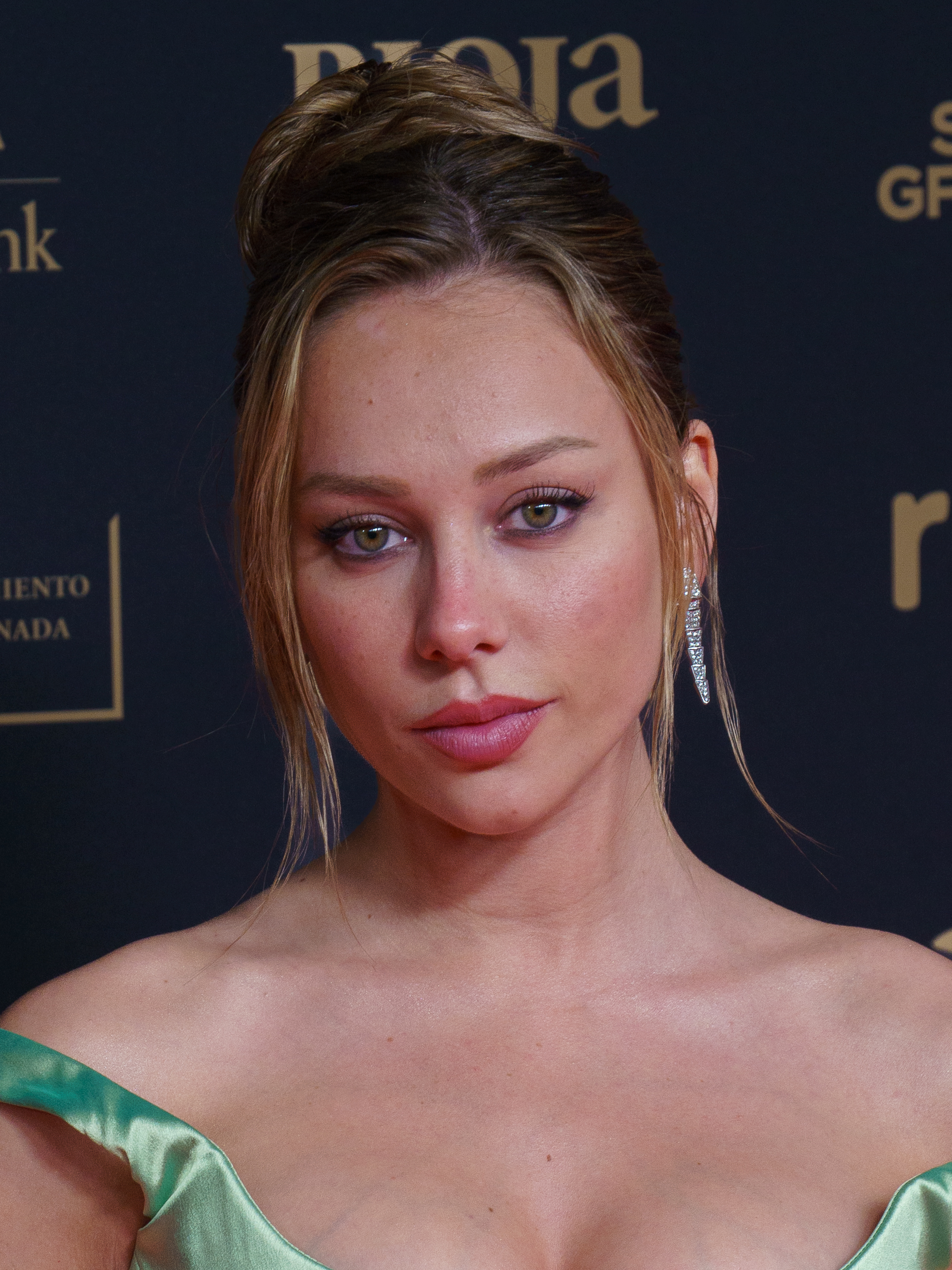
- Expósito in 2025
- Born: Ester Expósito Gayoso; 26 January 2000 (age 26); Madrid, Spain
- Occupation: Actress
- Years active: 2013–present

Ester Expósito Gayoso (born 26 January 2000) is a Spanish actress. She is best known for her starring role as Carla Rosón Caleruega in the Netflix teen drama series Elite (2018–2021). Her other television credits include Estoy vivo (2017), La caza. Monteperdido (2019), Someone Has to Die (2020), and Bandidos (2024–2025).

Expósito's film roles include Your Son (2018), Venus (2022), Lost in the Night (2023), The Wailing (2024), The Talent (2025), and Drawn Together (2026).

== Life and career ==
Ester Expósito Gayoso was born on 26 January 2000 in Madrid. She became interested in the artistic world at a very young age. After completing her studies at the age of 16, she took acting courses. She trained at the Juan Codina acting workshop. Expósito won Best Actress at the Madrid Theater Awards in 2013 and 2015. She landed a minor part in May God Save Us (2016) but she was removed from the final cut of the film. She first appeared on television as Rosa Martín in an episode of the docudrama series Centro Médico in 2016. Later that year, Expósito played Fernando's daughter in a season two episode of Vis a Vis on Antena 3. She reprised her role for a season three episode released in 2018.

Expósito's first recurring television role was as Ruth in the first season of the TVE series Estoy vivo, which aired in 2017. She then gained international attention for her role in the 2018 Netflix teen drama series Élite, in which she portrayed Carla Rosón Caleruega until 2020. After the success of the series, Expósito made her big screen debut with leading roles in the 2018 films When Angels Sleep, as Silvia, and Your Son, as Andrea.

In 2019, Expósito appeared in the TVE series La caza. Monteperdido, where she played Lucía Castán Grau, one of the disappeared girls. She then starred in the 2020 Netflix limited series Someone Has to Die, portraying Cayetana Aldama. Later that year, she had a recurring role in the limited television series, Veneno, on Atresplayer Premium, playing Machús Osinaga, a journalist from the talk show Esta noche cruzamos el Mississippi. In December 2020, she appeared in the role of Claudia in the film You Keep the Kids!, directed by Dani de la Orden, and starring Paco León and Miren Ibarguren. In 2021, Expósito briefly returned to Élite, reprising her role as Carla in three short story episodes.

In 2022, Expósito starred in the horror film Venus in a "very physical" role.

In 2024, Expósito starred in the Mexican heist drama series Bandidos, and signed with talent management firm Brillstein Entertainment.

In 2026, Expósito received the Golden Nymph Award for Most Promising Talent from the Monte-Carlo Television Festival.

== Personal life ==
Expósito was in a relationship with Élite co-star Álvaro Rico from 2018 to 2019. She dated Mexican actor and Someone Has to Die co-star Alejandro Speitzer from late 2019 to June 2021. She later dated Uruguayan actor and Bandidos co-star Nicolás Furtado from 2021 to 2023.

As of 2026, Expósito is in a relationship with French and Real Madrid footballer Kylian Mbappé.

== Filmography ==
=== Film ===
Key
†	Denotes films that have not yet been released

Year	Title	Role	Notes	Ref.
2018	Cuando los ángeles duermen (When Angels Sleep)	Silvia		
2018	Tu hijo (Your Son)	Andrea		
2021	Mamá o papá (You Keep the Kids!)	Claudia		
2022	Venus	Lucía		
2022	Rainbow	Model	Cameo	
2023	Perdidos en la noche (Lost in the Night)	Mónica		
2024	El llanto (The Wailing)	Andrea		
2025	El talento (The Talent)	Elsa		
2026	Dante	Mak		
2026	Enfrentados: Marfil (Drawn Together)	Marfil Cortés		
2026	Baton	TBA		
TBA	La Regenta †	Ana Ozores, "La Regenta"		

=== Television ===
Year	Title	Role	Notes	Ref.
2016	Centro Médico	Rosa Martín	1 episode	
2016; 2018	Vis a Vis (Locked Up)	Fernando's daughter	2 episodes	
2017	Estoy vivo	Ruth	8 episodes	
2018–2020	Élite	Carla Rosón Caleruega	Main cast (season 1-3); 24 episodes	
2019	La caza. Monteperdido	Lucía Castán Grau	7 episodes	
2020	Veneno	Machús Osinaga	2 episodes	
2020	Someone Has to Die	Cayetana Aldama	Main role; 3 episodes	
2021	Élite historias breves: Carla Samuel (Elite Short Stories: Carla Samuel)	Carla Rosón Caleruega	Lead role; 3 episodes	
2024–present	Bandidos	Lilí	Main role; 14 episodes	
