= La regenta (TV series) =

Spanish television miniseries (1995)

- Genre: Drama
- Based on: La regenta by Leopoldo Alas
- Screenplay by: Fernando Méndez-Leite
- Directed by: Fernando Méndez-Leite
- Starring: Aitana Sánchez-Gijón; Héctor Alterio; Juan Luis Galiardo; Carmelo Gómez
- Composer: Bingen Mendizábal
- Country of origin: Spain
- Original language: Spanish
- No. of seasons: 1
- No. of episodes: 3

Production
- Cinematography: Rafael Casenave
- Editor: Nieves Martín
- Running time: 300 min.
- Production company: Televisión Española
- Budget: 500 million ₧

Original release
- Network: La Primera
- Release: 17 January – 19 January 1995

La regenta (transl. The regent's wife) is a 1995 Spanish prime-time television miniseries based on the novel of the same name by Leopoldo Alas. Produced by Televisión Española, it was directed and written by Fernando Méndez-Leite and starred by Aitana Sánchez-Gijón, Héctor Alterio, Juan Luis Galiardo and Carmelo Gómez. Its three episodes were broadcast on La Primera of Televisión Española on 17–19 January 1995.

== Plot ==
The story is set in Vetusta, a fictional provincial capital in northern Spain, where Ana Ozores marries the former prime judge of the city, Víctor Quintanar, a kind but fussy man much older than her. Feeling sentimentally abandoned, she lets herself be courted by the local casanova, Álvaro Mesía. To complete the circle, her confessor and canon in the cathedral of Vetusta, Don Fermín de Pas, also falls in love with her and becomes Mesía's unmentionable rival.

== Production ==
Originally intended as a seven-episodes series of 90 minutes each, Fernando Méndez-Leite successively modified his initial script to fit in three episodes of 100 minutes each following the conditions imposed by Televisión Española. With a budget of 500 million pesetas, filming took place in Madrid and Oviedo under his direction for 84 days between April and July 1994. María Luisa Ponte, who had already played the role of Petronila Rianzares in the 1975 film version directed by Gonzalo Suárez, reprised her role in the miniseries.

== Cast ==
- Aitana Sánchez-Gijón as Ana Ozores
- Héctor Alterio as Víctor Quintanar
- Juan Luis Galiardo as Álvaro Mesía
- Carmelo Gómez as Fermín de Pas
- Amparo Rivelles as Doña Paula
- Miguel Rellán as Tomás Crespo "Frígilis"
- Fiorella Faltoyano as Visitación
- Cristina Marcos as Petra
- María Luisa Ponte as Petronila Rianzares
- Manuel Alexandre as Santos Barinaga

== Episodes ==
The series premiered on 17 January 1995 in prime-time on La Primera of Televisión Española and aired for three consecutive evenings averaging nearly six million viewers.

No.	Title	Original release date	Spain viewers (millions)
1	"Episode 1"	17 January 1995	N/A
2	"Episode 2"	18 January 1995	N/A
3	"Episode 3"	19 January 1995	N/A

== Accolades ==
=== FIPA d'or ===
Year	Category	Recipient	Result	Ref.
1995	Best Actress	Cristina Marcos	Won	

=== Fotogramas de Plata ===
Year	Category	Recipient	Result	Ref.
1995	Best Television Actress	Aitana Sánchez-Gijón	Won	
1995	Best Television Actor	Carmelo Gómez	Won	

=== Actors and Actresses Union Awards ===
Year	Category	Recipient	Result	Ref.
1995	Best Television Lead Performance	Aitana Sánchez-Gijón	Won	
1995	Best Television Supporting Performance	Cristina Marcos	Won	

== Restoration ==
RTVE carried out a digital 4K UHD scanning, remastering and restoration of the series, that was originally recorded on film, and made it available online in RTVE Play and on its Botón Rojo app for 4K Smart TVs in 2020.
