= The Killer (2024 film) =

Film by John Woo

- Release poster
- Directed by: John Woo
- Screenplay by: Brian Helgeland; Josh Campbell; Matt Stuecken
- Based on: The Killer by John Woo
- Produced by: Charles Roven; Alex Gartner; John Woo; Lori Tilkin deFelice
- Starring: Nathalie Emmanuel; Omar Sy; Sam Worthington; Diana Silvers; Eric Cantona; Saïd Taghmaoui
- Cinematography: Mauro Fiore
- Edited by: Zach Staenberg
- Music by: Marco Beltrami
- Production companies: Universal Pictures; A Better Tomorrow Films; Atlas Entertainment
- Distributed by: Peacock
- Release date: August 23, 2024
- Running time: 126 minutes
- Country: United States
- Language: English
- Box office: $318,618

The Killer is a 2024 American action thriller film directed by John Woo, a remake of his 1989 Hong Kong film. The film stars Nathalie Emmanuel, Omar Sy, Sam Worthington, Diana Silvers, Eric Cantona, Tchéky Karyo and Saïd Taghmaoui. It centers on a professional contract killer who refuses to murder a blind woman on the orders of her handler, leading to a confrontation with old colleagues and a determined detective.

An adaptation of The Killer was in development since the 1990s with various screenwriters and directors being involved but did not materialise. Afterwards John H. Lee was announced to direct the adaptation in 2007 with Woo serving as the producer, but not materialize until 2015, when Woo took over the directing duties from Lee owing to the latter's commitments on other projects.

Universal Pictures officially announced the project in 2017 with contributions from Brian Helgeland, Josh Campbell and Matt Stuecken providing the screenplay. The film underwent several casting and screenplay changes, with the main character's role being gender-swapped and Lupita Nyong'o was originally announced to play the lead before being replaced by Emmanuel. Principal photography commenced from May 2023 and concluded by February 2024 despite the month-long hiatus due to the 2023 SAG-AFTRA strike.

The Killer was released in the United States by the streaming service Peacock on August 23, 2024. It received mixed reviews and received numerous nominations at the Taurus World Stunt Awards.

== Plot ==
Zee is a professional assassin living in Paris who is regularly contracted by Finn, an Irishman employed to eliminate crime lord Jules Gobert's rivals in the drug business. The few pleasures her violent lifestyle leaves her include the friendship of an old tailor named Tessier, who provides her with disguises, her pet goldfish, and crossword puzzles. To the underworld, she is infamous as the Queen of the Dead.

Finn contracts Zee to kill a Marseille drug gang partying at a local nightclub where American singer Jenn Clark is performing. During an attempted arrest, police inspector Sey and his partner Jax are forced to kill Jenn's drug-dealing boyfriend "Coco". Sey notes Coco was listening to one of Jenn's songs. The gangsters receive texts that Coco has been killed, and Zee eliminates them all. Jenn hits her head in a fall, causing her to go blind. Zee spares Jenn as an uninvolved civilian, but Finn demands she finish the job by killing her in the hospital. Zee poses as a vice-consul from the US embassy to access Jenn's room and prepare a deadly IV drip. Sey interrupts when he arrives to take her statement. Jenn remembers little and Zee pretends to accidentally knock over the IV, not wanting to betray herself by killing Jenn in front of Sey.

Sey connects Gobert to a recent heroin theft from Arabian prince Majeb Bin Faheem but Sey's superiors fear for their careers as some gangsters are dirty cops working for Gobert. Finn, intending to corner the Paris drug market, is responsible for the theft. Zee arrives to take Jenn to safety before Finn's thugs can assassinate her, and a shootout with Sey erupts. Jenn identifies Zee as the killer and reveals that she and Coco stole Bin Faheem's heroin shipment from its original thieves, setting off the subsequent murders. Zee tells Finn she eliminated Jenn, but Finn later learns the truth. Sey tracks Zee down and interrogates her, learning she was involved in an earlier case of his, saving his life. Zee escapes custody, only to find Jenn has been kidnapped by Finn's men, and learns from Tessier that he informed on her under duress.

Gobert demands Finn have Zee assassinate Bin Faheem, but Finn kills Gobert instead. He then frames Sey, forcing him into hiding, and tasks Zee with eliminating him, promising her and Jenn's freedom. Zee sees Sey meeting Jax and notices a hitman waiting to kill her afterward, realizes she's been set up, kills the assassin, exposes Jax as corrupt, and teams up with Sey to bring Finn down. They retrieve the heroin Jenn stole and arrange an exchange at an abandoned church which turns violent. The drugs are destroyed by Sey's explosives, and Jenn recovers her sight. Zee distracts Finn before he can kill her, allowing Sey to slide her a gun and kill Finn. Jenn reunites with her mother and tells Sey she plans to change her life.

== Cast ==
- Nathalie Emmanuel as Zee
- Omar Sy as Sey
- Sam Worthington as Finn
- Diana Silvers as Jenn Clark
- Saïd Taghmaoui as Prince Majeb Bin Faheem
- Angeles Woo as Chi Mai
- Eric Cantona as Jules Gobert
- Tchéky Karyo as Tessier
- Grégory Montel as Jax
- Hugo Diego Garcia as Coco
- Michaël Erpelding as Serge
- Aurélia Agel as Juliet

== Production ==
In 1992, American filmmaker Walter Hill and David Giler wrote a screenplay for Tri-Star Pictures titled The Killer that was dated 6 April 1992. The press release for this remake stated the script was written for actors Richard Gere and Denzel Washington. In June 1992, it was announced Walter Hill and Giler were writing a script titled Hong Kong based on The Killer with Hill directing. The producers had difficulty with the relationship between the two main characters in the script as they felt that American audiences would interpret it as a homoerotic one. Producer Terence Chang, who worked with Woo on several productions, suggested to the American producers to have Hong Kong actress Michelle Yeoh play the role of the police officer to resolve any homoerotic reading of the film. A year later, screenwriters Jim Cash and Jack Epps, Jr. were hired by producers Charles Roven and Robert Cavallo to write a screenplay based on The Killer for Tristar, writing a third draft of the script dated on 23 August 1993 which featured a story of a Caucasian hitman living in Hong Kong. This screenplay moved the focus from the pairing of the hitman and the police detective characters to the characters of a blinded nightclub singer and the hitman.

In October 2007, The Hollywood Reporter announced that a remake of The Killer was announced with Korean-American director John H. Lee directing. The remake would take place in Los Angeles's Koreatown, Chinatown, and South Central. Lee named The Killer as one of his favorite films and said he was excited to make his own version of the film. Lee's version was set to be produced by Woo, and star Jung Woo-sung and shot in 3D. Seven Stars Film Studios was slated to finance the production with a screenplay by Josh Campbell. Sarah Li was initially cast to play the role of the blind singer. Woo spoke about the remake in October 2015, stating that Lee's film was in development for some time and Lee eventually took on other projects. Woo commented in 2015 that he would return to Hollywood after filming Manhunt (2017) in order to make an American adaptation of The Killer. Universal Pictures was announced to be developing the film with a script written by Eran Creevy based on drafts by Josh Campbell and Matt Stuecken, with additional contributions by Brian Helgeland. Actress Lupita Nyong'o had been cast for the lead role. Woo said that filming would begin in January 2019. About the decision to flip both the gender and race of the lead, Nyong'o remarked that she "did not see it coming, either", stating that she had received, read and liked the script without having seen the original film. However, Woo told Deadline in November 2019 that Nyong'o had left the film due to scheduling conflicts as a result of a script rewrite. In May 2022, it was announced that the film would be directed by Woo, produced by Universal, and released exclusively on Peacock. In August 2022, Universal announced that Omar Sy would lead the film as the cop character. In March 2023, Nathalie Emmanuel was cast in the lead role. Principal photography commenced two months later in Paris, but was halted due to 2023 SAG-AFTRA strike. Filming resumed in November after the strike ended and continued till February 2024.

== Release ==
The film was released on Peacock on August 23, 2024.

== Reception ==
On the review aggregator website Rotten Tomatoes, 59% of 59 critics' reviews are positive, with an average rating of 5.8/10. The website's consensus reads: "John Woo recaptures some of his legendary action bravura in this gallic [sic] reimagining of his very own The Killer, although the kinetic set pieces don't quite compensate for the overall lack of personality." Metacritic, which uses a weighted average, assigned the film a score of 60 out of 100, based on 18 critics, indicating "mixed or average" reviews.

Jesse Hassenger of The Guardian wrote "There’s nothing urgently necessary about a new version of The Killer. It humbly presents the optional but delightful spectacle of watching John Woo have fun again." Bilge Ebiri of Vulture wrote "This new Killer is loaded with action scenes, and they never feel phoned in or generic". David Ehrlich of IndieWire wrote "The Killer doesn’t stray too broadly from the general structure of the original, but it applies such different pressure to each beat that it feels like a very different film." Alton Barnhart of SLUG stated that "The Killer runs a bit long, and it’s certainly nothing particularly new, but it’s a fun guilty pleasure movie" while further adding "If you can turn off your brain and view the movie as what it is, rather than holding it to the same standards as an original than was quite groundbreaking for its time, it’s a lively and diverting ride." Pete Volk of Polygon said that despite the remake did not match the standards set by Woo's 1989 original, he added "Woo uses the bare bones of the narrative and characters to make a new experience, one that feels like a throwback to his dual-wielding, dove-flapping days of yore — but with a fresh new spin on the action". Volk further complimented Emmanuel's performance, particularly in the action sequences, calling that it provided her the chance to become a full-fledged action hero.

Julian Roman of MovieWeb stated that "The Killer will disappoint if compared line by line to one of the greatest action films ever made [...] It's difficult to do, but this film has to be viewed through an objective and dispassionate lens". Jacob Oller of The A.V. Club wrote "The Killer is evidence that action movies are fighting back, wrestling Woo into standardized submission. And yet, you still admire the romantic dedication the director has to filming acts of principled violence. Woo seems to embody his killer’s notion that, though it’s easy to pick up a gun, it’s hard to put it back down." Tara Bennett of Paste added that the remake "certainly scratches a very particular action itch but doesn’t come near besting the original." Brian Tallerico of RogerEbert.com wrote "John Woo movies used to strap you into your seat, making the rest of the world fall away as you appreciated their action artistry. That’s just not the case here."

Siddhant Adlakha of IGN said "John Woo's Paris-set remake of his 1989 Hong Kong classic The Killer not only fails to live up to the original's melodrama and slow-motion excitement, but it also falls flat in a modern action-movie landscape whose most influential John is Wick. It has no soul or style, and creates no sense of chemistry between lead actors Omar Sy and Nathalie Emmanuel. They try their best to fill the movie's dead air with charm and anguish. Unfortunately, their best isn't enough." Jordan Mintzer of The Hollywood Reporter wrote "Woo got the ball rolling back in the late ’80s and early ’90s, but that ball has gotten bigger and faster, more violent and technically competent — to the point that it seems to have rolled past him by now. If his new movie feels 25 years too late, it’s also a reminder of what made the original so special in its day. Those who manage to discover The Killer through this serviceable remake would be better off revisiting the one that started it all." Jake Cole of Slant Magazine wrote "The 1989 movie understood the moral torpor barely hidden behind facades of professional honor, culminating in an agonizing finale that confronted its dubious heroes with the violent ends awaiting their violent lives. The remake, though, cops out, validating Zee’s self-absolving ethical denial with a more hopeful conclusion that, in context, feels dishonest and patronizing."

== Accolades ==
Awards	Date of ceremony	Category	Recipient(s) and nominee(s)	Result	Ref.
ADG Excellence in Production Design Awards	February 15, 2025	Excellence in Production Design for a Television Movie	Romain Rosier (set decorator), Jérôme Billa (set decorator), Jeremie Solomon (graphic designer), Elise Tulli (art director), Muriel Chinal (set decorator), Cyndi Nello (supervising art director), Louise Caron (assistant art director), Gilles Cornu (concept artist), Robin Chichoux (graphic designer), Sébastien de Martel (graphic designer), Benoit Maillochon (concept artist), Nicolas Brisset (art director), Aline Bonetto (production designer), Bertrand Clercq-Roques (senior art director) and Frédéric Bénard (supervising art director)	Nominated	
Golden Trailer Awards	May 29, 2025	Best Action (Trailer/Teaser) for a TV/Streaming Series	"Reloaded"	Nominated	
Golden Trailer Awards	May 29, 2025	Best Action (TV Spot) for a TV/Streaming Series	"Reloaded"	Nominated	
Hollywood Music in Media Awards	November 20, 2024	Original Score – TV/Streamed Movie	Marco Beltrami	Nominated	
International Film Music Critics Association	February 27, 2025	Best Original Score for an Action/Adventure Film	Marco Beltrami	Nominated	
Motion Picture Sound Editors	February 23, 2025	Outstanding Achievement in Sound Editing – Non-Theatrical Feature	Mark P. Stoeckinger (supervising sound editor), Alan Rankin (sound designer), Stephen P. Robinson (sound editor), Sean Massey (dialogue editor), Robin Harlan (foley artist), Sarah Jacobs (foley artist), Gael Nicolas (sound designer), Jack Whittaker (sound editor), Michael Baird (co-supervising sound editor) and Sang Jun Kim (dialogue editor)	Nominated	
Producers Guild of America Awards	February 8, 2025	Outstanding Producer of Streamed or Televised Motion Pictures	Charles Roven, Alex Gartner and John Woo	Nominated	
Taurus World Stunt Awards	September 11, 2025	Best Fight	Aurelia Agel and Jade Dregarious	Nominated	
Taurus World Stunt Awards	September 11, 2025	Best High Work	Jade Dregarious	Nominated	
Taurus World Stunt Awards	September 11, 2025	Best Work with a Vehicle	Rob Hunt, Mike Johnson, Sarah Lezito, Trevor Morgan and Jenny Tinmouth	Nominated	
Taurus World Stunt Awards	September 11, 2025	Best Overall Stunt by a Stunt Woman	Aurelia Agel and Jade Dregarious	Nominated	
Taurus World Stunt Awards	September 11, 2025	Best Stunt Coordinator and/or 2nd Unit Director	Vincent Bouillon, Brett Smrz and Gregg Smrz	Nominated	
