= Reflections (2002 film) =

- Theatrical release poster
- Spanish: Reflejos
- Directed by: Miguel Ángel Vivas
- Screenplay by: Miguel Ángel Vivas
- Starring: Georges Corraface; Ana Fernández; Emilio Gutiérrez Caba; Alberto Jiménez; Carlos Kaniowsky; Magüi Mira; Ana Otero
- Cinematography: Juan Miguel Aspiroz
- Edited by: Pablo Zumárraga
- Music by: Luis Miguel Cobo
- Production companies: Calle Cruzada; Ensueño Films; Vía Interactiva
- Distributed by: Columbia TriStar Films de España
- Release date: 25 January 2002
- Country: Spain
- Language: Spanish

Reflections (Spanish: Reflejos) is a 2002 Spanish neo-noir crime thriller film written and directed by Miguel Ángel Vivas starring Georges Corraface.

== Plot ==
Beleaguered police inspector Jaime Narbona takes over a serial baby killer case with the help of coroner Virginia and colleague Iván, with suspicions initially falling upon Lázaro, who Narbona had already tried to put behind bars in the past.

== Cast ==
- Georges Corraface as inspector Narbona
- Emilio Gutiérrez Caba as Lázaro
- Carlos Kaniowsky as Baena
- Ana Fernández as Julia
- Ana Otero
- Magüi Mira as Virginia
- Alberto Jiménez as Iván
- Héctor Colomé
- Jordi Dauder

== Production ==
The film was produced by Vía Interactiva, Ensueño Films, and Calle Cruzada with the backing of Antena 3 and Vía Digital. It boasted a budget of 450 million Pts.

== Release ==
Distributed by Columbia TriStar, the film was released theatrically on 25 January 2002.

== Reception ==
Casimiro Torreiro of El País wrote that Vivas demonstrates "manners of a filmmaker's with a keen eye", but is eroded by no other than himself "in his facet as a screenwriter".

Jonathan Holland of Variety wrote that the film "succeeds in imitating the visuals of David Fincher but, despite a strong cast, fails to generate either suspense or characterization", with the script being "absurd".

Fernando Méndez-Leite of Fotogramas rated the film 3 out of 5 stars, highlighting "Vivas' making and visual atmosphere" as a positive point while citing Corraface's accent as a negative point.

== See also ==
- List of Spanish films of 2002
