= Sky High (2020 film) =

2020 Spanish film

- Theatrical release poster
- Spanish: Hasta el cielo
- Directed by: Daniel Calparsoro
- Screenplay by: Jorge Guerricaechevarría
- Produced by: Borja Pena
- Starring: Miguel Herrán; Luis Tosar; Carolina Yuste; Patricia Vico; Fernando Cayo; Richard Holmes; Asia Ortega; Ayax Pedrosa; Dollar Selmouni
- Cinematography: Josu Inchaústegui
- Edited by: Antonio Frutos
- Production company: Vaca Films
- Distributed by: Universal Pictures International Spain
- Release dates: 22 August 2020 (Málaga); 18 December 2020 (Spain)
- Running time: 121 minutes
- Country: Spain
- Language: Spanish

Sky High (Spanish: Hasta el cielo) is a 2020 Spanish crime thriller film directed by Daniel Calparsoro from a screenplay by Jorge Guerricaechevarría which stars Miguel Herrán, Luis Tosar, Carolina Yuste, Patricia Vico, Fernando Cayo, Richard Holmes, Asia Ortega, Ayax Pedrosa, and Dollar Selmouni.

== Plot ==
The plot follows the progression in the criminal career of Ángel, a young man from the Madrid suburbs, after he meets Estrella in a club. It depicts misadventures of a gang of petty criminals after the real estate crash.

== Cast ==
- Miguel Herrán as Ángel
- Carolina Yuste as Estrella
- Fernando Cayo as Duque
- Luis Tosar as Rogelio
- Asia Ortega as Sole
- Richard Holmes as Poli
- Patricia Vico as Mercedes
- Ayax Pedrosa as Motos
- Dollar Selmouni as Gitano
- Jarfaiter as Toño
- Ramseys as Nando
- Carlytos Vela as Pintas

== Production ==
Sky High was produced by Vaca Films, with additional participation from RTVE, Movistar+, Telemadrid, Canal+ and Netflix and support from ICAA and Programa Media. The film had a €4 million budget. Universal Pictures International Spain was the distributor of the film. The film was directed by Daniel Calparsoro and the screenplay authored by Jorge Guerricaechevarría.

The eight-week long filming started in September 2019 in Madrid. Shooting locations included Madrid, Valencia and Ibiza.

== Release ==
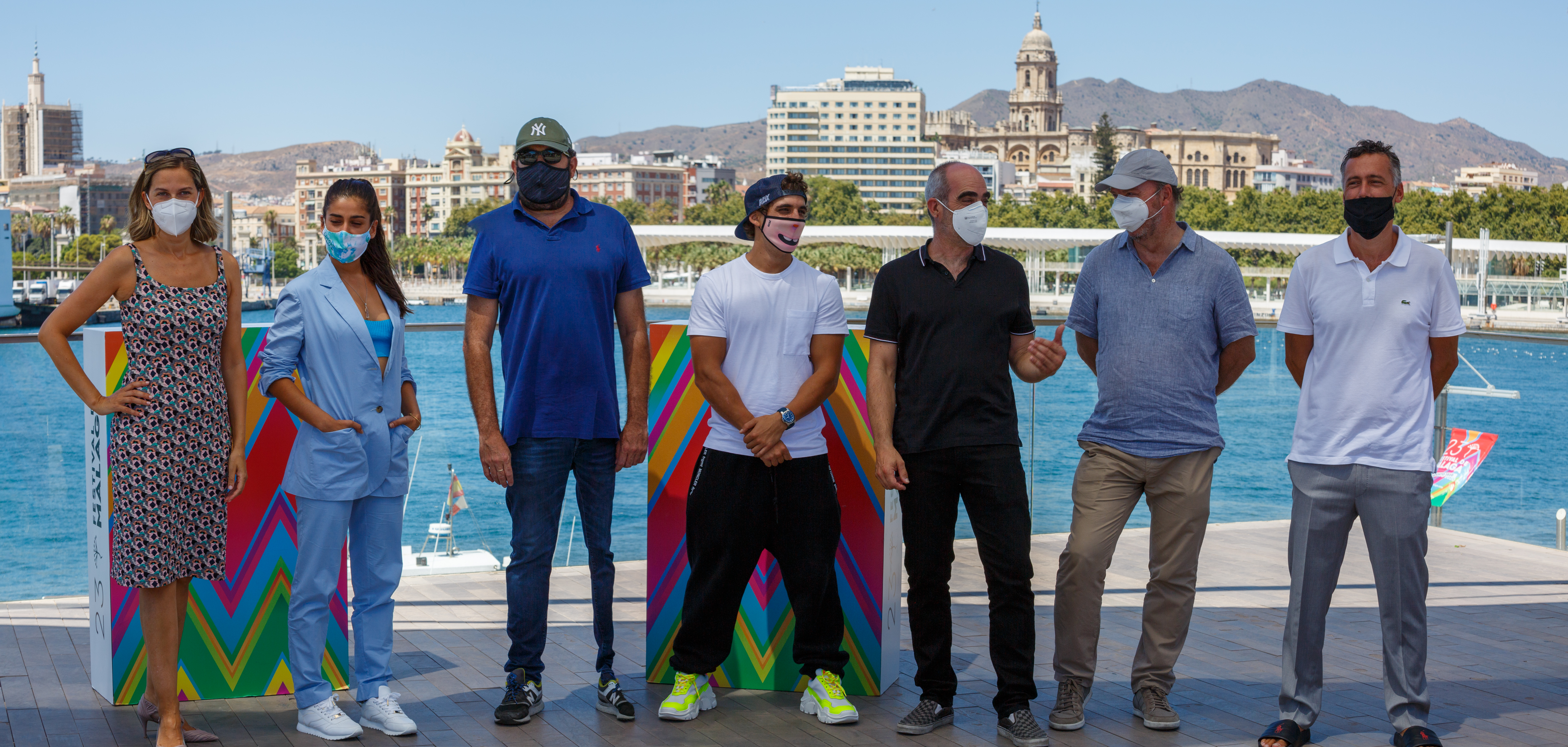
Emma Lustres, Carolina Yuste, Daniel Calparsoro, Miguel Herrán, Luis Tosar and Jorge Guerricaechevarría at the 2020 Málaga Film Festival

The film was presented at the 23rd Málaga Film Festival on 22 August 2020, and theatrically released in Spain on 18 December 2020.

== Sequel ==
In the wake of the acquisition of the film's streaming rights by Netflix, the intention to resume the fiction with an original series was reported. In October 2021, Netflix announced Luis Tosar, Asia Ortega, Álvaro Rico, Alana Porra, Patricia Vico, Ayax Pedrosa, Dollar Selmouni, Richard Holmes and Carmen Sánchez as cast members of the sequel series.

== See also ==
- List of Spanish films of 2020
