= Taurus World Stunt Awards =

Award ceremony

- Awarded for: Excellence in stunt performance
- Location: Los Angeles, California
- Country: United States
- Presented by: Taurus World Stunt Academy
- First award: 2001
- Website: taurusworldstuntawards.com

The Taurus World Stunt Awards is a yearly award ceremony held midyear that honors stunt performers in movies. It is held each year in Los Angeles. The first awards were given out in 2001. The deciding committee has been around since the year 2000. The awards were created by Dietrich Mateschitz, the founder of Red Bull. The awards statue was sculpted by Austrian artist Jos Pirkner, and is a figure in the form of a winged bull.

== Taurus Lifetime Achievement Award ==
- 2001: Hal Needham
- 2002: Buddy Van Horn
- 2003: Terry Leonard
- 2004: Ronnie Rondell Jr.
- 2005: Vic Armstrong
- 2007: Jeannie Epper
- 2010: Jophery Brown
- 2011: Loren Janes
- 2012: Glenn Wilder
- 2013: David R. Ellis
- 2014: Buddy Joe Hooker
- 2015: Gary Combs
- 2016: Andy Armstrong
- 2017: Gene LeBell
- 2018: Charlie Picerni
- 2019: Billy Burton
- 2024: Henry Kingi

== Awards by Year ==
=== 2001 ===
Films in alphabetical order

- The Cell (2000)
  - Best high work
- Charlie's Angels (2000)
  - Best aerial work
  - Best speciality stunt
- Gladiator (2000)
  - Best fight
  - Best work with an animal
- Gone in 60 Seconds (2000)
  - Best driving
- Hollow Man (2000)
  - Best fire
- Me, Myself & Irene (2000)
  - Best work with a vehicle
- Mission: Impossible 2 (2000)
  - Best stunt coordination – feature film
  - Best stunt coordination – sequence
- The Perfect Storm (2000)
  - Best water work

=== 2002 ===
Films in alphabetical order

- Behind Enemy Lines (2001)
  - Best aerial work
- The Fast and the Furious (2001)
  - Best driving
  - Best overall stunt by a stunt man
  - Best overall stunt by a stunt woman
  - Best stunt coordination – feature film
  - Best work with a vehicle
- Jurassic Park III (2001)
  - Best water work
- A Knight's Tale (2001)
  - Hardest hit
  - Best work with an animal
- The Last Castle (2001)
  - Best fire
- Pearl Harbor (2001)
  - Best stunt coordination – sequence
- Rush Hour 2 (2001)
  - Best fight
  - Best high work
  - Best speciality stunt

=== 2003 ===
Films in alphabetical order

- Blade II (2002)
  - Best fight
- The Bourne Identity (2002)
  - Best work with a vehicle
- Die Another Day (2002)
  - Best overall stunt by a stunt woman
- Minority Report (2002)
  - Best high work
- Red Dragon (2002)
  - Best fire
- Windtalkers (2002)
  - Best fire
- XXX (2002)
  - Best overall stunt by a stunt man
  - Best speciality stunt
  - Best stunt coordinator or 2nd unit director
- Wilde Engel (Germany, 2002)
  - Best action in a foreign film

=== 2004 ===
Films in alphabetical order

- Bad Boys II (2003)
  - Best stunt coordinator or 2nd unit director
  - Best work with a vehicle
- The Italian Job (2003)
  - Best speciality stunt
- The Last Samurai (2003)
  - Best fire
- The Matrix Reloaded (2003)
  - Best overall stunt by a stunt woman
- Pirates of the Caribbean: The Curse of the Black Pearl (2003)
  - Best fight
- The Rundown (2003)
  - Best high work
  - Best overall stunt by a stunt man
- Alarm für Cobra 11 – Einsatz für Team 2 (German TV series, 2003–2005)
  - Best action in a foreign film

=== 2005 ===
Films in alphabetical order

- The Bourne Supremacy (2004)
  - Best stunt coordinator or 2nd unit director
  - Best work with a vehicle
- Kill Bill: Volume 2 (2004)
  - Best fight
  - Best overall stunt by a stunt woman
- The Punisher (2004)
  - Best fire
- Spider-Man 2 (2004)
  - Best overall stunt by a stunt man
- Starsky & Hutch (2004)
  - Best high work
- Taxi (2004)
  - Best speciality stunt
- The Clown: Payday (Germany, 2005)
  - Best action in a foreign film

=== 2007 ===
Films in alphabetical order

- Casino Royale (2006)
  - Best high work
  - Best stunt coordinator or 2nd unit director
- Crank (2006)
  - Best speciality stunt
- Letters from Iwo Jima (2006)
  - Best fire
- Pirates of the Caribbean: Dead Man's Chest (2006)
  - Best fight
- Superman Returns (2006)
  - Best overall stunt by a stunt woman
- Talladega Nights: The Ballad of Ricky Bobby (2006)
  - Best work with a vehicle
- You, Me and Dupree (2006)
  - Hardest hit
- Alarm für Cobra 11 – Die Autobahnpolizei (German TV series, since 1996)
  - Best action in a foreign film

=== 2008 ===
Films in alphabetical order

- 300 (2006)
  - Best fight
- American Gangster (2007)
  - Best fire
- The Bourne Ultimatum (2007)
  - Best high work
  - Best work with a vehicle
- Grindhouse (2007)
  - Best overall stunt by a stunt woman
- Hot Rod (2007)
  - Hardest hit
- Live Free or Die Hard (2007)
  - Best stunt coordinator or 2nd unit director
- Seraphim Falls (2006)
  - Best speciality stunt
- Flash Point (Hong Kong, 2007)
  - Best action in a foreign film

=== 2009 ===
Films in alphabetical order

- The Dark Knight (2008)
  - Best fight
  - Best high work
  - Best speciality stunt
  - Best stunt coordinator or 2nd unit director
  - Best work with a vehicle
- Iron Man (2008)
  - Best fire
  - Hardest hit
- Wanted (2008)
  - Best overall stunt by a stunt woman
- Alarm für Cobra 11 – Die Autobahnpolizei (German TV series, since 1996)
  - Best action in a foreign film

=== 2010 ===
Films in alphabetical order

- Fast & Furious (2009)
  - Best stunt coordinator or 2nd unit director
  - Best work with a vehicle
- I Love You, Beth Cooper (2009)
  - Hardest hit
- Ninja Assassin (2009)
  - Best fight
- Obsessed (2009)
  - Best overall stunt by a stunt woman
- Push (2009)
  - Best high work
- Sherlock Holmes (2009)
  - Best fire
- Terminator Salvation (2009)
  - Best speciality stunt
- Interceptor (Russia, 2009)
  - Best action in a foreign film

=== 2011 ===
Films in alphabetical order

- The A-Team (2010)
  - Hardest hit
- Date Night (2010)
  - Best work with a vehicle
- The Expendables (2010)
  - Best fire
- Inception (2010)
  - Best fight
  - Best stunt coordinator or 2nd unit director
- Predators (2010)
  - Best high work
  - Best speciality stunt
- Salt (2010)
  - Best overall stunt by a stunt woman
- Alarm für Cobra 11 – Die Autobahnpolizei (German TV series, since 1996)
  - Best action in a foreign film

=== 2012 ===
Films in alphabetical order

- Fast Five (2011)
  - Best fight
  - Best high work
  - Best stunt coordinator or 2nd unit director
  - Best work with a vehicle
- Fright Night (2011)
  - Best fire
- Mission: Impossible – Ghost Protocol (2011)
  - Hardest hit
- Thor (2011)
  - Best overall stunt by a stunt woman
- Transformers: Dark of the Moon (2011)
  - Best speciality stunt
- Alarm für Cobra 11 – Die Autobahnpolizei (German TV series, since 1996)
  - Best action in a foreign film

=== 2013 ===
Films in alphabetical order

- The Avengers (2012)
  - Best fight
  - Hardest hit
  - Best high work
  - Best overall stunt by a stunt woman
- The Dark Knight Rises (2012)
  - Best speciality stunt
  - Best stunt rigging
- Skyfall (2012)
  - Best stunt coordinator or 2nd unit director
  - Best work with a vehicle
- Alarm für Cobra 11 – Die Autobahnpolizei (German TV series, since 1996)
  - Best action in a foreign film

=== 2014 ===
Films in alphabetical order

- Fast & Furious 6 (2013)
  - Best fight
  - Best stunt coordinator or 2nd unit director
- A Good Day to Die Hard (2013)
  - Best work with a vehicle
- Identity Thief (2013)
  - Best overall stunt by a stunt woman
- Iron Man 3 (2013)
  - Best high work
  - Best speciality stunt
  - Best stunt rigging
- Lone Survivor (2013)
  - Hardest hit
- Stalingrad (Russia, 2013)
  - Best action in a foreign film

=== 2015 ===
Films in alphabetical order

- 22 Jump Street (2014)
  - Best high work
- Captain America: The Winter Soldier (2014)
  - Hardest hit
  - Best stunt coordinator or 2nd unit director
  - Best stunt rigging
- Fury (2014)
  - Best speciality stunt
- John Wick (2014)
  - Best fight
- Need for Speed (2014)
  - Best work with a vehicle
- X-Men: Days of Future Past (2014)
  - Best overall stunt by a stunt woman
- Alarm für Cobra 11 – Die Autobahnpolizei (German TV series, since 1996)
  - Best action in a foreign film

=== 2016 ===
Films in alphabetical order

- Furious 7 (2015)
  - Best overall stunt by a stunt woman
  - Best work with a vehicle
- Jupiter Ascending (2015)
  - Best high work
- Kingsman: The Secret Service (2014)
  - Best fight
- Mad Max: Fury Road (2015)
  - Best speciality stunt
  - Best stunt coordinator or 2nd unit director
  - Best stunt rigging
- Mission: Impossible – Rogue Nation (2015)
  - Hardest hit
- The Medal (Russian TV miniseries, 2015/16)
  - Best action in a foreign film

=== 2017 ===
Films in alphabetical order

- Captain America: Civil War (2016)
  - Hardest hit
  - Best high work
  - Best overall stunt by a stunt woman
  - Best stunt rigging
- Jason Bourne (2016)
  - Best work with a vehicle
- Hacksaw Ridge (2016)
  - Best fight
  - Best speciality stunt
  - Best stunt coordinator or 2nd unit director
- Alarm für Cobra 11 – Die Autobahnpolizei (German TV series, since 1996)
  - Best action in a foreign film

=== 2018 ===
Films in alphabetical order

- Atomic Blonde (2017)
  - Best fight
  - Best high work
- Baby Driver (2017)
  - Best work with a vehicle
- Dunkirk (2017)
  - Best speciality stunt
- Kidnap (2017)
  - Hardest hit
- Pirates of the Caribbean: Dead Men Tell No Tales (2017)
  - Best stunt rigging
- Wonder Woman (2017)
  - Best overall stunt by a stunt woman
  - Best stunt coordinator or 2nd unit director
- Wolf Warrior 2 (China, 2017)
  - Best action in a foreign film

=== 2019 ===
Films in alphabetical order

- Ant-Man and the Wasp (2018)
  - Best fight
- Aquaman (2018)
  - Best overall stunt by a stunt woman
- Black Panther (2018)
  - Best high work
- Deadpool 2 (2018)
  - Best speciality stunt
  - Hardest hit
- Mission: Impossible – Fallout (2018)
  - Best stunt rigging
  - Best stunt coordinator or 2nd unit director
- Venom (2018)
  - Best work with a vehicle
- Taxi 5 (France, 2017)
  - Best action in a foreign film

=== 2020 ===
Films in alphabetical order

- 6 Underground (2019)
  - Best stunt rigging
- Ford v Ferrari (2019)
  - Best work with a vehicle
- John Wick: Chapter 3 – Parabellum (2019)
  - Best stunt coordinator or 2nd unit director
- Joker (2019)
  - Hardest hit
- Once Upon a Time in Hollywood (2019)
  - Best fight
  - Best high work
  - Best speciality stunt
  - Best overall stunt by a stunt woman
- Tomiris (2019)
  - Best action in a foreign film

=== 2021 ===
The winners are listed first and highlighted in boldface.

**Best Fight**: **Extraction – Dan Carter, Vonzell Carter, Travis Gomez, Bobby Holland Hanton, and Anthony Nanakornpanom**; Birds of Prey – Sala Baker, Qiang Li, Renae Moneymaker, Bryan Sloyer, and Caleb Spillyards; The Hunt – Caitlin Dechelle and Sarah Irwin	**Best High Work**: **Tenet – Daniel Graham and Kyle McLean**; Extraction – Dan Carter and Bobby Holland Hanton; Extraction – Bobby Holland Hanton
**Best Stunt Rigging**: **Wonder Woman 1984 – Daryl Andrews, Norbert Phillips, Nooroa Poa, and Joseph Ross**; Bad Boys for Life – Zac Henry, David Hugghins, Michael Hugghins, Ralf Koch, and Billy Morts; Tenet – Chris Daniels, Anthony Genova, Zac Henry, Jacob Hugghins, and Eddie Yansick	**Best Work with a Vehicle**: **Bad Boys for Life – Wyatt Carnel, Jeff Groff, Logan Holladay, Jalil Jay Lynch, and Stan Lee Rice**; Bad Boys for Life – Chick Bernhard, Mike Johnson, Richard Marrero, and James C. Wallace II; Birds of Prey – Jocelyn Kay, Oakley Lehman, Renae Moneymaker, Dena Sodano, and Webster Whinery Jr.; Charm City Kings – Chino Braxton, Mike Burke, Lakeyria Doughty, Roy Farfel, and Jalil Jay Lynch; Extraction – Laurence Chavez, Henry Kingi Jr., Karl Van Moorsel, Brett Praed, and Brett Smrz
**Best Speciality Stunt**: **Birds of Prey – Jocelyn Kay, Oakley Lehman, Renae Moneymaker, Dena Sodano, and Webster Whinery Jr.**; Becky – Heath Hensley; The Call of the Wild – Hannah Betts, Callie Croughwell, and Alice Ford; Project Power – Tim Soergel	**Best Overall Stunt by a Stunt Woman**: **Birds of Prey – Jocelyn Kay, Renae Moneymaker, and Dena Sodano**; Birds of Prey – Renae Moneymaker; The Call of the Wild – Hannah Betts, Callie Croughwell, and Alice Ford; The Stand In – Luci Romberg; Wonder Woman 1984 – Jessie Graff
**Hardest Hit**: **Extraction – Dan Carter and Bobby Holland Hanton**; Birds of Prey – Sam Hargrave; Birds of Prey – Renae Moneymaker; Extraction – Anthony Nanakornpanom	**Best Stunt Coordinator and/or 2nd Unit Director**: **Extraction – Thayr Harris and Daniel Stevens**; Bad Boys for Life – Andy Gill, Jack Gill, Mike Gunther, Spiro Razatos, and Kyle Woods; Birds of Prey – Andy Gill, Jack Gill, Mike Gunther, Spiro Razatos, and Kyle Woods; The Old Guard – Brycen Counts, Jeff Habberstad, and Adam Kirley; Wonder Woman 1984 – Dan Bradley and Rob Inch

=== 2022 ===
The winners are listed first and highlighted in boldface.

**Best Fight**: **The King's Man – Andy Lister, Troy Kentchington, Cali Nelle, Lasha Mdzinarashvilli, and Tom Hatt**; Black Widow – Cc ice, Mickey Facchinello, Micheala McAllister, and Lucy Murray; The Last Duel – Eduardo Gago and John Macdonald; Nobody – Tyler Witte, Kirk Jenkins, Daniel Bernhardt, Alain Moussi, and Stephane Julien; The Suicide Squad – Ingrid Kleinig Stunt, Chris Patton, Harlan Norris, Liam Gherlenda, and Shahaub Roudbari	**Best High Work**: **No Time to Die – David Grant**; Black Widow – Robert Mancino, Sara Curtis, Andy Farrington, Eric Salas, Jef Provenzano, Steve Curtis, Florian Robin, Luke Aikins, and Jef Habberstadt; F9 – Spencer Thomas, Ian Williamson, and Troy Robinson; The Matrix Resurrections – Ella Rogers and Duke Conrad; Those Who Wish Me Dead – Travis Fienhage, Jon Devore, and Mike Swanson
**Best Stunt Rigging**: **The Matrix Resurrections – Scott Fisher, Kyle Weishaar, Bryant Burnett, Brett Praed, and Scott Rogers**; No Time to Die – Grant Wiesenger, Scott Hillier, Johnny Waugh, Voytek Modrzewski, and Ilko Iliev; Shang-Chi and the Legend of the Ten Rings – Paul Doyle, Mark Wickham, Sebastian Dickins, Alex Jewson, and Cameron Ambridge; Venom: Let There Be Carnage	**Best Work with a Vehicle**: **No Time to Die – Evangelos Grecos, Mark Higgins, Martin Ivanov, Cristian Knight, and Pascal Lavanchy**; F9 – Hank King, Denney Pierce, Jalil Lynch, and Jimmy Roberts; The Suicide Squad – Karl Van Moorsel, Mark Tearle, Clay Cullen, Brett Smrz, and Keith Adams
**Best Speciality Stunt**: **No Time to Die – Paul Edmondson**; Demigod – Tim Bell and Elena Sanchez; The Matrix Resurrections – Cliff Flemming, Craig Hoskins, and Rick Shuster; The Suicide Squad – Adam Hart, Harlan Norris, Ingrid Kleinig, and Nathaniel Perry; Those Who Wish Me Dead – Travis Fienhage, Jon Devore, and Mike Swanson	**Best Overall Stunt by a Stunt Woman**: **No Time to Die – Chelsea Mather, Christina Petrou, and Charlotte Williams**; Demigod – Elena Sanchez; Mortal Kombat – Zia Kelly; The Suicide Squad – Ingrid Kleinig
**Hardest Hit**: **Black Widow – Lucy Jayne Murray**; F9 – Denney Pierce; Hitman's Wife's Bodyguard – Jonny James; Mortal Kombat	**Best Stunt Coordinator and/or 2nd Unit Director**: **No Time to Die – Lee Morrison and Olivier Schneider**; Black Widow – Darrin Prescott and Rob Inch; F9 – Andy Gill, JJ Perry, Steve Griffin, Spiro Razatos, and Troy Robinson; Mortal Kombat – Kyle Gardiner and Jade Amantea; Nobody – Dan Skene and Greg Rementer; The Suicide Squad – Guy Norris, Tim Wong, and Karl Van Moorsel
**Best Action in a Foreign Film**: **Raging Fire (Hong Kong) – Kenji Tanigaki**; Freaks Out (Italy); Minnal Murali (India); Rurouni Kenshin: The Final (Japan); The Trip (Norway)

=== 2023 ===
The winners are listed first and highlighted in boldface.

**Best Fight**: **Day Shift** – Lee Chesley, Michael Lehr, Reuben Maldonado, Kyle McLean, Travis Parker; The Gray Man – Nicola Bosc, John Nania; Everything Everywhere All at Once – Naryana Cabral, Chelsey Goldsmith, Craig Henningsen, Andy Le, Brian Le; The Legend of Maula Jatt – Dacio Caballero, Alex Sie; Khuda Haafiz: Chapter 2 – Agni Pariksha- Yannick Ben, Yann Brouet, Guillaume Jean Louis, Anis Messabis, Nicolas Pauget	**Best High Work**: **The Man From Toronto** – Jayson Dumenigo, Samuel J. Paul, Phillip Silvera, James Stewart, Mich Todovoric; Fall – Tai Devore, Jennifer Poe, Chip Powell, Miya Tsudome; The Unbearable Weight of Massive Talent – Mate Gyongyossi, Andras Seregi; Hex – Hannah Betts, Mike Carpenter; Day Shift – Aaron Matthews, Travis Parker
**Best Stunt Rigging**: **The Batman** – Ian Batey, Jacob De Witt, Jared De Witt, Richard Kent, Richard Mead; Uncharted – Keir Beck, Jason Brown, Scott Fisher, Roman Neso Laumpaa, Uli Richter; The Man From Toronto – Jayson Dumenigo, Tim Garris, Urs Inauen, Mariusz Kubicki, Philip Silvera; The Adam Project – Nick Brandon, Marc-Andre Brisebois, Andre Dominguez, JC Robaina, Charles Shults; Black Panther: Wakanda Forever – Sean Cristopher, Richard Epper, Zac Henry, Dave Hugghins, Michael Hugghins	**Best Work with a Vehicle**: **The Batman** – Lloyd Bass, Rick English, Mark Higgins, Rob Hunt, Lee Millham; The Gray Man – Nicolas Bosc, Debbie Evans, Henry Kingi Sr., Denny Pierce, Mike Ryan; Day Shift – Tony Carbajal, Jef Groff, Michael Johnson, Henry Kingi Jr., Cody Mackie; Lost Bullet 2 – Jean Benoit Guillon, Vladimir Houbart, David Julienne, Pascal Lavanchy, Christophe Marsaud; Enola Holmes 2 – Wilf Bowman, Chris DeClerk, Jake Cox, Leah Hill, Tony Lucken
**Best Speciality Stunt**: **All Quiet on the Western Front** – Pavel Bousek, Josef Jelinek, Jan Loukota, Kamil Sghaier, Marek Svitek; Hex – Hannah Betts, Mike Carpenter; Firestarter – Matt Birman, Rene Bishop, Jamie Jones, Billy Oliver, Darryl Scheeler; Fall – Tai Devore, Jennifer Poe, Chip Powell, Miya Tsudome; The Batman – Tom Cotton, Sarah Lezito	**Best Overall Stunt by a Stunt Woman**: **Day Shift** – Shai Debroux; The Adam Project – Zandara Kennedy; The 355 – Katy Bullock; The Gray Man – Debbie Evans; The Batman – Sarah Lezito
**Hardest Hit**: **Father Stu** – JJ Dashnaw; Buba – Martin Goeres, Patrick Richter, Ronny Wechselberger; Day Shift – Marvin Ross; Babylon – Troy Castaneda, Chris Reid; Nope – Logan Holladay	**Best Stunt Coordinator and/or 2nd Unit Director**: **Day Shift** – Troy Robinson, Justin Yu; The Gray Man – Jack Gill, Spiro Razatos; Avatar: The Way of Water – Steve Brown, Stuart Thorp, Garrett Warren; The Batman – Robert Alonzo, Jake De Witt, Steve Griffin, Samuel Le; Everything Everywhere All at Once – Timothy Eulich; All Quiet on the Western Front – Jakub Bobuski, Pavel Bousek, Josef Jelinek, Jan Loukota, Marek Svitek

=== 2024 ===
The winners are listed first and highlighted in boldface.

**Best Fight**: **Extraction 2** -Matthew LaBorde, Jordan Le Goueff, Rachel McDermott; Fast X – Aurélia Agel, Estelle Darnault; John Wick Chapter 4 – Vincent Bouillon, Bruce Concepcion, John Nania, Anthony Oh, Daiki Suzuki; Dungeons & Dragons: Honor Among Thieves – Adam Behan, Iliyan Emanuilov, Mickey Facchinello, Stiliyan Mavrov, Vasil Simeonov; Extraction 2- Travis Gomez, Bobby Holland Hanton, Adam Lytle, Sunny Sun Nuo, Nathaniel Perry	**Best High Work**: **Heart of Stone** – Hannah Betts, Karen Lewis, Craig O’Brien; John Wick Chapter 4 – Vincent Bouillon; Murder Mystery 2 – Sebastien Fouassier, John Medalin, JJ Perry, Kelly Phelan, Pat Romano; The Family Plan – Reef Graham; Meg 2: The Trench – Sofian Francis, Elliot Hawkes, Mark Stanton- Kelly
**Best Stunt Rigging**: **Peter Pan & Wendy** – Perry Beckham, Luke Cormier, Corbin Fox, Dar Hicks, Jason Kruk; Extraction 2 – Kai Hirvonen, Jindrich Klaus, Paul Leonard, Eric Salas, Martin Williams; Shazam! Fury of the Gods – Alli Paige Beckman, Brandon Beckman, Randy Beckman, Chad Bowman, Zach Rogers; Shazam! Fury of the Gods – Alli Paige Beckman, Brandon Beckman, Randy Beckman, Chad Bowman, Jimmy Hart; Blue Beetle – John Dixon, Jacob Hugghins, Michael Hugghins, Ralf Koch, Matthew Murray	**Best Work with a Vehicle**: **Extraction 2** – Ele Bardha, Jindrich Klaus, Martin Semerád, Ivo Vuchkov, Tyler Witte; Extraction 2 – Fred North; Jawan – Joe Buccaro, Tad Griffith, Chester Tripp, Jay Lynch, Arttu Stenburg; The Outlaws – Keith Adams, Richard Burden, Brent Fletcher, Logan Holladay, Crystal Hooks; Transformers: Rise of the Beasts – Tim Rigby, Mike Ryan, Brett Smrz, Brennan Walstrom, Jimmy Wilkey
**Best Speciality Stunt**: **Indiana Jones and the Dial of Destiny** – Jacob Cox, Martin Ivanov, Allistair Whitton; Renfield – Spencer Mulligan, Mike Yahn; Fast X – Arttu Stenburg; Heart of Stone – Hannah Betts, Karen Lewis, Craig O’Brien; Extraction 2 – Markylee Campbell, RJ Casey, Matthew LaBorde, Jordan Le Goueff, Craig “Chili” Palmer	**Best Overall Stunt by a Stunt Woman**: **Heart of Stone** – Hannah Betts, Karen Lewis; Fast X – Debbie Evans-Levitt; Heart of Stone – Nellie Burroughes; Extraction 2 – Magdalena Sittova; Sick – Whitney Coleman
**Hardest Hit**: **John Wick Chapter 4** – Vincent Bouillon; Extraction 2 – Luke Davis; John Wick Chapter 4 – Florian Beaumont, Vincent Bouillon; Guardians of the Galaxy Vol. 3 – Kirk Jenkins; Extraction 2 – Jordan Le Goueff, Magdalena Sittova	**Best Stunt Coordinator and/or 2nd Unit Director**: **Extraction 2** – Shane Habberstad, Thayr Harris, Noon Orsatti, Nathaniel Perry, Stanimir Stamatov; John Wick Chapter 4 – Laurent Demianoff, Stephen Dunlevy, Koji Kawamoto, Jeremy Marinas, Scott Rogers; Indiana Jones and the Dial of Destiny – Dan Bradley, Benjamin Cooke, Mike Massa; Fast X – Andy Gill, Jack Gill, Spiro Razatos, Olivier Schneider, Troy Robinson; Jawan – Anl Arasu, Yannick Ben, Denney Pierce, Spiro Razatos, Sunil Rodrigues

=== 2025 ===
The winners are listed first and highlighted in boldface.

**Best Fight**: **Deadpool & Wolverine** – Alex Kyshkovych, Andy Lister, Daniel Stevens, Liang Yang; The Beekeeper – Tom Connelly, Yoko Hamamura, Steve Jehu, Anthony Oh, Nicolas Wang; Mayhem – Prapassorn Achabbakhe, Apisit Pato, Charlie Ruedpokanon, Manop Vanasinsatrapron, Winai Wiangyangkung; The Killer – Aurelia Agel, Jade Dregarious; Twilight of the Warriors: Walled In- Bi Haiquan, Mitsuki Honda, Li Qing, Kazuma Sakai, Haruki Yoshida	**Best High Work**: **The Fall Guy** – Troy Brown; Dune: Part Two – Ferenc Berecz, Gergely Horpacsi, Miklós Szentváry-Lukács; The Union – Chase Armitage, Chris Livett, Lauren Okadigbo; The Killer – Jade Dregarious; Venom: The Last Dance – Belle Williams, George Kirby, Luke Tumber, Steve Mullins, Steve Jehu
**Best Stunt Rigging**: **Furiosa: A Mad Max Saga** – James Finnis, Noorroa Poa, Michael Roughan, Michael Saliba, Brock Thornburgh; Dune: Part Two – Dave Judge, Diz Sharpe, Paul Mcsevney, Ross Upton; Venom: The Last Dance – Nick Brandon, JC Robaina, Ginger McCarthy, Guy McDonald, Beau Weston; Red One – Arturo “Joey” Dickey, Rockey Dickey, Keone Kim, Josh Seifert, Todd Warren; Wicked – Dary Andrews, Byron Colbert, Krystof Hansbury, Travis Paterson, Joe Spilhaus	**Best Work with a Vehicle**: **The Fall Guy** – Logan Holladay; Beverly Hills Cop: Axel F – Mike Gunther, Fred North, McKinly Wilder; The Killer – Rob Hunt, Mike Johnson, Sarah Lezito, Trevor Morgan, Jenny Tinmouth; The Fall Guy – Logan Holladay; The Killer's Game – Adrian Guggemos, Jack Field
**Best Speciality Stunt**: **Beverly Hills Cop: Axel F** – Fred North, McKinly Wilder, Rex Reddick; The Fall Guy – Logan Holladay; The Fall Guy – Troy Brown; The Fall Guy – Ben Jenkin; The Killer's Game – Robbert de Groot, Jack Field, Adrian Guggemos, Joey van Rijthoven	**Best Overall Stunt by a Stunt Woman**: **The First Omen** – Lucy Johnson; The Beekeeper – Kyla Hymas; Smile 2 – Chelsea Mahr, Erin Clyne; The Killer – Aurelia Agel, Jade Dregarious; Strange Darling – Brooke Coleman
**Hardest Hit**: **The Killer's Game** – Harry Makanga; The Beekeeper – Elliot Cooper; Maxxxine – Brett Sheerin; The Fall Guy – Ben Jenkin; Twisters – Ronan Hice	**Best Stunt Coordinator and/or 2nd Unit Director**: **The Fall Guy** – Keir Beck, Chris O’Hara; Bad Boys Ride or Die – Kirk Jenkins, Kyle McLean, Greg Rementer, Todd Warren; The Killer – Vincent Bouillon, Brett Smrz, Gregg Smrz; Furiosa: A Mad Max Saga – Mark Tearle, Guy Norris, Harlan Norris, Karl Van Moorsel, Tim Wong; The Killer's Game – Domonkos Pardanyi, Troy Robinson, Justin Yu

== In pop culture ==
In the 2007 videogame Stuntman: Ignition, a player can be nominated for the Taurus World Stunt Awards.

== TV airings ==
The award ceremony is normally broadcast on American television channels such as Entertainment News (E!). The awards show has also aired on AMC.

== Other awards ==
In 2008, the Screen Actors Guild (SAG) Awards added two categories for stunt performers in feature films and in television.

Stunt performers have lobbied for the creation of an Academy Award for stunt work, but little progress has been made until 2025. The Academy of Motion Picture Arts and Science has announced on 10 April 2025, that they have established the Achievement Award for Stunt Design. It will be awarded the first time at the 100th Academy Awards 2028 for films released in 2027.
