= Drawn Together (film) =

- Spanish: Enfrentados: Marfil
- Directed by: Óscar Pedraza
- Screenplay by: Sofía Cuenca
- Based on: Marfil by Mercedes Ron
- Produced by: Álex de la Iglesia; Carolina Bang
- Starring: Ester Expósito; Hugo Diego Garcia
- Cinematography: David Acereto
- Production company: Pokeepsie Films
- Distributed by: Amazon Prime Video
- Release date: 9 September 2026
- Country: Spain
- Language: Spanish

Drawn Together (Spanish: Enfrentados: Marfil) is a 2026 Spanish romantic thriller film directed by Óscar Pedraza adapting the first part of the duology Enfrentados by Mercedes Ron. It stars Ester Expósito and Hugo Diego Garcia.

== Plot ==
The plot follows Marfil Cortés, the New York City-based scion of a rich Spanish businessman. After she is kidnapped, her father hires Sebastián Moore as a bodyguard to watch Marfil, eliciting a strong mutual attraction while they deal with multiple threats back in Spain.

== Cast ==
- Ester Expósito as Marfil Cortés
- Hugo Diego Garcia as Sebastián Moore
- Eric Masip as Iván
- Pablo Molinero as Alejandro
- Zoe Bonafonte as Gabriela
- Lluís Homar as Logan
- Joaquín Ferreira as Ray

== Production ==
The film is a Pokeepsie Films (Banijay Iberia) production, with Álex de la Iglesia and Carolina Bang serving as producers. It was shot simultaneously with its follow-up Ébano. Filming locations included Madrid and New York City. Cinematographer David Acereto shot the film with an Arri Alexa 35 camera, Arri Zeiss Master Anamorphic lenses and a Scorpio Zoom 138-405mm.

== Release ==
Drawn Together was released on Amazon Prime Video on 9 September 2026.

== See also ==
- List of Spanish films of 2026
