= The Hockey Girls =

2019 Catalan-language television series

- Genre: Sports drama
- Created by: Laura Azemar Sánchez; Natàlia Boadas Prats; Marta Vivet; Ona Anglada Pujol
- Directed by: Patrícia Font; Kiko Ruiz Claverol; Marta Pahissa
- Music by: Alfred Tapscott
- Country of origin: Spain
- Original language: Catalan
- No. of seasons: 2
- No. of episodes: 26

Production
- Executive producers: Raimon Masllorens; Conxa Orea; Oriol Sala-Patau
- Running time: 50 min.
- Production company: Brutal Media

Original release
- Network: TV3
- Release: April 29, 2019

The Hockey Girls (Catalan: Les de l'hoquei) is a 2019 Catalan-language TV series produced by Brutal Media and TV3, which is the official Catalan channel. It was premiered on April 29, 2019. It was, initially, a final degree project of 4 students who studied "Comunicació Audiovisual" (translated as: "audiovisual communication") at the Universitat Pompeu Fabra: Laura Azemar, Ona Anglada, Natàlia Boadas i Marta Vivet. They presented the project to Pitching Audiovisual of the Audiovisual Cluster of Catalonia, whose main goal is to connect and create a network with all the elements and institutions of the audiovisual area. It aroused interest from different Catalan production companies, among which was found Brutal Media, which finally shaped the project. It is about a girls’ roller hockey team and a community of people involved with hockey.

The series was awarded with the equality prize of CIMA in the FesTVal. CIMA is an association set up by women which expects to encourage the presence of women in the audiovisual media.

It was added to the Netflix catalogue in September 2019.

== Synopsis ==
When Germán, coach of the Club Patí Minerva women's hockey team, decides to leave them in order to train the rival team called "Olímpic", the club president (Enric Ricou) decides that the best solution is to get rid of the team because of economic problems and because he does not believe in female sport. The team players, who are Berta, Emma, Laila, Lorena, Raquel and Flor and who are in high school, struggle to save the women's team in their club while they try to find their place inside and outside the team.

At the same time, Anna Ricou, who is Emma's sister and who had won the Spanish and European Championships during her experience in the club, returns home from Lisbon to recover from an injury and get away with the darkest episode of her sportive career: she caused the coma of one of her teammates after a fight. Finally, Anna gets involved with the girls’ team and she's asked to coach them.

== Themes ==
Many important themes and storylines are addressed in the series. There are stories around women's rights, women's agency, pregnancy, abortion, sex, family relationships, ADHD, corruption, body image, team spirit, racism, teamwork, responsibility, sexuality, and coming of age.

== Cast ==
The main characters are:

- Iria del Río as Anna Ricou Mas.
- Natàlia Barrientos as Berta Figuera Terrats.
- Dèlia Brufau as Emma Ricou Mas.
- Yasmina Drissi as Laila Bakri.
- Mireia Oriol as Lorena Sánchez Ballart.
- Júlia Gibert as Raquel Alcober Monforte.
- Asia Ortega as Florencia 'Flor' Vilamayor.
- Laia Fontàn as Janina Díaz.
- Clàudia Riera as Gina Camps.

The other characters are:

- David Selvas i Jansana as Toni Alcober Marín.
- Nil Cardoner i Gratacós as Òscar Sánchez Ballart.
- Nora Navas Garcia as Júlia Terrats Herraiz
- David Solans as Ricard Planes Rius.
- Xúlio Abonjo Escudero as "el Pela".
- Mireia Aixalà i Rosselló as Sílvia Ballart Monteserín.
- Guillermo Lasheras i Tebar as Quim Puigdevall Centelles or called «Putxi».
- Marc Clotet i Fresquet as Germán Ruestes Hernández.
- Juli Fàbregas i Elías as Santi Ricou Prats.
- Pablo Hernández as Nil Ricou Montagut.
- Gemma Brió i Zamora as Olga Terrats Herraiz.
- Hamid Krim as Youssef Bakri.
- Josep Linuesa i Guerrera as Enric Ricou Prats
- Jan Mediavilla as Bernat.
- Aida Oset as Montse Pagès Cuesta
- Guim Puig i Mas as Lluc Ferrer Raventós.
- Àgata Roca i Maragall as Núria Mas Pujol.
- Romina Cocca as Paulina Vilamayor Astudillo.
- Ivana Miño as Susanna Monforte.
- Arnau Casanovas as Jordi Garriga Lozano.

== Characters ==
- Anna: she has been playing professional hockey in Lisbon when an injury sends her home. As if the injury wasn't enough trouble, she left one of her teammates in a coma after an argument in the locker room. That problem haunts her both mentally and legally. She will become the coach of the women's team. She is competitive, intelligent, independent and honest.
- Berta: she is the captain of Minerva's Female Team. She wants to be a doctor. Her mother is in a mental hospital so she lives with her aunt Terrats.
- Emma: she can be a problem. She is only 16 and very emotional. She's interested in music. When her dad and mom go to Budapest to work, she's left with Anna, who can't control her very well. She was adopted when she was very young and, although both her parents and sister have never treated her differently, she now finds it hard to find her place in the family. She is Laila's best friend.
- Laila: she is of Moroccan descent. Her dad Youssef takes the family to Morocco each summer. She is a shy, nervous, introverted girl. Laila doesn't do well at school and wants to drop out to be an artist. She loves manga, drawing and skateboarding.
- Lorena: is a free spirited lesbian and she is a cheerful and optimistic girl. Her father is a rock musician who doesn't live with them. She aspires to be as free as he is. She has a brother called Oscar on the boys' hockey team. Her mom, Silvia, is in a romance with Enric.
- Raquel: is the goalie and the goalkeeper of Minerva's female team. She has one problem at home that we don't learn about until season 2: she is the daughter of some publicists who spoil her a lot, but they don't pay much attention to her. She has a big argument in her episode about being ready for sex. At first, her boyfriend is Oscar.
- Flor: she is from Argentina. She's the power player on the team or one of the best players. She is strong, solitary, romantic and competitive. She has a girlfriend back home. When that falls apart she looks closer to where she's living now for a little romance.
- Gina: she is a genius with social media and helps the team gather fans and prove themselves to Enric. She's a figure skater, but joins the hockey team midway through the season. She's crazy about Lorena. Lorena is crazy about Gina, too, but Lorena isn't very good at monogamy.
- Oscar: Lorena's brother who also plays hockey.
- Germán: he's moving on to take over a better team for more money. Anna and Germán were together in the past, and their feelings linger. But he's now living with Montse, his partner, who is also a lawyer.
- Enric Ricou: he is the person who runs the sports center. Enric hates the girls’ hockey team and doesn't want them around. The girls have to fight him every inch of the way just to play. Also, he is Anna's and Emma's uncle.
- Terrats: a physical therapist who will help Anna with her injury. She's also a coach at the Sports Center and Anna's boss there.
- Youssef: Laila's father. He runs the bar where everyone hangs out and where much of the action takes place.

== Episodes ==
Season	Episodes	Original release	
Season	Episodes	Start	End
1	13	April 29, 2019	July 22, 2019
2	13	March 30, 2020	June 22, 2020

=== First Season ===
Num. global	Num. Season	Title	Release date	TV3 audience
1	1	"Emma"	April 29, 2019	459.000 (15,6%)
Emma, Laila, Raquel, Flor, Lorena and Berta strive to ensure that the women's section of Club Patí Minerva doesn't disappear, against Enric's ambition, who only supports the men's section. At the same time, Anna returns home with an injury, and finds her adopted sister Emma who doesn't seem to be happy to see her.
2	2	"Anna"	May 6, 2019	324.000 (12,3%)
Anna starts to coach the women's team, trying to imitate Terrats' style without too much success, while hiding a serious secret about what happened in Lisbon. Emma does her utmost so that Santi and Núria don't force her to go with them to Budapest and leave the team and her life in the village.
3	3	"Berta"	May 13, 2019	323.000 (12,5%)
Berta doesn't know how to face her possible pregnancy. Anna and Germán are left alone after an institute reunion dinner. In the meantime, the team agrees to contact a famous youtuber, so that she comes to see them and echoes their team in the Net, something that Enric doesn't like at all.
4	4	"Lorena"	May 20, 2019	286.000 (10,7%)
Lorena discovers that her mother has an affair with Enric and decides to go and live for a while with her father in the farmhouse. Anna begins to apply a new training method, more personal and unique, which has good results. When the girls complain to the boys because they always have the best training schedule, the boys and the girls decide to play it on the rink, and sneak into the pavilion without Enric knowing it.
5	5	"Raquel"	May 27, 2019	287.000 (11,2%)
Raquel feels strange with Òscar after what happened and avoids him. Santi returns to the village, iexcited about a new personal project that nobody quite understands. The girls get to win a match and celebrate it but with such bad luck that the party in the pavilion ends badly. Terrats and Youssef blackmail Enric to support the girls' team.
6	6	"Flor"	June 3, 2019	356.000 (13,4%)
Seeing her relationship in jeopardy, Flor decides to go into hiding to Buenos Aires after an important game to celebrate her anniversary with Valen. Terrats now trains the girls with a strong hand as she prepares them to face their Olympic rivals. Anna feels more and more in the well and more alone, to the point of reaching the limit.
7	7	"Gina"	June 10, 2019	300.000 (11,8%)
Anna tries to remedy what happened by seeing a psychologist, to whom she explains the truth. Santi asks Núria for a favor for Terrats, a fact that tenses their relationship. In the meantime, the team has to look for a new player and Gina appears as the only solution. Gina's anguish for being at the level will put the team in danger and also her relationship with Lorena.
8	8	"Laila"	June 17, 2019	245.000 (9,8%)
Laila and Nil's relationship is progressing, but Laila has problems at school and her parents make her decide whether or not to take medication for ADHD. Enric prepares an institutional video about the club that makes him look good in the face of the elections for president and wants to use the girls, but the Hockey girls and Terrats will face him.
9	9	"Anna i Germán"	June 24, 2019	267.000 (10,8%)
Anna and Germán end up spending time together and remember the old days. On the other hand, Terrats wants Anna to be part of her team for her candidacy as president, but this will make Anna confess what she did in Lisbon. At the same time, the boys have a meal in the Pela's farmhouse without him, which ends up with trouble.
10	10	"Juntes" (together)	July 1, 2019	241.000 (10,2%)
The girls end up abandoning a match to support Lorena. Lorena decides to go against the tide and, with the help of her friends, does what she thinks is right. Sílvia breaks away from Enric and focuses on her family and close friends.
11	11	"Amigues" (friends)	July 8, 2019	207.000 (8,1%)
Emma investigates her past with Laila's help. At the same time, Laila and Nil have a special night thanks to Emma. Anna's Lisbon case becomes more complicated, despite Montse's help, when an unexpected new witness appears. Even so, she receives the support of the girls on the team. The tension between Enric and Terrats over the presidency of the Club increases, as she is willing to hang out to dry Enric's dirty laundry.
12	12	"El partit" (the match)	Juliol 15, 2020	241.000 (10,6%)
The future of the girls is at stake in a final crucial match against the Olympic, which can make them go up to the OK League or make them lose the team forever. Gina can't take it anymore and asks Lorena for absolute sincerity, while Flor is debating whether to return to Buenos Aires or stay in the village for good.
13	13	"El club" (the club)	July 22, 2019	241.000 (11,2%)
The girls have grown apart since the last match and this makes Raquel very lonely, without the support of any of them and especially of Berta. Berta, on the other hand, faces her future: the results of the University Access Tests and the decision her mother has made. Terrats has doubts about her health, at the same time that the presidency of the Club is at stake against Enric. The whole club is awaiting these results, as the continuity of the women's section next season depends on them.

=== Second season ===
Num. global	Num. season	Title	Release Date	TV3 audience
14	1	"Tot canvia" (Everything changes)	March 30, 2020	450.000 (16,2%)
The new player of Minerva's women team, Janina, arrives to stir up the team. Her presence will unsettle the other girls of the team and, also, Lluc will be interested in her. On the other hand, Anna prepares herself to go to her trial in Lisbon while her meeting with German does not turn out as she had thought. Terrats will have to face the economic problems of Minerva's Club and she will accept help from Toni Alcober, Raquel's father, who will become the new sponsor.
15	2	"L'accident" (the accident"	April 6, 2020	343.000 (12,6%)
Flor starts a new love story or romance and she will not live alone at the farmhouse. Raquel meets the new player of the men's team, Ricard, who will have to face a moment of tension in the boys' locker room. Oscar will have a bad day which will end with something that will turn around his life: he will have an accident and will run over Flor.
16	3	"Temps mort" (time-out)	April 13, 2020	328.000 (12,6%)
Anna's trial has not gone well and Anna will not stop until she finds out the reason. In the meantime, Montse and German start to plan their wedding. Flor is still in a critical condition at the Hospital. Lorena suffers a lot and she seeks comfort in his brother Oscar, who has not told the truth about the accident. Emma receives good news because Toni Alcober, Raquel's father, wants to produce some songs with her as a singer.
17	4	"Secrets"	April 20, 2020	367.000 (14,2%)
Anna is going through a bad time: she will confront Terrats to have the team she wants and she will have to assume hard sentence court. Flor will recover from the surgery while Oscar makes a brave but dangerous decision. On the other hand, Olga will create difficulties to the family situation revealing a great secret: Terrats and Santi are having a baby.
18	5	"La fugida" (the escape)	April 27, 2020	366.000 (13,5%)
The appearance of Jamal makes Laila doubt about the racist attitudes of her friends. Also, this will make her get away from Nil even more. The bond or the friendship between Ricard and Raquel will become stronger. Emma wants to go to a concert with Toni but their parents do no allow her. However, she does not give up and escapes from home. Santi and Núria's relationship is not at its best moment and their marriage wavers. The situation of the club gets complicated because of a robbery.
19	6	"La traïció" (threachery)	May 4, 2020	351.000 (13%)
The theft investigation will change the relationship between Lluc and Janina and it will affect Berta, who is thinking about whether she wants to live with her mother or stay with her aunt Terrats. Flor gets the medical discharge and she returns to the farmhouse, where she will recover with the help of Lorena. Anna feels better and better next to Jordi. Emma is looking forward to recording the music video because she wants to spend more time with Toni.
20	7	"Caure" (fall)	May 11, 2020	375.000 (14,5%)
Ricard has a fright during one training session and it makes Raquel get closer to him, but not as much as she would like. Emma wants to celebrate Toni's birthday with him but Raquel discovers a part of their relationship that she does not like. Flor has an infection and she has a relapse. Oscar can not take it anymore.
21	8	"Guanyar o perdre" (win or lose)	May 18, 2020	361.000 (13,3%)
The match of the Generalitat Cup does not go as everyone expected and all conflicts between players explode. This situation makes Anna doubt about Berta being the team captain. Anna and Núria confront Montse, who did not expect that. Lorena can not handle this situation and she ends up confronting her mother and brother.
22	9	"Créixer" (growing up)	May 25, 2020	342.000 (13,9%)
Emma is getting older, is her 18th birthday. She does not want to keep on living with her parents after watching how they have handled her relationship with Toni and her future as a singer. Raquel helps Berta to unmask Janina. Terrats is about to give birth and Santi does not know what role he will have to do.
23	10	"Tornar" (coming back)	June 1, 2020	305.000 (11,9%)
Santi is clear about that he does not want Toni Alcober to be the sponsor anymore, on the opposite side Terrats does not like the idea. On the other hand, Terrats thinks about what to do with Janina and it will bring problems with Berta. Toni and Emma are living together until he finds Raquel in a worrisome situation in the town bar. The relationship between Flor and Lorena wavers because of the truth of the accident.
24	11	"Sempre endavant" (always ahead)	June 8, 2020	352.000 (14,5%)
Berta, who is no longer part of Minerva's team, misses playing hockey. Casually, all the girls meet again to play an improvised game, which makes them join again. Anna and Jordi meet for dinner but German interposes between them. Lorena does not feel good about being away from family.
25	12	"Ruptures" (breakups)	June 15, 2020	353.000 (14%)
Berta has an idea for the future of Minerva's girls and she suggests it to them but not everyone agrees. Lorena, ready not to sink, decides to reform the farmhouse with her brother but they find that it is not in the conditions they thought. Anna tries to regain her relationship with Jordi. At the same time, she figures out that she needs to get away from Terrats.
26	13	"La gran final" (the grand finale)	June 22, 2020	291.000 (12,3%)
The girls realize that Anna does not count on them to play in the grand finale so they feel disappointed. The match does not turn out as Anna and Janina had thought and planned. The women's team is about to live an epic finale while all their players and the coach are thinking about whether they want to stay in the team or not.

== Release ==
The Hockey Girls was released on April 29, 2019 on TV3.

== Places ==
The series was shot in different places in the area of Vallès Occidental, Catalonia. The sports centre called Pavelló Municipal Maria Victor de l'Hoquei Club Palau de Plegamans was the main location. Also, we could highlight, the church of Santa Maria de Palau-solità or the streets of the town. Another important place was the farmhouse located in Canovelles which is called as "Can Marquès".

== Soundtrack ==
The official website of the series highlights 7 songs of the soundtrack, which are the most successful or popular ones.

The first one is the main theme of the soundtrack, "Juntes" (together), which has some features related to hip-hop, Soul and R&B. It is sung by a 23-year-old Catalan singer called Kyle, who also has written and composed it. She has about 9.000 followers on YouTube and 15.000 on Instagram.

The second one comes from the second episode, which starts with the song "Dones" (women), sung by Tesa, Andrea, JazzWoman and Ery.

The third one comes from the moment of the scene between Gina and Lorena in the fourth episode. The song is called "Adicta" (addicted) and it is sung by Lennis Rodriguez.

The others are:

- "Maleducado" (rude), which is Lildami's trap song.
- "Pedres als ulls" (stones in the eyes), El Petit de Cal Eril.
- "Valentina", 31 Fam.
