= El colapso =

- Genre: Dystopia
- Based on: L’Effondrement
- Developed by: Diego Rabasa
- Composer: Gabriel Diazmercado
- Country of origin: Mexico
- Original language: Spanish
- No. of seasons: 1
- No. of episodes: 8

Production
- Executive producers: Julián de Tavira; Diego Rabasa; Gina Cifuentes; Mariana Franco; J.M. Cravioto; Gabriela Remirez de Estenoz; Vicenzo Gratteri; Anna Marsh; Françoise Guyonnet
- Editor: Gabriel Diazmercado
- Production companies: Perro Azul; Pirexia Films

Original release
- Network: Vix+
- Release: 10 February 2023

El colapso is a Mexican dystopian streaming television miniseries based on the French series L'Effondrement. The series is produced by Perro Azul and Pirexia Films. Each episode follows the perspective of different characters as they navigate an unknown catastrophe that collapses the financial, technological, environmental, and political systems.

It premiered on Vix+ on 10 February 2023.

== Notable guest stars ==
- Enrique Arrizon
- Ana Valeria Becerril
- Tiaré Scanda
- Osvaldo Benavides
- Gustavo Sánchez Parra
- Armando Hernández
- Isabel Burr
- Irán Castillo
- Flavio Medina
- Ximena Lamadrid
- Kristyan Ferrer
- Adriana Paz
- José María de Tavira

== Production ==
On 8 August 2022, it was announced that production had begun on the series. The series was filmed entirely in sequence shots.

== Episodes ==
No.	Title	Directed by	Written by	Original release date
1	"El supermercado"	Julián de Tavira	Diego Rabasa	10 February 2023
Faced with the food crisis, Omar, a supermarket employee, is proposed by his girlfriend to escape the city with their friends. However, Omar refuses and decides to stay. While Omar's friends attempt to pay for their groceries, the card machines go down and they decide to steal their items. Omar helps them escape but he ends up intercepted by the security guards of the store. Cast: Enrique Arrizon as Omar, Ana Valeria Becerril as Julia, Tiaré Scanda as Mayra, Assira Abbate as Irene, Juan Luis Medina del Villar as Adrián, Mauricio Topete as Juan, Mauricio Topete as Store manager
2	"La gasolinera"	Carlos Lenin	Diego Rabasa & Julián de Tavira	10 February 2023
Cast: Osvaldo Benavides as Alberto, Mercedes Hernández as Maribel, Gustavo Sánchez Parra as Christopher, Carlos Segura as Police officer, Marco Zapata as Rolando, Vladimir Rivera as Julián, Omara Jiménez Sánchez as Elena, Michelle Corominas Loya as María, Jero Victoria as Lucas
3	"El avión"	Carlos Lenin	Diego Rabasa & Julián de Tavira	10 February 2023
Cast: Armando Hernández as Lucio, Isabel Burr as Isabel, Ianis Guerrero as Miguel, Norma Pablo as María, Alejandro Cuétara as Pilot, Antonio de la Vega as Politician, Héctor Holten as Paul, Luis Lesher as Pedro
4	"La comunidad"	Julián de Tavira	Diego Rabasa	10 February 2023
Cast: Osvaldo Benavides as Alberto, Mariana Gajá as Karina, Juan Carlos Medellin as Juan, Irán Castillo as Eva, Gerardo Trejo Luna as Manuel, Eligio Meléndez as Román, Teté Espinoza as Gina, Ofelia Córdova as Yunuen, Luis Curiel as Óscar, Said Sandoval as Bruno, Juan Pernas as Eduardo, Marco Dzul as Ulises, Omara Jímenez Sánchez as Elena, Michelle Corominas Loya as María
5	"La refinería"	J.M. Cravioto	Diego Rabasa	10 February 2023
Cast: Flavio Medina as Noé, Ximena Lamadrid as Sabina, Fernando Cuautle as Ramiro, Amorita Rasgado as Lilia, Alberto Juárez as Soldier, Karlo Derek Arnauda Picazo as Arturo, Gabriela Cartol as Jazmín
6	"El asilo"	J.M. Cravioto	Diego Rabasa & Julián de Tavira	10 February 2023
Cast: Kristyan Ferrer as Marco, Paloma Woolrich as Gloria, Fernando Larrañaga as Simón, José de Jesús Morales Tolama as Marcel, Mercedes Hernández as Maribel, Patricia Rojas as Susana, Vladimir Rivera as Julián
7	"La isla"	J.M. Cravioto	Diego Rabasa & Julián de Tavira	10 February 2023
Cast: Adriana Paz as Soledad, Nicolás Lemaire as French man, Juan Carlos Domínguez as Caribbean man 1, Alan Cristían Kuhlman as Caribbean man 2, David Fridman as Zodiac voice
8	"La conferencia"	Julián de Tavira	Diego Rabasa	10 February 2023
Cast: José María de Tavira as Jacobo González, Mayra Hermosillo as Amparo, Pedro de Tavira as Gabo, Antonio de la Vega as Politician, Daniel Mandoki as Luis, Manuel Cruz Vivas as Alexis, Yoshira Escárrega as Paulina, Paloma Petra as Adri, Alfonso Borbolla as Octavio
