= Venus (2022 film) =

2022 film by Jaume Balagueró

- Theatrical release poster
- Directed by: Jaume Balagueró
- Screenplay by: Jaume Balagueró; Fernando Navarro
- Based on: "The Dreams in the Witch House" by H. P. Lovecraft
- Produced by: Carolina Bang; Alex de la Iglesia
- Starring: Ester Expósito; Ángela Cremonte; Inés Fernández; Magüi Mira; Aten Soria; María José Sarrate; Sofía Reyes; Fernando Valdivielso; Federico Aguado; Francisco Boira; Pedro Bachura
- Cinematography: Pablo Rosso
- Edited by: Luis de la Madrid
- Production companies: Pokeepsie Films; The Fear Collection II; AIE
- Distributed by: Sony Pictures
- Release dates: 10 September 2022 (TIFF); 2 December 2022 (Spain)
- Country: Spain
- Language: Spanish
- Box office: €0.5 million

Venus is a 2022 Spanish supernatural action horror thriller film directed by Jaume Balagueró from a screenplay by Balagueró and Fernando Navarro, loosely inspired by H. P. Lovecraft's short story "The Dreams in the Witch House". It stars Ester Expósito.

== Plot ==
Featuring according to Balagueró "terror, blood, aberrations and terribly bad people", the fiction is based on H. P. Lovecraft's "The Dreams in the Witch House", transferring the story to a "dirty, modern city" setting in the outskirts of Madrid, focusing on a cursed building in Villaverde Sur. Go-go dancer Lucía, on the run with a stash of pills and hunted by mobsters, takes sanctuary in an apartment block with sister Rocío and niece Alba only to find out that malevolent supernatural forces are at play in the building.

== Cast ==
- Ester Expósito as Lucía
- Ángela Cremonte as Rocío
- Inés Fernández as Alba
- Magüi Mira
- Fernando Valdivielso
- Federico Aguado
- Francisco Boira
- Aten Soria
- María José Sarrate
- Sofía Reyes
- Pedro Bachura

== Production ==
A part of 'The Fear Collection' horror film label, jointly set by Pokeepsie Films and Sony Pictures International Productions in association with Amazon Prime Video. The project was pitched at the Sitges Film Festival in October 2021, with the participation of the director Jaume Balagueró, star performer Ester Expósito as well as Álex de la Iglesia, Carolina Bang, Ricardo Cabornero and Iván Losada. Balagueró penned the screenplay alongside Fernando Navarro. Pablo Rosso worked as cinematographer whereas Luis de la Madrid was responsible for editing. Filming began in November 2021 in Madrid. It moved to Toledo afterwards, shooting in the Santa María de Benquerencia neighborhood ("El Polígono"). Filming had already wrapped in February 2022.

== Release ==
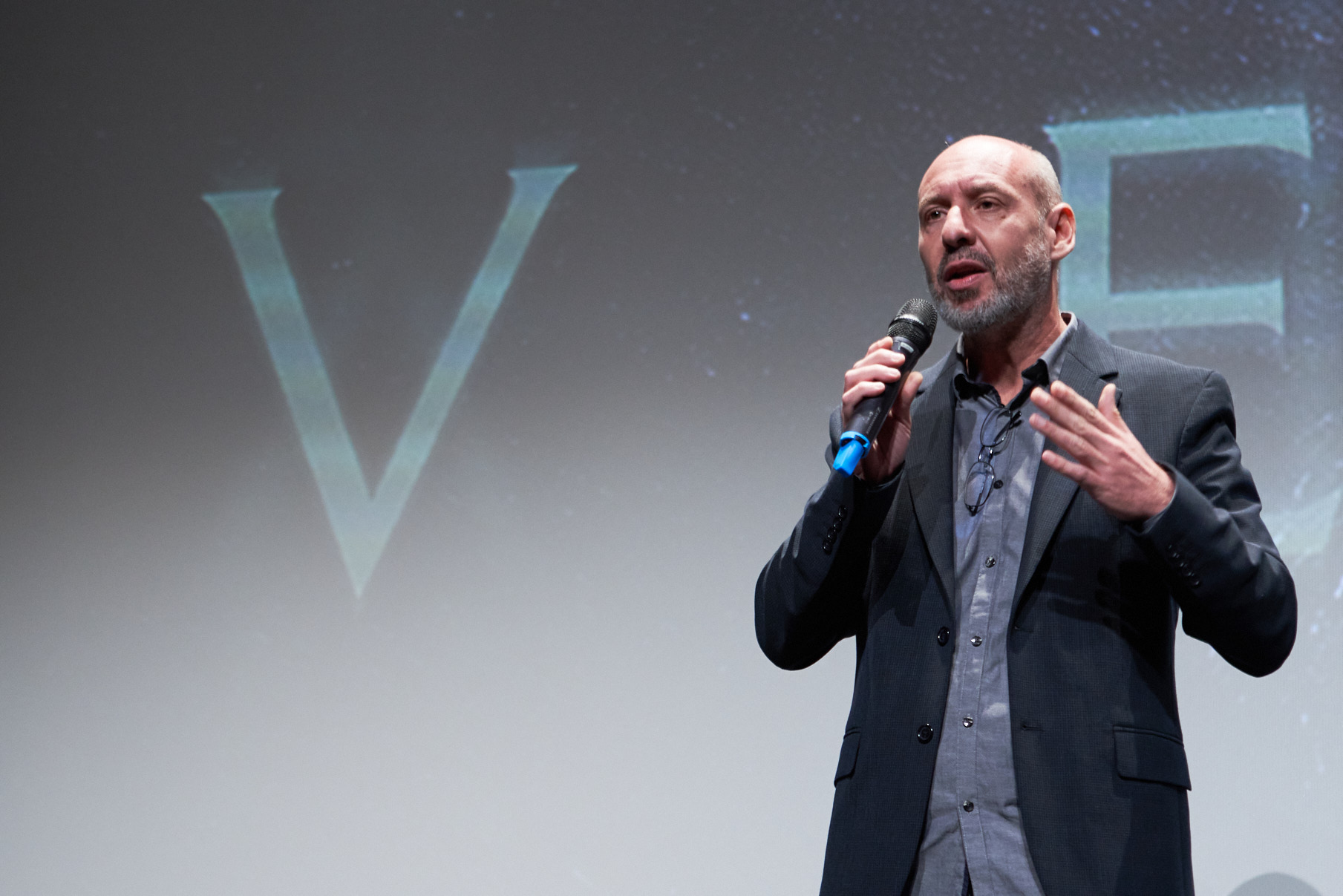
Balagueró presenting his film during the San Sebastián Fantasy and Horror Film Festival in November 2022

The film had its world premiere at the Toronto International Film Festival's Midnight Madness section in September 2022. It also made it to the slate of the Fantastic Fest for its US premiere. Likewise, it screened in the opening gala of the 55th Sitges Film Festival on 6 October 2022. It was released theatrically in Spain on 2 December 2022 by Sony Pictures Entertainment.

== Reception ==
According to the American review aggregation website Rotten Tomatoes, Venus has a 71% approval rating based on 14 reviews from critics, with an average rating of 6.1/10.

Meagan Navarro of Bloody Disgusting rated the film 3½ stars as a "slick and breezy action-horror movie far more memorable for its gruesome high-octane thrills than its cosmic chills".

Shelagh Rowan-Legg of ScreenAnarchy deemed the film "a highly enjoyable film with horror, crime, buckets of blood", "awesome crafty old ladies, a cute kid, and a kick-ass heroine".

Raquel Hernández Luján of HobbyConsolas rated the film with 58 out of 100 points ("so-so"), highlighting Expósito's absolute commitment to her role and the solid production design as positive elements, while lamenting what little is left of the original story and the little amount of cosmic horror, also pointing out that the film could have benefited from taking itself less seriously.

Ricardo Rosado of Fotogramas considered that the film, even if "replete with good intentions", struggles to find the right tone amid the pastiche story, also assessing that Expósito does her best, bearing the weight of the scenes. In contrast, the film struggles to find its audience. Also reviewing for Fotogramas Desirée de Fez rated the film 4 out of 5 stars, highlighting the film's "tribute to the (many) women of horror cinema" as well as Ester Expósito as the best things about the film, otherwise deeming the film to be "frenetic and brutal", bringing together the hallmark of Balagueró's works: "the search for poisoned images that conceptually and formally enclose horror".

Miguel Ángel Romero of Cinemanía rated the film 3½ out of 5 stars, considering it to be a "triumphant" return of Balagueró to his horror origins, flaunting his ability to turn suspense into fantasy and horror.

== See also ==
- List of Spanish films of 2022
