= Miguel Ángel Vivas =

Spanish film director and screenwriter (born 1974)

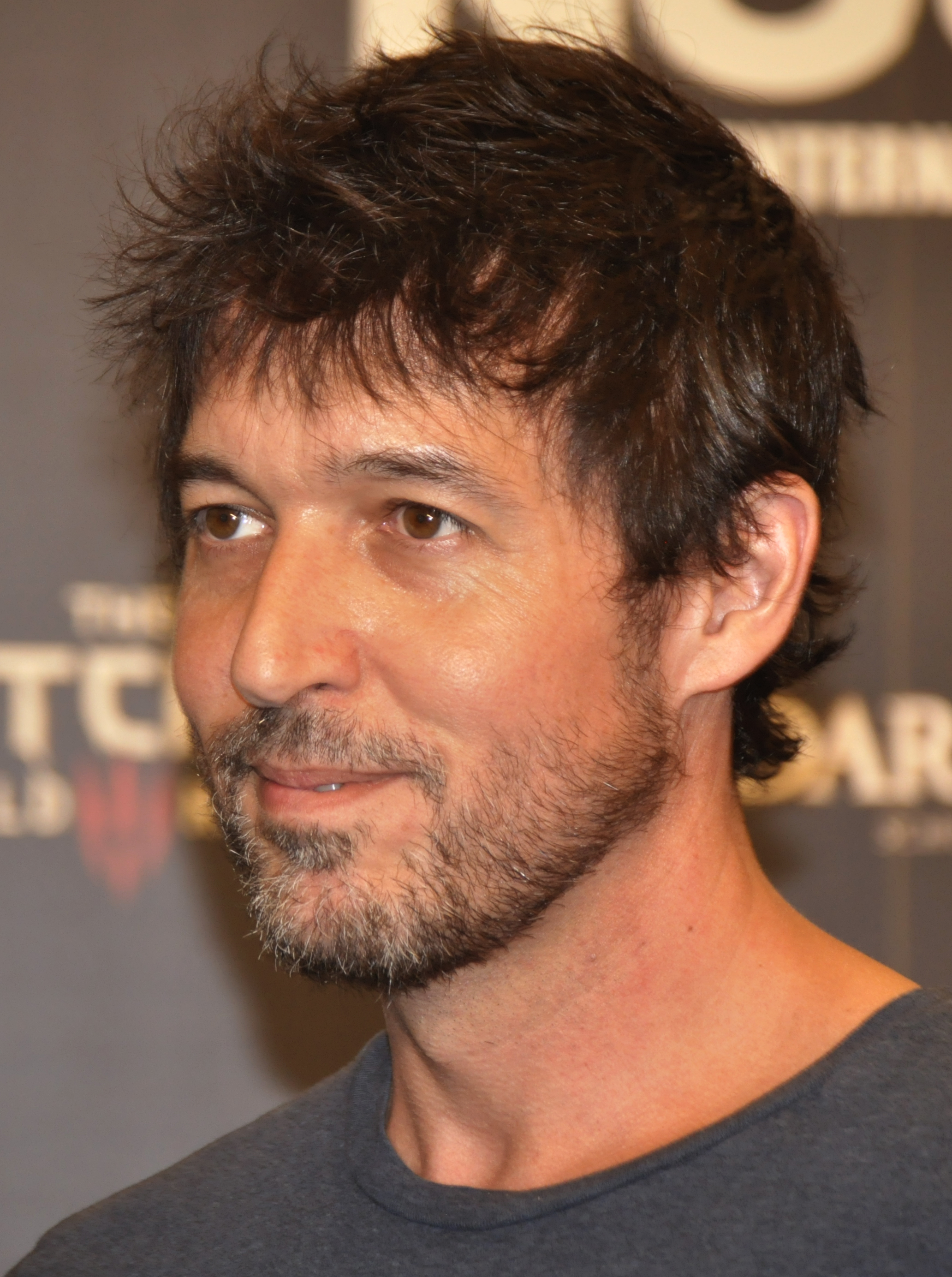
- Vivas in 2015
- Born: 1974 (age 51–52); Sevilla, Spain
- Education: Universidad Europea de Madrid
- Occupations: Film director, television director, screenwriter, actor

Miguel Ángel Vivas (born 1974) is a Spanish director, and screenwriter.

He has directed films such as Extinction (2015), and Your Son (2018).

== Filmography ==
=== As director ===
- Asedio (2023)
- Desaparecidos (2020)
- Unauthorized Living (2018)
- Tu hijo (2018)
- Apaches (2017)
- Money Heist (2017)
- Mar de plástico (2016)
- Inside (2016)
- Extinction (2015)
- Cuéntame un cuento (2013)
- The Room (2011)
- Secuestrados (2010)
- I'll See You in My Dreams (2003)
- El hombre del saco (2002)
- Reflejos (2002)
- Tesoro (1999)

=== As actor ===
- La noche después de que mi novia me dejara (TBA)
