= When Angels Sleep =

2018 Spanish drama film

- Theatrical release poster
- Spanish: Cuando los ángeles duermen
- Directed by: Gonzalo Bendala
- Written by: Gonzalo Bendala
- Produced by: Marta Velasco
- Starring: Marian Álvarez; Julián Villagrán; Ester Expósito
- Cinematography: Sergi Gallardo
- Edited by: Antonio Frutos
- Music by: Pablo Cervantes
- Production companies: Áralan Films; Cuando los Ángeles Duermen AIE
- Distributed by: Filmax
- Release date: 7 September 2018
- Running time: 91 minutes
- Country: Spain
- Language: Spanish

When Angels Sleep (Spanish: Cuando los ángeles duermen) is a 2018 Spanish thriller drama film written and directed by Gonzalo Bendala starring Marian Álvarez, Julián Villagrán and Ester Expósito.

== Plot ==
Germán, a businessman, accidentally hits a teenage girl, Gloria, with his car after falling asleep at the wheel. Germán tries to get help for Gloria, who is badly injured. He attempts to call emergency services, but the operator cannot locate him and Germán is reluctant to tell the truth about the accident. He puts Gloria in the car and attempts to get help for her and her friend Silvia but Gloria succumbs to her injuries en route. Seeing the previously-damaged headlight, Silvia recognizes the car as the one that struck Gloria, saying that since the vehicle swerved directly towards them and never slowed or stopped Germán must have struck them on purpose, and flees.

Germán, desperate not to lose his family and go to jail, drowns Silvia in a river. Later, he hides both bodies in the river, causing them to sink with stones. He returns home, takes a shower and lies down on the bed. His wife tells the police that her husband ran over a dog, became very nervous and called the emergency services in a panic.

A year later, Germán has not gone to work because he is preparing his daughter Estela's birthday party. When his wife calls him for lunch, the news of the case of the two teenage girls murdered a year before comes on TV. The two boys with whom they went out partying have been arrested as the main suspects in the murders. Germán's wife turns off the television.

== Cast ==
- Julián Villagrán as Germán
- Marian Álvarez as Sandra
- Ester Expósito as Silvia
- Sira Alonso de Alarcón as Estela
- Asia Ortega as Gloria
- Daniel Jumillas as Mario
- Christian Mulas as El Chato
- Adolfo Fernández as Sargento Guardia Civil
- Javier Ruiz de Somavía as Luis
- Marisol Membrillo as Rosa
- Ramiro Alonso as Antonio
- Font García as Eduardo

== Production ==
The film was produced by Áralan Films alongside Cuando los Ángeles Duermen AIE with the participation of Canal Sur, ICAA, the regional ministry of Culture of Andalusia and Crea SGR.

== Release ==
Distributed by Filmax, the film was released theatrically in Spain on 7 September 2018. It was released on Netflix on 27 December 2018.

== See also ==
- List of Spanish films of 2018
