= La regenta =

Novel by Leopoldo Alas

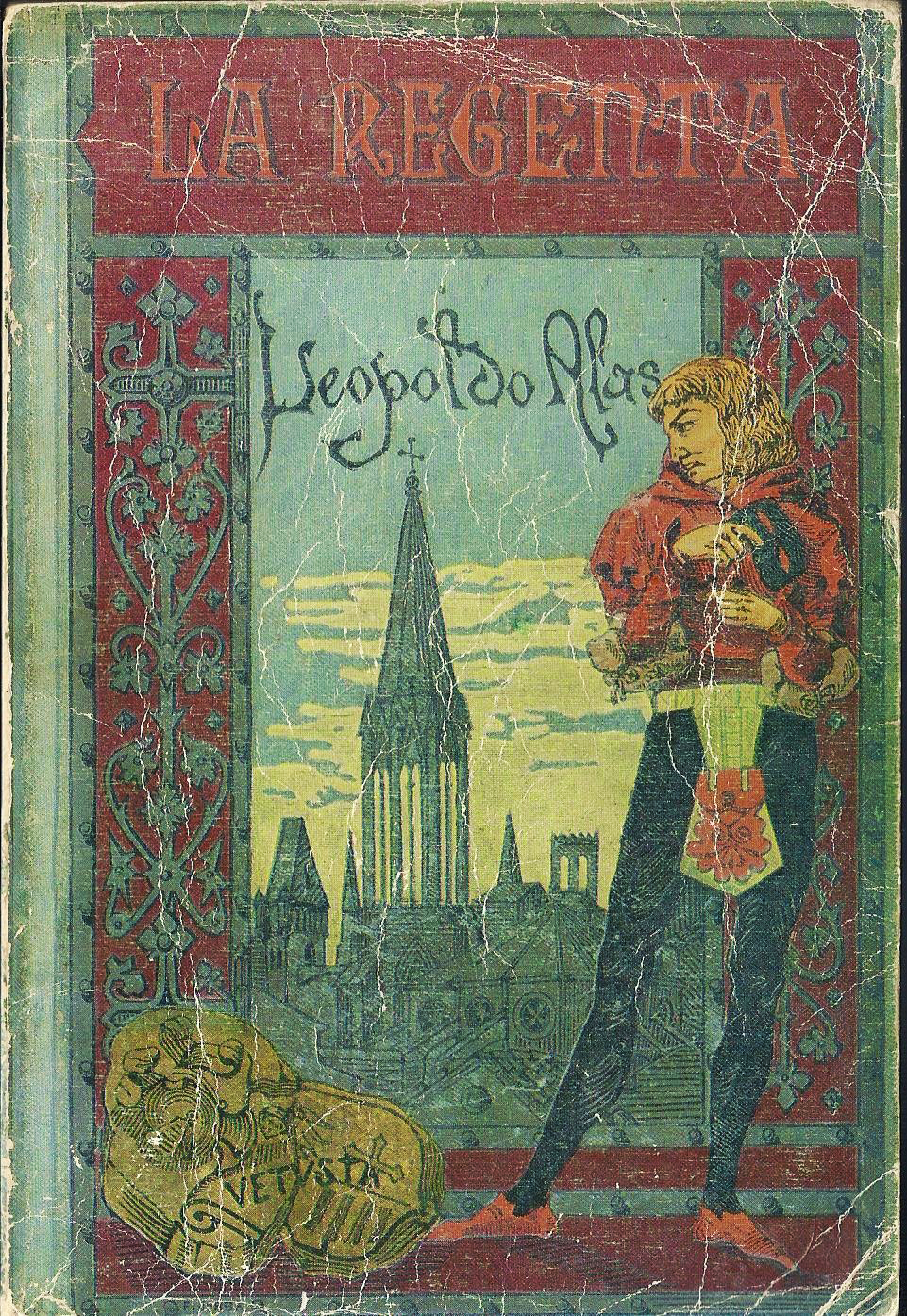
- First edition cover
- Author: Leopoldo Alas "Clarín"
- Language: Spanish
- Genre: Realist novel
- Publication date: 1885
- Publication place: Spain
- Media type: Print

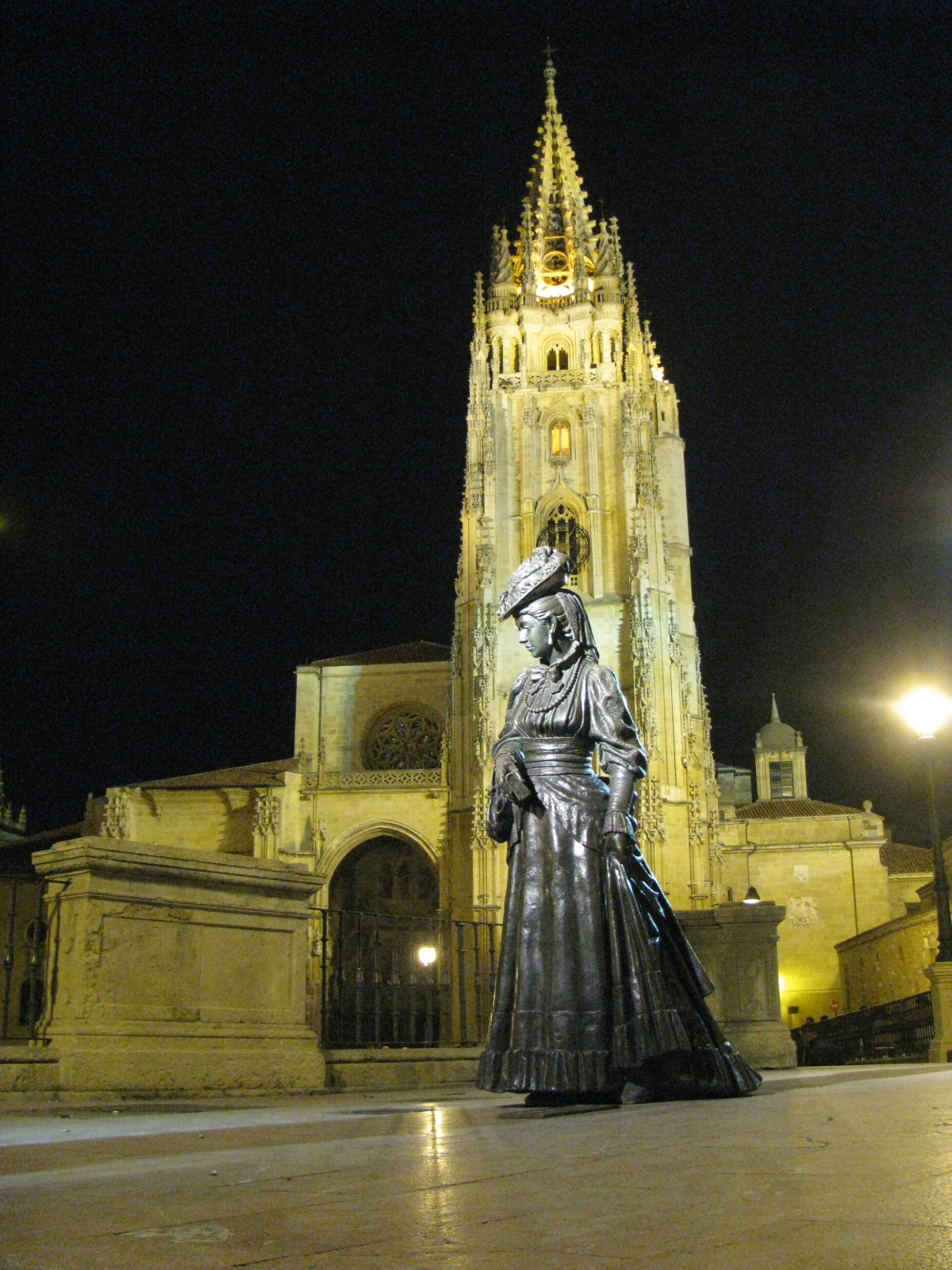
Statue dedicated to La regenta in front of Oviedo Cathedral

La regenta (Spanish pronunciation: [la reˈxenta]; "The [female] Regent") is a realist novel by Spanish author Leopoldo Alas, also known as Clarín, published in two volumes: in 1884 and the second one completed by April 1885.

His critics considered it obscene and irreligious, as well as accusing him of plagiarising Flaubert's Madame Bovary, and the novel was largely forgotten until the end of the twentieth century, when it was recognized as a classic of Spanish literature. It was first translated into English by John D. Rutherford in 1984.

== Plot ==
The story is set in the fictional Vetusta (Spanish vetusto stands for "antiquated", "extremely old", a provincial capital city, very identifiable with Oviedo, the capital of Asturias – especially since it is said that two monks, Nolan and John, founded the city, this being Oviedo's mythical genesis), where the main character of the work, Ana Ozores "La Regenta", marries the former prime magistrate of the city, Víctor Quintanar, a kind but fussy man much older than she. Feeling sentimentally abandoned, Ana lets herself be courted by the province Casanova, Álvaro Mesía. To complete the circle, Don Fermín de Pas (Ana's confessor and canon in the cathedral of Vetusta) also falls in love with her and becomes Mesía's unmentionable rival. A great panorama of secondary characters, portrayed by Clarín with merciless irony, completes the human landscape of the novel.

== Interpretation ==
The author uses the city of Vetusta as a symbol of vulgarity, lack of culture and hypocrisy. On the other hand, Ana incarnates the tortured ideal that perishes progressively before a hypocritical society. With these forces in tension, the Asturian writer narrates a cruel story of Spanish provincial life in the days of the Restoration.

== Adaptations ==
The novel has been adapted to film in 1975, directed by Gonzalo Suárez and to television in 1995, written and directed by Fernando Méndez-Leite. A musical, written and composed by Sigfrido Cecchini, premiered in July 2012 at the Campoamor Theatre, in Oviedo, the hometown of La regenta.

In 2022, Adrián Carbayales published La Rexenta contra Drácula (La Regenta Versus Dracula), a novella written in Asturian that reimagines Clarín's heroine as a secret agent and pits her against Bram Stoker's Dracula. It has been described as "one of the most successful novels in Asturian of the 21st century". The work was soon translated into Spanish. In 2025, he published a sequel, La Rexenta contra Frankenstein.
