= Leopoldo Alas =

Spanish author

Leopoldo Alas "Clarín"
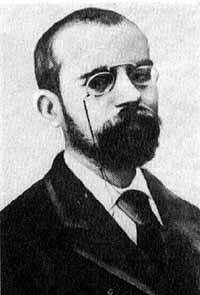
- Born: Leopoldo Enrique García-Alas y Ureña; 25 April 1852; Zamora, Spain
- Died: 13 June 1901 (aged 49); Oviedo, Spain
- Occupations: Novelist, short story writer, journalist, critic, professor
- Writing career
- Pen name: Clarín

Leopoldo Enrique García-Alas y Ureña (25 April 1852 – 13 June 1901), also known as Clarín, was a Spanish realist novelist and journalist born in Zamora. His inflammatory articles, known as paliques (“chitchat”), as well as his advocacy of liberalism and anti-clericalism, made him a formidable and controversial critical voice. He died in Oviedo.

== Biography ==
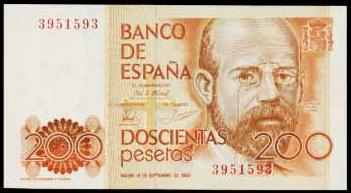
"Clarín" on the 200 Pesetas 1980s banknote.

Alas was born in Zamora, from Asturian parents who moved to that city. He spent his childhood living in León and Guadalajara, until he moved to Oviedo (Asturias) in 1863. There he studied for the Bachillerato (Secondary Education) and began his law studies. He lived in Madrid from 1871 to 1878, where he began his career as a journalist (adopting the pen-name "Clarín" in 1875) and he graduated with the thesis El Derecho y la Moralidad (Law and Morality) in 1878. He taught in Zaragoza from 1882 to 1883. In 1883 he returned to Oviedo to take up a position as professor of Roman law.

Above all, Clarín is the author of La Regenta, his masterpiece and one of the best novels of the 19th century. It is a long work, similar to Flaubert's Madame Bovary, one of its influences. Other influences included Naturalism and Krausism, a philosophical current which promoted the cultural and ethical regeneration of Spain.

For the description of the provincial atmosphere and the city's collective life, Clarín used techniques such as the internal monologue or the free indirect style, which makes the story be narrated by the characters themselves and allows the reader to witness and experience their intimacy.

In 1890, he published a new novel, Su único hijo. Even though most critics consider it as a lesser novel in comparison with La Regenta, it is equal to the former in the skill with which the technical resources are used. Su único hijo was originally meant to be the introduction to a trilogy, but aside from an outline and a few fragments of the two sequels, Su único hijo was Clarín's last full-length novel.

Apart from these works, Clarín is also the author of magnificent stories and of a large number of journalistic articles. He also wrote an essay, "La Literatura en 1881" (1882), in collaboration with Armando Palacio Valdés.

Leopoldo Alas remains an important figure in Spanish literature. His work has been associated with themes including the search for God and humanism. These themes have contributed to a variety of interpretations of his writings, particularly La Regenta.

== Works ==
=== Fiction ===
- La Regenta (The Regent's Wife) (1884–85) [Novel]
- Su único hijo (His Only Son) (1890) [Novel]
- Doña Berta (1892)
- ¡Adiós, Cordera! (1892)
- Cuentos morales (Moral Stories) (1896)
- El gallo de Sócrates (Socrates' Rooster) (1900)

=== Essays ===
- "Solos de saxofon alto 1er" (1881)
- "La literatura en 1881" (1882)
- "Sermón perdido" (1885)
- "Nueva campaña" (1887)
- "Ensayos y revistas" (1892)
- "Palique" (1894)
