= 2020 in Spanish television =

This is a list of Spanish television related events from 2020.

== Events ==
- 12 March: Following the new rules under COVID-19 pandemic, Studio audience is prohibited in TV Shows.
- 14 March: As a consequence of COVID-19 lockdowns, many TV Shows got suspended, such as The chase, Amar es para siempre or Mujeres y Hombres y Viceversa.
- 24 March: Disney+ launches in Spain as part of its European rollout.
- 31 May: TV channel RAC 105 TV officially ends broadcasting to make way for the launch of Fibracat TV.
- 26 June: TV channel Musica por Movistar Plus+ starts broadcasting.
- 7 July: Josep Vilar is appointed Head of the News Department in Televisión Española.

== Debuts ==
| Title | Channel | Debut | Performers/Host | Genre |
|---|---|---|---|---|
| ¡Toma salami! La TV que nos parió | Telecinco | 2020-01-07 | Javier Capitán | Videos |
| La isla de las tentaciones | Telecinco | 2020-01-09 | Mónica Naranjo and Sandra Barneda | Reality Show |
| El Tiempo del Descuento | Telecinco | 2020-01-12 | Jorge Javier Vázquez | Reality Show |
| First Dates: Crucero | Cuatro | 2020-01-13 | Carlos Sobera | Dating Show |
| Stolen Away | Antena 3 | 2020-01-14 | Daniel Grao | Drama Series |
| Auténticos | La Sexta | 2020-01-15 | Alberto Chicote | Docureality |
| Néboa | La 1 | 2020-01-15 | Emma Suárez and Nancho Novo | Drama Series |
| El pueblo | Telecinco | 2020-01-15 | Santi Millán | Sitcom |
| Sánchez y Carbonell | La 2 | 2020-01-16 | Elena S. Sánchez and Pablo Carbonell | Talk Show |
| The Barrier | Atresplayer | 2020-01-19 | Unax Ugalde, Ángela Molina and Olivia Molina | Drama Series |
| Lo de Évole | La Sexta | 2020-02-02 | Jordi Évole | Talk Show |
| El cazador | La 1 | 2020-02-10 | Ion Aramendi | Quiz Show |
| Luimelia | Atresplayer | 2020-02-14 | Paula Usero | Drama Series |
| La habitación del pánico | Cuatro | 2020-02-17 | Nuria Marín | Gossip Show |
| Caronte | Prime Video | 2020-03-06 | Roberto Álamo | Drama Series |
| Muévete en casa | La 2 | 2020-03-23 | Cesc Escolà | sport |
| Juegos sin fronteras | Telecinco | 2020-03-23 | Lara Álvarez and Joaquín Prat | Game Show |
| Todos en casa | La 1 | 2020-03-24 | Ion Aramendi | Variety Show |
| Mzungu, Operación Congo | Cuatro | 2020-03-25 | José Antonio Ruiz Díez. | Docureality |
| Veneno | Atresplayer | 2020-03-29 | Jedet and Daniela Santiago | Drama Series |
| Vamos Juan | TNT | 2020-03-29 | Javier Cámara and María Pujalte | Sitcom |
| La casa de papel: El fenómeno | Netflix | 2020-04-03 | | Documentary |
| Diarios de la cuarentena | La 1 | 2020-04-07 | | Sitcom |
| Iumiuky | Cuatro | 2020-04-08 | | Variety Show |
| La línea invisible | Movistar+ | 2020-04-08 | Alex Monner and Enric Auquer | Drama Series |
| Lies and Deceit | Atresplayer | 2020-04-19 | Ángela Cremonte and Javier Rey | Drama Series |
| Vis a vis: El Oasis | FOX | 2020-04-20 | Najwa Nimri and Maggie Civantos | Drama Series |
| Ruralitas | La 2 | 2020-05-03 | | Documentary |
| Madres. Amor y vida | Prime Video | 2020-05-08 | Belén Rueda | Drama Series |
| Valeria | Netflix | 2020-05-08 | Elísabet Benavent | Drama Series |
| La unidad | Movistar+ | 2020-05-15 | Nathalie Poza | Drama Series |
| White Lines | Netflix | 2020-05-15 | Juan Diego Botto | Drama Series |
| La última cena | Telecinco | 2020-05-22 | Jorge Javier Vázquez | Cooking Show |
| Pongamos que hablo de Sabina | Atresplayer | 2020-05-24 | Iñaki López | Documentary |
| Paca la Piraña, ¿dígame? | Atresplayer | 2020-05-31 | | Sitcom |
| En casa | HBO | 2020-06-03 | | Drama Series |
| Tesoros de la tele | La 2 | 2020-06-04 | | Videos |
| Futbolistas por el mundo | Prime Video | 2020-06-05 | | Documentary |
| Benidorm | Atresplayer | 2020-06-07 | Antonio Pagudo | Sitcom |
| Improvisando | Antena 3 | 2020-06-08 | Arturo Valls | Comedy |
| La casa fuerte | Telecinco | 2020-06-11 | Jorge Javier Vázquez and Sonsoles Ónega | Reality Show |
| The Head | Orange TV | 2020-06-12 | Álvaro Morte | Drama Series |
| Animales nocturnos | Telecinco | 2020-06-15 | Cristina Tárrega | Late Night |
| Typical Spanish | La 1 | 2020-06-19 | Frank Blanco | Game Show |
| Desaparecidos | Prime Video | 2020-06-19 | Maxi Iglesias | Drama Series |
| The Paradise | Orange TV | 2020-06-25 | Fran Perea | Drama Series |
| Relatos con-fin-a-dos | Prime Video | 2020-07-03 | | Miniseries |
| Cocina al punto con Peña y Tamara | La 1 | 2020-07-06 | Javier García Peña and Tamara Falcó | Cooking Show |
| Bloqueados por el muro | La 1 | 2020-07-06 | Àngel Llàcer | Game Show |
| Caminantes | Orange TV | 2020-07-10 | | Drama Series |
| One Way or Another | HBO | 2020-07-22 | | Drama Series |
| De la vida al plato | Prime Video | 2020-07-24 | Juan Echanove | Cooking Show |
| Sing On! Spain | Netflix | 2020-07-24 | Ricky Merino | Music |
| Campamento Albanta | Atresplayer | 2020-07-26 | | Drama Series |
| Inés of My Soul | Prime Video | 2020-07-31 | Elena Rivera | Drama Series |
| Samanta y la vida de... | Cuatro | 2020-09-01 | Samanta Villar | Docureality |
| La hora de La 1 | La 1 | 2020-09-17 | Mònica López | Variety Show |
| Idol Kids | Telecinco | 2020-09-17 | Jesús Vázquez | Talent Show |
| La Línea: La sombra del narco | Netflix | 2020-09-09 | | Documentary |
| The Idhun Chronicles | Netflix | 2020-09-10 | | Cartoon |
| Historias de Alcafrán | La 1 | 2020-09-11 | María Isasi | Sitcom |
| Escenario 0 | HBO | 2020-09-13 | | Theatre |
| Fernando Torres: El último símbolo | Prime Video | 2020-09-18 | Fernando Torres. | Sport |
| HIT | La 1 | 2020-09-21 | Daniel Grao | Drama Series |
| Quién educa a quién | La 1 | 2020-09-21 | Mamen Asencio | Talk Show |
| Horizonte | Telecinco | 2020-09-24 | Iker Jiménez | Science/Culture |
| Fernando | Prime Video | 2020-09-25 | Fernando Alonso | Documentary |
| La pr1mera pregunta | La 1 | 2020-09-26 | Lluís Guilera | News Magazine |
| Patria | HBO | 2020-09-27 | Elena Irureta and Ane Gabarain | Drama Series |
| Como sapiens | La 1 | 2020-09-28 | Miguel Ángel Muñoz | Cooking Show |
| Top Gamers Academy | Neox | 2020-10-04 | Jordi Cruz | Game Show |
| Carolina Marín: Puedo porque pienso que puedo | Prime Video | 2020-10-09 | Carolina Marín | Documentary |
| La sexta clave | La Sexta | 2020-10-14 | Rodrigo Blázquez | News Magazine |
| Banana Split | La 2 | 2020-10-15 | Mikel López Iturriaga | Variety Show |
| Alguien tiene que morir | Netflix | 2020-10-16 | Manolo Caro. | Miniseries |
| Riot Police | Movistar+ | 2020-10-16 | Raúl Arévalo | Drama Series |
| Mask Singer: Adivina quién canta | Antena 3 | 2020-11-04 | Arturo Valls | Music |
| Nasdrovia | Movistar+ | 2020-11-06 | Hugo Silva and Leonor Watling | Drama Series |
| The Minions of Midas | Netflix | 2020-11-13 | Luis Tosar | Drama Series |
| Las cosas claras | La 1 | 2020-11-16 | Jesús Cintora | Talk Show |
| ByAnaMilán | Atresplayer | 2020-11-18 | Ana Milán | Comedy |
| Pioneras | Movistar+ | 2020-11-26 | Nieves Concostrina | Documentary |
| 30 Coins | HBO | 2020-11-29 | Miguel Ángel Silvestre | Drama Series |
| Dime Quién Soy: Mistress of War | Movistar+ | 2020-12-04 | Irene Escolar | Drama Series |
| The Mess You Leave Behind | Netflix | 2020-12-11 | Inma Cuesta | Drama Series |
| Divididos | La Sexta | 2020-12-15 | Luján Argüelles | Quiz Show |
| El Cid | Prime Video | 2020-12-18 | Jaime Lorente | Drama Series |

== Television shows ==
- La 1
  - Telediario (1957– )
  - Informe Semanal (1973– )
  - Telepasión española (1990– )
  - Cine de barrio (1995– )
  - Corazón (1997– )
  - Cuéntame cómo pasó (2001– )
  - España Directo (2005–2022)
  - Comando actualidad (2008– )
  - Españoles en el mundo (2009 – )
  - Audiencia abierta (2012– )
  - Flash Moda (2012– )
  - MasterChef (2013– )
  - MasterChef Junior (2013– )
  - Viaje al centro de la tele (2013– )
  - Aquí la Tierra (2014– )
  - Ochéntame otra vez (2014–2021)
  - TVEmos (2015–2021)
  - Acacias 38 (2015–2021)
  - MasterChef Celebrity (2016– )
  - Estoy vivo (2017–2021)
  - Servir y proteger (2017–2023)
  - Maestros de la costura (2018– )
  - El Paisano (2018– )
  - Lazos de sangre (2018– )
  - La Caza (2019– )
  - Prodigios (2019–2021)
  - Mercado Central (2019–2021)
- Telecinco
  - Informativos Telecinco (1990– )
  - Survivor Spain (2000– )
  - El Programa de Ana Rosa (2005–2023)
  - Survivor Spain (2006– )
  - La que se avecina (2007– )
  - Sálvame (2009–2023)
  - Deluxe (2009–2023)
  - Got Talent España (2016– )
  - Mi casa es la tuya (2016– )
  - Socialité (2017– )
  - Viva la vida (2017–2022)
  - Volverte a ver (2018–2021)
  - Ya es mediodía (2018–2023)
  - Mujeres al poder (2019–2022)
- La 2
  - Al filo de lo imposble (1982– )
  - Pueblo de Dios (1982– )
  - Últimas preguntas (1983– )
  - En portada (1984– )
  - Metrópolis (1985– )
  - Documentos TV (1986– )
  - Tendido cero (1986– )
  - Días de cine (1991– )
  - La Aventura del saber (1992– )
  - Jara y sedal (1992– )
  - La noche temática, (1995– )
  - Agrosfera (1997– )
  - El escarabajo verde (1997– )
  - Saber y ganar (1997– )
  - El Cine de La 2 (1998– )
  - Versión española (1998– )
  - Aquí hay trabajo (2000– )
  - Shalom (2003– )
  - Cámara abierta 2.0 (2007– )
  - Página 2 (2007– )
  - En lengua de signos (2008– )
  - Zoom tendencias ( 2008– )
  - Fábrica de ideas (2008–2017)
  - RTVE responde (2009– )
  - Imprescindibles (2010– )
  - Para todos la Dos (2010– )
  - Cómo nos reímos (2012– )
  - ¡Atención obras! (2013– )
  - Cachitos de hierro y cromo (2013– )
  - Órbita Laika (2014–)
  - 80 cm (2015–)
  - El cazador de cerebros (2015– )
  - Historia de nuestro cine (2015– )
  - Medina (2016– )
  - País mágico, Un (2017– )
  - ¡Qué animal! (2017– )
  - La hora musa (2018–2021)
  - Un país para escucharlo (2019–2021)
- Antena 3
  - Antena 3 Noticias (1990– )
  - Espejo público (1996– )
  - La ruleta de la fortuna (2006– )
  - Karlos Arguiñano en tu cocina (2010– )
  - Tu cara me suena (2011– )
  - El Hormiguero (2011– )
  - ¡Ahora caigo! (2011–2021)
  - Centímetros cúblicos (2012– )
  - Amar es para siempre (2013– )
  - Me resbala (2013–2021)
  - ¡Boom! (2014–2022)
  - La Voz (2019– )
  - La Voz Kids (2019– )
  - La Voz Senior (2019–2022)
  - Pequeñas coincidencias (2019–2021)
- La Sexta
  - El Intermedio (2006– )
  - La Sexta Noticias (2006– )
  - Salvados (2008– )
  - Al rojo vivo (2011– )
  - La Sexta columna (2012– )
  - Más vale tarde (2012– )
  - Equipo de investigación (2013– )
  - Jugones (2013– )
  - El objetivo (2013–2022)
  - Zapeando (2013– )
  - La Sexta noche (2013–2022)
  - El jefe infiltrado (2014– )
  - ¿Dónde estabas entonces? (2017–2021)
  - ¿Te lo vas a comer? (2018– )
  - Arusitys (2018– )
  - Liarla Pardo (2018–2021)
- Cuatro
  - Cuarto milenio (2005– )
  - Planeta Calleja (2014– )
  - Volando voy (2015– )
  - Los Gipsy Kings (2015–2021)
  - En el punto de mira (2016–2022)
  - First Dates (2016– )
  - Ven a cenar conmigo (2017–2021)
  - Mujeres y Hombres y Viceversa (2018–2021)
  - El concurso del año (2018–2021)
  - Ven a cenar conmigo: Gourmet edition (2018–2021)
  - Viajeros Cuatro (2018 – )
  - Cuatro al día (2019– )
  - Todo es mentira (2019– )
- Clan
  - Pocoyo (2005– )

== Ending this year ==
- La 1
  - Los Desayunos de TVE (1994–2020)
  - La Mañana de La 1 (2009–2020)
  - El ministerio del tiempo (2015–2020)
  - Unauthorized Living (2018–2020)
  - A partir de hoy (2019–2020)
  - Hacer de comer (2019–2020)
- La 2
  - La 2 noticias (1994–2020)
  - España en comunidad (2000–2020)
- Antena 3
  - El secreto de Puente Viejo (2011–2020)
- Telecinco
  - ¡Toma salami! (2019–2020)
- Cuatro
  - Héroes, más allá del deber (2017–2020)
  - Adivina qué hago esta noche (2019–2020)
  - El bribón (2019–2020)
- La Sexta
  - Pesadilla en la cocina (2012–2020)
- Real Madrid TV
  - 90 minuti (2016–2020)
- Movistar+
  - Virtual Hero (2018–2020)

== Changes of network affiliation ==
| Show | Moved From | Moved To |
|---|---|---|
| ¿Quién quiere ser millonario? (1999– ) | La Sexta | Antena 3 |
| Pasapalabra (2000– ) | Telecinco | Antena 3 |

== Deaths ==
- 18 January – Alicia Gómez Montano, journalist, 64.
- 23 January – Félix Casas, actor, 89.
- 23 March – Lucia Bosè, actress, 89.
- 12 April – Mary Begoña, actress, 95.
- 28 April – Michael Robinson, footballer, presenter and sports commentator, 61.
- 3 May – Miguel Ors – sports journalist, 91.
- 7 June – Pepe Martín – actor, 87.
- 11 June – Rosa Maria Sardà, actress, 78.
- 26 June – Jordi Mestre, 38, actor.
- 21 August – Manuel Gallardo, actor, 85.
- 13 October – Marisa de Leza, actress, 87.
- 24 November – Montserrat Carulla, actress, 90.

== See also ==
- 2020 in Spain
