= Def Con Dos =

Spanish rap metal band

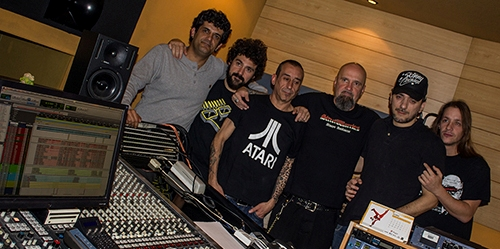

Background information
- Origin: Vigo and Madrid, Spain
- Genre: Rap metal
- Years active: 1989-1999, 2004-present
- Spinoffs: Strawberry Hardcore
- Members: Alberto Marín; Samuel Barranco; Sagan Ummo; Kiki Tornado; J. Al Ándalus; Cesar Strawberry
- Website: defcondos.com

Def Con Dos (meaning DEFense CONdition TWO) is a rap metal band from Madrid, Spain.

== History and style ==
Greatly influenced by hip hop bands Beastie Boys, Public Enemy, and Run D.M.C., and rock band Siniestro Total, they started rapping over hip hop bases created by producer Julián Hernández (musician and singer of Siniestro Total). In their Segundo Asalto tape (1989), the sound still was basically hip hop, but they started using rock guitars.

Texts in their lyrics and in the manifestos enclosed with their records are highly offensive and complex, with many references to pop culture: pop music, Spanish folklore, news, publicity, cinema, literature and Spanish and American comics. Armas pal pueblo (1994) was probably the first album made in Spain with a Spanish version of the Parental advisory: Explicit lyrics label on the cover.

Partly due to their polemical texts, DCD did not get much coverage from mainstream media in their beginnings, with the exception of some programs in Radio 3, a station belonging to the government-run Radiotelevisión Española. This situation changed when Basque film maker Álex de la Iglesia appointed them for the main themes in his films Acción mutante (Mutant Action, 1993) and El día de la bestia (The Day of the Beast, 1995). Álex de la Iglesia also directed the videoclips for these songs.

They disbanded in 1999, but in 2004 announced the comeback of the band with all but one (Gautxito, one of the guitars) of the original members. Meanwhile, César Strawberry and Manolo Tejeringo, started a new project named Strawberry Hardcore in 2001, playing a classic melodic hardcore. They have recorded three albums: Lo que me da la gana (a maxi CD in 2001), Strawberry h/c (their first full-length album in 2002) and Todos vamos a morir (2007).

The current members of Def Con Dos are César Strawberry (vocals), Alberto Marín, Samuel Barranco, Sagan, Kiki Tornado (drums), and J. Al Ándalus (programming, producing and guitars).

In January 2017, César Strawberry was sentenced to a year in jail by the Spanish Supreme Court for remarks deemed as pro-terrorism made on Twitter between 2013 and 2014. Amnesty International cited his case as an example of the excesses being committed in Spain under anti-terror laws. César Strawberry branded the sentence as a "political sentence". He said he received the sentence "calmly" and told that it "confirms the suspicions that, as a citizen, I was having that in this country the justice system is extremely politicised", which is why he announced his intention to "appeal everything he has to appeal", including European courts, to prove his innocence. "I suspect that once again the European Court of Human Rights will have to call the Spanish Supreme Court to account and that we will make an international fool of ourselves that we could have spared ourselves", for whom the new ruling "endangers democracy, as it institutionalises the politics of fear of expressing oneself and sows doubts about judicial impartiality". Finally, in 2020 the Spanish Constitutional Court declared that Strawberry's remarks were protected under freedom of speech and therefore revoked Supreme Court's ruling, being Strawberry acquitted from all charges. In 2024, Marín competed on MasterChef España Season 12 ranking in 6th place.

== Members ==
- César Strawberry - vocals (1989-)
- J. Al Ándalus - bass (1989-)
- Kike Tornado - drums (2004-)
- Alberto Marín - guitar (2015-)
- Sagan Ummo - vocals (2016-)
- Samuel Barranco - vocals (2016-)

== Past members ==
- Julián Hernández (1988-1995)
- Peón Kurtz - vocals (1988-2016)
- Juanito Sangre - vocals (1989-2009)
- Patacho - guitar (1991-1993)
- Mariano Lozano - samples (1991-1999)
- Óscar López - programming, vocals (1991-1994)
- Bul Bul - drums (1992-1993)
- Juanjo Pizarro - guitar (1992-1995,1997)
- Juanjo Melero - guitar (1993-1994)
- José "Niño" Bruno - drums (1993-1999)
- Nicolás - guitar (1994-1997)
- Manolo Benítez - guitar (1995)
- Julián Kanevsky - guitar (1995-1999)
- Manolo Tejeringo - guitar (1997-2009)
- Ken - guitar (2009-2015)
- Marco Masacre - vocals (2009-2015)

== Discography ==
- Primer Asalto (Demo tape) (1989 Demo tape)
- Segundo Asalto (1989 Dro East West)
- Tercer Asalto (includes Primer Asalto) (1991 Dro East West 1991)
- Armas pal pueblo (1994 Dro East West) (Ref: 4509–92476–2)
- Alzheimer (1995 Dro East West) (Ref: 4509–99705–2)
- Ultramemia (1996 Dro East West) (Ref: 0630–16516–2)
- De Poca Madre (1998 Dro East West) (Ref: 3984255802)
- Dogmatofobia (1999 Dro East West)
- Recargando (2004 Dro East West)
- 6 Dementes Contra el Mundo (2006 Dro East West)
- Hipotécate Tú (2009 Dro East West)
- España es idiota (2013)
