= 30 Coins =

Spanish mystery horror television series

- Spanish: 30 monedas
- Genre: Mystery; Horror; Thriller
- Created by: Álex de la Iglesia
- Written by: Álex de la Iglesia; Jorge Guerricaechevarría
- Directed by: Álex de la Iglesia
- Starring: Eduard Fernández; Megan Montaner; Miguel Ángel Silvestre; Macarena Gómez; Pepón Nieto; Manolo Solo; Paul Giamatti (2-); Najwa Nimri (2-)
- Composer: Roque Baños
- Country of origin: Spain
- Original languages: Spanish; Italian; English; French
- No. of seasons: 2
- No. of episodes: 16

Production
- Executive producers: Álex de la Iglesia; Carolina Bang; Miguel Salvat; Steve Matthews; Antony Root
- Cinematography: Pablo Rosso
- Editor: Domingo González
- Production companies: HBO Nordic AB; Pokeepsie Films

Original release
- Network: HBO Europe
- Release: November 29, 2020 – December 11, 2023

30 Coins (Spanish: 30 monedas) is a Spanish mystery horror television series created by Álex de la Iglesia for HBO Europe. Directed and written by De la Iglesia and co-written by Jorge Guerricaechevarría, the series follows Father Vergara, an exorcist who the church exiles to Pedraza, a remote village in Spain, where he hopes his enemies forget him.

The first season premiered on November 29, 2020, on HBO Europe; the second season, whose filming reportedly began in February 2022, premiered on Max on October 23, 2023.

In May 2024, Álex de la Iglesia stated that Max had not renewed the series, but the episodes of what would have been the third and final season were already written, and he intended to find a way to get them produced.

== Synopsis ==
Father Vergara is an exorcist and ex-convict residing in the small Spanish town of Pedraza, attempting to move on from a troubled past. As paranormal phenomena start taking place in the village, he finds help in local mayor Paco and town veterinarian Elena, in figuring out the mystery seemingly related to a coin he owns. This coin might be one of the thirty pieces of silver paid to Judas Iscariot for betraying Jesus and handing him over to the Romans. The three will find themselves caught in a conspiracy involving the Holy See itself, threatening the world as they know it.

== Cast ==
Introduced in season 1

- Eduard Fernández as Padre Manuel Vergara (Father Manuel Vergara)
- Megan Montaner as Elena Martín
- Miguel Ángel Silvestre as Paco
- Macarena Gómez as Mercedes Gandía
- Pepón Nieto as Sargento Lagunas (Sargeant Lagunas)
- Manolo Solo as Cardinal Santoro
- Cosimo Fusco as Angelo
- Carmen Machi as Carmen
- Paco Tous as Jesús
- Secun de la Rosa as Martín
- Javier Bódalo as Antonio (the village idiot)
- Antonio Velázquez as Roque
- Nourdín Batán as Jaime
- Carla Campra as Vane
- Carla Tous as Sole
- Óscar Ortuño as Nacho
- Abril Montilla as Elvira
- Alberto Bang as Richi
- Leonardo Nigro as Sandro
- Luigi Diberti as Lombardi
- Víctor Clavijo as Mario
- Nuria González as Salcedo
- Greta Fernández as Miralles
- Francisco Reyes as Lagrange

Introduced in season 2

- Najwa Nimri as Haruka
- Manuel Burque as Jonás
- Carlos Bardem as Cardenal de la Cruz
- Paul Giamatti as Christian Barbrow
- Clara Wong as Amiga de Barbrow

== Production ==
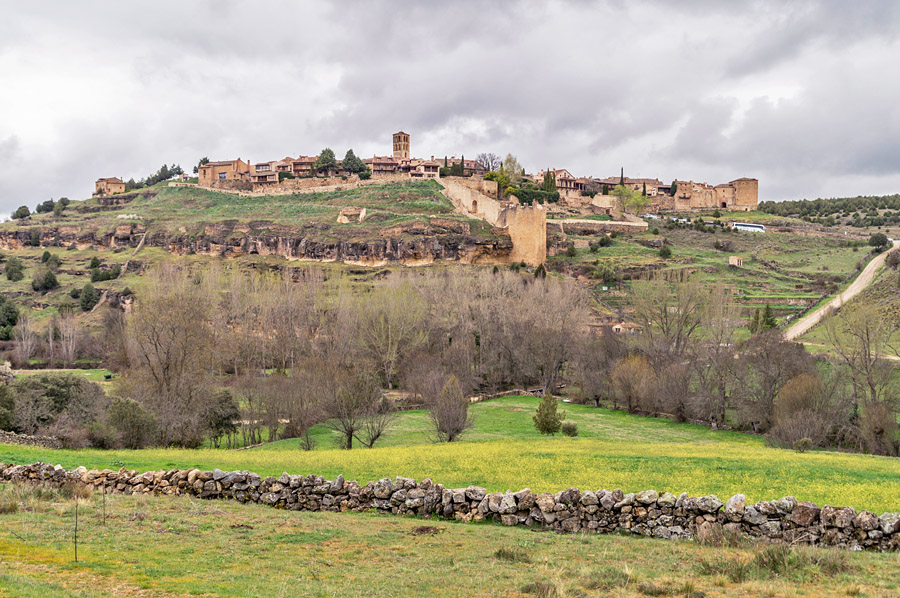
The fiction is set in Pedraza and the village was likewise the prime shooting location.

The series was produced by Pokeepsie Films for HBO Europe, with the participation of HBO Latin America. Álex de la Iglesia and Carolina Bang (on behalf of Pokeepsie Films) and Miguel Salvat, Steve Matthews and Antony Root (on behalf of HBO Europe) were the series' executive producers. The musical score was composed by Roque Baños.

Most of the production occurred in Pedraza, province of Segovia. Production also worked in Sepúlveda (also in the province of Segovia), and the Aldeadávila Dam (province of Salamanca). Other brief shooting locations include New York, Jerusalem, Paris, Geneva, Rome, Campo Real, Madrid, and Alcalá de Henares (including outdoor shots).

Some indoor scenes were shot in the Castle of Calatrava la Nueva in Aldea del Rey and the Palace of the Marquis of Santa Cruz in Viso del Marqués, both in the province of Ciudad Real; the Castle of Guadamur (province of Toledo), the library of the Instituto del Patrimonio Cultural de España and the University of Salamanca's General Historical Library.

After months of rumours, social media content published by De la Iglesia regarding a new season and the self-announcement of Najwa Nimri as a cast addition on the red carpet of the 9th Feroz Awards, HBO Max officially confirmed the return of the series for a second season on 11 February 2022, with shooting already underway. Footage for season 2 was shot in the city of Toledo.

== Episodes ==
=== Season 1 ===
No. overall	No. in season	Title	Directed by	Written by	Original release date
1	1	"Cobwebs" (Telarañas)	Álex de la Iglesia	Álex de la Iglesia and Jorge Guerricaechevarría	November 29, 2020
In Geneva, Switzerland, a gunman nonchalantly shoots every officer at a bank while shrugging off bullets. In the vault, he takes a coin from a safety deposit box. Outside, he is picked up in a car with a sunglass-wearing priest in the back. The priest takes the cash, and removes the charm that kept the gunman alive. In Pedraza, Spain, a cow at the Alonso farm gives birth to a human baby. To prevent bad publicity for the town, Mayor Paco goes with Elena, the veterinarian who delivered him, and the farm workers to the local priest. Padre Manuel Vergara argues that it is not a supernatural event but that the calf and baby were switched to cover the child of an unwanted pregnancy. A young, religious, homeless man, Antonio, believes the baby is evil and takes him to the church's roof to kill him. Instead, he gives it to Elena before jumping, telling the priest it is for his sins. The Alonsos take the child for safekeeping. Elena finds one of the coins on Antonio. Paco and Elena find out that Manuel caused a boy to die doing an exorcism. Elena confronts the priest about his past, who admits the boy is where he got the coin from. Elena visits the Alonsos, where the husband tells her their son died in an accident as a toddler. His wife, Carmen, sees the boy's birth as a blessing. The child is as large as Carmen when Elena goes to his room. Later, Carmen blends liver for the child, making the husband question it all. She repeatedly stabs him. Elena returns with Paco, finding the downstairs covered in cobwebs made from wool. Carmen attacks them, wrapping Paco in the wool cobwebs while Elena escapes. When Manuel and the police return to the house, the police shoot Carmen in defence. Speaking to Manuel, he advises Elena to be rational as she finds the skin the child has shed. Paco and Carmen are taken away in an ambulance. Carmen wakes up and calls her "son", now a spider-like monster, causing the ambulance to crash, and she escapes. At the church, Manuel readies for the beast with Elena there. A seemingly possessed Carmen arrives and asks Manuel for the coin, saying it is from hell and claiming she was at the exorcism. After shooting Carmen with bullets blessed by holy water, the monster comes for the coin which Elena has. Her phone dials Paco in their struggle, and he tells her to destroy a charm Carmen uses to control the Spider monster. It drives the monster away. Manuel explains away the events as a hallucination. He then asks Elena for the coin, but she keeps it, repeating his words that it is "just a piece of metal."
2	2	"Ouija" (Ouija)	Álex de la Iglesia	Álex de la Iglesia and Jorge Guerricaechevarría	December 6, 2020
3	3	"The Mirror" (El espejo)	Álex de la Iglesia	Álex de la Iglesia and Jorge Guerricaechevarría	December 13, 2020
4	4	"Memories" (Recuerdos)	Álex de la Iglesia	Álex de la Iglesia and Jorge Guerricaechevarría	December 20, 2020
5	5	"The Double" (El doble)	Álex de la Iglesia	Álex de la Iglesia and Jorge Guerricaechevarría	December 27, 2020
6	6	"Holy War" (Guerra Santa)	Álex de la Iglesia	Álex de la Iglesia and Jorge Guerricaechevarría	January 3, 2021
7	7	"The Glass Box" (La caja de cristal)	Álex de la Iglesia	Álex de la Iglesia and Jorge Guerricaechevarría	January 10, 2021
8	8	"Sacrifice" (Sacrificio)	Álex de la Iglesia	Álex de la Iglesia and Jorge Guerricaechevarría	January 17, 2021

=== Season 2 ===
No. overall	No. in season	Title	Directed by	Written by	Original release date
9	1	"Ghost Town" (El pueblo fantasma)	Álex de la Iglesia	Álex de la Iglesia and Jorge Guerricaechevarría	October 23, 2023
10	2	"Dreamlands" (Las tierras del sueño)	Álex de la Iglesia	Álex de la Iglesia and Jorge Guerricaechevarría	October 30, 2023
11	3	"Hellish Creatures" (Criaturas infernales)	Álex de la Iglesia	Álex de la Iglesia and Jorge Guerricaechevarría	November 6, 2023
12	4	"The Black Book of the Mad Arab" (El libro negro del árabe loco)	Álex de la Iglesia	Álex de la Iglesia and Jorge Guerricaechevarría	November 13, 2023
13	5	"The Arcane Symbol" (El símbolo arcano)	Álex de la Iglesia	Álex de la Iglesia and Jorge Guerricaechevarría	November 20, 2023
14	6	"Reset the World" (Reiniciar el mundo)	Álex de la Iglesia	Álex de la Iglesia and Jorge Guerricaechevarría	November 27, 2023
15	7	"The Two Cores" (Los Dos Núcleos)	Álex de la Iglesia	Álex de la Iglesia and Jorge Guerricaechevarría	December 4, 2023
16	8	"The Eye of God" (El ojo de Dios)	Álex de la Iglesia	Álex de la Iglesia and Jorge Guerricaechevarría	December 11, 2023

== Release ==
The first episode of the eight-part first season premiered on HBO Europe on 29 November 2020. The rest of the episodes were released every week. The series aired in the United States via HBO and HBO Max in 2021 before airing on HBO Latin America.

The first episode was screened at the 77th Venice International Film Festival on September 11, 2020.

== Reception ==
According to the American review aggregation website Rotten Tomatoes, season 1 of 30 Coins has a 91% approval rating based on 11 reviews from critics, with an average rating of 7.7/10 and a critics' consensus on the site reading: "propulsive action, effective haunts, and just the right amount of absurdity make 30 Coins a twisty terror treat".

Scout Tafoya of RogerEbert.com found the series entertaining, writing that de la Iglesia and Guerricaechevarría "peddle a Catholic version of the Cosmic Horrors of William Hope Hodgson and H.P. Lovecraft"; "their style a crispy plait of Luis Buñuel and Alex Cox". Rosie Knight of IGN considers that "much of the strength of 30 Coins comes from [its] trio of leads" and that "easily the best thing about the show is that, aside from the horror, it also works as an Indiana Jones-style artifact quest," giving it 8 out of 10. Marissa de la Cerda, writing for The A.V. Club, writes, "The grotesqueries that de la Iglesia is known for are on full display in the phantasmagoric visuals and viscera". She grades it a B, concluding that it "successfully lean[s] into its drama-horror hybrid to underscore the characters' humanity."

Reviewing for Cinemanía, Miguel Ángel Romero considered De la Iglesia's creation as an immersion in the Lovecraftian universe and also noted an implicit reference to Nyarlathotep in the season finale. Romero praised Cosimo Fusco's chilling performance and the performances of Eduard Fernández and Manolo Solo in antagonist roles, also welcoming the referential nature of De la Iglesia's work (inspired by the likes of Antonio Mercero, Ridley Scott and John Carpenter). Among the negative aspects to be improved, Romero cited the "particularly calamitous CGI" featured in the last episodes and the disjointed plots.

=== Accolades ===
Year	Award	Category	Nominee(s)	Result	Ref.
2021	8th Feroz Awards	Best Drama Series	30 Coins	Nominated	
2021	8th Feroz Awards	Best Main Actor in a Series	Eduard Fernández	Won	
2021	8th Feroz Awards	Best Main Actress in a Series	Megan Montaner	Nominated	
2021	8th Feroz Awards	Best Supporting Actor in a Series	Manolo Solo	Nominated	
2021	8th Feroz Awards	Best Supporting Actress in a Series	Macarena Gómez	Nominated	
2021	8th Feroz Awards	Best Supporting Actress in a Series	Carmen Machi	Nominated	
2021	71st Fotogramas de Plata	Best Television Actor	Eduard Fernández	Won	
2022	9th MiM Series Awards	Best Drama Series		Won	
2022	9th MiM Series Awards	Best Direction	Álex de la Iglesia	Nominated	
2022	30th Actors and Actresses Union Awards	Best TV Actor in a Minor Role	Secun de la Rosa	Nominated	
2023	29th Forqué Awards	Best TV Series		Nominated	
2024	11th Platino Awards	Best Supporting Actor in a Miniseries or TV series	Manolo Solo	Nominated	
2024	2024 Premios Aura	Best Drama series	30 Coins	Nominated	

== See also ==
- 2020 in Spanish television
