= Four's a Crowd (2022 film) =

- Theatrical release poster
- Spanish: El cuarto pasajero
- Directed by: Álex de la Iglesia
- Written by: Jorge Guerricaechevarría; Álex de la Iglesia
- Produced by: Ghislain Barrois; Álvaro Augustin; Álex de la Iglesia; Carolina Bang
- Starring: Alberto San Juan; Blanca Suárez; Ernesto Alterio; Rubén Cortada; Carlos Areces
- Cinematography: Rita Noriega
- Edited by: Domingo González
- Music by: Roque Baños
- Production companies: Telecinco Cinema; Pokeepsie Films; Te Has Venido Arriba AIE
- Distributed by: Sony Pictures Entertainment Iberia
- Release date: 28 October 2022
- Running time: 99 minutes
- Country: Spain
- Language: Spanish
- Box office: €4.3 million

Four's a Crowd (Spanish: El cuarto pasajero) (Note: Originally titled El cuarto pasajero, it was temporarily billed as "Blablacar", later recovering its original title. It was stylised as El Cu4rto Pasajero.) is a 2022 Spanish road romantic comedy film directed by Álex de la Iglesia, starring Alberto San Juan, Blanca Suárez, Ernesto Alterio and Rubén Cortada.

== Plot ==
In the wake of using a car-sharing mobile app to cope with his economic problems, Julián, a divorced man, meets Lorena, whom he begins to travel with to Madrid on a regular basis in his Volvo XC60, falling romantically for her. He is about to open up his feelings in one of those travels, but the situation takes an unexpected turn because of the selection of the rest of passengers.

== Cast ==
- Alberto San Juan as Julián
- Blanca Suárez as Lorena
- Ernesto Alterio as Juan Carlos
- Rubén Cortada as Sergio
- Carlos Areces
- Jaime Ordóñez
- Enrique Villén

== Production ==
Jorge Guerricaechevarría took over co-writing duties alongside director Álex de la Iglesia. Rita Noriega was charged with the direction of photography. The film is a Telecinco Cinema, Pokeepsie Films and Te Has Venido Arriba AIE production and it had the participation of Mediaset España, Movistar+ and Mediterráneo Mediaset España Group. Filming began on 25 January 2021. Shooting locations included Bilbao (marking De la Iglesia's film return to his native city after his feature debut Acción mutante), Álava, La Rioja, and Madrid. The production was temporarily halted due to a COVID-19 positive test.

== Release ==
Distributed by Sony Pictures Entertainment Iberia S.L.U., the film was set for a 4 November 2022 theatrical release date in Spain, then rescheduled to 28 October. It was the largest opening of the weekend (and it made the second-largest gross overall after Black Adam). It had an in-year gross of €4.3 million.

== Reception ==
Raquel Hernández Luján of HobbyConsolas rated the film with 78 points ("good"), deeming it to be a "funny, surprising and at times even delirious" comedy, as well as an "anti-buddy movie that makes you laugh", highlighting the character design, the plot twists and the full commitment to their roles on the part of the two "immense" San Juan and Alterio as the best things about the film, while citing certain "trite" elements pertaining the romantic comedy subplot as a negative point.

Fausto Fernández of Fotogramas rated the film 4 out of 5 stars highlighting the duel held between San Juan and Alterio, "worthy of The Hitcher... or Planes, Trains and Automobiles" as the film's standout.

Miguel Ángel Romero of Cinemanía rated the film 2 out of 5 stars deeming it to be an "endless and fun trip in BlaBlaCar, [yet] too trite".

Sergi Sánchez of La Razón rated the film 3 out of 5 stars, highlighting the reformulation of the romcom genre under a road movie structure (which manages to "work and entertain") as the best thing about the film, while dismissing the fiction taking place in a hotel, slowing down the pace, as the worst thing about it.

== Accolades ==
Year	Award	Category	Nominee(s)	Result	Ref.
2023	10th Feroz Awards	Best Comedy Film		Nominated	
2023	78th CEC Medals	Best Music	Roque Baños	Nominated	

== See also ==
- List of Spanish films of 2022
