= Flavio Labiano =

Spanish cinematographer (born 1962)

Flavio Martínez Labiano (born 1962) is a Spanish cinematographer.

== Early life ==
Labiano was born in San Sebastián in 1962.

He studied at the American Film Institute.

He was nominated to the Goya Award for Best Cinematography for his work in The Day of the Beast.

== Filmography ==
Short film

Year	Title	Director
1985	Shh...	Santiago Aguilar; Luis Guridi
1985	Pez	Santiago Aguilar; Luis Guridi; Raúl Barbé
1987	Tarta-Tarta-Hey	Santiago Aguilar; Luis Guridi; Raúl Barbé
1990	La hija de Fu Manchú '72	Santiago Aguilar; Luis Guridi; Raúl Barbé
2023	Behold	Ridley Scott

Television

Year	Title	Director	Notes
1989	Delirios de amor	Eva Lesmes	Episode "El escritor de escritores"
2000	Harlan County War	Tony Bill	TV movie

Documentary film

Year	Title	Director	Notes
1989	Foreign Filmmakers in Hollywood	Elías Nahmías	With Michael Spicer

Feature film

Year	Title	Director	Ref.
1991	Uncaged	Lisa Hunt	
1993	Urte ilunak	Arantxa Lazkano	
1994	My Soul Brother	Mariano Barroso	
1994	Souvenir	Rosa Vergés	
1994	Justino, un asesino de la tercera edad	Santiago Aguilar; Luis Guridi	
1995	The Day of the Beast	Álex de la Iglesia	
1996	Éxtasis	Mariano Barroso	
1996	Matías, juez de línea	Santiago Aguilar; Luis Guridi	
1996	Katuwira	Íñigo Vallejo-Nágera	
1997	Perdita Durango	Álex de la Iglesia	
1998	The Naked Eye	Vicente Aranda	
1998	Atilano for President	Santiago Aguilar; Luis Guridi	
1999	Dying of Laughter	Álex de la Iglesia	
2001	Bones	Ernest Dickerson	
2002	800 Bullets	Álex de la Iglesia	
2007	Goal II: Living the Dream	Jaume Collet-Serra	
2007	Timecrimes	Nacho Vigalondo	
2011	Unknown	Jaume Collet-Serra	
2014	Non-Stop	Jaume Collet-Serra	
2015	The Gunman	Pierre Morel	
2016	The Shallows	Jaume Collet-Serra	
2017	The Invisible Guardian	Fernando González Molina	
2017	Kidnap	Luis Prieto	
2020	Horizon Line	Mikael Marcimain	
2021	Jungle Cruise	Jaume Collet-Serra	
2023	Retribution	Nimród Antal	
2024	The Killer's Game	J. J. Perry	
2027	Cliffhanger	Jaume Collet-Serra	
