= Cosimo Fusco =

Italian actor (born 1962)

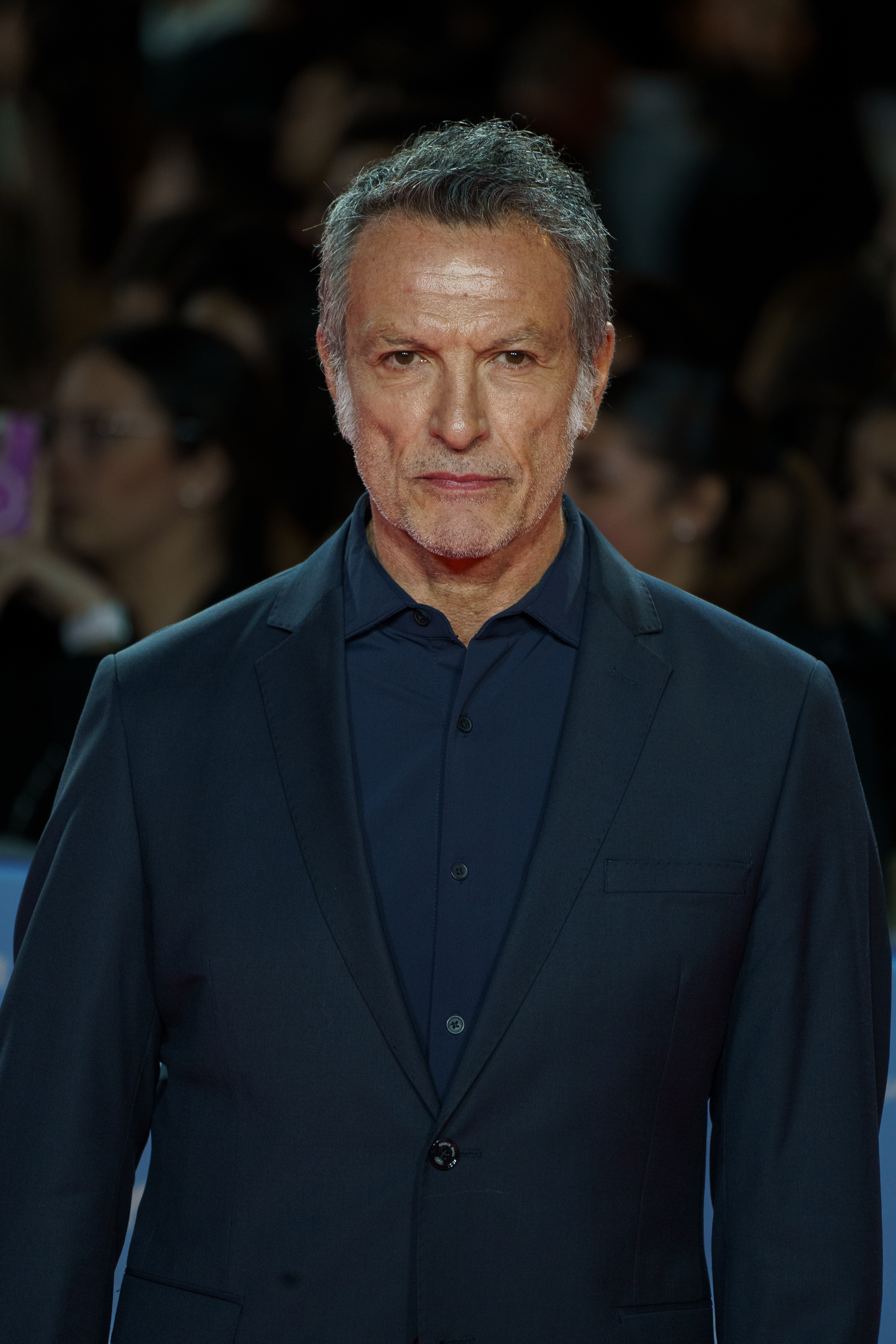
- Fusco in 2025
- Born: Cosimo Massimo Fusco; 23 September 1962 (age 62); Matera, Italy
- Occupation: Actor
- Years active: 1986–present

Cosimo Massimo Fusco (born 23 September 1962) is an Italian actor.

== Biography ==
Born in Matera, Italy, Fusco was educated in Los Angeles, Rome, and Paris. In the United States, he is best known for his role as Paolo, one of Rachel's boyfriends in the American sitcom Friends. He has had roles in several Italian, German, and American productions, including the films Gone in 60 Seconds, Coco Chanel, Angels & Demons, and The Man Who Invented Christmas. He has appeared in the shows Alias, La piovra, and The Mentalist, among others. He played the role of Judge Alberto Somaschi in the Italian series Il bene e il male from 2008 to 2009.

== Selected filmography ==
=== Film ===
List of film appearances, with year, title, and role shown
Year	Title	Role	Director(s)	Notes
1988	Domino	Unknown	Ivana Massetti	
1991	Rossini! Rossini!	Franco	Mario Monicelli	
1997	The Eighteenth Angel	Florian	William Bindley	
1999	The Wasteland	Santino	Fabio Segatori	
2000	Gone in Sixty Seconds	Adjacent mechanic	Dominic Sena	
2004	The Card Player	Berardelli	Dario Argento	
2005	The Third Star	Boss	Alberto Ferrari	
2005	Door of the Seven Stars	Unknown	Pasquale Pozzessere	
2005	Italia's War	Franco	Ahmed Saleh	
2006	Love & Freedom: Masaniello	Salvatore	Angelo Antonucci	
2007	Mineurs	Rocco Basile	Fulvio Wetzl	
2007	Short Cutter!	Roldano	Pierfrancesco Campanella	Short film
2009	Angels & Demons	Archbishop Simeon	Ron Howard	
2009	Butterfly Zone	Erminio Zecca	Luciano Capponi	
2010	Viola	Sean Miller	Travis Andrade	Short film
2012	Berberian Sound Studio	Francesco Coraggio	Peter Strickland	
2013	Dante's Hell Animated	Chiron	Boris Acosta	Voice; short film
2017	The Man Who Invented Christmas	Giuseppe Mazzini	Bharat Nalluri	
2018	7 Miracles	Head of Pharisees	Rodrigo Cerqueira & Marco Spagnoli	VR short
2019	Spiral Farm	Maurizio	Alec Tibaldi	
2019	Lucania	Arrabal	Gigi Roccati	
2019	The Tracker	Giordano	Giorgio Serafini	
2020	Thou Shalt Not Hate	Sig. Segre, Simone's father	Mauro Mancini	
2021	Venicephrenia	Plague doctor / Bufón	Álex de la Iglesia	

=== Television ===
List of television appearances, with year, title, and role shown
Year	Title	Role	Director(s)	Notes
1990	La piovra, season 5	Grillo		4 episodes
1990	Voyage of Terror: The Achille Lauro Affair			TV movie
1994–95	Friends	Paolo	NBC	4 episodes
1998	Una donna per amico	Bruno Montemauro	Rai 1	8 episodes
2001	Don Matteo		Rai 1	
2001	Alias	Logan Gerace	NBC	1 episode
2002	Valeria medico legale		Canale 5	1 episode
2005	Utta Danella	Marco		1 episode
2005	Imperium: Saint Peter		Television movie	
2007	Rome	Hannibal Cotta / Hanibal Cotta	HBO; BBC; Rai Fiction	4 episodes
2007	Io e mamma	Cesare Prugnoli		Miniseries
2008	Ho sposato uno sbirro			Episode: "La Venere scomparsa"
2008	Coco Chanel	Albert		Television movie
2009	Il bene e il male	Judge Alberto Somaschi		11 episodes
2009	Moana	Padre di Moana	Sky Cinema	
2009	Il falco e la colomba	Monaco Colonna		6 episodes
2009	Boris		Fox International Channels Italy	2 episodes
2012	The Mentalist	Guy Duval	CBS	Episode: "Red Is the New Black"
2017	1993	PM Rattazzi	Sky Atlantic; Sky Cinema	1 episode
2020–21	30 Coins	Angelo	HBO Europe	6 episodes

=== Music videos ===
List of music video appearances, with year, title, and role shown
Year	Title	Role	Director(s)	Notes
2016	"Ballad for a Lifer"	Lifer	Nidi d'Arac	Also director, writer & producer
