= Payasos en la lavadora =

- First edition
- Author: Álex de la Iglesia
- Language: Spanish
- Genre: Satirical novel
- Publisher: Planeta
- Publication date: 1997
- Publication place: Spain
- Media type: Print (hardback)
- ISBN: 84-08-02080-3
- OCLC: 38288850
- LC Class: PQ6659.G425 P39 1997

Payasos en la lavadora (Clowns in the Washing Machine) is a humorous novel written in Spanish by the Spanish Basque film maker Álex de la Iglesia in 1997. It tells the experiences of a bohemian writer during Bilbao's Main Week fiestas.

== Plot summary ==
Álex de la Iglesia signs only two pages of this novel. In this introduction he states he has found a laptop computer lost by the poet Juan Carlos Satrústegui. On it, he has read a file called Payasos en la lavadora. Since Satrústegui has entered a mental sanatorium, de la Iglesia talks with the writer's mother and decides to publish the text after correcting it. It is a parody of the old literary technique of the false document found by chance, probably influenced by the fact that, in real life, de la Iglesia writes his film scripts on a laptop computer, which he has lost at least twice.

According to this introduction, the rest of the fifteen chapters are Juan Carlos Satrústegui's autobiographical tale. Satrústegui considers himself a genius, superior to all those he comes across. But the reader soon realises his psychic problems (obsessions, deliria, paranoia, lack of empathy) become worse due to the drugs he uses in fiestas, the want of slept and the beatings he earns when dealing with the lumpen.

== Allusions/references to other works ==
The novel is full of references to popular culture (the very title is about a Spanish TV commercial advertisement for machine soap) and philosophy, with strong contrasts between a literary and grandiloquent language and a rude and crude one, depending on Satrústegui's unstable moods.
