= The Day of the Beast =

- Theatrical release poster by Oscar Mariné
- Spanish: El día de la bestia
- Directed by: Álex de la Iglesia
- Written by: Jorge Guerricaechevarría; Álex de la Iglesia
- Produced by: Andrés Vicente Gómez
- Starring: Álex Angulo; Armando De Razza; Santiago Segura; Terele Pávez; Nathalie Seseña; Maria Grazia Cucinotta; Saturnino García
- Cinematography: Flavio Martínez Labiano
- Edited by: Teresa Font
- Music by: Battista Lena
- Production companies: Sogetel; Iberoamericana Films; M.G. S.R.L.
- Release date: 20 October 1995 (Spain)
- Running time: 103 minutes
- Countries: Spain; Italy
- Language: Spanish
- Budget: 300 million ₧
- Box office: €4,367,321

The Day of the Beast (Spanish: El día de la bestia) is a 1995 black comedy (Note: Spanish-based critics usually place the film within national traditions of black comedy.) film co-written and directed by Álex de la Iglesia and starring Álex Angulo, Armando De Razza and Santiago Segura. It is a Spanish-Italian co-production.

The plot concerns the unorthodox attempts of a Basque priest (Angulo) to avert the birth of the Antichrist in Madrid during Christmas Eve, teaming up with a metalhead (Segura) and an occult fraudster (De Razza). The film, marketed as "a satanic comedy", was well received by critics and audiences in Spain, and sparked interest in the director's filmography and style of directing.

It earned numerous accolades, including the Goya Award for Best Director for Álex de la Iglesia.

== Plot ==
Ángel Berriatúa, a Basque priest and professor of theology, confesses to another priest that he intends to commit as much evil as he can. The other priest is shocked until Ángel whispers his reasoning. When the other priest agrees to help him, a large cross falls and crushes him.

Ángel goes into downtown Madrid, committing various sins and crimes such as taking money from a homeless man, pushing a street performer over, and telling a dying man to go to Hell and stealing his wallet. He goes to a record store and meets José María, a self-described Satanist and heavy metal fan from Carabanchel, who gives him a tape of the most "evil" band he can think of. José María puts Ángel up in his mother's boarding house where he lives with his mother, grandfather, and Mina, a woman he is attracted to who helps his mother with the business. Ángel then attempts to steal a book written by occult TV show host Professor Cavan, convinced it can tell him how to sell his soul to Satan, believing that a secret code in the Bible says that the Antichrist will be born at midnight on Christmas Eve. He intends to sell his soul before the night is out to get into the birth ceremony and kill the Antichrist. The store manager does not believe him and he flees.

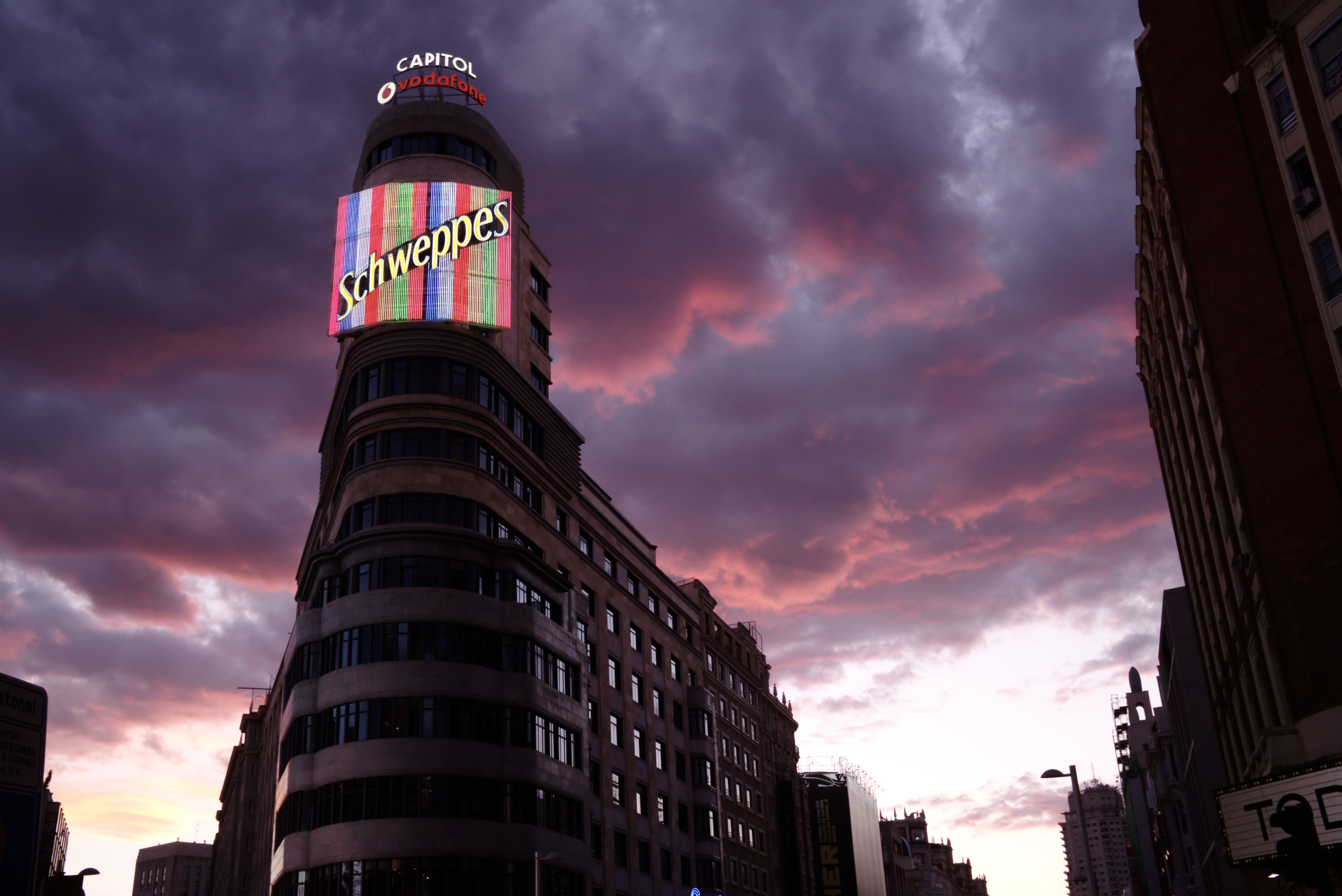
The neon Schweppes sign where José María hangs from is on the Edificio Carrión.

Ángel and José María team up to kidnap and tie up Cavan, who they intimidate into telling them how to complete the ritual, which requires the blood of a virgin. Ángel first tries to get it from Cavan's girlfriend Susana, but after knocking her out by mistake, Cavan admits that she is not a virgin. Ángel then goes back to the boarding house to try with Mina but José María's mother sees him and tries to kill him with a shotgun. Ángel escapes with some of Mina's blood, but accidentally kills José María's mother. Ángel, José María, and Cavan are able to burn a piece of paper, take LSD, and complete the ritual, which Cavan believes is made up. However, a he-goat appears in the room and then disappears. Ángel then finds a message in the burnt scraps of paper in which the devil taunts him, not fooled by Ángel's actions. Ángel, José María, and Cavan flee the apartment when the police arrive on suspicion of Cavan's kidnapping.

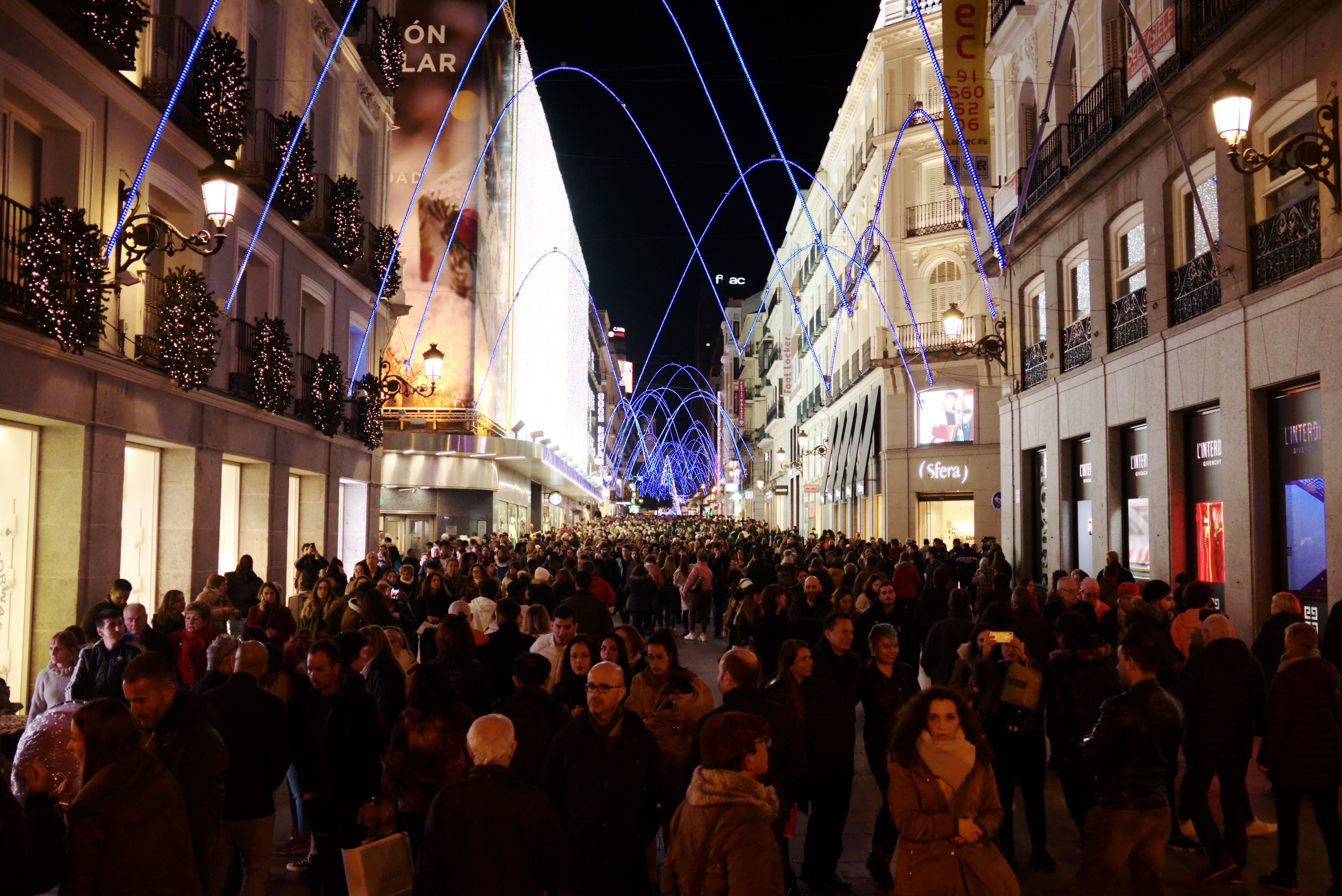
De la Iglesia stages a shooting in Calle Preciados, a commercial street in Madrid, specially crowded during Christmas.

Ángel and José María frantically drive around town looking for a sign to point Ángel in the right direction. Ángel first tries to get the information on the birth of the Antichrist out of a man giving a speech about the predictions of Nostradamus, resulting in a chase in which three men dressed as the Three Wise Men are shot by police by mistake. He then tries to find the information at a heavy metal show, but is beaten up by the attendees. Cavan goes on television and asks Ángel to call him, telling him that he's realized Ángel was right and he knows where the birth of the Antichrist will be.

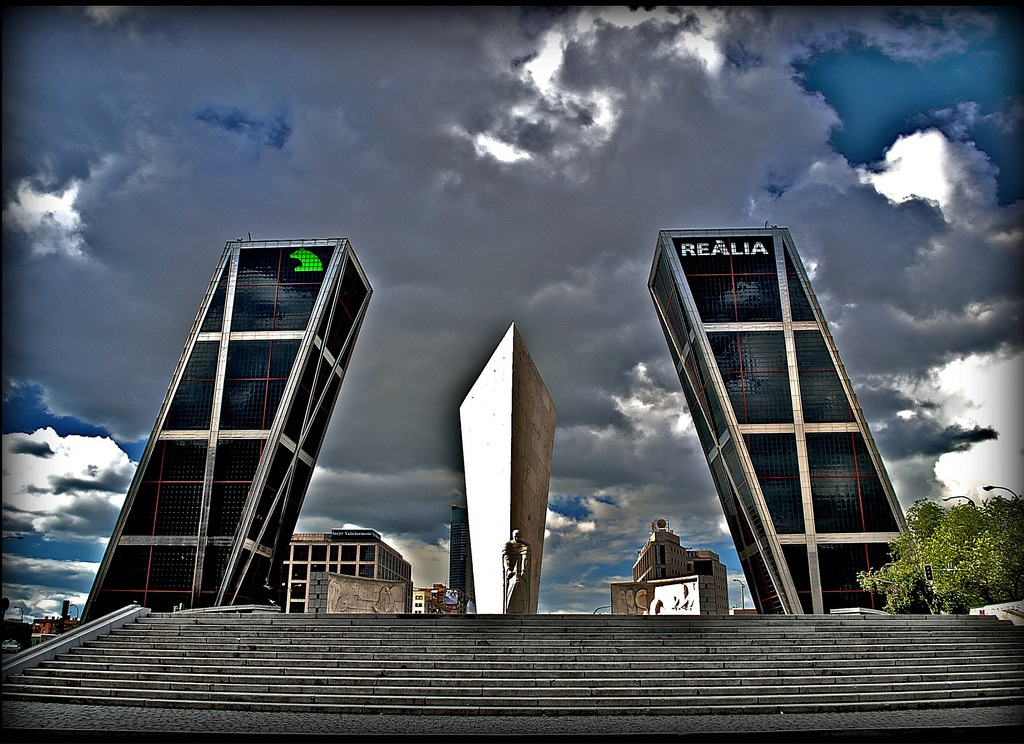
The Gate of Europe are the inclined buildings where the final fight happens.

Cavan points out that the devil uses his own markings, similar yet opposite to the Christian cross, in order to mock God, and points them toward a pair of buildings in the same shape of the devil's mark: the Gate of Europe. The three men engage in a fight with an extreme-right gang that has holed up there and has been seen throughout the film murdering homeless people and spray painting Limpia Madrid (transl. clean up Madrid) everywhere. Their leader is revealed as the devil when he throws José María off the building to his death. The gang beats Cavan badly, but Ángel gets hold of a gun and kills the gang, which was also killing a baby who is the Antichrist. He then shoots the devil as well.

Some time later, another actor takes over Cavan's show, and Ángel and Cavan become homeless drifters; while Cavan constantly complains that they will never be able to tell anyone how they saved the world, Ángel simply misses José María, but has accepted the events as the duo's fate.

== Cast ==
- Álex Angulo as Father Ángel Berriartúa
- Armando De Razza as Professor Cavan
- Santiago Segura as José María
- Terele Pávez as Rosario
- Nathalie Seseña as Mina
- Maria Grazia Cucinotta as Susana
- Jaime Blanch
- Antonio Dechent
- Saturnino García
- Ramón Agirre
- El Gran Wyoming
- Jimmy Barnatán, as possessed child

== Production ==
A Spanish-Italian 80%–20% co-production, the film was produced by Andrés Vicente Gómez' Iberoamericana Films Producción alongside Sogetel and M.G. S.R.L in collaboration with Sogepaq and Canal Plus España. It had a 300 million ₧ budget. A soundtrack for the film was released in Spain and Korea. It featured bands such as Ministry, HeadCrash, Pantera, Sugar Ray, and Def Con Dos.

== Release ==
The film opened in Spanish theatres on 20 October 1995. It grossed €4,367,321.

== Reception ==
In a retrospective review of the film for Popoptiq, reviewer Ricky D. wrote, "Delirious, demented and diabolically funny, The Day of the Beast is essential viewing."

In a retrospective review for Daily Grindhouse, reviewer Johnny Donaldson wrote that The Day of the Beast "may not exactly be a traditional Christmas movie, even by the standards of the horror genre, but it's a perfect one for those who want to thumb their noses at the 'Christ' part of Christmas."

== Accolades ==
Year	Award	Category	Nominee(s)	Result	Ref.
1996	10th Goya Awards	Best Film	Sogetel, Iberoamericana Films, M.G. S.R.L.	Nominated	
1996	10th Goya Awards	Best Director	Álex de la Iglesia	Won	
1996	10th Goya Awards	Best Actor	Álex Angulo	Nominated	
1996	10th Goya Awards	Best Original Screenplay	Jorge Guerricaechevarría, Álex de la Iglesia	Nominated	
1996	10th Goya Awards	New Actor	Santiago Segura	Won	
1996	10th Goya Awards	Best Art Direction	Arturo García "Biafra", José Luis Arrizabalaga	Won	
1996	10th Goya Awards	Best Cinematography	Flavio Martínez Labiano	Nominated	
1996	10th Goya Awards	Best Editing	Teresa Font	Nominated	
1996	10th Goya Awards	Best Production Supervision	Carmen Martínez	Nominated	
1996	10th Goya Awards	Best Original Score	Battista Lena	Nominated	
1996	10th Goya Awards	Best Sound	Carlos Garrido, Gilles Ortion, José Antonio Bermúdez, Miguel Rejas, Ray Gillon	Won	
1996	10th Goya Awards	Best Makeup and Hairstyles	José Antonio Sánchez, José Quetglás, Mercedes Guillot	Won	
1996	10th Goya Awards	Best Special Effects	Juan Tomicic, Manuel Horrillo, Reyes Abades	Won	
1996	10th Goya Awards	Best Costume Design	Estíbaliz Markiegi	Nominated	

== See also ==
- List of Spanish films of 1995

== Bibliography ==
- Buse, Peter; Triana Toribio, Núria; Willis, Andy (2007). The cinema of Álex de la Iglesia. Manchester University Press. ISBN 978-0-7190-7136-2.
