= Messi (2014 film) =

- Theatrical release poster
- Directed by: Álex de la Iglesia
- Written by: Jorge Valdano; Jorge Valdano Sáenz de Ugarte
- Produced by: Jaume Roures
- Starring: Lionel Messi; Andrés Iniesta; Gerard Piqué; Jorge Valdano; Johan Cruyff; César Luis Menotti; Jamal Mahdi Alhusseiny
- Cinematography: Kiko de la Rica
- Edited by: Domingo González
- Music by: Joan Valent
- Production company: Mediapro
- Distributed by: Warner Bros. Pictures
- Release dates: 27 August 2014 (Venice Film Festival); 1 January 2015
- Running time: 93 minutes
- Languages: Spanish; English (subtitles)
- Budget: €3 million
- Box office: $33,607

Messi is a 2014 documentary film directed by Álex de la Iglesia. The film explores the rise of Argentine football player Lionel Messi who, at the time of the film's release, played for FC Barcelona.

== Production ==
The film focuses on Argentine footballer Lionel Messi, from his youth in Rosario to becoming one of the world's greatest players at FC Barcelona, and features Jorge Valdano discussing the qualities of Messi with Barcelona legend Johan Cruyff and former Argentina manager César Luis Menotti. In making the film, Iglesia said he was influenced by Orson Welles' Citizen Kane and Woody Allen's Broadway Danny Rose. The film was produced by Mediapro and distributed by Warner Bros. Pictures.

== Reception ==
After the film's premiere during the Venice Film Festival in 2014, Andrew Barker of Variety wrote that "the film is well shot and very briskly edited" and praised the choice to include figures throughout Messi's career and to not include Messi himself, but complained that they "never interact in particularly interesting ways" and also highlighted the lack of insight into his character.

== See also ==
- List of association football films
