= My Big Night =

- Theatrical release poster
- Spanish: Mi gran noche
- Directed by: Álex de la Iglesia
- Written by: Álex de la Iglesia; Jorge Guerricaechevarría
- Produced by: Enrique Cerezo
- Starring: Raphael; Mario Casas; Blanca Suárez; Pepón Nieto
- Cinematography: Ángel Amorós
- Music by: Joan Valent
- Production companies: Enrique Cerezo PC; Telefónica Studios
- Distributed by: Universal Pictures
- Release dates: 11 September 2015 (TIFF); 23 October 2015 (Spain)
- Running time: 100 minutes
- Country: Spain
- Language: Spanish
- Budget: €4 million
- Box office: €11.8 million

My Big Night (Spanish: Mi gran noche) is a 2015 Spanish comedy film directed by Álex de la Iglesia, who also co-wrote it with Jorge Guerricaechevarría.

== Plot ==
José has been sent by the employment agency as an extra for the taping of a New Year's Eve television special (four months in advance) in an industrial pavilion just outside Madrid, leaving his mother Dolores (an old woman unable to detach herself from a big crucifix she tore from her husband's grave) alone. He is replacing another extra who died in the wake of an accident involving a production crane during a rehearsal. Hundreds of people like him are locked in the set, replaying rehearsal after rehearsal, applauding for musical performances they do not actually see and celebrating the false arrival of the new year. José starts to fall for dinner companion Paloma (a jinxed woman) to the amusement of the rest of extras sharing the table (Antonio, Yanire, and Josua). Meanwhile major clashes of egos are unfolding backstage.

On the one hand, veteran (and ruthless) crooner Alphonso comes face to face with his bitter rival, Latin pop young sensation Adanne as Alphonso is not willing to let anyone else than him to come out at the top. Yuri, Alphonso's presumed adopted son and primary target of his cruelty, has hired an assassin (Óscar) to get rid of Alphonso. A purported fan has managed to get a vial with Adanne's semen so he can be blackmailed. On the other hand, the two co-hosts of the show and an actual dysfunctional couple (Roberto and Cristina) cannot stand each other and fight over the trust of the producer Benítez, who is aware the channel is struggling to avoid its closure. Meanwhile a mobile control unit formed by Rosa and Amparo stays aloof trying to save the insane television shoot.

== Cast ==
- Raphael as Alphonso
- Mario Casas as Adanne
- Pepón Nieto as José
- Blanca Suárez as Paloma
- Hugo Silva as Roberto
- Carlos Areces as Yuri
- Jaime Ordóñez as Óscar García
- Luis Callejo as regidor
- Carolina Bang as Cristina
- Carmen Machi as Rosa
- Carmen Ruiz as Amparo
- Santiago Segura as Benítez
- Enrique Villén as Soriano
- Antonio Velázquez as Antonio
- Terele Pávez as Dolores
- Ana Polvorosa as Yanire
- Luis Fernández as Josua
- Eduardo Casanova as maquillador
- Marta Castellote as Lourdes
- Tomás Pozzi as Perotti

== Production ==
A Enrique Cerezo PC and Telefónica Studios production, the film had the participation of TVE and Canal+ and support from ICAA.

== Release ==
The film's world premiere was at the 40th Toronto International Film Festival in September 2015. Distributed by Universal Pictures, the film was theatrically released in Spain on 23 October 2015.

== Accolades ==
Awards	Category	Nominated	Result
3rd Feroz Awards	Best Comedy Film		Nominated
3rd Feroz Awards	Best Supporting Actor	Mario Casas	Won
3rd Feroz Awards	Best Supporting Actress	Blanca Suárez	Nominated
3rd Feroz Awards	Best Trailer		Nominated
30th Goya Awards	Best Art Direction	Arturo García "Biaffra" and José Luis Arrizabalaga "Arri"	Nominated
30th Goya Awards	Best Sound	David Rodríguez, Nicolás de Poulpiquet and Sergio Bürmann	Nominated
30th Goya Awards	Best Special Effects	Curro Muñoz and Juan R. Molina	Nominated
30th Goya Awards	Best Costume Design	Paola Torres	Nominated

== See also ==
- List of films set around New Year
- List of Spanish films of 2015
