= Venicephrenia =

- Film poster
- Spanish: Veneciafrenia
- Directed by: Álex de la Iglesia
- Written by: Jorge Guerricaechevarría; Álex de la Iglesia
- Produced by: Carolina Bang; Álex de la Iglesia; Ignacio Salazar-Simpson; Ricardo Marco Budé
- Starring: Ingrid García Jonsson; Silvia Alonso; Goize Blanco; Nicolás lloro; Alberto Bang; Cosimo Fusco; Enrico Lo Verso; Armando di Razza; Chanel Cazzaniga; Caterina Murino; Nico Romero
- Cinematography: Pablo Rosso
- Edited by: Domingo González
- Music by: Roque Baños
- Production companies: Pokeepsie Films; The Fear Collection I AIE
- Distributed by: Sony Pictures Entertainment Iberia
- Release dates: 9 October 2021 (FICFC); 22 April 2022 (Spain)
- Running time: 100 minutes
- Country: Spain
- Languages: Spanish; Italian; English
- Box office: €441.000

Venicephrenia (Spanish: Veneciafrenia) is a 2021 Spanish slasher thriller film directed by Álex de la Iglesia. It is the first film belonging to the 'Fear Collection' label created by Sony Pictures International Productions and Pokeepsie Films in association with Amazon Prime Video. It stars Ingrid García Jonsson, Silvia Alonso, Goize Blanco, Nicolás Iloro and Alberto Bang as a group of Spanish friends who travel to Venice as part of a vacation plan, but as soon as they arrive to their destination, they encounter with furious inhabitants who refuse to welcome them, and a deadly killer who hunts each of them down.

Venicephrenia had its world premiere at Sitges Film Festival on 9 October 2021, with several more festival screenings following until it was released theatrically on Spain on 22 April 2022.

== Plot ==
A group of young Spanish tourists travel to Venice in order to have a good time, even though their inhabitants are not in a welcoming mood for tourists. Once there, they face the prospect of struggling to stay alive.

== Cast ==
- Ingrid García Jonsson as Isa, Jose's sister
- Silvia Alonso as Susana
- Goize Blanco as Arantza, Javi's girlfriend
- Nicolás lloro as Javi, Arantza's boyfriend
- Alberto Bang as Jose, Isa's brother
- Cosimo Fusco as Dottore, the killer jester
- Enrico Lo Verso as Giacomo
- Armando di Razza as Brunelli
- Caterina Murino as Claudia
- Nico Romero as Alfonso, Isa's husband

== Production ==
Veneciafrenia was written by Álex de la Iglesia alongside Jorge Guerricaechevarría. Produced by Pokeepsie Films and The Fear Collection AIE, in association with Sony Pictures International Productions and Prime Video and with the participation from Mogambo Films, the film was shot in between Madrid and Venice. Shooting began on 5 October 2020 and lasted for seven weeks.

== Release ==
The film made its world premiere at the 54th Sitges Film Festival (FICFC) on October 9, 2021. Tentatively slated for a wide theatrical release on November 26, 2021, in Spain, the domestic release date was finally rescheduled to April 22, 2022, due to the COVID-19 pandemic.

== Reception ==
On the review aggregator website Rotten Tomatoes, 75% of 8 critics' reviews are positive, with an average rating of 6.8/10.

Jesús Palacios of Fotogramas rated the film with 4 out of 5 stars, writing that it presents a "schizophrenic exercise in the love of evil, of villains torn between reason and irrational murderous madness, of scapegoats and moral and social dilemmas", praising its boldness while negatively pointing out at its "rather soft" ending.

Marta Medina of El Confidencial also gave it 4 out of 5 stars, considering that the film brings together almost all the obsessions hallmark to De la Iglesia's films.

Reviewing for Cinemanía, Miguel Ángel Romero gave it 4 out of 5 stars, underscoring Venicephrenia to be a story of "tourism-phobia and murder in a rundown Venice."

Oti Rodríguez Marchante of ABC scored 2 out of 5 stars, assessing that De la Iglesia and Guerricaechevarría managed that their story do not say much, which is what it is all about, and that its characters are tiresome and stupid enough that any violence inflicted on them becomes normal and bearable to the viewer.

Raquel Hernández Luján of HobbyConsolas scored 60 out of 100 points ('acceptable'), deeming the film to be an "imperfect slasher" displaying a message denouncing mass tourism that fails at making viewers empathise with the protagonists. She praised the opening credits and the transgressive elements blended with the carnival's imagery while considering the production issues not solved at the editing stage to be the worst about the film.

== See also ==
- List of Spanish films of 2022
