= Dying of Laughter =

- Spanish: Muertos de risa
- Directed by: Álex de la Iglesia
- Written by: Jorge Guerricaechevarría; Álex de la Iglesia
- Produced by: Andrés Vicente Gómez
- Starring: Santiago Segura; El Gran Wyoming; Álex Angulo
- Cinematography: Flavio Martínez Labiano
- Edited by: Teresa Font
- Music by: Roque Baños
- Production company: Lola Films
- Release date: 12 March 1999 (Spain)
- Running time: 113 minutes
- Country: Spain
- Language: Spanish
- Budget: 530 million ₧
- Box office: €6.3 million (Spain)

Dying of Laughter (Spanish: Muertos de risa) is a 1999 Spanish black comedy film co-written and directed by Álex de la Iglesia which stars Santiago Segura, El Gran Wyoming and Álex Angulo. The plot tracks the mishaps of a comedic duo formed by Nino and Bruno, who actually hate each other.

== Plot ==
Nino and Bruno are two comedians who first meet each other in an Andalusian nightclub during the waning days of the Franco regime. When they discover that the audience enjoys their humor as a duo, they decide to become a comedic pair and quickly rise to stardom. Beneath their success and adulation, however, the pair develop an acrimonious relationship with each other.

== Cast ==
- Santiago Segura as Nino
- El Gran Wyoming as Bruno
- Álex Angulo as Julián
- Carla Hidalgo as Laura
- Jesús Bonilla as military member in coup d'état
- María Asquerino as Nino's mother
- José María Íñigo as himself
- Uri Geller as himself
- Antonio Resines as himself
- Víctor Manuel as himself
- Massiel as herself
- Alfonso Lussón
- Ramón Barea

== Production ==
Produced by Lola Films and featuring the participation of Telecinco, the film had a budget of 350 million Spanish peseta (c. €3.2 million).

== Release ==
The film, which premiered on 12 March 1999 in Spain, grossed €6,299,097 at the Spanish box office, the second highest-grossing Spanish film of the year, behind All About My Mother.

== Awards and nominations ==
Year	Award	Category	Nominee(s)	Result	Ref.
2000	14th Goya Awards	Best Supporting Actor	Álex Angulo	Nominated	

== See also ==
- List of Spanish films of 1999

== Bibliography ==
- Buse, Peter; Triana Toribio, Núria; Willis, Andy (2007). The cinema of Álex de la Iglesia. Manchester and New York: Manchester University Press. ISBN 9780719071362.
