= Jorge Guerricaechevarría =

Spanish screenwriter

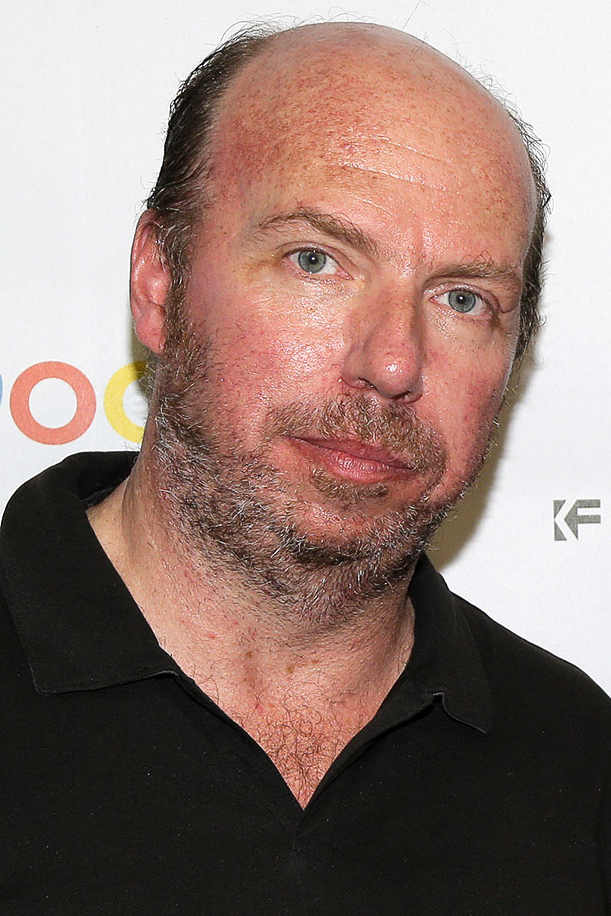
- Born: 10 July 1965 (age 61); Avilés, Spain
- Education: Universidad del País Vasco
- Occupation: Screenwriter

Jorge Guerricaechevarría (born 10 July, 1965), also known as "Guerrica", is a Spanish screenwriter. A regular co-screenwriter for Álex de la Iglesia's films, he has also been a recurring collaborator of Daniel Monzón.

He won a Goya Award for the script of Cell 211, adapted from the novel of the same name by Francisco Pérez Gandul. He was also nominated for The Day of the Beast, La comunidad, and The Oxford Murders. In 2008, at the Basque film festival Zinemastea, he received an honorary award recognizing his career as a screenwriter.

== Filmography ==
=== Film ===
Year	Title	Notes
1993	Acción mutante	Co-screenwriter with Alex de la Iglesia
1995	The Day of the Beast	Co-screenwriter with Alex de la Iglesia
1997	Live Flesh	Co-screenwriter with Pedro Almodovar and Ray Loriga
1997	Perdita Durango	Co-screenwriter with Barry Gifford, David Trueba and Alex De la Iglesia
1999	Muertos de risa	Co-screenwriter with Alex de la Iglesia
2000	La comunidad	Co-screenwriter with Alex de la Iglesia
2001	Luna's Game	Co-screenwriter with Monica Laguna
2002	They're Watching Us	Screenwriter
2002	The Biggest Robbery Never Told	Collaborating writer
2002	800 Bullets	Co-screenwriter with Alex de la Iglesia
2003	Platillos Volantes	Co-screenwriter with Óscar Aibar
2004	Crimen Ferpecto	Co-screenwriter with Alex De la Iglesia
2006	The Kovak Box	Co-screenwriter with Daniel Monzon
2008	The Oxford Murders	Co-screenwriter with Alex de la Iglesia
2009	Cell 211	Co-screenwriter with Daniel Monzon
2012	The End	Co-screenwriter with Sergio G. Sánchez
2013	Witching & Bitching	Co-screenwriter with Alex de la Iglesia
2014	El Niño	Co-screenwriter with Daniel Monzon
2014	Words with Gods	Segment "The Confession" Co-screenwriter with Alex de la Iglesia
2015	My Big Night	Co-screenwriter with Alex de la Iglesia
2016	To Steal from a Thief	Screenwriter
2017	The Bar	Co-screenwriter with Alex de la Iglesia
2017	Perfect Strangers	Co-screenwriter with Alex de la Iglesia
2018	Sara's Notebook	Screenwriter
2018	The Warning	Based on a screenplay by him
2018	Yucatán	Co-screenwriter with Daniel Monzon
2019	Eye for an Eye	Co-screenwriter with Juan Galiñanes
2020	Sky High	Screenwriter
2021	Outlaws	Co-Screenwriter with Daniel Monzon
2021	Veneciafrenia	Co-screenwriter with Alex De la Iglesia
2022	Código Emperador	Screenwriter
2022	El cuarto pasajero	Co-screenwriter with Alex De la Iglesia
2023	Sister Death	Co-screenwriter with Paco Plaza

=== Short film ===
Year	Title	Writer	Producer	Notes
1990	Mirindas Asesinas	Yes	Yes	Co-screenwriter with Alex de la Iglesia
2018	Una vez en la vida	Yes	No	Advertising short; Co-screenwriter with Alex de la Iglesia

=== Other work ===
Year	Title	Role
1993	Acción Mutante	Assistant to director, third assistant director and uncredited cameo role as "Minero en Bar"
1993	Kika	Assistant to director
1995	The Day of the Beast	Uncredited cameo role as "Trabajador Cadena TV"

=== Television ===
Year	Title	Writer	Creator	Notes
1995	Canguros	Yes	No	TV series; Writer 1 episode
1997	La casa de los líos	Yes	No	TV series; Writer 2 episodes/Story 1 episode
1998	Una de dos	Yes	No	TV series; Writer 1 episode
2006	The Baby's Room	Yes	No	TV movie; Co-screenwriter with Alex de la Iglesia
2009-2009	Pluto B.R.B Nero	Yes	Yes	TV series; Writer 16 episodes; co-creator with Alex de la Iglesia and Pepón Montero
2009	Psiquiatras, psicólogos y otros enfermos	Yes	No	TV movie
2011	Alakrana	Yes	No	TV Miniseries; 2 episodes
2020	Desparaecidos	No	Original; Idea	TV series; 13 episodes
2020-present	30 Coins	Yes	Yes	TV series; 16 episodes, co-creator and co-sceeenwriter with Alex de la Iglesia; Also executive producer
2023	Sky High	Yes	Yes	TV series; 7 episodes, co-creator with Daniel Calparsoro
2024	Clanes	Yes	Yes	TV Miniseries; 8 episodes
2024	1992	Yes	Yes	TV Miniseries; 6 episodes; co-creator and co-sceeenwriter with Alex de la Iglesia

== Awards and nominees ==
=== Premios Goya ===
Year	Category	Film	Result
2021	Best Adapted Screenplay	Las Leyes de la Frontera	Won
2016	Best Original Screenplay	Cien años de perdón	Nominated
2009	Best Adapted Screenplay	Cell 211	Won
2007	Best Adapted Screenplay	The Oxford Murders	Nominated
2000	Best Original Screenplay	La comunidad	Nominated
1995	Best Original Screenplay	The Day of the Beast	Nominated
