= RAC 105 TV =

Former Catalan television channel

- Country: Spain
- Broadcast area: Catalonia
- Headquarters: Barcelona

History
- Launched: 2008
- Closed: 2020

Links
- Website: www.rac105.cat

Availability

Terrestrial
- Digital: Mux 33 (Barcelona)

RAC 105 TV was a Catalan television channel, launched in 2008. It was founded and started to broadcast in 2008. RAC 105 TV was broadcast in Catalan.

On May 31, 2020, it ended its broadcasts to make way for Fibracat TV.
