= Pedraza, Segovia =

Pedraza
- Municipality
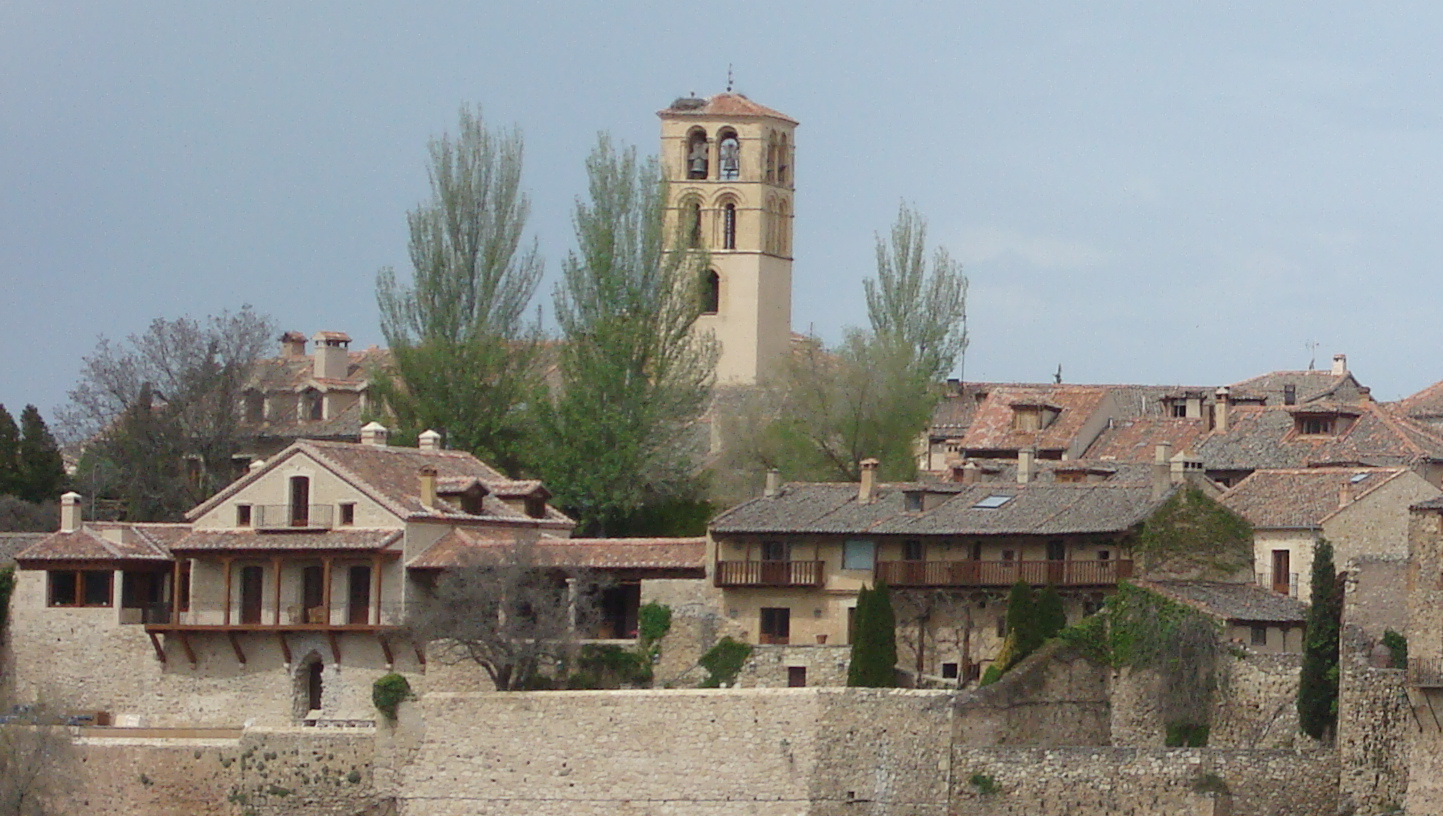

- Flag Coat of arms

- Location in Spain. Pedraza (Spain)
- Coordinates: 41°07′49″N 3°48′40″W
- Country: Spain
- Autonomous community: Castile and León
- Province: Segovia
- Comarca: Capital y Área Metropolitana
- Judicial district: Partido de Sepúlveda

Government
  - Alcalde: Pedro Martín Arcones

Area
  - Total: 31.58 km^{2} (12.19 sq mi)
- Elevation: 1,068 m (3,504 ft)

Population (2025-01-01)
  - Total: 335
  - Density: 10.6/km^{2} (27.5/sq mi)
- Demonym(s): Pedrazano, na
- Time zone: UTC+1 (CET)
  - Summer (DST): UTC+2 (CEST)
- Official language(s): Spanish
- Website: Official website

Spanish Cultural Heritage
- Type: Non-movable
- Criteria: Historic ensemble
- Designated: 30 March 1951
- Reference no.: RI-53-0000019

Pedraza is a municipality in Spain, located in the province of Segovia in the autonomous community of Castile and León. It is located at 37 km northeast of the city of Segovia with a population of less than 500.

Every year in July, Pedraza holds the Concierto de las Velas festival during La Noche de las Velas. Residents of the town and surrounding cities light candles along the streets and residences. In the city center multiple concerts are held featuring varying types of Spanish classical music. See La Noche de las Velas (in Spanish).

== Gallery ==
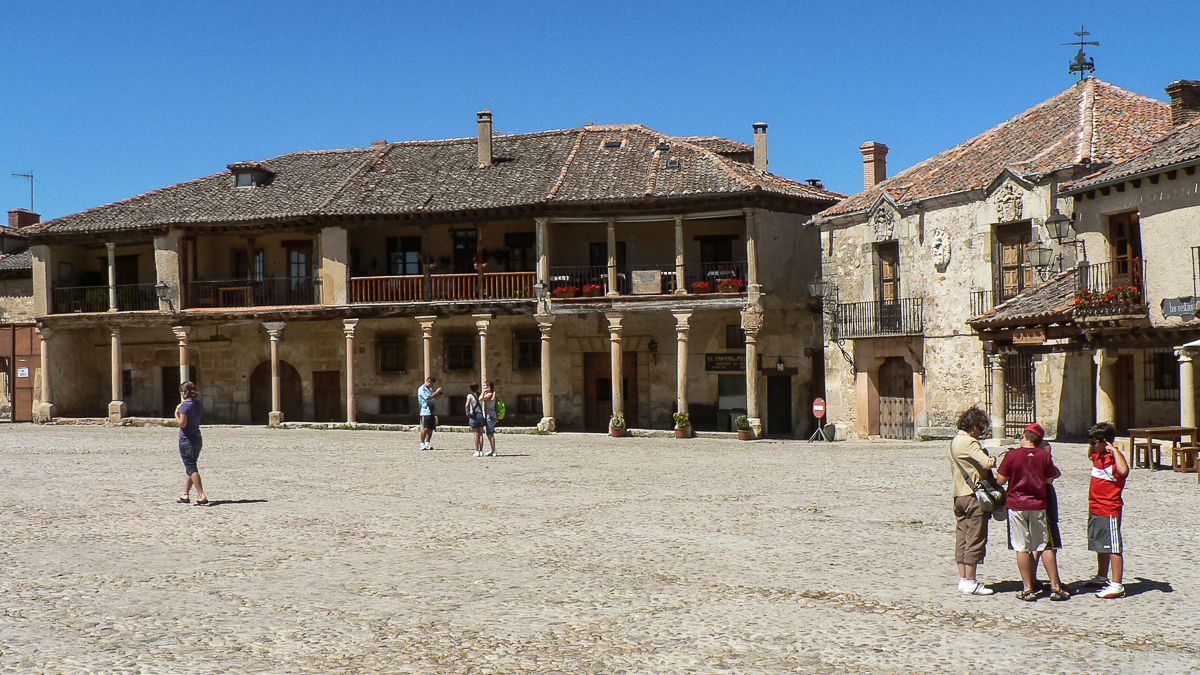
Pedraza main square

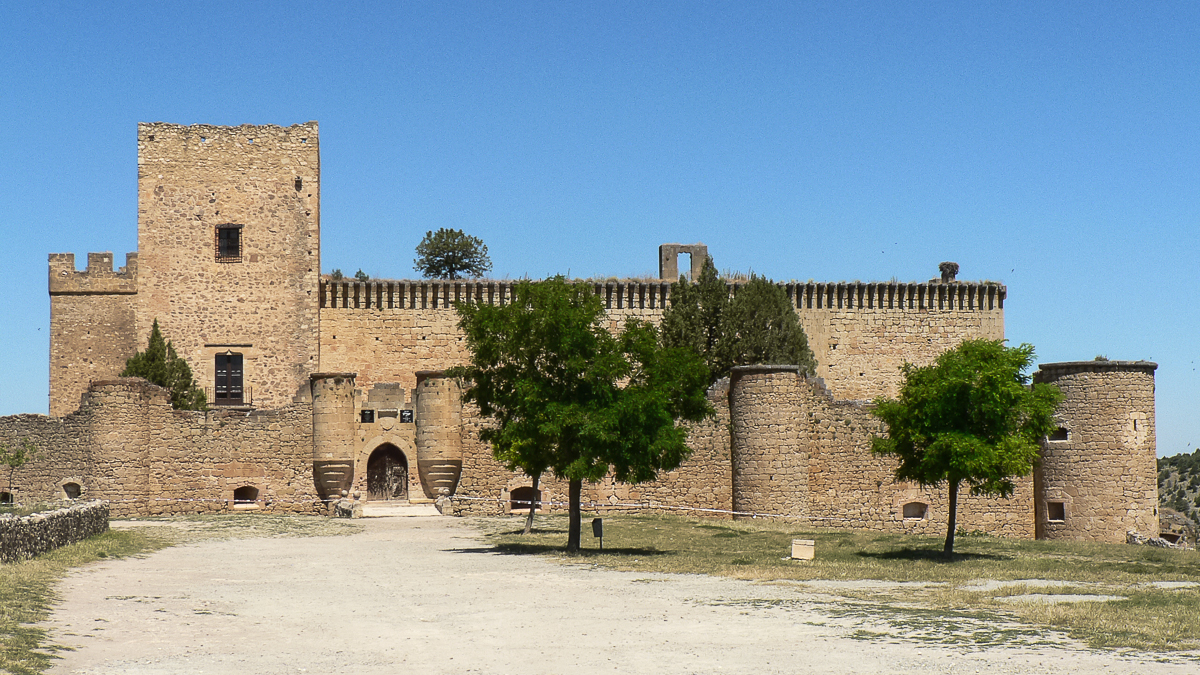
Pedraza Castle

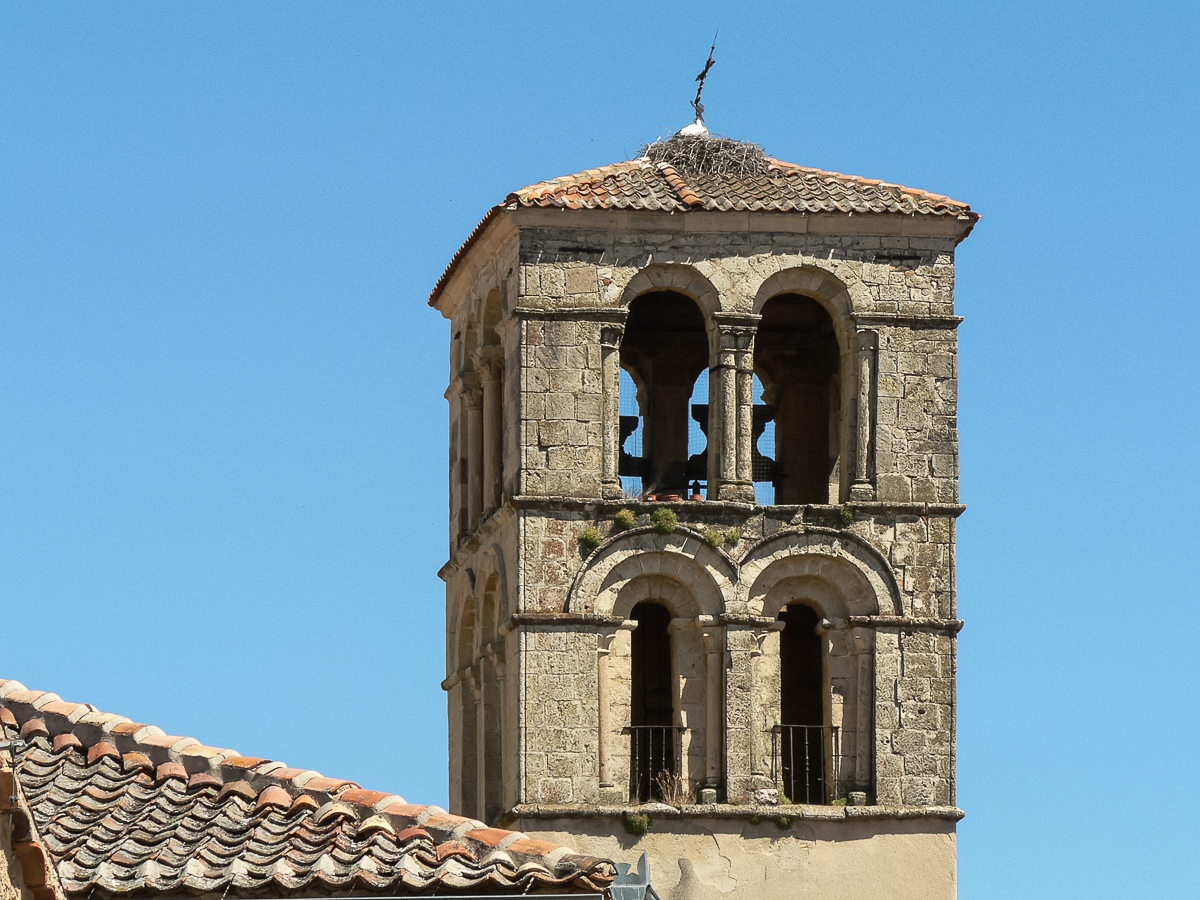
San Juan church

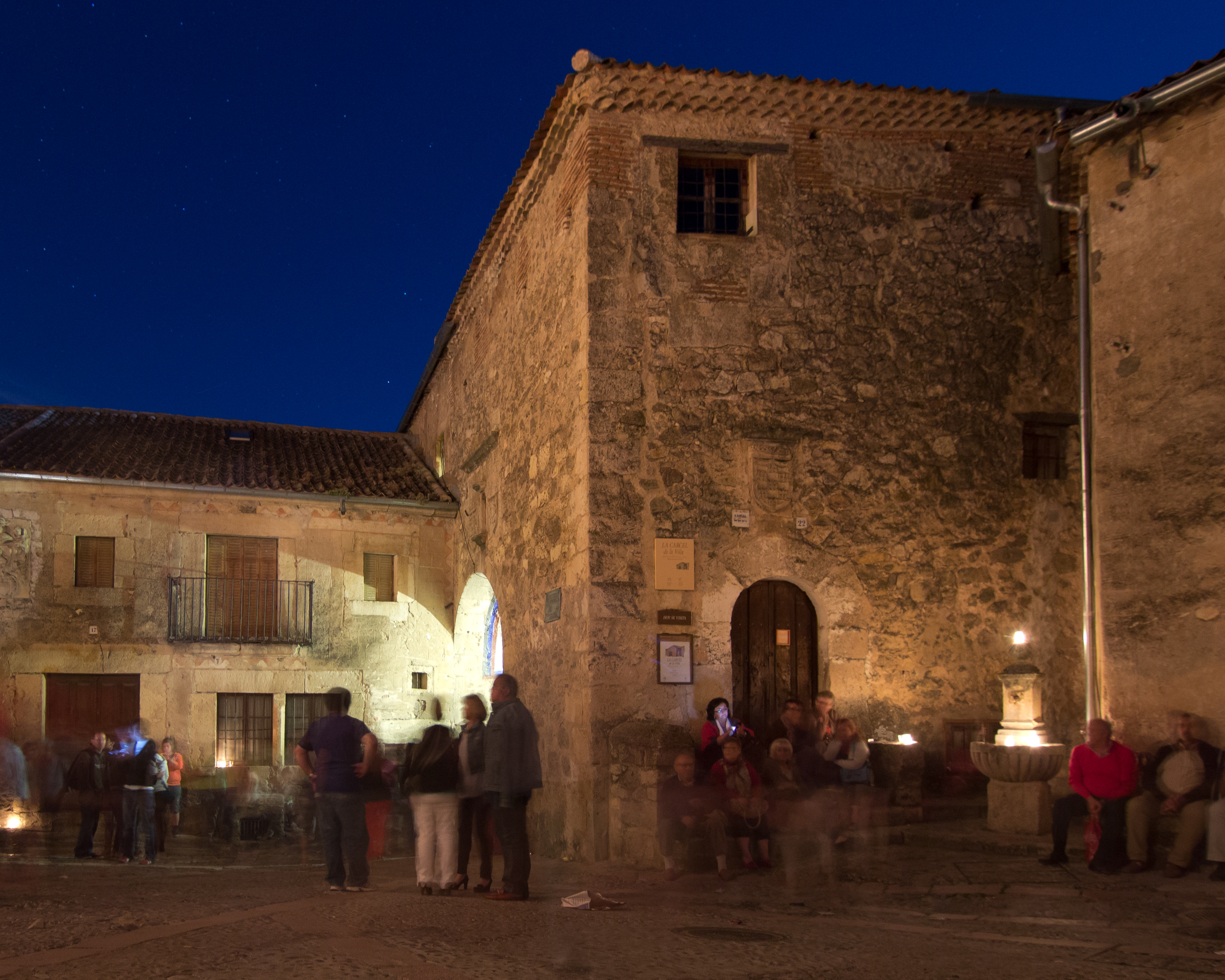
Pedraza streets at night

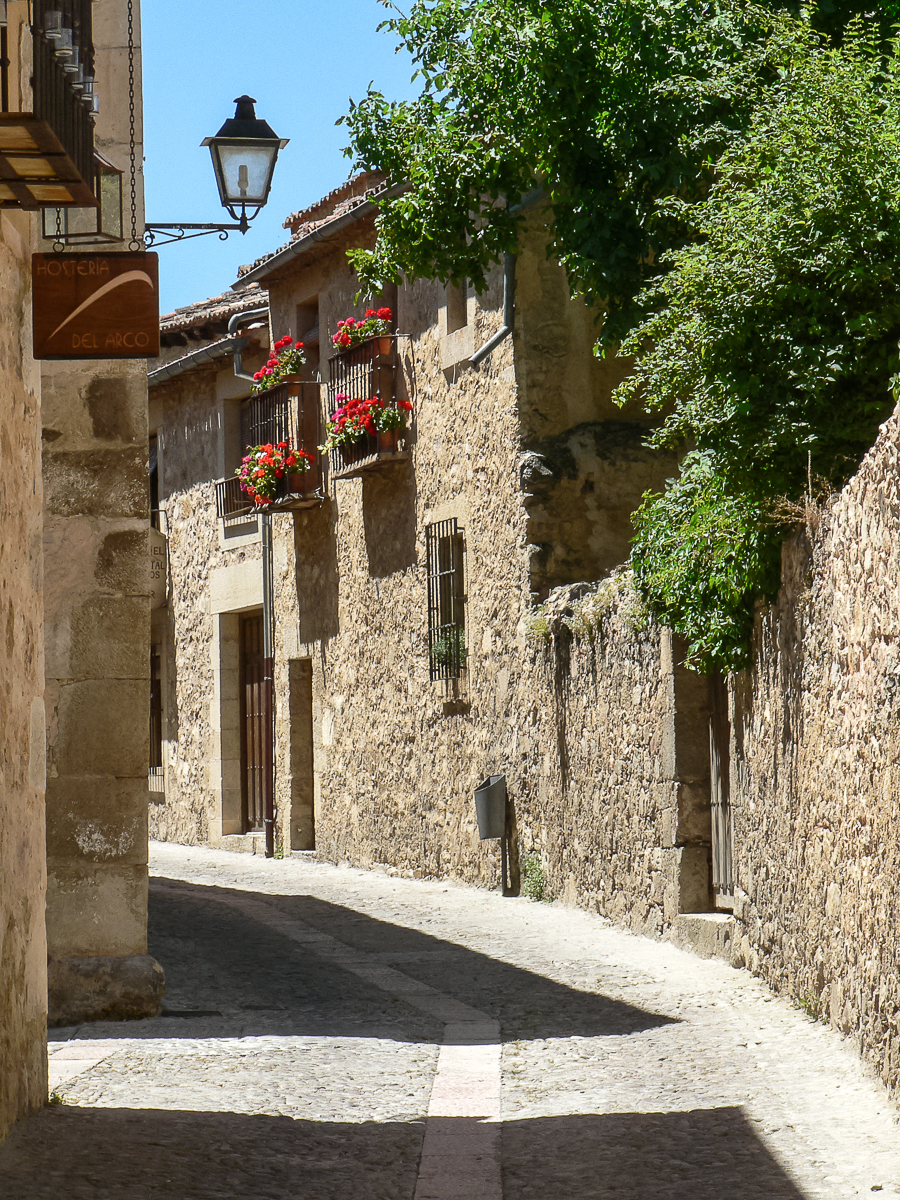
Street in Pedraza
