= Fibracat TV =

Catalán-language private TV channel

- Country: Spain
- Broadcast area: Catalonia, Andorra
- Headquarters: Manresa

Programming
- Language(s): Catalan
- Picture format: 1080p HDTV

Ownership
- Owner: Fibracat

History
- Launched: 1 June 2020 (4 years ago)
- Replaced: RAC 105 TV
- Closed: 31 December 2022 (2 years ago)
- Replaced by: 8TV (simulcast in HD)

Links
- Website: Official website

Fibracat TV was a Catalan language private TV station based in Manresa, Spain. The channel was run by Fibracat.

The channel was launched on June 1, 2020 after Fibracat, a company dedicated to telephone and internet services, rented the frequency that was used by RAC 105 TV.

The channel's programming consisted of half-hour slots which focus primarily on feminism and new technologies. Therefore, the channel's programs usually deal with issues such as gender equality, women's empowerment, the technological revolution and the social and economic changes generated by these movements.

Fibracat TV ceased activity on New Year's Eve 2022, with no reason for its end of transmission given.
