= Mutant Action =

- Spanish: Acción mutante
- Directed by: Álex de la Iglesia
- Written by: Jorge Guerricaechevarría; Álex de la Iglesia
- Produced by: Agustín Almodóvar; Pedro Almodóvar; Esther García
- Starring: Antonio Resines; Álex Angulo; Frédérique Feder; Fernando Guillén; Enrique San Francisco; Juan Viadas; Karra Elejalde; Saturnino García; Jon Gabella
- Cinematography: Carles Gusi
- Edited by: Pablo Blanco
- Music by: Def Con Dos
- Production companies: El Deseo; CIBY 2000
- Distributed by: Warner Española S.A. (Spain); UGC P.H. (France)
- Release dates: 3 February 1993 (Madrid and Bilbao)
- Running time: 97 minutes
- Countries: Spain; France
- Language: Spanish
- Budget: €1.5 million ($3 million)
- Box office: $1 million

Mutant Action (Spanish: Acción mutante) is a 1993 science fiction black comedy film co-written and directed by Álex de la Iglesia. It stars Antonio Resines, Álex Angulo, and Frédérique Feder.

== Plot ==
A future post-apocalyptic world is ruled by the good-looking people. A terrorist group of disabled people, who see themselves as mutants, take arms against their oppressors. They plan to rid the world of "beautiful people" and superficiality. They are very inept at what they do and mistrust one another. They assassinate body builders, massacre an aerobics class on live TV and blow up a sperm bank as part of their violent campaign.

Led by their chief Ramón Yarritu (Antonio Resines), they plan their final hit before retirement: the kidnapping of Patricia Orujo (Frédérique Feder), the daughter and only heiress of billionaire businessman Lord Orujo (Fernando Guillén), during her wedding. The scene turns into a massacre when the girl cuts the cake with a large sharp knife, puncturing the chest of a terrorist hiding in it. Badly hurt, he opens the cake top and opens fire on the alarmed and unsuspecting attendees. Two members of the terrorist group are killed in the fray, but the rest manage to flee with Patricia as their hostage. They staple Patricia's lips together with a special electronic device and escape from the police in their spaceship that is disguised as a gigantic fish merchant ship.

Ramón, planning to keep the ransom money for himself, hides from the group that the amount set for the exchange is 100 million and declares its only 10 million. The gang accidentally watches a news flash report that reveals the correct amount. The gang gets upset and summons Ramón to explain the misinformation, but he denies it. Ramón kills off his henchmen one by one and blames their deaths on a traitor among the crew of the ship.

Ramón is discovered while killing the last one of the terrorists, Juan (Juan Viadas), who has a Siamese twin, Álex (Álex Angulo), and a fierce fight starts, culminating in the destruction of the guidance system of the ship. The ship crashlands on Axturiax, a brutal and forgotten mining planet inhabited by male miners who are sex-starved because all the women had died. Ramón and Patricia, who has developed Stockholm syndrome, are captured by miners but manage to escape, but not before the miners attempt to gang-rape her. Álex survives the crash and, after befriending an old and blind miner, decides to pursue Ramón to avenge his brother and to rescue Patricia. He has to drag the attached body of his dead brother Juan around with him for the rest of the film. A planned ransom drop trick by Orujo turns into mayhem, when a portable nuclear device is activated by Lord Orujo to wipe clean the whole area. The event is compounded by live TV coverage for the ransom negotiations when Álex arrives and kills Lord Orujo with a headshot, initiating a firefight inside the bar that reaches its climax when the police forces join the show and Ramón decides to sacrifice himself to allow Patricia escape and survive the bar fight with the police forces outside. Greeting Patricia with a French kiss and Álex by telling him he is still useless, he uses Lord Orujo's mini nuke to evaporate the police army outside while the bar trembles and crumbles due to the shockwave.

When the nuclear blast is over, Álex finally gets rid of his Siamese twin's body and finds Patricia hidden under a metal cage that saved her from the blast. They hold each other and then ready a machine gun and leave the destroyed bar.

== Cast ==
- Antonio Resines as Ramón Yarritu
- Álex Angulo as Alex Abadie
- Frédérique Feder as Patricia Orujo
- Karra Elejalde as Manitas
- Fernando Guillén as Orujo
- Enrique San Francisco as Luis María de Ostolaza
- Jaime Blanch as the crazy TV host
- Juan Viadas as Juan Abadie
- Bibiana Fernández & Rossy de Palma as luxury guests
- Féodor Atkine as Kaufmann
- Ramón Barea as blind shepherd
- Santiago Segura as Ezequiel
- Saturnino García as Quimicefa
- Jon Gabella as Chepa
- Alfonso Martínez as M. A.

== Production ==
A Spain-France co-production, Acción mutante was produced by El Deseo and CIBY 2000. The film was shot in Erandio, Biscay. Álex de la Iglesia and Jorge Guerricaechevarría wrote the script over a two year period and gave the script to Agustín and Pedro Almodóvar whom they knew through a mutual friend. The Almodóvars responded favorably to the script as well as Iglesia's 1990 short film Mirindas Asesinas (The Miranda Killings) and told Iglesia that on condition of some adjustments they'd produce the film when they had the time with Iglesia delivering the approved draft four months thereafter. Iglesia stated the comic book Hard Boiled served as an inspiration for Mutant Action. The special effects work included many veterans of the film Delicatessen. During production Iglesia and Pedro Almodóvar often clashed over the level of violence on display in the film with Almodóvar at one point exclaiming to Iglesia that he wished he'd directed the movie himself. Despite Almodóvar's misgivings with Iglesia's approach to the material, Almodóvar respected Iglesia's decisions and never used his status as executive producer to take away control.

== Release ==
The film premiered in Bilbao and Madrid on 3 February 1993.

== Accolades ==
Year	Award	Category	Nominee(s)	Result	Ref.
1993	7th Goya Awards	Best New Director	Álex de la Iglesia	Nominated	
1993	7th Goya Awards	Best Editing	Pablo Blanco	Nominated	
1993	7th Goya Awards	Best Art Direction	José Luis Arrizabalaga	Nominated	
1993	7th Goya Awards	Best Production Supervision	Sandra García	Won	
1993	7th Goya Awards	Best Makeup and Hairstyles	Paca Almenara	Won	
1993	7th Goya Awards	Best Special Effects	Olivier Gleyze, Yves Domenjoud, Jean-Baptiste Bonetto, Bernard André Le Boette, Emilio Ruiz del Río, Hipólito Cantero	Won	

== See also ==
- List of Spanish films of 1993

== Bibliography ==
- Buse, Peter; Triana Toribio, Núria; Willis, Andy (2007). The cinema of Álex de la Iglesia. Manchester and New York: Manchester University Press. ISBN 9780719071362.
