= Sing On! Spain =

2020 Netflix series

- Spanish: ¡A cantar!
- Genre: reality show
- Presented by: Ricky Merino
- Country of origin: Spain
- Original language: Spanish
- No. of seasons: 1
- No. of episodes: 8

Production
- Running time: 37-42 minutes

Original release
- Network: Netflix
- Release: 24 July 2020

Sing On! Spain (Spanish: ¡A cantar!) is a 2020 reality television series hosted by Ricky Merino.

== Release ==
Sing On! Spain was released on July 24, 2020, on Netflix.
