= Álex de la Iglesia =

Spanish filmmaker (born 1965)

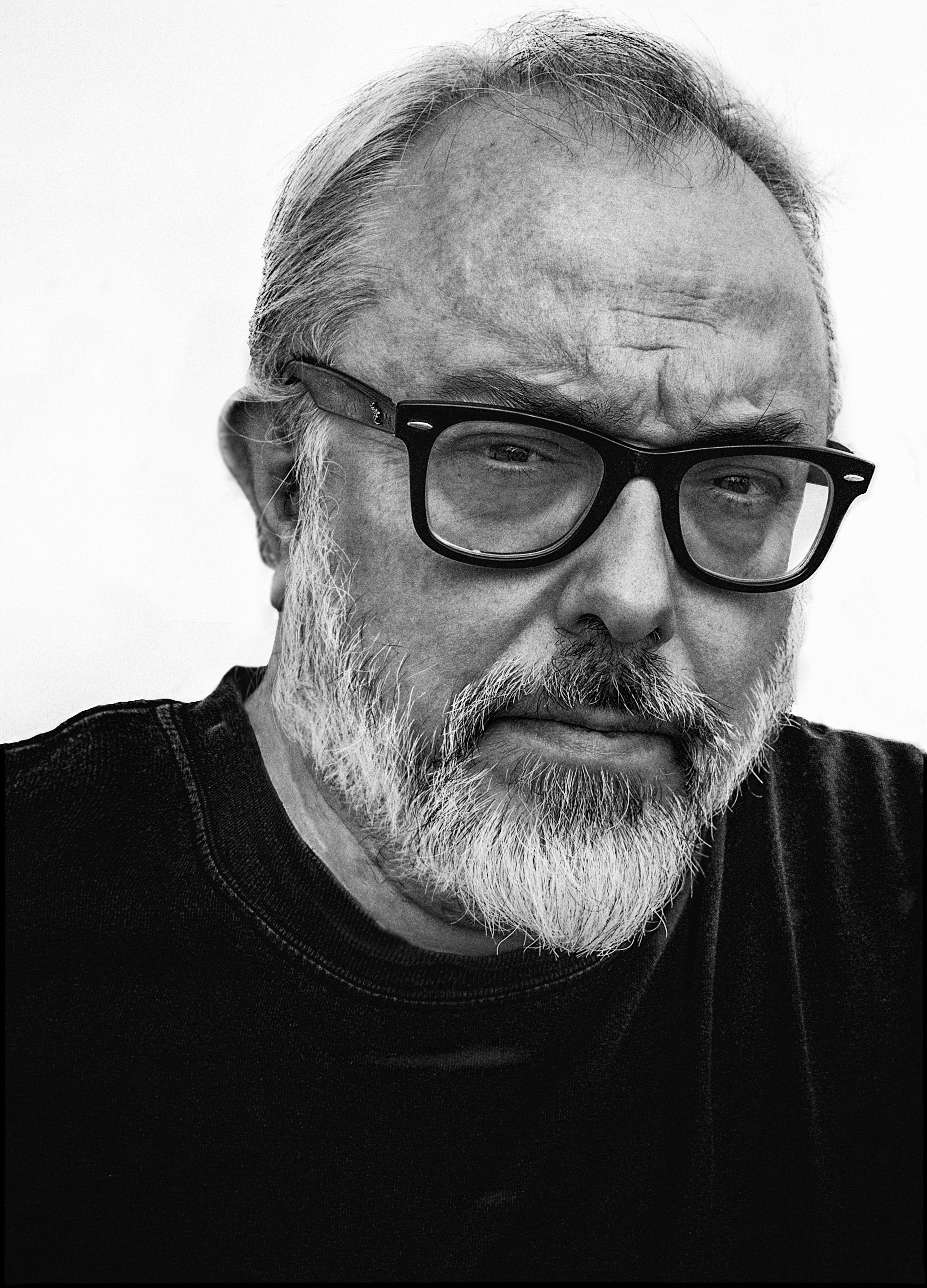
- De la Iglesia in 2023
- Born: Alejandro de la Iglesia Mendoza; 4 December 1965 (age 60); Bilbao, Biscay, Spain
- Education: University of Deusto
- Occupations: Film director; screenwriter; producer
- Spouses: Amaya Díez (m. 1997–2010) Carolina Bang (m. 2014)
- Children: 4

Alejandro "Álex" de la Iglesia Mendoza (born 4 December 1965) is a Spanish film director, screenwriter, producer and former comic book artist.

De la Iglesia's films combine grotesque and very dark elements such as death and murder: most of his works are considered dark comedies, but are also often considered to have horror and/or drama elements. All his films, with the notable exceptions of The Last Circus (2010) and As Luck Would Have It (2011), were written together with Jorge Guerricaechevarría.

== Biography ==
Studies and early career

With a degree in philosophy from the University of Deusto, De la Iglesia began drawing comics in fanzines such as No, el fanzine maldito and Metacrilato, as well as in magazines such as Trokola, Burdinjaun and La Ría del Ocio. De la Iglesia always acknowledges Alex Raymond (creator of Flash Gordon) and Stan Lee (founder of Marvel Comics and co-creator of Spider-Man and The Hulk) as his main inspiration as a comics artist.

It was also around this time, between 1986 and 1989, when he founded in Bilbao one of the first role-game clubs in Spain: Los Pelotas.

In his debut in the film industry, De la Iglesia was art director in the short film Mamá (1988), by Pablo Berger, and again in Enrique Urbizu's feature Todo por la pasta (Anything for Bread (1991). De la Iglesia had already collaborated with Enrique Urbizu and Joaquín Trincado designing the poster for their first film, Tu novia está loca (1988).

Álex de la Iglesia's first short film, Mirindas asesinas (1991), got the attention of Pedro Almodóvar, whose production company, El Deseo, collaborated in De la Iglesia's first feature film, Acción mutante (the sci-fi actioner) (1993).

El día de la Bestia

De la Iglesia's next movie would establish him as one of the most important directors of Spanish cinema: El día de la Bestia (1995), written with Jorge Guerricaechevarría, co-screenwriter in most of Álex de la Iglesia's films since then. Released internationally as "The day of the Beast", the film won six Goya awards, including the award for Best Director. This piece turned Santiago Segura into one of Spain's best-known actors and brought back actress Terele Pávez, her being a regular in his movies until her demise in 2017.

Maverick director

Subsequently, De la Iglesia has been combining productions aimed at an international audience with others closer to the Spanish cultural taste. Many veteran Spanish actors and actresses have worked under his direction, from Carmen Maura to María Asquerino, as well as several Hollywood stars like Rosie Pérez, Elijah Wood, John Hurt or Salma Hayek.

He directed the performances of Javier Bardem, Rosie Pérez and James Gandolfini in Perdita Durango (1997); Santiago Segura and El Gran Wyoming in Muertos de risa ("Dying of Laughter", 1999); Carmen Maura, Manuel Tejada and Paca Gabaldón in La comunidad ("Common Wealth", 2000); Sancho Gracia, Ángel de Andrés López and Eusebio Poncela in 800 balas ("800 Bullets", 2002); Guillermo Toledo, Mónica Cervera and Kira Miró in Crimen ferpecto ("Ferpect Crime", 2004); and Elijah Wood, Leonor Watling and John Hurt in Los crímenes de Oxford ("The Oxford Murders", 2007).

Balada triste de trompeta

His film, Balada triste de trompeta ("The Last Circus", 2010) was awarded two prizes at the 67th Venice International Film Festival, namely, an Osella for Best Screenplay and the Silver Lion for Best Direction. It was also nominated for fifteen Goya awards in 2011, including Best Director, Best Film And Best Original Screenplay. It got to receive the awards for Best Makeup and Best Special Effects. The New York Times praised the movie on a raving piece when the film opened theatrically in the US.

Box Office Hits: Las brujas de Zugarramurdi and Perfectos desconocidos

In 2011, De la Iglesia released La chispa de la vida ("As Luck Would Have It"), starring José Mota and Salma Hayek, and shot in the coastal Spanish town of Cartagena.

2013 was the year of Las brujas de Zugarramurdi ("Witching & Bitching"), one of Álex de la Iglesia's most successful movies, praised by audience and critics. He began shooting it in the fall of 2012 with an extensive cast that included Carmen Maura, Macarena Gómez, Hugo Silva, Mario Casas, Carolina Bang, Terele Pávez and Pepón Nieto, and some cameos by Santiago Segura and Carlos Areces. The film was released in Spain on September 27, 2013, and achieved relevant commercial success, grossing 14.6 million euros, with a total cost of 6M€. It was awarded eight Goyas, including Best Supporting Actress for the veteran actress, Terele Pávez.

De la Iglesia then surprised everyone with Mi gran noche ("My Big Night", 2015), an ensemble film that marked Spanish singer superstar Raphael's comeback to cinema after 40years. Raphael heads a huge cast that included Mario Casas, Pepón Nieto, Blanca Suárez, Carlos Areces, Luis Callejo, Carmen Machi, Jaime Ordóñez, Santiago Segura, Enrique Villén, Hugo Silva, Carolina Bang, Terele Pávez, Carmen Ruiz, Marta Guerras, Ana Polvorosa, Toni Acosta and Luis Fernández, among many others. Mi gran noche was another box-office success for its director, grossing almost three times the four million euros it cost.

In 2017, Álex de la Iglesia released two films: El Bar, with several of his already regular actors (Blanca Suárez, Mario Casas, Carmen Machi, Pepón Nieto, Terele Pávez), and the remake of the Italian film Perfetti sconosciuti, titled in Spanish Perfectos desconocidos ("Perfect Stragers" internationally), with another impressive cast including Belén Rueda and Eduardo Noriega. Perfectos desconocidos was the director's biggest box-office return to date, with almost 20 million euros grossed.

The rise of Pokeepsie Films

In 2009, producer Carolina Bang and Álex de la Iglesia established the production company Pokeepsie Films. Created to nurture a new generation of filmmakers, Pokeepsie films have produced a slate of features, such as Paper House's director Koldo Serra's 70 Bin Ladens ("70 Big Ones"), Eduardo Casanova's multi-awarded Pieles ("Skins") and La Pietà (released theatrically on January 13th, 2022), Esteban Roel and Juanfer Andrés' Musarañas ("Shrew's Nest"), starred byMacarena Gómez, Alex de la Iglesia's El bar, Ignacio Tatay's The Chalk Line (nº2 non-English language film in Netflix for 2 weeks in October 2022), Jaume Balagueró's Venus, and recently HBO's massive hit 30 monedas ("30 coins"), seasons 1 and 2.

In February 2021, Álex de la Iglesia announced the shooting of a new film under his direction, produced by Mediaset España, together with his production company. The film is called El cuarto pasajero ("Four's a crowd") and stars Blanca Suárez, Ernesto Alterio, Alberto San Juan and Rubén Cortada. With "Four's a crowd" as international title, El cuarto pasajero was released in Spain in October 2022, with excellent box-office returns

The Fear Collection

In the recent years, Pokeepsie films expanded their activities with ambitious projects such as The Fear Collection, a partnership with Sony Pictures and Amazon Prime to produce a series of horror feature films co-produced by Pokeepsie Films. The movies will be directed by some notable Spanish filmmakers such as Jaume Balagueró, Paula Ortiz, and Álex de la Iglesia himself, among many others. The first film of The Fear Collection is Venicephrenia, directed by De la Iglesia. Venicephrenia had its world-premiere at the Sitges International Fantastic Film Festival of Catalonia and was released in Spring 2022. The second feature of this collection is Venus, directed by prestigious Catalan helmer Jaume Balagueró. Venus had its world premiere at Toronto International Film Festival. Starring Ester Expósito, it was released theatrically on December 2, 2022.

Television Álex de la Iglesia has directed sketches for TV shows such as El peor programa de la semana with El Gran Wyoming (TVE) and Inocente, Inocente (regional television), as well as the series Plutón B.R.B. Nero (2008) for La 2 (TVE). This one is a parody of science fiction series starring Antonio Gil, Carolina Bang and Carlos Areces, among others.

At the Venice International Film Festival of 2020, he presented his series 30 monedas ("30 Coins"), which premiered on HBO Spain on November 29 of that same year. The series tells the ordeal of Father Vergara, an exorcist, boxer and ex-convict exiled in a parish of a remote village in Spain. In December 2021, HBO announced 30 monedas was the most viewed show in Spain.

== Presidency of the Film Academy ==
Álex de la Iglesia was elected president of the Academy of Cinematograhic Arts of Spain on June 21, 2009, after presenting himself as candidate — together with Icíar Bollaín and Emilio A. Pina — to replace Ángeles González-Sinde after her appointment as Minister of Culture. De la Iglesia's main goals as the head of the national industry were to "bring back together at the Academy all the artists who left Spain or are far from the institution". With this, he was aiming at Pedro Almodóvar and his brother, Agustín Almodóvar, who left the organization in 2005 publicly disagreeing with the institution's voting system. And also José Luis Garci as well, who left the academy in 1999 due to another controversy related with the voting procedures. The filmmaker from Bilbao was also committed to the fight against piracy. In his own words, he wanted to "defend the people who make a living from making films".

On February 14, 2010, De la Iglesia gave his most celebrated speech as president of the Film Academy at the Goya Awards gala, recalling that it was necessary to create laws "that protect the coexistence of all sectors, and that also includes filmmaking". For this reason, the then president of the academy participated in the debate on the second final provision of the Sustainable Economy Law (known as the Sinde-Wert Law) after it was rejected in the Congress on December 21, 2010. This text raised the possibility of closing Internet pages that violate copyright laws after the intervention of an Intellectual Property Commission, instead of just a judge or a magistrate.

== Recurring collaborators ==
Álex de la Iglesia's films usually feature actors and actresses he completely trusts and with whom he has worked before. The most prominent is Santiago Segura, to whom he offered his first role in a feature film, but there have also been frequent appearances by Mario Casas and Carlos Areces, as they were the sorely missed Terele Pávez and Álex Angulo. Antonio de la Torre, Enrique Villén, Secun de la Rosa or Manuel Tallafé are also regulars in his films, often in very solid supporting roles. Jorge Guerricaechevarría has been his co-screenwriter in practically all his works. Some of these actors have also appeared in films produced but not directed by Álex de la Iglesia and, in the case of Macarena Gómez, she has been commonly seen in films he produced, including Gómez's instant-cult prominent role in seasons 1 and 2 of HBO's 30 monedas ("30 Coins").

== Books ==
In 1997 he published the novel Payasos en la lavadora ("Clowns in the Washing Machine"). In 2014 he published his second novel Recuérdame que te odie ("Remind me to hate you"). In 2022 Norma editorial released Arte y ensayo, a compilation of essays on Álex de la Iglesia's facet as a graphic artist.

== Filmography ==
=== Film ===
Year	Film	Director	Writer	Producer	Notes
1993	Mutant Action	Yes	Yes	No	
1995	The Day of the Beast	Yes	Yes	No	
1997	Dance with the Devil	Yes	Yes	No	
1999	Dying of Laughter	Yes	Yes	No	Also uncredited cameo role as "Espectador que grita a Bruno para que le enseñe las tetas"
2000	Common Wealth	Yes	Yes	No	
2002	800 Bullets	Yes	Yes	Uncredited	
2004	Crimen Ferpecto	Yes	Yes	Yes	
2008	The Oxford Murders	Yes	Yes	Uncredited	
2010	The Last Circus	Yes	Yes	No	
2011	As Luck Would Have It	Yes	No	No	
2013	Witching & Bitching	Yes	Yes	No	
2014	Messi	Yes	No	No	Documentary film about Lionel Messi
2015	My Big Night	Yes	Yes	No	
2017	The Bar	Yes	Yes	Yes	
2017	Perfect Strangers	Yes	Yes	Yes	
2021	Venicephrenia	Yes	Yes	Yes	
2022	Four's a Crowd	Yes	Yes	Yes	
TBD	Mandrágora	Yes	Yes	Yes	Pre-production

=== Producer only ===
Year	Title	Notes
2014	Shrew's Nest	Presenter
2015	The Heroes of Evil	Presenter
2017	Skins	Presenter
2017	Errementari	Presenter
2018	Up Among the Stars	Presenter
2018	70 Big Ones	
2022	Piety	Presenter
2022	Jaula	Presenter
2022	Venus	Presenter
2023	My Fault	
2024	Un mal día lo tiene cualquiera	Presenter

=== Short film ===
Year	Film	Director	Writer	Notes
1990	Mirindas Asesinas	Yes	Yes	Also art director
2000	¡Enigma en el bosquecillo!	Yes	No	
2006	El Código	Yes	Yes	Also editor, sound and actor Role: Interviewer (voice)
2006	Hitler está vivo	Yes	Yes	Also editor
2011	Cómicos	Yes	Yes	Content branded short film
2013	El Contrato de Vodafone Yu	Yes	Yes	Content branded short film
2014	The Confession	Yes	Yes	Segment from the anthology film Words With Gods, also segment producer
2018	Una vez en la vida	Yes	Yes	Content branded short film, destroyed film
2023	Pase lo que pase	Yes	No	Content branded short film

=== Other work ===
Year	Film	Work	Notes
1988	Tú novia esta loca	Collaborator	Film
1988	Mama	Art director	Short film
1991	Todo por la pasta	Art director	Film
2014	Torrente 5: Operación Eurovegas	Script consultant	Film

=== Television ===
Year	Film	Director	Writer	Executive Producer	Notes
2006	The Baby's Room	Yes	Yes	No	TV movie
2008	Plutón B.R.B. Nero	Yes	Yes	No	TV series, also co-producer and did a cameo in 1 episode as "El Padre"
2009	La tragedia de Franco	Yes	Yes	No	TV Short film, also actor as himself
2020–present	30 Coins	Yes	Yes	Yes	TV series
2023	Headless Chickens	No	Original idea	Yes	TV mini-series
2024	1992	Yes	Yes	Yes	TV Series

== Awards and accolades ==
Goya Awards

Goya Awards
Year	Award	Title	Result
1992	Best Novel Director	Acción mutante	Nominated
1995	Best Director	El día de la bestia	Won
1995	Best Original Screenplay	El día de la bestia	Nominated
2000	Best Director	La comunidad	Nominated
2000	Best Original Screenplay	La comunidad	Nominated
2008	Best Director	Los crímenes de Oxford	Nominated
2008	Best Adapted Screenplay	Los crímenes de Oxford	Nominated
2010	Best Director	Balada triste de trompeta	Nominated
2010	Best Original Screenplay	Balada triste de trompeta	Nominated

Medallas del Círculo de Escritores Cinematográficos (CEC Awards)
Year	Award	Title	Result
1995	Best Director	El día de la bestia	Won

Nocturna Madrid International Fantastic Film Festival
Year	Award	Category	Result
2005	Maestro del fantástico	Trajectory	Won

Sitges Film Festival
Year	Award	Category	Result
2005	Time Machine Award	Trajectory	Won

Premio Nacional de Cinematografía (National Cinematography Award)
Year	Award	Category	Result
2010	National Cinematography Award granted by the Ministry of Culture.	Trajectory	Won

Venice International Film Festival
Year	Award	Title	Result
2010	Silver Lion for Best Direction	Won	Balada triste de trompeta
2010	Osella for Best Screenplay	Won	Balada triste de trompeta
2010	Arca Cinema Giovani Award	Won	Balada triste de trompeta

Silver Condor Awards

Silver Condor Awards
Year	Award	Title	Result
2012	Best Ibero-American film	Balada triste de trompeta	Won

Premios Pávez - Festival Nacional de Cortometrajes Talavera de la Reina
Year	Award	Result
2017	Pávez Honorífico	Won

Medalla de plata de la Comunidad de Madrid (2016)

Medalla de Oro al Mérito en las Bellas Artes (Gold Medal of Merits in the Fine Arts - 2020)

== Interviews ==
- Slant
- Green Cine Daily
- Boston Globe
- IFC
- Village Voice
