= List of RTVE Play original programming =

RTVE Play is an over-the-top video on demand streaming service owned and operated by RTVE which replaced the latter's old streaming portal 'alacarta' in June 2021. Besides the programming in the linear stations of TVE and RNE and the content from Playz, the platform distributes a number of exclusive original shows as well it releases pre-screenings of the linear airings.

== Programming ==
=== New shows ===
Title	Genre	Premiere	Seasons	Ref.
Ana Tramel. El juego	Legal thriller	21 September 2021	1 season, 6 episodes	
Edelweiss	Docuseries	22 September 2021	1 season, 4 episodes	
Susana y el sexo	Documentary film	6 October 2021	Single-episode documentary	
Ruiz-Mateos, el primer fenómeno viral	Docuseries	27 October 2021	1 season, 4 episodes	
La última frontera	Docuseries	15 November 2021	1 season, 4 episodes	
Yrreal	Action thriller	17 November 2021	1 season, 6 episodes	
Lucía en la telaraña	True crime docuseries	24 November 2021	1 season, 5 episodes	
Raíces	Docuseries	23 February 2022	1 season, 2 episodes	
Ser o no ser	Teen comedy drama	30 March 2022	1 season, 6 episodes	
Dieciocho	Teen drama	23 October 2024	1 season, 6 episodes	

=== Continuations ===
Title	Genre	Prev.	Premiere	Seasons	Notes
Grasa (S. 2)	Comedy drama	playz	27 September 2021	1 season, 6 episodes	Full release at once.
HIT (S. 2)	Drama	La 1	21 October 2021	1 season, 10 episodes	Weekly release predating by some hours the linear TV airing.

== See also ==
- List of programs broadcast by TVE (RTVE Play archives)
