= 27th Forqué Awards =

2021 Spanish film and television awards

- Date: 11 December 2021
- Site: IFEMA Palacio Municipal, Madrid, Spain
- Hosted by: Elena S. Sánchez; Marta Hazas
- Organized by: EGEDA

Highlights
- Best Picture: The Good Boss
- Best Actor: Javier Bardem; The Good Boss
- Best Actress: Blanca Portillo; Maixabel

Television coverage
- Network: RTVE Play

The 27th ceremony of the Forqué Awards, presented by EGEDA, was held on 11 December 2021 at the IFEMA Palacio Municipal in Madrid. The gala aired on RTVE Play and was hosted by Elena S. Sánchez and Marta Hazas.

== History ==
The nominations were disclosed on 11 November 2021.

The ceremony, organised by the association of producers EGEDA, had the participation of the Ayuntamiento de Madrid, the Community of Madrid and RTVE, the collaboration of the Spanish Ministry of Culture and Sport and the sponsoring of Centro Comercial Príncipe Pío, CINESA, Cornejo, FIPCA and Mercedes-Benz.

The gala, which paid homage to the 1980s, featured musical performances by the likes of Alaska, Ana Guerra, Burning, Danza Invisible, Javier Gurruchaga, La Frontera, La Guardia, Los Secretos, Los Trogloditas, Mikel Erentxun, Modestia Aparte or Tennessee. It was hosted by Elena S. Sánchez and Marta Hazas.

The chairman of EGEDA, Enrique Cerezo, gifted the Gold Medal recognizing a career in the audiovisual industry to producer José Antonio Félez.

== Winners and nominees ==
The winners and nominees are listed as follows:

Best Fiction or Animation Film: The Good Boss; Parallel Mothers; Maixabel; Mediterraneo: The Law of the Sea	Best Fiction Series: Hierro; Stories to Stay Awake; La Fortuna; Queer You Are
Best Male Performance in a Film: Javier Bardem — The Good Boss; Eduard Fernández — Mediterraneo: The Law of the Sea; Luis Tosar — Maixabel; Urko Olazabal — Maixabel	Best Female Performance in a Film: Blanca Portillo — Maixabel; Marta Nieto — Out of Sync; Penélope Cruz — Parallel Mothers; Petra Martínez — That Was Life
Best Male Performance in a Series: Javier Cámara — Venga Juan; Álvaro Mel — La Fortuna; Darío Grandinetti — Hierro; Javier Gutiérrez — Reyes de la noche	Best Female Performance in a Series: Candela Peña — Hierro; Ana Polvorosa — La Fortuna; Maribel Verdú — ANA. all in; Nadia de Santiago — El tiempo que te doy
Best Documentary Film: 100 días con la tata; Buñuel, un cineasta surrealista; Héroes, silencio y rock and roll; Who's Stopping Us?	Best Latin-American Film: Prayers for the Stolen; 98 segundos sin sombra; Dogwashers; Los lobos
Best Short Film: El monstruo invisible; Mindanao; The Monkey	Cinema and Education in Values: Maixabel; 100 días con la tata; Mediterraneo: The Law of the Sea; Parallel Mothers
