= Marsol =

Marsol (Catalan pronunciation: [məɾˈsɔl]) is a surname of Catalan origin. It can refer to:

== People ==
- Ander Puig Marsol (born 2001), Spanish and Catalan actor
- Conxita Marsol (born 1960), Andorran lawyer and politician
- Kílian Sebrià Marsol (born 1964), Spanish and Catalan journalist
- Rossend Marsol Clua (1922–2006), Andorran journalist and writer

== Other ==
- Marsol (chestnut), a natural chestnut hybrid
