= Esther Acebo =

Spanish actress

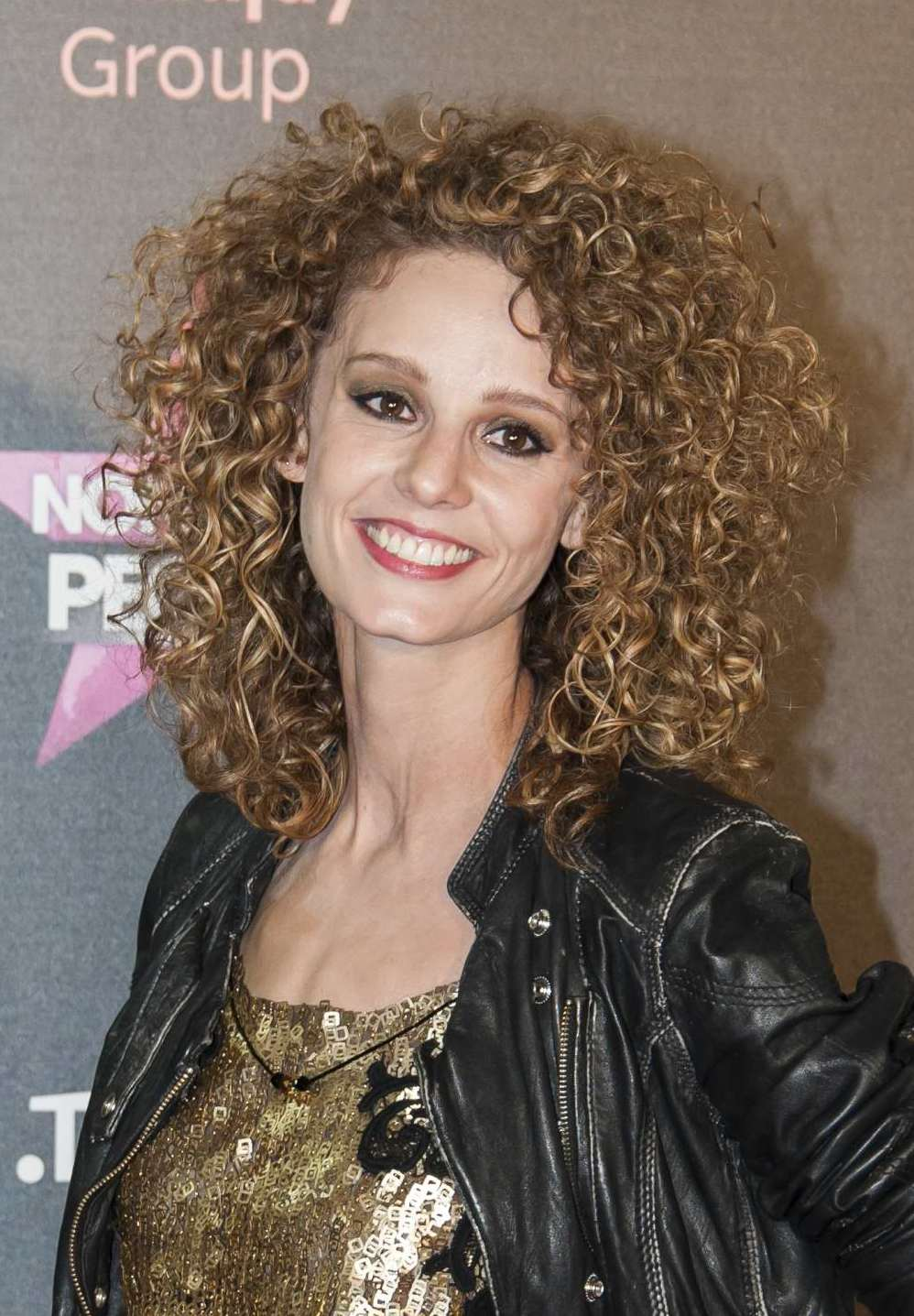
- Born: 19 January 1983 (age 43); Madrid, Spain
- Occupations: Actress; presenter; reporter
- Children: 1
- Website: www.estheracebo.es

Esther Acebo (born 19 January 1983) is a Spanish actress, presenter and reporter. As an actress she has appeared in Los encantados (2016) and achieved worldwide fame in Money Heist (2017).

== Biography ==
Acebo studied physical activity and sport sciences at the University of Castilla–La Mancha. Her first opportunity came as host of the children's program Kosmi Club. After this, she became a reporter and presenter on youth channel Non Stop People, on the Movistar+ platform.

She continued to work as an actress and made her debut on national television with Ángel o Demonio (Telecinco). She also made the leap to cinema with a film by Ricardo Dávila, Los Encantados (The Enchanted Ones), which was released online in 2016. Additionally, she has participated in the short film Baraka, directed by Néstor Ruiz Medina, the only Spanish-language short film selected for the Tribeca Film Festival 2016.

On May 2, 2017 Money Heist premiered, in which she played Mónica Gaztambide (Stockholm), who later became one of the main characters.

In 2018 she participated in the feature film Growing Up, directed by Clara Martínez-Lázaro. She starred as Diana in the 2019 miniseries Antes de perder alongside Mariam Hernández, which was released on Playz. In 2020 she filmed the Spanish horror film The Chalk Line, directed by Ignacio Tatay.
