= Álvaro Mel =

Spanish actor and model

- Born: Álvaro García Sierra; 14 September 1996 (age 29); Salamanca, Castile and León, Spain
- Occupations: Actor; model

Álvaro García Sierra (born 14 September 1996), better known as Álvaro Mel, is a Spanish actor and model.

== Life and career ==
Álvaro García Sierra was born in Salamanca on 14 September 1996. Raised in Salamanca, he moved to Valladolid to study a degree in architecture. Prior to acting, he earned a living as Instagram influencer, DJ, and model. He moved to Madrid and, introduced by acquaintance Guillermo Campra, he attended some casting calls.

He made his acting debut in Playz webseries Bajo la red (2018), playing the role of Joel. He then featured in period drama television series A Different View, portraying Andalusian-accented Tomás Peralta, and also appeared in Madres. Amor y vida. He was cast to star as Álex Ventura in Alejandro Amenábar's miniseries La Fortuna, which began shooting in 2020. His performance earned him a nomination for Best Television Actor at the 27th Forqué Awards. He later featured as Mateo in season 2 of fantasy television series Paradise (2022) and starred in romantic comedy television series A Perfect Story. In 2023, he featured as Sebas in slasher Netflix film Killer Book Club, his film debut. In 2025, he featured in the period comedy-drama series The Lady's Companion.
