= Ser o no ser =

- Created by: Coral Cruz
- Written by: Coral Cruz
- Directed by: Marta Pahissa
- Starring: Ander Puig
- Country of origin: Spain
- Original languages: Spanish; Catalan
- No. of seasons: 2
- No. of episodes: 12

Production
- Cinematography: Pol Orpinell Freixa
- Production companies: RTVE; Big Bang Media

Original release
- Network: RTVE Play
- Release: 30 March 2022

Ser o no ser is a Spanish teen drama television series created by Coral Cruz for RTVE Play (Playz) which premiered on 30 March 2022. The cast is led by Ander Puig.

== Plot ==
The plot follows the story of 16-year-old trans student Joel, who joins a new high school in order to pursue the title of Baccalaureate with specialization in performing arts. Choosing to not disclose his gender transition to his new classmates, he struggles with the requirements from his acting teacher. Meanwhile, he develops a crush on classmate Ona.

== Cast ==
- Ander Puig as Joel
- Anna Alarcón as Ana
- Júlia Gibert as Ona
- Berta Galo as Laia
- Lion Armas as Ricky
- Eduard Torres as Víctor
- Enzo Oliver as Álex
- Nil Carbonell as Gaby
- Anna Bernal as Xènia
- Lluïsa Mallol as Rosa
- Emma Vilarasau as Carmen
- Alícia Falcó as Bruna

== Production ==
Created and written by Coral Cruz, the series was produced by RTVE in collaboration with Big Bang Media (The Mediapro Studio). Directed by Marta Pahissa, it consists of 6 episodes featuring a running time of around 25 minutes. The series began filming in Barcelona by October 2021.

== Release ==
RTVE Play released the series on 30 March 2022. The series was renewed for a second season, which premiered on 11 October 2023.

== Accolades ==
Year	Award	Category	Nominee(s)	Result	Ref.
2023	34th GLAAD Media Awards	Outstanding Spanish-Language Scripted Television Series		Nominated	
