= Antes de perder =

Television series

- Official poster
- Genre: Road movie; Action; Comedy
- Written by: Daniel D. García; Sandra Lesta; Sonia Méndez
- Directed by: Sonia Méndez
- Starring: Esther Acebo; Mariam Hernández
- Country of origin: Spain
- Original language: Spanish
- No. of seasons: 1
- No. of episodes: 7

Production
- Production location: Galicia
- Cinematography: Lucía Catoira
- Running time: c. 15 min
- Production companies: RTVE; Cósmica Producións

Original release
- Network: playz
- Release: 7 March 2019

Antes de perder is a Spanish streaming television miniseries set in Galicia directed by Sonia Méndez which stars Esther Acebo and Mariam Hernández. Produced by RTVE in collaboration with Cósmica Producións, it was released on Playz in March 2019.

== Premise ==
An action series displaying feminist themes and comedy elements, the fiction develops as a sort of road movie, following Jana and Diana, two very different women in their 30s who embark into an adventure throughout Galician roads with no turning back while forging a strong friendship.

== Cast ==
- Esther Acebo as Diana
- Mariam Hernández as Jana
- Manuel Manquiña as Comisario Méndez
- David Amor as Cabo Fontán
- Xosé Barato as Luis
- Xúlio Abonjo as Fernando
- Patricia Vázquez as Casilda
- Carolina Iglesias (Percebes y grelos) as Yennifer
- Alberto Rolán as Charly
- Federico Pérez as Sargento Lestedo
- Marcos Pereiro as Enfermero 1
- Xosé A. Touriñán as Enfermero 2

== Production and release ==
Produced by RTVE in collaboration with Cósmica Producciones, Antes de perder began filming in Galicia by early July 2018. It became the first Galician-produced Playz original series. Antes de perder was written by Daniel D. García, Sandra Lesta and Sonia Méndez and directed by Sonia Méndez. Consisting of 7 episodes of around 15 minutes, the series was fully released on Playz on 7 March 2019. Nati Juncal was credited as producer whereas Lucía Catoira worked as director of photography.

Series	Episodes	Originally released	Network	Ref.
1	7	7 March 2019	playz	

No.	Title	Directed by	Original release date
1	"Hemos terminado"	Sonia Méndez	7 March 2019
2	"Juerga de chicas"	Sonia Méndez	7 March 2019
3	"Turbio y sexi"	Sonia Méndez	7 March 2019
4	"Pura raza vikinga"	Sonia Méndez	7 March 2019
5	"El paraíso"	Sonia Méndez	7 March 2019
6	"La defensa del reino"	Sonia Méndez	7 March 2019
7	"Buena suerte, chicas"	Sonia Méndez	7 March 2019

== Awards and nominations ==
Year	Award	Category	Nominee(s)	Result	Ref.
2020	18th Mestre Mateo Awards	Best Web Series		Won	
