= Carolina Iglesias =

Spanish YouTuber

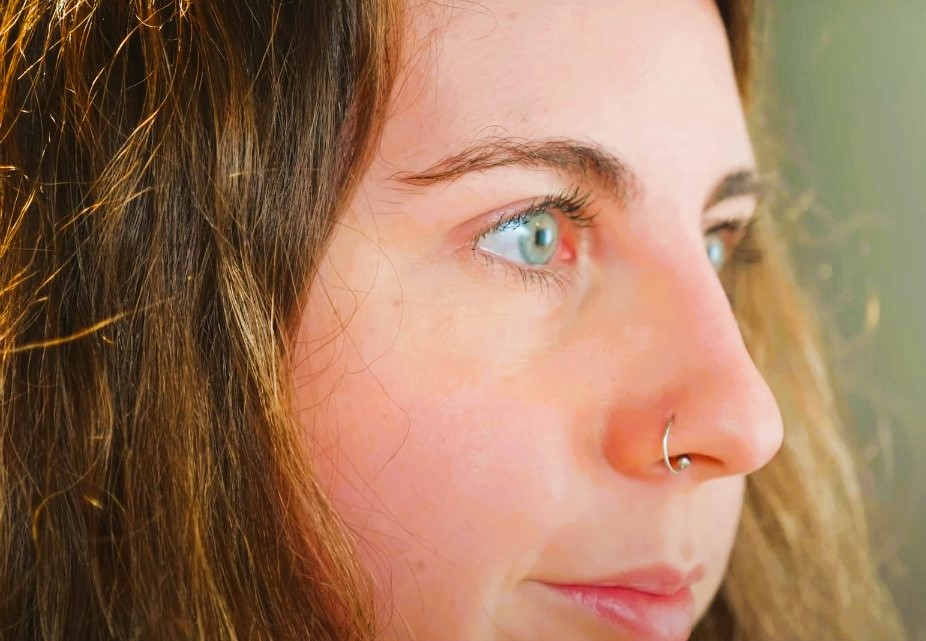
- Born: 8 August 1993 (age 32); Oleiros, Spain
- Occupations: Comedian; screenwriter; YouTuber

YouTube information
- Channel: Carolina Iglesias - Percebesygrelos
- Years active: 2012-present
- Subscribers: 165 thousand
- Views: 28.5 million
- Last updated: 14 October 2024

Carolina Iglesias (born 8 August 1993 in Oleiros), also known as Percebes y Grelos, is a Spanish comedian, screenwriter, and YouTuber. In 2021, she was recognized with the Marcela and Elisa Award for her work in favor of LGTBI+, rights, being the youngest person to receive this award.

== Trajectory ==
In 2017, she began co-hosting Yu: No te pierdas nada, one of the star programs of the radio network Los 40, and has worked on programs such as Zapeando, Lo siguiente (the TVE program hosted by Raquel Sánchez Silva), on Operación Triunfo, Hora yutuber or Youtubers Live. She also starred in the Palacio de la Prensa in a theatrical show about the nostalgia of twenty-somethings called Que vuelva Fotolog together with the YouTuber Esty Quesada (Soy una pringada).

On 18 September 2019 she began to publish on her YouTube channel #UnaCañaCon, a space sponsored by Mahou in which she interviews artists. That same year, Iglesias hosted the XVII Mestre Mateo Awards along with Camila Bossa, David Amor, Xlio Abonjo, and Fernando Epelde.

Since May 2020, she has presented Estirando el chicle, a podcast created together with Victoria Martín that, although it began recording from their homes, was signed by Podium Podcast in its second season. Since its launch, in the midst of strict confinement (March–May) caused by the COVID-19 pandemic, it became one of the most listened to independent podcasts in Spain. Also in 2020, she premiered on YouTube, together with Victoria Martín Válidas, a webseries about two female comedians going through a bad time and who decide to pose as a couple to achieve social success. Iglesias and Martín wrote and starred in it.

In 2021, Iglesias began collaborating with Henar Álvarez in the weekly comedy segment Tarde lo que tarde on Radio Nacional de España.

== Filmography ==
=== Programs ===
Year	Program	Channel	Role
2017–2018	El chat de OT	La 1	Host
2018	Lo siguiente	La 1	Collaborator
2018	Ilustres ignorantes	Movistar+	Guest
2019	Zapeando	laSexta	Collaborator
2019	Problemas del primer mundo	Flooxer	Collaborator
2019	Roast Battle	Comedy Central	Monologuist
2020	Roast a España	Comedy Central	Monologuist
2022	LOL: Si te ríes, pierdes	Prime Video	Host

=== Series ===
Year	Series	Channel	Character	Duration
2019	Antes de perder	Playz	Yeniffer	1 episode
2019	Paquita Salas	Netflix	Amiga de Belén	1 episode
2019	Dating Stories	Badoo	Irene	1 episode
2020	Válidas	YouTube	Carolina	5 episodes
2021	La reina del pueblo	Flooxer	Chica Mensaje	1 episode
2021	Luimelia	Atresplayer Premium	Carolina	1 episode

=== Podcast ===
Year	Program	Channel	Role
2020–present	Estirando el chicle	Podium Podcast	Co–Host

== Awards ==
In October 2021, Estirando el chicle by Iglesias and Victoria Martín, broadcast on Podium Podcast, received the Ondas Award for Best podcast or digital broadcasting program.
