= La Fortuna (TV series) =

Television series

- Genre: Drama
- Based on: El tesoro del Cisne Negro by Paco Roca and Guillermo Corral
- Screenplay by: Alejandro Amenábar; Alejandro Hernández
- Directed by: Alejandro Amenábar
- Starring: Álvaro Mel; Ana Polvorosa; Clarke Peters; Karra Elejalde; T'Nia Miller; Duncan Pow; Manolo Solo; Pedro Casablanc; Blanca Portillo; Stanley Tucci
- Countries of origin: Spain; United States
- Original languages: Spanish; English
- No. of seasons: 1
- No. of episodes: 6

Production
- Production companies: Movistar+; AMC Studios; MOD Producciones

Original release
- Network: Movistar+
- Release: 30 September 2021

La Fortuna is a Spanish-American adventure drama television miniseries. Directed by Alejandro Amenábar, and starring Álvaro Mel, Ana Polvorosa, Stanley Tucci, T'Nia Miller and Clarke Peters, among others, it is an adaptation of the 2018 graphic novel El tesoro del Cisne Negro by Paco Roca and Guillermo Corral. It premiered on 30 September 2021 on Movistar+.

== Premise ==
Álex Ventura is a young diplomat who ends up becoming the leader of a collective effort to recover an underwater shipwreck seized by Frank Wild, a treasure hunter.

== Cast ==
- Álvaro Mel as Álex Ventura, a young diplomat.
- Ana Polvorosa as Lucía Vallarta, a civil servant.
- Stanley Tucci as Frank Wild, a treasure hunter.
- T'Nia Miller as Susan McLean, a lawyer collaborating with Frank Wild.
- Clarke Peters as Jonas Pierce, a lawyer helping the Spanish Ministry of Culture.
- Karra Elejalde as Enrique Moliner, Spanish Minister of Culture.
- Manolo Solo as Horacio Valverde, a former legionary.
- Pedro Casablanc as Ambassador Arribas, the Spanish Ambassador in Washington DC.
- Blanca Portillo as Zeta.
- Indy Lewis as Amy Wild.
- Alfonso Lara as Mazas.

== Production ==
La Fortuna is an adaptation of the graphic novel El tesoro del Cisne Negro, by Paco Roca y Guillermo Corral, who were not directly involved in the screenplay. The miniseries was produced by Movistar+ together with AMC Studios, in collaboration with MOD Producciones. Directed by Alejandro Amenábar, it is the latter's television debut. Amenábar co-wrote the screenplay with Alejandro Hernández. It comprises 6 episodes each with a running time of around 45 minutes. Movistar+ released the series in Spain, while AMC handled broadcast in the US, Canada, the Caribbean and Latin America.

After 5 months of shooting, the part of the filming located in Spain was wrapped up in January 2021. Shooting locations in Spain included the Madrid region (including the Moncloa Palace), the province of Cádiz (including La Línea, Algeciras and Naval Station Rota), Guadalajara, A Coruña and Zaragoza. Filming wrapped in Spain on 27 April 2021. In August 2021, Movistar+ announced the premiere date of the first two episodes, slated for 30 September 2021. The series was presented by Amenábar at the 69th San Sebastián International Film Festival.

== Awards and nominations ==
Year	Award	Category	Nominee(s)	Result	Ref.
2021	27th Forqué Awards	Best Fiction Series		Nominated	
2021	27th Forqué Awards	Best Actress (TV series)	Ana Polvorosa	Nominated	
2021	27th Forqué Awards	Best Actor (TV series)	Álvaro Mel	Nominated	
2022	9th Feroz Awards	Best Drama Series		Nominated	
2022	9th Feroz Awards	Best Main Actress in a Series	Ana Polvorosa	Nominated	
2022	9th Feroz Awards	Best Supporting Actor in a Series	Karra Elejalde	Nominated	
2022	30th Actors and Actresses Union Awards	Best Television Actor in a Secondary Role	Karra Elejalde	Nominated	

== See also ==
- Nuestra Señora de las Mercedes
