= Veki Velilla =

Spanish actress

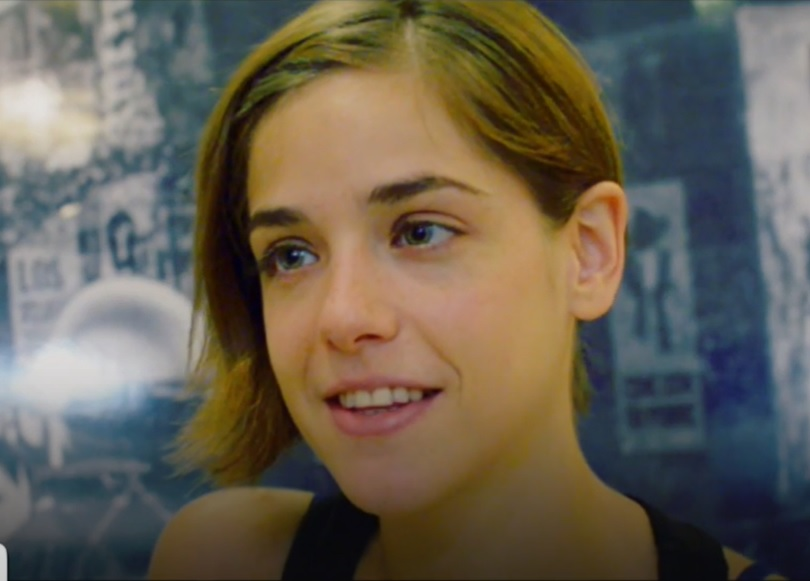
Velilla in 2017

Verónica del Sol González Velilla (born 3 September 1995), better known as Veki Velilla, is a Spanish actress.

== Life and career ==
Valilla was born in Madrid in 1995. She initially attended university to study education science, but dropped out after realizing her passion for acting. She made her television debut in the series Anclados. It was followed by performances in television series such as Amar es para siempre (as Laura), Cathedral of the Sea, and Yrreal, and ¡García! (as inquisitive reporter Antonia). She also starred as Ángela Kuntz in the 2023 slasher film Killer Book Club.

== Filmography ==
=== Television ===
Year	Show	Role	Ref
2015	Anclados		
	Amar es para siempre	Laura Ortega	
2018	Cathedral of the Sea		
2021	Yrreal	Elena	
2022	¡García!	Antonia	
