= T'Nia Miller =

British actress (born 1985)

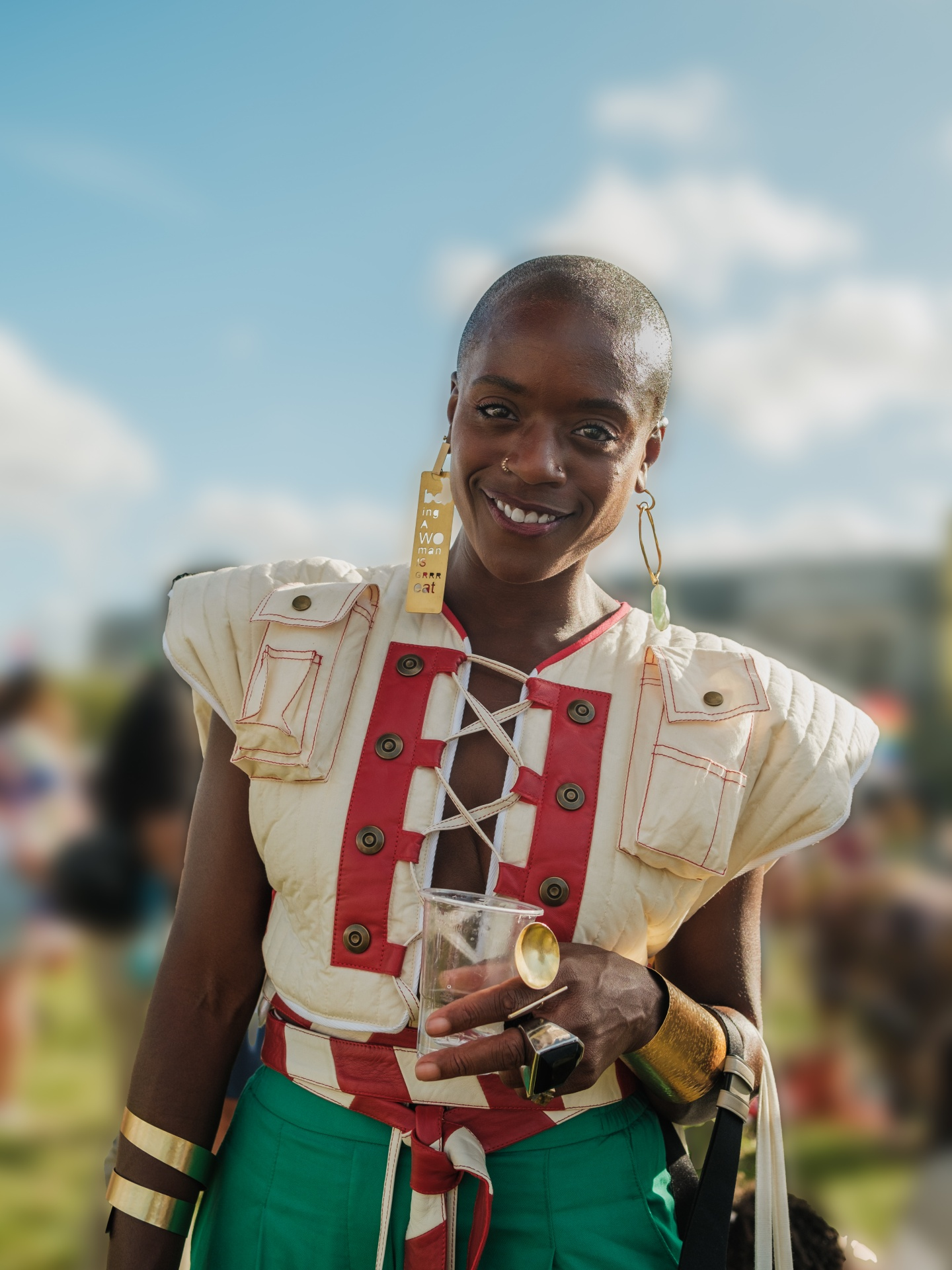
- Miller in August 2023
- Born: 2 March 1985 (age 41); London, England
- Occupation: Actress
- Years active: 2007–present
- Children: 2

T'Nia Miller (born 2 March 1985) is an English actress. She is known for her roles in television such as Witless (2016–2018), Years and Years (2019), Free Rein (2019), The Haunting of Bly Manor (2020), Foundation (2021), The Fall of the House of Usher (2023), and VisionQuest (2026).

== Early life ==
T'Nia Miller was born in London on 2 March 1985. She has Jamaican ancestry and grew up in East London. She graduated from the Guildford School of Acting in 2004.

== Career ==
In 2007, Miller made her acting debut in three episodes of the Channel 4 drama series Dubplate Drama. She then made appearances in The Bill and Holby City, before her first starring role as JJ in the 2012 feature film Stud Life. After making guest appearances in British television series such as Babylon, Banana, Cucumber, Doctor Who, Guilt and Born to Kill, Miller scored her first starring role as DC Wilton in the BBC Three thriller series Witless, a role she played from 2016 to 2018.

In June 2017, Miller appeared in an episode of the BBC One soap opera Doctors as Bev Lomax. In 2019, Miller was cast in the BBC drama miniseries Years and Years as Celeste Bisme-Lyons. Years and Years was created by Russell T Davies, whom Miller had worked with on the Channel 4 programmes Banana and Cucumber. In 2019, she appeared in the Netflix series Free Rein as Claire Wright. In 2020, Miller appeared in the Netflix series Sex Education as Maxine Tarrington, and later in the year, she starred in the Netflix series The Haunting of Bly Manor as Hannah Grose. In 2021, Miller starred in the AMC series La Fortuna as Susan McLean and in the Apple TV+ series Foundation as Zephyr Halima Ifa.

== Personal life ==
Miller is a lesbian. She is divorced and has two children.

In May 2019, Miller said of her trademark shaved head:

I used to hide behind my hair all the time. I had this long, relaxed hair, and I was thinking, "What am I trying to say? What is that about?" It sort of was a lightbulb moment, and I said, "You know what? I'm gonna cut it off. I [will] start from ground zero and grow an afro." I was sitting in the barber shop, and he cut my hair and I fell in love with my skull... and I never turned back. And actually, it's afforded me to be able to play a diverse range of roles—it had totally the opposite effect that I feared. Where I thought I'd be very limited to what I'd be seen for, it's done the opposite. So this was born out of an integrity of loving the self and not having to hide, and loving the fact that I'm an African.

== Filmography ==
=== Films ===
Year	Title	Role	Notes
2007	True to Form	DS Morgan	Short film
2008	The Disappeared	Doctor	
2009	Deadside	Malika Mason	Short film
2012	Stud Life	JJ	
2018	Obey	Chelsea	
2019	Nine Nights	Sylvie Johnson	
2020	Good Thanks, You?	Constable Stone	Short film
2023	Daylight Rules	Jenn	Short film
2023	Gargoyle Doyle	Narrator / Dragon (voice)	Short film
2026	Bury Your Gays	The Agent	Short film

=== Television ===
Year	Title	Role	Notes
2007	Dubplate Drama	Nadine	3 episodes
2007	The Bill	Mrs. Wakeford	Episode: "Uncut Killer"
2011	Holby City	Fran Connolly	Episode: "PS Elliot"
2014	Babylon	Meeting Mother	Episode: "1.6"
2015	Banana	Kay	Episode: "1.6"
2015	Cucumber	Kay	2 episodes
2015	Doctor Who	The General	Episode: "Hell Bent"
2016–2018	Witless	DC Wilton	10 episodes
2016–2018	Marcella	Aleesha	3 episodes
2016	Guilt	Helen Harris	3 episodes
2016	Hollyoaks	Miss Dobson	3 episodes
2017	Death in Paradise	Judith Dawson	Episode: "Murder in the Polls"
2017	Born to Kill	Lisa	Episode: "1.1"
2017	Doctors	Bev Lomax	Episode: "Distractions"
2018	Silent Witness	DI Gibbs	2 episodes
2018	Dark Heart	Gail Watkins	Episode: "1.1"
2019	Hatton Garden	WDC Laura McIntyre	2 episodes
2019	Years and Years	Celeste Bisme-Lyons	6 episodes
2019	Free Rein	Claire Wright	9 episodes
2019	The Feed	Charlie Morris	4 episodes
2020	Sex Education	Maxine Tarrington	2 episodes
2020	The Haunting of Bly Manor	Hannah Grose	8 episodes
2021	La Fortuna	Susan McLean	5 episodes
2021	Foundation	Zephyr Halima Ifa	3 episodes
2022	Doctor Who: The Lost Stories	Eileen Maitland (voice)	Episode: "Mind of the Hodiac"
2022	The Peripheral	Cherise	8 episodes
2023	The Diplomat	Cecilia Dennison	2 episodes
2023	The Fall of the House of Usher	Victorine LaFourcade	8 episodes
2025	Gangs of London	Mayor Simone Thearle	6 episodes
2025	The Mighty Nein	Vess DeRogna (voice)	3 episodes
2026	VisionQuest	Dr. Josephine "Jo" Carrington / Jocasta	6 episodes
