= A Perfect Story =

Spanish romantic comedy television miniseries

- Promotional release poster
- Spanish: Un cuento perfecto
- Based on: Un cuento perfecto by Elísabet Benavent
- Written by: Marina Pérez
- Directed by: Chloé Wallace
- Starring: Anna Castillo; Álvaro Mel
- Country of origin: Spain
- Original language: Spanish
- No. of seasons: 1
- No. of episodes: 5

Production
- Production company: Plano a Plano

Original release
- Network: Netflix
- Release: 28 July 2023

A Perfect Story (Spanish: Un cuento perfecto) is a Spanish romantic comedy television miniseries based on the novel by Elísabet Benavent. It stars Anna Castillo and Álvaro Mel. It was released on Netflix on 28 July 2023.

== Plot ==
The plot follows the relationship between an heiress to a hotel & resort empire Margot and multi-tasker David.

== Cast ==
- Anna Castillo as Margot
- Álvaro Mel as David
- Lydia Pavón as Idoia
- Mario Ermito as Filippo
- Jimmy Castro as Iván
- Tai Fati as Domi
- Ana Belén as Margarita
- Lourdes Hernández as Patricia
- Ingrid García-Jonsson as Candela
- Ane Gabarain
- Elena Irureta

== Production ==
An adaptation of the 2020 novel Un cuento perfecto by Elísabet Benavent, the series was written by Marina Pérez and directed by Chloé Wallace. It was produced by Plano a Plano for Netflix. Shooting locations included Greece and Madrid.

== Release ==
The five-episode miniseries was released on Netflix on 28 July 2023.

== Reception ==
Joel Keller of Decider.com gave the series a positive review, deeming it to be "a light romantic story with two charming leads, which is what makes it very watchable".

Pere Solà Gimferrer of La Vanguardia assessed that the series "shows an absolute lack of respect for the romantic comedy [genre]".
