= Colegas (TV series) =

Spanish television series

- Genre: Dramedy
- Directed by: Peris Romano
- Starring: Manuel Feijóo; Julián González; Lara de Miguel; Fernando Gil; Marta Solaz
- Country of origin: Spain
- Original language: Spanish
- No. of seasons: 1
- No. of episodes: 6

Production
- Running time: 20 min (approx.)
- Production companies: RTVE Digital; Hill Valley Producciones

Original release
- Network: playz
- Release: 30 October 2017 – 13 March 2018

Colegas is a Spanish dramedy streaming television series directed by Peris Romano which stars Manuel Feijóo, Julián González, Lara de Miguel, Fernando Gil and Marta Solaz, among others. Produced by RTVE Digital and Hill Valley Producciones, it was released from 2017 to 2018 on playz.

== Premise ==
The fiction, a dramedy, tracks a group of people who reunite 20 years after becoming popular as performers in a fictional television series, Colegas. It makes recurring nods to teen drama titles such as Compañeros or Al salir de clase, in which the real-life actors who perform exaggerated version of themselves actually starred.

== Cast ==
Main

- Manuel Feijóo as Manu.
- Julián González as Julián
- Daniel Huarte as Dani
- Rafa Reaño as Rafa
- Lara de Miguel as Lara
- Fernando Gil as Fernando Will.i.am Gil.
- Marta Solaz as Marta
- Soy una pringada, as Patetic-girl.
- Javi Coll as Rasty Palacios.
- Enrique Villén as Villén, Manu's manager.
- Rodrigo Poisón as Machete.
- Fernandisco.

Other and cameos

- Antonio Hortelano as Señor Romano.
- Víctor Clavijo
- Lucía Jiménez
- Eva Santolaria.
- William Miller.

== Production and release ==
Produced by RTVE Digital in collaboration with Hill Valley Producciones, Colegas was shot in locations across the Madrid region and the province of Ávila. Directed by Peris Romano, it consists of 6 episodes with a running time of around 20 minutes. RTVE released the pilot on 30 October 2017, as part of the launch of the Playz platform together with the release of the pilots of Dorien and Mambo. The broadcasting run resumed on 13 February 2018, with a weekly release on Tuesday.

Series	Episodes	Originally released		
Series	Episodes	First released	Last released	Network
1	6	30 October 2017	13 March 2018	playz
