= Grasa (TV series) =

Spanish streaming television series

- Official poster (Season 1)
- Genre: Dramedy
- Written by: David Sainz
- Directed by: David Sainz
- Starring: Kike Pérez
- Country of origin: Spain
- Original language: Spanish
- No. of seasons: 2
- No. of episodes: 12

Production
- Production locations: Seville, Dos Hermanas, Matalascañas
- Running time: 23–39 min
- Production companies: RTVE; Diffferent Entertainment

Original release
- Network: RTVE Play (playz)
- Release: 12 May 2020

Grasa (transl. 'Fat') is a Spanish dramedy streaming television series written and directed by David Sainz which stars Kike Pérez in the leading role. Produced by RTVE and Diffferent Entertainment, it premiered on Playz in 2020.

== Premise ==
Set in Seville, the fiction follows the life of Pedro Marrero, aka "El Grasa", an overweight criminal with an unhealthy lifestyle who has a heart attack and then decides to radically change his life in order to improve on his health condition and stay alive.

== Cast ==
- Kike Pérez as Pedro Marrero, "El Grasa"
- Octavi Pujades
- Antonio Dechent
- Diego Villalba
- Lamberto Guerra
- Fede Martínez
- Víctor Hubara
- Luifer Rodríguez as Tito
- Ana Caldas
- Mercedes Hoyos
- Adrián Pino
- Ken Appledorn
- Mila Fernández as Estefanía

Introduced in season 2

- José Manuel Poga as El Fati
- Elisa Drabben
- Jairo Sánchez
- Delia Santana
- Antonio Velázquez as Rafa

== Production and release ==
Produced by RTVE in collaboration with Diffferent Entertainment, shooting of the first season took place in Seville in 2019. Grasa was written and directed by David Sainz. Consisting of 6 episodes featuring a running time of around 25 minutes, the series debuted on Playz on 12 May 2020. With around 2,600,000 reproductions of season 1, filming of season 2 had already started in March 2021. It took place in between Dos Hermanas and Matalascañas. RTVE set the release date of the full 6-episode season 2 for 27 September 2021.

| Series | Episodes | Originally released | | | Ref. |
| Series | Episodes | First released | Last released | Network | Ref. |
|---|---|---|---|---|---|
| 1 | 6 | 12 May 2020 | 9 June 2020 | playz/RTVE Play | |
| 2 | 6 | 27 September 2021 | | playz/RTVE Play | |

| No. overall | No. in season | Title | Directed by | Written by | Original release date |
|---|---|---|---|---|---|
| 1 | 1 | "Barrio" | David Sainz | David Sainz | 12 May 2020 |
| 2 | 2 | "Nuevo Mundo" | David Sainz | David Sainz | 12 May 2020 |
| 3 | 3 | "Fleshvice" | David Sainz | David Sainz | 19 May 2020 |
| 4 | 4 | "Bruja paya" | David Sainz | David Sainz | 26 May 2020 |
| 5 | 5 | "Revisión mensual" | David Sainz | David Sainz | 2 June 2020 |
| 6 | 6 | "Otro barrio" | David Sainz | David Sainz | 9 June 2020 |

| No. overall | No. in season | Title | Directed by | Written by | Original release date |
|---|---|---|---|---|---|
| 7 | 1 | "Cebras" | David Sainz | David Sainz | 27 September 2021 |
| 8 | 2 | "El primer día" | David Sainz | David Sainz | 27 September 2021 |
| 9 | 3 | "Leones" | David Sainz | David Sainz | 27 September 2021 |
| 10 | 4 | "El último día" | David Sainz | David Sainz | 27 September 2021 |
| 11 | 5 | "La gasolinera" | David Sainz | David Sainz | 27 September 2021 |
| 12 | 6 | "Despedidas" | David Sainz | David Sainz | 27 September 2021 |
