= The Lady's Companion =

2025 Spanish comedy-drama TV series

- Promotional release poster
- Spanish: Manual para señoritas
- Created by: Gema R. Neira; María José Rustarazo
- Directed by: Carlos Sedes; Claudia Pinto
- Starring: Nadia de Santiago; Álvaro Mel; Isa Montalbán
- Country of origin: Spain
- Original language: Spanish
- No. of seasons: 1
- No. of episodes: 8

Production
- Executive producer: Gema R. Neira
- Producer: Ramón Campos
- Production company: Bambú Producciones

Original release
- Network: Netflix
- Release: 28 March 2025

The Lady's Companion (Spanish: Manual para señoritas, lit. 'Handbook for young ladies') is a Spanish comedy-drama television series created by Gema R. Neira and María José Rustarazo. It stars Nadia de Santiago, Álvaro Mel, and Isa Montalbán.

It is set in an indeterminate historical era somewhat akin to the Madrid of the novelist Benito Pérez Galdós (Madrid galdosiano).

== Plot ==
The plot follows chaperone Elena Bianda, as she is hired by Don Pedro Mencía on a trial basis to supervise his three unmarried daughters (Cristina, Sara, and Carlota).

== Cast ==
- Nadia de Santiago as Elena Bianda
- Álvaro Mel as Santiago
- Isa Montalbán as Cristina
- Zoe Bonafonte as Sara
- Iratxe Emparán as Carlota
- Tristán Ulloa as Pedro Mencía
- Carloto Cotta as Gabriel
- Paula Usero as Josefina
- Candela Pradas as Esther Zapico
- María Barranco as Doña Paquita
- Itziar Manero as Adela
- Nicolás Illoro as Lázaro
- Iván Lapadula as Eduardo
- Maria Caballero as Alicia
- Gracia Olayo as Doña Angustias
- Teresa de Mera
- Daniel Ibáñez

== Episodes ==
| No. | Original title in Spanish | English title | Director | Writer(s) | Original release date |
|---|---|---|---|---|---|
| 1 | Lección 1: Prohibido enamorarse | Lesson 1: Never Fall in Love | Carlos Sedes | Gema R. Neira, María José Rustarazo, Salvador S. Molina, Paula Fernández and Curro Serrano | 28 March 2025 |
| 2 | Lección 2: No contar mentiras | Lesson 2: Do Not Tell Lies | Carlos Sedes | Gema R. Neira, María José Rustarazo, Salvador S. Molina, Sara Alquézar and Ricardo Jornet | 28 March 2025 |
| 3 | Lección 3: El pasado, pasado está | Lesson 3: The Past Is in the Past | Carlos Sedes | Gema R. Neira, María José Rustarazo, Salvador S. Molina and Sara Alquézar | 28 March 2025 |
| 4 | Lección 4: Alejar la tentación | Lesson 4: Ward Off Temptation | Claudia Pinto Emperador | Gema R. Neira, María José Rustarazo, Salvador S. Molina and Sara Alquézar | 28 March 2025 |
| 5 | Lección 5: No traicionar a tu señorita | Lesson 5: Stay True to Your Lady | Claudio Pinto Emperador | Gema R. Neira, María José Rustarazo, Salvador S. Molina and Sara Alquézar | 28 March 2025 |
| 6 | Lección 6: Tus deseos no son prioridad | Lesson 6: Your Desires Come Second | Carlos Sedes | Gema R. Neira, María José Rustarazo, Salvador S. Molina and Sara Alquézar | 28 March 2025 |
| 7 | Lección 7: Mantener las buenas formas | Lesson 7: Maintain Proper Decorum | Carlos Sedes | Gema R. Neira, María José Rustarazo, Salvador S. Molina and Sara Alquézar | 28 March 2025 |
| 8 | Lección 8: Hacer feliz a tu señorita | Lesson 8: Make Your Lady Happy | Carlos Sedes | Gema R. Neira, María José Rustarazo, Salvador S. Molina and Sara Alquézar | 28 March 2025 |

== Production ==
Created by Gema R. Neira and María José Rustarazo, the series is a Bambú Producciones production. Carlos Sedes and Claudia Pinto Emperador took over direction duties.

== Release ==
The 8-episode series debuted on Netflix on 28 March 2025.

In May 2025, Netflix Spain announced that the series was cancelled after the release of season one.

== Reception ==
Pere Solà Gimferrer of La Vanguardia lamented that everything is fake ("impostado") and that Nadia de Santiago goes too far in breaking the fourth wall to tell the viewer what they already see with their own eyes.

HobbyConsolas gave the series 70 points ('good'), citing the "light-hearted tone of the narrative, the charisma of the protagonist and the effort of the production design" as positive elements.

== See also ==
- 2025 in Spanish television
