= Ruth Núñez =

Spanish actress

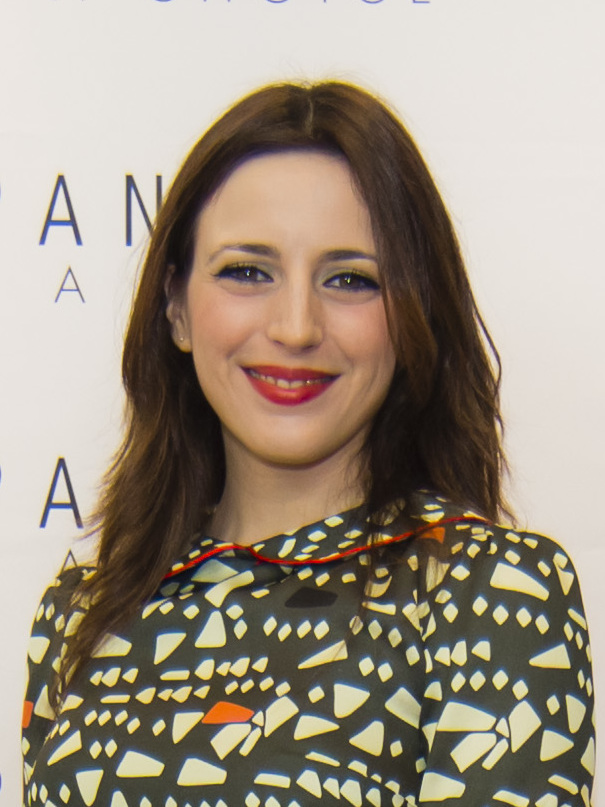
- Born: Ruth Núñez; 7 April 1979 (age 47); Nerja, Málaga, Andalucía, Spain
- Occupation: Actress
- Years active: 1998–present
- Partner: Alejandro Tous (2006–2018)(Separated)

Ruth Núñez (born 7 April 1979) is a Spanish actress. She is perhaps the best known for her television roles of Bosnian girl Tanja Mitjović in Compañeros (1998–01) and Beatriz "Bea" Pérez Pinzón in Yo soy Bea (2006–08), the Spanish version of Ugly Betty. In 2016, she had a cast appearance with Andrea Duro in the ninth season of La que se avecina.

From 2006 until 2018 she dated Alejandro Tous.

== Filmography ==
| Year | Title | Format | Role | Notes |
|---|---|---|---|---|
| 1998–01 | Compañeros | Series | Tanja Mitjović | |
| 1998 | Periodistas | Series | Aurora | |
| 1999 | Lencería de ocasión | Film | Luisa | Málaga Spanish Film Festival Special Mention Award |
| 2000 | Yoyes | Film | Bego | |
| 2000 | Hospital Central | Series | Laura Páez | |
| 2000 | Adiós con el corazón | Film | Doncella | |
| 2001 | No te fallaré | Film | Tanja | |
| 2002 | Policías, en el corazón de la calle | Series | Estrella | |
| 2003 | Dejavu | Short film | | |
| 2003 | El pantano | Series | Herminia | |
| 2004 | NatamotoF | Film | | |
| 2004 | El comisario | Series | Olga Monforte | |
| 2006–08 | Yo soy Bea | Series | Beatriz "Bea" Pérez Pinzón | Nominated — Fotogramas de Plata for Best TV Actress; Nominated — Spanish Actors Union Award for Female Lead Performance on Television; Nominated — TP de Oro for Best Actress; Nominated — Zapping Award for Best Actress |
| 2006 | Mi querido Klikowsky | Series | Beatriz "Bea" Pérez Pinzón | |

== Awards and nominations ==
| Year | Award | Category | Title | Result | Ref. |
|---|---|---|---|---|---|
| 1999 | Málaga Spanish Film Festival | Special Mention | Lencería de ocasión | Won | |
| 2007 | Fotogramas de Plata | Best TV Actress | Yo soy Bea | Nominated | |
| 2007 | Spanish Actors Union | Female Lead Performance on Television | Yo soy Bea | Nominated | |
| 2007 | TP de Oro | Best Actress | Yo soy Bea | Nominated | |
| 2007 | Zapping Awards | Best Actress | Yo soy Bea | Nominated | |
| 2008 | Spanish Actors Union | Female Lead Performance on Television | Yo soy Bea | Nominated | |
