= Ander Puig =

Spanish actor

- Born: July 2, 2001 (age 25); Barcelona, Spain
- Occupation: Actor
- Years active: 2021–present

Ander Puig Marsol (born Barcelona, July 2, 2001) is a Spanish actor, best known for his work as the character Nico in the sixth to eighth seasons of the Netflix series Elite.

== Biography ==
Puig was born in Barcelona in 2001. He first came out as a transgender man at age 17.

He started his professional acting career in 2021, in the Movistar Plus+ series Alive and Kicking. Later, he also played the protagonist in the RTVE webseries Ser o No Ser.

After that, he was selected for a role in the television series Elite, beginning in the sixth season. He plays a trans man named Nico.

== Filmography ==
Year	Title	Character	Broadcaster	Notes
2021	Los espabilados (Alive and Kicking)		Movistar Plus+	7 episodes
2022 - present	Ser o no ser (To Be or Not to Be)	Joel	Playz	12 episodes
2022 - 2024	Élite (Elite)	Nico	Netflix	24 episodes
