= Compañeros (TV series) =

- Genre: Teen drama
- Created by: Manuel Valdivia
- Theme music composer: Daniel Sánchez de la Hera
- Opening theme: No te fallaré
- Country of origin: Spain
- Original language: Spanish
- No. of seasons: 9
- No. of episodes: 121

Production
- Production company: Globomedia

Original release
- Network: Antena 3
- Release: 25 March 1998 – 16 July 2002

Compañeros (lit. 'Companions') is a Spanish teen drama television series. Produced by Globomedia, it aired on Antena 3 from 1998 to 2002.

== Premise ==
The fiction follows the mishaps of a group of teenagers studying for the Bachillerato at the Instituto Azcona.

== Cast ==
- Eva Santolaria as Valle Bermejo.
- Antonio Hortelano as Quimi Verdet.
- Lara de Miguel as Sara Antón.
- Nicolás Belmonte as Eloy Rubio.
- Julián González as César Vallalta.
- Virginia Rodríguez as Isabel Arbueso.
- Ruth Núñez as Tanja Mijatovic.
- Duna Jové as Arancha Alberti.
- Daniel Retuerta as Lolo Bermejo Fuentes.
- Manuel Feijóo as Luismi Bárcenas.
- Clara Lago as Desirée.
- Miguel Rellán as Félix Torán.
- Francis Lorenzo as Alfredo Torán.
- María Garralón as Rocío.
- Beatriz Carvajal as Marisa Viñé.
- Cristina Peña as Jose.
- César Vea as Gustavo.
- David Janer as Martín.
- Begoña Maestre as Duna Belarde.
- Tina Sainz as Tere Roncesvalles.
- Mercè Pons as Ana.

== Production and release ==
The series premiered on 25 March 1998. Produced by Globomedia and created by Manuel Valdivia, the series was initially produced with a tight budget. It eventually became one of the most iconic Spanish fiction series. The broadcasting run, comprising 121 episodes and 9 seasons, ended on 16 July 2002.

Compañeros sparked a 2001 feature film spin-off, No te fallaré (transl. "I won't let you down"), titled after the series' popular opening theme, which was composed by Daniel Sánchez de la Hera and performed by Greta y Los Garbo, and then Los lunes que quedan and Marte Menguante. In 2018, Colegas, a spoof web series (paying homage to Compañeros and another popular teen drama series from the 1990s, Al salir de clase), featuring some actors from the series, was broadcast on Playz.
