= Killer Book Club =

- Promotional release poster
- Spanish: El club de los lectores criminales
- Directed by: Carlos Alonso
- Screenplay by: Carlos García Miranda
- Based on: El club de los lectores criminales by Carlos García Miranda
- Starring: Veki Velilla; Álvaro Mel; Iván Pellicer; Hamza Zaidi; Ane Rot; Priscilla Delgado; María Cerezuela; Carlos Alcaide
- Music by: Arnau Bataller
- Production company: Brutal Media
- Distributed by: Netflix
- Release date: 25 August 2023
- Country: Spain
- Language: Spanish

Killer Book Club (Spanish: El club de los lectores criminales) is a 2023 Spanish slasher film directed by Carlos Alonso from a screenplay by Carlos García Miranda based on the novel by García Miranda which stars Veki Velilla.

== Plot ==
After the accidental killing of a lecturer, a group of college students keen on horror fiction film and literature agree on a pact of silence, but a masked killer clown takes them down one by one.

== Cast ==
- Veki Velilla as Ángela
- Álvaro Mel as Sebas
- Iván Pellicer as Nando
- Ane Rot as Sara
- Carlos Alcaide as Rai
- Priscilla Delgado as Virginia
- María Cerezuela as Eva
- Hamza Zaidi as Koldo
- Daniel Grao as Antonio Cruzado

== Production ==
The script is based on the book El club de los lectores criminales by Carlos García Miranda. The film is a Brutal Media production. It was scored by Arnau Bataller. While the novel takes place in the Complutense University of Madrid, the film avoids any explicit mention to the setting, with footage otherwise shot in Toledo, in between the Faculty of Legal and Social Sciences of the University of Castilla-La Mancha and the Hospital de Tavera.

== Release ==
The film was released on Netflix on 25 August 2023.

== Reception ==
According to the review aggregation website Rotten Tomatoes, Killer Book Club has a 8% approval rating based on 12 reviews from critics, with an average rating of 4.2/10.

John Serba of Decider.com gave the film a negative recommendation, deeming it to be "just another brutal mediocrity among many".

David Lorao of HobbyConsolas rated the film with 62 points ('acceptable') writing that it is an "interesting Spanish slasher film that has a magnetic premise, but that fizzles out as its short running time progresses until it reaches an ending without much emotion".

Matt Donato of Bloody Disgusting lamented that "the story behind Killer Book Club feels more like an inorganic vanity project to see how close the production can replicate Scream without copyright infringement".

Chase Hutchinson of Collider gave the film a C− rating pointing out that it "relies on recycled tropes and contrivances of the genre, feeling most like a ripoff of Scream".

== See also ==
- List of Spanish films of 2023
