= Elísabet Benavent =

Spanish writer

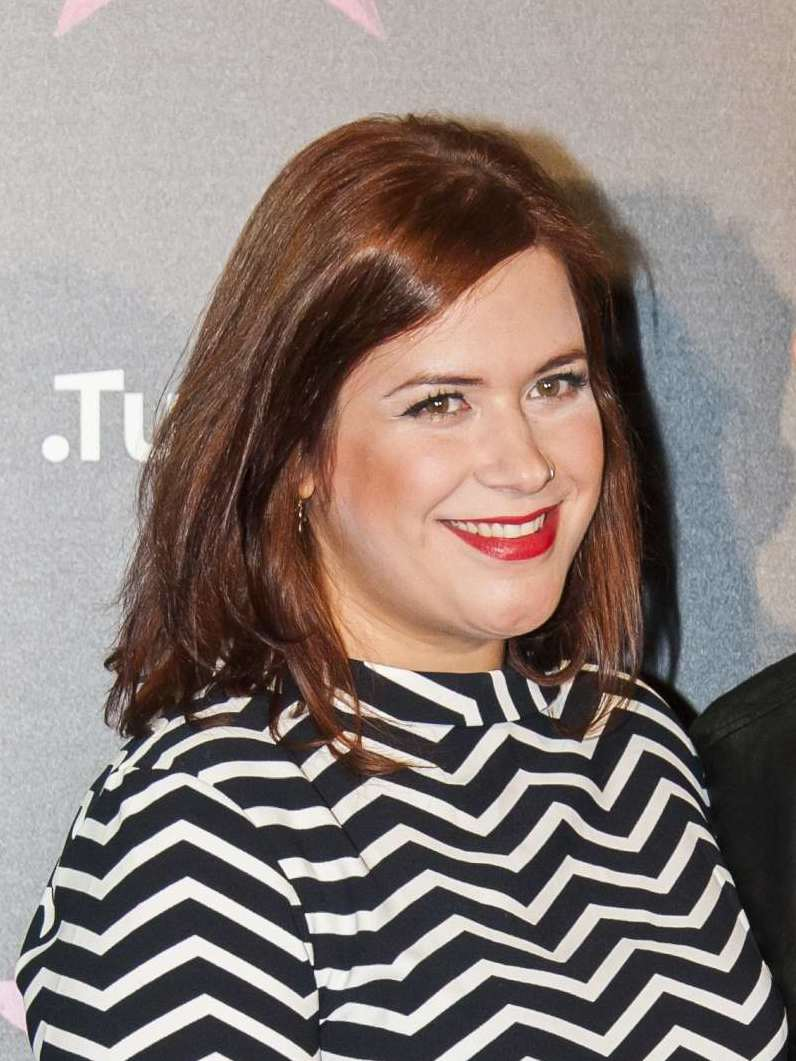
Elisabet Benavent (2015)

Elísabet Benavent (known in her social networks as Betacoqueta; Gandia, 1984) is a Valencian writer, positioned as one of the most relevant writers of romance novels. She began her literary career with self-publishing her first book, En los zapatos de Valeria (2013). Her work is considered a success in more than 10 countries. Among all her publications, Benavent has sold around 3,000,000 copies. All of her novels have been published by Suma de letras, an imprint of Penguin Random House. Benavent's Valeria saga became a 2020 Netflix TV series, (Valeria), and her novel, Un cuento perfecto, was remade into a Netflix's 2023 television miniseries, A Perfect Story.

== Early life and education ==
Her fondness for books began at a very young age. She does not know exactly how she began to write. She studied Audiovisual Communication at the CEU Cardinal Herrera University in Valencia. Later, she earned a master's degree at the Complutense University of Madrid in Communication and Art.

== Career ==
A few months after self-publishing her book En los zapatos de Valeria (2013) on the internet, Suma Publishing published the novel as the first book in the Valeria saga, which was continued by Valeria in the espejo (2013), Valeria en blanco y negro (2013), Valeria al desnudo (2013) and finally, El diario de Lola (2015). The success of the saga led it to be premiered in 2020 on Netflix in a series based on these novels that deal with the life of a group of friends.

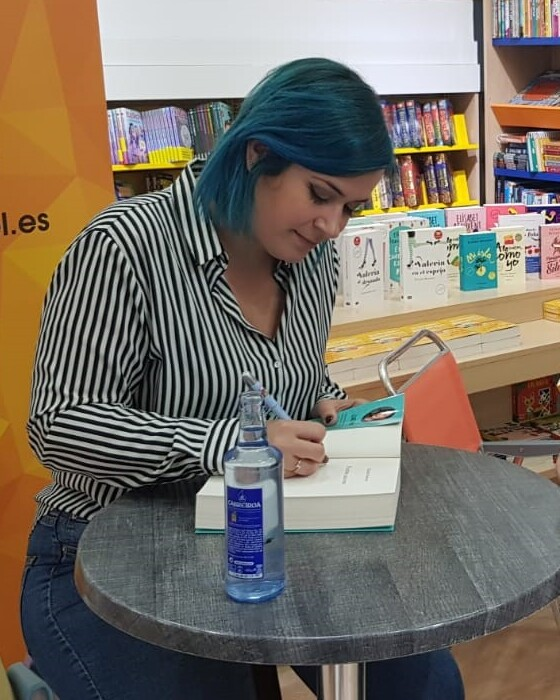
(2019)

In 2014, she released Mi elección, a trilogy made up of Alguien que no soy (2014), Alguien como tú (2015), and Alguien como yo (2015), as well as Silvia (2014), a biography made up of Persiguiendo a Silvia and Encontrando a Silvia. In 2017, came Mi isla and another series entitled Horizonte Martina which includes the titles Martina con vistas and Martina en tierra firme. In 2019, she published Toda la verdad de mis mentiras, and in 2020, Un cuento perfecto, with Netflix confirming in 2021 that a series will be made based on this story, dealing with two very different characters who have an immediate connection.

Benavent published El arte de engañar al karma in 2021, and Todas esas cosas que te diré mañana in 2022. In Los abrazos lentos (2022), Benavent talks about some reflections, poetic prose, and short stories.

== Selected works ==
=== Sagas ===
==== En los zapatos de Valeria ====
- En los zapatos de Valeria (2013)
- Valeria en el espejo (2013)
- Valeria en blanco y negro (2013)
- Valeria al desnudo (2013)
- El diario de Lola (2015, Penguin Random House)

==== Mi elección ====
- Alguien que no soy (2014)
- Alguien como tú (2015)
- Alguien como yo (2015)
- Tras las huellas de Alba, Hugo y Nico (2016, Suma de letras)

=== Sequels ===
==== Silvia ====
- Persiguiendo a Silvia (2014)
- Encontrando a Silvia (2014)
- Epílogo

==== Horizonte Martina ====
- Martina con vistas al mar (2016)
- Martina en tierra firme (2016)

==== Sofía ====
- La magia de ser Sofía (2017)
- La magia de ser nosotros (2017)

==== Canciones y Recuerdos ====
- Fuimos canciones (2018, Suma)
- Seremos Recuerdos (2018, Suma)

=== Other novels ===
- Mi isla (2017)
- Este cuaderno es para mí (2017)
- Toda la verdad de mis mentiras (2019)
- Un cuento perfecto (2020)
- El arte de engañar al karma (2021)
- Todas esas cosas que te diré mañana (2022)
- Como (no) escribí nuestra historia (2023)
- Esnob (2024)

=== Other publications ===
- Este cuaderno es para mí (2017)
- Los abrazos lentos (2022)
