= Not Such an Easy Life =

- Promotional film poster
- Spanish: Una vida no tan simple
- Directed by: Félix Viscarret
- Screenplay by: Félix Viscarret
- Starring: Miki Esparbé; Álex García; Ana Polvorosa; Olaya Caldera
- Cinematography: Óscar Durán
- Edited by: Victoria Lammers
- Music by: Mikel Salas
- Production companies: Lamia Producciones; A Contracorriente Films; Klingsor Films AIE
- Distributed by: A Contracorriente Films
- Release dates: 13 March 2023 (Málaga); 23 June 2023 (Spain)
- Country: Spain
- Language: Spanish

Not Such an Easy Life (Spanish: Una vida no tan simple) is a 2023 Spanish comedy-drama film directed by Félix Viscarret starring Miki Esparbé alongside Álex García, Ana Polvorosa, and Olaya Caldera.

== Plot ==
Exploring issues of parenting and mid-life crisis, the plot follows the plight of architect Isaías, struggling with the work–life interface, as he vies to raise his children.

== Cast ==
- Miki Esparbé as Isaías
- Álex García as Nico
- Ana Polvorosa as Sonia
- Olaya Caldera as Ainhoa
- Julián Villagrán
- Ramón Barea

== Production ==
The film was produced by Lamia Producciones, A Contracorriente Films, and Klingsor Films AIE. It had the participation of EiTB, Movistar+, and R Telecable and backing from ICAA, the Basque Government, and the Government of Navarre. Shooting locations included Bilbao and Getxo.

== Release ==
The film was presented at the 26th Málaga Film Festival on 13 March 2023. Distributed by A Contracorriente Films, it was released theatrically in Spain on 23 June 2023.

== Reception ==
Luis Martínez of El Mundo rated the film 3 out of 5 stars, describing it as a "delicate fable both sharp and clear-sighted without renouncing to be somewhat bitter and even subtly amusing".

Pere Vall of Fotogramas rated the film 4 out of 5 stars, highlighting "its smart and sensitive narration" and a "dazzling" Olaya Caldera as the best things about the film.

=== Top ten lists ===
The film appeared on a number of critics' top ten lists of the best Spanish films of 2023:

- 8th — Mondosonoro (consensus)

== Accolades ==
Year	Award	Category	Nominee(s)	Result	Ref.
2024	79th CEC Medals	Best Actor	Mike Esparbé	Nominated	
2024	38th Goya Awards	Best Original Screenplay	Félix Viscarret	Nominated	
2024	32nd Actors and Actresses Union Awards	Best Film Actor in a Minor Role	Álex García	Nominated	
2024	7th ALMA Awards	Best Screenplay in a Comedy Film	Félix Viscarret	Nominated	

== See also ==
- List of Spanish films of 2023
