= Ana Polvorosa =

Spanish actress

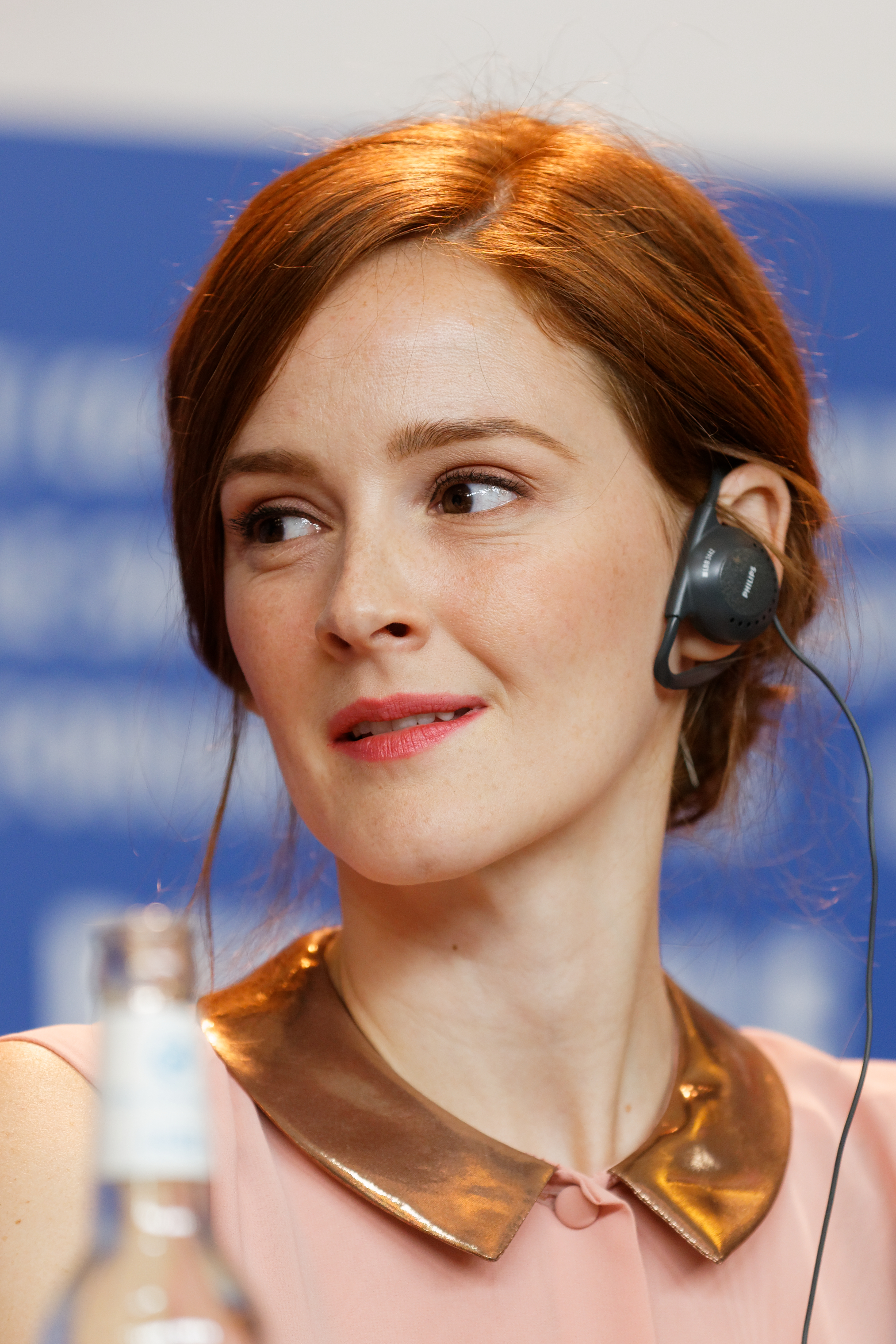
- Born: Ana María Ruiz Polvorosa; 14 December 1987 (age 38); Madrid, Spain
- Other names: Ana María Polvorosa; Ana María Ruiz; Ana Mª Ruiz
- Occupation: Actress
- Years active: 2000–present

Ana María Ruiz Polvorosa (born 14 December 1987) is a Spanish film, theatre and television actress. She became very popular to a television audience in Spain for her portrayal of Lore in sitcom Aída.

== Early life ==
Ana María Ruiz Polvorosa was born in Madrid on 14 December 1987. She first appeared in television in a couple of commercials and one episode of Nada es para siempre. At age 13, she landed her first stable role in television series Raquel busca su sitio.

== Career ==
Year	Title	Role	Notes	Ref.
2004	Escuela de seducción			
2007	Atasco en la nacional			
2009	Mentiras y gordas (Sex, Party and Lies)	Marina		
2011	No lo llames amor... llámalo X (Don't Call It Love… Call It XXX)	Lourdes		
2015	Mi gran noche (My Big Night)	Yanire		
2017	Pieles (Skins)	Samantha		
2021	Con quién viajas (Carpoolers)	Elisa		
2022	La piedad (Piety)	Marta		
2023	Una vida no tan simple (Not Such an Easy Life)	Sonia		
2024	Un mal día lo tiene cualquiera (Bad Hair Day)	Sonia		

=== Theatre work ===
Year	Title	Notes
2007	Olvida los tambores	Directed by Ana Diosdado

=== Television work ===
Year	Title	Role	Notes	Ref.
2000	Nada es para siempre		On the Antena 3 channel	
2000−01	Raquel busca su siti		On the TVE1 channel	
2002−03	Javier ya no vive solo		On the Telecinco channel	
2004	Ana y los 7		On the TVE 1 channel	
2005−12	Aída		On the Telecinco channel	
2005	Los recuerdos de Alicia		Television film	
2012−13	Fenómenos		On the Antena 3 channel	
2015−17	Amar es para siempre		On Antena 3, as Loli Real	
2017−20	Las chicas del cable (Cable Girls)	Sara Millán	Main role (42 episodes)	
2021	La Fortuna	Lucía		
2023	Tú también lo harías (You Would Do It Too)	Rebeca Quirós		
2024	La última noche en Tremor (The Last Night at Tremore Beach)	Judy		

=== Guest appearances ===
Title	Notes
Vergüenza Ajena: Made in Spain	MTV Spain
The Final Table	Netflix

== Accolades ==
Year	Award	Category	Work	Result	Ref.
2011	20th Actors and Actresses Union Awards	Best Television Actress in a Secondary Role	Aída	Won	
2018	5th Feroz Awards	Best Supporting Actress in a Series	Cable Girls	Nominated	
2018	27th Actors and Actresses Union Awards	Best Television Actress in a Secondary Role	Cable Girls	Won	
2021	27th Forqué Awards	Best Actress in a Series	La Fortuna	Nominated	
2022	9th Feroz Awards	Best Main Actress in a Series	La Fortuna	Nominated	
