= ¡García! =

- Genre: Action comedy; Science fiction; Political satire
- Created by: Sara Antuña; Carlos de Pando
- Based on: ¡García! by Santiago García & Luis Bustos
- Written by: Sara Antuña; Carlos de Pando
- Directed by: Eugenio Mira
- Starring: Francisco Ortiz; Veki Velilla; Curro Ortiz; Daniel Freire; Francisco Reyes; Silvia Abascal; Emilio Gutiérrez Caba; Lola Herrera
- Country of origin: Spain
- Original language: Spanish
- No. of seasons: 1
- No. of episodes: 6

Production
- Executive producers: Miguel Salvat; Steve Matthews; Antony Root
- Cinematography: Unax Mendia
- Production companies: Zeta Studios; García La Serie, S.L.

Original release
- Network: HBO Max
- Release: 28 October – 25 November 2022

¡García! (or García!) is a Spanish television series based on the graphic novel by Santiago García and Luis Bustos. Created by Sara Antuña and Carlos de Pando for HBO Max, it stars Francisco Ortiz and Veki Velilla. Eugenio Mira directed the 6 episodes.

== Premise ==
Set in a version of current-day Spain on the verge of societal collapse, the fiction follows Antonia, a reporter who accidentally unravels a decades-old plot concerning a super-agent created in the 1950s by the Francoist secret services, García, who was subsequently cryogenized. The latter, defrosted by Antonia, finds himself dazed and confused in current-day Spain.

== Cast ==
- Francisco Ortiz as García
- Veki Velilla as Antonia
- Daniel Freire as Neffenberg
- Francisco Reyes as Winters
- Emilio Gutiérrez Caba as Jaime Ortiz
- Silvia Abascal as Catalina Bellido "La Capitana"
- Lola Herrera as Feli
- Nico Romero as Riki
- Helio Pedregal as Barea
- Mario Pardo as Chencho
- Miki Molina as Benito
- Marina Gatell as Silvia
- Pepe Ocio as Hernando
- Diana Gómez as Feli joven/Julia
- Andrés Gertrúdix as Manolo

== Production ==
Created and written by Sara Antuña and Carlos de Pando (showrunners of The Neighbor), ¡García! is an adaptation of the eponymous graphic novel by Santiago García and Luis Bustos. The series is produced by García La Serie, S.L. (an ad-hoc production company linked to Zeta Studios) for WarnerMedia Original Programming.

The project, billed as a "satirical thriller with sci-fi elements", was greenlighted in May 2021. Miguel Salvat, Steve Matthews and Antony Root are credited as executive producers, whereas Eugenio Mira was charged with the direction of the 6 episodes comprising the season, set to feature a running time of around 60 minutes. Unax Mendia is the cinematography director. Shooting in Madrid had already begun on 7 May 2021.

Still in production, the project was showcased together with other HBO Max originals (Todo lo otro, Venga Juan and Sin novedad) at the 69th San Sebastián International Film Festival in September 2021. On 25 October 2021, HBO Max released a teaser video, announcing an intended release date for 2022.

== Release ==
The first two episodes made their world premiere at the Fantastic Fest in September 2022. They also screened at the 55th Sitges Film Festival. HBO Max released the first two episodes in 4K along with Dolby Vision and Dolby Atmos on 28 October 2022. A free-to-air release of the first episode on Spanish channel DMAX was also programmed for 28 October 2022.

== Reception ==
Raquel Hernández Luján of HobbyConsolas rated the show with 80 points ("very good"), praising its "agile storytelling, the committed cast, and its boundless aesthetic and musical ambition".

Pere Solà Gimferrer of La Vanguardia highlighted "an impeccable execution that knows how to recreate the adventurous spirit of Indiana Jones and the sense of action of the classic James Bond without renouncing to have its own identity".

In the United States, Decider's Johnny Loftus also wrote a positive review for the series, concluding: "Garcia! offers a gleeful riff on spy movies, and a grip of chase and fight scenes right out of the Indiana Jones adventure handbook. But it also has something to say about the shifting tides of contemporary politics, between democracy and fascism, and that push and pull isn’t exclusive to contemporary Spain."

== Accolades ==
Year	Award	Category	Nominee(s)	Result	Ref.
2023	28th Critics' Choice Awards	Best Foreign Language Series		Nominated	
2023	10th Feroz Awards	Best Drama Series		Nominated	
2023	10th Feroz Awards	Best Supporting Actor in a Series	Emilio Gutiérrez Caba	Nominated	
2023	31st Actors and Actresses Union Awards	Best Television Actor in a Minor Role	Luis Rallo	Nominated	
2023	31st Actors and Actresses Union Awards	Best Television Actor in a Minor Role	Arturo Querejeta	Nominated	
