= Vergüenza Ajena: Made in Spain =

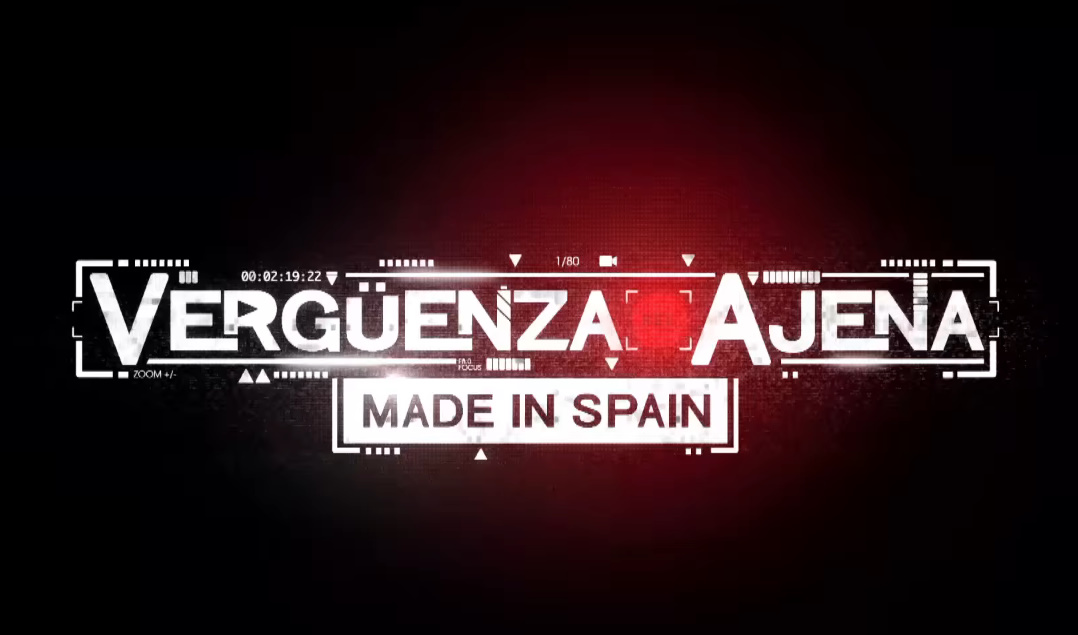
- Genre: Clip show Comedy
- Starring: Luis Fernández; Mbaka Oko; Corina Randazzo

Production
- Running time: 22 minutes

Original release
- Network: MTV Spain
- Release: May 9, 2016 – present

Vergüenza Ajena: Made in Spain is an American comedy clip show that began airing on May 9, 2016. It is hosted by Luis Fernández and co-hosted by Mbaka Oko and Corina Randazzo. Ridiculousness shows various viral videos from the Internet.

== Production ==
Viacom International Media Networks (VIMN)'s South Europe, Middle East and South Africa cluster produced five new versions of entertainment format Ridiculousness for local MTV channels.

The new programs will air on MTV Spain, MTV France, MTV Italy, MTV Africa and the MTV Netherlands and MTV Belgium.

The clip-show format first, Ridiculousness, aired on MTV in the US in 2011 and sees a regular studio team and guest stars commenting on viral 'fail' videos from the internet.

== Episodes ==
No.	Guest	Original release date
1	TBA	May 9, 2016
2	The Zombie Kids	May 9, 2016
3	Darmo	May 16, 2016
4	Mario Vaquerizo	May 16, 2016
5	Ana María Polvorosa	May 23, 2016
6	Fonsi Nieto	May 23, 2016
7	El Langui	May 30, 2016
8	Elena Furiase	June 6, 2016
9	Abraham	June 13, 2016
10	Aless Gibaja	June 20, 2016
11	TBA	June 27, 2016
12	Nacho Morata	July 4, 2016
