= Yrreal =

Spanish television series

- Genre: Action thriller
- Created by: Paula Sánchez; Alberto Utrera
- Directed by: Alberto Utrera
- Starring: Angy Fernández; Veki Velilla
- Country of origin: Spain
- Original language: Spanish
- No. of seasons: 1
- No. of episodes: 6

Production
- Executive producers: Eugenio Saavedra; Carlos Mochales; Patricia Alonso; Jennifer Jullien
- Running time: 25 min (approx.)
- Production companies: RTVE; MoA Studio

Original release
- Network: RTVE Play
- Release: 17 November 2021

Yrreal is a Spanish action thriller television series created by Alberto Utrera and Paula Sánchez for Playz which stars Angy Fernández and Veki Velilla. It premiered on 17 November 2021. The series blends live action footage with 2D animation.

== Premise ==
Two young women, Lucía and Elena, one striving for justice and the other one seeking vengeance, team up to dress in superhero costumes and then kidnap a prime suspect behind the disappearance of Elena's sister, only to find out that things do not come out as smoothly as expected.

== Cast ==
- Angy Fernández as Lucía
- Veki Velilla as Elena
- Eloy Azorín
- Albert Baró
- Silvia Vacas
- Iván Montes
- Nacho López
- Manuel Teodulo
- Paco Churruca
- Nacho Marraco

== Production and release ==
A creation by Paula Sánchez and Alberto Utrera, the project won the "Pitch Short-Form Series" prize awarded by Playz at the 4th Conecta Fiction Festival in September 2020 consisting on the contract for the development of the series. Produced by RTVE in collaboration with MoA Studio, shooting began by March 2021 in Madrid. The writing team was formed by Alberto Utrera, Paula López Cuervo, Carlos Soria, Paula Sánchez and Sofía Robledo. The series was directed by Alberto Utrera, while the 2D animation was created by Nuño Benito. Eugenio Saavedra, Carlos Mochales and Patricia Alonso were credited as executive producers on behalf of RTVE whereas Jennifer Jullien was credited as executive producer on behalf of MoA Studio. Consisting of 6 episodes featuring a running time of around 25 minutes, the first two episodes were pre-screened at the 5th Conecta Fiction Festival on 15 September 2021. A trailer was presented then. RTVE scheduled the release date on RTVE Play for 17 November 2021.
