= Kílian Sebrià Marsol =

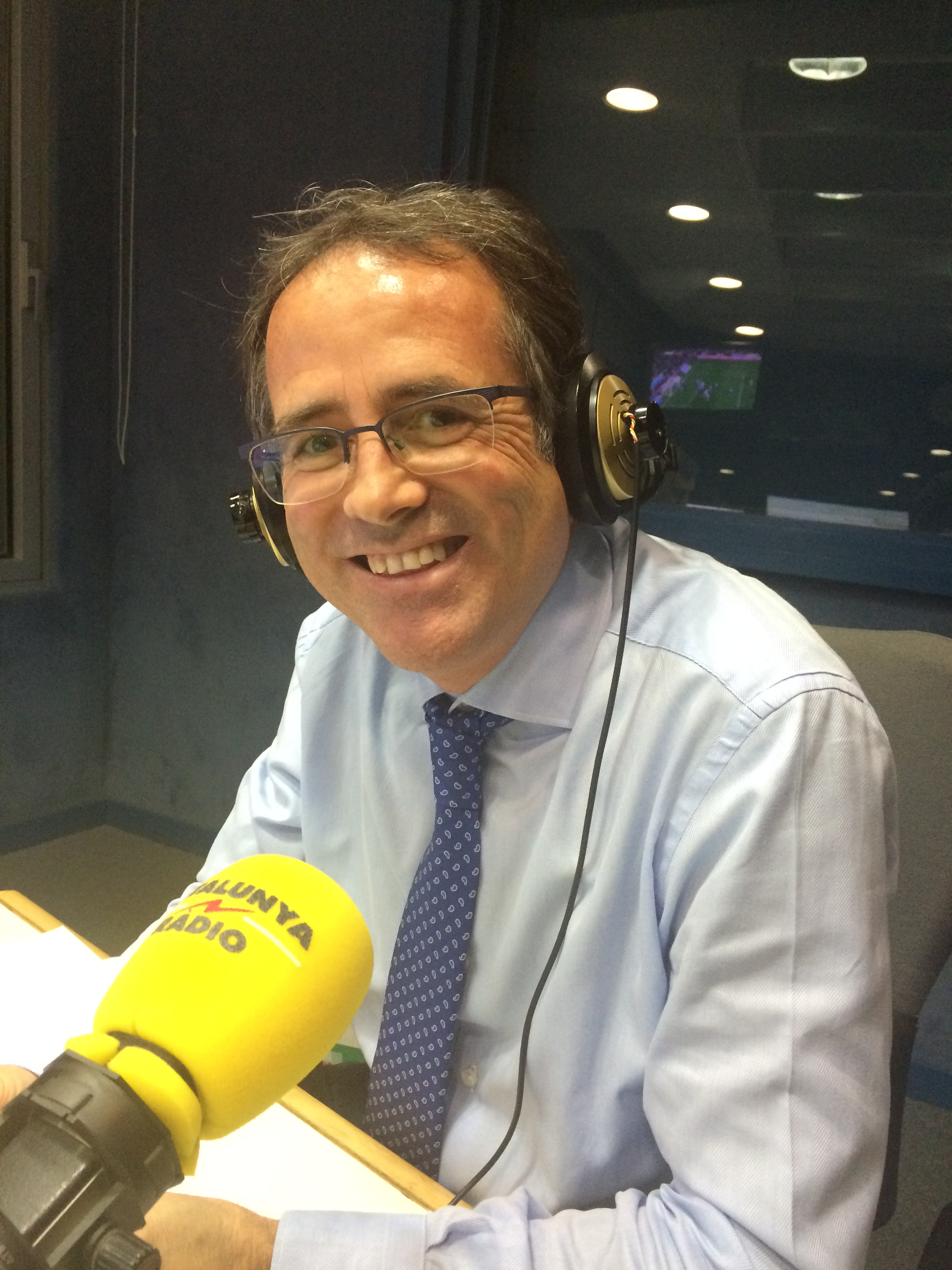
- Born: July 23, 1964 (age 61); Igualada, Catalonia
- Occupation(s): Journalist, radio presenter
- Employer: Catalunya Ràdio

Kílian Sebrià (born 23 July 1964 in Igualada) is a Catalan journalist. He has been a prominent figure in Catalonia's public radio, particularly on the Catalunya Ràdio network.

He is a lecturer at the Faculty of Communication Sciences at the Universitat Internacional de Catalunya (International University of Catalonia).

== Career at Catalunya Ràdio ==
Before becoming well known for his late-night broadcasting, he held several positions at the station: director of Informatiu Migdia, head of the politics section, correspondent in the United States, and one of the founders of the Catalunya Informació news channel.

For many years, he was the editor and presenter of the radio programme Catalunya vespre on Catalunya Ràdio, until the summer of 2023.

From September 2023, he began a new stage hosting the programme Sense fronteres on Catalunya Ràdio.

== Awards ==
He has received the Ondas Award in 2010 and the Ràdio Associació de Catalunya Awards in 2005 and 2014. In addition to his work at Catalunya Ràdio, he has also worked for Ràdio Nacional d'Espanya and Cadena 13.

== Other activities ==
In his early career, he commentated on Igualada Hoquei Club matches for more than 20 years. He is currently a member of the club's board of directors.
