= RTVE Play =

Spanish media service

rtve play
- Website type: OTT video streaming platform
- Predecessor: RTVE a la carta
- Area served: Spain (RTVE Play); Americas, Europe, Japan, India, Hong Kong, South Korea, and Australia (RTVE Play+)
- Owner: RTVE
- Website: www.rtve.es/play/
- Launched: 22 June 2021; 5 years ago

RTVE Play (often stylized as rtve play) is the over-the-top media service provided by the Spanish public broadcaster RTVE. It was launched in Spain on 22 June 2021, replacing the old catalogue 'RTVE a la carta', created in turn in 2008.

== History ==
The original online platform offering RTVE content was created in 2008 under the name RTVE a la carta or simply A la carta or alacarta. In late 2020, RTVE announced its intention to merge its A la carta service together with the embedded Playz streaming platform specifically dedicated to a young audience. The new service replacing alacarta in Spain was created on 22 June 2021 under the name 'RTVE Play'; the launch included the release of the beta app for smartphone and tablet.

Prior to the launch, RTVE did however offer its international streaming platform operating outside of Spain (launched in the Americas on 8 June 2020) already under the same name 'RTVE Play'. The pay international service available in the Americas was thus ensuingly rebranded to 'RTVE Play+' (a domestic pay model for RTVE is illegal in Spain as the Spanish public service is already paid by taxes).

Initially available without registration, RTVE slated the deadline date of 15 July 2021 for compulsory (yet free) registration on the RTVE Play app, reportedly in order to offer the user "a more personalized experience" and to be able to make recommendations.

Some of the earliest original programming set to release on RTVE Play include docuseries and/or Playz originals such as Edelweiss, Grasa (season 2), Susana y el sexo, Yrreal, Lucía en la telaraña, Ruiz-Mateos, el primer fenómeno viral or Raíces, to which a number of licensed international shows such as Unreal, Baron noir, Years and Years, Three Girls, Happy Valley, Top of the Lake, The Split or Harlots add up. At the MIPCOM 2024, TVE announced the launch of international RTVE Play+ in Asia and Oceania (Japan, India, Hong Kong, South Korea, and Australia) for 22 October 2024.
