= Ana Caldas =

Spanish actress

Ana González de Caldas
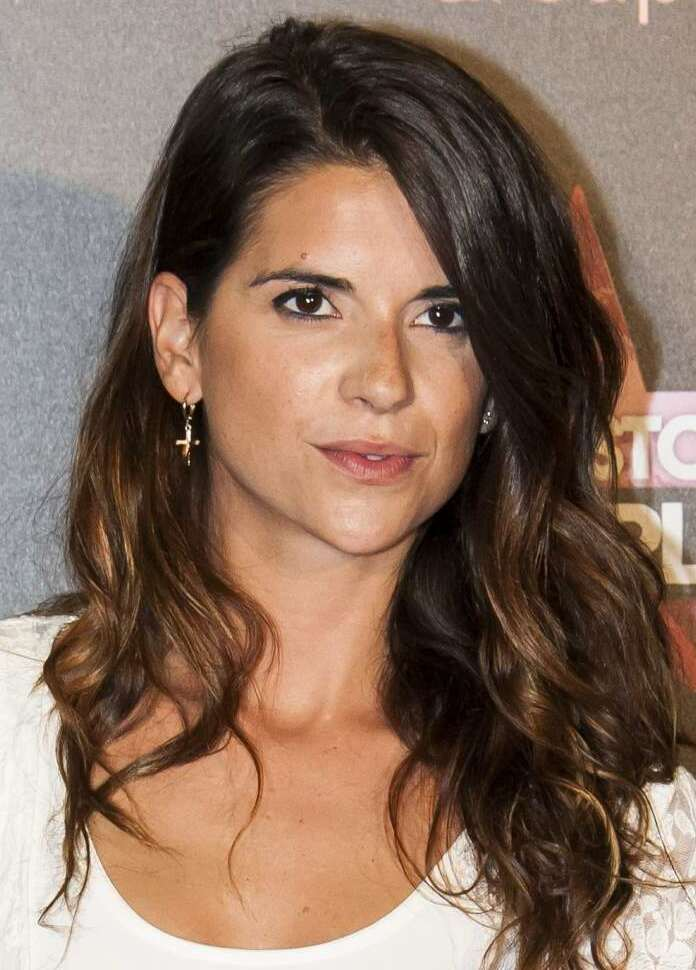
- Born: Ana González de Caldas Muñoz; Seville, Spain
- Occupation: actress
- Years active: 2007–present
- Parent: José María González de Caldas
- Website: www.anacaldas.es

Ana González de Caldas Muñoz, better known as Ana Caldas, (Seville, 1985) is a Spanish actress.

== Biography ==
She is the daughter of the former president of Sevilla FC, José María González de Caldas. From a young age, she was certain that acting was her calling.

== Career ==
She began her acting career in theater. Her first television role came in 2007 with the series El porvenir es largo (TVE). This was followed by other roles in series such as Cazadores de hombres (Antena 3), Bicho malo (nunca muere) (Neox), La pecera de Eva (Telecinco), Homicidios (Telecinco), Las aventuras del Capitán Alatriste (Telecinco), and Sin identidad (Antena 3), among others. After portraying Carmina Ordóñez in the series Carmina, she made her film debut in 2013 with Afterparty. She has also appeared in music videos for artists such as Alex O'Dogherty and la Bizarreria, Pablo Alborán in Pasos de cero, and Ángel Capel in "Sin ti me muero".

In 2017, she starred in the miniseries Todos queríamos matar al presidente (Amazon Prime Video), for which she received the best actress award at the Ficticia festival and nominations for best leading performance at the Die Seriale, Bilbao Seriesland, and Rome Web Awards festivals.

== Filmography ==
=== Television ===
Year	Title	Role	Channel
2007	El porvenir es largo		TVE
2008	Cazadores de hombres		Antena 3
2009	Bicho malo (nunca muere)	Susi	Neox
2011	Homicidios		Telecinco
2012	Carmina	Carmina Ordóñez young	Telecinco
2012	SubUrbania	Andrea	
2013	Malviviendo		YouTube
2014	Sin vida propia		YouTube
2014	Sin identidad		Antena 3
2015	Las aventuras del Capitán Alatriste		Telecinco
2017	El acabose		La 1
2017	Todos queríamos matar al presidente	Rosana	Amazon Prime Video
2017	Dorien	Runner	
2017-2019	Centro médico	Dr. Rocío Jiménez	TVE
2018	La catedral del mar		Antena 3 Netflix

=== Film ===
Year	Title	Role	Director	Notes
2013	Afterparty	Alex	Miguel Larraya	
2018	It Will Be Our Secret		Ana Caldas	Short film

== Awards ==
- Best Supporting Actress at the Los Angeles Web Fest for Sin Vida Propia (2015)
- Best Actress in an Independent Series at the Ficticia Festival 2018 for Todos queríamos matar al presidente.
