= Danza Invisible =

Spanish musical group

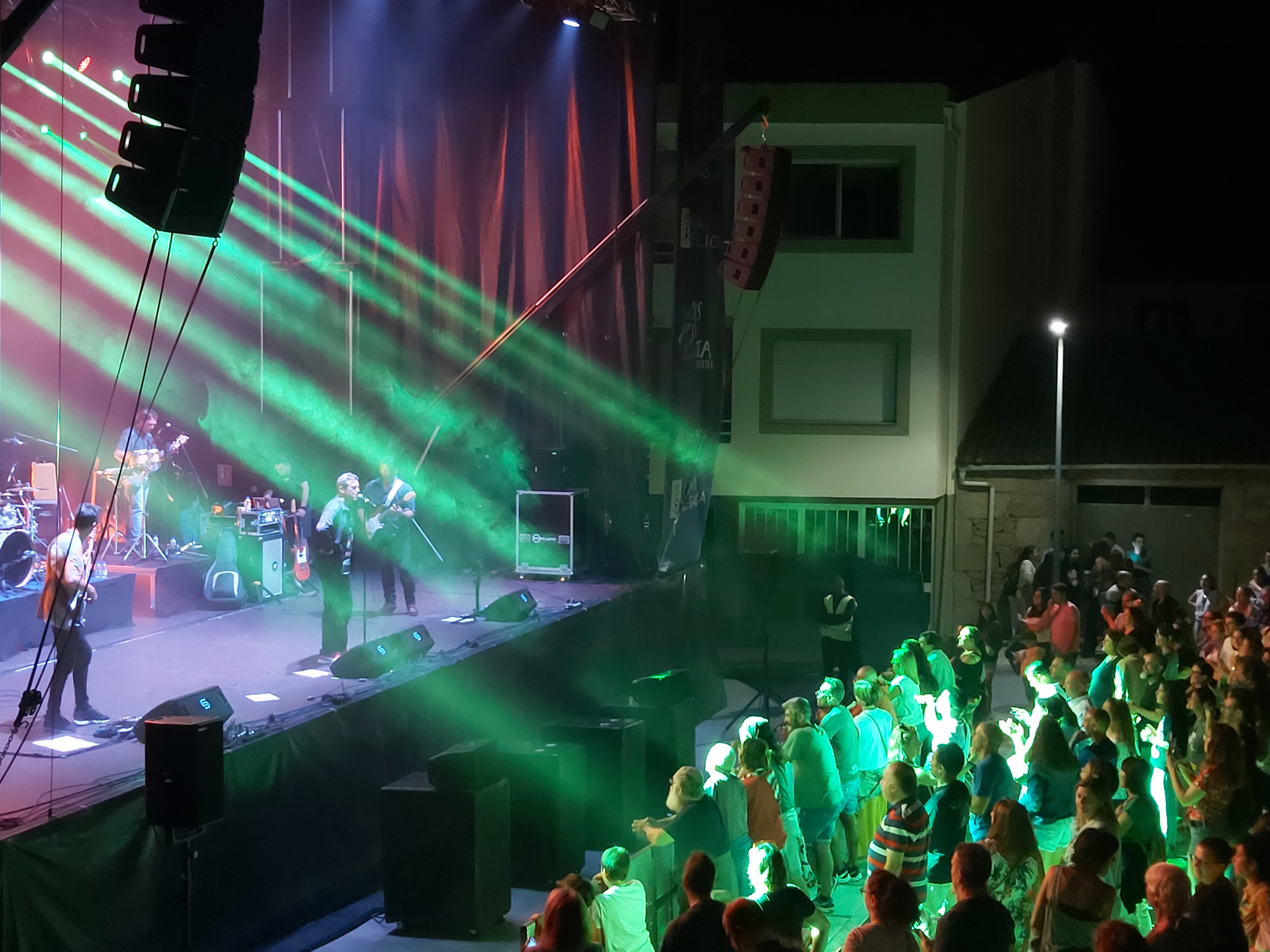
Danza Invisible in concert in Palais de Rei on 11 August 2022

Danza Invisible are a Spanish new wave band founded in 1981 in Torremolinos, Spain, by Ricardo Texidó from the group Cámara, together with Chris Navas and Manolo Rubio from the punk group Adrenalina. Shortly after, Antonio Gil joined the guitar section. The last to join the band was Javier Ojeda, who replaced Ricardo Texidó as lead vocalist.

They are one of the bands considered to have been part of the countercultural movement in Madrid in the 1980s. Their most popular songs include Sin aliento, Sabor de amor, A este lado de la carretera, and Agua sin Sueño. In 2022 they went on a sold-out tour finishing in Palais de Rei.

== Members ==
- Javier Ojeda (lead vocals)
- Chris Navas (bass)
- Manolo Rubio (guitar and vocals)
- Antonio L. Gil (guitar and keyboard)
- Nando Hidalgo (guitar and vocals)
- Miguelo Batún (drums)
- Ricardo Texidó (drums vocals)

== Discography ==
=== Albums ===
- Sueños (1982)
- Contacto interior (1983)
- Lo mejor de Danza Invisible (1983)
- Al amanecer (1983)
- Maratón (1985)
- Música de contrabando (1986)
- Directo (1987)
- A tu alcance (1988)
- 1984-1989 (1989)
- Catalina (1990)
- Bazar (1991)
- Clima raro (1993)
- Al compás de la banda (1995)
- Por ahora (1996)
- En equilibrio (1998)
- Grandes éxitos (2000)
- Effectos personales (2001)
- Pura danza (2003)
- Tía Lucía (2010)
- Treinta Tacos (2012)
- Danza Total (2013)

Singles:

- Tinieblas En Negro (1982)
- Tiempo De Amor (1983)
- Al Amanecer (1983)
- Danza Invisible (1983)
- El Ángel Caído (1985)
- Espuelas (1986)
- Sin aliento (1986)
- Ocio Y Negocio (1986)
- Agua Sin Sueño (1986)
- El Joven Nostálgico (1986)
- Hay Un Lugar (1987)
- El Fin Del Verano (1987)
- El Ángel Caído (1987)
- El Club Del Alcohol (1987)
- Reina del Caribe (1988)
- Sabor de amor (1988)
- A este lado de la carretera (1988)
- El brillo de una canción (1989)
- No Habrá Más Fiestas Para Mañana (1989)
- Catalina (1990)
- Soy Como Dos (1990, con Los Secretos)
- Naturaleza muerta (1990, con Los Raperos Del Sur)
- En celo (1990)
- Yolanda (1991)
- Diez Razones Para Vivir (1991)
- La Deuda De La Mentira (1991)
- Bodegón (1991)
- Fiesta Después De La Fiesta (1992)
- Solo El Amor Te Hará Llorar (1992)
- El Orden Del Mundo (1993)
- Amor De Madre (1993)
- Salsa Rosa (1993)
- La Estanquera Del Puerto (1994)
- Extraños De Madrugada (1996)
- A Sudar (1996)
- Por Ahí Se Va (1998)
- Junto A Ti (1998)
- Libro Abierto (1998)
- ¿Cuánto, Cuánto? (2001)
- Pero Ahora... (2001)
