= Years and Years (TV series) =

2019 British television series

- BBC promotional image
- Genre: Drama; Dystopian fiction; Political thriller; Science fiction; Black comedy
- Created by: Russell T Davies
- Written by: Russell T Davies
- Directed by: Simon Cellan Jones; Lisa Mulcahy
- Starring: Russell Tovey; Rory Kinnear; T'Nia Miller; Ruth Madeley; Anne Reid; Jessica Hynes; Emma Thompson
- Music by: Murray Gold
- Countries of origin: United Kingdom; United States
- Original language: English
- No. of episodes: 6

Production
- Executive producers: Simon Cellan Jones; Michaela Fereday; Lucy Richer; Russell T Davies; Nicola Shindler
- Producer: Karen Lewis
- Production location: Manchester
- Running time: 57–60 minutes
- Production company: Red Production Company

Original release
- Network: BBC One (UK); HBO (US)
- Release: 14 May – 18 June 2019

Years and Years is a dystopian science fiction drama television miniseries written by Russell T Davies. Taking place between 2019 and 2034, the six-part series follows the lives of the Lyons family, who witness increasingly tumultuous global affairs and the rise to power of Vivienne Rook, an outspoken British celebrity businesswoman turned populist politician whose controversial opinions divide the nation.

The series was a co-production between the BBC and HBO, and it premiered on BBC One on 14 May 2019 and on HBO on 24 June 2019. Years and Years stars Emma Thompson as Rook, alongside Russell Tovey, Rory Kinnear, T'Nia Miller, Ruth Madeley, Anne Reid, and Jessica Hynes as the Lyons family.

The series was directed by Simon Cellan Jones (episodes 1–4) and Lisa Mulcahy (episodes 5–6), with Davies, Cellan Jones, Michaela Fereday, Lucy Richer, and Nicola Shindler serving as executive producers. It received praise for its writing, characterisation, and exploration of modern political anxieties in a dystopian future. The show received three nominations at the 10th Critics' Choice Television Awards, in the categories of Best Limited Series, Best Supporting Actor in a Movie/Miniseries (for Tovey), and Best Supporting Actress in a Movie/Miniseries (for Thompson).

== Synopsis ==
The six-part series follows the Manchester-based Lyons family: housing officer Daniel is married to Ralph, married couple Stephen and Celeste worry about their two children, single mother Rosie is looking for a new partner, and sister Edith is engaged in one humanitarian cause after another. Presiding over them all is their grandmother, the imperious Muriel.

All their lives converge on one crucial night in 2019, and the story accelerates into the future, following the lives and loves of the Lyons over the next fifteen years as Britain is rocked by political upheavals, economic instability and technological advances.

== Cast and characters ==
=== Main ===
- The Lyons siblings:
  - Rory Kinnear as Stephen Lyons, the oldest Lyons sibling, a financial advisor who lives in London with his wife, Celeste, and their two daughters.
  - Jessica Hynes as Edith Lyons, a political activist
  - Russell Tovey as Daniel Lyons, a housing officer based in Manchester
  - Ruth Madeley as Rosie Lyons, the youngest of the Lyons siblings, who has spina bifida. She is a single mother, has two sons, Lee and Lincoln, and works in a school cafeteria.
- T'Nia Miller as Celeste Bisme-Lyons, an accountant and Stephen's wife
- Anne Reid as Muriel Deacon, the Lyons siblings' grandmother
- Emma Thompson as The Rt Hon Vivienne Rook MP, a charismatic and controversial businesswoman turned politician

=== Recurring ===
- Dino Fetscher as Ralph Cousins, Daniel's ex-husband, who is a primary school teacher.
- Maxim Baldry as Viktor Goraya, a Ukrainian refugee, who forms a romantic relationship with Daniel.
- Lydia West as Bethany Bisme-Lyons, Stephen and Celeste's older daughter, who identifies as transhuman, wishing to turn herself into data.
- Jade Alleyne as Ruby Bisme-Lyons, Stephen and Celeste's younger daughter
- Sharon Duncan-Brewster as Fran Baxter, a storyteller and activist who is Daniel's friend. She later becomes Edith's partner.

== Production ==
In June 2018, the BBC announced that Russell T Davies would write Years and Years, which was described as "an epic drama following a family over 15 years of unstable political, economical and technological advances". Davies noted that he had been aiming to write the drama series for almost two decades.

In October 2018, Emma Thompson joined the cast as Vivienne Rook (who shares a name with another of Davies' characters, a journalist in the Doctor Who episode "The Sound of Drums"), alongside Rory Kinnear, T'Nia Miller, Russell Tovey, Jessica Hynes, Lydia West, Ruth Madeley, and Anne Reid. Years and Years was cast by Andy Pryor. It was also announced that the series would be directed by Simon Cellan Jones.

Filming began in Manchester on 22 October 2018 and was completed on 17 March 2019. Locations included Trafford Park for the refugee camp and Altcar Training Camp, Liverpool for the "Erstwhile" site.

In order to cement the idea that the series was looking forward from the present day, the first episode was edited on the day it aired to include a radio news broadcast referencing the death of Doris Day, which had occurred the day prior.

== Episodes ==
No.	Episode	Directed by	Written by	Original release date	UK viewers (millions)
1	Episode 1	Simon Cellan Jones	Russell T Davies	14 May 2019	4.26
In 2019, businesswoman Vivienne "Viv" Rook (Emma Thompson) causes controversy by saying she "doesn't give a fuck" about the Israel-Palestine conflict on the political debate show Question Time. Meanwhile, Rosie Lyons gives birth to a son, Lincoln. Daniel Lyons, her brother, worries about the state of the world and what Lincoln's future will be. The timeline skips forwards to 2024. In the meantime, Donald Trump wins a second term as president, and China constructs an artificial island and a military base named Hong Sha Dao in disputed waters. Daniel marries Ralph, Queen Elizabeth dies, Viv tries and fails to be elected as an independent candidate in the 2022 general election. A Russian-backed military government takes over in Ukraine. Daniel manages a local council-run refugee camp, where he makes a connection with Viktor, who fled Ukraine after he was tortured for being gay. Teenage Bethany tells her parents, Stephen and Celeste, that she is transhuman, to her mother's horror and disapproval. Cracks begin to form in Daniel and Ralph's marriage, as Daniel's feelings for Viktor cause him to detach from his husband. Viv starts a political party, calling it The Four Star Party, the stars representing the asterisks that were used to censor her unapologetic use of the "F-bomb" on TV. Rosie goes on a date with Tony but leaves in disgust after she discovers he has sex with his house robot. At a party for grandmother Muriel Lyons' 92nd birthday, the family get a video call from long-absent Edith Lyons, who has travelled to Vietnam, close to Hong Sha Dao. As air raid sirens sound in the UK, news comes that Trump has fired a nuclear missile at Hong Sha Dao. In the ensuing uproar, Celeste tells Bethany that she can be whatever she wants to be, reversing her earlier opposition to Bethany's transhuman ambitions, and Daniel flees Ralph and his family for Viktor, and they have sex for the first time.
2	Episode 2	Simon Cellan Jones	Russell T Davies	21 May 2019	2.30
In 2025, Edith has survived the Hong Sha Dao nuclear strike but has been exposed to the nuclear fallout. She returns to live in the UK. Bethany, who has calculated radiation patterns from Hong Sha Dao, realises that Edith's life expectancy is ten years, but Edith chooses to keep this from the rest of the family. Celeste loses her job to artificial intelligence, and she and Stephen must sell their house in London. Bethany, who has turned eighteen, has cybernetic implants surgically installed in her hand, a step to becoming transhuman, and gets her first job as a data miner. Daniel is in the process of divorcing Ralph, and he and Viktor are living together as a couple. Though Ralph pretends to accept the split-up, he spitefully has Viktor deported to Ukraine by informing the Home Office of Viktor's job at a petrol station, illegal for an asylum seeker. Rosie and Edith attend an election debate in which Viv Rook unexpectedly electrifies the crowd. To Daniel's dismay, Rosie becomes a Rook supporter. Stephen and Celeste sell their house, leaving them with a little more than £1.2 million after settling the mortgage. The proceeds are deposited in a single bank account on the night of the sale. Overnight, their money is wiped out in a banking crisis triggered by the collapse of an American investment bank. With nowhere else to go, Stephen, Celeste, and their daughters move into Muriel's large but decaying house in Manchester. Viv Rook is elected MP in a Manchester by-election, as Rosie cheers her on.
3	Episode 3	Simon Cellan Jones	Russell T Davies	28 May 2019	1.29
In 2026, the banking crisis has led to a recession. Viv Rook proposes a national IQ test, with anybody with an IQ of less than 70 being barred from voting. In Ukraine, the police come to arrest Viktor, but he narrowly escapes. Ukraine has now criminalised homosexuality, so Viktor decides to illegally enter Spain and claim asylum. He escapes to Madrid, and Daniel visits him, planning to apply for Spanish citizenship and marry him. Edith returns to activism, infiltrating the offices of a corporation with links to the Syrian dictatorship. The information she steals is released, causing a scandal that shuts down the corporation. Bethany makes friends with Lizzie, another transhuman teen at her workplace. The availability of self-heating ready meals makes Rosie's job redundant. Stephen now works many low-paid jobs and begins an affair with co-worker Elaine. Celeste finds out, but does not confront him. The Lyons siblings' estranged father dies from antibiotic-resistant sepsis after being struck by a courier's bicycle. The siblings attend his water burial to support Stephen, who is the only one emotionally affected. There they meet with "Steven with a V", their father's son by his second wife. Rosie tells Edith she has always believed her father left the family because he could not deal with a child in a wheelchair. Bethany and Lizzie secretly travel to Liverpool for black-market cybernetic surgery, using £10,000 Stephen gave her for her eighteenth birthday. Bethany calls her mother in distress; Lizzie has been given a bogus, malfunctioning eye implant, but Bethany escapes unharmed. At first Celeste is glad Bethany is safe, but later she is furious that Bethany wasted money when the family is in financial crisis. A general election gives The Four Star Party fifteen seats in a hung parliament, allowing Viv Rook to determine the balance of power between a minority government and the opposition. Hearing the election results, Stephen uses his rental car to run over a fellow courier's bicycle in a fit of frustrated rage, while his siblings watch.
4	Episode 4	Simon Cellan Jones	Russell T Davies	4 June 2019	2.17
In 2027, voting is made universally mandatory, the coalition government collapses, and another general election is called. Countries become unstable: Greece leaves the EU, Italy's government resigns, Hungary declares bankruptcy, and the United States leaves the United Nations in response to extreme nationalism. Spain's government is overthrown by a far-left revolution and Viktor will soon be deported. Meanwhile, Stephen has a bad reaction to a paid drug experiment. He calls Elaine to pick him up, but the clinic accidentally calls Celeste too, and the three have an awkward meeting at his bedside. Arriving home, Celeste coldly confronts Stephen about the affair on a conference call with the whole family. Muriel angrily demands that he leave her house, and Stephen moves in with Elaine. Rosie begins a mobile catering business with her new boyfriend, Jonjo. Edith warns him that she is suspicious of his intentions towards Rosie's young sons and will be watchful. With Viktor soon to be repatriated to Ukraine, Daniel decides he has no choice but to illegally get him into the UK. Their trip is unsuccessful: they are unable to sneak across the border, and their money and passports are stolen while attempting to buy forged documents. Finally, they try sailing in an overcrowded boat from France. Half a mile off the British coast, the boat sinks. Daniel, along with most of the other passengers, drowns. Viktor survives and returns to Daniel's apartment in Manchester alone. The family rushes to the house, but Viktor will not answer the door. Viv Rook becomes the Prime Minister.
5	Episode 5	Lisa Mulcahy	Russell T Davies	11 June 2019	2.24
In 2028, Viv Rook promises freedom to her supporters but begins arresting her opponents. Catastrophic flooding and two dirty bombs result in huge numbers of displaced residents in the UK, prompting a new law that requires people with extra space in their homes to take in the victims. Edith works with relocation authorities and becomes suspicious that the poor are becoming "erstwhile", a new euphemism for being "disappeared", which she hears about from Viktor, who is in custody in the UK. Stephen visits Viktor to tell him that, unlike the rest of the family, he still blames him for Daniel's death. Checkpoints are erected around Rosie's neighbourhood in Manchester in response to criminal activity in the area, and she loses her license to operate her catering van. Bethany is fitted with a brain implant that enables her to interact directly with the internet, but also to spy on her family. Stephen is depressed that he could not pay for the surgery, leaving Bethany a virtual indentured worker to the government, which paid for it. Muriel is diagnosed with macular degeneration and uses the last of her savings to pay £10,000 for fast-track NHS surgery, which reverses the condition. Celeste gets along better with Muriel but bristles at being treated like an unpaid servant. Rosie and Jonjo become engaged, and Edith moves in with her new girlfriend. Stephen degrades himself to get a new high-paying job as a yes-man to Woody, an old acquaintance who calls him his "monkey". Bethany uses her vast new cyber powers to help Edith break into a facility that keeps records of the Erstwhiles and witnesses her aunt's near-collapse from radiation sickness. At a business auction held at Chequers, Stephen unexpectedly encounters Viv Rook, who reveals herself to be a slick fascistic monster (while she also makes a comment that hints at her being controlled by someone behind the curtains). Woody's company wins the contract to maintain two of the new "Erstwhile" concentration camps, intended as death camps. Stephen uses the company's computer system to send Viktor to the camp, which Bethany sees. At a memorial service to Daniel, Bethany alone knows that her father has betrayed Viktor and sent him to his likely death.
6	Episode 6	Lisa Mulcahy	Russell T Davies	18 June 2019	2.61
2029 begins in the midst of a monkey flu pandemic, and Bethany grudgingly tells Edith that her father sent Viktor to the death camp, fearful that she will be implicated in illegal activity and lose her implants. As attacks on journalists increase, the BBC shuts down. Muriel blames the family and humanity at large for the various problems in the world, saying that the cumulative effect of many small acts of indifference has created the toxic environment they now live in. Stephen breaks up with Elaine, buys an illegal gun, and puts it in his desk at work. Viktor wants to contact the family with a smuggled cell phone, but towers at the camp block all signals. By manipulating Stephen, Celeste gets a job at Woody's company to try to get information about the Erstwhile camps. Soon after, Rosie and her neighbours are outraged when her son and his friends are locked out of their apartment complex from an early lockdown due to an incident elsewhere. Meanwhile, Edith and her activist friends take steps to free Viktor and blow up the signal-blocking towers, causing the camp inmates to rush the gates, while armed guards threaten them. At the same time, Stephen confronts Celeste while she is helping Edith using the company's computers, revealing that he had intended to broadcast incriminating evidence against Viv Rook's death camps and then kill himself. Woody charges into the office, and Stephen shoots him in the leg. With the signals unblocked, Bethany and her friends at work broadcast footage from the camp to the whole country. Rosie breaks through the curfew fence around her estate with her catering van, to the cheers of her neighbours, and this act of civil disobedience is also broadcast nationally. With the camp liberated, Edith collapses to the ground. Later, Viv Rook is charged with murder relating to the Erstwhile sites, though it is unclear who financed and backed her, and the BBC is reopened. Stephen goes to jail for three years for shooting Woody but emerges with a new lease of life. Though Stephen and Celeste do not get back together, their family is again happy. Rosie and Jonjo get married and have a son together, named after Daniel. The timeline skips to 2034, where it is revealed that the events of the series were the retellings of Edith's memories, as she is in the process of uploading her mind to a new water molecule-based database, with Bethany watching from Muriel's home as a hologram. As Edith's body dies, she tells the technicians that she does not believe her consciousness can really be encoded, because the human spirit is more than just information. The series ends with the whole Lyons clan gathered around Muriel, unsure if Edith's consciousness was uploaded to the cloud.

== Broadcast ==
The series was broadcast on BBC One in the UK, BBC First in The Netherlands and Belgium, HBO in the US, Mexico, Latin America, Poland, and Spain, SBS in Australia, Soho in New Zealand, Canal+ in France, and ZDFneo in Germany.

In 2020, the series aired on M-Net in South Africa.

== Reception ==
=== Critical reception ===
On the review aggregator website Rotten Tomatoes, the series holds an approval rating of 89% based on 66 critics' reviews, with an average score of 7.30/10. The site's critical consensus reads, "Years and Years scathingly critiques the present with a nihilistic projection of the future, leavening the devastating satire with a buoyant sense of humour and characters who are easy to become invested in." On Metacritic, the series has a weighted average score of 78 out of 100, based on 24 critics, indicating "generally favorable reviews".

=== US ratings ===
No.	Title	Air date	Rating (A18–49)	US viewers
1	Episode 1	24 June 2019	0.05	193,000
2	Episode 2	1 July 2019	0.06	229,000
3	Episode 3	8 July 2019	0.03	171,000
4	Episode 4	15 July 2019	0.03	181,000
5	Episode 5	22 July 2019	0.04	189,000
6	Episode 6	29 July 2019	0.04	265,000

== Censorship in China ==
The series has been banned in China. Shortly after the premiere of the first episode, the show received an excellent rating of 9.5/10 on Douban, the largest movie review aggregator website in China, before being banned across Chinese search engines and social media. Relevant entries and posts, or even references to the name of the show, were filtered or promptly deleted from websites like Baidu and Weibo. Files with names containing "Years and Years" were taken down from the cloud storage service Baidu Wangpan. It is commonly believed that the censorship was due to the depiction of Xi Jinping and the military confrontation between China and America in the South China Sea, which are deemed sensitive topics in China.
