= Playz =

Online television service

playz
- Developer(s): RTVE
- Initial release: 30 October 2017; 7 years ago
- Type: Streaming television
- Website: www.rtve.es/playz/

Playz (stylised as playz) is an online service belonging to Radiotelevisión Española (RTVE), the Spanish public broadcaster, streaming free-to-air content for a young audience. It was launched on 30 October 2017.

== History ==
Embedded within the RTVE webpage, Playz was launched on 30 October 2017, with the release of Colegas, Mambo, Dorien and Inhibidos. The launch was predated by the premiere of another original release on 11 September 2017, Si fueras tú, a transmedia fiction series loosely adapting the New Zealand series Reservoir Hill which served to promote the kickstart of the platform.

== Programming ==
The platform aims towards a young audience, from 15 to 35 years, intending to draw the interest from that demographics, with decreasing viewership figures in traditional television. Content includes original webseries, interactive documentaries, fiction stories in a podcast format, interactive cooking shows, a music and sport-centered section and a debate on current issues.

Fiction

Title	Genre	Premiere	Seasons	Status
Si fueras tú	Thriller	11 September 2017	1 season, 7 episodes	Ended
Mambo	Musical comedy	30 October 2017	2 seasons, 12 episodes	Ended
Dorien	Horror	30 October 2017	1 season, 6 episodes	Ended
Colegas	Comedy drama	30 October 2017	1 season, 6 episodes	Ended
Inhibidos	Thriller	30 October 2017	1 season, 7 episodes	Ended
Neverfilms	Parody	31 January 2018	1 season, 20 episodes	Ended
El punto frío	Mystery horror	19 April 2018	1 season, 6 episodes	Ended
Cupido	Fantasy	16 May 2018	1 season, 6 episodes	Ended
Limbo	Mystery horror	26 June 2018	1 season, 8 episodes	Ended
Bajo la red	Thriller	12 September 2018	2 seasons, 14 episodes	Ended
Wake Up	Science fiction	8 November 2018	1 season, 6 episodes	Ended
Abducidos	Spin-off	12 December 2018	1 season, 6 episodes	Ended
Boca Norte	Drama	23 January 2019	1 season, 6 episodes	Ended
Antes de perder	Road movie	7 March 2019	1 season, 7 episodes	Ended
Drama	Comedy	4 February 2020	1 season, 6 episodes	Ended
Grasa	Comedy drama	12 May 2020	2 season, 12 episodes	
Riders	Comedy thriller	12 May 2021	1 season, 7 episodes	Ended
Upcoming
Yrreal	Action thriller	17 November 2021	TBD	Pending release
Ser o no ser	Drama	TBD	TBD	In production

== Awards and nominations ==
Year	Award	Category	Nominee(s)	Result	Ref.
2021	68th Ondas Awards	Best Entertainment Program	Content fom playz	Won	
